= Tomasz Gizbert-Studnicki =

Polish jurist (born 1948)

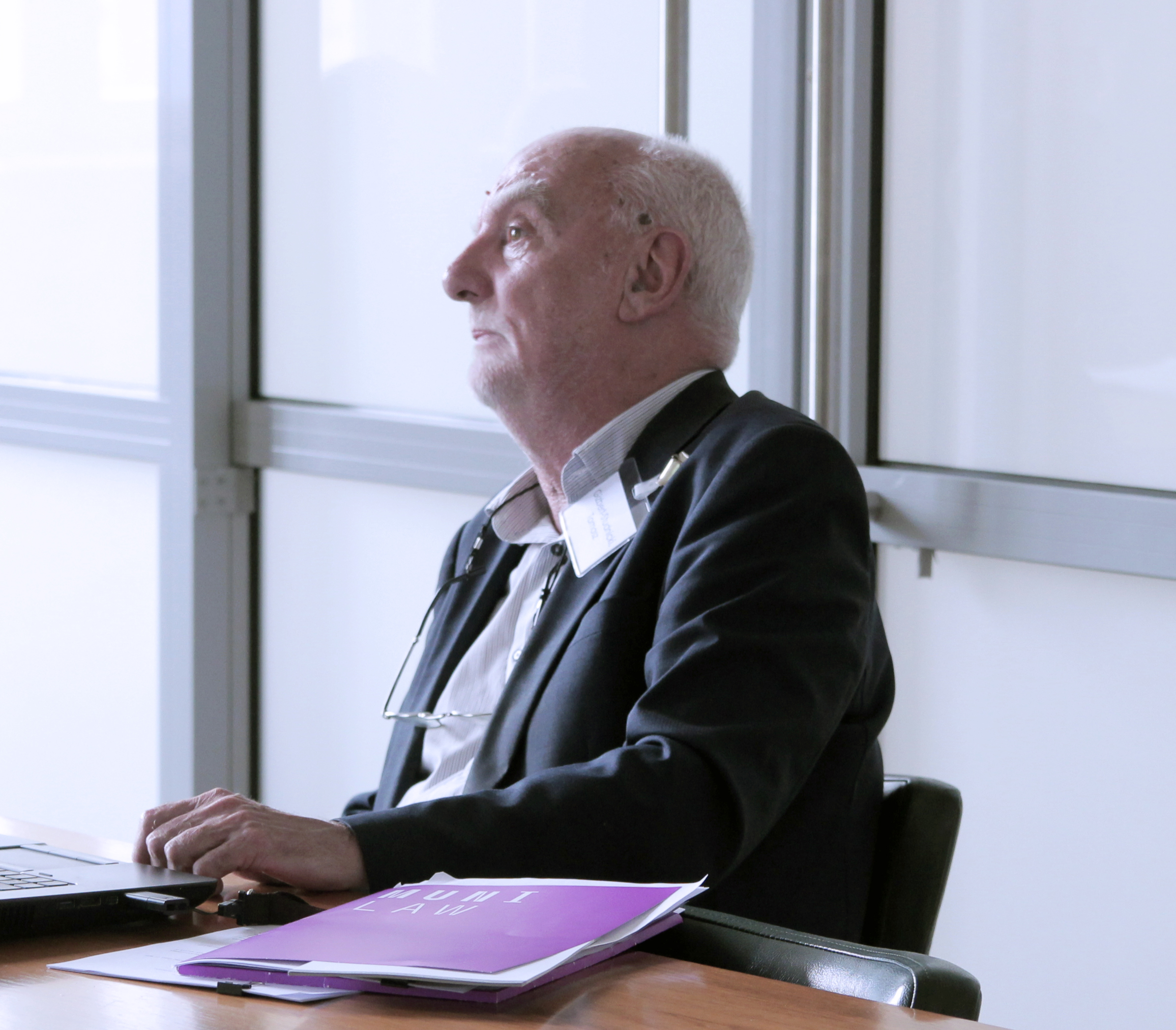
- Gizbert-Studnicki (2019)
- Born: 1948 (age 77–78)
- Citizenship: Polish
- Occupation: jurist

Academic background
- Education: Jagiellonian University, Faculty of Law
- Doctoral advisor: Kazimierz Opałek

Tomasz Gizbert-Studnicki (born 1948) is a Polish jurist and professor of legal sciences specializing in legal theory, Head of the Department of Legal Theory at the Faculty of Law and Administration of the Jagiellonian University, legal counsel, co-founder and senior partner in the SPCG law firm, who was also an activist of the democratic opposition in the Polish People's Republic. Chairman of the Jagiellonian Center for Law, Language and Philosophy.

== Biography ==
He was born as the son of a lawyer and professor of the Jagiellonian University, Franciszek Studnicki.

In 1970 he graduated from the Faculty of Law of the Jagiellonian University. There, in 1974, he obtained a doctoral degree upon a dissertation written under the supervision of Kazimierz Opałek. In 1989 he obtained the title of professor of legal sciences.

In 1978 he was a scholarship holder of Max Planck Gesellschaft in Hamburg, and in 1985−1987 he held a scholarship of Alexander von Humboldt Stiftung in Göttingen.

From 1988, he is the head of the Department of Legal Theory at the Faculty of Law and Administration of the Jagiellonian University.

In the 1980s Gizbert-Studnicki participated in the work of the Citizens' Center for Legislative Initiatives of Solidarity.

On 14 December 1981, the day after the martial law was introduced in Poland, Studnicki together with Krzysztof Płeszka and Tomasz Strzelczyk published a legal opinion in which they declared that the martial law had been introduced illegally. They signed themselves as "Lawyers from the Law Faculty of the Jagiellonian University", without specifying names. The three pointed out that, according to the then-Constitution of the Polish People's Republic, the Council of State could issue decrees only during intervals between the sessions of Sejm. In December 1981 the session of the Sejm lasted, therefore the Council of State did not have the right to issue a decree on the imposition of the martial law. Shortly after the publication, the opinion has been distributed by the Polish section of Radio Free Europe.

As a result of publishing an opinion about the martial law, Gizbert-Studnicki was "one of the people traced particularly in detail by the Security Service" in the 1980s .

He published a number of articles on analytical theory of law, including the theory of interpretation and legal argumentation, the theory of legal language and the analysis of legal concepts.

He is a member of the Legal Commission of the Polish Academy of Learning. In the years 1995−1999 he was a member of the executive committee of the International Association of Legal and Social Philosophy.

He was a promoter in ten completed doctoral programs (Adam Dyrda and Izabela Skoczeń were among his doctoral students). He was also a reviewer of several doctoral dissertations, a reviewer in several habilitation lectures and lines for the title of professor.

He is the curator of the Association of Law Students' Library of the Jagiellonian University (TBSP) and the supervisor of the Science Club of the Philosophy of Law of TBSP, and also a tutor at Collegium Invisibile.

In 1988, he founded a law firm, which ten years later has finally shaped into partnership T. Studnicki, K. Płeszka, Z. Ćwiąkalski and J. Górski (SPCG). Gizbert-Studnicki, as a counselor, specializes in company law and in transactions to acquire and merge companies, as well as in financing such transactions. He represented the SPCG's clients in several dozen transactions in this area, and as a Polish advisor he participated in several global M&A transactions. He is currently a senior partner at SPCG. The SPCG Law Firm and lawyers occupy high positions in rankings and are recommended in international industry lists, among others in: Chambers Global, Chambers Europe, Euromoney − Deal Watch, Forbes, Legal 500, PLC Which Lawyer, IFLR 100 and Best Lawyers, which evaluate the legal services market in Europe and in the world.

After the escalation of the 2015 Polish Constitutional Court crisis, Studnicki stated in a television interview that in his opinion Lech Morawski (one of the judges elected on the initiative and the votes of the deputies of Law and Justice party) "is a doubter, and his appointment to the Constitutional Court was not valid".

== Awards ==
In the ranking of law firms of the Rzeczpospolita daily published in 2010, the law firm partnership T. Studnicki, K. Płeszka, Z. Ćwiąkalski and J. Górski was ranked ninth in Poland.

In 2018, Gizbert-Studnicki was among thirty-nine lawyers and lawyers awarded the title of "Lawyer of the Thirty Years" by the Polish Union of Legal Employers and the Rzeczpospolita daily.
