= Wolter =

Wolter is a given name and surname of Low German and Low Franconian origin. It is equivalent to the English Walter, High German Walther, Dutch Wouter and French Gauthier. People with the name Wolter include:

== Given name ==
- Wolter von Plettenberg (c. 1450–1535), leader of the Teutonic knights
- Gerhard Wolter Molanus (1633–1722), Lutheran theologian and abbot
- Wolter Robert van Hoëvell (1812–1879), Dutch minister, politician, reformer, and writer
- Koenraad Wolter Swart (1916–1992), Dutch-American historian
- Robert Wolter Monginsidi (1925–1949), Indonesian independence fighter
- Wolter Robilotta (1945–2011), Brazilian footballer
- Wolter Wierbos (born 1957), Dutch jazz trombonist
- Wolter Kroes (born 1968), Dutch pop singer

== Surname ==
- Adolph Wolter (1903–1980), German-born American sculptor
- Aleksander Wolter (1905–1967), jurist and judge
- Bernard C. Wolter (1852–1936), American politician
- Birthe Wolter (born 1981), German actress
- Charlotte Wolter (1834–1897), German actress
- Franz-Erich Wolter, German computer scientist
- Hans Wolter (1911–1978), German physicist
- Harry Wolter (1884–1970), American baseball player
- Horst Wolter (born 1942), German footballer
- Karl Wolter (1894–1959), German footballer
- Kimberly-Rose Wolter, American actress, writer and producer
- Maurus Wolter (1825–1890), German abbot
- Michel Wolter (born 1962), Luxembourgian politician
- Mirko Wolter (born 1976), German speedway rider
- Philippe Wolter (1959–2005), Belgian actor
- Ralf Wolter (1926–2022), German actor
- Scott Wolter, American television personality and geologist
- Sherilyn Wolter (born 1951), American actress
- Thomas Wolter (born 1963), German footballer
- Waldemar Wolter (1908–1947), German concentration camp physician
- Whitey Wolter (1899–1947), American football player
- Władysław Wolter (1897–1986), Polish jurist
- Niels Wolter (born 1979), International Director of ESL, Global Esports Company
- Scott Wolter (born 1963), Engineering Professor, Elon University

== Others ==
- Wolter Monginsidi Airport in South East Sulawesi, Indonesia
- Wolter telescope, a telescope for X-rays named after Hans Wolter

== See also ==
- Walter (name)
- Wollter
- Wolters
