= Copernicus Festival =

Polish science festival

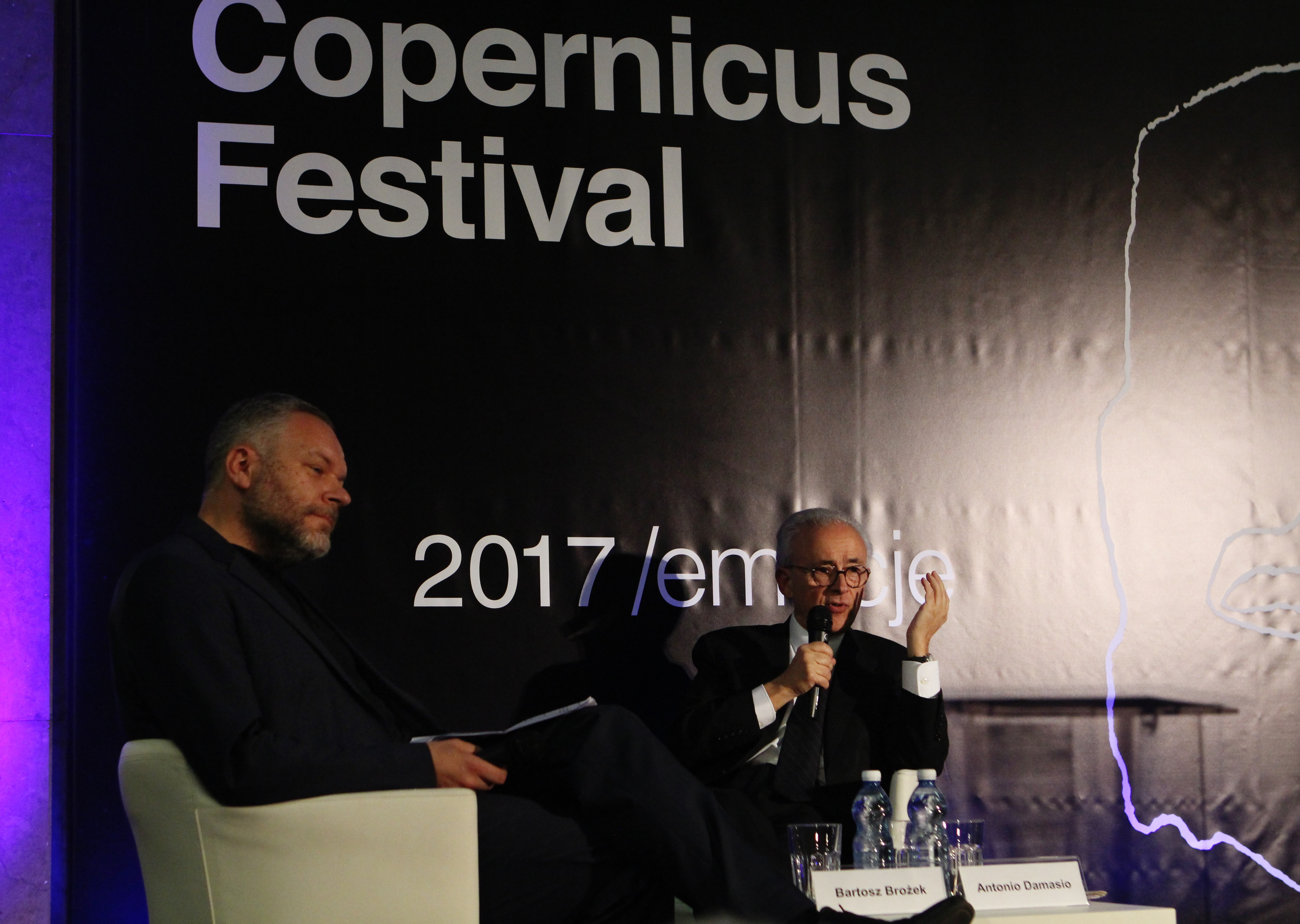
- Bartosz Brożek and Antonio Damasio at Copernicus Festival (2017)
- Genre: science festival
- Date: May
- Frequency: annually
- Location: Kraków
- Country: Poland
- Inaugurated: 2014
- Leader: Michał Heller
- Organizer: Copernicus Center for Interdisciplinary Studies, Tygodnik Powszechny Foundation
- Website: http://copernicusfestival.com/

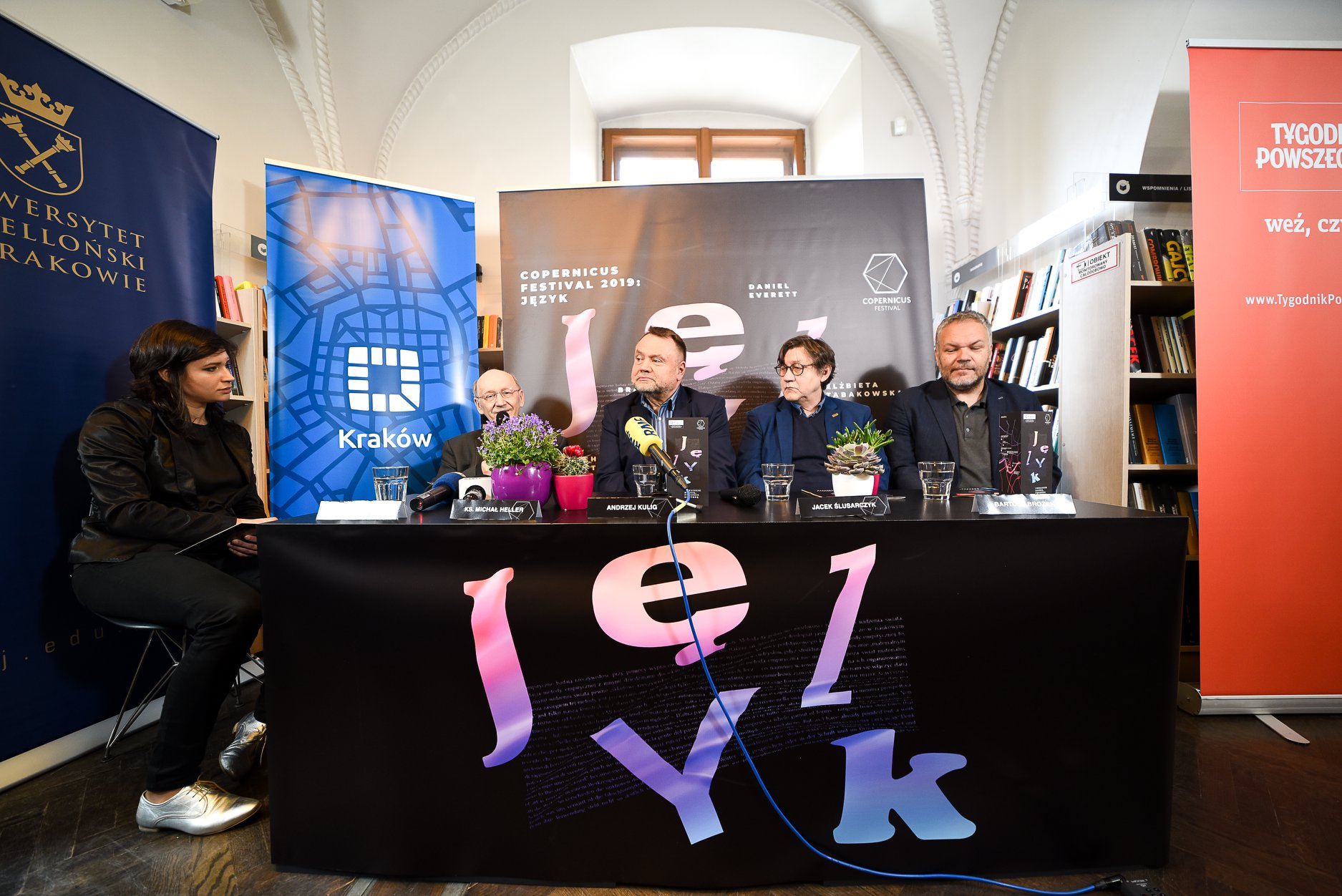
Press conference, 2019

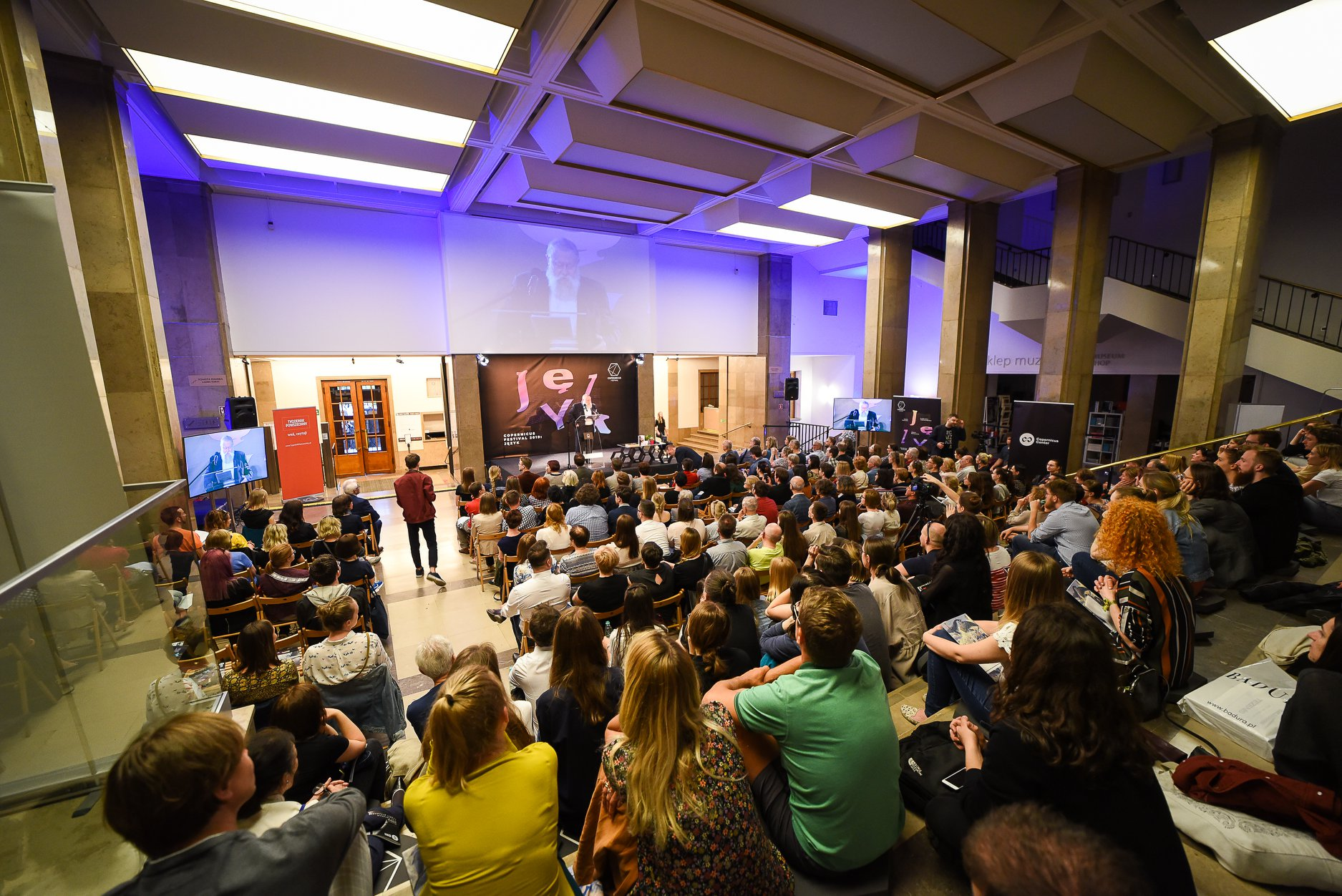
The lecture of Jerzy Bralczyk, 2019

Copernicus Festival is a science festival held every May in Kraków, Poland. It was founded in 2014 and provides lectures, discussions, workshops, film screenings and exhibitions focusing on neuroscience, evolutionary biology, physics, law, and philosophy at various venues in the city. The event is organized by the Copernicus Center and the Tygodnik Powszechny Foundation.

The majority of events are free of charge to promote accessibility.

== Idea and program ==
Copernicus Festival was created as a field of broad exchange of thoughts of representatives of various disciplines. "Science, art, humanities — each is trying to grasp and understand the phenomena that have a fundamental impact on our lives. (...) We decided to organize the festival so that important questions about the existence and limits of cognition could be raised together.", Grzegorz Jankowicz, one of the festival runners has written in the introduction to the catalog of the first edition of Copernicus Festival. It was held in May 2014 and the leitmotif of the edition was Revolutions.

Copernicus Festival main events, that is lectures and panel discussions, take place in the Main Building of the National Museum in Kraków. The lectures are translated simultaneously into Polish or English by Piotr Krasnowolski. The festival day usually starts with a morning program that includes the meetings of the Master's Breakfast series at De Revolutionibus Books & Cafe at Bracka Street. In the Basilica of the Holy Trinity, concerts accompanied by lectures take place in the evening. Additional points of the program are the concerts at Fourm Przestrzenie club and the nighttime film screenings in Kino Mikro. Among other festival locations there are Ludwik Solski Academy for the Dramatic Arts, Manggha Museum of Japanese Art and Technology and Kraków Philharmonic.

Each edition is accompanied by a free catalog published by Tygodnik Powszechny. The catalog contains the program and supplementary popular science articles. Copernicus Festival is managed with the support of financial resources of the City of Kraków, the Ministry of Culture and National Heritage of Poland, the Foundation for Polish Science and Krakowskie Biuro Festiwalowe.

== Editions ==
- 2014: Revolutions
- 2015: Genius (edition commemorated to Józef Hofmann)
- 2016: Beauty
- 2017: Emotions
- 2018: Chance
- 2019: Language
- 2020: Time
- 2021: Imagination
- 2022: Information
- 2023: Space
- 2025: Mystery
- 2026: Complexity

== Guests ==
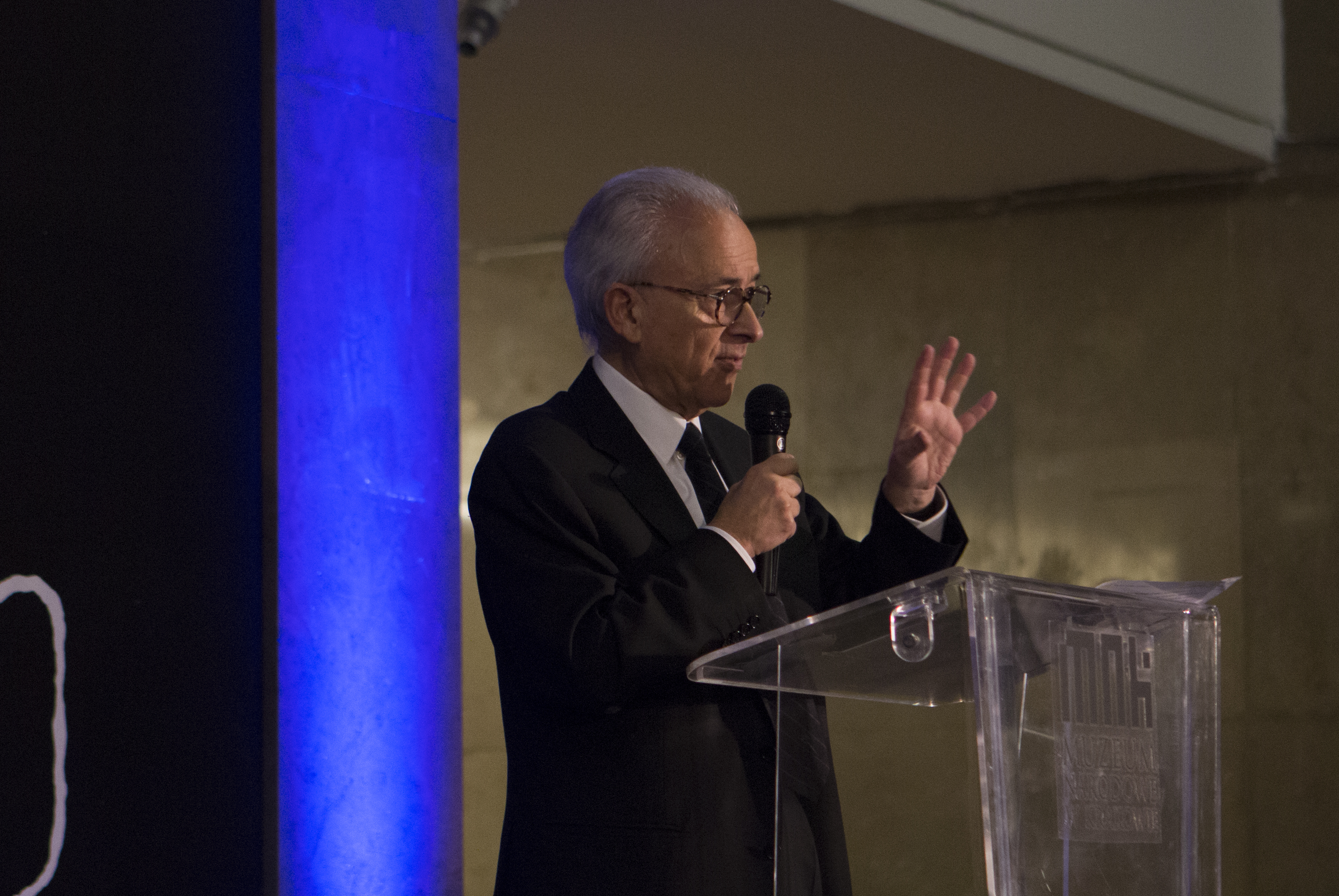
Lecture of Antonio Damasio at Copernicus Festival, 2017

Over the years the festival guests were, among others: Dominika Dudek, Adam Łomnicki, Łukasz Orbitowski, Jan Woleński, Krzysztof Zanussi (2014), Wojciech Bonowicz (since 2014), Jerzy Vetulani (2014–2016), George Ellis, Anna Wierzbicka, Katarzyna Chałasińska-Macukow, Andrzej Olechowski, Marek Krajewski, Fisz and Emade, Ewa Łętowska (2015), Julian Barbour, Semir Zeki, John Banville, Stefan Chwin, Marcin Rotkiewicz (2016), Hanna and Antonio Damasio, Karen Wynn, Paul Bloom, Mark Miodownik, Krzysztof Meissner, Andrzej Zoll, Andrzej Białas (2017), Robert H. Frank, Daniel Gilbert, Adam Zagajewski, Andrzej Jajszczyk (2018), Paul Davies, Charles Taylor, Daniel Everett (2019).

== Festival team ==
- Program director: Michał Heller
- Program board: Bartosz Brożek, Jerzy Stelmach, Jacek Ślusarczyk, Grzegorz Jankowicz
- Team coordinator: Bartłomiej Kucharzyk
