= Wolters =

Wolters is a Dutch and German patronymic surname equivalent to the English Walters. People with the surname Wolters include:

- Albert M. Wolters (born 1942), Dutch professor of Religion & Theology
- Carsten Wolters (born 1969), German footballer
- Clifton Wolters (1909–1991), English Anglican priest
- Daniella Wolters (born 1975), American actress
- Frans Wolters (1943–2005), Dutch politician
- Frederick Wolters (1904–1990), American field hockey player
- Friedrich Wolters (1876–1930), German historian, poet and translator
- Hans Edmund Wolters (1915–1991), German ornithologist
- Jannes Wolters (born 1979), Dutch footballer
- John Wolters (born 1940), American sprint canoeist
- John Wolters (1945–1997), American drummer
- Jürgen Wolters (1940–2015), German econometrician specializing in time series analysis
- Kara Wolters (born 1975), American basketball player
- Nate Wolters (born 1991), American basketball player
- O. W. Wolters (1915–2000), British historian
- Randy Wolters (born 1990), Dutch footballer
- Raymond Wolters (1938–2020), American historian
- Reinhard Wolters (born 1958), German historian
- Rudolf Wolters (1903–1983), German architect and government official
- Rynie Wolters (1842–1917), Dutch Major League Baseball player
- Tony Wolters (born 1992), American baseball player

== Named after people with the surname Wolters ==
- Fort Wolters, US military installation
- de:Hofbrauhaus Wolters, German brewery
- Wolters Kluwer, Dutch information services and publishing company

== See also ==
- Walters (surname)
- Wolter
- Wollter
- Wouters
