= Adam Dyrda =

Polish legal theorist (born 1987)

- Born: 1987 (age 38–39)
- Citizenship: Polish
- Education: Jagiellonian University, Faculty of Law
- Occupation: jurist

Adam Dyrda (born 1987) is a legal theorist, professor at the Department of Legal Theory at the Faculty of Law and Administration of the Jagiellonian University.

== Biography ==
In 2010 he graduated with master's degree in law from the Jagiellonian University. In 2012 he obtained doctorate upon the thesis Teza o konwencjonalizmie we współczesnym pozytywizmie prawniczym supervised by Tomasz Gizbert-Studnicki. In 2018 he obtained habilitation. In 2023 he obtained doctorate in philosophy.

His research interests include philosophy of law, pragmatism, social ontology and ethics of belief.

== Books ==
- Konwencja u podstaw prawa. Kontrowersje pozytywizmu prawniczego. Warszawa: Wolters Kluwer. 2013.
- Metodologiczne dychotomie: krytyka pozytywistycznych teorii prawa. Warszawa: Wolters Kluwer. 2016. With Andrzej Grabowski and Tomasz Gizbert-Studnicki.
- Spory teoretyczne w prawoznawstwie. Perspektywa holistycznego pragmatyzmu. Warszawa: Scholar. 2017.

=== Editions ===
- Ethics of institutional beliefs: from theoretical to empirical. Elgar Studies in Legal Theory. Cheltenham, Northampton: Edward Elgar Publishing. ISBN 978-1-0353-5384-2. Co-edited with Maciej Juzaszek, Biskup Bartosz and Wang Cuizhu.

== Accolades ==
- Nomination: Tadeusz Kotarbiński Award (2018)
