= Franciszek Studnicki =

Jurist (1914–1994)

- Born: 30 September 1914; Vienna
- Died: 29 March 1994 (aged 79); Kraków
- Citizenship: Polish
- Occupation: Jurist

Academic background
- Education: Jagiellonian University
- Doctoral advisor: Władysław Wolter

Franciszek Maria Tadeusz Gizbert-Studnicki (30 September 1914 – 29 March 1994) was a jurist, professor at the Jagiellonian University.

== Biography ==
He was the youngest child of Julian (1865–1946) and Zdzisława Paulina née Dembińska (1870–1952), nephew of Maria Giżbert-Studnicka and Witold Studnicki-Giżbert, brother of Juliusz Studnicki, Stanisław (1896–1956) and Tadeusz (1898–1979).

After graduating with matura from Kazimierz Morawski Gymnasium in Przemyśl in 1932, he studied at the Faculty of Law of the Jagiellonian University. In 1936, he earned a master's degree in law. From September 1937 to July 1938, he served in the military in Grudziądz. In 1939, he received doctorate from the Jagiellonian University based on his dissertation Przestępstwa przeciwko opiece i nadzorowi (Crimes Against Care and Supervision) written under the supervision of Władysław Wolter.

Also in 1939 he took part in the September Campaign. In 1943 he passed the bar examination. From 1952 he worked at the Department of Civil Law of the Jagiellonian University, headed by Stefan Grzybowski. In 1957 he received a Ford Foundation scholarship and conducted research at Stanford University, the University of California, the University of Chicago and Yale University. In 1968 he received the title of associate professor. From 1976 to 1991 he edited the annual Archivum Iuridicum Cracoviense. In the years 1979–1981 he was the director of the Institute of Computer Science at the Faculty of Mathematics and Physics of the Jagiellonian University.

He was a member of the Polish Philosophical Society. In 1981, he participated in the preparation of the new statute of the Jagiellonian University and the draft law on higher education. In June 1981 he was elected to the Social Legislative Council of Solidarity. He has translated several plays from English to Polish for radio and television. He authored humorous drawings. He was friends with Piotr Skrzynecki. He was married to Krystyna Zofia née Piotrowska (1917–1978 or 1999); their sons were Tomasz Gizbert-Studnicki and Paweł Gizbert-Studnicki.

Toward the end of his life, he lost his sight. He died in 1994 after an illness. He was buried at the Rakowicki Cemetery.

== Works ==
- Przepływ wiadomości o normach prawa. Kraków. 1965.
- Cybernetyka i prawo. Warszawa. 1969.
- Wstęp do informatyki prawniczej. Automatyczne systemy wyszukiwawcze. Poradnik zawodowy. Lublin. 1974.
- Wprowadzenie do informatyki prawniczej. Zautomatyzowane wyszukiwanie informacji prawniczej. Warszawa. 1978.
- Odesłania w tekstach prawnych. Ku metodom ich zautomatyzowanej interpretacji. Kraków. 1990. Co-authored with Andrzej Łachwa, Jarosław Fall and Ewa Stabrawa.

== Accolades ==
- Gold Cross of Merit (1971)
- Knight's Cross of the Order of Polonia Restituta
