= Izabela Skoczeń =

Polish legal theorist

- Citizenship: Polish
- Education: Jagiellonian University, Faculty of Law
- Occupation: jurist

Izabela Skoczeń is a legal theorist, academic teacher at the Jagiellonian University.

== Biography ==
In 2014 she graduated with a master's degree in law from the Jagiellonian University. In 2017 she obtained doctorate with distinction from the Jagiellonian University, upon her thesis Implicatures within the legal language supervised by Tomasz Gizbert-Studnicki. In 2024 she obtained habilitation.

Her research interests include experimental jurisprudence, cognitive sciences, philosophy of language and philosophy of law. She became a co-founder and collaborator of the Jagiellonian Research Centre for Law, Language, Philosophy.

== Books ==
- Implicatures within legal language. Springer Law and Philosophy Library. 2019.
