= Wollter =

Wollter is a surname. Notable people with the name include:

- Christopher Wollter (born 1972), Swedish actor
- Karl-Anders Wollter (1927–2017), Swedish diplomat
- Stina Wollter (born 1964), Swedish artist, television presenter and author
- Sven Wollter (1934–2020), Swedish actor

== See also ==
- Wolter
- Wolters
