= Association of Law Students' Library of the Jagiellonian University =

Association of Law Students’ Library of the Jagiellonian University (pol. Towarzystwo Biblioteki Słuchaczów Prawa Uniwersytetu Jagiellońskiego – TBSP UJ) is the oldest and one of the biggest student scientific associations in Poland.

== History ==
TBSP was established on 23 June 1851, the aim of the association was to organize and equip an independent law library for Polish law students at the Jagiellonian University, which was Germanised at that time as the Galician autonomy has not been introduced yet.

The activities of the association could be performed thanks to multiple donations made by professors and students. The book collection was growing systematically as well as TBSP's activities – as early as in 1890s scientific and oratorical competitions, congresses and lectures were organised. The association was actively participating in patriotic initiatives in Galicia.

During the years 1914–1915, when the Jagiellonian University was closed, TBSP moved to Vienna to continue its activities there and came back to Kraków after the re-opening of the university. During the Second World War, the association joined the underground education and made its library (i.e. the part which has not been requisitioned yet) fully available to students. In 1950, when Poland found itself in the Soviet zone of influence, the association was formally liquidated, its headquarters taken over by the university and its book collection – by the Jagiellonian Library; the scripts duplicating centre was suppressed. However TBSP's traditions were continued by informal circles of penal law students and historians of law. In 1957 TBSP was officially reactivated, efforts have been made to recover the book collection. Since that time, the association has not been an independent entity but a unit of the Jagiellonian University.

== Activities ==
At present, TBSP unites about 1500 students and runs various educational and cultural activities. In the framework of 23 sections, additional classes are organised for younger students to help them prepare for participating in faculty competitions and final examinations. More advanced students participate in discussions and specialist workshops organised in cooperation with partner institutions and law firms. The association runs intensive publishing activities, just to mention regular Scientific Books of the TBSP UJ or repetitive courses for students. Traditionally, respective sections organise study trips to the Constitutional Tribunal, the Supreme Court etc., to help students to get to know the most important Polish institutions. Each year various scientific congresses are organized, many of them of international dimension, while permanent evening meetings with the most prominent professors and law practitioners allow students to get some less formal contact with the legal profession.

== Notable ancient members ==
- Prof. Fryderyk Zoll (senior) (1834-1917) - vice-president of Academy of Learning, rector of Jagiellonian University
- Prof. Edmund Krzymuski (1852-1928) - member of Academy of Learning, vice-president of the Penal Law Codification Commission
- Prof. Władysław Wolter (1897-1986) - member of Academy of Learning and Polish Academy of Sciences
- Prof. Stanisław Grodziski - vice-president of Academy of Learning, member of PEN-Club and Société d'Histoire du Droit
- Prof. Andrzej Zoll - Polish Ombudsman, president of the Constitutional Tribunal, member of European Academy of Sciences and Arts
- Prof. Andrzej Mączyński - member of Academy of Learning and Polish Academy of Sciences, judge of Constitutional Tribunal, member of the Civil Law Codification Commission
