= Bartosz Brożek =

Polish philosopher and jurist (born 1977)

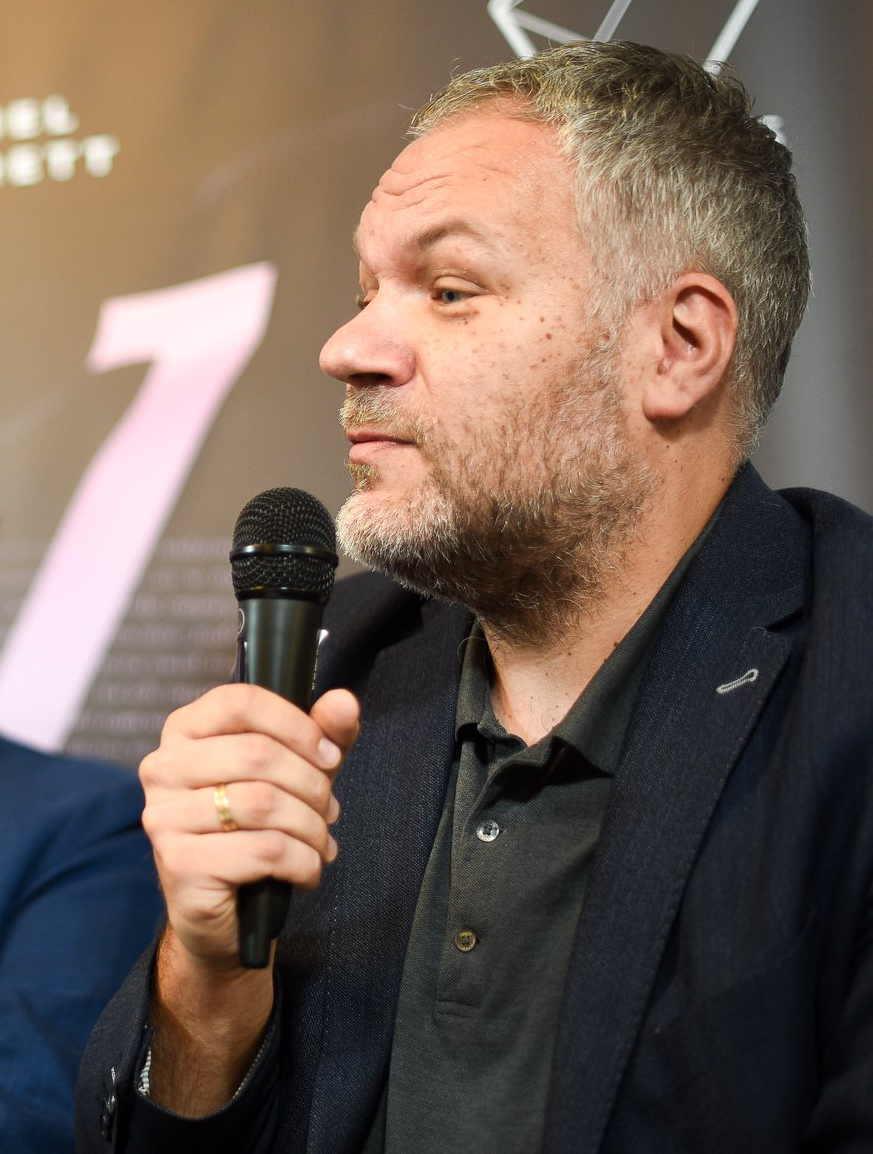
- Bartosz Brożek in 2019 at the Copernicus Festival
- Born: 17 June 1977 (age 49); Kraków, Poland

Education
- Education: Jagiellonian University (M.A., 2001, Ph.D., 2003)

Philosophical work
- Era: Contemporary philosophy
- Region: Western Philosophy
- Institutions: Jagiellonian University, Copernicus Center for Interdisciplinary Studies
- Main interests: Philosophy of law, Logic, Cognitive science, Neurolaw, Philosophy of mind, Philosophy of science

Bartosz Paweł Brożek (born 17 June 1977) is a Polish philosopher and jurist whose main research interests are in philosophy of law, philosophy of science, logic and cognitive science. He is currently professor of jurisprudence at the Jagiellonian University and vice rector of the Jagiellonian University, as well as a former director of the Copernicus Center for Interdisciplinary Studies in Kraków. Author or co-author of more than 20 book monographs (including Methods of Legal Reasoning from Springer, as well as The Legal Mind from Cambridge University Press) and more than 70 scientific papers. He holds PhDs in both law (2003) and philosophy (2007), habilitation in law (2008) and the title of full professor (2013).

Professor Brożek received numerous awards and prizes, including the Award of the Prime Minister of Poland for the Habilitation Dissertation, the Scholarship of the Minister of Science and Higher Education for Outstanding Young Scholars, as well as the fellowship of Alexander von Humboldt Foundation. He is also a laureate of the Foundation for Polish Science MASTER programme (2015). In 2013 he was the youngest person in Poland who held the title of professor.

== Main book publications ==
- J. Stelmach, B. Brożek, Metody prawnicze, Zakamycze, Kraków 2004.
- B. Brożek, Defeasibility of Legal Reasoning, Zakamycze, Kraków 2004.
- J. Stelmach, B. Brożek, Methods of Legal Reasoning, Springer Verlag, New York 2006.
- J. Stelmach, B. Brożek, W. Załuski, Dziesięć wykładów o ekonomii prawa, Wolters Kluwer Polska, Warszawa 2007.
- B. Brożek, Rationality and Discourse. Towards a Normative Model of Applying Law, Wolters Kluwer Polska, Warszawa 2007.
- J. Stelmach, B. Brożek, M. Soniewicka, W. Załuski, Paradoksy bioetyki prawniczej, Wolters Kluwer Polska, Warszawa 2010.
- J. Stelmach, B. Brożek, Sztuka negocjacji prawniczych, Wolters Kluwer Polska, Warszawa 2010.
- B. Brożek, The Double Truth Controversy. An Analytical Essay, Copernicus Center Press, Kraków 2010.
- B. Brożek, Normatywność prawa, Wolters Kluwer Polska, Warszawa 2012.
- B. Brożek, Rule-Following. From Imitation to the Normative Mind, Copernicus Center Press, Kraków 2012.
- J. Stelmach, B. Brożek, The Art of Legal Negotiations, Wolters Kluwer Polska, Warszawa 2012.
- B. Brożek, A. Brożek, J. Stelmach, Fenomen normatywności, Copernicus Center Press 2013.
- J. Stelmach, B. Brożek, Negocjacje, Copernicus Center Press, Kraków 2014.
- J. Stelmach, B. Brożek, Theorie der juristischen Verhandlungen, Nomos, Baden-Baden 2014.
- B. Brożek, Granice interpretacji, Copernicus Center Press, Kraków 2014.
- B. Brożek, M. Hohol, Umysł matematyczny, Copernicus Center Press, Kraków 2015.
- B. Brożek, Myślenie: podręcznik użytkownika, Copernicus Center Press, Kraków 2016.
- B. Brożek, The Legal Mind, Cambridge University Press, Cambridge 2019.
