= Krzysztof Płeszka =

Polish legal theorist (born 1953)

- Born: 1953 (age 72–73)
- Citizenship: Polish
- Education: Jagiellonian University, Faculty of Law
- Occupation: jurist

Krzysztof Płeszka (born 1953) is a legal theorist who was the head of the Department of Theory of Law at the Jagiellonian University in the years 2018–2023.

== Biography ==
In 1976 he graduated in law from the Jagiellonian University. In 1984 he obtained doctorate. From 1989 until 1991 he was an Alexander von Humboldt Foundation scholarship holder. In 1997 he obtained habilitation.

He supervised one doctoral dissertation. He was a co-founder of the SPCG law firm and was its managing partner until June 2023.

== Books ==
- Hierarchia w systemie prawa. Kraków. 1988.
- Uzasadnianie decyzji interpretacyjnych przez ich konsekwencje. Kraków. 1996.
- Wykładnia rozszerzająca. Warszawa. 2010.
