= Tomasz Placek =

Polish philosopher

- Occupation: Philosopher

Academic background
- Education: Jagiellonian University
- Doctoral advisor: Jan Woleński

Tomasz Placek is a philosopher, professor at the Jagiellonian University.

== Biography ==
In 1984 he graduated with a master's degree in physics from the Jagiellonian University. In 1991 he obtained doctorate in philosophy upon thesis Intersubiektywność matematyki intuicjonistycznej supervised by Jan Woleński. In 2001 he obtained habilitation. In 2012 he obtained the title of professor. His research interests include philosophy of mathematics, philosophy of physics and metaphysics. He authored several dozen research papers. He supervised two doctoral dissertations, including the doctoral dissertation of Leszek Wroński.

== Books ==
- Intuitionism and Intersubjectivity. An Exposition of Arguments for Mathematical Intuitionism. Dordrecht: Kluwer Academic Publishers. 1999.
- Is Nature Deterministic? A Branching Perspective on EPR Phenomena. Kraków: Jagiellonian University Press. 2000.

=== Editor ===
- The history and philosohy of Polish logic: essays in honour of Jan Woleński. History of Analytic Philosophy. New York: Palgrave Macmillan. 2014. ISBN 978-1-137-03090-0. Co-edited with Katarzyna Kijania-Placek and Kevin Mulligan.
