= Katarzyna Kijania-Placek =

Polish philosopher

- Born: 13 January 1968 (age 58)
- Occupation: Philosopher

Academic background
- Education: Jagiellonian University
- Doctoral advisor: Jan Woleński

Katarzyna Justyna Kijania-Placek (born 13 January 1968) is a philosopher specializing in philosophy of language, epistemology, philosophical logic and theory of truth, professor at the Jagiellonian University.

== Biography ==
In 1994 she graduated with a master's degree in philosophy from the Jagiellonian University. In 1999 she obtained doctorate upon dissertation Konsensualne kryterium prawdy. Analiza logiczna, written under the supervision of Jan Woleński. In 2013 she obtained habilitation, and in 2024 she obtained the title of professor. She supervised one doctoral dissertation.

She heads the Philosophy of Language and Mind Workshop (Pracownia Filozofii Języka i Umysłu) at the Institute of Philosophy of the Jagiellonian University. From 2016 to 2019 she was a member of the Committee of Philosophical Sciences of the Polish Academy of Sciences. From 2010 to 2011, she was a member of the ministerial Council of Young Scientists. From 2000 to 2002, she was a member of the board of the Polish Society for Logic and Philosophy of Science. From 2018 to 2024, she directed the interdisciplinary Jagiellonian Center for Law, Language and Philosophy; later she became member the center's board.

She published in journals such as Philosophical Studies, Journal of Semantics, Synthese and Erkenntnis. She is the author of the polysemous theory of proper names, which takes into account multiple types of systematic uses of proper names.

== Books ==
- Prawda i konsensus. Logiczne podstawy konsensualnego kryterium prawdy. Kraków: Wydawnictwo Uniwersytetu Jagiellońskiego. 2007. ISBN 83-233-1320-2.
- Pochwała okazjonalności. Analiza deskryptywnych użyć wyrażeń okazjonalnych. Wydawnictwo Naukowe Semper. 2012. ISBN 978-83-7507-109-2.

=== Editor ===
- The history and philosohy of Polish logic: essays in honour of Jan Woleński. History of Analytic Philosophy. New York: Palgrave Macmillan. 2014. ISBN 978-1-137-03090-0. Co-edited with Tomasz Placek and Kevin Mulligan.
