= Kazimierz Opałek =

Polish jurist (1918–1995)

- Born: 13 July 1918; Kraków
- Died: 11 November 1995 (aged 77); Kraków
- Occupation: Jurist

Academic background
- Education: Jagiellonian University

Kazimierz Tadeusz Opałek (13 July 1918 – 11 November 1995) was a jurist and philosopher of law, member of the Polish Academy of Sciences and the Polish Academy of Arts and Sciences, professor, head of the Department of Theory of State and Law at the Jagiellonian University from 1954 until 1988. He was dean of the Faculty of Law of the Jagiellonian University (1945–1956), editor-in-chief of Kwartalnik Historii Nauki i Techniki and Studia Nauk Politycznych.

== Biography ==
He was the only son of Tadeusz and Eugenia née Polaczek. From 1928 until 1936 he attended the Bartłomiej Nowodworski Gymnasium in Kraków. He passed matura in 1936. Also in 1936 he started studying law at the Jagiellonian University. From 1938, while still a student, he served as deputy assistant and librarian at the Historical and Legal Seminar of the Jagiellonian University under Rafał Taubenschlag. He graduated in 1944 within underground education. He obtained master's degree in law in 1945.

In 1946 he obtained doctorate upon dissertation Hieronim Stroynowski jako filozof prawa. His doctoral students included Jan Woleński and Tomasz Gizbert-Studnicki. He was a member of the Polish United Workers' Party. He was the dean of the Law Faculty of the Jagiellonian University from 1954 to 1956.

He was buried at the Rakowicki Cemetery.

== Works ==
- Nauka filozofii prawa i prawa karnego w Polsce. Polska Akademia Umiejętności. 1948. Co-authored with Władysław Wolter.
- Znaczenie i rozwój nauki polskiej w XVIII wieku. Warszawa. 1951.
- Nauka polskiego Oświecenia w walce o postęp. Warszawa. 1951.
- Hugona Kołłątaja poglądy na państwo i prawo. Warszawa. 1952.
- Prawo natury u polskich fizjokratów. Warszawa. 1953.
- Myśl Oświecenia w Krakowie. Kraków. 1955.
- Podstawowe prawa i obowiązki obywatelskie w świetle Konstytucji PRL. Warszawa. 1955.
- Prawo podmiotowe. Warszawa. 1957.
- System prawa socjalistycznego. Warszawa. 1958.
- Z zagadnień praworządności socjalistycznej. Warszawa. 1958.
- Problemy metodologiczne nauki prawa. Warszawa. 1962.
- Współczesna teoria i socjologia prawa w USA. Warszawa. 1963. Co-authored with Jerzy Wróblewski.
- Zagadnienia teorii prawa. Warszawa. 1969. Co-authored with Jerzy Wróblewski.
- Z teorii dyrektyw i norm. Warszawa. 1974.
- Überlegungen zu Hans Kelsens. Allgemeine Theorie der Normen. Wien. 1980.
- Zagadnienia teorii prawa i teorii polityki. Warszawa. 1983. Second edition: 1985.
- Theorie der Direktiven und der Normen. Wien – New York. 1986.
- Prawo. Metodologia, filozofia, teoria prawa. Warszawa. 1991. Co-authored with Jerzy Wróblewski.
- Studia z teorii i filozofii prawa. Kraków: Wydawnictwo Uniwersytetu Jagiellońskiego. 1997. ISBN 8323310246. Posthumously prepared by Ryszard Sarkowicz and Jerzy Stelmach.
- Selected Papers in Legal Philosophy. Dordrecht – Boston – London. 1998. Posthumously prepared by Jan Woleński.

== Accolades ==
- Medal of the 10th Anniversary of People's Poland (15 January 1955)
- Honorary degree of the University of Pécs
