= Adam Jerzy Olszewski =

Roman Catholic priest and logician (born 1958)

- Born: 1958 (age 67–68)
- Occupation: Logician
- Employer: John Paul II Pontifical University of Kraków

Academic background
- Doctoral advisor: Michał Heller

Adam Jerzy Olszewski (born 1958) is a Roman Catholic priest, logician, professor at the John Paul II Pontifical University of Kraków.

== Biography ==
He obtained doctorate in 1996 under the supervision of Michał Heller. In 2010 he obtained habilitation. He supervised three doctoral dissertations.

His research interests include Church's thesis, content logic, order logic, and solipsism. Since 2020, he has been developing a view called solideism, a version of absolute solipsism. He published in „Studies in Logic, Grammar and Rhetoric”, „Analecta Cracoviensia”, „Zagadnienia Filozoficzne w Nauce”, „Organon F”, „Logic and Logical Philosophy”.

== Books ==
- Teza Churcha. Kontekst historyczno-filozoficzny. Kraków. 2009.
