= Leszek Wroński =

Polish philosopher

- Occupation: Philosopher

Academic background
- Education: Jagiellonian University
- Doctoral advisor: Tomasz Placek

Leszek Wroński is a philosopher specializing in epistemology and singer, professor at the Jagiellonian University.

== Biography ==
In 2006 he graduated in philosophy from the Jagiellonian University. He obtained doctorate in 2010 upon dissertation Zasada wspólnej przyczyny. Wyjaśnianie przez ekranowanie supervised by Tomasz Placek. From 2011 he has been employed at the Jagiellonian Uniwersity. In 2019 he obtained habilitation. His research interests include formal epistemology, philosophy of science and logic, mainly applications of probability in philosophy.

He claimed to sing Baroque music in the Kantorei Sankt Barbara choir and Renaissance music as a member of Collegium Palestrinae.

=== Controversy regarding the participation of Rafał Ziemkiewicz in Kraków Book Fair ===
In the second half of 2016 Leszek Wroński protested against the participation of Rafał Ziemkiewicz in the Kraków Book Fair, claiming that Ziemkiewicz in several of his statements offended women. The internet petition that he authored was signed by more than three thousand people, also protest was held against Ziemkiewicz's participation in the event. Ziemkiewicz, in response, demanded the Jagiellonian University rector, Wojciech Nowak, to "admonish and punish Wroński in an exemplary manner". The rector wrote in a statement that he "fully understands his indignation regarding the content of the statements and actions of Dr. Leszek Wroński", adding that the Wroński's views "are not presented in classes". However, the rector's disciplinary disciplinary spokesman of the rector of the Jagiellonian University, Adam Górski, denied to initiate disciplinary proceedings against Wroński. Four letters written by workers of the Jagiellonian University were sent to the universitie's authoritites in solidarity with Leszek Wroński.

== Books ==
- Reichenbach's paradise: constructing the realm of probabilistic common "causes". DeGruyter Open. 2014.
- In good form: arguing for epistemic norms of credence. Kraków: Uniwersytet Jagielloński w Krakowie. 2018. ISBN 978-83-233-4457-5.

=== Editions ===
- Making it formally explicit: probability, causality and indeterminism. Springer. 2017. Co-edited with Gábor Hofer-Szabó.
