= Michał Heller =

Polish cosmologist, Catholic priest and philosopher (born 1936)

The Reverend Michał Heller
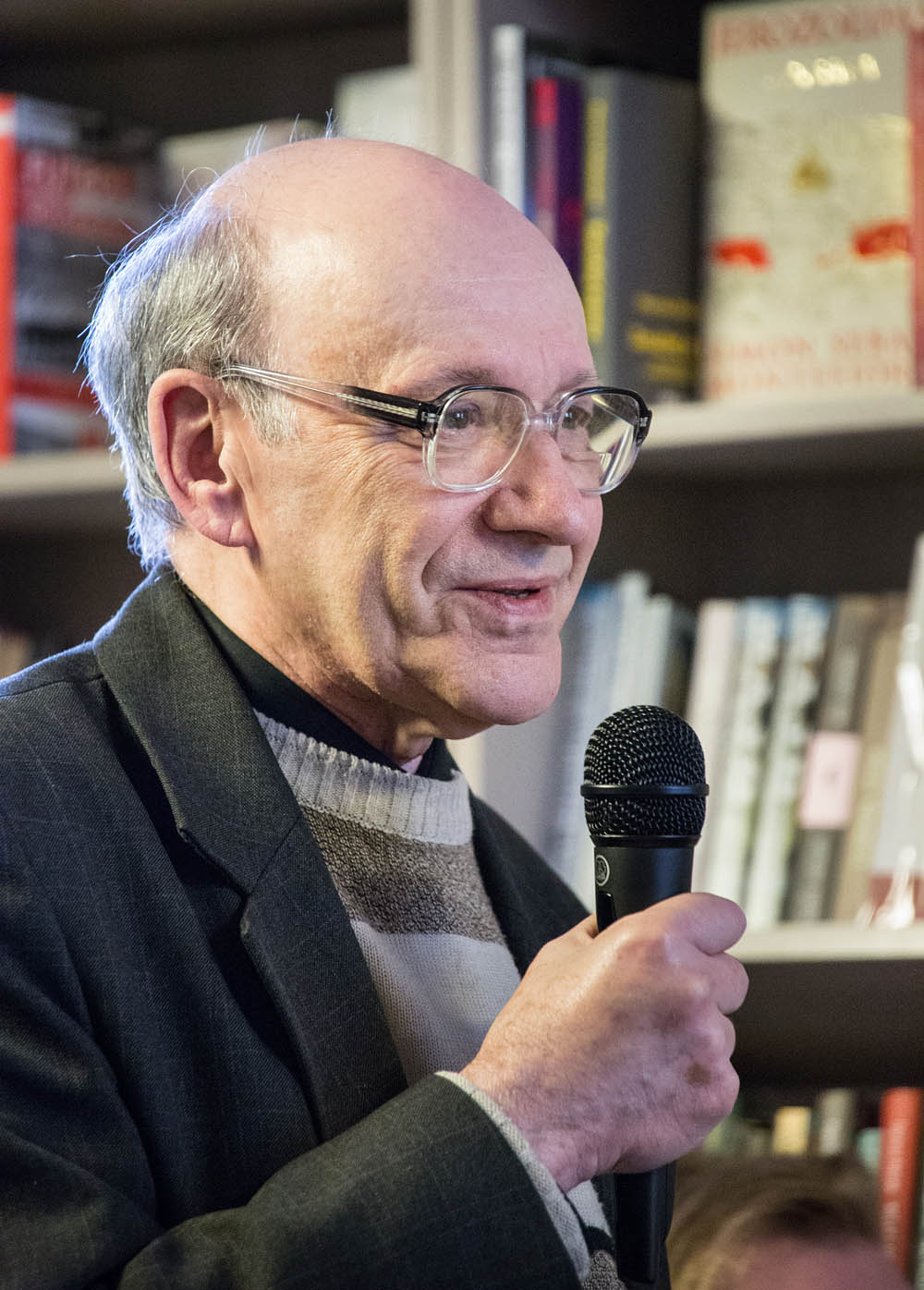
- Heller in 2016
- Born: 12 March 1936 (age 90); Tarnów, Poland
- Occupations: Philosopher, theoretical physicist
- Awards: Templeton Prize (2008); Order of Polonia Restituta (2009); Order of the White Eagle (2014)

Education
- Education: Catholic University of Lublin

Philosophical work
- Era: 20th-century philosophy 21st-century philosophy
- Region: Western philosophy: Polish philosophy
- School: Thomism
- Main interests: History of science; Philosophy of science; Theology; Theoretical physics; General relativity

Michał Kazimierz Heller (born 12 March 1936), also known as Michael Heller, is a Polish philosopher, theoretical physicist, cosmologist, theologian, and Catholic priest. He is a professor of philosophy at the Pontifical University of John Paul II in Kraków, Poland, and an adjunct member of the Vatican Observatory staff.

He also serves as a lecturer in the philosophy of science and logic at the Theological Institute in Tarnów. A Catholic priest belonging to the Diocese of Tarnów, Heller was ordained in 1959. In 2008, he received the Templeton Prize for his works in the field of philosophy.

== Career ==
Michał Heller attended high school in Mościce, graduated from the Catholic University of Lublin, where he earned a master's degree in philosophy in 1965 and a Ph.D. in cosmology in 1966.

After beginning his teaching career at Tarnów, he joined the faculty of the Pontifical Academy of Theology in 1972 and was appointed to a full professorship in 1985. He has been a visiting professor at the Catholic University of Louvain in Belgium and a visiting scientist at Belgium's University of Liège, the University of Oxford, the University of Leicester, Ruhr University in Germany, The Catholic University of America, and the University of Arizona among others.

His research is concerned with the singularity problem in general relativity and the use of noncommutative geometry in seeking the unification of general relativity and quantum mechanics into quantum gravity. Adam Jerzy Olszewski was among his doctoral students.

== Awards ==
=== Templeton Prize ===
In March 2008, Heller was awarded the $1.6 million (£820,000) Templeton Prize for his extensive philosophical and scientific probing of "big questions". His works have sought to reconcile the "known scientific world with the unknowable dimensions of God". On receiving the Templeton Prize, Heller said:

If we ask about the cause of the universe we should ask about the cause of mathematical laws. By doing so we are back in the great blueprint of God's thinking about the universe; the question on ultimate causality: why is there something rather than nothing?

When asking this question, we are not asking about a cause like all other causes. We are asking about the root of all possible causes.

Science is but a collective effort of the human mind to read the mind of God from question marks out of which we and the world around us seem to be made.

Heller used the prize money to establish the Copernicus Center for Interdisciplinary Studies – an institute named after Nicholas Copernicus aimed at research and popularisation of science and philosophy. He also serves as director of the annual Copernicus Festival held in Kraków.

=== Other distinctions ===
Honorary degrees from:

- AGH University of Science and Technology (1996)
- Cardinal Stefan Wyszyński University in Warsaw (2009)
- University of Life Sciences in Poznań (2010)
- Warsaw University of Technology (2012)
- Jagiellonian University (2012)
- University of Life Sciences in Lublin (2014)
- University of Silesia in Katowice (2015)
- Pontifical University of John Paul II (2016)
- Rzeszów University of Technology (2018)

Other distinctions:

- Cross of Merit (Poland) (2006)
- Order of Polonia Restituta (2009)
- Order of the White Eagle (Poland) (2014)

== Memberships ==
- Polish Academy of Learning
- Pontifical Academy of Sciences
- European Physical Society
- International Astronomical Union
- International Society on General Relativity and Gravitation
- International Society for the Study of Time
- International Society for Science and Religion

== See also ==
- List of Catholic clergy scientists
- List of Christians in science and technology
- Georges Lemaître, Belgian priest and cosmologist
