= Jan Woleński =

Polish philosopher (born 1940)

Jan Hertrich-Woleński
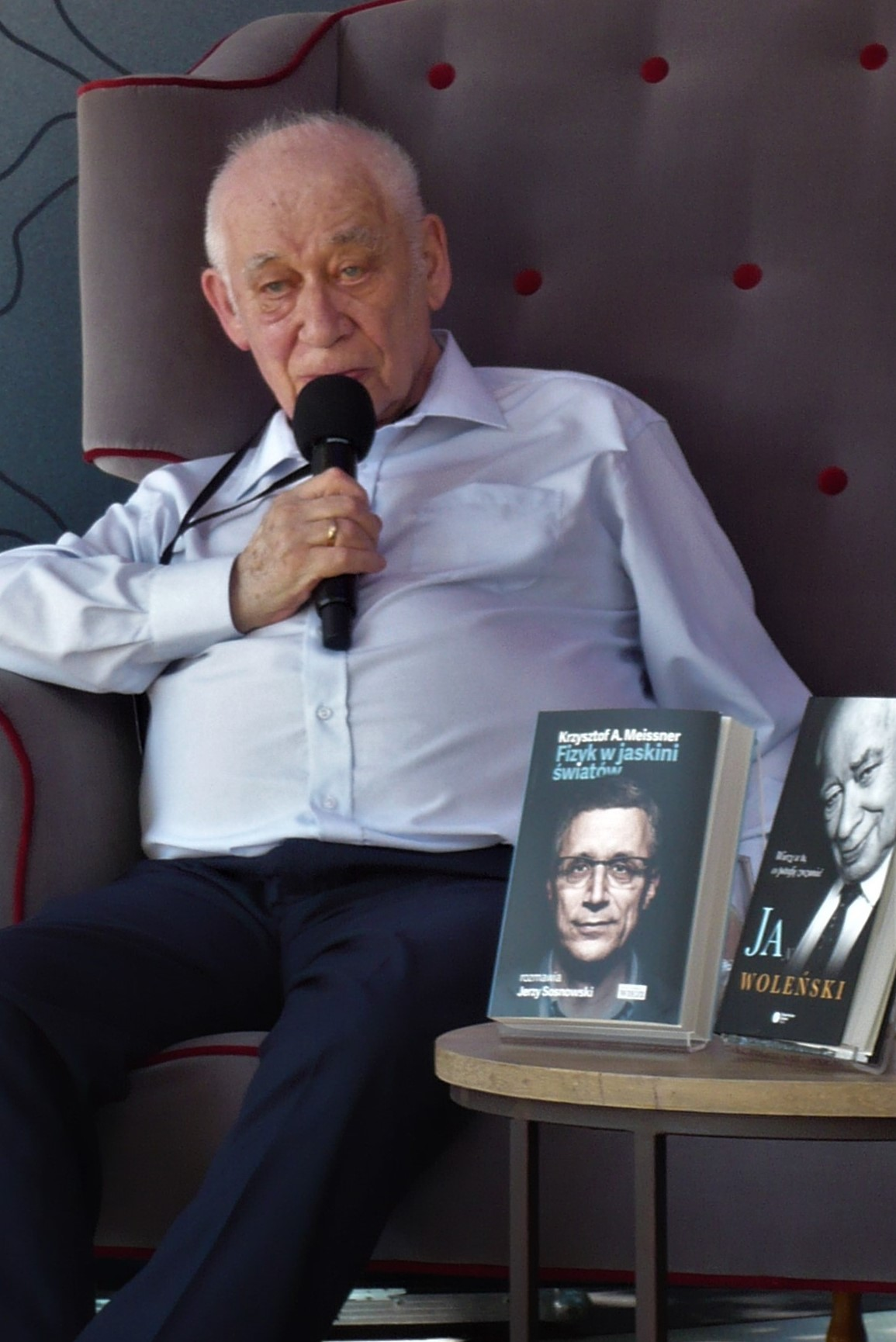
- Góry Literature Festival, 2023
- Born: 21 September 1940 (age 85); Radom, Poland
- Citizenship: Polish
- Education: Jagiellonian University
- Scientific career
- Fields: History of philosophy in Poland; Analytic philosophy Epistemology
- Doctoral advisor: Kazimierz Opałek

Jan Hertrich-Woleński (also known as Jan Woleński; born 21 September 1940) is a Polish philosopher specializing in the history of the Lwów–Warsaw school of logic and in analytic philosophy.

He has spent most of his academic career at the Jagiellonian University in Kraków, where he is currently Professor Emeritus. His main fields of research are logic, epistemology, and the history of philosophy in Poland. He was chosen a member of the Polish Academy of Sciences, Polish Academy of Arts and Sciences and Warsaw Scientific Society.

== Life ==
Jan Woleński was born in Radom, Poland on 21 September 1940. His first interest was law and he began studies at Jagiellonian University in 1958. Soon philosophy drew his attention and by 1963 he was employed in the Department of State and Law as an assistant professor. He looked to analytical jurisprudence in the United Kingdom, and with the guidance of Kazimierz Opałek, in 1968, he produced his thesis. Continuing his ascent, he produced a Habilitation in 1972: Problems in the Interpretations of Law. In 1974 he straddled two positions: the Institute of Social Sciences at the Academy of Mining and Metallurgy, and lecturer on philosophy of science at the Institute of Philosophy at Jagiellonian University.

Wrocław University of Science and Technology invited him to teach in their Institute of Social Sciences in 1979. As an opponent of the state socialism governing Poland, Woleński edited an underground bulletin Riposte. Though he was appointed director of the Institute, he was removed after four months for his resistance activities. The journal Studia Logica engaged him as editor from 1987 to 1993. It was in 1988 that he gained appointment to the Institute of Philosophy at his alma mater. He became professor ordinarius in 1990 and chair of the Department of Epistemology in 1994.

Other editing positions include Synthese from 1990, The Monist from 1993, Studies in Eastern European Thought from 1993, Axiomathes from 1992, and the Synthese Library of Kluwer Academic. Woleński was president of the Polish Society of Logic and Philosophy of Science (1999 to 2002). "Jan Woleński has achieved success as a teacher and advisor, encompassing the supervision of fourteen doctoral dissertations. Among his graduates are professors of philosophy as well as of law." His doctoral students include Tomasz Placek, Katarzyna Kijania-Placek, Adam Chmielewski, Dariusz Łukasiewicz, Tomasz Kubalica and Andrzej Dąbrowski (philosopher).

He is on the consulting board of the philosophy journal, Theoria.

Institute Vienna Circle held a conference in 1997 on the Austro-Polish connections in logical empiricism. Woleński described the semantic theory of truth in his introductory essay, "Semantic Revolution – Rudolf Carnap, Kurt Gödel, Alfred Tarski". It was followed by a score of contributions from philosophers. Working with Eckehart Köhler, Wolenski edited the papers and the collection was published as Alfred Tarski and the Vienna Circle.

In November 2004 he received Kraków Book of the Month Award for the book Granice niewiary. In 2013 Woleński was awarded the Prize of the Foundation for Polish Science for a comprehensive analysis of the work of the Lwów-Warsaw school and for placing its achievements within the context of international discourse in contemporary philosophy.

Woleński was a plenary speaker at the second world congress on religion and logic held in Warsaw, June 18 to 22, 2017. He has continued academic involvement at the University of Information Technology and Management in Rzeszów Poland.

=== Personal ===
Woleński is active in Poland's atheist movement. In the 1960s he was a member of the government-sponsored Association of Atheists and Freethinkers, and since 2007 he is a member of the Honorary Committee of the Polish Rationalist Association. He is widely recognized in Poland as an atheist and has promoted the replacement of religion classes with philosophy classes in Polish schools.

Woleński is involved in the secular Jewish movement, writing on the common Polish-Jewish past and on today's Polish-Jewish relations. He is a member of B'nai B'rith and was deputy president of its Polish chapter from 2007 to 2012.

He was a member of the Polish United Workers' Party (the Polish communist party) from 1965 to 1981. From 1980 to 1990 he was a member of the Solidarity (Polish trade union) movement.

== Works ==
=== In English and French ===
- Woleński, Jan (1989). Logic and Philosophy in the Lvov-Warsaw School. Dordrecht Boston: Kluwer Academic Publishers. ISBN 9789027727497.
- Woleński, Jan (1990). Kotarbinski: Logic, Semantics and Ontology. Dordrecht Boston: Kluwer Academic Publishers.
- Woleński, Jan (1994). Philosophical Logic in Poland. Dordrecht Boston: Kluwer Academic Publishers.
- Woleński, Jan; Köhler, Eckehart (1999). Alfred Tarski and the Vienna circle: Austro-Polish Connections in Logical Empiricism. Dordrecht Boston: Kluwer Academic Publishers.
- Woleński, Jan (1999). Essays in the History of Logic and Logical Philosophy. Cracov: Jagiellonian University Press.
- Woleński, Jan; Niiniluoto, Ilkka; Sintonen, Matti (2004). Handbook of Epistemology. Dordrecht Boston: Kluwer Academic Publishers. ISBN 9781402019852.
- Woleński, Jan, Essays on Logic and Its Applications in Philosophy, Peter Lang, Frankfurt am Main 2011;
- Woleński, Jan, L’école de Lvov-Varsovie : Philosophie et logique en Pologne (1895-1939), Vrin, Paris 2011;
- Woleński, Jan, Historico-Philosophical Essays, v. 1, Copernicus Center Press, Kraków 2013;
- Woleński, Jan, Logic and Its Philosophy, Peter Lang, Berlin 2018;
- Woleński, Jan, Semantics and Truth, Springer Nature, Heidelberg 2019;
- Woleński, Jan (2024). Philosophical excursions into Jewish problems. Cracow: Austeria Editors. ISBN 9788378667568.

=== In Polish ===
- Woleński, Jan (1980). Z zagadnień analitycznej filozofii prawa, Quaestiones ad philosophiam analyticam iuris pertinentes, Warsaw, PWN.
- Woleński, Jan (1985). Filozoficzna szkoła lwowsko-warszawska, Warsaw, PWN.
- Woleński, Jan (1990). Kotarbiński, Wiedza Powszechna, Warsaw.
- Woleński, Jan (1993). Metamatematyka a epistemologia, Warsaw, PWN.
- Woleński, Jan (1996). W stronę logiki, Aureus, Cracow.
- Woleński, Jan (1997). Szkoła Lwowsko-Warszawska w polemikach, Warsaw, Scholar.
- Woleński, Jan (1999). Okolice filozofii prawa, Cracow, Universitas.
- Woleński, Jan (2000). Epistemologia, 3 volumes, Cracow, Aureus (reedited in one volume in 2005 by WN PWN, Warsaw).
- Woleński, Jan (2004). Granice niewiary, Cracow, Wydawnictwo Literackie.

== See also ==
- History of philosophy in Poland
- List of Poles
