= Aleksander Wolter =

Polish jurist and judge (1905–1967)

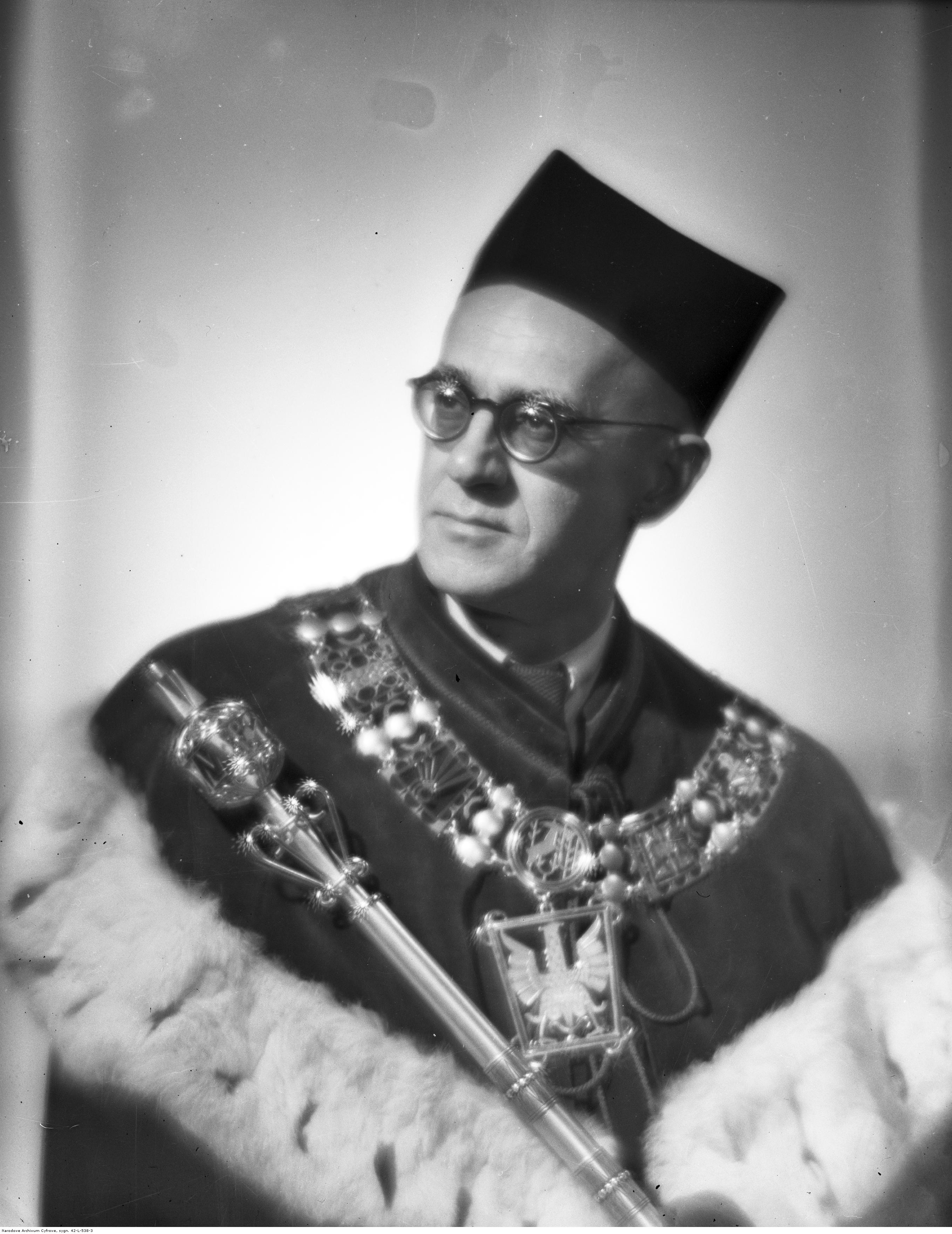
- Aleksander Wolter
- Born: 3 August 1905; Lviv
- Died: 11 June 1967 (aged 61); Lublin
- Occupations: Jurist, judge

Academic background
- Education: Jagiellonian University

Aleksander Wolter (3 August 1905 – 11 June 1967) was a jurist and judge.

== Biography ==
The son of Władysław and Aleksandra née Kamienobrodzka; brother of Władysław Wolter; grandson of Alfred Kamienobrodzki.

He specialized in civil law. From 1932 to 1939 he was a judge in Kraków. He was a member of Komisja Kodyfikacyjna. Since 1949 he was professor at the Maria Curie-Skłodowska University in Lublin. He was a judge of the Supreme Court of Poland from 1948 to 1951. He was organizer and, from 1950 to 1953, the first dean of the Law Faculty of the Maria Curie-Skłodowska University.

== Works ==
- Prawo cywilne. Część ogólna (1953)

== Accolades ==
- Officer's Cross of the Order of Polonia Restituta (1947)

== Commemoration ==
The meeting room of the Council of the Faculty of Law of the Maria Curie-Skłodowska University in Lublin is named after him.

== Bibliography ==
- Mateusz Grochowski, ed. (2010). "Profesor Aleksander Wolter w 105 rocznicę urodzin". Libri Iuristarum Lublinensium. Vol. 1 (II ed.). Lublin. pp. 12–17.
- Policzkiewicz, Zofia (1993). "Aleksander Wolter". In Radzik, Tadeusz; Skarbek, Jan; Witusik, Adam A. (eds.). Słownik biograficzny miasta Lublina. Vol. I. Wydawnictwo Uniwersytetu Marii Curie-Skłodowskiej. pp. 300–301.
- Policzkiewicz, Zofia (2009). "Aleksander Wolter (1905–1967)". In Anna Przyborowska-Klimczak (ed.). Profesorowie Wydziału Prawa i Administracji UMCS 1949–2009. Księga jubileuszowa z okazji 60-lecia Wydziału Prawa i Administracji UMCS w Lublinie. Lublin: Oficyna Wydawnicza VERBA. pp. 366–369.
