= Faculty of Law and Administration of the Jagiellonian University =

Coordinates: 50°3′39″N 19°55′58″E

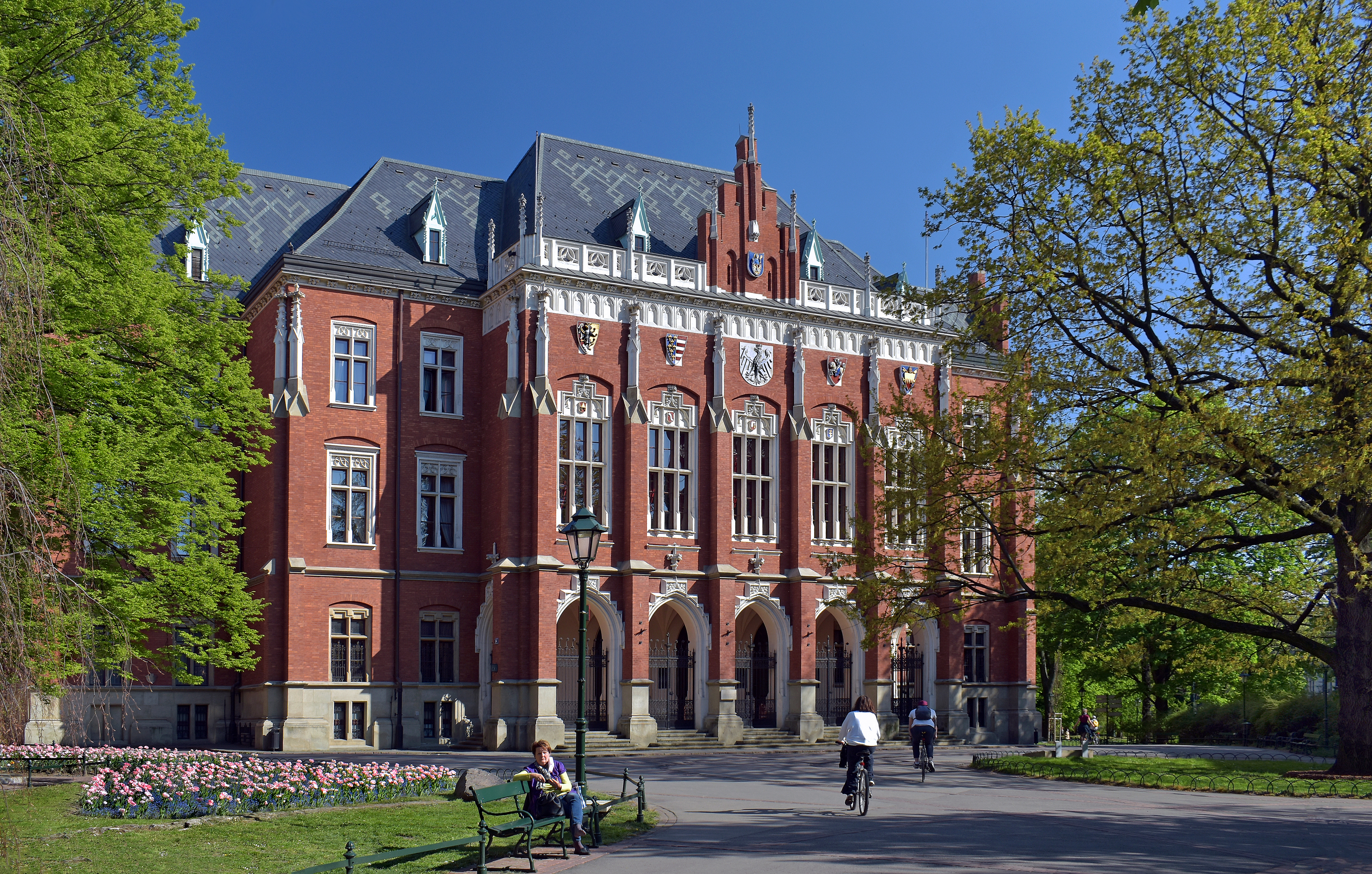
Faculty of Law and Administration of the Jagiellonian University
Established	1364
Type	Public
Dean	Prof. dr hab. Piotr Dobosz
Students	7,726
Academic teachers	145
Location	Kraków, Poland
Campus	Urban
Website	Website

Faculty of Law and Administration is the oldest unit of the Jagiellonian University. In 1364, when the University was established, 8 out of 11 chairs were devoted to legal sciences. At the beginning only courses in Canon Law and Roman Law were available. At present, the faculty is recognised as the best law faculty in Poland with the best bar passage rates and one of the finest in Central Europe.

In 1851 the first student scientific association in Poland was founded here (TBSP UJ).

== Studies ==
The programme of studies is based on individual students' choices. Magister's long-cycle programme in Law contains a very limited number of obligatory courses (ex. penal law, constitutional law, civil procedure) while fundamental courses and courses of specialisation depend on students' preferences.

Study programmes

The Faculty conducts one long-cycle 5-year Master's degree programme (magister) in Law, one first-cycle 3-year Bachelor's degree programme (licencjat) in Administration and second-cycle 2-year Master's degree programmes (magister) in Administration and Local Self-Government Administration.

Several postgraduate programmes are conducted in Polish as well as in other languages, e.g. LL.M. Polnisches Wirtschaftsrecht, LL.M. in American and International Business and Trade Law organised by the Columbus School of Law (Washington), Master en Droit Privé (M2) organised by the University of Orléans or LL.M. International Studies in Intellectual Property Law organised by the Institute of Intellectual Property Law (Faculty of Management and Social Communication) in cooperation with Dresden University of Technology.

Doctoral studies in legal sciences are available, including the European Postgraduate College - joint doctoral programme of the Jagiellonian University, University of Heidelberg and Johannes Gutenberg University of Mainz.

International cooperation

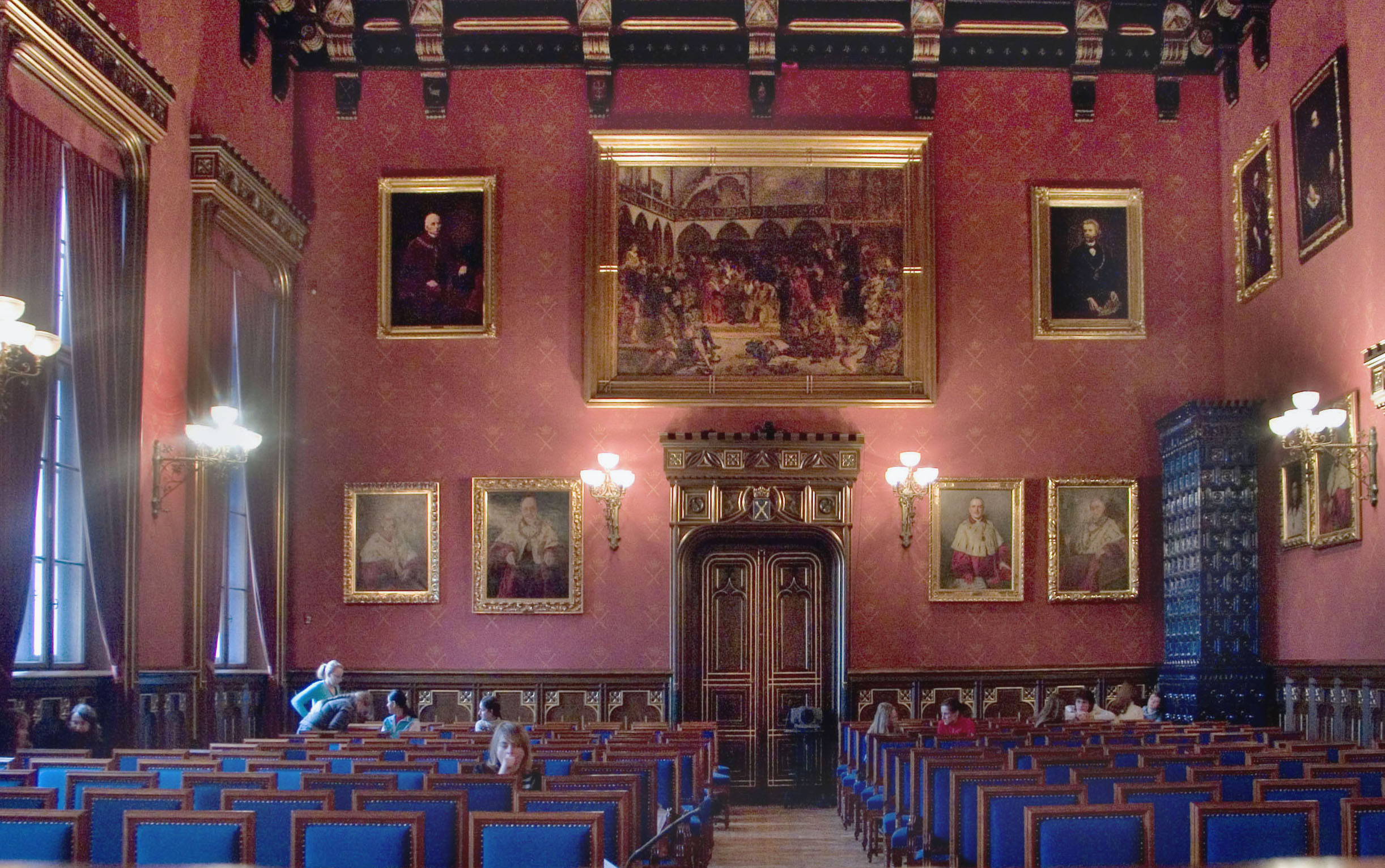
Aula of the Collegium Novum

The Faculty is well known for its international approach in legal education due to the programme of study, foreign degree programmes and several schools of foreign laws in Kraków and abroad:

- School of American Law - aside from the American Law Program (recognised as a part of the LL.M. programme of the Columbus School of Law) and multiple guest lectures, the School runs several special projects, e.g. workshops on negotiation, legal writing or translation, in cooperation with law offices and business institutions;
- School of German Law, whose courses are recognised as part of LL.M. programmes at cooperating German universities (University of Heidelberg and University of Mainz);
- School of French Law, whose graduates are automatically admitted to the Master's programme in Private Law organised by University of Orléans;
- School of Austrian Law, organised in cooperation with University of Vienna;
- Schule des Polnischen Rechts (School of Polish Law in German) - organised in cooperation with University of Heidelberg and University of Mainz;
- School of Polish and European Law at Lviv University (Ukraine);
- School of Polish and European Law at Ternopil National Economic University (Ukraine);
- School of Polish Law at Vilnius University (Lithuania).

Faculty of Law and Administration of the Jagiellonian University hosts the International Business and Trade Summer Law Program organised by The Catholic University of America (Columbus School of Law). This summer program has been authorized by the Accreditation Committee of the American Bar Association Section of Legal Education.

Aside from multiple exchange agreements in the framework of the ERASMUS programme (54 universities in 2009), the Faculty enjoys an exchange program with the Faculty of Law of the Kyiv-Mohyla Academy (Ukraine). University-wide exchange programmes are also open for the students of the Faculty.

== Most notable professors ==
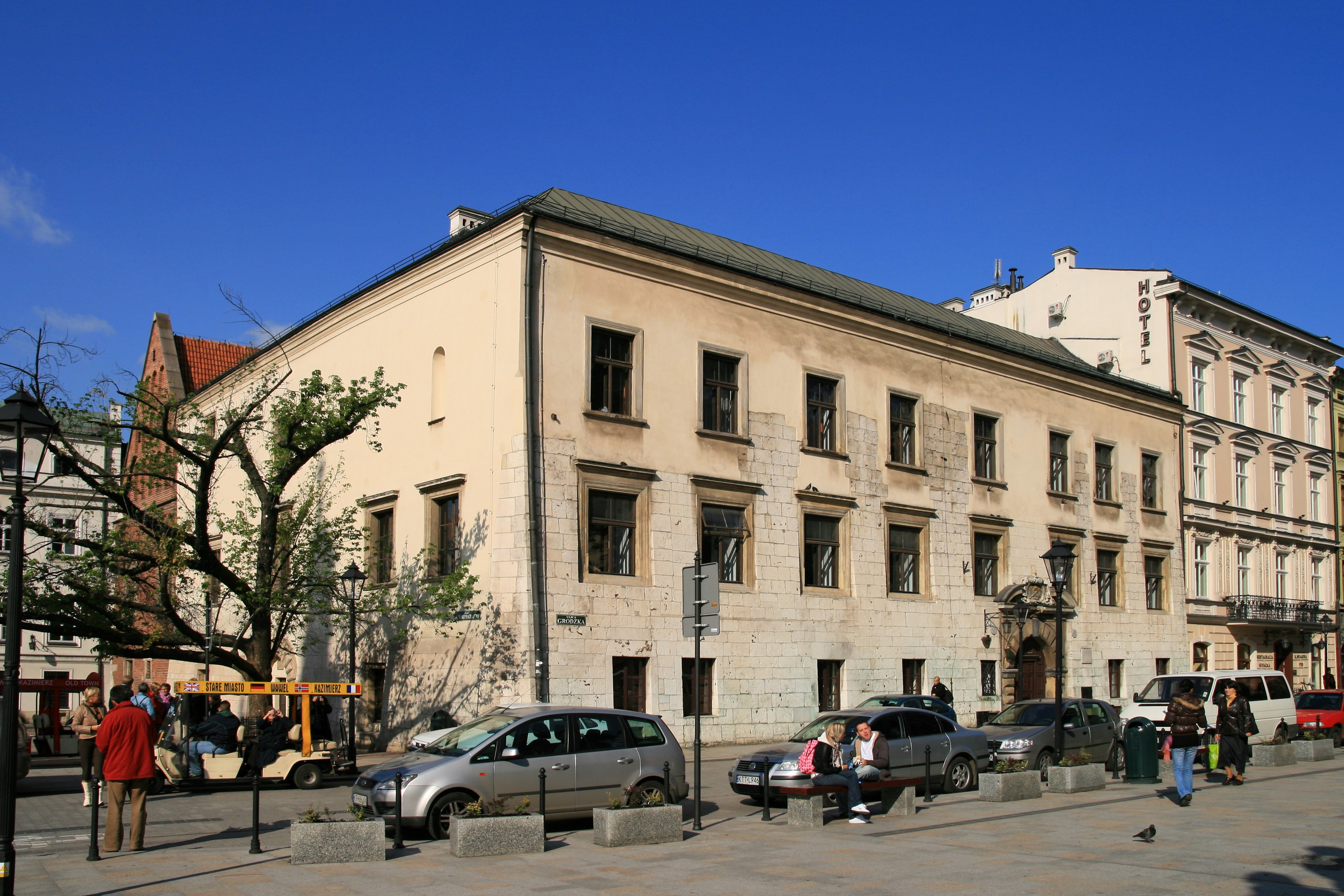
Collegium Iuridicum

- Stanisław of Skarbimierz (1360–1431), rector, theologian, lawyer, one of the most famous Just war theorists;
- Paweł Włodkowic (1370–1435), rector, lawyer, diplomat and politician, representative of Poland on the Council of Constance, where he presented a theory that all nations have the right to self-government and to live in peace. A forerunner of modern theories of human rights;
- Michael Bobrzynski (1849–1935), historian of Polish and German law, member of the Reichsrat, governor of Galicia;
- Stanisław Estreicher (1869–1935), rector, historian of law, bibliographer, caught in Sonderaktion Krakau, died in Sachsenhausen concentration camp;
- Stanisław Kutrzeba (1876–1946), rector, member of the Polish delegation at the Treaty of Versailles, General Secretary and president of Polish Academy of Learning, arrested by Nazis during Sonderaktion Krakau, deputy to the State National Council;
- Andrzej Zoll (born 1942), professor of penal law, former judge and president of the Constitutional Tribunal, former Ombudsman, former president of the Electoral Commission, former president of the Legislative Council, co-author of the Polish Penal Code of 1997.

At present, the faculty includes judges of the Constitutional Tribunal, the Supreme Court and the Supreme Administrative Court, as well as co-authors of the most important legal acts in contemporary Poland (such as the Constitution, the Penal Code, the Code of Commercial Partnerships and Companies or the local self-government acts).

== Organisation ==
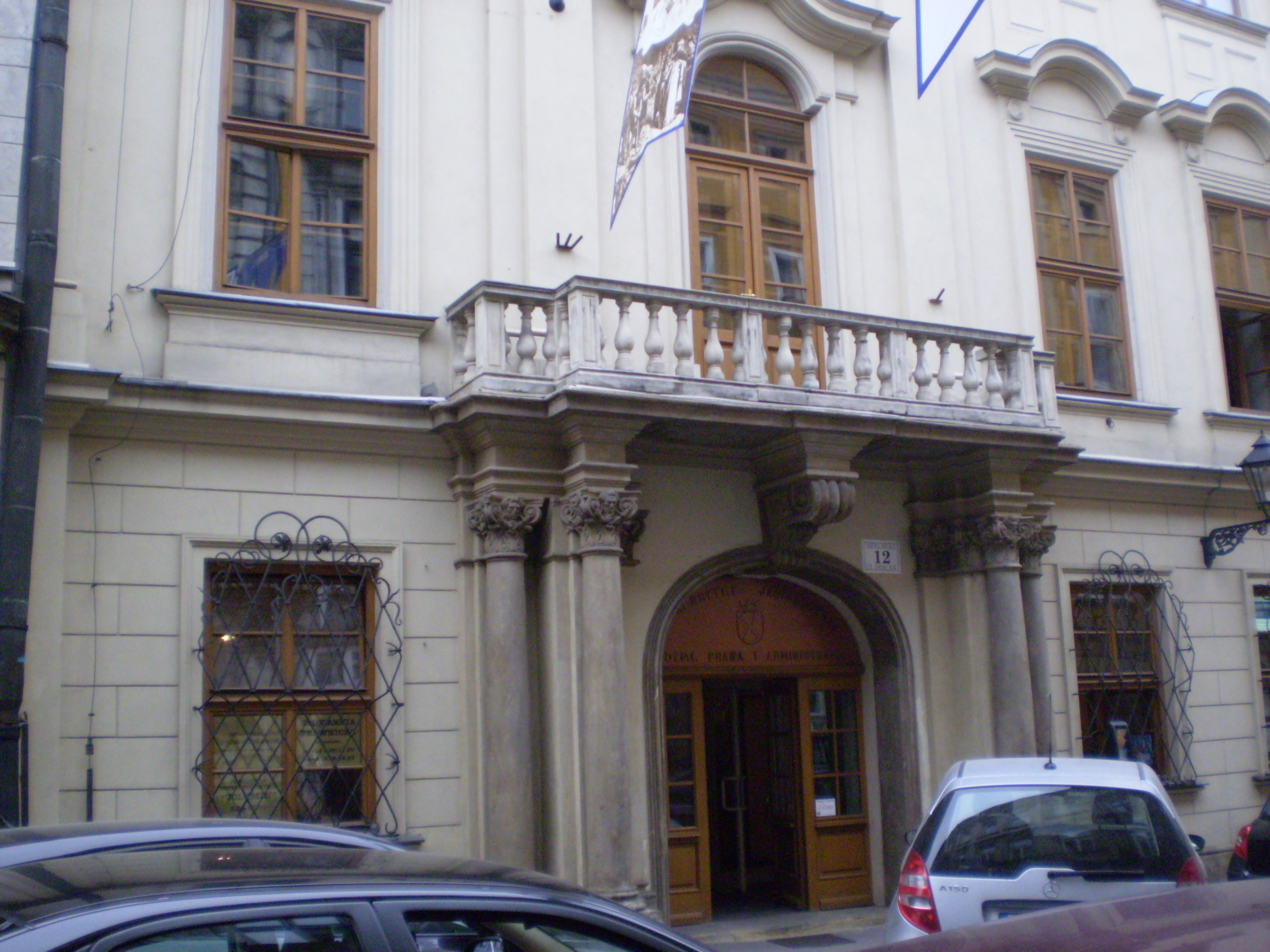
Larische Palace

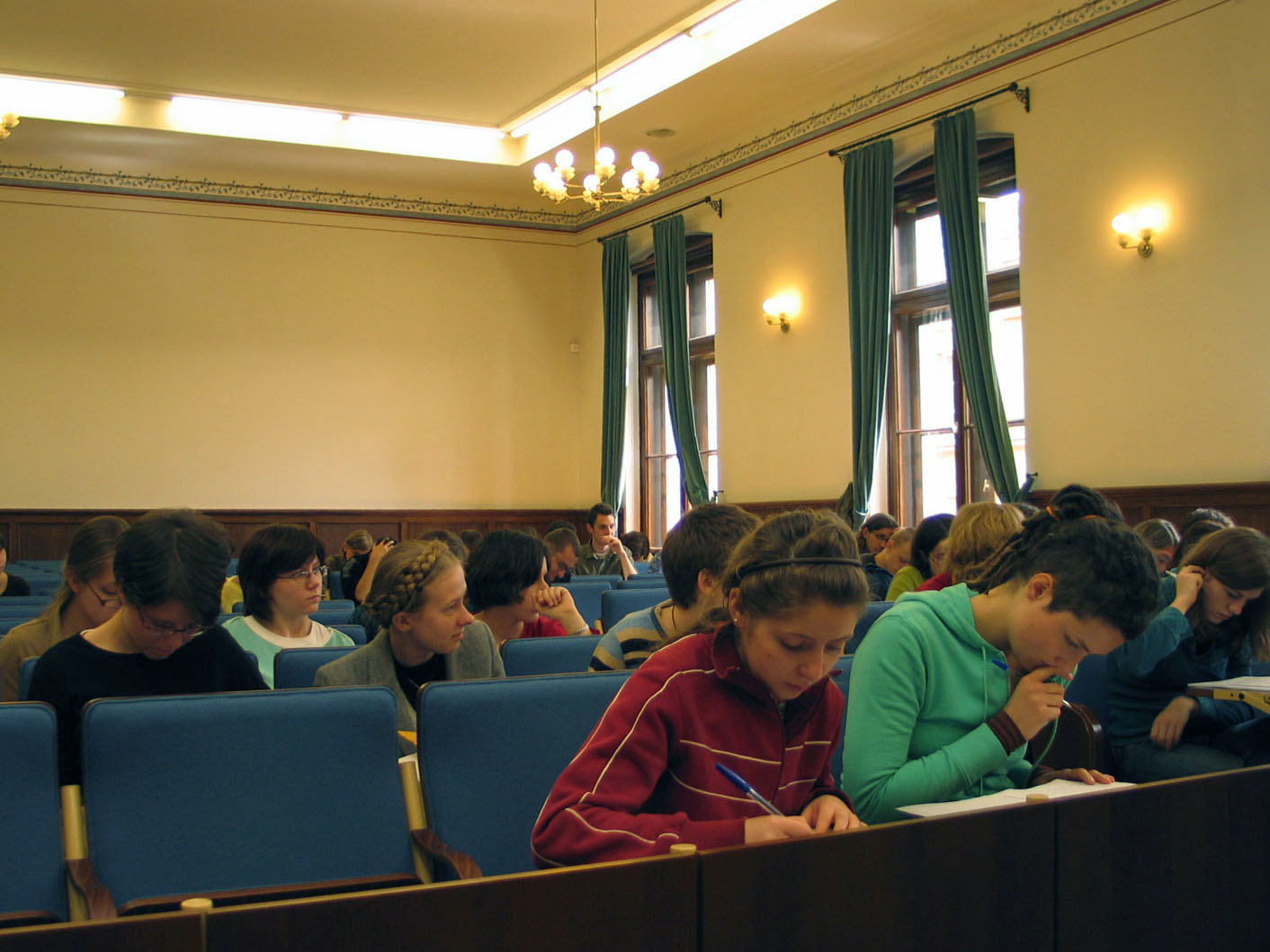
Collegium Novum – lecture

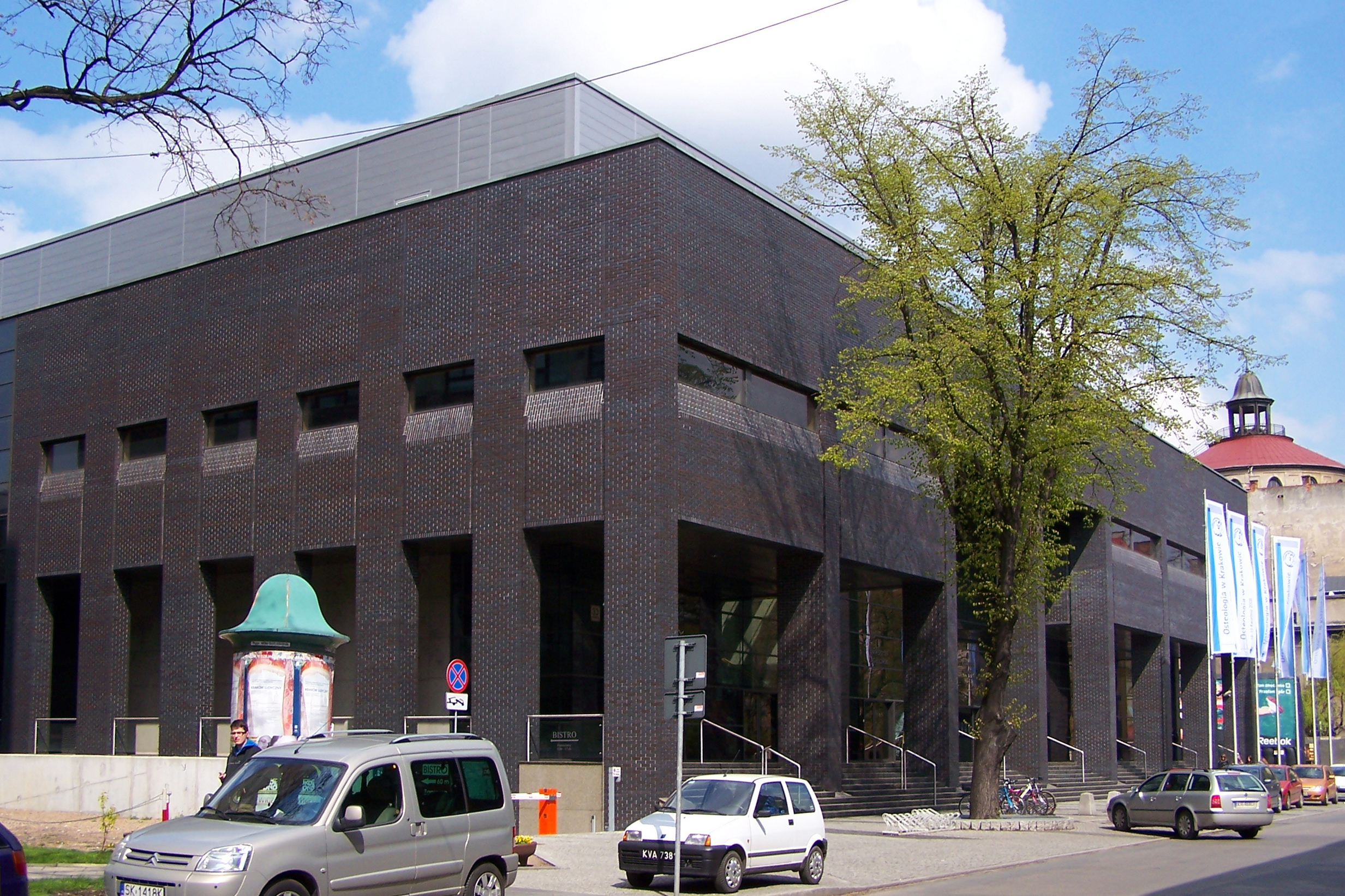
Auditorium Maximum

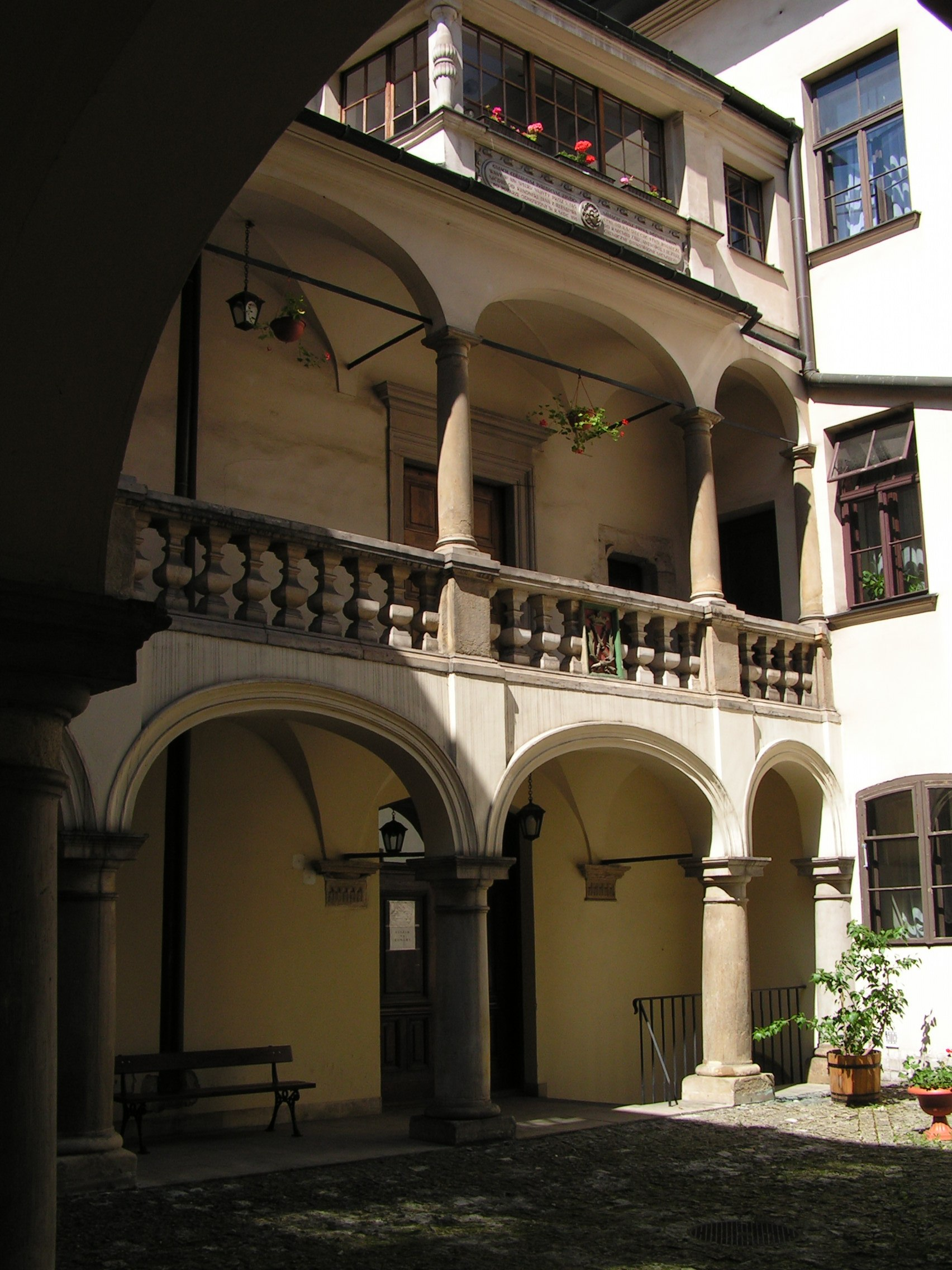
Collegium Iuridicum

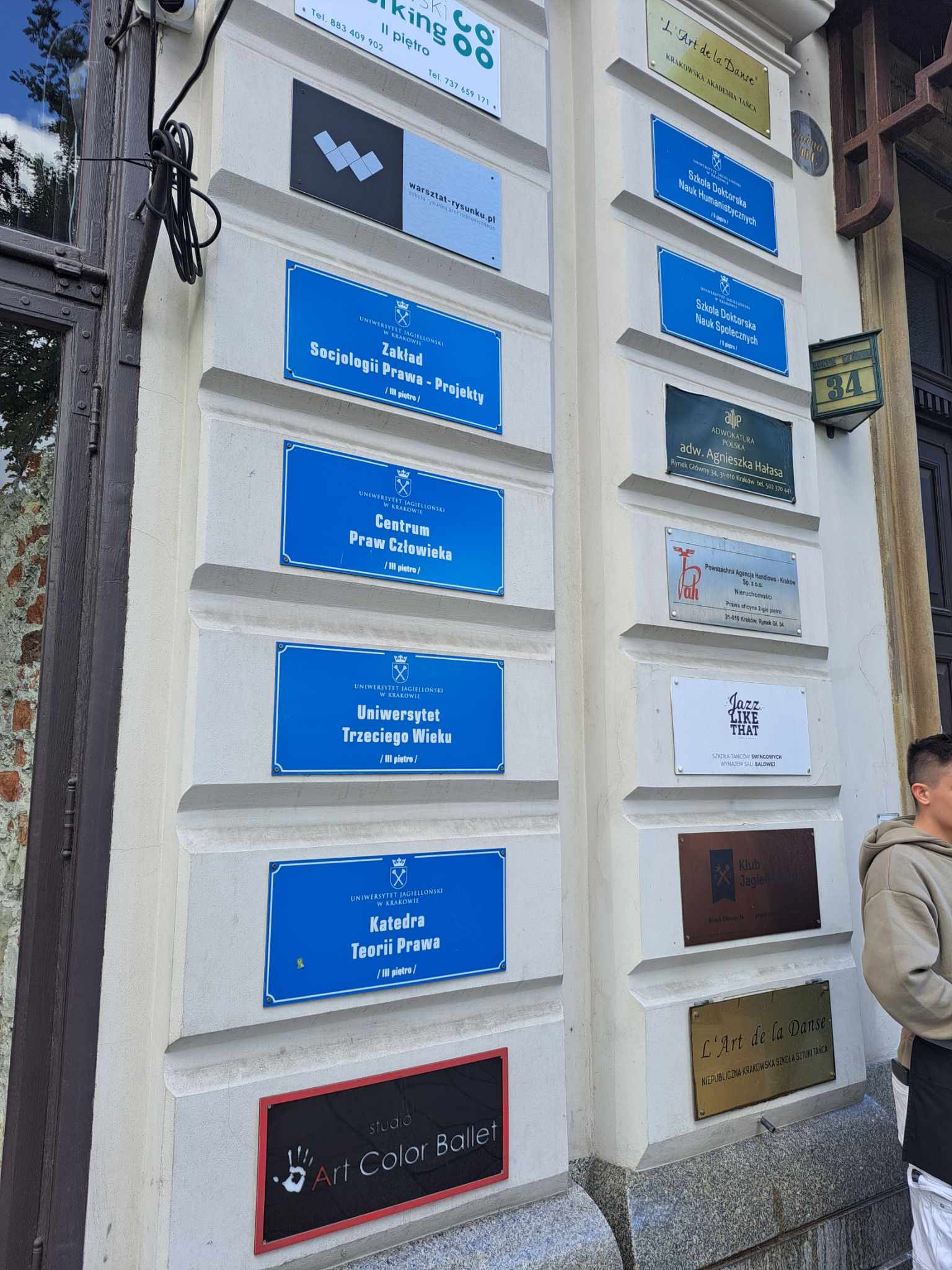
Chair of Sociology of Law, Human Rights Centre and Chair of Theory of Law

- Chair of Roman Law *
- Chair of Church Law and Law on Religious Denominations *
- Chair of General Constitutional and Legal History
- Chair of Polish Legal History *
- Chair of History of Administration and Administrative Ideas *
- Chair of European Law *
- Chair of Civil Law *
  Centre for Law of Immaterial Goods
  Centre for Banking Law
- Chair of Private International Law *
- Chair of Agricultural Law *
- Chair of Civil Procedure *
- Chair of Private Business Law *
  Centre for Banking Law
  Centre for Commercial Law
  Centre for Law on International Commercial Circulation
- Chair of Penal Law *
  Centre for Bioethics and Medical Law
  Centre for Comparative Penal Law
- Chair of Criminology *
- Chair of Penitentiary Law *
- Chair of Criminalistics *
- Chair of Penal Procedure *
- Chair of Administrative Law *
- Chair of Law on Environmental Protection
- Chair of Public Business Law *
- Chair of History of Political and Legal Doctrines *
- Chair of Economic Policy *
- Chair of Administrative Procedure
- Chair of Financial Law *
- Chair of Constitutional Law *
- Chair of Public International Law
- Chair of Labour Law and Social Policy *
- Chair of Comparative Constitutional Law *
- Chair of Sociology of Law *
- Chair of Theory of Law
- Chair of Philosophy of Law and Legal Ethics
- Chair of Law of Territorial Self-Government *
- Polish-German Centre for Banking Law
- Counselling-in-Law Office *
- Human Rights Centre *
- Coordination Centre of Schools of Foreign Laws *
  School of American Law
  School of Austrian Law
  School of German Law
  School of French Law
  School of Ukrainian Law
- Law Library *
- Computer Workshop
- Law Students’ Library Association TBSP (est. 1851) *
- European Law Students’ Association ELSA Kraków *

Cooperating University units organising courses for law students:

- Institute of Intellectual Property Law * (Faculty of Management and Social Communication).
- Chair of Forensic Medicine * (Faculty of Medicine)
- Chair of Pathomorphology (Faculty of Medicine)
- Jagiellonian Language Centre
- Physical Education Section

Other cooperating units:

- Institute of Forensic Research (Ministry of Justice)

Before graduation from the Master of Laws programme, students are obliged to complete 10 obligatory courses, 11 out of 21 fundamental courses, 2-year seminar of specialisation in a chosen Chair, 3-month apprenticeship, and a number of courses of specialisation (about 100 courses available), which should allow students to obtain 300 ECTS credits. The degree is granted after submitting Master's thesis and passing Master's Examination before a commission appointed by student's Chair of specialisation.

== Location ==
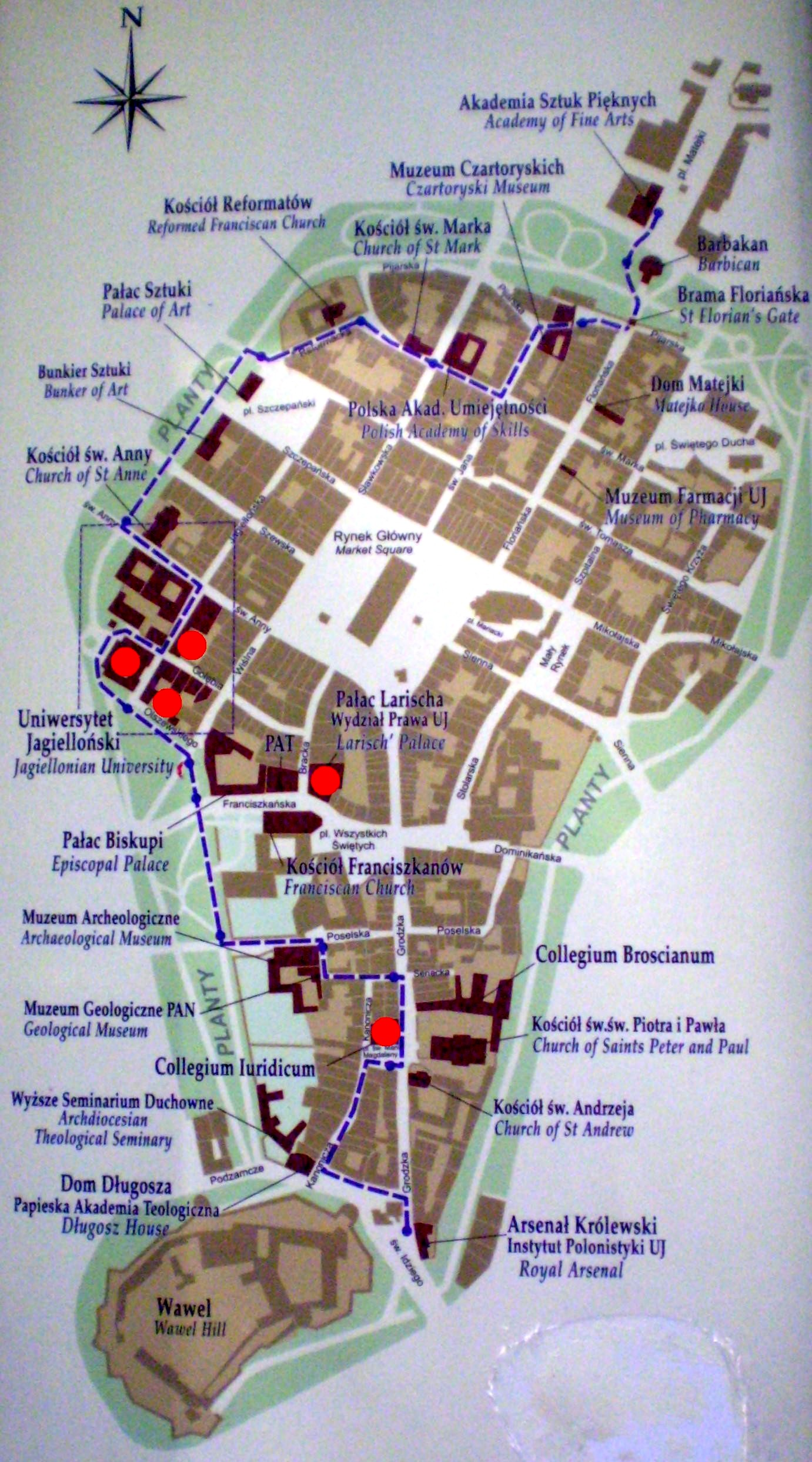
Faculty buildings, The Old Town district

Faculty buildings are situated in the historic centre of Kraków:

- Collegium Novum (Gołębia Street)
- Larische Palace (Bracka Street)
- Collegium Wróblewskiego (Olszewskiego Street)
- Collegium Iuridicum (Grodzka Street)
- Collegium Kołłątaja (Św. Anny Street)
- Auditorium Maximum (Krupnicza Street)

== See also ==
- Education in Poland
- Krystyna Chojnicka
- List of law faculties in Poland
- Lawyers in Poland
