= Krystyna Chojnicka =

Polish lawyer and political scientist

- Born: 1951 (age 74–75)
- Occupations: Lawyer, political scientist

Krystyna Chojnicka (born 1951) is a Polish lawyer and political scientist.

She finished her law degree and a PhD in political science at Jagiellonian University.

In 2008, she was voted the dean of the Faculty of Law and Administration at Jagiellonian University.

== Works ==
- Osoba i dzieło Piotra Wielkiego w dziewiętnastowiecznych sporach doktrynalnych o miejsce i przyszłość Rosji w Europie (1988)
- Rodowód literacki inteligencji rosyjskiej (1992)
- Nauczanie społeczne Kościoła od Leona XIII do Piusa XII (1993)
- Narodziny rosyjskiej doktryny państwowej: Zoe Paleolog - między Bizancjum, Rzymem a Moskwą (2001)
- Nauka społeczna Kościoła Katolickiego (zarys historii) (2001)
