= Raymond Wolters =

American historian (1938–2020)

- Born: July 25, 1938; Kansas City, Missouri
- Died: December 1, 2020 (aged 82); Naples, Florida
- Education: Stanford University; University of California, Berkeley
- Awards: 1985 American Bar Association Silver Gavel Award (for his book The Burden of Brown: Thirty Years of School Desegregation)
- Scientific career
- Fields: History
- Workplaces: University of Delaware
- Thesis: The Negro and the New Deal Economic Recovery Program (1967)
- Doctoral advisor: Charles Grier Sellers

Raymond Reilly Wolters (July 25, 1938 – December 1, 2020) was an American historian. He was the Thomas Muncy Keith Professor Emeritus of History at the University of Delaware, where he taught from 1965 until his retirement in 2014. He authored seven books. In 1985, his book The Burden of Brown: Thirty Years of School Desegregation won the American Bar Association's Silver Gavel award, a decision that proved controversial because the book was accused of being racist.

== Early life and career ==
Raymond Wolters was born in 1938, in Kansas City, Missouri. He attended two Catholic elementary schools in Los Angeles County CA and St. Francis Catholic High School in La Cañada Flintridge CA. He received a B.A. from Stanford University in 1960. He received a Ph.D. in history from the University of California, Berkeley in 1967. As a graduate student at UC-Berkeley, he participated in civil rights demonstrations in Berkeley, Oakland, and San Francisco.

He was a member of the faculty of the Department of History at the University of Delaware from 1965 until his retirement in 2014. During his career, he received grants from the American Council of Learned Societies, the American Philosophical Society, the Delaware Humanities Forum, the Earhart Foundation, the Crystal Trust, the Pew Charitable Trust (1999), and the U. S. Department of Education.

== Books ==
- 1970. Negroes and the Great Depression: The Problem of Economic Recovery. Praeger Publishers. How black leaders responded to the economic policies of President Franklin D. Roosevelt's New Deal.
- 1975. The New Negro on Campus: Black College Rebellions of the 1920s. Princeton University Press. The story of several black student rebellions during the 1920s.
- 1984. The Burden of Brown: Thirty Years of School Desegregation. Second Edition. University of Tennessee Press. Describes problems after the Brown v. Board of Education decision. Winner of the American Bar Association's annual Silver Gavel Award.
- 1996. Right Turn: William Bradford Reynolds, the Reagan Administration, and Black Civil Rights. Routledge. Describes how William Bradford Reynolds supported policies that called for non-discrimination but opposed affirmative discrimination.
- 2003. Du Bois and His Rivals. University of Missouri Press. Describes W. E. B. Du Bois and other African-American leaders in the early 20th Century.
- 2009. Race and Education, 1954-2007. University of Missouri Press. Discusses the difference between desegregation and racially balanced integration.
- 2015. The Long Crusade: Profiles in Education Reform, 1967-2014. Washington Summit Publishers. Discusses decades of failed school reforms.

== Controversy ==
In 2017, after reviewing the book Making the Unequal Metropolis: School Desegregation and Its Limits in the American Historical Review (AHR), Wolters came under renewed criticism over his past writings for the white nationalist outlets, such as the magazine American Renaissance and think tank National Policy Institute. Many critics wrote letters to the AHR harshly criticizing its decision to publish Wolters' review of the book and calling for the review to be retracted. The interim editor of the AHR, Robert Schneider, subsequently issued an apology for publishing Wolters' review, stating that "The AHR deeply regrets both the choice of the reviewer and aspects of the review itself."

== Death ==
Wolters died on December 1, 2020, at his winter home in Naples, Florida. He was 82 years old. He was survived by his wife, three children, and four grandchildren.
