= Stefan Mieczysław Grzybowski =

Stefan Mieczysław Grzybowski (16 November 1902 – 23 November 2003) was a full professor of law at the Jagiellonian University.

== Early life and education ==
Grzybowski was born in Zator, Poland; his father, Stefan Marian Grzybowskiwas a physician. He graduated in law from the Jagiellonian University in 1926, and defending his Ph.D. on the subject of the legal nature of a public commercial company in 1927. In 1931, the Scientific Culture Fund granted him a scholarship to study abroad and three years later he published his habilitation thesis titled Personal protection of the attitude towards the work after the artist's death - general issues.

== Career ==
Grzybowski served as an associate professor at the Jagiellonian University, becoming the head of its Department of Labor Law. When World War II broke out, Grzybowski joined Border Protection Corps in Stryj defending the city from Soviet invaders. Despite the defeat, he avoided capture by emigrating to Hungary where he became a scientific and literary manager for the Polish Library publications.

He twice avoided capture, until he was apprehended in January 1945 and transported to a POW camp in Austria. Following the detention there, he, and other prisoners, were transported to Luckenwalde and Feurstenberg. He escaped the camp again, a year later, and returned to Kraków where from 1946 to 1949 he served as a lecturer at the Cooperative Study of the Faculty of Agriculture and Forestry of the Jagiellonian University and at the College of Social Science; he was appointed Professor in 1949. In 1948, he was appointed rector at the Polish Academy of Commerce which later integrated into the University of Economics. He resigned as rector post in 1952, but following the death of Frederick Zoll became manager of the Department of Civil Law at the Faculty of Law of the Jagiellonian University.

Grzybowski attained a full professor rank at the Jagiellonian University in 1949 and in October 1956 was promoted to vice-rector for General Affairs and then as the rector of the Jagiellonian University from 1958 to 1962. He then became a dean of the Faculty of Law at the same institutiont.

In 1991, he was awarded the Grand Cross of the Order of Polonia Restituta by President Lech Wałęsa.
