= Edmund Krzymuski =

Polish jurist, professor of criminal law (1851 – 1928)

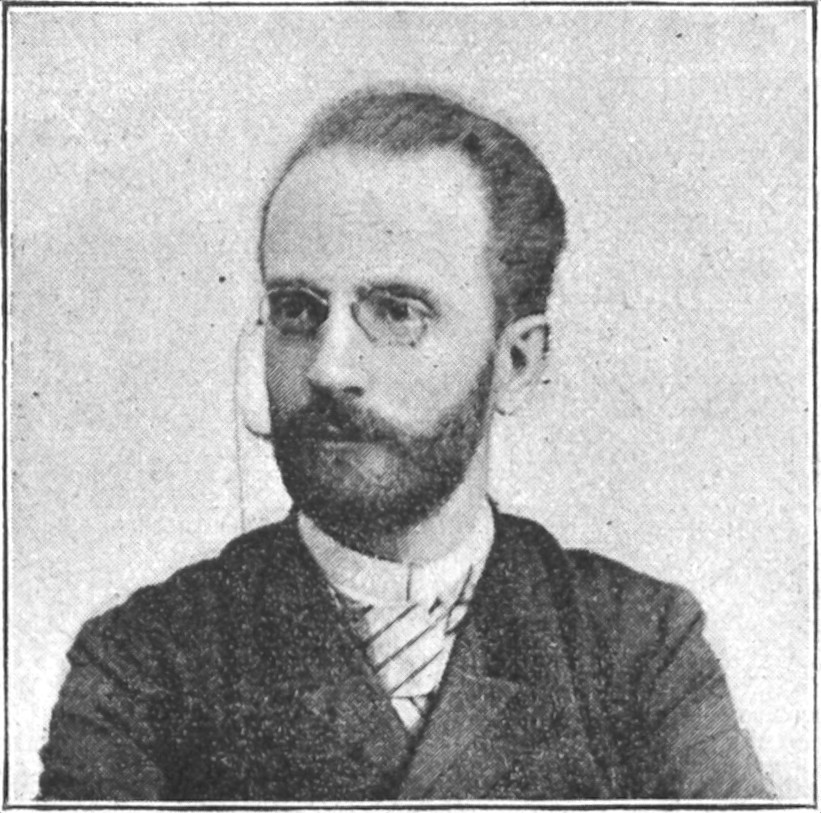
Edmund Krzymuski, 1893

Edmund Krzymuski (1851 – 1928) was a Polish scholar of criminal law.

After studies in Kraków, Warsaw, Heidelberg, Berlin and Leipzig, he taught criminal law and criminal procedure at the Jagiellonian University of Kraków beginning in 1884, and briefly served as its rector. Krzymuski was a member of the Codification Commission of the Second Polish Republic and contributed significantly to the codification of Polish criminal law and criminal procedure.
