= Franz-Erich Wolter =

German computer scientist

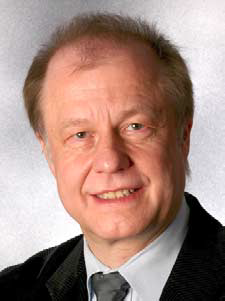
Franz-Erich Wolter

Franz-Erich Wolter is a German computer scientist, chaired professor at Leibniz University Hannover, with research contributions especially in computational (differential) geometry and haptic/tactile Virtual reality.

He currently heads the Institute of Man-Machine Communication and is the Dean of Studies in Computer Science at Leibniz University Hannover.

He is the founder and actual director of the Welfenlab research laboratory.

== Research ==
Wolter's early contributions were in the area of Differential Geometry dealing with the Cut Locus characterizing it as the closure of a set, where the shortest geodesics starting from a point (or a general source) set intersect or equivalently where the distance function is not directionally differentiable implying that a complete Riemannian manifold M must be diffeomorphic to R^n if there is a point p on M s.t. the (squared) distance function wrt. to p is (directionally) differentiable on all M. His Ph.D. thesis (1985) transferred the concept of Cut Locus to manifolds with and without boundary.

In 1992, essentially a specialisation of the latter works lead to his paper presenting a mathematical foundation of the medial axis of solid objects in Euclidean space. It showed that the medial axis of a solid body can be viewed as the interior Cut Locus of the solid`s boundary and the medial axis is a deformation retract of the solid. Therefore it represents the homotopy type of a solid thus including the solid's homology type. Furthermore the medial axis can be used to reconstruct the solid. Later on since 1997 the subject of the medial axis received a rapidly growing attention in computational geometry but also wrt. its applications in vision and robotics. A Voronoi diagram of a finite point set A in Euclidean space can be viewed as Cut Locus of that point set. In 1997, Wolter apparently pioneered computations of geodesic Voronoi diagrams and geodesic medial axis on general parametrized curved surfaces. In the surface case the length of a shortest geodesic join defines the distance between two points. In 2007, Wolter extended the computations of geodesic Voronoi diagrams and geodesic medial axis (inverse) transform to Riemannian 3D-manifolds.

Wolter's early works on computing Riemannian Laplace Beltrami spectra for surfaces and images lead to a patent application in (2005) for a method using those spectra as Shape DNA for recognizing and retrieving surfaces, solids and images from data repositories.

His works used the heat trace of a Riemannian Laplace Beltrami operator wrt. a surface patch to numerically compute area, length of boundary curves and Euler Characteristic of the patch. All this later on stimulated research in the area of spectral shape analysis wrt. shape retrieval and shape analysis, including applications in biomedical shape cognition and especially using the heat kernel more precisely the heat trace for partial shape cognition and the global point signature.

Wolter was responsible for creating model and software for the haptic/tactile renderer of the visuo-haptic-tactile Virtual Reality (VR) system HAPTEX – HAPtic sensing of virtual TEXtiles, developed as multinational EU-project (2004-2007). (Haptic and tactile perception are considered as different with tactile referring to perception obtained via mechano receptors in the skin from lightly touching a surface while haptic perception caused by more forceful mechanical interaction with an object perhaps deforming it). HAPTEX appears to be the only VR-System allowing simultaneously a combined haptic and tactile perception of multi point haptic interaction with computer generated deformable objects, c.f. Under Wolter's guidance research on the haptic and tactile renderer of HAPTEX resulted in two doctoral theses of his students published as monographies by Springer, cf.

More recently Wolter's works have covered research on volumetric biomedical visualization systems, (YaDIV), and haptic tactile VR-Systems currently including haptic interaction with medical volumetrically presented MRI and CT data.

== Biography ==
Prof. Wolter received a Diploma in Mathematics and Theoretical Physics from the Free University of Berlin and a Ph.D. (1985) in Mathematics from Technische Universität Berlin. After his Ph.D., before switching to an academic career, he had been working as software and development engineer in the electrical industry for AEG. Prior to coming to Hannover, he held faculty positions at the University of Hamburg (Germany), at MIT (USA) and at Purdue University (USA).

Early on and throughout his career, Wolter hold for extended periods various positions as a visiting professor at well known schools including especially MIT (three times), Nanyang Technical University, Purdue University. He has been presenting seminars at many prestigious Universities including: Harvard, Yale, Stanford, Brown University, MIT and more recently in Asia: Tsinghua University, Zheiyang University, and Nanyang Technical University. He gave Keynote Speeches at CGI 2000 and CGI 2010, covering major parts described in the above research section.

Wolter is an associate editor of the Springer Journal "The Visual Computer". He had been General Chair of the international conferences: Computer Graphics International 1998, Cyberworlds and NASAGEM 2007, Computer Graphics International 2013.

== Awards and honors ==
Wolter's article on the computation of geodesic Voronoi diagrams on parametric surfaces received the best paper award of CGI 1997. His paper on "Laplace Beltrami Spectra as Shape DNA" received the most cited paper award of the CAD journal in 2009. His joint paper with partners of the EU funded Haptex project received the best applied paper award of JVR - journal.
