= Bracka Street, Kraków =

Street in Kraków, Poland

Bracka Street
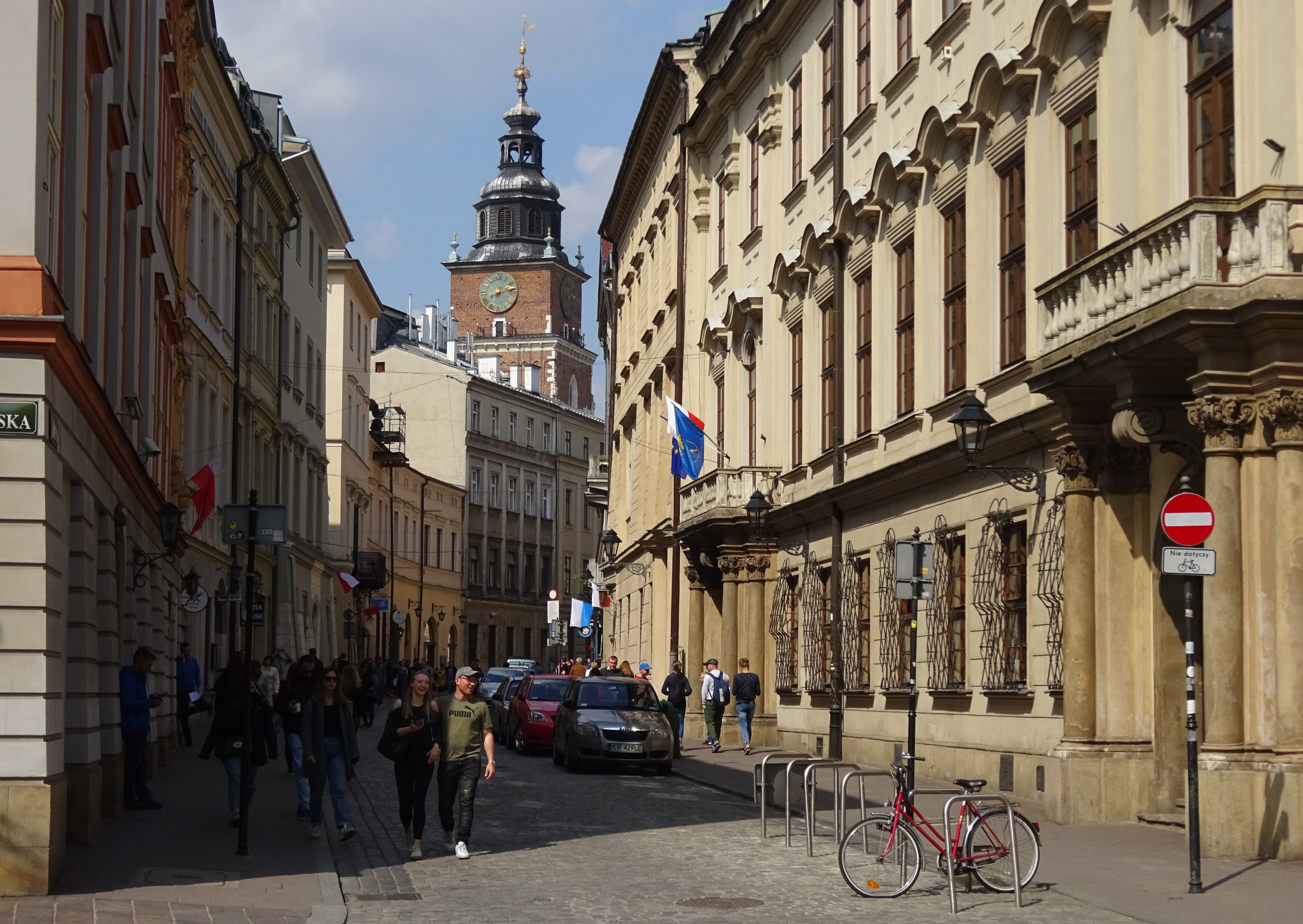
- View towards the north, onto the Main Square

- Part of: Kraków Old Town district
- Length: 175 m (574 ft)
- North end: Main Square
- South end: Church of St. Francis of Assisi

Bracka Street (Polish: Ulica Bracka, lit. Brothers Street) is a street in Kraków, Poland, in district Old Town.. The street begins heading south from the Main Square and on towards the Church of St. Francis of Assisi, also known as the Friars Minor, hence its name "Brothers Street".

Unlike other streets heading away from the Main Square, the street is not perfectly straight, but instead is slightly curved. This curvature in the street proves the existence of a dwelling in its way prior to Kraków receiving town rights in 1257, which had to be accounted by contemporary urbanists. The street is short but is home to several historical sites.

== Gallery ==
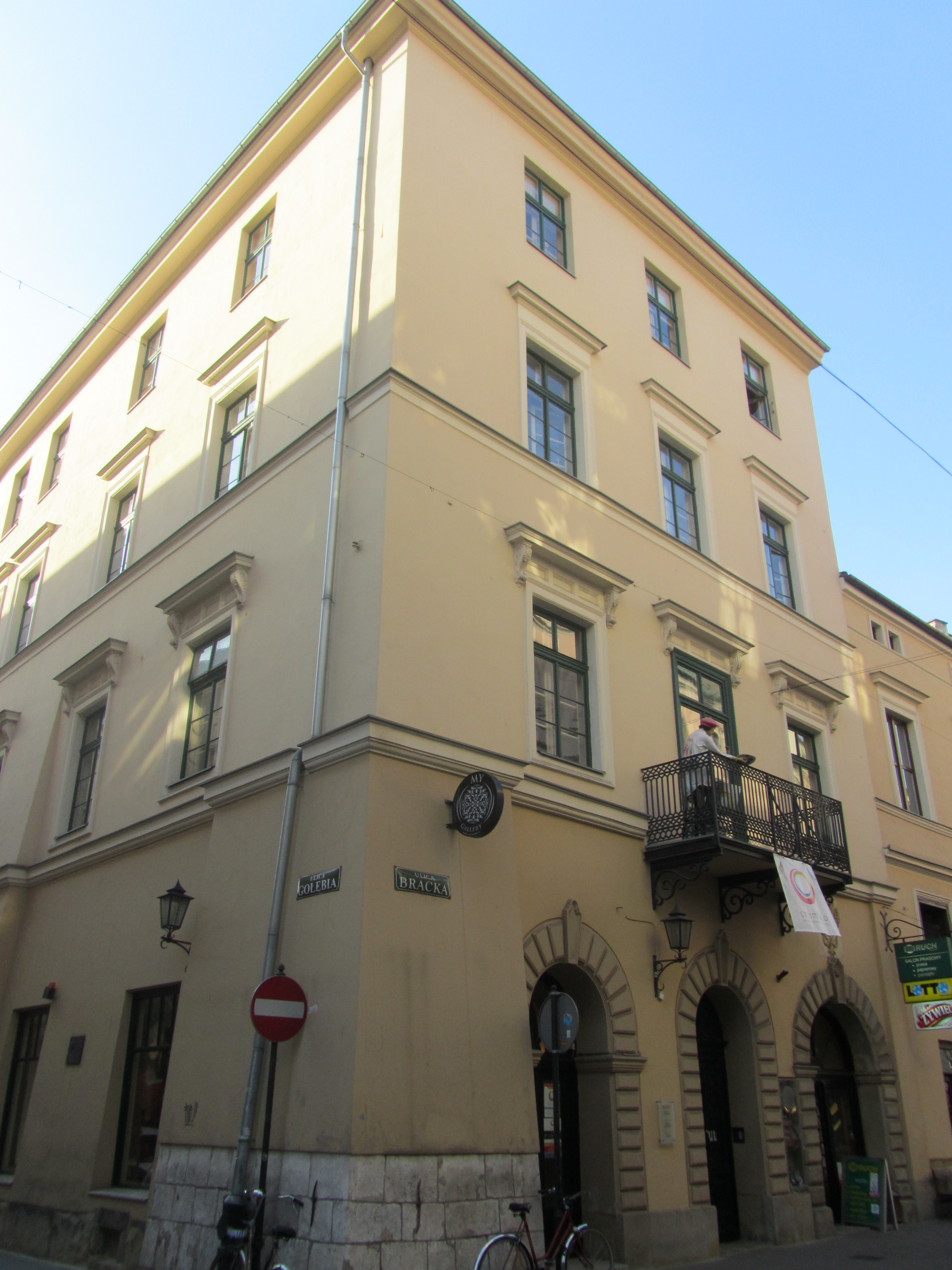
House No. 7

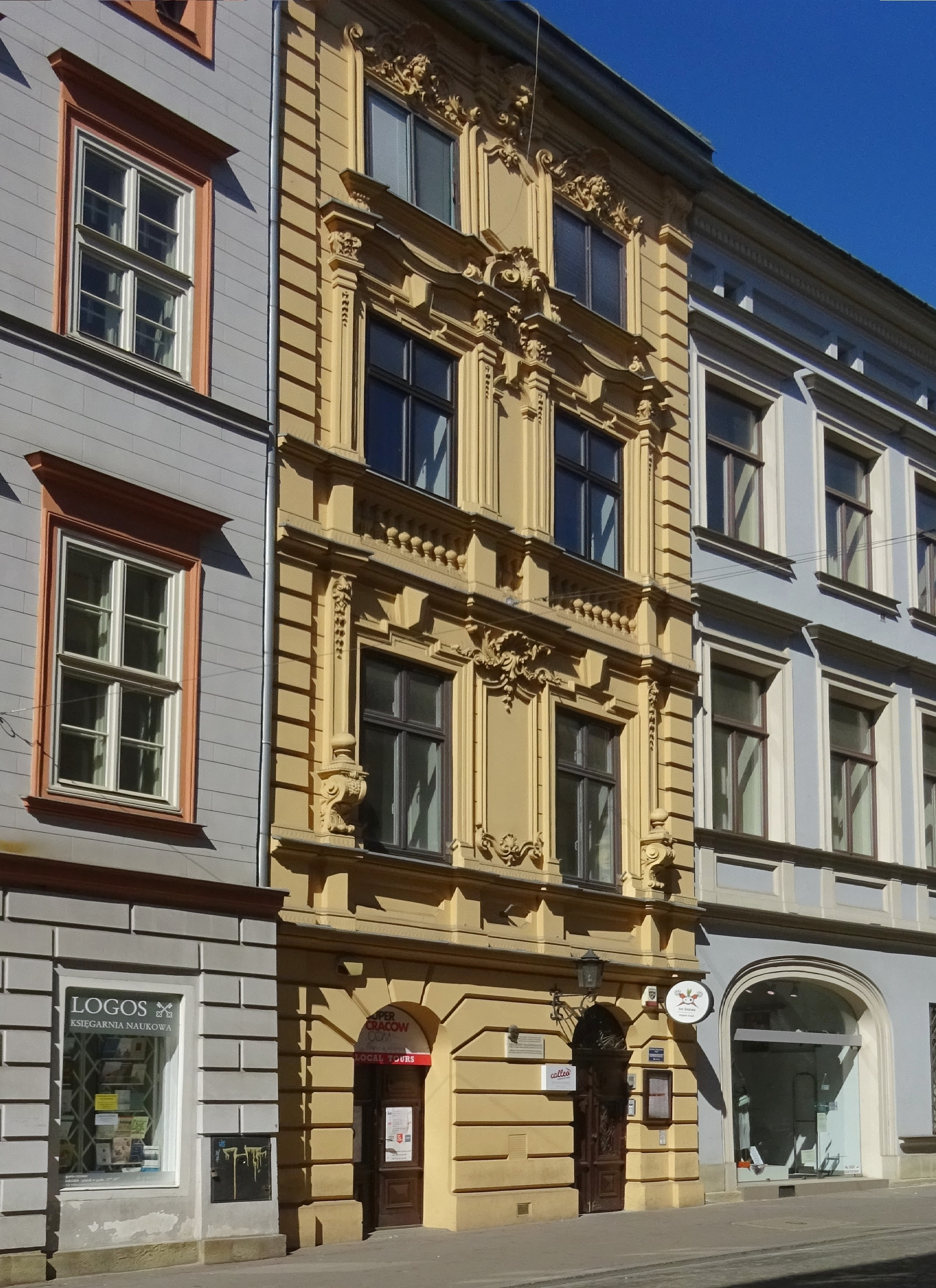
House No. 15

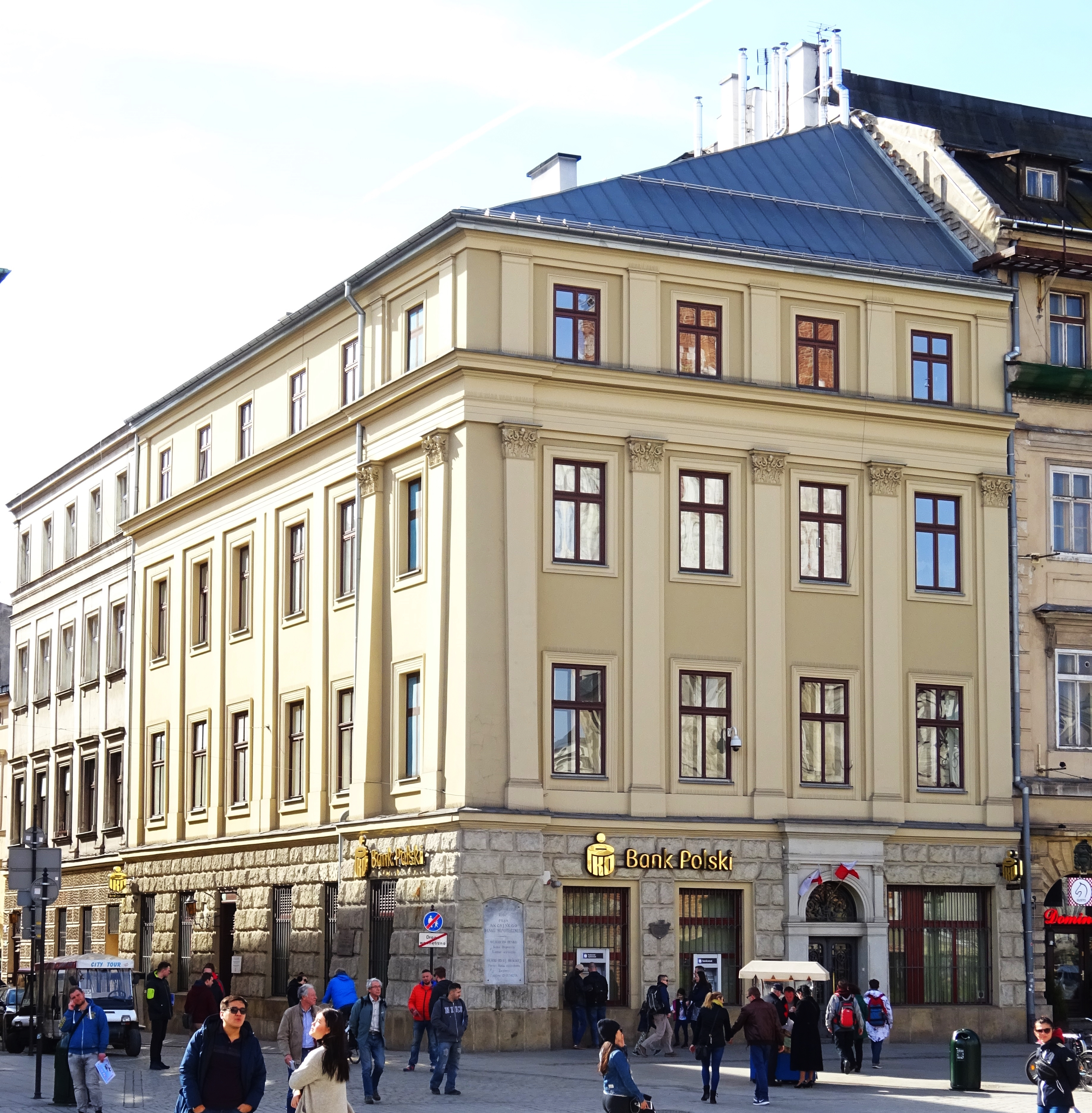
Evangelist's House, No. 21
