= Władysław Wolter =

Polish jurist (1897–1986)

- Born: 5 February 1897; Vienna
- Died: 18 March 1986 (aged 89); Kraków
- Occupation: Jurist

Academic background
- Education: Jagiellonian University

Władysław Wolter (5 February 1897 – 18 March 1986) was a jurist specializing in criminal law, professor at the Jagiellonian University.

== Biography ==
The son of Władysław and Aleksandra née Kamienobrodzka; brother of Aleksander Wolter; grandson of Alfred Kamienobrodzki. In 1915 he graduated from high school in Vienna. In 1921 he obtained doctorate from the Jagiellonian University. In 1925 he obtained habilitation. In 1928 he became head of the Department of Criminal Law and Criminal Procedure at the Jagiellonian University.

He was arrested on 6 November 1939 during Sonderaktion Krakau. He was a prisoner at the KL Sachsenhausen. He was released on 8 February 1940. In 1967 he was elected a member of the Polish Academy of Sciences.

His students included Kazimierz Buchała, Władysław Mącior, Maria Szewczyk, Andrzej Zoll, Marian Cieślak, Andrzej Gaberle, Tadeusz Hanausek and Franciszek Studnicki. He was buried at the Salwator Cemetery.

== Works ==
- Zarys systemu prawa karnego. 1933–1934.
- Studia z zakresu prawa karnego. 1947.
- Prawo karne. Zarys wykładu systematycznego. 1947.
- Nauka filozofii prawa i prawa karnego w Polsce. Polska Akademia Umiejętności. 1948. Co-authored with Kazimierz Opałek.
- Kumulatywny zbieg przepisów ustawy. 1960.
- Reguły wyłączania wielości ocen w prawie karnym. 1961.
- Funkcja błędu w prawie karnym. 1964.
- Nauka o przestępstwie. 1973.

== Accolades ==
- Medal of the 10th Anniversary of People's Poland (15 January 1955)
