= Walter (automobiles) =

Josef Walter and Co.
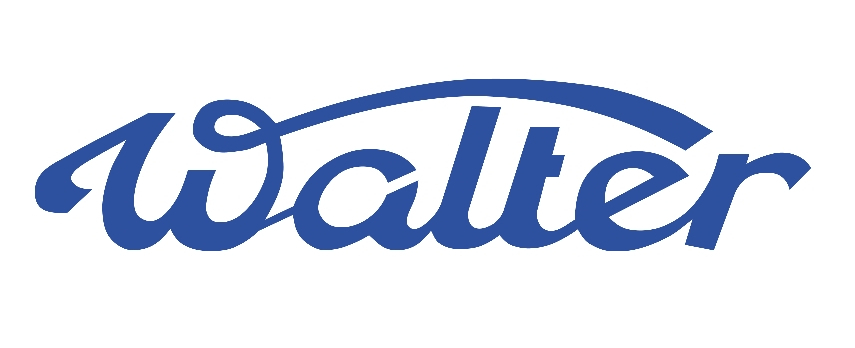
- Type: Subsidiary
- Industry: Automotive
- Founded: 1911
- Defunct: 1946
- Headquarters: Prague, Czechoslovakia

Walter was a manufacturer of motorcycles, motor tricycles and automobiles based in Prague, initially in Austria-Hungary and later in Czechoslovakia. Josef Walter opened his first workshop in 1898 and founded Walter a spol. in 1911. Two years later, the company began making cars at its new factory in Jinonice. It built passenger cars, trucks and buses, both to its own designs and under licence from Fiat.

Aircraft-engine production began in 1923 and gradually became the company’s main business. Production of Walter cars ended in the late 1930s. From 1946 to 1951, the Jinonice factory made chassis for the Aero Minor. The company was nationalised in 1945 and renamed Motorlet in 1949. It continued to manufacture aircraft engines as Walter Aircraft Engines.

== Historic names ==
- 1911–1919: J. Walter a spol.
- 1919–1932: Akciová továrna automobilů Josef Walter a spol.
- 1932–1946: Akciová společnost Walter, továrna na automobily a letecké motory

== History ==
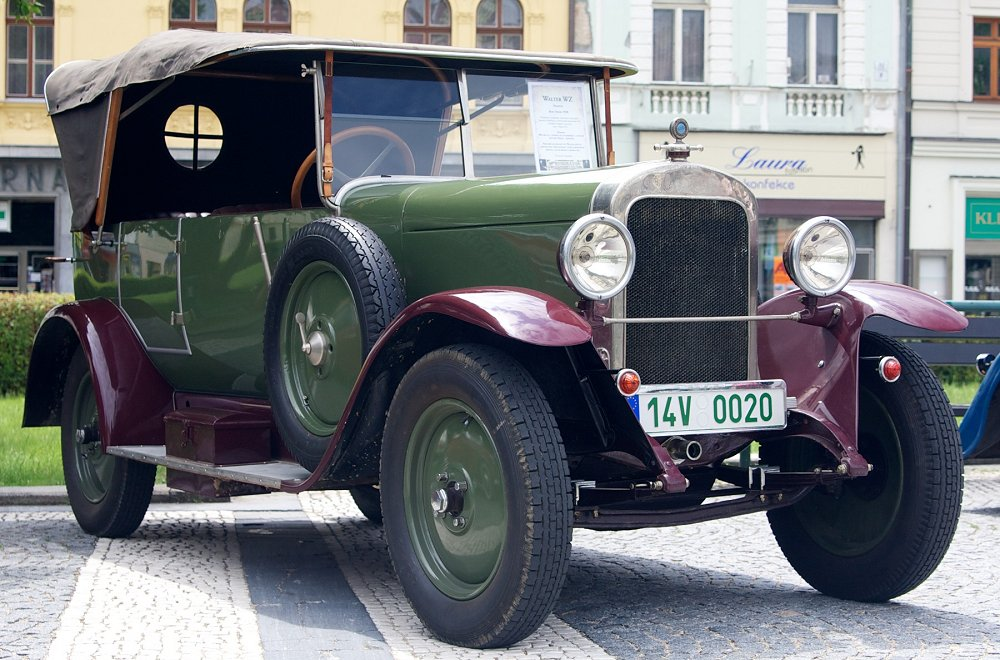
Walter WZ phaeton (1920)

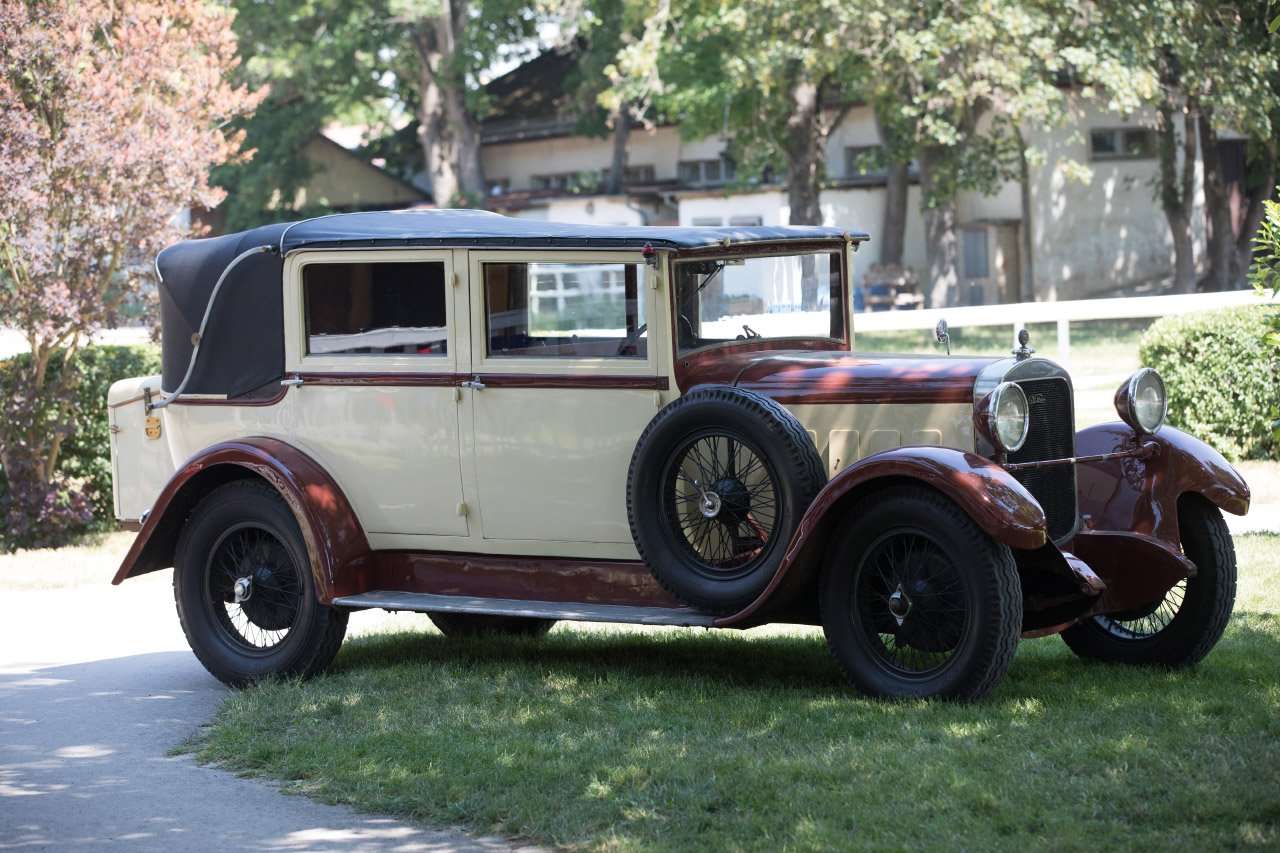
Walter P-IV sedan (1927)

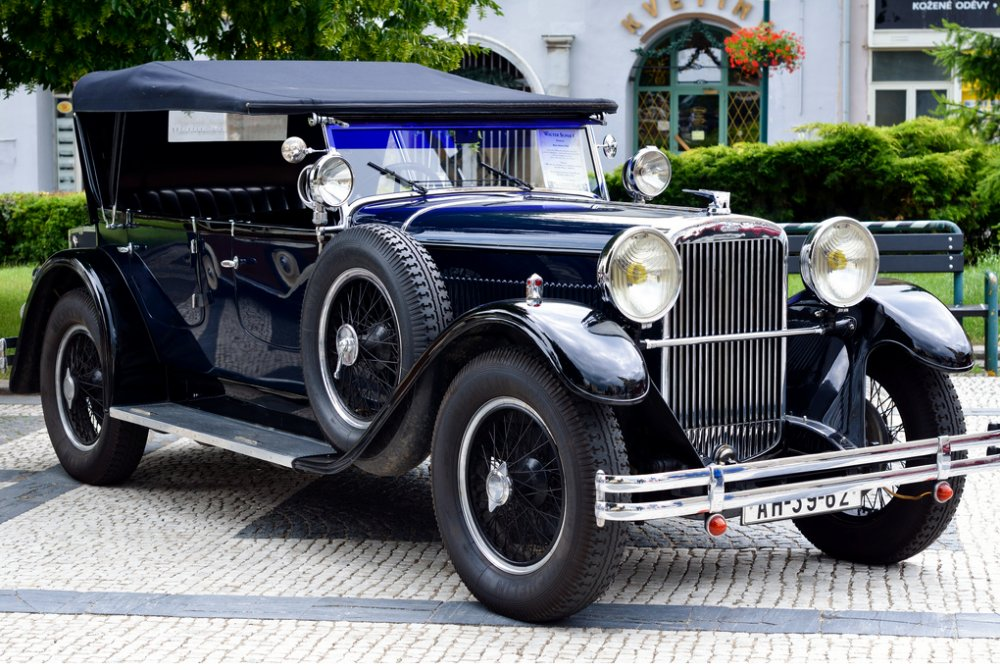
Walter Super 6 touring (1930)

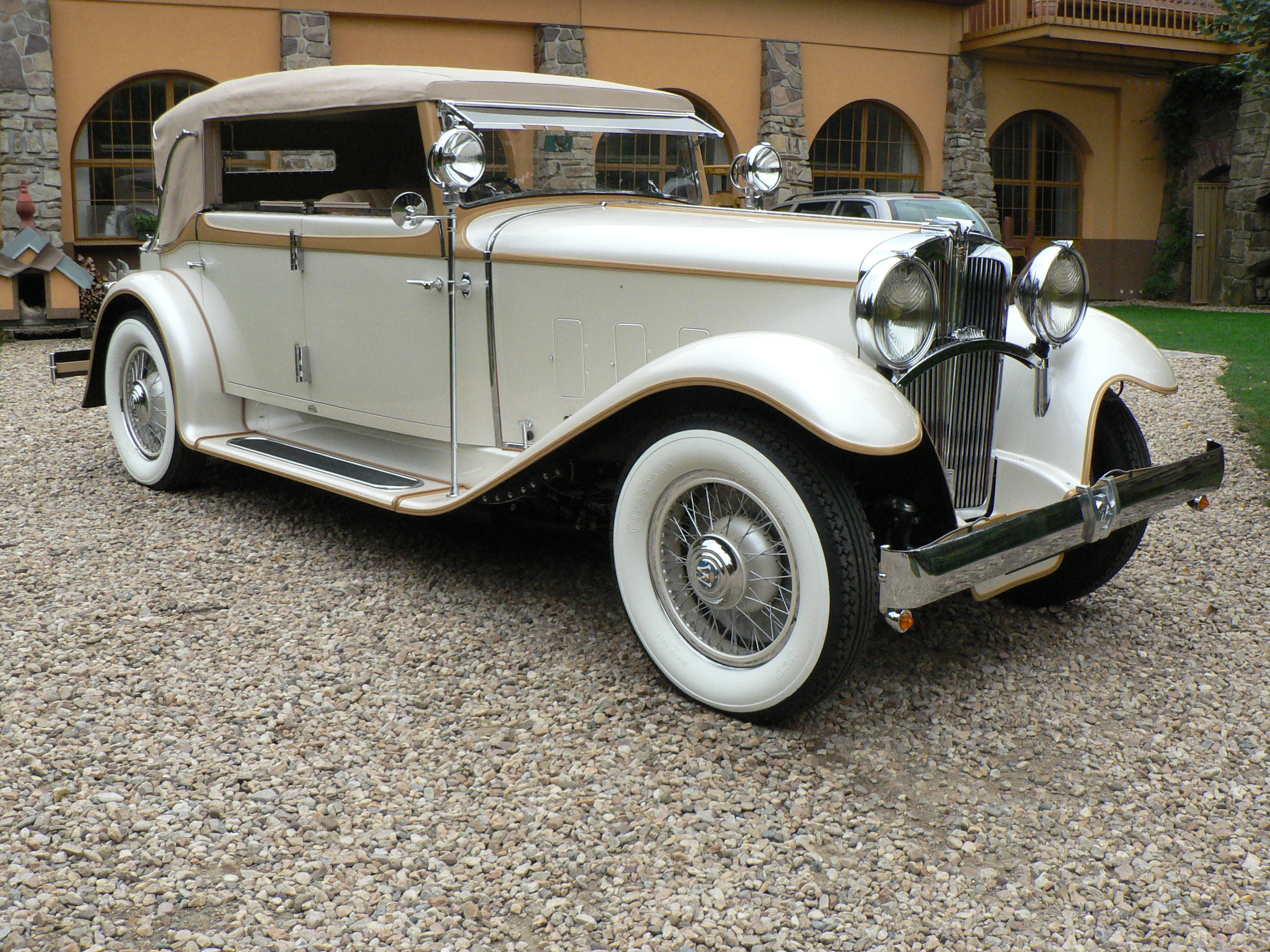
Walter Royal cabriolet (1931)

Josef Walter founded the company in 1911 to make motorcycles and motor tricycles. It started to make cars in 1913: firstly its own models Walter WI/WII/WII (1912–1914), Walter WZ/WIZ/WIZI (1919–1928), Walter P (1924–1928), Walter 4 B (1928–1930), Walter 6 B (1928–1931), Walter Super 6 (1930–1934), Walter Standard 6 (1930–1933), Walter Regent (1932–1937) and Walter Royal (1931–1932) and later the Walter Junior (Fiat 508), Walter Bijou (Fiat 514), Walter Princ (Fiat 522) and Walter Lord (Fiat 524) under licence.

By 1926 Walter was Czechoslovakia's fourth-largest car maker by sales volume. In 1929 it still held fourth place, and production peaked at 1,498 cars for the year. By 1932 Walter production had slumped to 217 cars for the year. The figure recovered to 474 in 1933 but fell again to 102 in 1936 and only 13 in 1937.

Walter ceased making cars in 1951.

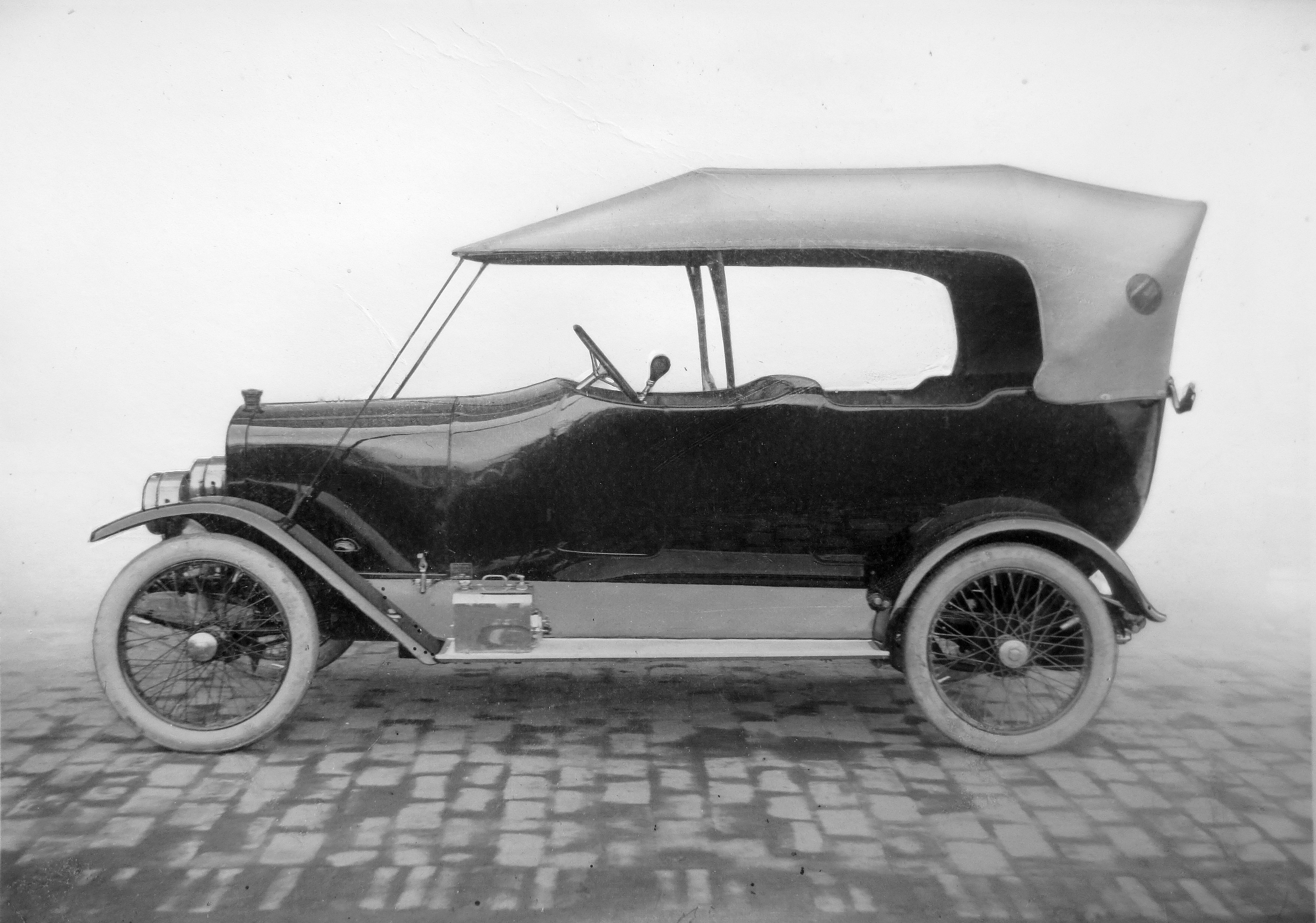
Walter W I (1913)

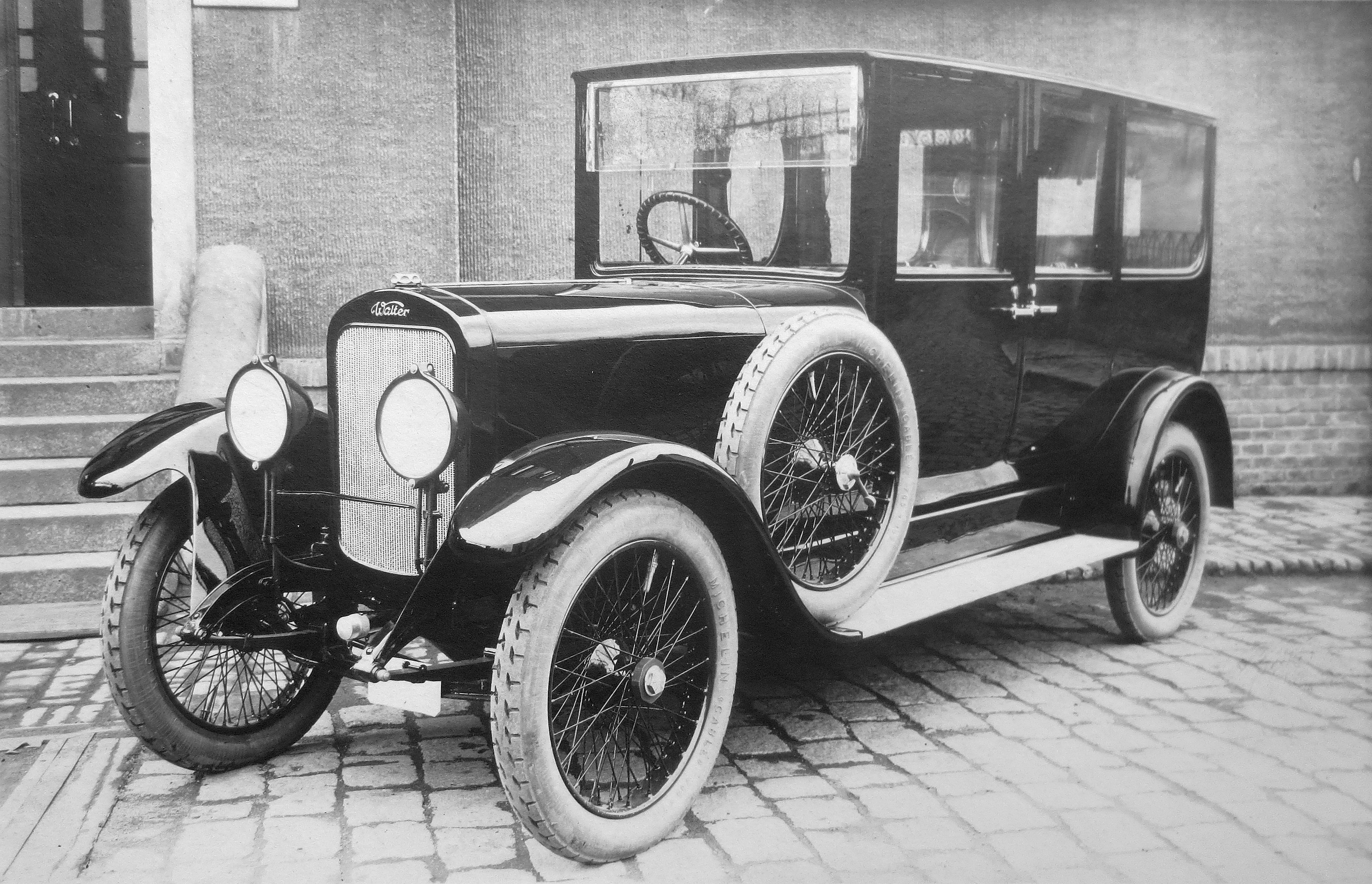
Walter WZ limousine (1920)

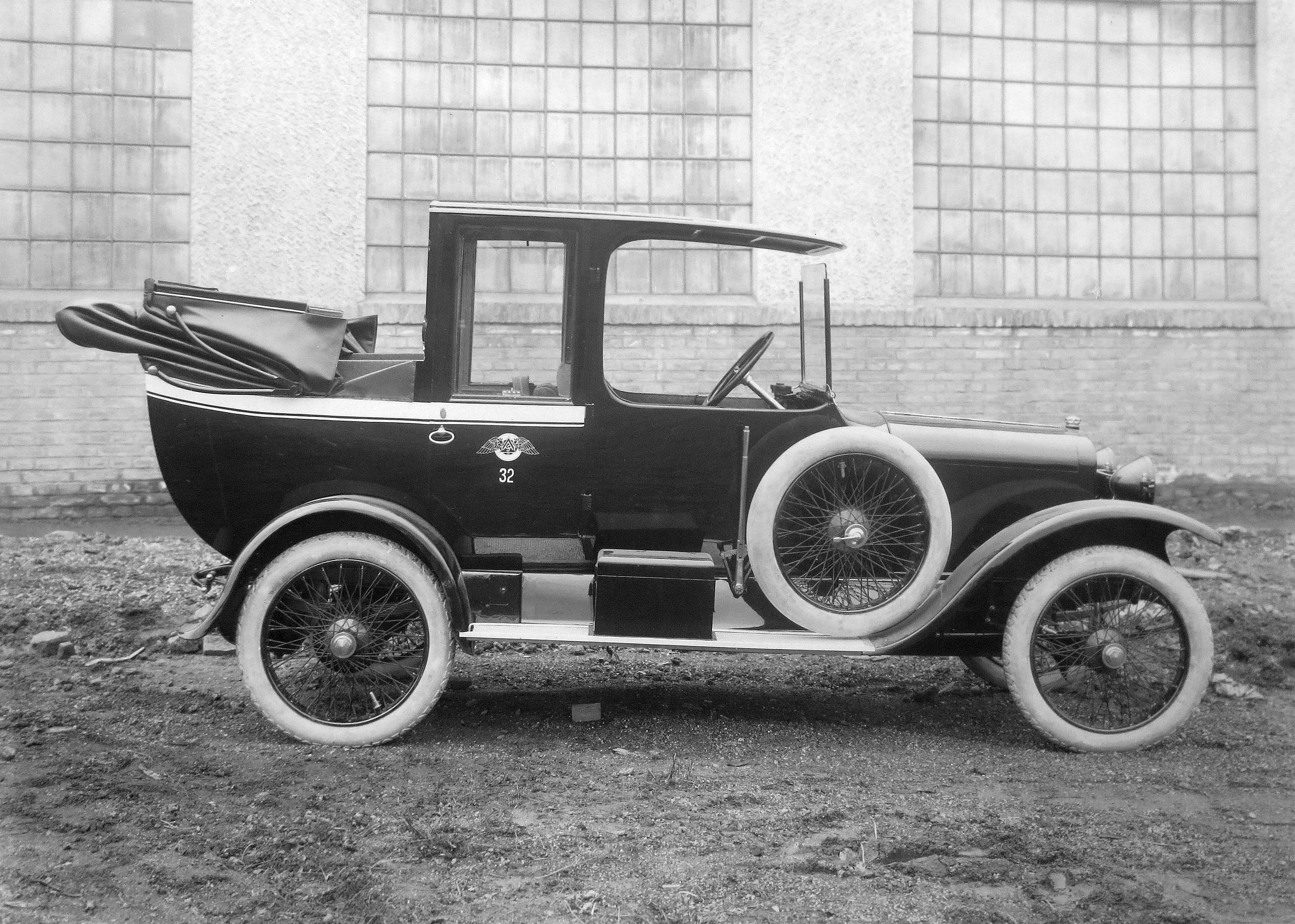
Walter WZ taxi (1921)

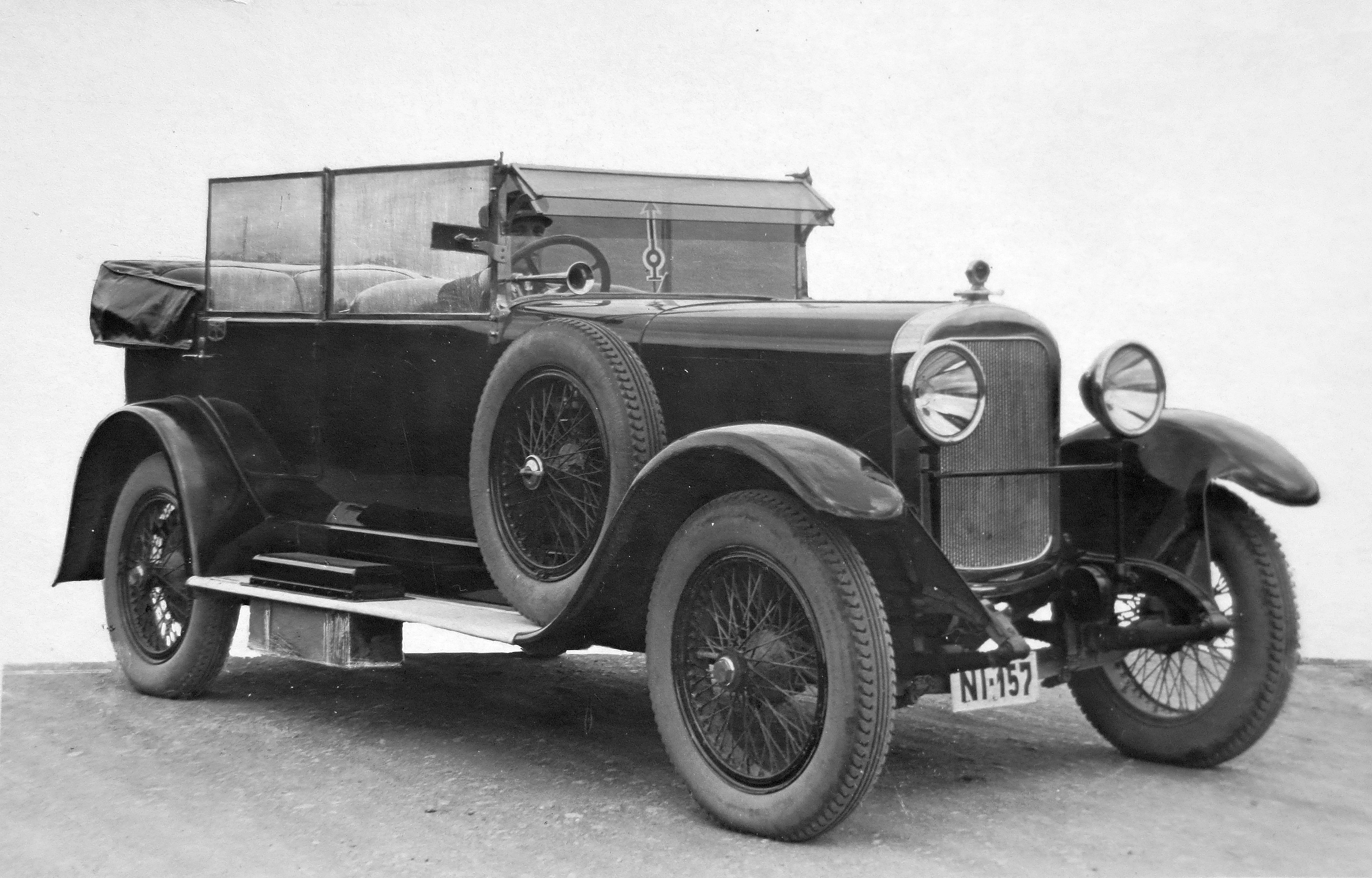
Walter P-II touring (1925)

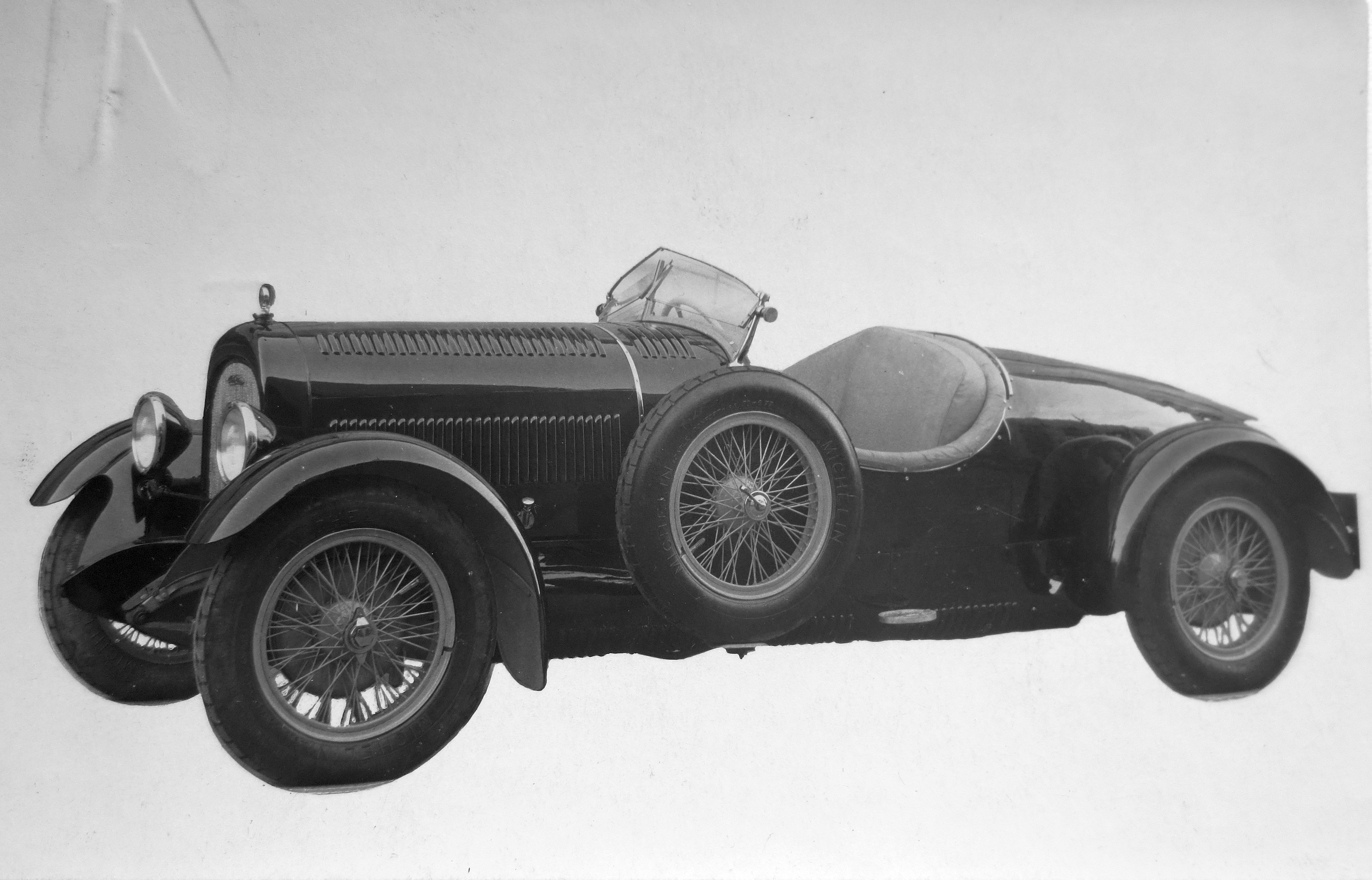
Walter P-III Super Sport (1927)

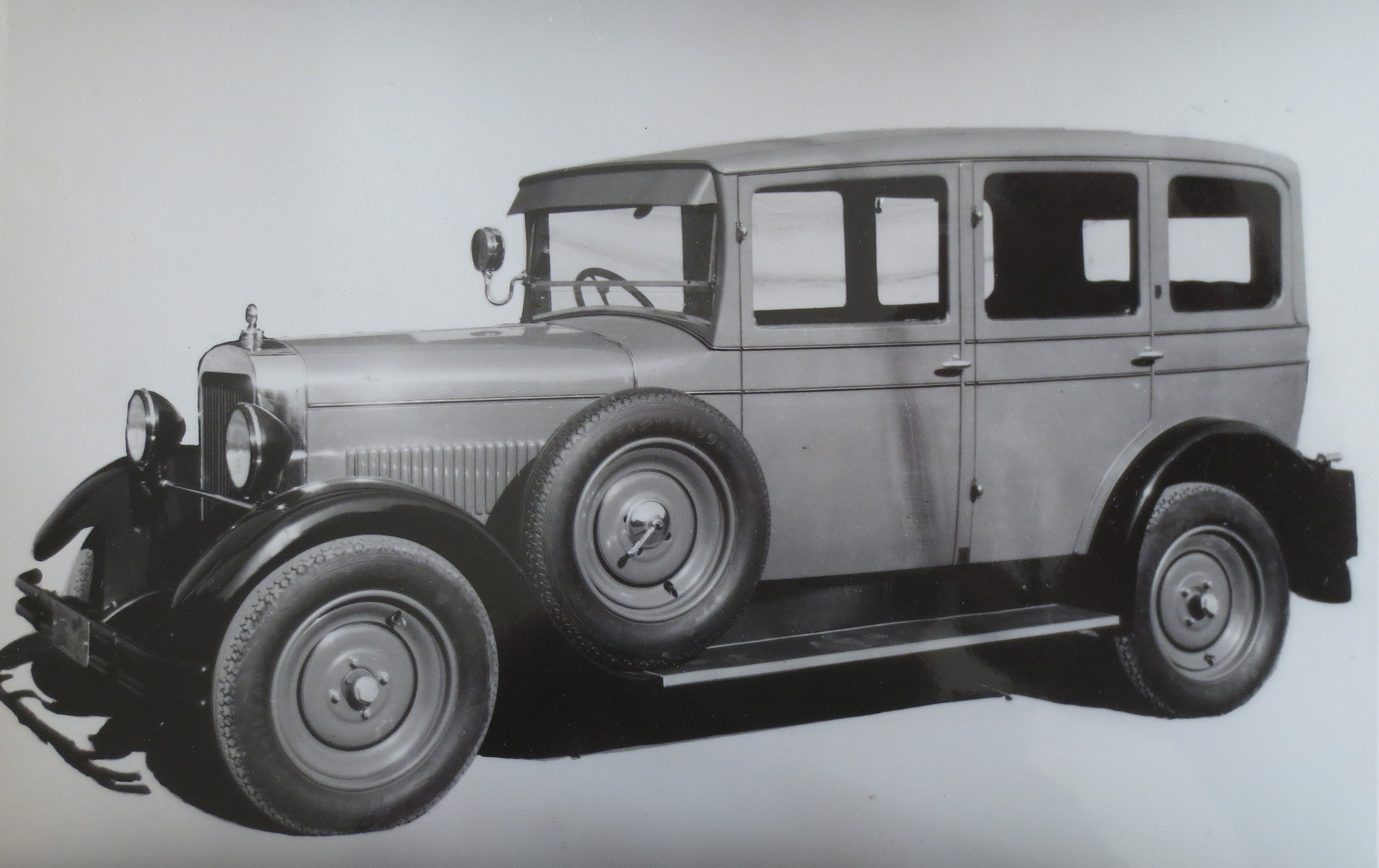
Walter 4 B sedan (1929)

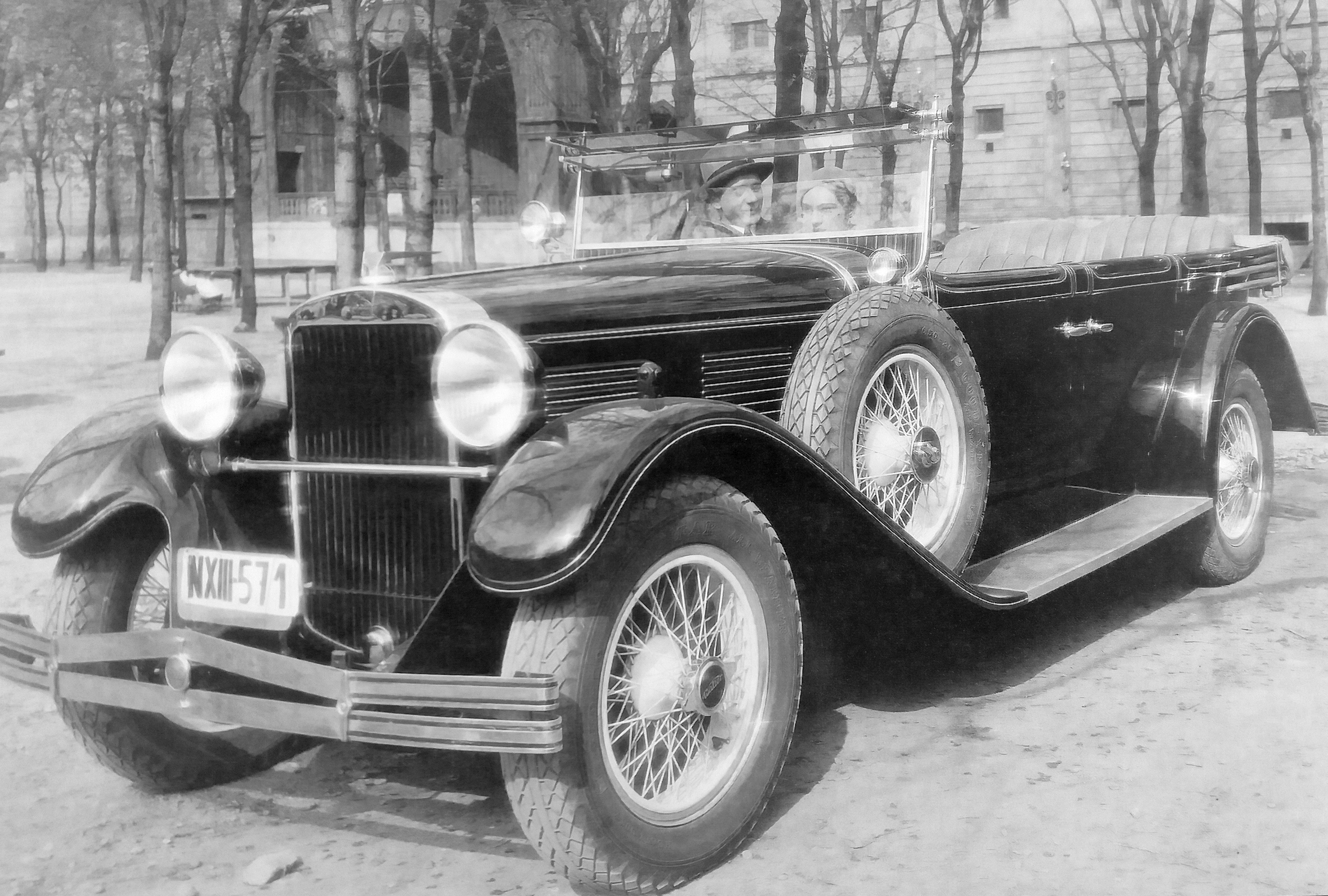
Walter 6 B touring (1929)

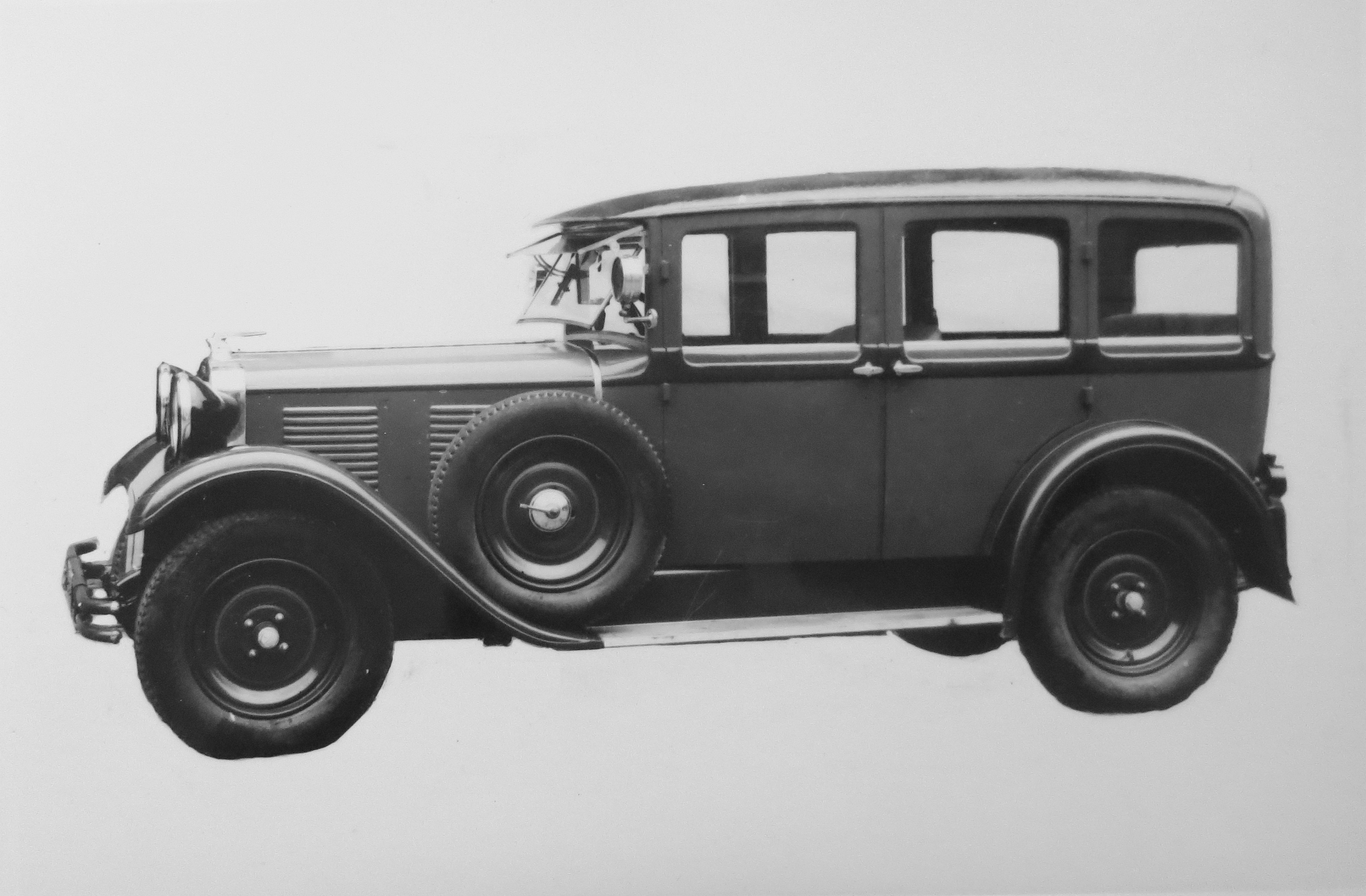
Walter Standard 6 limousine (1930)

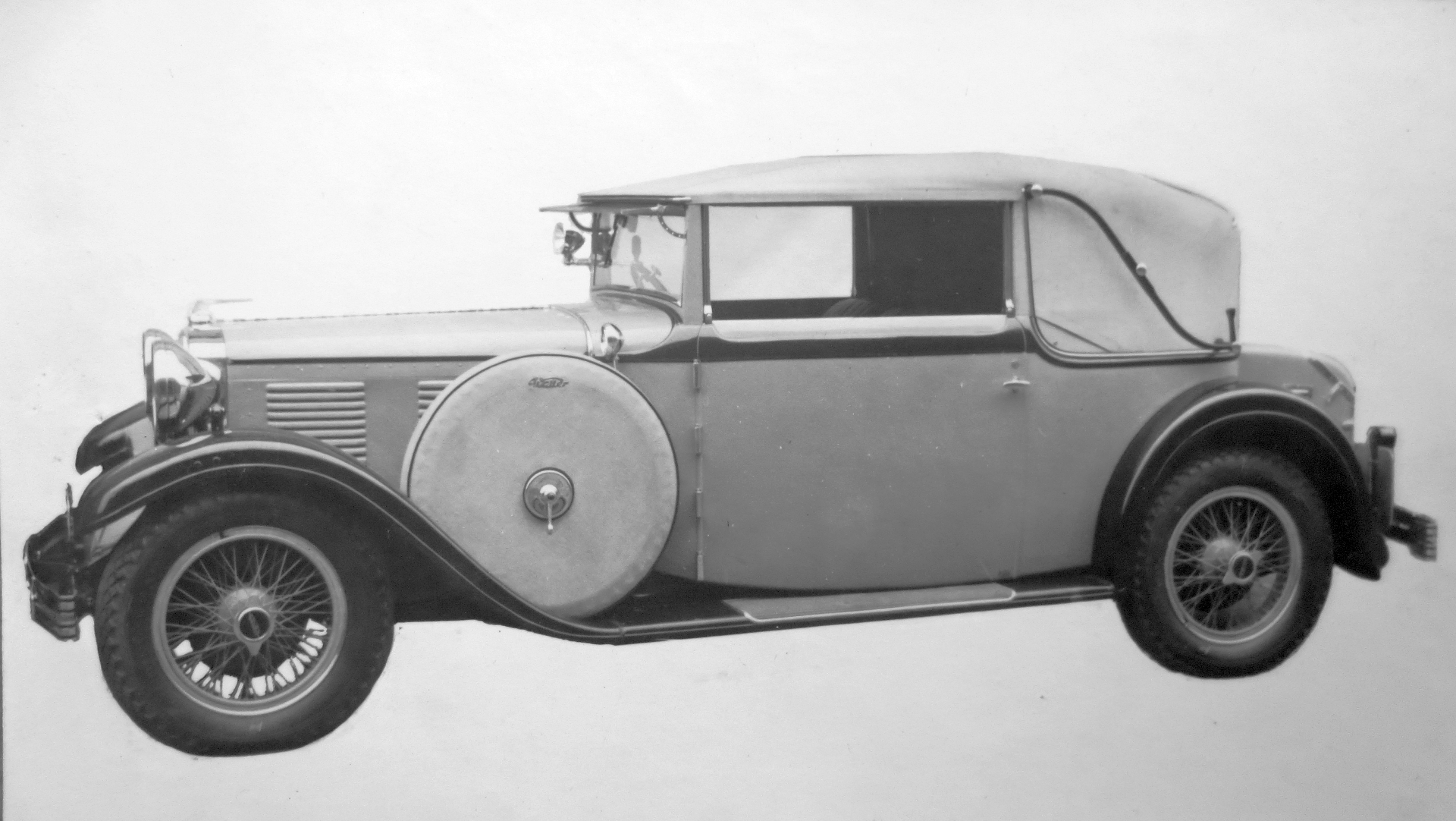
Walter Super 6 cabriolet Brožík (1931)

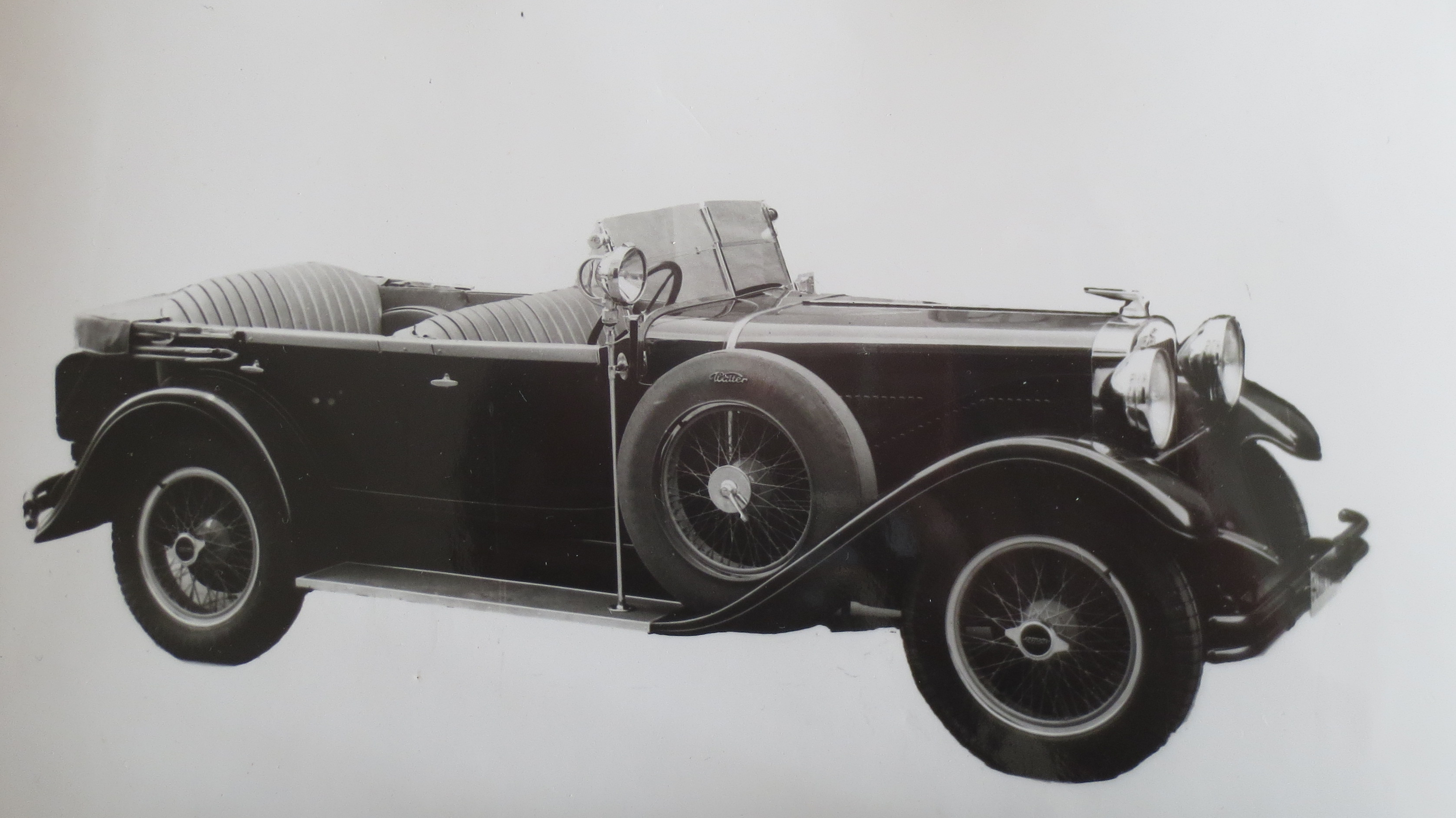
Walter Super 6 touring (1931)

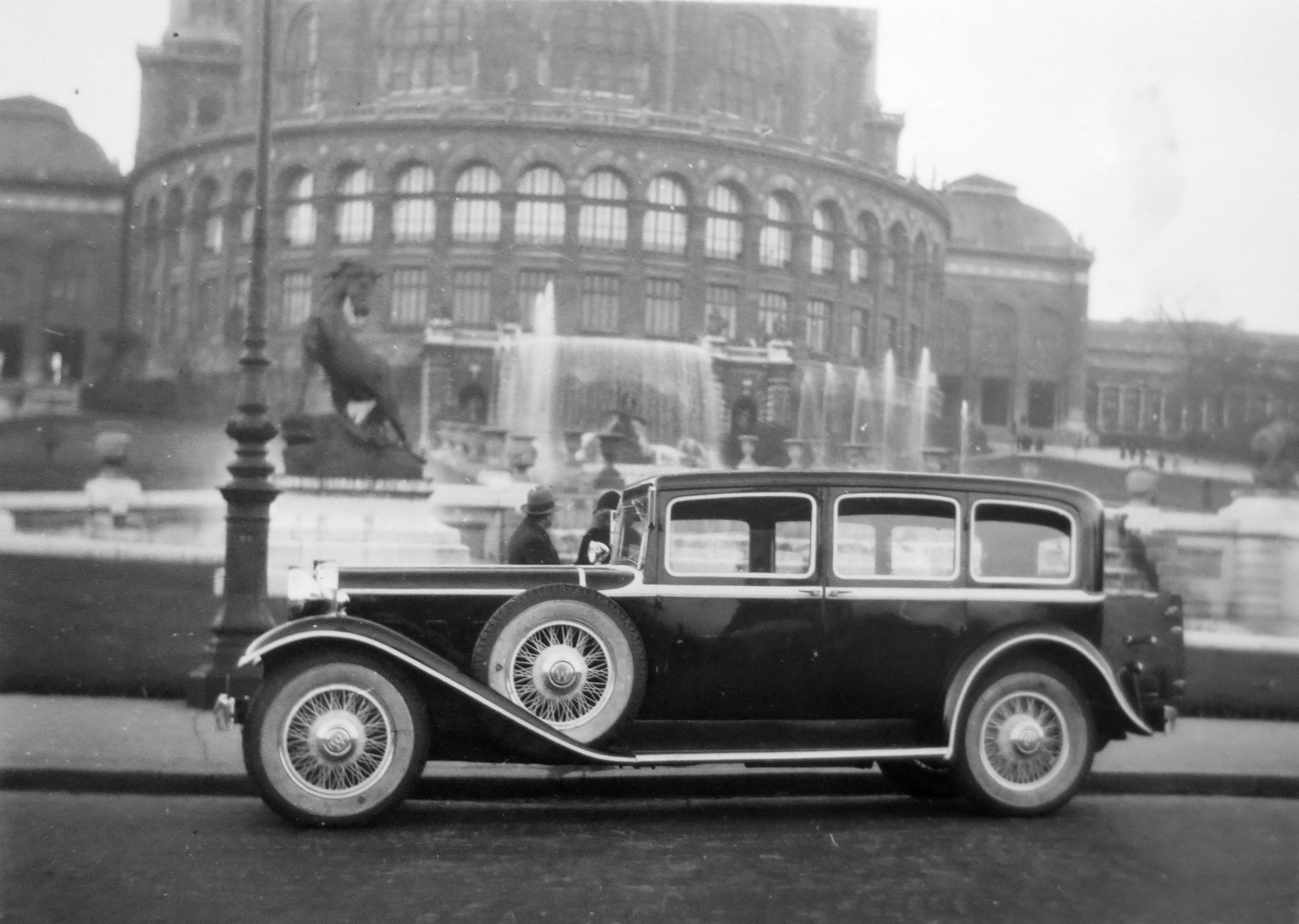
Walter Royal limousine before Trocadero in Paris (1931)

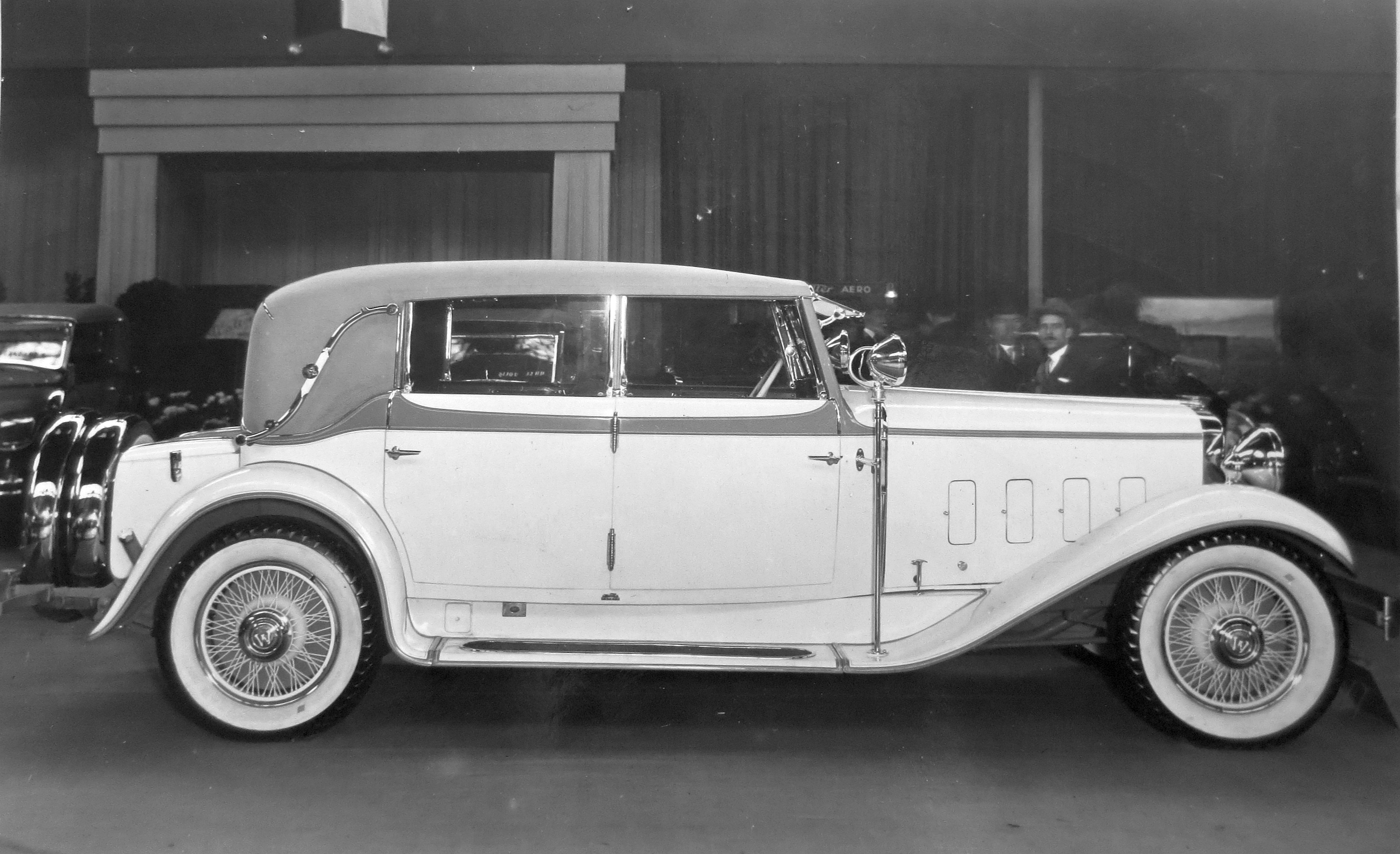
Walter Royal cabriolet Petera (1931)

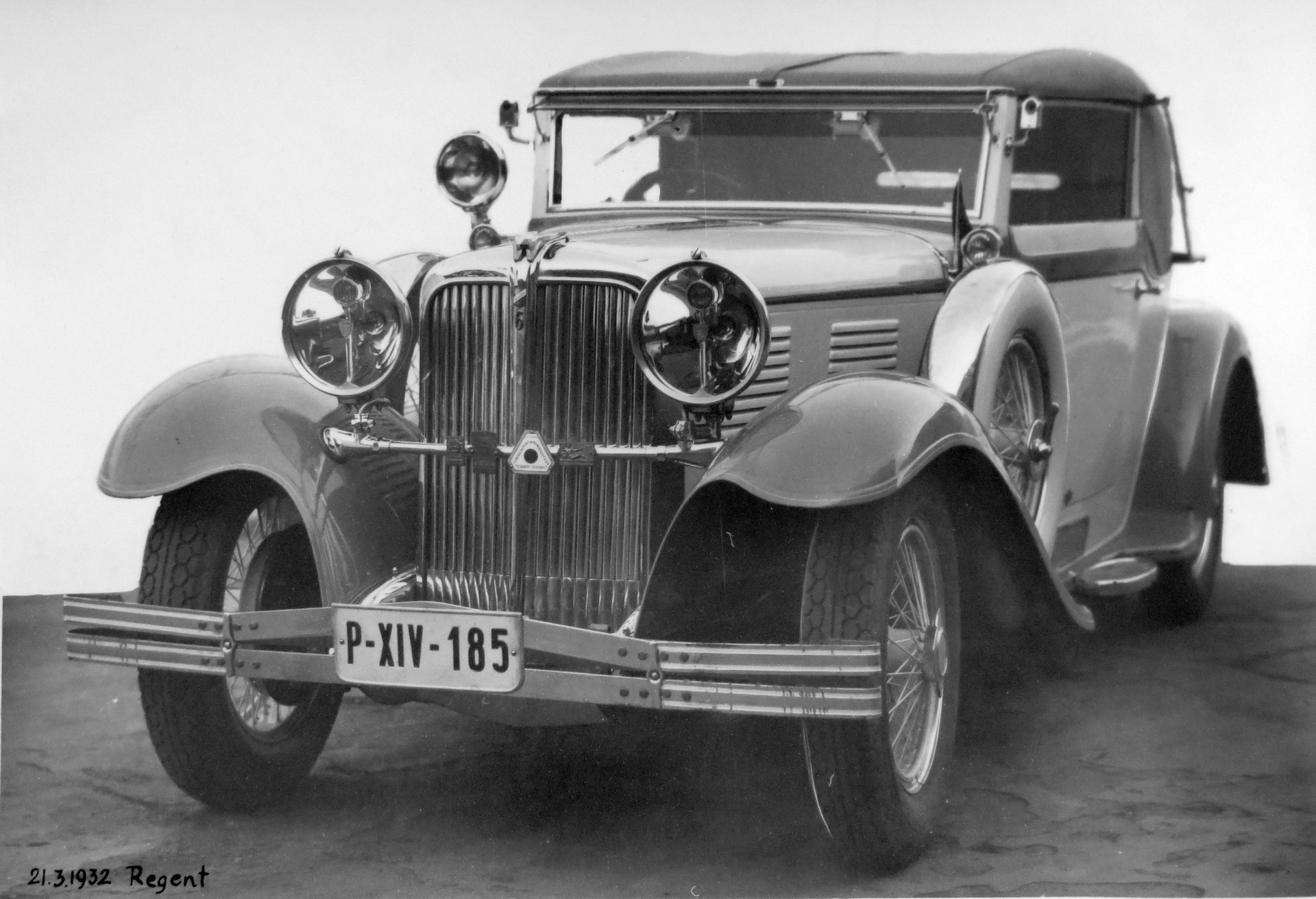
Walter Regent cabriolet (1932)

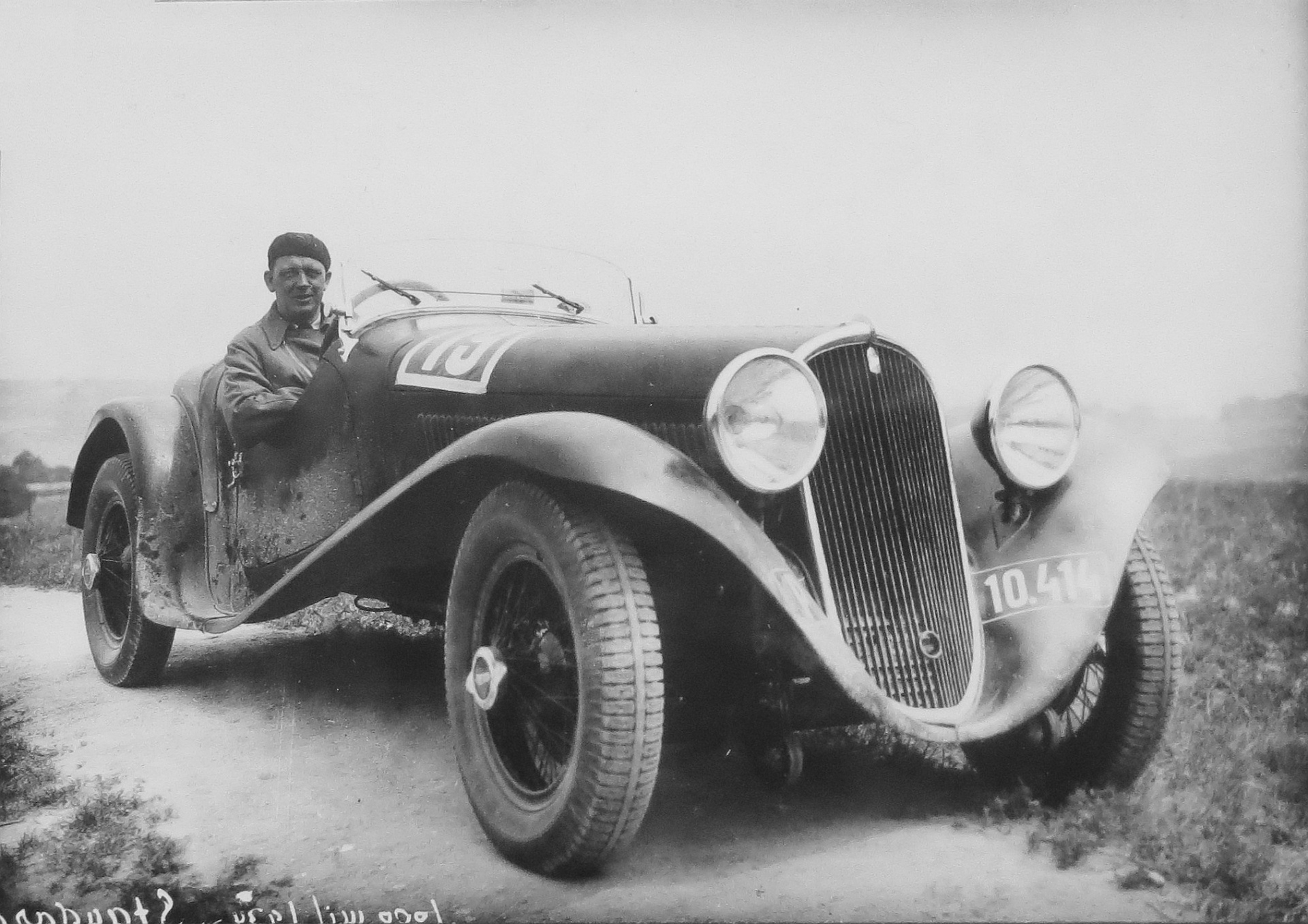
Walter Standard S, winner of the Race 1000 Miles of Czechoslovakia (1934)

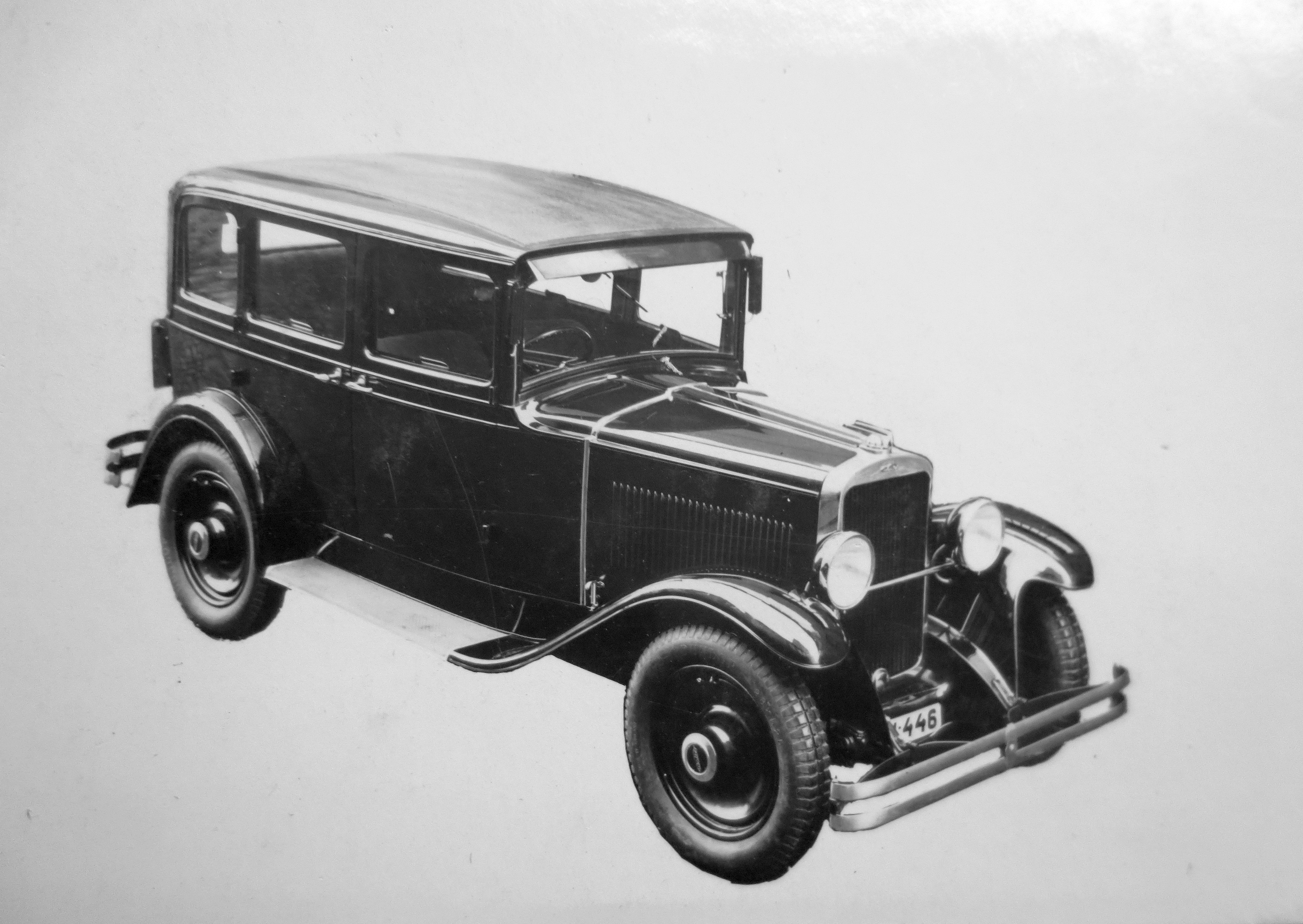
Walter Bijou sedan – Fiat 508 (1931)

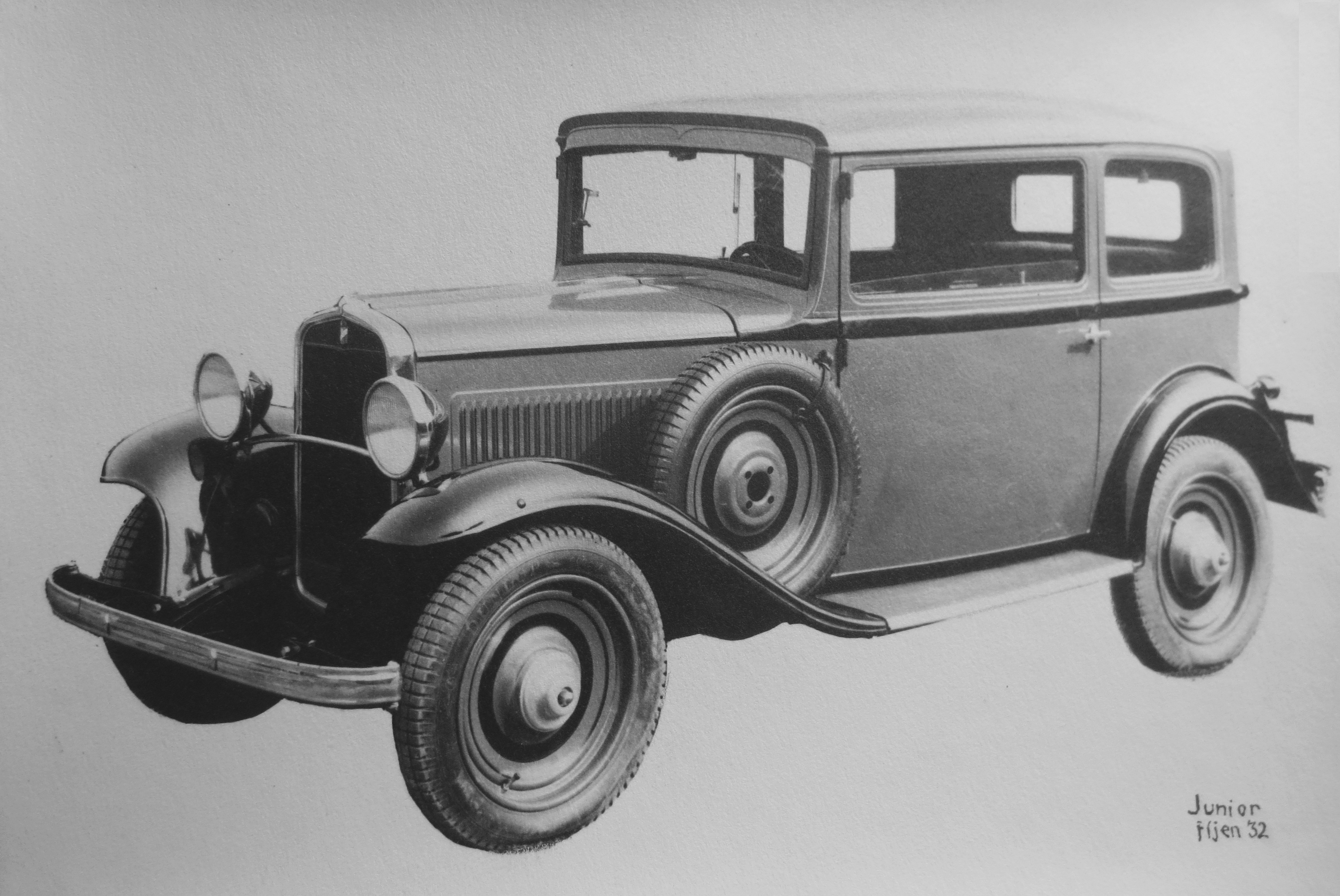
Walter Junior sedan – Fiat 514 (1932)

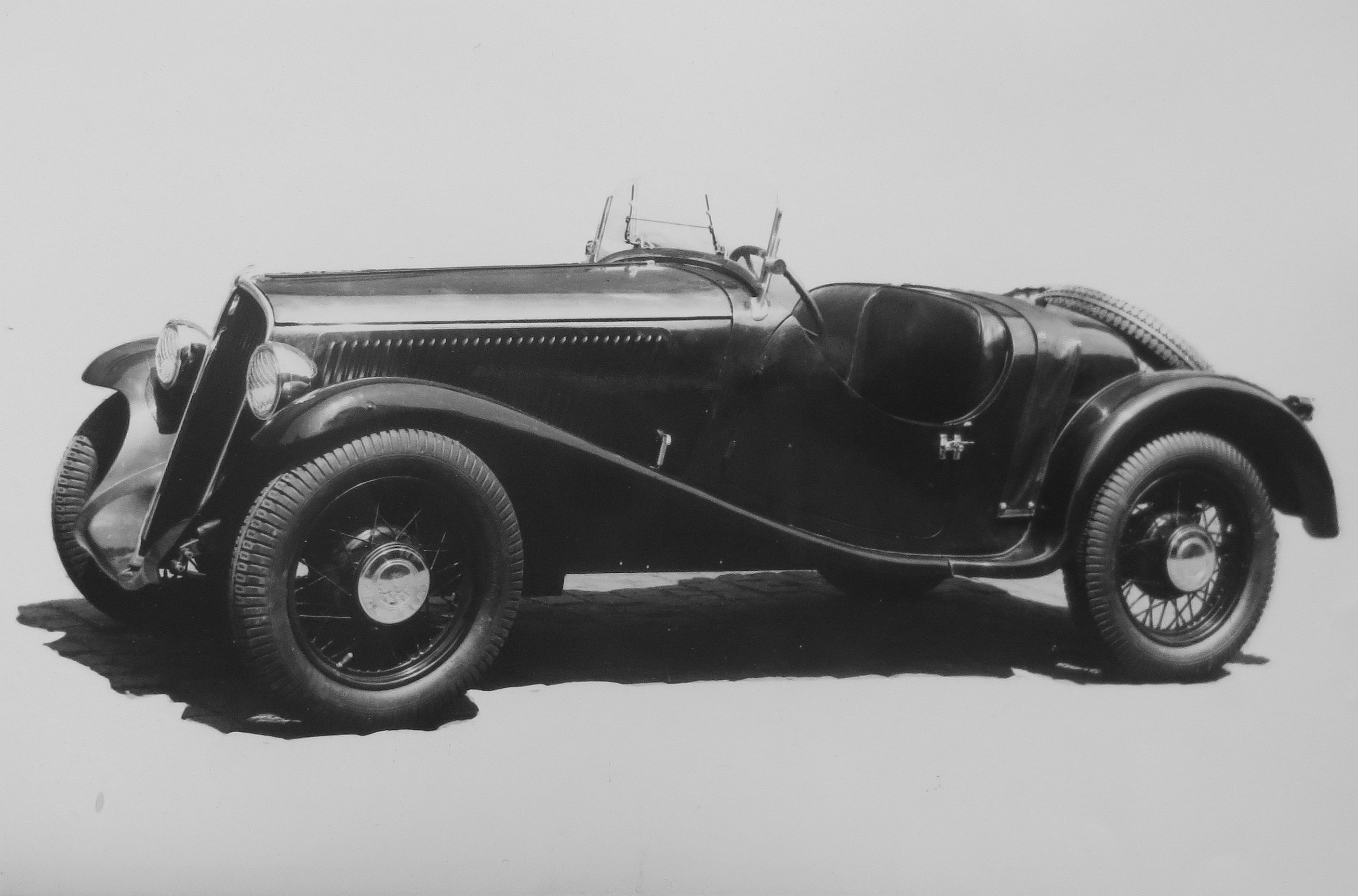
Walter Junior SS roadster – Fiat 514 Ballila Sport (1934)

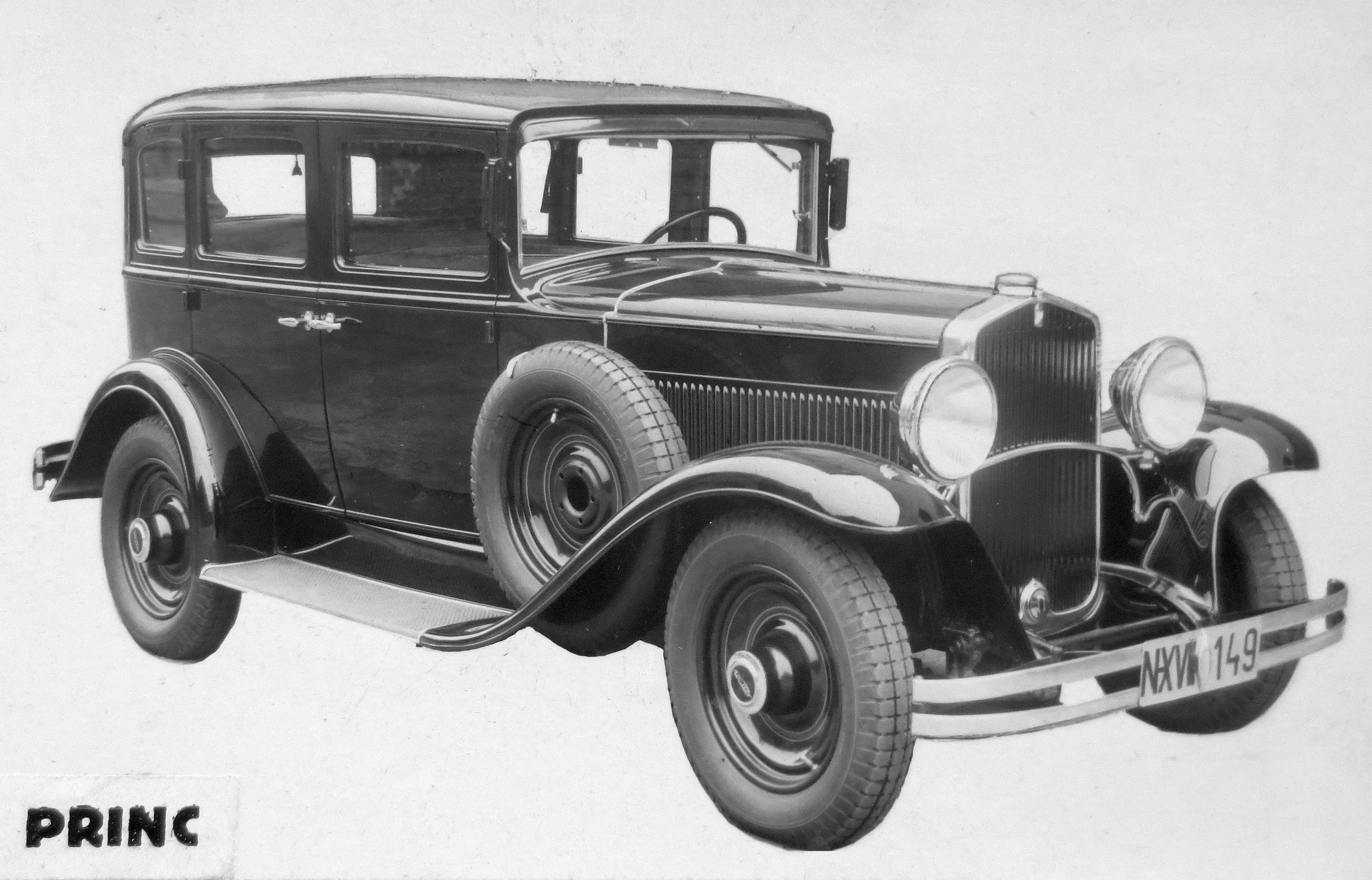
Walter Princ sedan – Fiat 522 (1934)

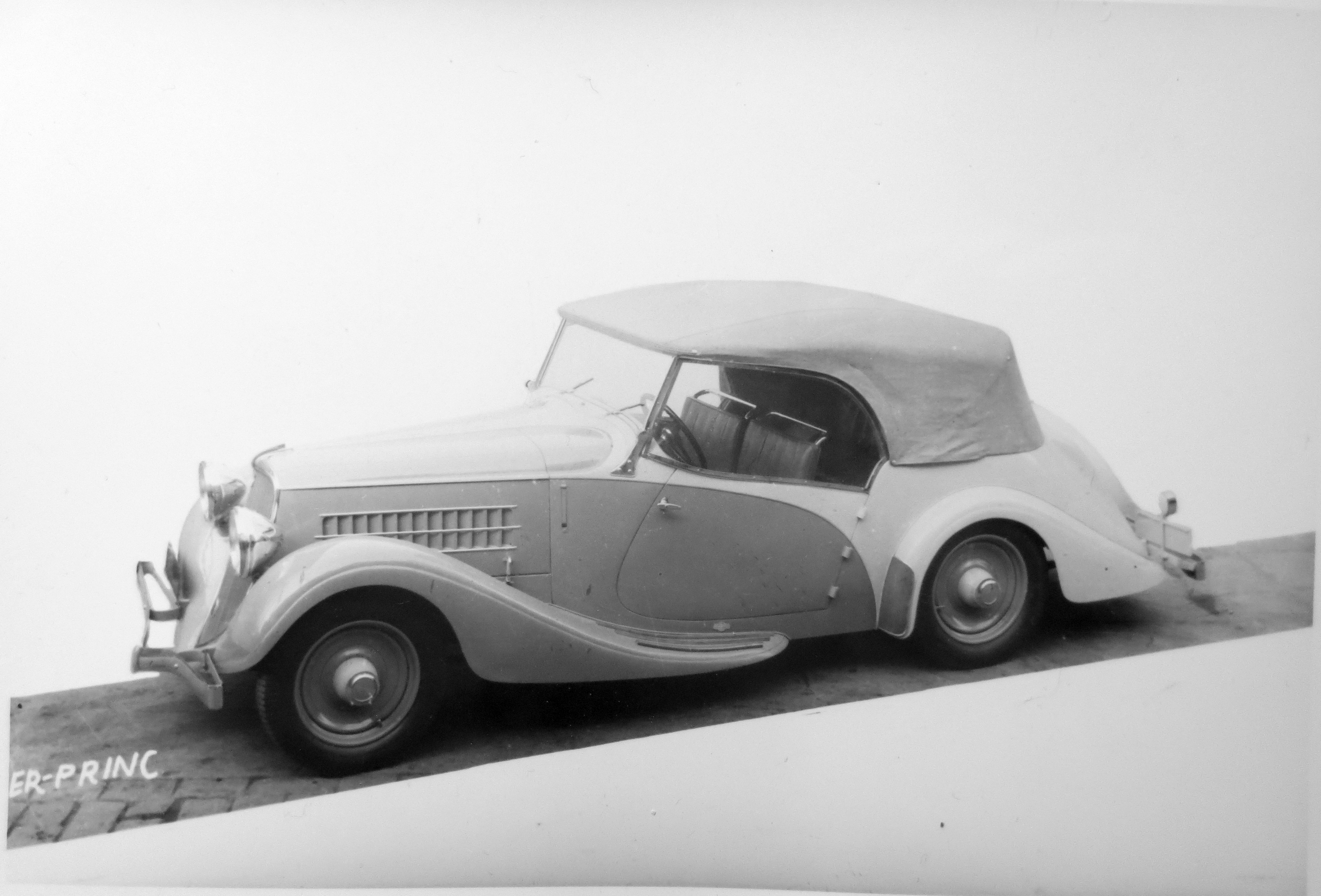
Walter Princ roadster – Fiat 522 (1934)

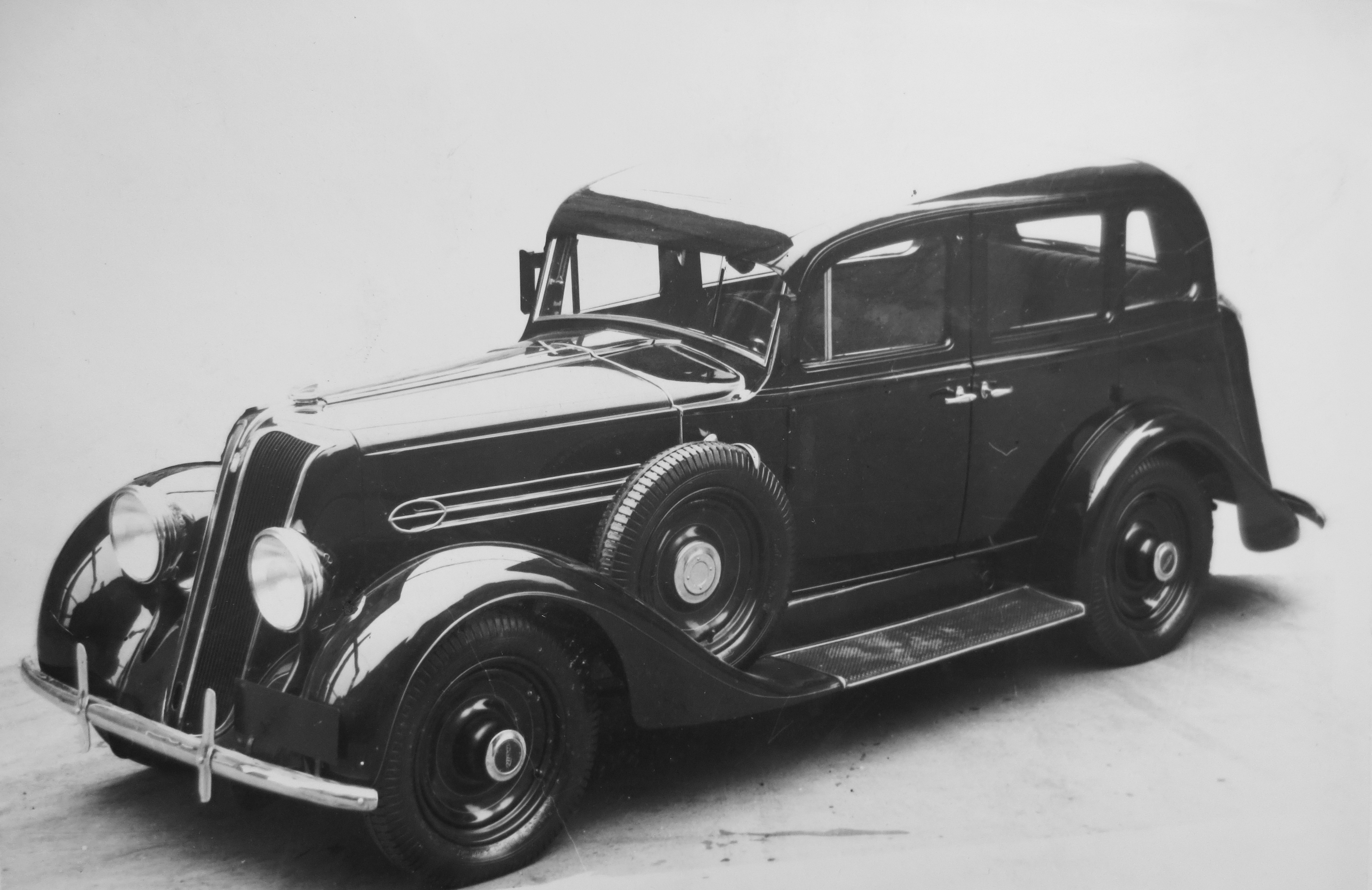
Walter Lord limousine – Fiat 522C (1936)

== Production ==
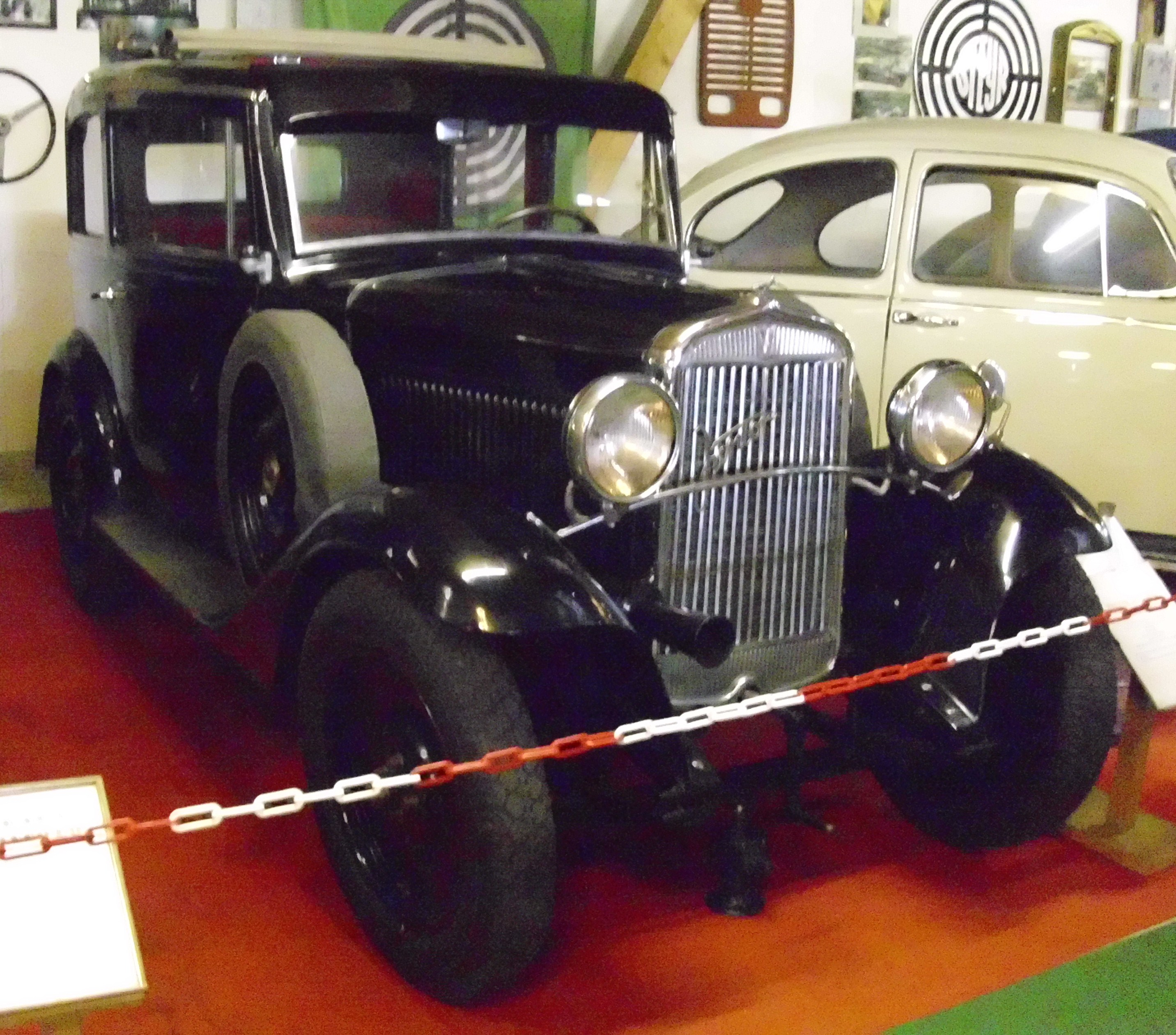
Walter Junior sedan - Fiat 508 Balilla Berlina(1932)

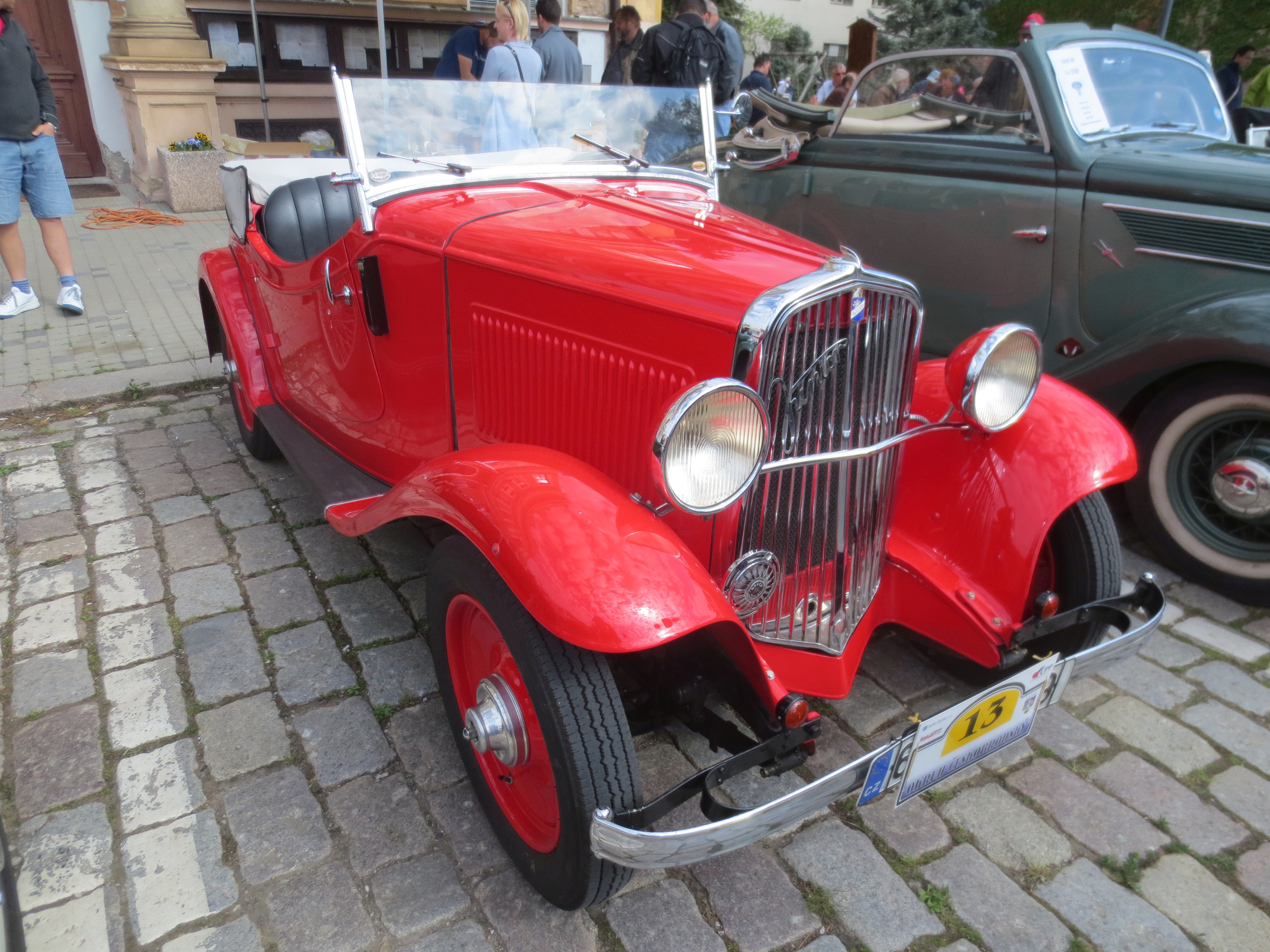
Walter Junior roadster - Fiat 508 Balilla Spider(1933)

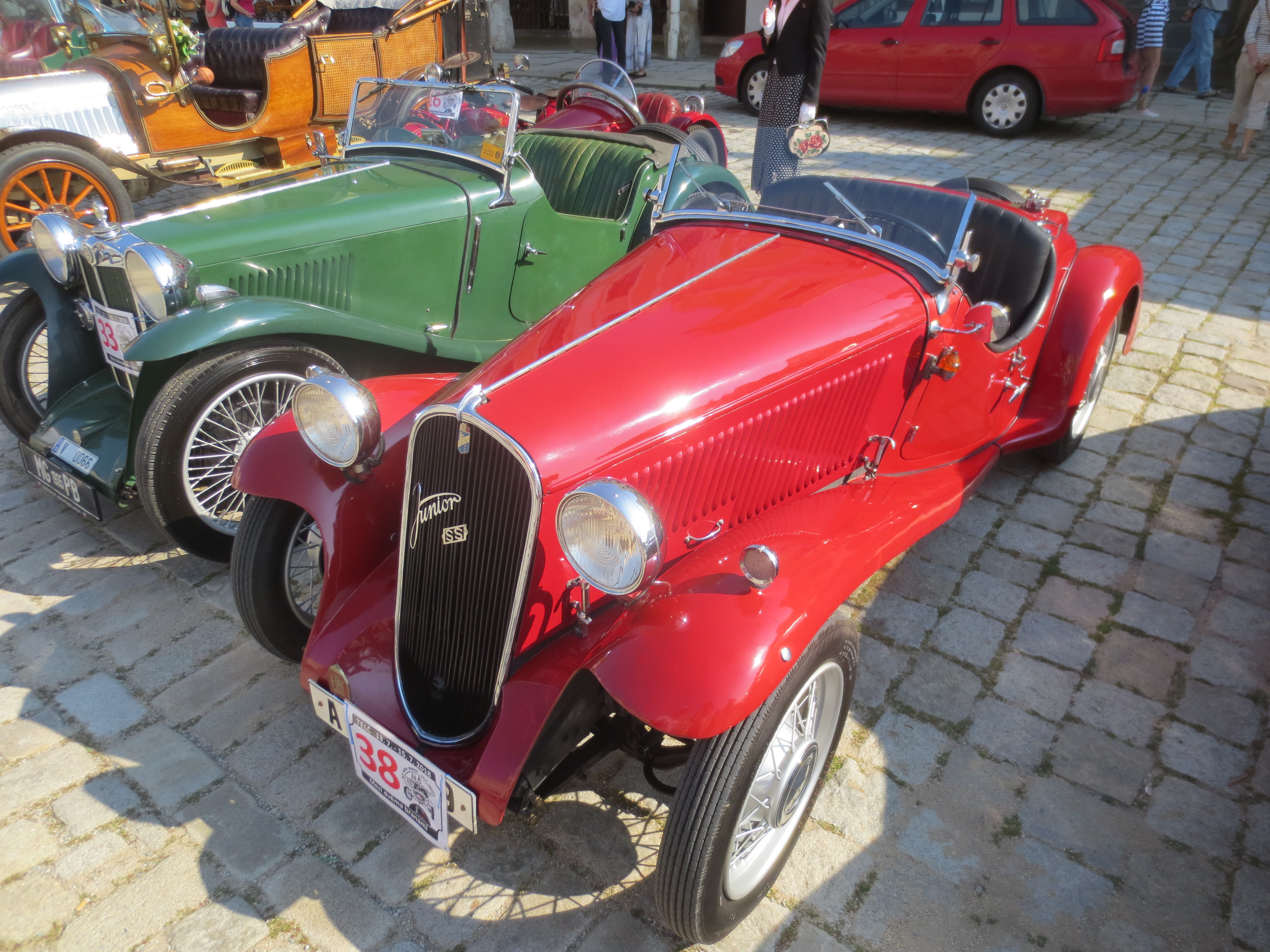
Walter Junior SS roadster - Fiat 508 Balilla Spider Sport (1935)

=== Walter cars ===
Model	Year	Engine	Displacement (cm³)	Power	Wheelbase (mm)
W-III	1913	4R SV	2.600	26 HP	2.600
W-II	1913	4R SV	1.840	20 HP	2.570
W-I	1913	4R SV	1.240	14 HP	2.560
WZ	1919	4R SV	1.540	18 HP	2.760
WIZ	1920	4R OHV	1.540	20 HP	2.760
WIZI	1922	4R SV	2.120	25 HP	2.825
P-I	1924	4R OHV	1.540	20 HP	n.c.
P-II	1924	4R OHV	1.945	25 HP	n.c.
P-III	1925	4R OHV	1.945	30 HP	3.100
P-IV	1928	4R OHV	2.300	35 HP	3.100
4-B	1928	4R OHV	1.908	35 HP	2.800
6-B	1928	6R OHV	2.860	60 HP	3.300
Standard	1930	6R OHV	2.500	65 HP	3.300
Super	1931	6R OHV	3.257	70 HP	3.600
Regent	1931	6R OHV	3.257	80 HP	3.600
Royal	1931	12V OHV	5.874	120 HP	3.700

=== Walter under Fiat Licence ===
Model	Year	Engine	Displacement (cm³)	Power	Wheelbase (mm)	Variant of
Bijou	1931	4 SV	1.438	32 HP	2.555	Fiat 514
Junior	1932	4 SV	995	22 HP	2.250	Fiat 508
Junior S	1933	4 SV	995	30 HP	2.250	Fiat 508 Ballila
Junior SS	1933/34	4 OHV	995	35 HP	2.250	Fiat 508
Princ	1933	6 SV	2.491	60 HP	2.775	Fiat 522
Lord	1933	6 SV	2.491	60 HP	2.875	Fiat 522C

== Sources ==
- Tuček, Jan (2017). Auta první republiky 1918–1938 (in Czech). Prague: Grada Publishing. ISBN 978-80-271-0466-6.
