= Walters =

Walters may refer to:

== Places ==
United States

- Walters, Minnesota, a city
- Walters, Oklahoma, a city
- Walters, Virginia, an unincorporated community

== Other uses ==
- Walters (surname)
- Walters (character), a character on Tale Spin
- The Walters, an alternative rock band from Chicago, Illinois
- Walters Art Museum, often referred to as "The Walters", a major art museum in Baltimore

== See also ==
- Walter (disambiguation)
- Justice Walters (disambiguation)
- Walter's Hot Dog Stand
