= Walter =

Walter may refer to:

== People and fictional characters ==
- Walter (name), including a list of people and fictional and mythical characters with the given name or surname
- Little Walter, American blues harmonica player Marion Walter Jacobs (1930–1968)
- Gunther (wrestler), Austrian professional wrestler and trainer Walter Hahn (born 1987), who previously wrestled as "Walter"
- Walter, standard author abbreviation for Thomas Walter (botanist) (c. 1740 – 1789)
- "Agent Walter", an early codename of Josip Broz Tito
- Walter, pseudonym of the anonymous writer of My Secret Life
- Walter Plinge, British theatre pseudonym used when the original actor's name is unknown or not wished to be included
- Walter Fernández, Spanish professional footballer who plays for CE Manresa mainly as an attacking midfielder

== Companies ==
- American Chocolate, later called Walter, an American automobile manufactured from 1902 to 1906
- Walter Energy, a metallurgical coal producer for the global steel industry
- Walter Aircraft Engines, Czech manufacturer of aero-engines
- Walter (automobiles), former Czech manufacturer of automobiles

== Film and television ==
- Walter (1982 film), a British television drama film
- Walter (2014 film), a British television crime drama
- Walter (2015 film), an American comedy-drama film
- Walter (2020 film), an Indian crime drama film
- W*A*L*T*E*R, a 1984 pilot for a spin-off of the TV series M*A*S*H
- Walter and Tandoori (original title Walter), a Canadian animated television series

== Places ==
- Walter, Alabama, United States
- Walter Township, Minnesota, United States

== Other uses ==
- Walter (crater), on the Moon, more commonly known as Diophantus
- Walter (Lapinot), a comic strip by French cartoonist Lewis Trondheim
- Walter the Whale, an early star captive orca (killer whale) in 1967

== See also ==
- List of storms named Walt
- Walters (disambiguation)
- Walters (surname)
- Walther (disambiguation)
- Wolter, a given name and surname
