= Walters (surname) =

Walters is a surname of English origin. It used to denote "Son of Walter", derived from the given name Walter, which was introduced into England and Wales about the time of the Norman Conquest. The name "Walter" originates from the Old German wald ("rule") + heri ("warrior").

Notable people with the surname include:

- Addi Walters (born 1996), American basketball coach
- Alan Walters (1926–2009), British economist, Chief Economic Adviser to Margaret Thatcher
- Allan Walters (1905–1968), Australian air force officer
- Amy Walters, American television producer
- Andrew Walters (disambiguation), several persons
- Anne-Marie Walters (1923–1998), British spy during World War II
- Arthur Melmoth Walters (1865–1941), English footballer
- Barbara Walters (1929–2022), American broadcast journalist, author, and television personality
- Bill Walters (Arkansas politician) (1943–2013), American lawyer, businessman, and politician
- Bree Walters (born 1976), Australian actress
- Brian Walters (born 1954), Australian barrister and human rights advocate
- Bryan Walters (born 1987), American football wide receiver
- Bruce Walters (born 1954), American artist
- Bucky Walters (1909–1991), American baseball player
- Catherine Walters (1839–1920), English fashion trendsetter and courtesan
- Charles Walters (1911–1982), Hollywood director and choreographer
- Charles Walters, Jr. (1926–2009), United States economist, publisher, editor, and author
- Chester Samuel Walters (1878–1958), Canadian politician and administrator
- Cyril Walters (1905–1992), Welsh cricketer
- Dan Walters (1966–2020), American baseball player and police officer
- David Walters (born 1951), governor of Oklahoma
- Dennis Walters (1928–2021), British politician
- Doug Walters (born 1928), Australian cricketer
- Eric Walters (born 1957), Canadian author of teenagers' literature
- Eric Walters (newsreader) (1937–2010), Australian journalist news anchor
- Frank Walters (1860–1922), Australian cricketer
- George Walters (disambiguation), several persons
- Gordon Walters (1919–1995), New Zealand artist and graphic designer
- Guy Walters (born 1971), British author and journalist
- Hannes Walter (born 1984), German politician
- Harry N. Walters (1936–2019), American businessman and administrator
- Henry Walters (1848–1931), American rail magnate and art collector
- Henry Walters (cricketer) (1917–1944), New Zealand cricketer
- Henry Walters (footballer) (1925–1994), English footballer
- Henry Walters (public servant) (1868–1929), Australian public servant
- Herbert S. Walters (1891–1973), United States senator for Tennessee
- Hugh Walters (actor) (1939–2015), British actor
- Hugh Walters (author) (1910–1993), British author of children's fiction
- Hyacinth Walters (born 1926), Jamaican track and field athlete
- Ian Walters (1930–2006), English sculptor
- J. Henry Walters (1874–1952), American lawyer and state politician from New York
- James Walters (British actor), actor in the Harry Potter films
- Jamie Walters (American entertainer) (born 1969), actor, singer, firefighter and record producer
- Jason Walters (born 1985), Dutch Islamist extremist
- Joan Walters (1924–2011), American professor
- Joe Walters (born 1984), American lacrosse player
- John Walters (disambiguation), several persons
- Jonathan Walters (born 1983), Irish footballer
- Judith R. Walters, American neuropharmacologist
- Julie Walters (born 1950), British actress
- Kerrod Walters (born 1967), Australian rugby league player
- Kerry S. Walters (born 1954), American philosopher and Christian writer
- Kevin Walters (born 1967), Australian rugby league player
- Larry Walters (1949–1993), American balloon aviator
- LeRoy Walters (born 1940), American philosopher
- Mark Walters (born 1964), English football player
- Martin Walters (born 1985), South African cricketer
- Mary Coon Walters (1922–2001), American judge
- Matt Walters (born 1979), American football player
- Max Walters (1920–2005, Stuart Max Walters), British botanist and academic
- Melanie Walters (born 1962), Welsh actress
- Melora Walters (born 1960), American actress
- Michael Walters (born 1991), Australian footballer
- Mimi Walters (born 1962), American state senator for California
- Minette Walters (born 1949), British crime writer
- Nancy Walters (1933–2009), American model, actress, and minister
- Naomi Walters, fictional character from the British soap opera Emmerdale
- Nathaniel Walters (1875–1956), Welsh international rugby player
- Paul Walters (1947–2006), British radio and TV producer for the BBC
- Percy Melmoth Walters (1863–1936), English footballer
- Peter Walters (1931–2023), British businessman
- Peter Walters (footballer) (born 1952), English footballer
- Ratus Walters, former NASCAR Cup Series team owner
- Rex Walters (born 1970), American basketball player and coach
- Riaan Walters (born 1980), Namibian cricketer
- R. C. S. Walters (1888–1980), English civil engineer
- Richard Walters, also known as Slick Rick (born 1965), English-American musician and actor
- Rita Walters (1930–2020), American politician
- Rochelle Walters (born 2000), English karateka
- Ron Walters (1938–2010), Author and scholar
- Ron Walters (ice hockey) (born 1948), Canadian ice hockey player
- Ron Walters (luger) (born 1943), American luger
- Ron Walters (make-up artist) (1938–1994), American make-up artist
- Ron Walters (politician) (born 1950), American politician
- Scot Walters (born 1967), American race car driver
- Shirley Walters (1925–2017), Australian senator for Tasmania
- Shirley A. Walters (born 1948), American politician
- Shu-Aib Walters (born 1981), South African football player
- Silas Walters (born 2002), American football player
- Sonny Walters (1924–1970), English footballer
- Stan Walters (born 1948), American football player
- Stephen Walters (born 1975), British actor
- Steve Walters (born 1965), Australian rugby league player
- Steve Walters (footballer) (born 1972), English footballer
- Susan Walters (born 1963), American actress
- Thorley Walters (1913–1991), English character-actor
- Tome H. Walters Jr., American military officer
- Tom Walters (association footballer) (1909–1968), Welsh footballer
- Tony Walters, Australian actor and film director
- Trevor Walters (bishop), British-born Canadian bishop of the Anglican Network in Canada
- Trevor Walters (footballer) (1916–1989), English footballer
- Trevor Walters (singer) (born 1961), British reggae singer
- Troy Walters (born 1976), American football player
- Vanessa Walters (born 1978), English novelist and playwright
- Vernon A. Walters (1917–2002), United States Army officer and diplomat
- Victor Walters, English footballer
- Wes Walters (1928–2014), Australian artist
- William Thompson Walters (1820–1894), American businessman and art collector

== See also ==
- Walter (disambiguation)
