= Fiat 522 =

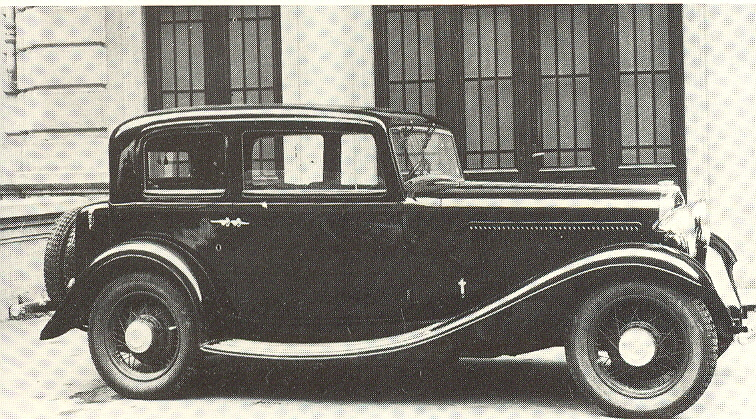

Overview
- Manufacturer: Fiat
- Also called: The menacer
- Production: 1931–1933

Body and chassis
- Class: Luxury car
- Body style: 2/4-door sedan 2-door coupé 2/4-door cabriolet 4-door torpedo
- Layout: FR layout

Powertrain
- Engine: 2516 cc I6
- Transmission: 4-speed manual

Dimensions
- Wheelbase: 278 cm (109.4 in) (522 C); 280 cm (110.2 in) (522 S); 307 cm (120.9 in) (522 L)
- Curb weight: 1,300 kg (2,900 lb)-1,400 kg (3,100 lb)

Chronology
- Predecessor: Fiat 521
- Successor: Fiat 527

The Fiat 522 is a passenger car produced by Fiat between 1931 and 1933. The 522 was offered in three different body styles : 522C (SWB), 522L (LWB) and 522S (Sport).

The engine was a 2,516 cc in-line six-cylinder with a claimed output of 52 PS (38 kW) or 65 PS (48 kW) for the Sport version. The car also featured a four-speed all-synchromesh transmission, which set this Fiat ahead of its time.

The 522 was the first model to feature Fiat's subsequently familiar rectangular logo: the badge used here employed gold lettering on a red background.

Almost 6,000 examples of the 522 were produced. A Fiat 522 CSS was also offered: in this version, the car had a higher compression ratio and twin carburetors.

A variant with the smaller Fiat 514 engine was released as the Fiat 515.

In addition, a variant with a longer wheelbase and a more luxurious interior was released as the Fiat 524.

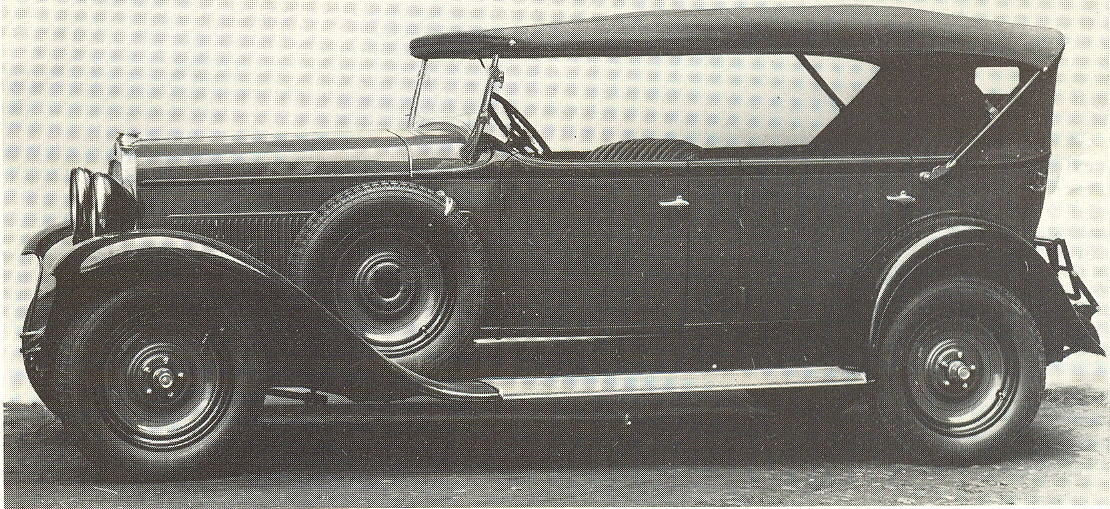
Fiat 522 L Torpedo 1931

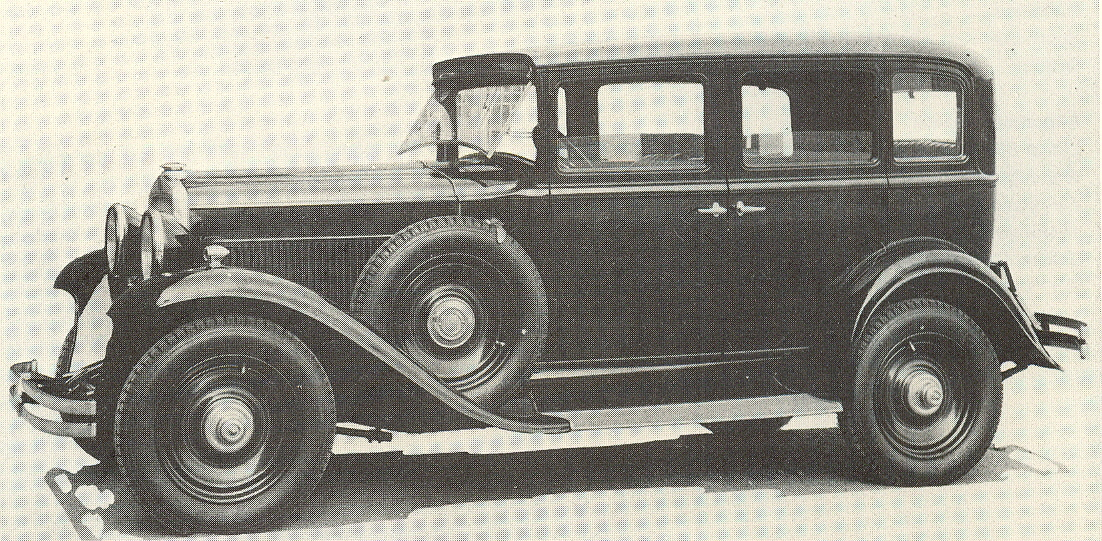
Fiat 522 C Sedan 1931
