= Andrew Waters =

Andrew Waters may refer to:

- Andy Waters, chef who worked with Andreas Antona
- Andrew Waters (mixed martial artist) in Strikeforce Challengers: Woodley vs. Bears

== See also ==
- Andrew Walters (disambiguation)
