= Fiat 515 =

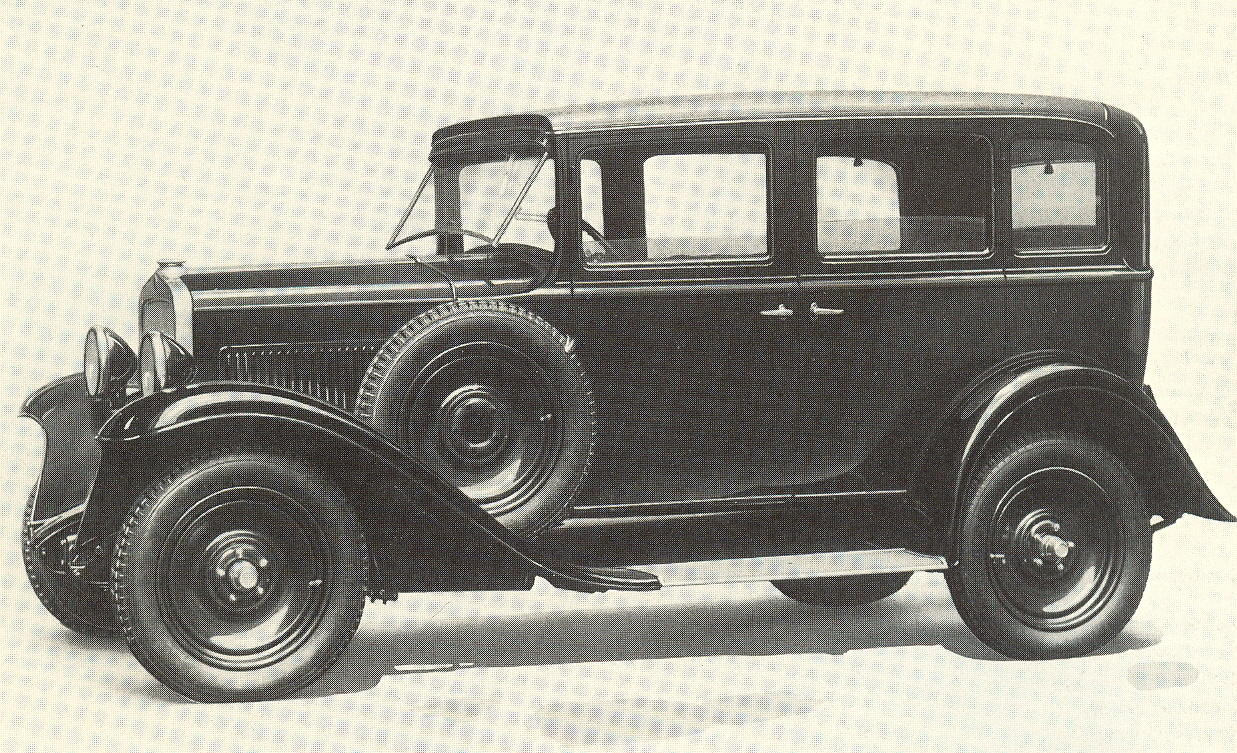

Overview
- Manufacturer: Fiat
- Production: 1931–1935

Body and chassis
- Body style: 4-door sedan 4-door landaulette
- Layout: Front-engine, rear-wheel-drive

Powertrain
- Engine: 1438 cc straight-4
- Transmission: 4-speed manual

Dimensions
- Wheelbase: 258 cm (101.6 in); 287 cm (113.0 in) (515 L)
- Curb weight: 1,150 kg (2,540 lb)

Chronology
- Predecessor: Fiat 514
- Successor: Fiat 1500

The Fiat 515 is a passenger car produced by Fiat between 1931 and 1935. The 515 is a "hybrid", with a Fiat 514 engine in the larger 522 chassis.

The car was also made in a long version as the 515 L. 3400 of this model were produced.
