= Bruce Walters =

Bruce Walters (born November 29, 1954, in Davenport, Iowa), is an artist who has exhibited digital artworks, graphite drawings and paintings primarily in the American Midwest. Walters received his MFA from the University of Wisconsin–Madison and BA from the University of Iowa. He retired from Western Illinois University in 2021 and was conferred with the title Professor Emeritus.

== Artwork ==
Walters' artwork has been included in more than one hundred solo, invitational, and competitive exhibitions. Working in collaboration with some forty musicians, technicians, scientists and artists, Walters created Exploring NASA, which was first displayed as a 100' wide projection on the exterior of the Figge Art Museum, Davenport, IA in conjunction with the Smithsonian exhibition "NASA | ART: 50 Years of Exploration" in 2012. In December 2013, Exploring NASA was displayed as multiple projections at the Iowa Historical Museum in Des Moines, IA. Multiple Exploring NASA videos and astronaut drawings were exhibited at the Moline International Airport Gallery in 2019.

Walters' series of artworks based on Modest Mussorgsky's Pictures at an Exhibition was exhibited in conjunction with a symphony orchestra concert at the Alder Theatre in Davenport, IA in 2013. His 30' canvas mural of jazz musician, Bix Beiderbecke was displayed on the exterior of the German American Heritage Center and Museum in Davenport, IA in conjunction with a museum and art exhibition in 2015.

Walters has exhibited and published artworks centered on the history, traditions and symbolism of Halloween since 2007. Drawings from the Halloween Flight series were first exhibited at the Des Moines Art Center as part of the Iowa Artists 2008 exhibition. Vultus, a video sequence of one hundred cultural and Halloween masks, was projected on five art centers and galleries in October 2010 -ranging from forty foot high projections on the Figge Art Museum to an interior projection at the Contemporary Art Center in Peoria, IL. The first solo exhibition of Halloween Flight, at the Western Illinois University Art Gallery in 2009, displayed large paintings (the largest 12 x 10'), drawings, digital paintings, lenticular prints, exterior and interior video projections. The exhibition also incorporated dancers, actors and musicians -including a harpsichordist and violinist.

As a graphic designer and illustrator, Walters has created life-sized paintings for permanent display at the Hauberg Museum for the Illinois Historic Preservation Agency (temporarily displayed in Millennium Park in Chicago), political cartoons for the Quad City Times’ Editorial page; designed websites and created the artwork for book covers.

Walters' career in education began at Marycrest College in Davenport, Iowa where he assisted Alan Garfield in creating the first Bachelor of Arts program in computer graphics in 1984 (recognized by SIGGRAPH). He taught at Marycrest for twelve years, serving as Chairperson of the Communication and Fine Arts Division for six years before beginning to teach at Western Illinois University in 1997. He taught the first graduate art classes at the Figge Art Museum in Davenport, IA for Western Illinois University in 2005. Walters also taught computer art classes at Augustana College in Rock Island, IL for ten years, 2000-09.

Walters currently writes a continuing series of feature articles, "Buried Stories" and has written more than fifty "Art in Plain Sight" feature articles on public works of art published in the River Cities Reader. The Art in Plain Sight series began in 2010.
