= Victor Walters =

English footballer

Personal information
- Place of birth: England
- Date of death: '
- Position: Forward

Senior career*
Years	Team	Apps	(Gls)
1913–1914	Leicester Fosse	11	(2)
- * Club domestic league appearances and goals

Victor Walters was an English footballer who played in the Football League for Leicester Fosse.
