= Fiat 524 =

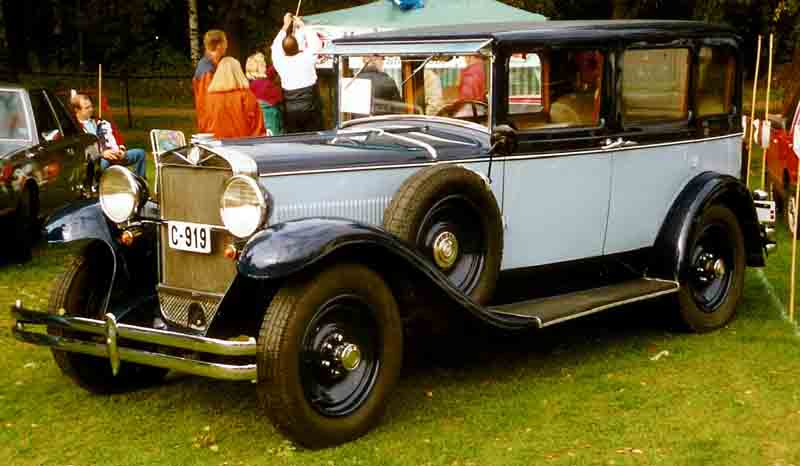
- Fiat Tipo 524 C Berlina

Overview
- Manufacturer: Fiat
- Production: 1931–1934

Body and chassis
- Class: Luxury car
- Body style: 4-door cabriolet; 4-door limousine; 4-door saloon
- Layout: Front-engine, rear-wheel-drive

Powertrain
- Engine: 2516 cc, 52 hp (39 kW), straight-6
- Transmission: 4-speed manual

Dimensions
- Wheelbase: 307 cm (120.9 in) (524 C); 323 cm (127.2 in) (522 L)
- Curb weight: 1,400–1,600 kg (3,100–3,500 lb)

Chronology
- Predecessor: Fiat 525
- Successor: Fiat 527

The Fiat 524 is a car which was produced by Italian automotive manufacturer Fiat from 1931 to 1934. The 524 was a bigger and more luxurious version of the Fiat 522 model. 10,135 cars were produced in total.

A Polish version called the Polski Fiat 524 was also built in Warsaw. The car was popular in France.

== Model types ==
- Cabriolet, 4 doors, 4 seats
- Limousine, 4 doors, 4 seats
- Saloon, 4 doors, 4 seats
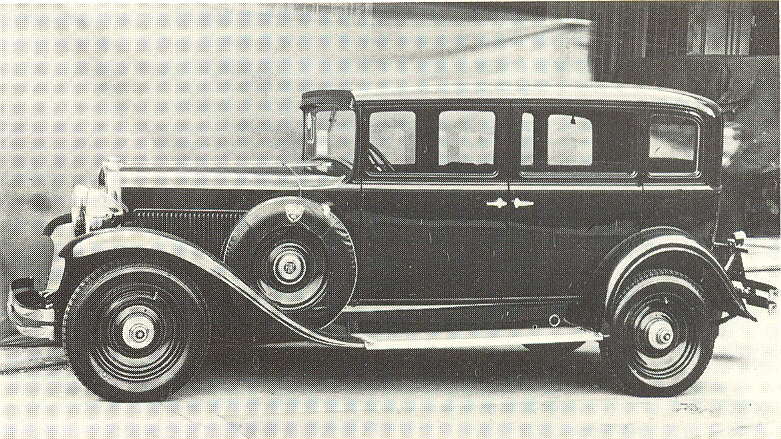
Fiat 524 C Series1 Sedan 1931

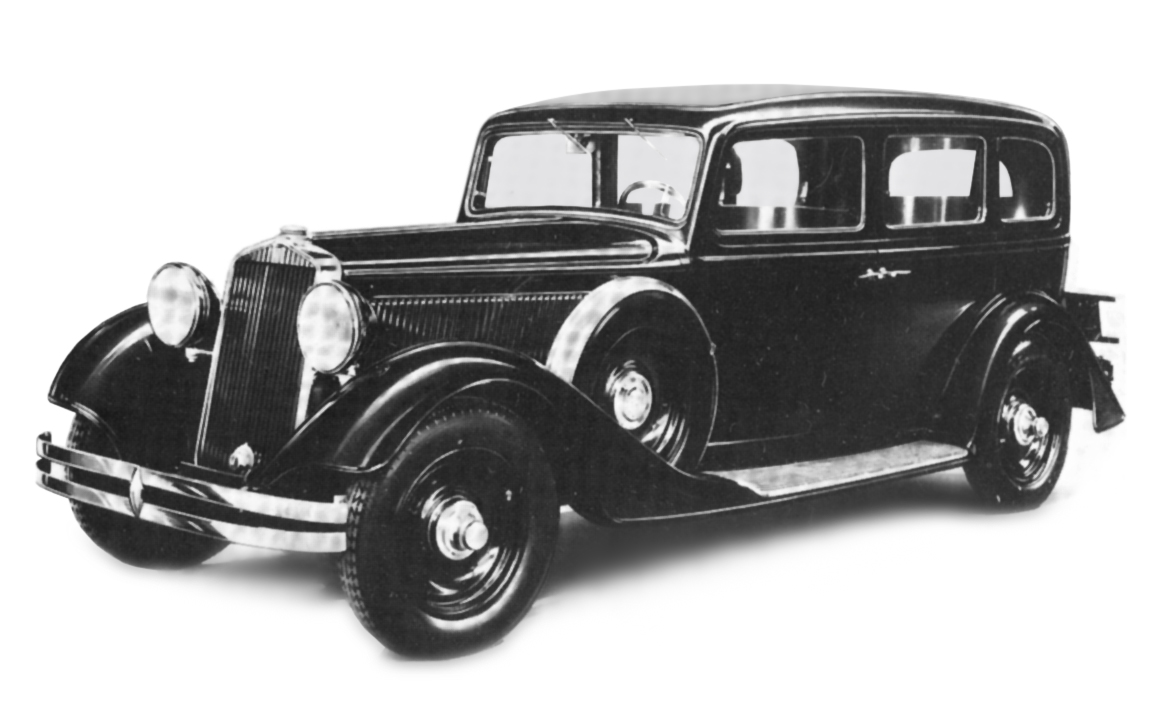
Fiat 524 L Series2 Sedan 1933
