= Andrew Walters =

Andrew or Andy Walters may refer to:

== Sports ==
- Andrew Walters (baseball)
- Andrew Walters (Canadian football); see 1994 CFL draft
- Andrew Walters (bowls)
- Andy Walters (footballer) for St. Peters Strikers FC

== Others ==
- Andrew Walters, character in Annie-for-Spite
- Andrew Walters (composer); see Electronic Music Midwest
- Andy Walters (musician); see Fiction Plane

== See also ==
- Andrew Waters (disambiguation)
- Andrew Walter, American businessman and former quarterback
