= List of storms named Walt =

The name Walt has been used for two tropical cyclones in the Western North Pacific.

- Typhoon Walt (1991) (T9104, 04W, Karing) – a Category 5 super typhoon that curved away from the Philippines.
- Typhoon Walt (1994) (T9407, 10W, Miding) – a Category 4 typhoon that struck Japan and South Korea as a tropical storm.
