= Justice Walters =

Justice Walters may refer to:

- Jesse Walters (born 1938), associate justice of the Idaho Supreme Court
- Martha Lee Walters (born 1950), associate justice of the Oregon Supreme Court
- Mary Coon Walters (1922–2001), associate justice of the New Mexico Supreme Court
