= Fiat 514 =

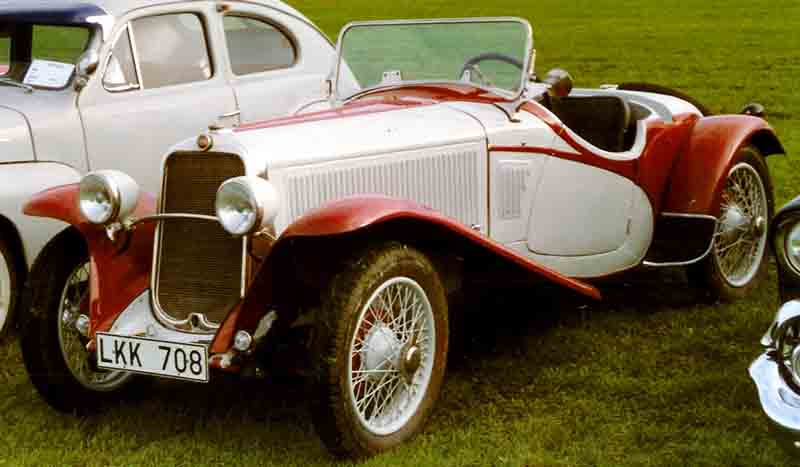
- Fiat 514 CA Spider 1931

Overview
- Manufacturer: Fiat
- Production: 1929–1932

Body and chassis
- Class: Small family car (C)
- Body style: 2- or 4-door sedan; 2- or 4-door cabriolet; 2-door spyder
- Layout: Front-engine, rear-wheel-drive

Powertrain
- Engine: 1438 cc sv I4
- Transmission: 4-speed manual

Dimensions
- Wheelbase: 256 cm (100.8 in); 277 cm (109.1 in) (514 L, MM)
- Curb weight: 900–1,000 kg (1,984–2,205 lb)

Chronology
- Predecessor: Fiat 503
- Successor: Fiat 515

The Fiat 514 is a model of car produced by the Italian automotive company Fiat between 1929 and 1932.

36,970 cars were produced in total. There were three sporting variants as well; the S (Sport), CA (Coppa dei Alpi), and MM (Mille Miglia).

== Types ==
- 2-seater plus dickey, 2 doors, a.k.a. "Spider"
- Tourer, 4 doors, 4 seats, a.k.a. "Torpedo"
- Coupé, 2 doors (fixed-head coupé type)
- Saloon, 2 doors, 4 seats
- Saloon, 4 doors, 4 seats (+ fabric saloon type)
- 514 MM 2 seater sports
- 514 CA 2 seater sports

== Engines ==
Model	Years	Engine	Displacement	Power	Fuel system
514	1929-1932	Straight-4 sidevalve	1438 cc	28 hp (21 kW)	Single carburetor
514 S	1929-1932	Straight-4 sidevalve	1438 cc	35 hp (26 kW)	Single carburetor
514 MM	1930-1932	Straight-4 sidevalve	1438 cc	37 hp (27 kW)	Single carburetor

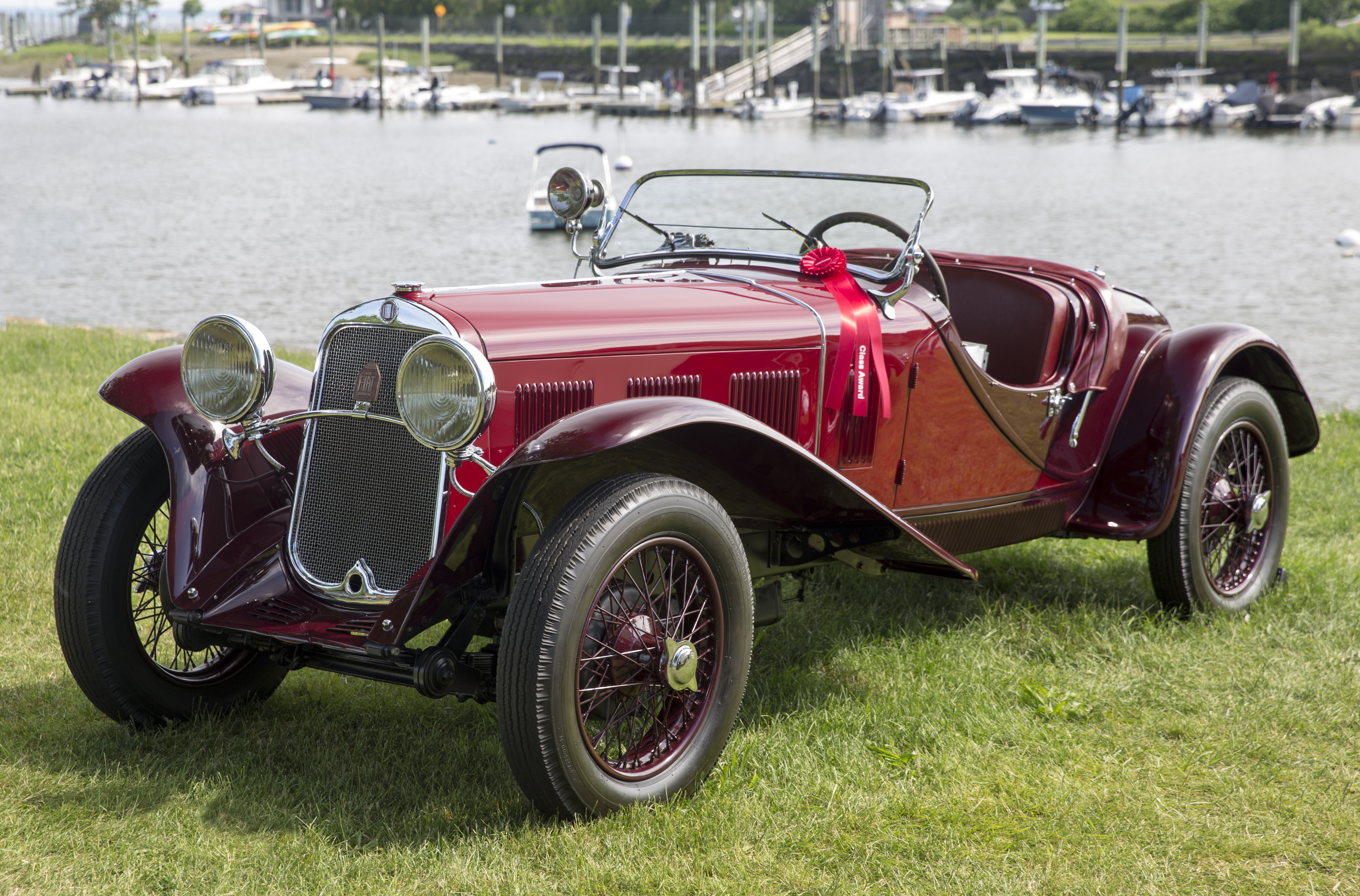
1930 Fiat 514 MM

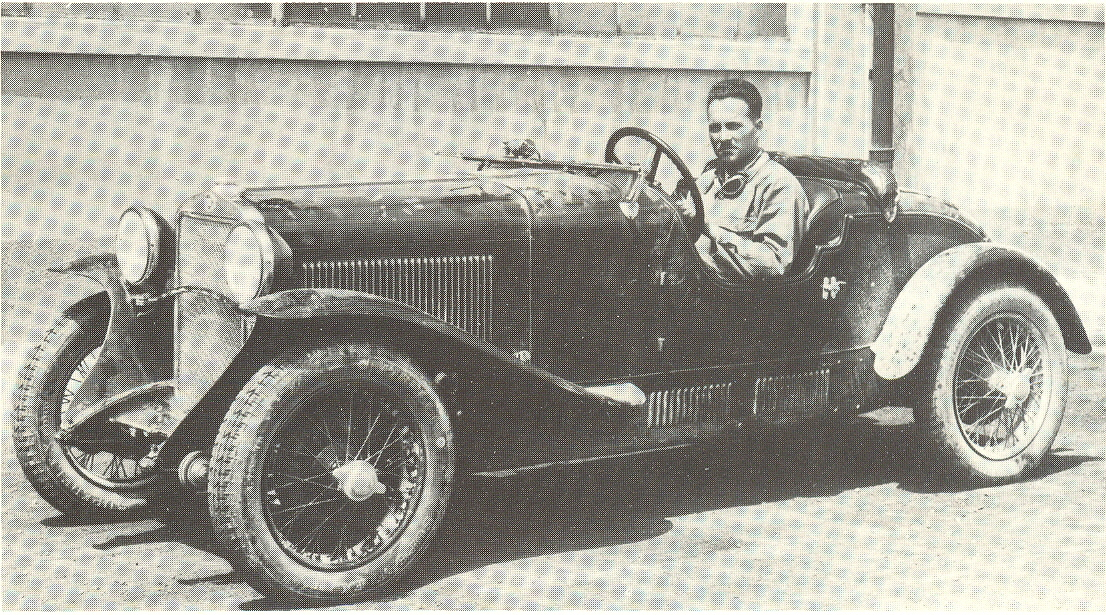
1929 Fiat 514 S

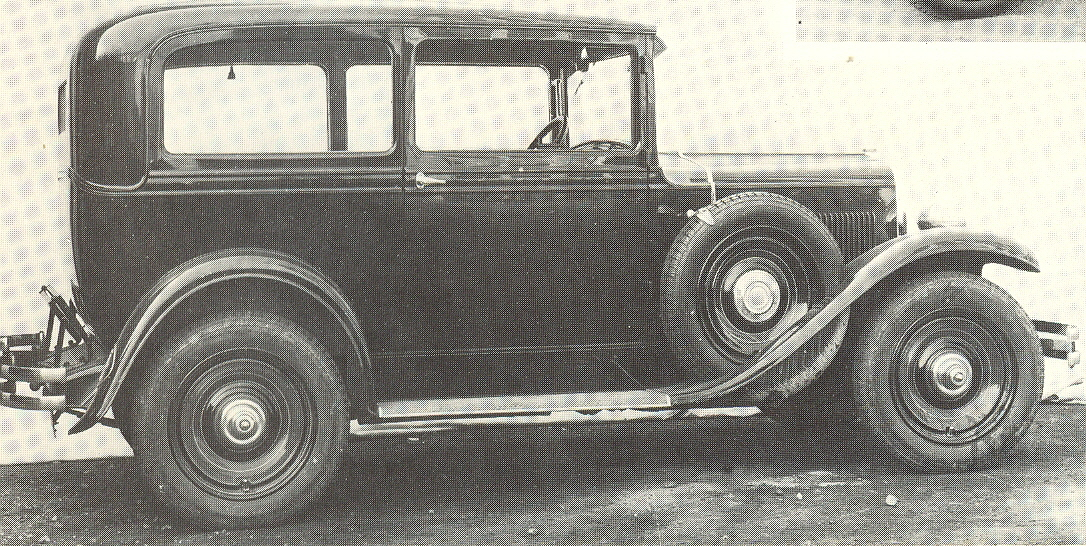
1929 Fiat 514 Sedan

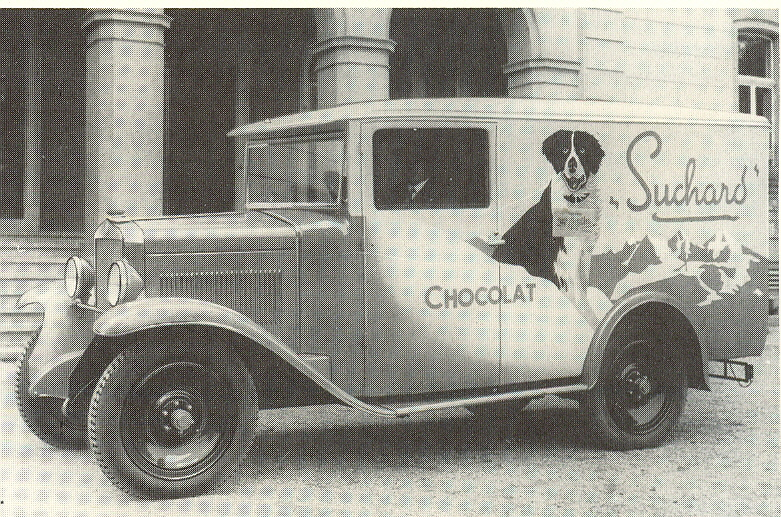
1929 Fiat 514 Van LWB

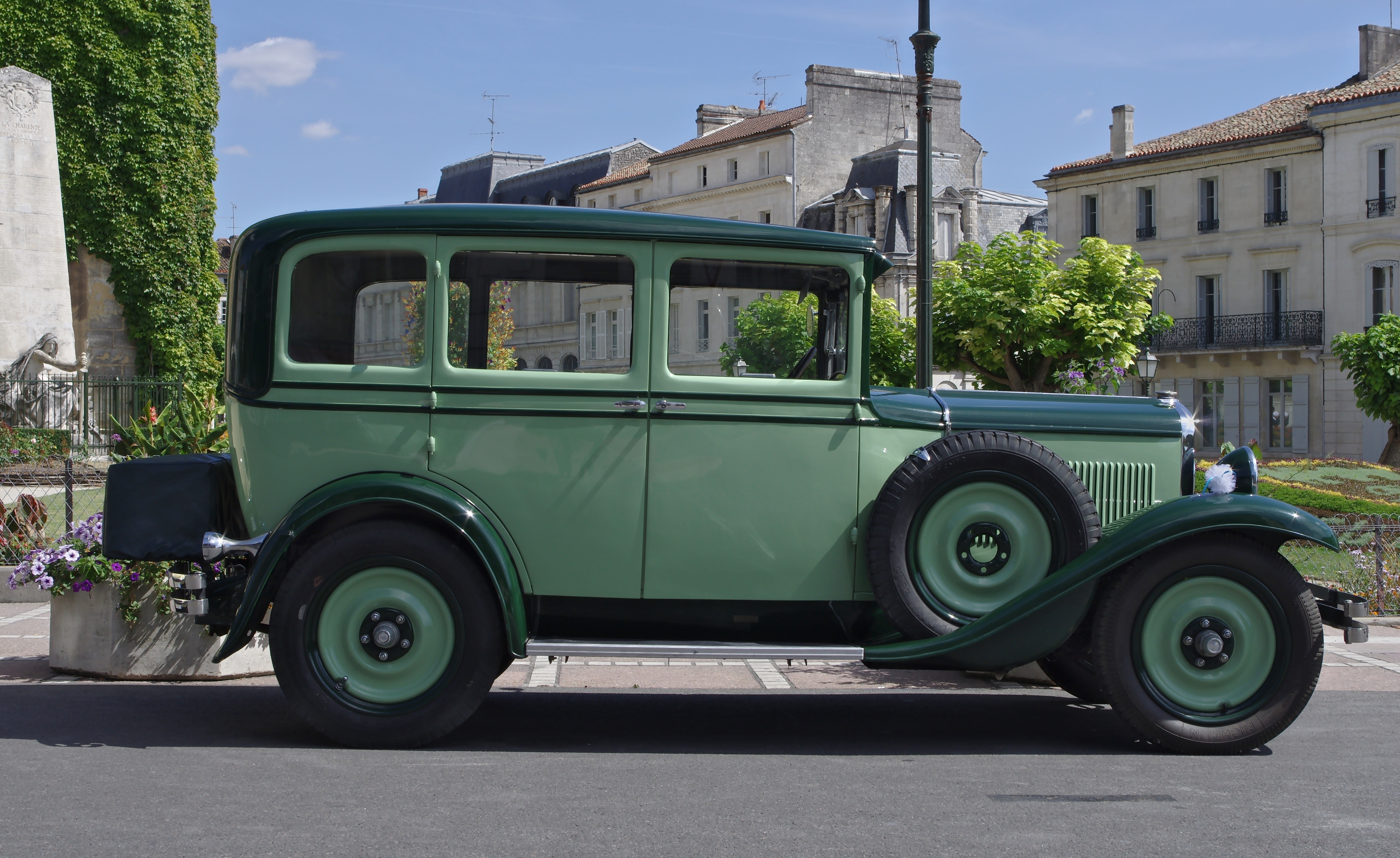
Fiat 514 L

== Walter Bijou ==
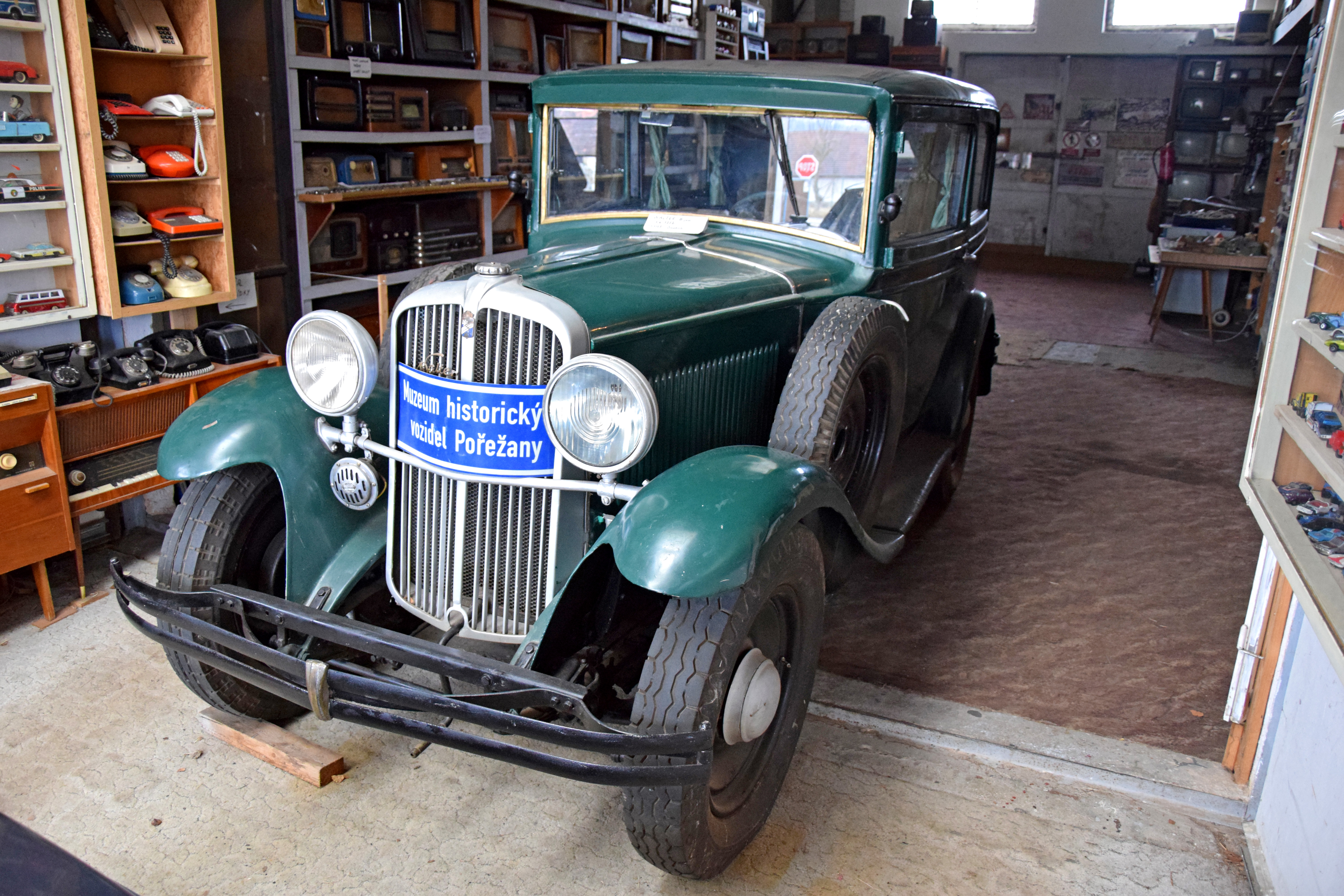
Walter Bijou in the museum in Pořežany, Czech Republic

Walter Bijou was the licensed Fiat 514, made by Czech factory Walter in the early 1930s.
