= Walter (name) =

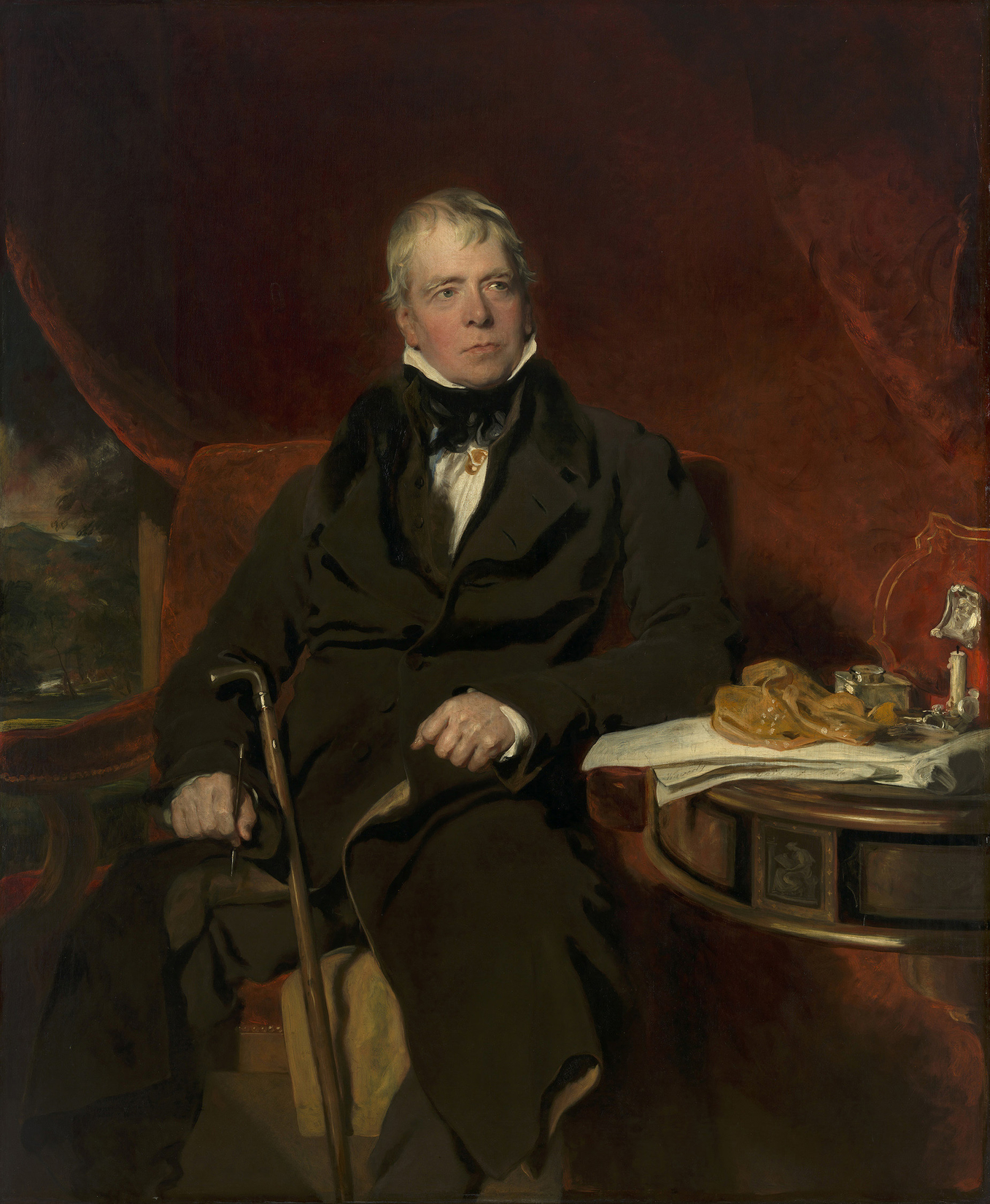
- Portrait of Sir Walter Scott by Thomas Lawrence
- Gender: Male

Origin
- Origin: Germanic
- Meaning: Army ruler, powerful ruler
- Region of origin: Northern Europe

Other names
- Nicknames: Wally, Walt
- Related names: Walther, Valter, Valtyr, Wouter, Gauthier, Gualtiero, Gutierre, Gualter, Guterres, Gutiérrez, Valteri, Valtteri, Valters

Walter is a German and English masculine given name and surname of Germanic origin, composed of the elements meaning "power" or "ruler", and "army".

== History ==
The name Walter is of Germanic origin composed of the elements walt- (Proto-Germanic *wald-) "power", "ruler", and hari (Proto-Germanic *χarja) "army".

The name is first recorded in the 6th century, with Walthari son of Wacho, who was king of the Lombards during 539–546. Old Germanic forms are recorded as Walthari, Waltari, Walthar, Waltar, Waltere, Waldheri, Waldhere, Waltheri, Walthere, Walther, Walter, Waldher, and Valter. The Old English equivalent is Wealdhere, Old Norse has Valðar and Valdarr. It was later used in modern English as Walter.

The name was popularized by the epic German hero Walther von Aquitaine, and later from the name of the writer Walther von der Vogelweide.

The name entered the French language as Gauthier, Spanish as Gutierre, Portuguese as Gualter and Italian as Gualtiero. The modern Dutch form of the name is Wouter. The German name has also been adopted in a number of languages in the spelling Valter.

== Geographical distribution ==
Around 2014, the name was most common in Germany, where around 1 in 643 people carried it. 22 percent of them live in Baden-Württemberg, 16 percent in Bavaria, and 15 percent in North Rhine-Westphalia.

== Given name ==
=== Middle ages ===
- Walter the Englishman or Gualterus Anglicus (fl. c. 1175), Anglo-Norman poet and scribe
- Walter, Count of Rethel (died 1262), French nobleman
- Walter (abbot of Evesham) or Walter de Cerisy (died 1104), English church leader
- Walter (archbishop of Sens) (fl. 887–923), French church leader
- Walter (bishop of Transylvania) (fl. 1156–1157), Hungarian church leader
- Walter (bishop of Rochester) (died 1182), English church leader
- Walter (bishop of Wrocław) (fl. 1149–1169), Episcopal Walloon
- Walter Bentley (died 1359), English knight who fought in the Hundred Years War
- Walter de Burgh (c.1210–1271), 1st Earl of Ulster, 2nd Lord of Connaught, Irish peer from the House of Burgh
- Walter Liath de Burgh (died 1332), Anglo- Irish noble
- Walter de Coutances (died 1207), Archbishop of Rouen and Chief Justiciar of England
- Walter von Cronberg (1477 or 1479–1543), 38th Grand Master of the Teutonic Order
- Walter fitz Alan, twelfth-century Scottish magnate and Steward of Scotland
- Walter fitz Gilbert of Cadzow, medieval Scottish nobleman
- Walter Tailboys (1350–1417), English landowner and politician
- Walter of Caltagirone (Baron of Giarratana and Lord of Butera) (XIII Century), Italian politician, landowner and militarian, known for his efforts during the Sicilian Vespers.

=== Modern era ===
- M. Walter F. Abeykoon (1903–?), Inspector General of the Sri Lanka Police
- Walter K. Andersen, American scholar
- Walter W. Arndt (1916–2011), German-American translator
- Walter E. Baethgen (born 1955), Uruguayan scientist
- Walter Lewis Baily Jr. (1930–2013), American mathematician
- Walter Schmidt Ballardo, Mexican musician
- Walter Bechmann (1887–1967), German actor
- Walter Bender (born 1956), president of One Laptop Per Child Software and Content
- Walter Bender (Canadian football) (born 1961), American football player
- Walter Benjamin (1892–1940), German cultural critic and philosopher
- Walter Bentley (1849–1927), Scottish-Australian Shakespearean actor
- Walter Blackman (born c. 1965/1966), American politician
- Walter H. Bourque Jr. (1937–2025), American convicted murderer
- Walter Braithwaite (1865–1945), British army general
- Walter Brennan (1894–1974), American actor
- Walter von Brockdorff-Ahlefeldt (1887–1943), German general during World War II
- Walter Cannady (1902–1981), American baseball player in the Negro leagues
- Walter Chappell (1925–2020), American photographer and poet
- Walter Chrysler (1875–1940), American industrialist
- Walter P. Chrysler Jr. (1909–1988), American art collector and museum benefactor
- Walter Clayton Jr. (born 2003), American basketball player
- Walter Cronkite (1916–2009), American journalist
- Walter Crucce (born 1974), Argentine boxer
- Walter Devaram (born 1939), Indian former Director General of Police of Tamil Nadu
- Walter Day (born 1949), American businessman, musician, and retired video game referee
- Walter Percy Day (1878–1965), English matte artist and special effects technician
- Walter D'Ávila (1911–1996), Brazilian actor and comedian
- Walter Devereux, 1st Earl of Essex (1541–1576), English nobleman and general
- Walter (Walt) Disney - creative cartoonist, global entertainment magnet
- Walter Dorsey (1771–1823), justice of the Maryland Court of Appeals
- Walter Duranty (1884–1957), Anglo-American journalist
- Walter von Eberhardt (1862–1944), German military commander during World War I and Latvian War of Independence
- Walter Eisfeld (1905–1940), German Nazi SS commandant of Sachsenhausen concentration camp
- Walter Feit (1930–2004), American mathematician
- Walter Fernando, Sri Lankan Sinhala air chief marshal, Commander of the Sri Lanka Air Force from 1986 to 1991
- Walter Fernández, Spanish professional footballer who plays for CE Manresa
- Walter Forster (disambiguation), several people
- Walter Flanagan, host of the Tell 'Em Steve-Dave! podcast and star of AMC's Comic Book Men
- Walter Gericke (1907–1991), German Luftwaffe officer during World War II and a general in the Bundeswehr of West Germany
- Walter Giardino (born 1960), Argentinian heavy metal guitarist
- Walter Gittins (1865–1890), English professional footballer
- Walter Godefroot (1943–2025), Belgian road bicycle racer and cycling team manager
- Walter E. Gregory (1857–1918), American physician
- Walter Gretzky (1938–2021), Canadian cable repairman and father of Wayne Gretzky
- Walter Gropius (1883–1969), German architect
- Walter Hagen (1892–1969), American golfer
- Walter Hagen (aviator) (1897–1963), German general, aviator and Luftwaffe pilot during World War II
- Walter Hallstein (1901–1982), German diplomat and statesman
- Walter Heck, German graphic designer
- Walter Heitz (1878–1944), German general during World War II
- C. Walter Hodges (1909–2004), English artist and writer best known for illustrating children's books and for helping to recreate Elizabethan theatre
- Walter Ihoshi (born 1961), Brazilian politician
- Walter Jayawardena (born 1910; died unknown), Solicitor General of Sri Lanka
- Walter Johnson (1887–1946), American baseball player
- Walter von Keudell (1884–1973), German forest expert and politician
- Walter Keane (1915–2000), American plagiarist, known for claiming MDH Keane's big-eyed waif paintings as his own
- Walter Kirn (born 1962), American author
- Walter Knott (1889–1981), American farmer
- Walter Koenig (1936–2026), American actor
- Walter Kolodziej, American politician
- Walter R. Kramer (1914–1995), US badminton champion
- Walter Kreye (born 1942), German actor
- Walter Davis Lambert (1879–1968), American geodesist
- Walter Lantz (1899–1994), American animator, cartoonist and film producer
- Walter Lieck (1906–1944), German actor
- Walter Livingston (1922-2011), American architect
- Walter L. Lovelace (1831–1866), Missouri lawyer and politician
- Walter Luchetti (born 1937), Italian politician
- Walter Lübcke (1953–2019), German politician
- Walter Martos (born 1957), Peruvian general and prime minister
- Walter James Macqueen-Pope (1888–1960), English threatre historian
- Walter Matthau (1920–2000), American actor
- Walter Mazzarri (born 1961), Italian football manager
- Walter T. McCarthy (1898–1985), American lawyer and judge
- Walter R. McComas (1879–1922), American politician and lawyer
- Walter Mercado (1932–2019), Puerto Rican astrologer also known as Shanti Ananda
- Walter Millar, unionist politician in Northern Ireland
- Walter Miller (disambiguation), multiple people
- Walter Mirisch (1921–2023), American film producer
- Walter Mondale (1928–2021), American politician, Vice President of the United States (1977–1981) and 1984 Democratic Party presidential candidate
- Walter "Junie" Morrison (1954–2017), American funk musician, member of the Ohio Players
- Walter Moser (1881-1946), American baseball player
- Walter Mosley (born 1952) American novelist
- Walter Andreas Müller (born 1945), Swiss actor and comedian
- Walter Murch (born 1943), American film editor and sound designer
- Walter Dean Myers (born Walter Milton Myers, 1937–2014), American author
- Walter Niephaus (1923–1992), German chess master
- Walter Nolen (born 2003), American football player
- Walter O'Brien (born 1975), Irish businessman
- Walter D. O'Hearn (1910–1969), Canadian journalist
- Walter Olkewicz (1948–2021), American actor
- Walter Ophey (1882–1930), German painter
- Walter Packer (born 1955), American football player
- Walter Palmore (born 1996), American football player
- Walter Payton (1953–1999), American football player
- Walter Pedraza (born 1981), Colombian road-cyclist
- Walter Pidgeon (1897–1984), Canadian actor
- Walter Piston (1894–1976), American composer
- Walter Poddubny (1960–2009), Canadian hockey player
- Walter Raleigh (c. 1552/1554–1618), English explorer
- Walter Rauff (1906–1984), German Nazi SS colonel accused of directing the killing of hundreds of thousands of Jews in mobile gassing vans
- Walter Reed (1851–1902), US Army physician and medical researcher
- Walter Riseman, American politician
- Walther Ritz (1878–1909), Swiss theoretical physicist
- Walter Rodney (1942–1980), Guyanese historian and political activist
- Walter Röhrl (born 1947), German rally world champion
- Walter Romberg (1928–2014), German politician
- Walter Rouse, American football player
- Walter Runte (Fl. 2022), American politician
- Walter Samuel (born 1978), Argentine footballer
- Walter B. Sands (1870–1938), chief justice of the Montana Supreme Court
- Walter Schellenberg (1910–1952), German SS functionary during the Nazi era
- Walter Schreifels (born 1969), American musician
- Wally Schirra (1923–2007), American astronaut
- Walter Scott (disambiguation), several people
  - Walter Scott (1771–1832), Scottish novelist and poet
- Walter Sheridan, an investigator for various agencies of the US government
- Walter Short (1880–1949), American lieutenant general responsible for US military installations in Hawaii at the time of the Japanese attack on Pearl Harbor
- Walter Siegmeister (1903–1965), American esotericist
- Walter Sillers (1852–1931), American lawyer and planter
- Walter Sillers Jr. (1888–1966), American politician and white supremacist
- Walter Sisulu (1912–2003), South African politician
- Walter Smith (1948–2021), Scottish football player and manager
- Walter Bedell Smith (1895–1961), senior officer of the United States Army who served as chief of staff at Allied Forces Headquarters (AFHQ) during the Tunisia Campaign and the Allied invasion of Italy in 1943, during World War II
- Walter Shaw Sparrow (1862–1940), British writer on art and architecture
- Walter Spradbery (1889–1969), British designer, painter and poet
- Walter Stewart (disambiguation), several people
- Walter Tetley (1915–1975), American child actor
- Walter Tewksbury (1876–1968), American athlete
- Walter Thurnherr (born 1963), Swiss government official, Chancellor of Switzerland
- Walter Ulbricht (1893–1973), German politician, leader of East Germany, 1950–71
- Walter Vail (1852–1906), American businessman
- Walter Veltroni (born 1955), Italian writer, journalist and politician
- Walter Waalderbos (born 1951), Dutch footballer
- Walter Wellbrock (1893–1944), American farmer and politician
- Walter Bruce Willis - American Actor, Die Hard movies (notably goes by "Bruce Willis).
- Walter Whitman (1819–1892), American poet, journalist, essayist and humanist
- Walter Willison (born 1947), American actor, singer, writer, director and producer
- Walter Wilson (baseball) (1913–1994), American baseball player
- Walter Wilson (biographer) (c. 1781 – 1847), English biographer
- Walter Wilson (cricketer) (1843–1865), New Zealand cricketer
- Walter Wilson (footballer, born 1865), English footballer
- Walter Wilson (footballer, fl. 1894), English footballer
- Walter Wilson (gridiron football) (born 1966), American football player
- Walter Wilson (rugby union) (1885–1968), British Army officer & England rugby union player
- Walter Gordon Wilson (1874–1957), Irish mechanical engineer and inventor
- Walter Henry Wilson (1839–1904), Irish ship designer
- Walter K. Wilson Jr. (1906–1985), United States Army general
- Walter K. Wilson Sr. (1880–1954), US Army major general
- Walter Winchell (1897–1972), American columnist and radio news commentator
- Walter Zapp (1905–2003), Baltic German inventor
- Walter Zenga (born 1960), Italian football manager and former player
- Walter E. Zink, US Army major general

=== Fictional and legendary characters ===
- Walter of Aquitaine, a Visigoth king in Germanic heroic legend
- Walter (Muppet), a Muppet character introduced in the 2011 film The Muppets
- Walter, a puppet of ventriloquist Jeff Dunham (born 1962)
- Walter the Softy (real name Walter Brown), arch-enemy of Dennis the Menace from The Beano comic since 1953
- Dr. Walter Bishop (Fringe), a scientist on the 2008–2013 TV series Fringe
- Walter Blythe, in the Anne of Green Gables novels Anne of Ingleside, Rainbow Valley, and Rilla of Ingleside
- Walter Donovan, the main antagonist of the 1989 film Indiana Jones and the Last Crusade
- Walter C. Dornez, from the anime/manga series Hellsing
- Walter E. Kurtz, the main antagonist of the 1979 film Apocalypse Now
- Walter Longmire, the title character in Craig Johnson's A Longmire Mystery Series and main protagonist of A&E and Netflix's LONGMIRE television series
- Walter Mitty, the title character in James Thurber's 1939 short story The Secret Life of Walter Mitty
- Walter White, the protagonist of the 2008–2013 TV series Breaking Bad

== Surname ==
=== Medieval ===
- Walter, or FitzWalter, an armigerous family in Norman England
  - Theobald Walter, 1st Chief Butler of Ireland
  - Hubert Walter (c. 1160 – 13 July 1205), English archbishop and justiciar

=== Early modern ===
- Johann Walter (1496–1570), German composer and poet
- Thomas Walter (botanist) (1740–1789), British-born American botanist
- Anton Walter (1752–1826), German piano maker
- Ignaz Walter (1755–1822), Austrian opera singer and composer

=== Modern ===
- Andrew Walter (born 1982), American football quarterback
- Ben Walter (born 1984), Canadian ice hockey player
- Bianca Walter (born 1990), German short track speed skater
- Brandon Walter (born 1996), American baseball player
- Bruno Walter (1876–1962), German-American conductor and composer
- Carl Walter (c. 1831–1907), German-Australian botanist and photographer
- Daniel Walter (born 1991), German politician
- David Walter (disambiguation), several people
- Eleanor Walter (1910–1997), American painter
- Emma Walter (1833/34–1893), British artist
- Eugene Walter (1921–1998), American writer and actor
- Francis E. Walter (1894–1963), American politician
- Fritz Walter (football executive) (1900–1981), German football executive
- Fritz Walter (footballer born 1960), German footballer
- Fritz Walter (politician) (1896–1977), German politician
- Fritz Walter (1920–2002), German footballer
- Hannes Walter (born 1984), German politician
- Harriet Walter (born 1950), British actress
- Harvey Washington Walter (1819–1878), American lawyer and railroad business executive
- Hellmuth Walter (1900–1980), German engineer
- Howard Arnold Walter (1883–1918), American Congregationalist minister, author, and hymn writer
- Hubert Walter (1930–2008), German anthropologist
- Ja'Kobe Walter (born 2004), American basketball player
- Jamie Campbell-Walter (born 1972), British professional racing driver
- Jean Walter (1883–1957), French architect
- Jean-Claude Walter (1940–2025), French poet and writer
- Jess Walter (born 1965), American novelist
- Jessica Walter (1941–2021), American actress
- Joachim Walter (1940–2021), East German football player
- Joe Walter (American football) (born 1963), American football tackle
- Joe Walter (footballer) (1895–1995), British football player
- Joe Walter (Ohio politician) (born 1947), former member of the Ohio House of Representatives
- John Walter (businessman) (1850–1920), Canadian business entrepreneur
- Joseph Walter (1783–1856), British marine artist
- Kevin Walter (born 1981), American football wide receiver
- Leonie Maria Walter (born 2004), German biathlete
- Lisa Ann Walter (born 1963), American actress, comedian, television producer
- Ottmar Walter (1924–2013), German footballer
- Otto F. Walter (1928–1994), Swiss journalist, author and publisher
- Owen Walter (born 1979), Canadian ice hockey defenceman
- Raymond Walter (born 1972), American politician, New York State Assemblyman
- Rita Walter (1931–2020), American actress
- Ruedi Walter (1916–1990), Swiss comedian and actor
- Ryan Walter (born 1958), Canadian hockey player
- Sebastian Walter (born 1990), German politician
- Silja Walter (1919–2011), Swiss author and Benedictine nun
- Thomas U. Walter (1804–1887), American architect
- Tracey Walter (born 1947), American character actor
- Ulrich Walter (born 1954), German astronaut
- Young Singleton Walter (1811–1883), American politician

== See also ==
- Valter
- Vladimir (name)
- Wallace (disambiguation)
- Walther
- Wally (disambiguation),
- Walt, name
- Walters (disambiguation)
- Wat (disambiguation)
- Waldemar (disambiguation)
