= Walther =

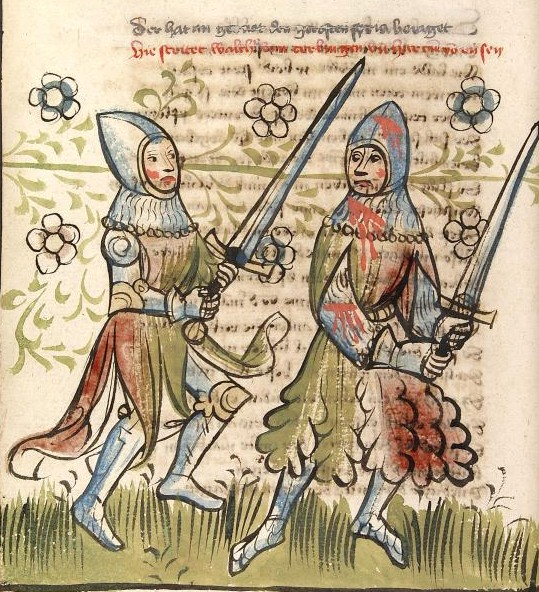
- Walther fights Hartunc
- Pronunciation: valt-her
- Gender: Male

Origin
- Origin: Old German
- Meaning: "powerful warrior", "bright warrior" or "forest warrior"
- Region of origin: Northern Europe

Other names
- Related names: Walt, Walter, Valtyr, Wouter, Gauthier, Gualtiero, Gutierre, Gutierrez, Gautier

Walther (German: [ˈvaltɐ]) is a masculine given name and a surname. It is a German form of Walter, which is derived from the Old High German Walthari, containing the elements wald -"power", "brightness" or "forest" and hari -"warrior".

The name was first popularized by the famous epic German hero Walther von Aquitaine and later with the Minnesänger Walther von der Vogelweide.

== Given name ==
- Walther Bauersfeld (1879–1959), German engineer who built the first projection planetarium
- Walther Bothe (1891–1957), German nuclear physicist and Nobel laureate
- Walther von Brauchitsch (1881–1948), German World War II field marshal
- Walther Dahl (1916–1985), German World War II flying ace
- Walther von Dyck (1856–1934), German mathematician
- Walther Flemming (1843–1905), German biologist and a founder of cytogenetics
- Walther Funk (1890–1960), economist and Nazi official convicted of war crimes in the Nuremberg Trials
- Walther Hahm (1894–1951), German World War II general
- Walther Hewel (1904–1945), German diplomat and one of Hitler's few personal friends
- Walther von Klingen (died March 1, 1284), Minnesänger and Nobleman from Thurgau
- Walther Kossel (1888–1956), German physicist
- Walther von Lüttwitz (1859–1942), German general and a leader of the unsuccessful Kapp-Lüttwitz Putsch against the Weimar Republic
- Walther Meissner (1882–1974), German technical physicist and discoverer of the Meissner effect
- Walther Müller (1905–1979), German physicist
- Walther Otto Müller (1833–1887), German botanist
- Walther Nehring (1892–1983), German World War II general
- Walther Nernst (1864–1941), German physical chemist and physicist; Nobel laureate in chemistry
- Walther Rathenau (1867–1922), German industrialist, politician, writer, statesman and Foreign Minister of Germany for the Weimar Republic
- Walther Ritz (1878–1909), Swiss theoretical physicist
- Walther Schroth (1882–1944), German World War II general
- Walther Schwieger (1885–1917), German World War I U-boat commander who sank the Lusitania
- Walther von Seydlitz-Kurzbach, German World War II general
- Walther Stampfli (1884–1965), Swiss politician
- Walther von der Vogelweide (c. 1170–c. 1230), High German lyric poet
- Walther Wenck (1900–1982), youngest general in the German Army during World War II
- Walther Wever (general) (1887–1936), German general, commander of the Luftwaffe and proponent of strategic bombing
- Walther Wever (pilot) (1923–1945), German flying ace and son of the above

== Surname ==
- Andrea Walther (born 1970), German mathematician
- Augustin Friedrich Walther (1688–1746), German anatomist
- Bernhard Walther (1430–1504), German astronomer for whom a lunar crater is named
- C. F. W. Walther (1811–1887), German-American first President of the Lutheran Church–Missouri Synod and its most influential theologian
- Carl Walther (1858–1915), German gunsmith and founder of Walther Arms
- Christoph Walther (born 1950), German computer scientist
- David Walther (born 2008), Danish racing driver
- Edgar Walther (1930-2013), Swiss chess player
- Eric Walther (born 1975), German pentathlete
- Erich Walther (1903–1947), German World War II general
- Frédéric Henri Walther (1761–1813), Alsatian-born general in Napoleon's army
- Friedrich Ludwig Walther (1759–1824), German cameralist and forester
- George Walther Sr. (1876–1961), American inventor
- George H. Walther (1828–1895), American politician
- Geraldine Walther (born 1950), American violist
- Gesine Walther (born 1962), German sprinter
- Johann Gottfried Walther (1684–1748), German organist and composer
- Johann Jakob Walther (composer) (1650–1704), German composer/violinist
- Johann Jakob Walther (1600–1679), German artist and botanical illustrator
- Johannes Walther (1860–1937), German geologist
- Kerstin Walther (born 1961), German sprinter
- Kirsten Walther (1933–1987), Danish actress
- Philipp Franz von Walther (1782–1849), German doctor
- Christoph Theodosius Walther (1699–1741), German missionary
- Ute Walther (1942-2026), German mezzo soprano

== See also ==
- Walther (disambiguation)
- Walter (name)
