= Gaultier =

Gaultier (French: [gotje]) is a name of French origin. It may refer to:

== People ==
- Grégory Gaultier (born 1982), French squash player
- Bon Gaultier, a pen name of the British writers William Edmondstoune Aytoun (1813–1865) and Sir Theodore Martin (1816–1909)
- Denis Gaultier (1597 or 1602/3–1672), French lutenist and composer
- Ennemond Gaultier (c. 1575–1651), French lutenist and composer
- Jacques Gaultier (c. 1600–1652), French lutenist
- Jean-Jacques Gaultier (born 1963), member of the National Assembly of France
- Jean Paul Gaultier (born 1952), French fashion designer
- Jules de Gaultier (1858–1942), French philosopher
- Pierre Gaultier (c. 1599–1681), French scholar, lutenist and composer
- Pierre Gaultier de Varennes, sieur de La Vérendrye (1685–1749), French Canadian military officer, fur trader and explorer
- Walter of Pontoise (c. 1030–c. 1099), or Gaultier of Pontoise, French abbot and Roman Catholic saint
- Léon Gaultier (1915–1997), French collaborator
- Léonard Gaultier (1561–1641), French engraver

== Other uses ==
- Gaultier (barony), a barony in County Waterford, Ireland
- Gaultier GAA, a Gaelic Athletic Association club in Dunmore East, County Waterford, Ireland

== See also ==
- Gauleiter, a Nazi German regional commander
- Leopoldo Galtieri (1926–2003), Argentine general, president, and junta leader
- Gotye (born 1980), Belgian-Australian musician, singer, songwriter
- Gautier (disambiguation)
- Gauthier (disambiguation)
- Vautier, a surname
