= Wouter =

- Pronunciation: [ˈʋʌutər]
- Gender: Male

Origin
- Origin: Old Dutch
- Meaning: "ruler of the army", "bright army"
- Region of origin: Low Countries

Other names
- Nickname: Wout
- Related names: Valter, Valtyr, Walter, Gauthier, Gualterio, Gualtierre

Wouter is a Dutch masculine given name popular in the Netherlands and Belgium. It is the Dutch equivalent of the English name Walter and French name Gauthier, both of Germanic origin, meaning "ruler of the army", "ruler of the forest" or "bright army". Wouter is sometimes shortened to Wout. The patronymic surname of Wouter is Wouters.

== People named Wouter ==
=== Sports ===
==== Cycling ====
- Wouter Mol, Dutch professional road racing cyclist
- Wouter Poels, Dutch professional road cyclist
- Wout van Aert, Belgian professional road cyclist
- Wouter Wippert, Dutch professional road cyclist
- Wouter Weylandt, Belgian professional cyclist
- Wouter Sybrandy, Dutch professional road racing cyclist
- Wout Wagtmans, Dutch road racing cyclist

==== Football ====
- Wouter Corstjens, Dutch-Belgian footballer
- Wouter Biebauw, Belgian footballer
- Wouter Marinus, Dutch professional footballer
- Wouter de Vogel, Dutch footballer
- Wouter van der Steen, Dutch professional footballer
- Wouter Degroote, Belgian footballer
- Wouter Scheelen, Belgian footballer
- Wouter Artz, Dutch professional footballer
- Wouter Gudde, Dutch footballer
- Wouter Vrancken, Belgian footballer
- Wout Weghorst, Dutch footballer

==== Other sports ====
- Wouter olde Heuvel, Dutch speed skater
- Wouter Claes, Belgian badminton player
- Wouter Toledo, Dutch figure skater
- Wouter Jolie, Dutch field hockey player
- Wouter Brouwer, Dutch fencer
- Wouter van Pelt, Dutch field hockey player
- Wouter D'Haene, Belgian sprint canoer
- Wouter Vandenhaute, Belgian sports journalist
- Wouter Leefers, Dutch field hockey player
- Wouter ter Maat, Dutch volleyball player

=== Entertainment ===
- Wouter "Wally" De Backer, Belgian-Australian multi-instrumentalist and singer-songwriter, known as Gotye
- Wouter Deprez, Belgian comedian
- Wouter Hamel, Dutch pop singer
- Wouter Barendrecht, Dutch film producer
- Wouter Janssen, Dutch musician
- Wouter Kellerman, South African flautist
- Wouter van der Goes, Dutch radio DJ

=== Politics ===
- Wouter Beke, Belgian politician
- Wouter Van Bellingen, Flemish politician
- Wouter Van Besien, Belgian politician
- Wouter Bos, Dutch politician
- Wouter van Harselaar, Dutch politician
- Wouter Koolmees, Dutch politician
- Wouter De Vriendt, Belgian politician

=== Art ===
- Wouter Crabeth I, Dutch Renaissance glass painter
- Wouter Crabeth II, Dutch Golden Age painter and grandson of Wouter Crabeth I
- Wouter Knijff, Dutch Golden Age landscape painter
- Wouter Abts, Belgian painter
- Wouterus Verschuur, Dutch painter
- Wouter Johannes van Troostwijk, Dutch 19th century painter

=== Other ===
- Wouter Basson (born 1950), South African cardiologist
- Wouter Biesiot (1951–1998), Dutch head of the Energy and Materials Group
- Wouter Deelen (c.1500–1563), Dutch Anabaptist
- Wouter den Haan (born 1962), Dutch Professor of Economics
- Wouter Hanegraaff (born 1961), Dutch Professor of History of Hermetic Philosophy
- Wouter Lutkie (1887–1968), Dutch Catholic priest and fascist
- Wouter Schievink (born 1963), Dutch neurological surgeon
- Wouter Snijders (1928–2020), Dutch judge and legal scholar
- Wouter Tebbens (born 1974), Dutch activist
- Wouter van Twiller (1606–1654), Dutch West India Company employee

== See also ==
- Walter
- Walters
- Wolter
- Walther
