= Volter =

Volter is a given name and surname. It may refer to:

- Claude Volter (1933–2002), Belgian comedian and theatre director, father of Philippe Volter
- Philippe Volter (1959–2005), Belgian actor and director
- Volter Kilpi (1874–1939), Finnish author born Volter Ericsson

== See also ==
- Valter, another given name and surname
