= Gautier =

Gautier may refer to:

== People ==
- Gautier or Walter of Pontoise (c. 1030 – c. 1099), French saint
- Gautier le Leu, thirteenth-century French poet
- Gautier (surname)

== Places ==
- Gautier, Dominican Republic, a municipal district in the San Pedro de Macorís province
- Gautier, Mississippi, a city in Jackson County, Mississippi, United States

== Other uses ==
- Gautier furniture, French furniture manufacturer
- Gautier-Languereau, French publishing house founded by Gautier and Maurice Languereau

== See also ==
- Gaultier (disambiguation)
- Gauthier
- Gotye (born 1980), Belgian-Australian musician, singer, songwriter
- Vautier
