= Valter =

- Gender: masculine

Origin
- Origin: Germanic
- Meaning: "rule" + "army"

Other names
- Related names: Walther, Walter, Valtyr

Valter is a spelling variant of the German name Walter, Walther, from Old High German walt "rule" and her "army". The spelling variant in V- is adopted in a number of European languages, including Scandinavian (North Germanic), Finnic (Finnish, Estonian), Slavic (Slovenian, Croatian), Baltic (Latvian, Lithuanian) and Romance (Italian, Portuguese).

Notable people with the name include:

== Given name ==
- Valter (Brazilian footballer), Brazilian football striker Valter Silva do Nascimento (born 1975)
- Valter Birsa (born 1986), Slovenian footballer
- Valter Bonča (born 1968), Slovenian racing cyclist
- Valter Borges (born 1988), Cape Verdean footballer
- Valter Chifu (born 1952), Romanian volleyball player
- Valter Costa (born 1949), Portuguese footballer
- Valter Dešpalj (1947–2023), Croatian cellist
- Valter Di Salvo (born 1963), Italian fitness coach
- Valter Ever (1902–1981), Estonian track and field athlete
- Valter Gabrielsen (1921–1999), Norwegian politician
- Valter Guchua (born 1975), Georgian footballer
- Valter Heuer (1928–2006), Estonian chess player, chess journalist and chess historian
- Valter Klauson (1914-1988), Soviet politician
- Valter Lang (born 1958), Estonian archaeologist
- Valter Lundgren (1917–1997), Swedish footballer
- Valter Matošević (born 1970), Croatian team handball player
- Valter Neeris (1915–1942), Estonian footballer
- Valter Ojakäär (1923–2016), Estonian composer, instrumentalist and author
- Valter Palm (1905–1994), Estonian boxer
- Valter Perić (1919–1945), Yugoslav partisan
- Valter Roman (1913–1983), Romanian communist activist and soldier
- Valter Sanaya (1925–1999), Soviet footballer
- Valter Skarsgård (born 1995), Swedish actor
- Valter Soosõrv (1903–1969), Estonian actor, theatre director and theatre historian
- Valter Ignacio Silva Souza (born 1997), Brazilian mixed martial artist, known as Valter Walker
- Valter Tomaz Júnior (born 1978), Brazilian footballer
- Valter Wredberg, Swedish sprint canoer
- Valter Župan (born 1938), Croatian Catholic prelate

== Surname ==
- Attila Valter (born 1998), Hungarian cyclist
- Edgar Valter (1929–2006), Estonian writer and illustrator of children's books

== Pseudonym ==
- Vladimir Perić (1919–1945), Yugoslav Partisan commander

== Fictional characters ==
- Valter, a character from the tactical role-playing game Fire Emblem: The Sacred Stones
- Valter Beilschmidt (not a canonical name but used in the fandom), also known as Germania, from the 2009 anime Hetalia

== See also ==
- Valtteri
- Volter, another given name and surname
- Valtinho (disambiguation)
- Walter (name)
- Walters (disambiguation)
