= Walther (disambiguation) =

Walther is both a given name and a surname.

Walther may also refer to:

- Walther (crater), on the Moon
- Carl Walther GmbH, a German arms manufacturer
- Walther Avenue, Baltimore, Maryland
- Walther Boulevard, Baltimore County, Maryland

== See also ==
- Walter (name)
- Walther's Law, in geology
