= Size (band) =

Mexican punk rock band

- Origin: Mexico City, Mexico
- Genres: Punk rock; post-punk; new wave
- Years active: 1979–1985
- Labels: New Rocker; Rock'n'Roll Circus; Cleopatra
- Past members: Illy Bleeding; Walter Schmidt; Carlos Robledo; Dean Stylette; Carlos Warman

Size was a Mexican punk rock band from Mexico City active between 1979 and 1985. Its members were Illy Bleeding (Jaime Keller), Dennis Sanborns (Walter Schmidt Ballardo), This Grace (Carlos Robledo) and Dean Stylette (Alfonso Moctezuma). Size's songs featured the use of synthesizers, and lyrics were written and sung in either Spanish or English. A compilation of their singles and previously unreleased songs was released in 1991 on the Rock'n'Roll Circus label, and in 2018 their unreleased 1984 album Nadie Puede Vivir con un Monstruo was released by Cleopatra Records.

== History ==
Lead vocalist Jaime Keller Cortina, known under the pseudonym of Illy Bleeding, arrived in Mexico in late 1977 after living and studying in Toronto, Canada. There he had contacts that established his own stage and musical style, such as David Bowie and members of The Clash and other punk bands. Later, he met Walter Schmidt and Carlos Robledo, who had finished their project called Decibel, a band dedicated to experimental music and Rock in Opposition. Upon arriving in Mexico, Keller became aware of the censorship of Mexican rock by the Institutional Revolutionary Party, resulting in the band playing at hoyo fonky concerts and gay bars at that time. Keller was part of Lady Bleed and Plastic Cocks before the creation of Size.

Walter Schmidt was editor and columnist for the magazine Sonido, where he wrote about new rock genres and international underground bands.

In a 2012 interview for the radio program La Ruleta, Walter Schmidt comments on the origins of Size:

"And since Decibel had disbanded, we were a little disappointed because there has never been much following for experimental music in Mexico, so we started to do something more... well, not exactly commercial but more accessible that was like punk/new wave that we did, also with very electronic things and little noises (...)."

During its short period of activity, Size had several live performances in underground venues in Mexico City, together with the band Dangerous Rhythm (later Ritmo Peligroso) laid many of the foundations of what would become punk in Mexico. In the working class areas in the north of the city, a more anarchic punk movement took shape in the early eighties with bands such as Rebel'd Punk, Massacre 68 and Síndrome.

== Later projects ==
After the dissolution of Size following a concert in Cuernavaca in 1985, Walter Schmidt and Carlos Robledo joined Ulalume Zavala and Humberto Álvarez to form the synthpop group Casino Shanghai, in which they recorded the album Film. Presently, Schmidt continues to perform on Mexican stages with a repertoire closer to electroacoustic and concrete music. In 2005 he recorded an album entitled Ríos de Sangre. Illy Bleeding formed several projects such as OD (1994), El Abrigo de Eva Fink with Rene Cremieux (2002), Multiple Side Effects (2004), Smelling Colors (2005) and El Gabinete Azul (2008). In his last project he performed as Illy Bleeding y Los Robotes Trucosos, a group with which he performed both new compositions and songs by Size.

Illy Bleeding died on October 26, 2010, as a result of a car collision three days prior. Illy Bleeding y Los Robotes Trucosos' self-titled debut double EP was released posthumously in November 2010.

Dean Stylette died on 17 August 2026.

== Discography ==
=== Albums ===
- Nadie Puede Vivir con un Monstruo (Cleopatra; 2018; recorded 1984, previously unreleased)

=== EPs and singles ===
- Tonight / Daily Matrix 7" (New Rocker Productions; 1980)
- El Diablo en el Cuerpo / La Cabellera de Berenice 12" maxi (independent; 1984)

=== Compilations ===
- Anarchy In Mexico (independent; 1981)
- Rock Nacional 1981 (independent; 1981)
- Sound Cosmodel (Atelier Peyotl Japan; 1984)
- Size (Rock'n'Roll Circus; 1991; compilation of their two previously released singles, a session made in 1980, and the then unreleased LP Nadie Puede Vivir con un Monstruo.)
- Unisex (Dinero Rosa; 2004)
- Backup: expediente tecnopop mexicano 1980-89 (At.At; 2005)

== Documentary ==
On August 5, 2011, a feature-length documentary about Size directed by Mario Mendoza titled Nadie Puede Vivir con un Monstruo was released.
