= Gualterio =

Gualterio may refer to:

== People ==
- Walter of Albano or Gualterio of Albano (died 1101), cardinal-bishop of the Diocese of Albano, Italy, 1091–1101
- Carlo Gualterio (1613–1673), Italian Roman Catholic cardinal
- Viscount Gualterio (fl. 1705–1723), Giovanni Battista Gualterio, created Earl of Dundee in the Jacobite Peerage, 1705
- Gualterio Looser (1898–1982), Chilean botanist and engineer
- Juan Gualterio Roederer (born 1929), Italian-born American professor of physics
- Filippo Antonio Gualterio (disambiguation), more than one person of the name

== Other ==
- Gualterio family (in the past, also Gualtieri), an aristocratic family from Orvieto, Italy
- Palazzo Gualterio, a palace in Orvieto, Italy
- Gualterio, Zacatecas, a town in Zacatecas, Mexico

== See also ==
- Wouter
