= La Baronia de Rialb =

- Municipality
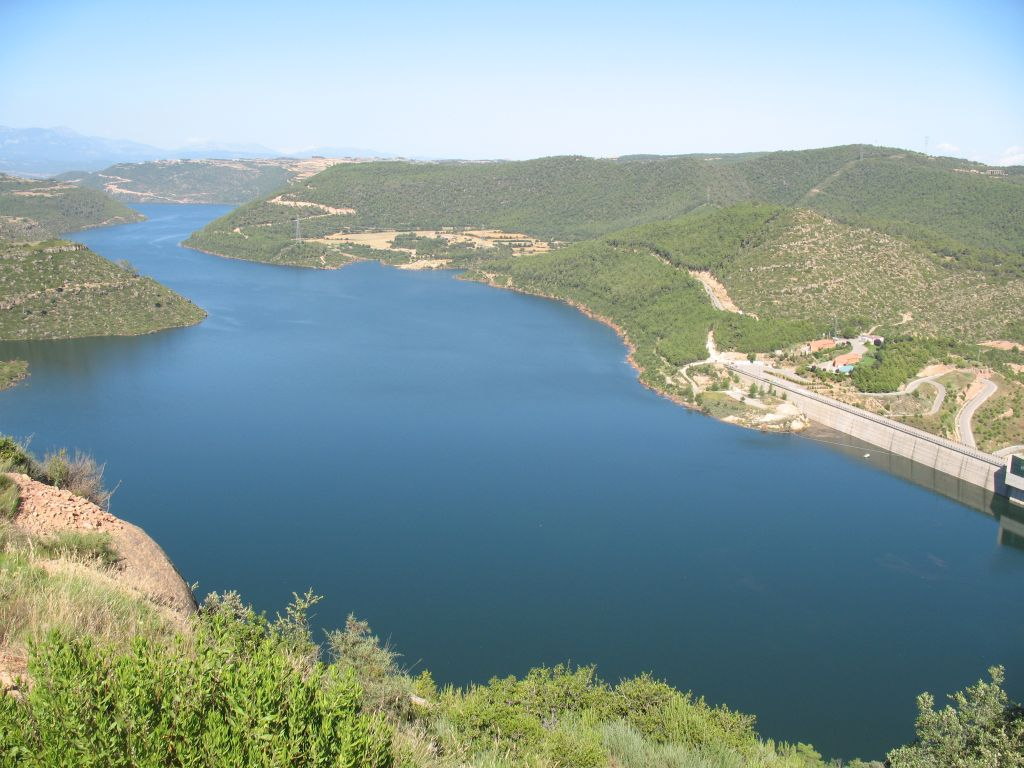
- Rialb Reservoir in La Baronia de Rialb

- Flag Coat of arms

- Location in Catalonia
- Coordinates: 41.934°N 1.197°E
- Country: Spain
- Community: Catalonia
- Province: Lleida
- Comarca: La Noguera
- Established: 1840

Government
  - Mayor: Antoni Reig Torné (2015) (CiU)

Area
  - Total: 145.1 km^{2} (56.0 sq mi)
- Elevation (AMSL): 747 m (2,451 ft)

Population (2025-01-01)
  - Total: 216
  - Density: 1.49/km^{2} (3.86/sq mi)
- Demonym(s): Rialpenc, rialpenca
- Postal code: 25747
- Area code: +34 (Spain) 973 (Province)
- Official language(s): Catalan
- Website: baroniarialb.cat

La Baronia de Rialb (Catalan pronunciation: [la βaɾoˈnia ðe riˈalp]) is a municipality in the comarca (county) of the Noguera in Catalonia, Spain. The territory is crossed by the river Rialb and the river Segre. The capital city is Gualter; before it had been La Torre de Rialb.

The municipality is formed by the union of old and tiny hamlets and parishes, which in total accounts for twenty-three Romanesque churches, which is the largest number of such churches in Catalonia.

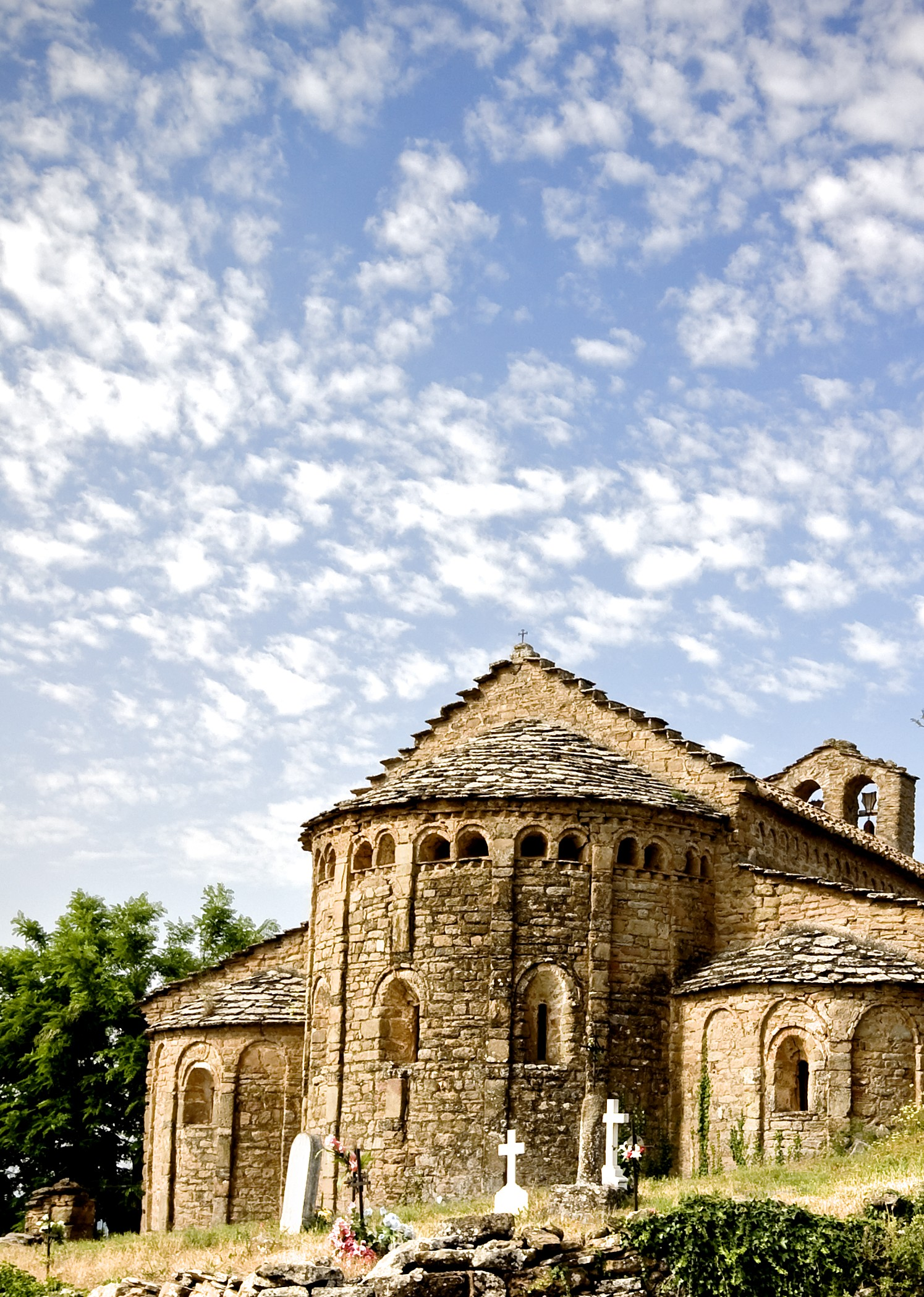
The medieval Church of Santa Maria in Palau de Rialb, La Baronia

== Demography ==
It has a population of 216 (register office, 2025).

1787	1857	1877	1887	1900	1920	1940	1960	1981	1998	2004	2009
514	1,665	1,243	1,250	1,244	1,066	839	655	298	247	279	276

== Government ==
=== List of mayors of La Baronia de Rialb ===
Period	Mayor	Party
1979-1983	Josep Serra i Bosch	UCD
1983-1987	Josep Serra i Bosch	CiU
1987-1991	Josep Serra i Bosch	CiU
1991-1995	Miquel Gabernet i Bernaus (1991–1992) Pere Prat i Torra (1992–1995)	CiU
1995-1999	Pere Prat i Torra	CiU
1999-2003	Pere Prat i Torra	CiU
2003-2007	Pere Prat i Torra	CiU
2007-2011	Pere Prat i Torra	CiU
2011-	Pere Prat i Torra	CiU

== Economy ==
The agricultural sector what draws the most numbers of jobs in La Baronia. A country with irrigated, highly arable lands, with a level of approximately 400 m to over 800 m altitude of usable land is suitable for a wide variety of crops. However, since a few years ago, the tourism sector is becoming the economic boost that the valley needed. In fact, there are currently available a two dozen agritourist establishments.

== Main sights ==
=== Nature and sport ===
- Rialb reservoir – the biggest dam in Catalonia.
- Forat de Bulí – a unique ravine in the river Rialb. It is suitable for extreme sports like canyoning.
- Alzinera de Cal Penjat – a hundred-year-old oak in El Puig de Rialb.
- GR 1 – a long-distance footpath that crosses the north of La Baronia.
- Pallerols-Andorra Way – a route suitable for hiking that starts in La Baronia and finishes in Andorra.

=== Architecture ===
- Santa Maria de Gualter – a former Benedictine monastery in Gualter.
- Santa Maria de Palau de Rialb – a Romanesque church built between the 11th and 13th centuries.
- Dolmen of Sols de Riu – a megalithic tomb located near the Rialb reservoir, in La Torre de Rialb.
