= Batis =

Batis may refer to:

- Batis (plant), a genus of flowering, salt-tolerant plants
- Batis (bird), a genus of birds in the wattle-eye family
- Batis (commander), an ancient military commander
- Batis (lens), a series of full-frame Zeiss lenses for Sony's E-mount
- Batis of Lampsacus, an Epicurean philosopher
- Batis an invalid genus of moths
