= Walt =

Walt is a masculine given name, generally a short form of Walter, and occasionally a surname. Notable people with the name include:

== People ==
=== Given name ===
- Walt Anderson (American football) (born 1952), American football official
- Walt Arfons (1916–2013), American drag racer and competition land speed record racer
- Walt Bellamy (1939–2013), American National Basketball Association player, two-time Basketball Hall of Fame inductee
- Walt Bellamy (ice hockey) (1881-1941), Canadian hockey player
- Walter Blackman (born 1965/1966), American member of the Arizona House of Representatives
- Walt Bowyer (born 1960), American National Football League player
- Walt Brown (politician) (born 1926), American politician
- Walt Clago (1899–1955), American football player
- Walt Conley (1929–2003), American singer
- Walt Corey (1938–2022), American National Football League player
- Walt Disney (1901–1966), American film producer, director, screenwriter, voice actor, animator, entrepreneur and philanthropist
- Walt Dropo (1923–2010), American Major League Baseball and college basketball player
- Walt Frazier (born 1945), American National Basketball Association player, member of the Basketball Hall of Fame
- Walt Handelsman (born 1956), American editorial cartoonist, twice winner of the Pulitzer Prize
- Walt Harris (coach) (born 1946), American college football player and coach and National Football League coach
- Walt Harris (cornerback) (born 1974), American National Football League player
- Walt Hazzard (1942-2011), American college and National Basketball Association player and college basketball coach
- Walt Housman (born 1962), American football player
- Walt Jocketty (1951–2025), American baseball executive
- Walt Kellner (1929–2006), American baseball player
- Walt Kiesling (1903–1962), American Hall-of-Fame National Football League player and coach
- Walt Kelly (1913–1973), American cartoonist best known for the comic strip Pogo
- Walt Koken (born 1946), American claw-hammer banjo player, fiddler, and singer
- Walt Kowalczyk (1935–2018), American college football and National Football League player
- Walt Lamb (1920–1991), American football player
- Walt Lemon Jr. (born 1992), American basketball player in the Israel Basketball Premier League
- Walt Nauta (born 1982/83), American political aide
- Walt Peacosh (1935–2017), Canadian ice hockey player
- Walt Radzick (1935-2005), Canadian Football League player
- Walt Schmetzer (born 1967), American soccer player
- Walt Secord (born 1964), Australian politician
- Walt Simonson (born 1946), American comic book writer and artist
- Walt Singer (1911-1992), American football player
- Walt Szczerbiak (born 1949), American basketball player
- Walt Szot (1920-1981), American National Football League player
- Walt Tauscher (1901–1992), American baseball player
- Walt Tkaczuk (born 1947), Canadian ice hockey player
- Walt Tomenga (born 1946), American politician
- Walt Torrence (1936/1937–1969), American basketball player
- Walt Uzdavinis (1911-1988), American football player
- Walt Weiss (born 1963), American Major League Baseball player and manager
- Walt Whitman (1819-1892), American poet, essayist, journalist, and humanist
- Walt Zirinsky (1920-2001), American football player

=== Surname ===
- Lewis William Walt (1913–1989), United States Marine Corps four-star general
- Martin Walt, professor of electrical engineering at Stanford University, father of Stephen Walt
- Sherman Walt (1923–1989), American bassoonist
- Stephen Walt (born 1955), American professor of international affairs

== Fictional characters ==
- Walt Boggis, a main antagonist of Fantastic Mr. Fox
- Walt Lloyd, on the television series Lost
- Walt Longmire, on the television series Longmire
- Walt Stone, from the series The Kane Chronicles
- Walt Wallet, in the newspaper comic strip Gasoline Alley

== See also ==
- Van der Walt, a list of people with the surname
