= Johann Walther =

Johann Walther may refer to:

- Johann Walter (1495–1570), collaborator of Martin Luther in the Reformation
- Johann Jakob Walther (artist) (1604–1677) Strasbourg painter
- Johann Jakob Walther (composer) (1650–1704), German violinist and composer
- Johann Gottfried Walther (1684–1748), German music theorist and composer
