= Gualtieri (disambiguation) =

Gualtieri is comune (municipality) in the Province of Reggio Emilia, Italy.

Gualtieri may also refer to:

== People ==
- Davide Gualtieri (born 1971), Sammarinese former footballer
- Giovanni dei Gualtieri (1565–1619), Roman Catholic prelate, Bishop of Sansepolcro
- Gualtieri di San Lazzaro (1904–1974), Italian author and art publisher
- Kaely Michels-Gualtieri, American trapeze artist
- Niccolò Gualtieri (1688–1744), Italian doctor and malacologist
- Paolo Rocco Gualtieri (born 1961), Italian prelate of the Catholic Church
- Robert A. "Bob" Gualtieri (born 1961), American law enforcement officer, lawyer and politician
- Roberto Gualtieri (born 1966), Italian socialist politician
- Ulisse Gualtieri (born 1941), Italian former footballer

== Other ==
- Gualtieri Sicaminò, comune (municipality) in the Metropolitan City of Messina in the Italian region Sicily
- Paulie Gualtieri, fictional character played by Tony Sirico on the HBO series The Sopranos
