= Santa Maria, Gualter =

Romanesque Benedictine monastery in Catalonia, Spain

Coordinates: 41°55′41″N 1°11′54″E

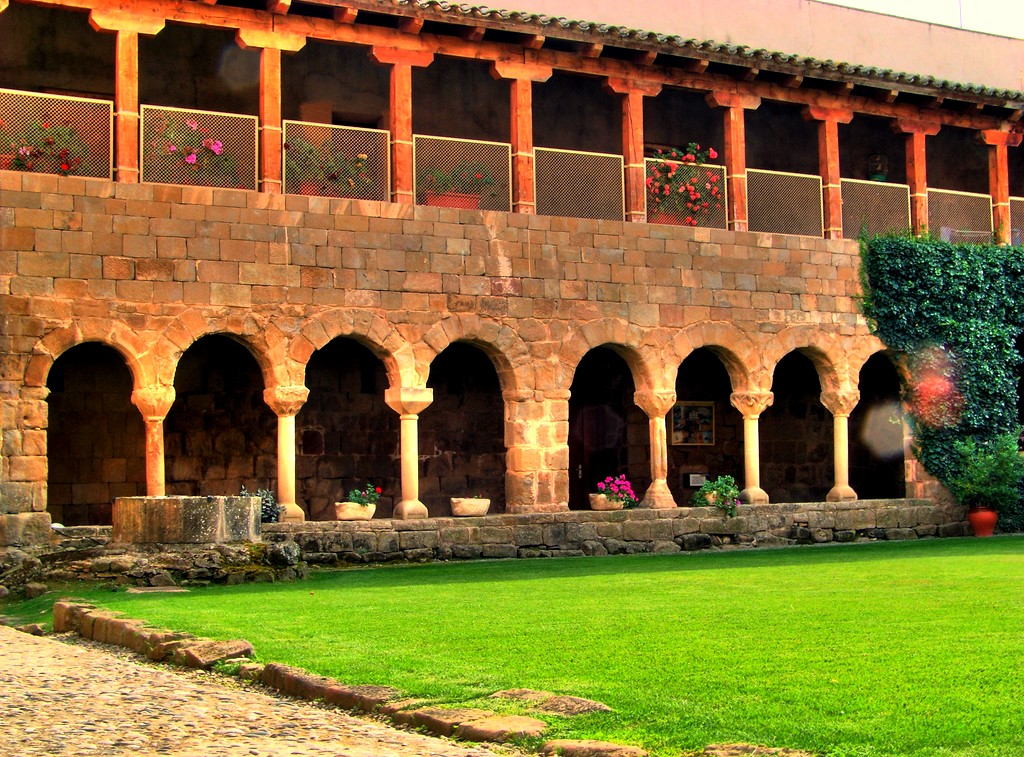
Santa Maria de Gualter

Santa Maria de Gualter is a Romanesque Benedictine monastery near the village of Gualter in the municipality of La Baronia de Rialb, Catalonia, Spain.

The village of Gualter was ceded to the monastery of Santa María de Ripoll by Count Wilfred the Hairy, which would have taken place before 890. In 1079 it was owned by Ermengol IV, Count of Urgell. The first attempts were made at building the monastery from 1118, when a brotherhood of clergy and laity was created to raise the monastery, which was consecrated in 1207. The Counts of Urgell, especially Ermengol VIII, Count of Urgell, continued to favour the monastery. Pope Clement VIII abolished the monastery in 1593, after which it became a simple parish church. It fell into ruin but has been rehabilitated.
