= Valtteri =

Valtteri is a forename. It is the Finnish form of Walter. Notable people with the name include:

- Valtteri Bottas (born 1989), Finnish Formula One driver
- Valtteri Filppula (born 1984), Finnish ice hockey forward
- Valtteri Hietanen (born 1992), Finnish ice hockey player
- Valtteri Hotakainen (born 1990), Finnish ice hockey player
- Valtteri Järviluoma (born 1993), Finnish ice hockey player
- Valtteri Jokinen, Finnish judoka
- Valtteri Karnaranta (born 2002), Finnish ice hockey player
- Valtteri Kemiläinen (born 1991), Finnish ice hockey player
- Valtteri Moren (born 1991), Finnish footballer
- Valtteri Laurell Pöyhönen (born 1978), Finnish jazz guitarist and bandleader
- Valtteri Parikka (born 1994), Finnish ice hockey player
- Valtteri Pihlajamäki (born 1996), Finnish ice hockey player
- Valtteri Puustinen (born 1999), Finnish ice hockey player
- Valtteri Vesiaho (born 1999), Finnish footballer
- Valtteri Viljanen (born 1994), Finnish ice hockey player
- Valtteri Virkkunen (born 1991), Finnish ice hockey player
