= Gualter =

Gualter is a Portuguese name corresponding to the English name Walter. Notable people with the given name include:

- Gualter Bilro, Portuguese footballer
- Gualter Salles, Brazilian racecar driver

== Surname ==
- Will Gualter, New Zealand rugby player

== See also ==
- Gualtieri (disambiguation)
- Rudolf Gwalther
- Santa Maria, Gualter
