= Valters =

Valters is a Latvian surname (feminine form: Valtere) and a masculine given name. Notable people with the name include:

- Elza Valtere, legal name of Aspazija (1865–1943), Latvian poet and playwright, after her marriage with Wilhelm Max Valter
- Kristaps Valters (born 1981), Latvian basketball player
- Miķelis Valters (1874–1968), Latvian politician, diplomat and writer
- Sandis Valters (born 1978), Latvian basketball player
- Valdis Valters (born 1957), Latvian basketball player
- Valters Āboliņš (born 1985), Latvian orienteer
- Valters Frīdenbergs (1987–2018), Latvian musician, singer and TV-presenter
- Valters Nollendorfs, board chair of the Museum of the Occupation of Latvia and a professor emeritus of German language and literature at the University of Wisconsin–Madison

== See also ==
- Valter (disambiguation)
