= Siege of Gaza (332 BC) =

Part of the Wars of Alexander the Great

- Part of the Wars of Alexander the Great
Date	October 332 BC
Location	Gaza, Persian Egypt (modern-day Gaza Strip) 31°31′N 34°27′E
Result	Macedonian victory
Territorial changes	Macedonian army captures Gaza, securing access to the Egyptian mainland

Belligerents
Macedon; Hellenic League	Achaemenid Empire; Arab mercenaries

Commanders and leaders
Alexander the Great (WIA); Hephaestion	Batis (executed)

Strength
45,000	15,000

Casualties and losses
10,000	11,000
- Location of the siege in Western Asia

Alexander the Great
current battle

The siege of Gaza, as part of the Wars of Alexander the Great, took place in October of 332 BC. Resulting in a victory for Macedon, it ended the 31st Dynasty of Egypt, which functioned as a satrapy under the Achaemenid Persian Empire.

Alexander succeeded in breaching the walls of Gaza by utilizing the engines that he had employed earlier that year, during the siege of Tyre brought by Hephaestion. Following three unsuccessful assaults, the Macedonian army was able to storm and take the Gazan stronghold.

Batis, the military commander of Gaza's fortress, expected to hold the city as well as the rest of Egypt in complete subjection until the raising of another army by Persian king Darius III; confronting Alexander at Gaza was crucial to denying the Macedonians a route into the Egyptian mainland. The fortress was located on an eminence, on the edge of a desert from which the surrounding area could be easily controlled, including the main road from Assyria to Egypt. The city, over 18 metres (60 ft) high, was traditionally employed to control the surrounding area, which, even then, was a hotbed of dissent. Batis was aware that Alexander was leading his army southward after successfully conquering Tyre, and therefore provisioned Gaza for a long siege by the Macedonian army. It is also likely that he was aware of Alexander's intention to secure absolute control over the Mediterranean coast before mounting an invasion of the Persian mainland.

First stage of the siege

Second stage of the siege

== Siege ==
Upon arriving, Alexander camped near the southern side of the city and deemed the southern walls as the weakest. It is alleged that the mounds were built quickly, despite the engineers' belief they could not be completed due to the nature of Gaza's fortifications.

One day during the siege, the Gazans made a sortie against enemy siege equipment constructed on site, and Alexander led his shield bearing guards into counterattack. Alexander's shoulder was injured in the attempt. According to Arrian, the rest of the mound was completed shortly after, around the whole of Gaza. At some undefined period after this, the siege equipment from Tyre arrived, and was put into use also. It was after this that major sections of the wall were broken by the Macedonians. After three attempts to enter the city, the Macedonians finally entered the city. The Gazans fought bitterly; at one point, an Arab mercenary pretended to surrender and after being taken to the Macedonian camp, attacked Alexander who suffered a minor injury before the Arab was struck down.

== Consequences of the siege ==
Batis refused to surrender to Alexander. When Gaza was taken, the male population was put to the sword and the women and children were sold into slavery. In the battle, there were 10,000 Gazaean casualties.

According to the Roman historian Quintus Curtius Rufus, Batis was killed by Alexander in imitation of Achilles' treatment of the fallen Hector: A rope was forced through Batis's ankles, probably between the ankle bone and the Achilles tendon, and Batis was dragged alive by chariot beneath the walls of the city until he died. Alexander, who admired courage in his enemies and might have been inclined to show mercy to the brave Persian general, was infuriated at Batis's refusal to kneel and by the enemy commander's haughty silence and contemptuous manner.

As a result of the siege, Alexander was allowed to proceed south into Egypt securely, without his line of communications being threatened from the North by Batis from Gaza.
