= Batis (commander) =

Governor of Gaza in the Achaemenid Empire

Batis (also Baitis, Betis and also Babemesis; died 332 BC) was the governor of the city of Gaza in the Achaemenid Empire, and commander of its military forces, and an opponent of Alexander the Great during his eastern campaigns.

He was brutally executed following his capture by Alexander's Macedonian forces following their lengthy siege on Gaza throughout which Batis held and defended the city that connected the only road between the then satrapy of Egypt and the rest of the empire, thus blocking Alexander from entering that province.

== Background ==
Gaza was a wealthy fortified port city located on a high tell, with special tax exempt status and a certain degree of autonomy, on the fringes of the Persian satrapy of Eber-Nari at the time of Achaemenid rule over much of Syria and Palestine. Batis was its governor and the commander of its defenses. Settled and nomadic Arabs intermingled with people described by Herodotus a century earlier as the "Syrians of Palestine". Gaza had long been a vital export station for the incense trade from South Arabia and salts and minerals from the Dead Sea, a trade run by Arab tribal federations, like the Qedarites and Nabataeans, who also formed the bulk of the city's fighting force, along with a Persian garrison, both of which were under Batis' command.

Batis is described in some contemporary sources as a eunuch, though the only original source for this description is Arrian, who otherwise provides scant biographical detail. William Woodthorpe Tarn attributes this to a faulty extrapolation of some inferences in the account of Hegesias of Magnesia on Batis' appearance (see below). The description is not repeated by any other Hellenistic or Classical sources, neither Josephus nor Quintus Curtius Rufus, who recorded some details of his leadership in the Gaza resistance to Alexander. In Rufus' account, which draws on earlier sources (mentioned below), he wrote of Batis' ardent loyalty to Darius III, the sovereign of the Achaemenid empire, indicating that Batis was acting under the King's orders.

== The siege ==
The city's granary and water supplies were fully stocked by Batis and its walled fortifications and imposing position atop a steep mound bestowed confidence that it could withstand siege and not be breached; and so, despite having seen Alexander's forces overtake Tyre - the only other city along the Syrian coast to resist his advances - after a lengthy seven month siege, Batis rejected entreaties to surrender without a fight. Reports on how long before a few of Alexander's soldiers managed to scale the walls vary from a couple of months to several; in order to overcome Gaza's defenses Alexander oversaw a massive engineering campaign, with digging works undertaken beneath the foundations supporting the city's walls, while also constructing a berm up to a height of 250 feet and a width of 1,200 feet.

Once completed, the walls of Gaza were accessible to battering with rams, and were breached, falling one after another, eventually providing the whole of Alexander's army access to enter. The people of Gaza and the men under Batis' command defending the city remained steadfast, but were finally overwhelmed; the men all killed while fighting without abandoning their positions, or massacred shortly after the city was fully taken. Hegesias of Magnesia set the number of dead as a result to between 4,000-6,000, while Rufus sets it as 10,000, the same number for those reportedly killed in Tyre. He gives no figure for the number of Macedonian dead, noting only that it was "not bloodless" for them too.

== Capture, death and aftermath ==
Even after defeat, Batis refused to submit to the Macedonians or to acknowledge Alexander as the new King of Asia, which enraged Alexander. Batis was already wounded when captured. The most grotesque account of how he was subsequently killed originates in Hegesias's work The Life of Alexander, who wrote that "a bronze ring" was inserted through his legs and attached to a chariot that dragged him around his city walls, naked, until he perished, claiming his cries of gibberish as he writhed in pain provoked laughter. Rufus reproduced a variation of this version, attaching the piercing of Batis's Achilles tendon with how Hector had been treated by Alexander's hero Achilles, while noting that Hector had already been dead at the time of his dragging.

Dionysius of Halicarnassus provides a sparser description, saying only that Batis was tied alive to the back of chariot which was driven full speed, not around the city, killing him. He quoted Hegesias' derogatory and sensational description of events to criticize it, taking issue with his description of Batis' appearance and demeanor, which had characterized him as black and obese, resembling "a Babylonian animal". Dionysus wrote that Batis was "a man held in honor on account of his fortune and good looks." As for the women and children of Gaza, after the killing of their men and defender, Alexander had them all sold into slavery, and repopulated Gaza by installing the inhabitants of neighbouring villages within it, ensuring a sense of beholdenness to him.

Alexander's cruel treatment of Batis and of the inhabitants of Gaza (and Tyre) is characterized as atypical, and attributed to his frustration over the prolonged resistance they put forward, delaying his entry into the primary target, Egypt. He himself was also twice wounded by Batis' forces during their defense of the besieged city. The exceptional refusal of Batis and Gaza (and Tyre) to capitulate to Alexander while all others in the "Syrian and Palestinian hinterland" surrendered without a fight is attributed variously by historians to their rich ancient history, cosmopolitan culture, and "high political consciousness".

"Dead men tell no tales, and the defeated have no voice," wrote Waldemar Heckel while reflecting on the lack of knowledge of the precise details of Batis' life, and his perspective on the battle that cost him his life. Yet, Batis' valiant stand against Alexander is still recalled, investigated and pondered by historians and philosopher more than two millennia later. The perception of Alexander himself marked by his treatment of this worthy adversary who never wavered in his defense of his city, nor loyalty to his King.

== Bibliography ==
- Aharoni, Yonahan (2006) [2003]. "1. Ancient Times (E. The Hellenistic Period)". In Ahituv, Shmuel; Ball, Barbara Laurel (eds.). The Jewish People: An Illustrated History. New York City, United States: Continuum. p. 57. ISBN 9780826418869 – via Google Books.
- Atkinson, J.E. (2024). A Commentary on Q. Curtius Rufus' Historiae Alexandri Magni: Books 3 and 4. Brill.
- Dodge, Theodore Ayrault (1996) [1890]. "XXV. Gaza and Egypt. September, B.C. 332, to Spring B.C. 331". Alexander: A History of the Origin and Growth of the Art of War from the Earliest Times to the Battle of Ipsus, B.C. 301, with a Detailed Account of the Campaigns of the Great Macedonian. Vol. 1. New York City, United States: Da Capo Press. ISBN 0306806908. LCCN 95045156 – via Archive.org.
- Ferguson, Michael P.; Worthington, Ian (2023), "Chapter 7: Alexander in Persia 2: Mission Accomplished?", The Military Legacy of Alexander the Great: Lessons for the Information Age, Taylor & Francis
- Graf, David Franck (1 January 2003). Sartre, Maurice (ed.). "Arabs in Syria: Demography and epigraphy". Topoi. La Syrie hellénistique. 13 (Suppl. 4). Lyon, France: Société des Amis de la bibliothèque Salomon-Reinach/Maison de l'Orient et de la Méditerranée Jean Pouilloux (Fédération de recherche sur les sociétés anciennes): 310–340. ISSN 2496-7114 – via Persée.
- Judah Between East and West: The Transition from Persian to Greek Rule (ca. 400-200 BCE). Bloomsbury Academic. 2013.
- Hamilton, J.R. (1 October 1988). Paschoud, François; Raaflaub, Kurt; Temporini, Hildegard; Walser, Gerold (eds.). "The Date of Quintus Curtius Rufus". Historia: Zeitschrift für Alte Geschichte. 37 (4). Stuttgart, Germany: Franz Steiner Verlag Wiesbaden GmbH: 445–456. ISSN 0018-2311. JSTOR 4436073.
- Heckel, Waldemar (2020). the Path of Conquest: Resistance to Alexander the Great. Oxford University Press.
- Ionescu, Dan Tudor (2025), ALEXANDER THE GREAT IN BACTRIA AND INDIA NARRATIVE: SOURCES AND HISTORICAL GEOGRAPHY, Bucharest University Press
- Kuhrt, Amélie (2013), The Persian Empire: A Corpus of Sources from the Achaemenid Period
- Rufus, Quintus Curtius; et al. (Foreword by Johann Freinsheim) (1714). "Chapter VI". Histories of Alexander the Great. Vol. I. Translated by John Digby. London, United Kingdom: W.B. for Bernard Lintott. p. 214 – via Archive.org.
- Sutcliffe, Adam; Sturdy, John; Karp, Jonathan; Finkelstein, Louis; Hart, Mitchell B.; Katz, Steven T.; Michels, Tony; Davies, William David; Horbury, William, eds. (1984), The Cambridge History of Judaism: Volume 2, The Hellenistic Age, Cambridge University Press
- Tarn, William Woodthorpe (1979), Alexander the Great: Volume 2, Sources and Studies, Cambridge University Press
- Tumans, Harrijs (2019). Yu, Andrey; Beousov, Mikhail S. (eds.). "Alexander the Great and Three Examples of Upholding Mythological Tradition". Vestnik of Saint Petersburg University. History. 64 (4). St. Petersburg, Russia: St. Petersburg State University Academic Press: 1301–1316. doi:10.21638/11701/spbu02.2019.409. ISSN 1812-9323. S2CID 214090309 – via DSpace at Saint Petersburg State University.
- Yenne, Bill (2010). "Chapter 6: From Gaza to Alexandria". Alexander the Great: Lessons from History's Undefeated General. St. Martin's Press.
