= Valtinho =

Valtinho may refer to:

- Valtinho (footballer, born 1948), Valter Alves da Silva, Brazilian football defender
- Valtinho (footballer, born 1956), Valter Lucca Lateri, Brazilian football attacking midfielder
- Valtinho da Silva (born 1977), Brazilian basketball player

== See also ==
- Valter
