= Hegesias of Magnesia =

Ancient Greek historian and rhetorician

Hegesias of Magnesia (Ancient Greek: Ἡγησίας ὁ Μάγνης, romanized: Hēgēsias ho Magnēs) was an Ancient Greek historian and rhetorician who flourished about 300 BC. Strabo (xiv. 648) speaks of him as the founder of the florid Asiatic style of composition.

Agatharchides, Dionysius of Halicarnassus (De compositione verborum 18) and Cicero all speak of him in disparaging terms, although Varro seems to have approved of his work. He professed to imitate the simplest style of Lysias, avoiding long periods, and expressing himself in short, jerky sentences, without modulation or finish. His vulgar affectation and bombast made his writings a mere caricature of the old Attic. Dionysius describes his composition as tinselled, ignoble and effeminate. According to Gualtiero Calboli, Hegesias and his fellow Asiatics rejected Attic examples (and in particular the example of Thucydides) in favor of a return to "the models of Ionic and sophistic prose."

It is generally supposed, from the fragment quoted as a specimen by Dionysius (and cf. Plutarch, Life of Alexander 3), that Hegesias is to be classed among the writers of lives of Alexander the Great. This fragment describes the treatment of Gaza and its inhabitants by Alexander after its conquest, but it is possible that it is only part of an epideictic or show speech, not of an historical work. This view is supported by a remark of Agatharchides in Photius (cod. 250) that the only aim of Hegesias was to exhibit his skill in describing sensational events.
