= The Five Senses (film) =

- Directed by: Jeremy Podeswa
- Written by: Jeremy Podeswa
- Produced by: Camelia Frieberg; Jeremy Podeswa
- Starring: Mary-Louise Parker; Pascale Bussières; Richard Clarkin; Brendan Fletcher; Marco Leonardi; Nadia Litz; Daniel MacIvor; Molly Parker; Gabrielle Rose; Tara Rosling; Philippe Volter
- Cinematography: Gregory Middleton
- Edited by: Wiebke Von Carolsfeld
- Music by: Alexina Louie; Alex Pauk
- Distributed by: Alliance Atlantis Releasing
- Release date: May 18, 1999 (Cannes Film Festival)
- Running time: 106 minutes
- Country: Canada
- Languages: English; French; Italian

The Five Senses is a 1999 Canadian drama film directed, written and produced by Jeremy Podeswa.

The film premiered in the Directors' Fortnight program at the 1999 Cannes Film Festival, and had its Canadian premiere at the 1999 Toronto International Film Festival.

== Plot ==
The Five Senses is about interconnected stories linked by a building which examine situations involving the five senses. Touch is represented by Ruth Seraph, a massage therapist who is treating Anna Miller. Ruth's daughter Rachel accidentally loses Anna's pre-school daughter, Amy Lee, in the park, when Rachel is distracted by the sight of a couple making love in the woods. Rachel meets a voyeur named Rupert (vision), and they become friends as fellow outsiders while he teaches her the pleasure of observing others. They eventually go to one of Rachel's hiding places, where she has him dress like a woman.

Meanwhile, Ruth tries to help Anna cope with the disappearance of Amy Lee and stays the night at her home. Robert, a professional housecleaner, has an acute sense of smell, and seeks out the people he used to see to absorb their scents and see if he can smell any feeling for him or why they stopped caring for him. His professional clients include his friends Raymond and Rebecca, who makes perfume. Robert's friend Rona, a cake maker, has lost her sense of taste, and has romantic problems after Roberto, whom she met on a vacation in Italy, arrives. Dr. Richard Jacob, an older optometrist, is losing his hearing and wants to remember all the sounds before he goes deaf. He had separated from his wife Sylvie, but later connects to a woman named Gail (Pascale Bussières) who helps him to cope and feel better about himself. In the end, Amy Lee is found, and Ruth and Rachel are reconciled.

== Cast ==
- Mary-Louise Parker - Rona
- Gabrielle Rose - Ruth Seraph
- Molly Parker - Anna Miller
- Daniel MacIvor - Robert
- Philippe Volter - Dr. Richard Jacob
- Nadia Litz - Rachel Seraph
- Brendan Fletcher - Rupert
- Marco Leonardi - Roberto
- Pascale Bussières - Gail
- Paul Soles - Mr. Bernstein
- Tara Rosling - Rebecca
- Richard Clarkin - Raymond
- Elize Frances Stolk - Amy Lee Miller

== Critical response ==
For the CanWest News Service, Brendan Kelly wrote that "It sounds pretentious, and sometimes it is. But mostly it isn't, which is the real surprise in this often funny, understated ensemble piece that showcases some of the best acting in a Canadian film in the last year. The talented cast helps take this overly schematic script and make it feel real, with nuanced performances. The film works because you quickly forget about the follow-the-senses design and simply follow the stories of these intriguing characters seeking human companionship."

Katrina Onstad of the National Post wrote that "The Five Senses has the kind of trick conceit that could have been a leaden exercise in showmanship were it not for the meticulous control of director Jeremy Podeswa", and that "a lyrical touch saves The Five Senses from bogging down in its own sadness (lost child equals weepy movie), and there are some much needed, very funny moments, particularly from Parker's neurotic cake baker."

On the review aggregator website Rotten Tomatoes, 74% of 34 critics' reviews are positive, with an average rating of 6.8/10. Metacritic, which uses a weighted average, assigned the film a score of 56 out of 100, based on 30 critics, indicating "mixed or average" reviews.

== Awards ==
Award	Date of ceremony	Category	Recipient(s)	Result	Ref(s)
Toronto International Film Festival	1999	Best Canadian Film	The Five Senses	Won	
Genie Awards	2000	Best Picture	Jeremy Podeswa, Camelia Frieberg	Nominated	
Genie Awards	2000	Best Director	Jeremy Podeswa	Won	
Genie Awards	2000	Best Actor	Daniel MacIvor	Nominated	
Genie Awards	2000	Best Actress	Mary-Louise Parker	Nominated	
Genie Awards	2000	Best Original Screenplay	Jeremy Podeswa	Nominated	
Genie Awards	2000	Best Art Direction/Production Design	Taavo Soodor, Darryl Dennis Deegan, Erica Milo	Nominated	
Genie Awards	2000	Best Cinematography	Gregory Middleton	Nominated	
Genie Awards	2000	Best Overall Sound	Philip Norman Stall, Martin Lee, Lou Solakofski	Nominated	
Genie Awards	2000	Best Sound Editing	Janice Ierulli, Terry Burke, Ed Douglas, Garrett Kerr, Angie Pajek	Nominated	
