= Gualtiero =

Gualtiero is the name of:

- Gualtiero Bassetti (born 1942), Italian prelate
- Gualtiero Calboli (1932–2026), Italian classicist and linguist
- Gualtiero De Angelis (1899–1980), Italian actor and voice actor
- Gualtiero Driussi (1920–1996), Italian politician and syndicalist
- Gualtiero Giori (1913–1992), Italian security printer and inventor
- Gualtiero Jacopetti (1919–2011), Italian documentary film director
- Gualtiero Marchesi (1930–2017), Italian chef
- Gualtiero Negrini (born 1961), American conductor, filmmaker, singer, actor, director and vocal coach
- Gualtiero Piccinini (born 1970), Italian-American philosopher
- Gualtiero Tumiati (1876–1971), Italian actor and stage director
- Gualtiero Zanolini, volunteer member of the World Scout Committee

== See also ==
- Walter of Palearia (died 1229 or 1231), chancellor of the Kingdom of Sicily
