= Walter E. Zink =

United States Army general

Walter E. Zink II
- Allegiance: United States
- Branch: United States Army
- Rank: Major general
- Commands: Operational Command Post (OCP) 1, United States Army North; Joint Task Force (Homeland Defense and Civil Support Operations)
- Other work: Counsel to Baylor Evnen law firm Member of the Army Reserve Forces Policy Committee

Walter E. Zink II is a major general in the United States Army. He is the current commander of Operational Command Post (OCP) 1, United States Army North. He commands the OCP as a task force in response to consequence management operations. He also commands a Joint Task Force, leading and coordinating air, ground, and naval forces in homeland defense and civil support operations. He previously served as the deputy commanding general of the Fifth US Army.

Major General Zink is a member of the Army Reserve Forces Policy Committee. As a member he identifies, considers, and addresses reserve component force structure, resourcing, manning, and mobilization issues for the Secretary of the Army.

On May 5, 2009, he was elected to the Lincoln Airport Authority. In January 2015, he announced that he would not be seeking re-election.

Zink serves as of counsel to the law firm Baylor Evnen.
