= Gauthier =

Gauthier (French: [ɡotje]) is a French name of Germanic origin, corresponding to the English given name Walter.

== People with the given name ==
- Gauthier de Costes, seigneur de la Calprenède
- Gauthier de Brienne, Counts Walter III of Brienne, Walter IV of Brienne, Walter V of Brienne Walter VI of Brienne
- Gaultier Tirel, ostensible killer of William II of England
- Gauthier of Pontoise, saint
- Gotye, Belgian-Australian multi-instrumentalist
- Gauthier Grumier, French left-handed épée fencer
- Gauthier Boccard, Belgian professional field hockey player
- Gauthier Hein, French professional footballer

== People with the surname ==
- Albert Gauthier de Clagny (1853–1927), French politician
- Albert Gautier Vignal French-Monegasque fencer and diplomat
- Bernard Gauthier (1924–2018), French cyclist
- Cathy Gauthier, Canadian curler
- Charles-Arthur Gauthier, Canadian politician
- Claude Gauthier (singer), French-Canadian singer-songwriter
- Cutter Gauthier, American ice hockey player
- Dan Gauthier, American actor
- Daniel Gauthier, Canadian ice hockey player
- David Gauthier, Canadian-American philosopher
- Denis Gauthier, Canadian ice hockey player
- Élodie Murphy-Gauthier, Quebec politician
- Éric Gauthier (writer), Canadian science fiction writer
- Eric Gauthier (dancer), Canadian-born dancer, choreographer and musician
- Eva Gauthier (1885-1958), Canadian mezzo-soprano and voice teacher
- Frédérik Gauthier, Canadian ice hockey player
- Gabe Gauthier, American ice hockey player
- Gerard Gauthier, hockey linesman
- Henri Gauthier, comte de Rigny
- Henri Gaudier-Brzeska (1891-1915), French artist and sculptor
- Jacques Gauthier, zoologist
- Jamie Gauthier, American Democratic politician
- Jean Gauthier (1937–2013), Canadian ice hockey player
- Jean Gauthier, French actor
- Jean-Bernard Gauthier de Murnan, French general
- Jean-Robert Gauthier, Canadian politician
- Juan Ignacio Gauthier, Argentine rugby union footballer
- Julien Gauthier, Canadian ice hockey player
- Kerry Gauthier, Minnesota politician
- Léo Gauthier, Canadian politician
- Marcel Gauthier, Canadian wrestler
- Marie-Madeleine Gauthier, A French Art Historian.
- Mary Gauthier (born 1962), American singer
- Michel Gauthier, Canadian politician
- Mylène Gauthier, the French-Canadian singer Mylène Farmer
- Nick Gauthier, American politician
- Paul Gauthier (theologian), French theologian
- Paule Gauthier, Canadian lawyer
- Pierre Gauthier, Canadian ice hockey executive
- Pierre Gauthier (politician), Canadian politician
- Sean Gauthier, Canadian ice hockey player
- Terry Gauthier, American politician
- Théophile Gauthier, French writer, usually Théophil Gautier
- Tyler Gauthier (born 1997), American football player
- Ursula Gauthier, French journalist
- Victor-Auguste Gauthier (1837–1911), French amateur palaeontologist.
- Pierre Gauthier (1930-2016), dit Gartier, French painter

== Places ==
- Gauthier, Ontario, Canada
- Ferme Gauthier, Algeria

== See also ==
- Gaultier (disambiguation)
- Gautier (disambiguation)
