= Valtteri Karnaranta =

Finnish ice hockey player

- Born: 19 September 2002 (age 23) Oulu, Finland
- Position: LW
- Liiga team: Ässät
- Playing career: 2021–present

Valtteri Karnaranta (born 19 September 2002) is a Finnish ice hockey player who currently plays for Hermes of the Mestis. He made his professional Liiga debut with Ässät on 17 September 2021 in a game against HPK.
