= Philippe Volter =

Belgian actor and director

- Born: Philippe Wolter; 23 March 1959; Uccle, Belgium
- Died: 13 April 2005 (aged 46); Paris, France
- Occupation: Actor

Philippe Volter (23 March 1959 – 13 April 2005) was a Belgian actor and director. Born Philippe Wolter to theatre director Claude Volter and his wife, actress Jacqueline Bir, Volter began his career in Brussels in 1985.

He made many stage and film appearances, the latter of which peaked with such arthouse films as The Music Teacher (1988), The Double Life of Véronique (1991) and Blue (1993). Other appearances include Macbeth (1987) and The Five Senses (1999). Upon his father's death in 2002, he returned to Belgium and became artistic director for the Comedy Claude Volter.

Volter committed suicide in 2005, aged 46.

== Filmography ==
Year	Title	Role	Notes
1985	De leeuw van Vlaanderen	Deschamps	
1986	Les roses de Matmata	Max	
1987	Macbeth	Macduff	
1988	The Music Teacher	Jean Nilson	
1988	Issue de secours	Alain	
1989	Les bois noirs	Gustave	
1990	Cyrano de Bergerac	Vicomte de Valvert	
1990	Trois années	Constantin Biochon	
1990	La veillée	Albert Aurier	
1991	The Double Life of Veronique	Alexandre Fabbri	
1991	A Mere Mortal (Simple mortel)	Stéphane	
1992	Aline	Michel	
1993	Three Colours: Blue	L'agent immobilier	
1994	L'affaire	René Charlet	Uncredited
1994	Dernier stade	Olivier Chardon	
1997	La nuit du destin	Inspecteur Leclerc	
1999	Tørst - Framtidens forbrytelser	Alexandre	(Episode: Amertume)
1999	The Five Senses	Dr. Richard Jacob	
2001	Posseteni ot gospoda		
2003	Resistance	Henri Daussois	
2005	Les gens honnêtes vivent en France	Bénolo	
