= Gualtiero Driussi =

Italian politician (1920–1996)

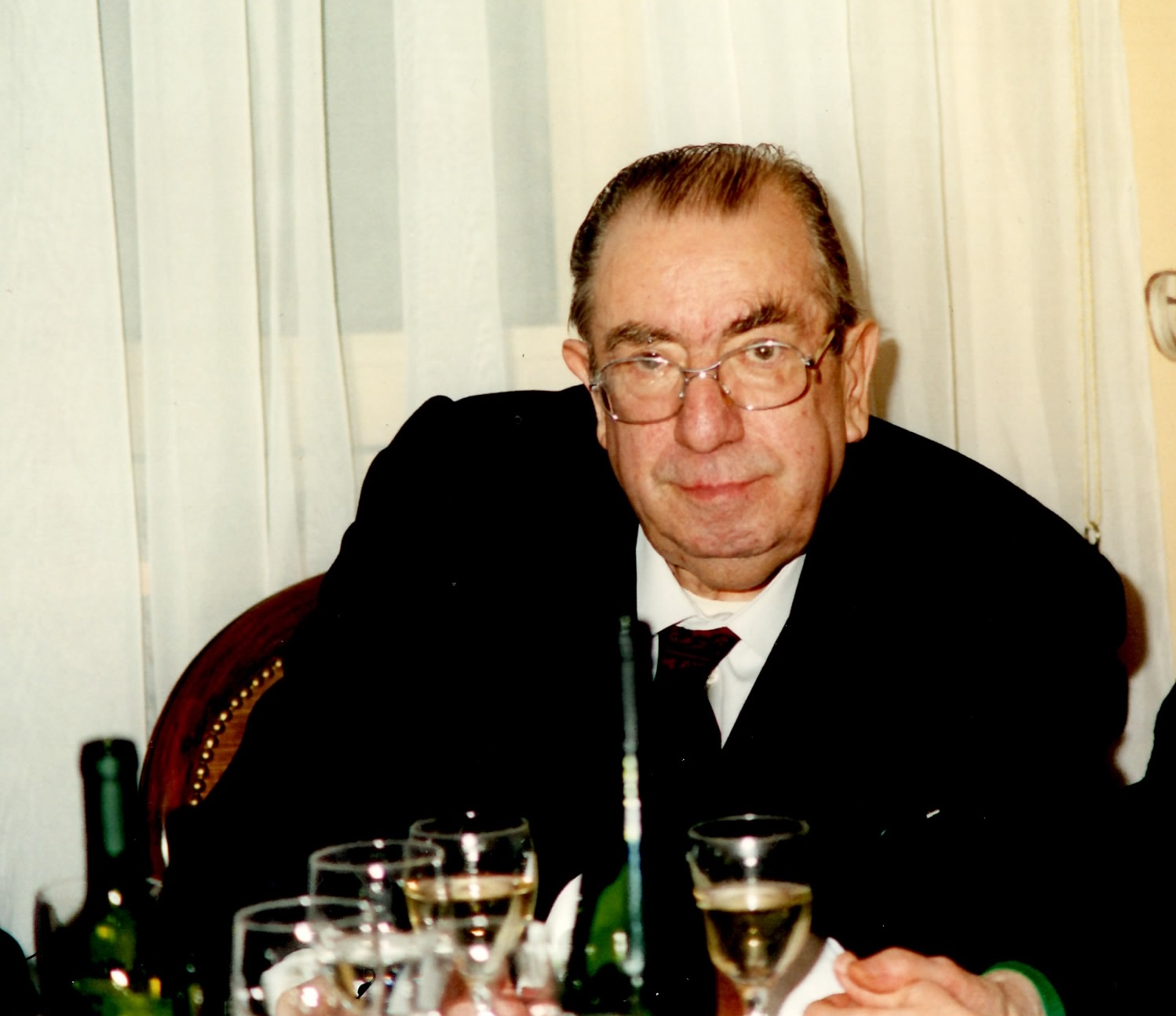

Member of the Italian Chamber of Deputies
- In office 1951–1958

Personal details
- Born: 18 October 1920 Trieste, Friuli-Venezia Giulia, Italy
- Died: 24 March 1996 (aged 75) Udine, Friuli-Venezia Giulia, Italy
- Party: Democrazia Cristiana
- Profession: Accountant entrepreneur

Gualtiero Driussi (18 October 1920 – 24 March 1996) was an Italian politician and syndicalist, member of Italy's centrist party Christian Democracy and of the Italian Chamber of Deputies and founder of the first trade union in Udine, a branch of the Italian Confederation of Workers' Trade Unions.
