= Bon Gaultier =

Bon Gaultier was a pen name assumed by the writers William Edmondstoune Aytoun and Sir Theodore Martin.

The humorous Bon Gaultier Ballads remained popular for a long time; originally contributed to a magazine, they appeared in book form in 1845.

Contents

The Broken Pitcher- a story about a Moorish woman who throws a Christian Knight down a well after stealing three kisses from her
