= Gautier (surname) =

Gautier is a French surname. Notable people with the surname include:

- Mylène Farmer (real surname: Gautier) (born 1961), French singer and songwriter
- Armand Gautier (1825–1894), French painter and lithographer
- Cyril Gautier (born 1987), French cyclist
- Dick Gautier (1931–2017), actor
- Douglas Gautier, Australian arts executive
- Émile Gautier (1853–1937), anarchist and journalist
- Eugène Gautier (1822–1878), French composer and violinist
- Jean-Alfred Gautier (1793–1881), Swiss astronomer
- Judith Gautier (1845–1917), French author, daughter of Théophile
- Léon Gautier (1832–1897), French paleographer
- Louis Gautier (1810–1884), French Bonapartist politician
- Lucien Gautier (1850–1924), Swiss theologian
- Marthe Gautier (1925–2022), French medical doctor and researcher
- Nathalie Gautier (1951–2006), French politician
- Paul Ferdinand Gautier (1842–1909), French scientific instrument maker
- Vannesa Rosales-Gautier (born 1989), Venezuelan activist and teacher
- René François Gautier (1851–1936), French politician
- Théophile Gautier (1811–1872), French author
- Victor Gautier (1824–1890), Swiss physician

== See also ==
- Gotye, Australian musician
