= Walter E. Baethgen =

Uruguayan scientist

- First day as vice-president of INIA
- Born: February 16, 1955 (age 71); Montevideo, Uruguay
- Education: Virginia Polytechnic Institute and State University
- Years active: 45
- Employer(s): Columbia University International Research Institute for Climate and Society (IRI), Columbia Climate School National Agricultural Research Institute (INIA) of Uruguay
- Honours: Nobel Peace Price with IPCC 2007 (Contributor) Morosoli de Oro 2010 (Uruguay) Member of the National Academy of Engineering (Uruguay)
- Website: https://professorsemeritus.columbia.edu/people/walter-e-baethgen

Walter Enrique Baethgen (born February 16, 1955) is a Uruguayan scientist. His research focuses on the impact of climate variability and change on the agricultural sector. Baethgen retired from Columbia University in 2026 and is now Emeritus Professor. During his tenure at Columbia University (2004-2026) Baethgen served as Senior Research Scientist and Acting Director of the International Research Institute for Climate and Society (IRI) of Columbia University's Climate School and the Vice-president of the National Agricultural Research Institute (INIA) of Uruguay.

== Biography ==
Walter Enrique Baethgen was born in Montevideo, Uruguay on February 16, 1955.

== Education and career ==
Baethgen graduated from the University of the Republic in 1979, with a Bachelor of Science degree in Agricultural Engineering. Soon after graduation, he worked on Soil and Crop Management at INIA, La Estanzuela in Colonia, Uruguay.

In 1982, Baethgen emigrated his home country to pursue an M.Sc. and Ph.D in Crop and Soil Environmental Sciencies at Virginia Polytechnic Institute and State University in the United States of America. During his time in Virginia Tech, he focused his research on soil and crop management, soil fertility and soil chemistry. His Ph.D. dissertation focused on developing a model for fertilization that supported decision-making to optimize nitrogen fertilizer application in wheat, which had an important impact in the protection of the environment and improvement of resource efficiency by obtaining higher yields, optimizing costs and reducing the risk of water contamination of the Chesapeake Bay, as well as in improving the farmers' adaptive capacity to climate variability and change.

From 1987 to 2004, Baethgen took the role of Senior Scientist in the Research and Development Division of the International Fertilizer Development Center (IFDC). In this position, he was in charge of designing, establishing and managing international research and development projects on Soil Fertility and Crop/Pasture Management by working on decision support systems for the agricultural sector. Among these projects he worked in crop simulation models, decision support systems, climate variability and change, and carbon sequestration in agriculture and forestry. While at the IFDC Baethgen worked in a research program funded by the United Nations Development Program to optimize fertilizer strategies for sustainable agriculture and environmental protection as Regional Coordinator of the program for Latin America. At the same time he worked as Scientist in the first project that focused on climate change and world food supply in 1988–1989, funded by NASA and the US Environmental Protection Agency.

Baethgen joined Columbia University in 2004 where he has played several roles. He was Senior Research Scientist at the IRI (International Research Institute for Climate and Society) of The Climate School (previously The Earth Institute) where he served as Acting Director, and where he previously held the positions of Director of the Regional and Sectoral Research Program, and Director of the Latin American Regional Program. He was also the Acting Director of the Agriculture and Food Security Center of The Earth Institute also at Columbia University. Throughout his tenure at the IRI, Baethgen established, developed and managed IRI's programs in climate-related risk assessment and risk management in agriculture and food security, health, water resources and disasters. He lectured in graduate courses for Master and PhD programs and mentored tens of doctoral students and postdoctoral candidates.

Between 2020 and 2025 Baethgen held the position of Vice-president of the Board of Directors of INIA (Uruguay's National Agricultural Research Institute) where he contributed to establish priorities for national and regional research, and for international cooperation.

In addition to his contribution in research and education programs to sustainable agricultural production systems throughout the world, Baethgen has acted as consultant and advisor for the World Bank, IADB, United Nations (UNDP, UNIDO, FAO, IAEA) and the Inter-american Institute for Agricultural Cooperation (IICA). He has also acted as consultant to governments and the private sector of several countries throughout Latin America.

== Innovations and industry impact ==
=== Baethgen Fertilization Model ===
The Baethgen fertilization model is a decision-support tool designed to optimize nitrogen fertilizer application in crops. The model uses crop growth assessment (at Z-22 and Z-30) to predict the most effective and sustainable timing and amount of nitrogen to apply, aiming to balance economic returns for farmers with environmental stewardship.

A newer version of the model incorporates real-time climate and soil data, including rainfall, temperature, and soil moisture, to simulate crop growth and nutrient requirements leading to a dynamic simulation to calculate the cost-benefit ratio of different fertilization strategies, aiding farmers to maximize yield without overusing fertilizers. Moreover, by reducing excess nitrogen application, the model minimizes nutrient runoff, which can lead to water pollution and greenhouse gas emissions.

The Baethgen fertilization model is designed for various crops and can be tailored to specific regional conditions, making it especially valuable in regions like the Southern Cone of South America, where Baethgen has focused much of his work.

=== Contribution to scientific committees and advisory groups ===
Baethgen was a member of Consultative Group on International Agricultural Research (CGIAR) Science Council from 2006 and 2008. In this role he worked on enhancing and promoting the quality, relevance and impact of CGIAR science programs, and helping to mobilize the global scientific community around the mission and goals of the CGIAR.

In 2011, Baethgen was a Distinguished Lead Scholar for the Fulbright Regional Network for Applied Research Program (NEXUS). The NEXUS program was created to establish a network of experts to advance policy-oriented research and provide a forum for best practices. As one of these experts, Walter engaged in collaborative thinking, analysis, problem-solving, multidisciplinary research.

He was also reviewer for several international research programs (NOAA, NASA, NSF, IAI and the German, Norwegian, and Austrian governments).

Since 2013, Baethgen is a Faculty Advisory Committee member for the Columbia University Global Centers of Latin America where he provides strategic advice to the Global Centers in Chile and Brazil.

He has published more than 150 scientific and technical articles.

web: https://professorsemeritus.columbia.edu/people/walter-e-baethgen

ORCID: https://orcid.org/0000-0003-2052-2052

== Awards and honors ==
Baethgen was a member of the Intergovernmental Panel on Climate Change (IPCC) team that was awarded the Nobel Peace Prize in 2007.

In 2010 Baethgen was awarded the "Morosoli de Oro" Prize for his contribution to the Uruguayan culture

== Selected publications ==
- Baethgen, W. E.; W. J. Parton; V. Rubio; R. H. Kelly; S. Lutz. 2021. Ecosystem dynamics of crop‐pasture rotations in a fifty‐year field experiment in Southern South America: Century model and field results. SSSAJ 85(2):423-437 https://doi.org/10.1002/saj2.20204
- Baethgen, W.E. and M.M. Alley. 1989. Optimizing Soil and Fertilizer Nitrogen Use for Intensively Managed Winter Wheat. II. Critical Levels and Optimum N Fertilizer Rates. Agronomy Journal, 81(120–125). https://doi.org/10.2134/agronj1989.00021962008100010022x
- Baethgen, W. E., & Alley, M. M. 1989. A manual colorimetric procedure for measuring ammonium nitrogen in soil and plant Kjeldahl digests. Communications in Soil Science and Plant Analysis, 20(9–10), 961–969. https://doi.org/10.1080/00103628909368129
- Baethgen, W.E., C.B. Christianson, and A. García Lamothe. 1995. Nitrogen fertilizer effects on growth, grain yield, and yield components of malting barley. Field Crops Research, 43:87–99. https://doi.org/10.1016/0378-4290(95)00034-N
- Baethgen, W.E. 1997. Vulnerability of the agricultural sector of Latin America to climate change. Climate Research. 9:1–7. https://doi.org/10.3354/cr009001
- Baethgen, W.E. 2010. Climate Risk Management for Adaptation to Climate Variability and Change. Crop Science, 50(2):70–76. https://doi.org/10.2135/cropsci2009.09.0526
- Baethgen, W.E. and L. Goddard. 2013. Latin American Perspectives on Adaptation of Agricultural Systems to Climate Variability and Change. IN: D. Hillel and C. Rosenzweig (Eds.): Handbook of Climate Change and Agroecosystems: Global and Regional Aspects and Implications. pp 57–72. ICP Series on Climate Change Impacts, Adaptation, and Mitigation Vol. 2. Imperial College Press. https://doi.org/10.1142/9781848169845_0004
- Baethgen, W. E.; W. J. Parton; V. Rubio; R. H. Kelly; S. Lutz. 2021. Ecosystem dynamics of crop‐pasture rotations in a fifty‐year field experiment in Southern South America: Century model and field results. SSSAJ 85(2):423–437. https://doi.org/10.1002/saj2.20204
