= Valter Guchua =

Georgian footballer

Personal information
- Full name: Valter Guchua
- Date of birth: 6 July 1975 (age 51)
- Place of birth: Soviet Union
- Height: 1.84 m (6 ft 0 in)
- Position: Defender

Team information
- Current team: FC Baia Zugdidi
- Number: 8

Senior career*
Years	Team	Apps	(Gls)
1991–1992	Amirani Ochamchire		
1993	FC Tskhumi Sokhumi	6	(0)
1993	Amirani Ochamchire		
1994	FC Samgurali Tskaltubo	7	(0)
1994	FC Keramik Baranivka	5	(0)
1995	FC Shevardeni-1906 Tbilisi	12	(0)
1995–1996	FC Samtredia	13	(1)
1996–1997	FC Odishi Zugdidi	26	(1)
1997–2000	FC Dinamo Tbilisi	60	(1)
2000–2001	FC Torpedo Kutaisi	27	(2)
2002	FC Kolkheti-1913 Poti	11	(0)
2002–2003	FC Torpedo Kutaisi	7	(0)
2003	FC Sioni Bolnisi	15	(0)
2004	Saba Qom F.C.		
2004	FC Kolkheti-1913 Poti	1	(0)
2005	FC Zestaponi	11	(0)
2005	FC Dinamo Sokhumi	2	(0)
2006–2007	FC Mglebi Zugdidi	17	(0)
2008–2009	FC Mglebi Zugdidi	17	(1)
2009–2010	FC Baia Zugdidi		
2010	FC Samtredia		

International career
1996–2001	Georgia	5	(0)
- * Club domestic league appearances and goals

Valter Guchua (born 6 June 1975) is a Georgian footballer who plays for FC Baia Zugdidi.

Guchua played for FC Samtredia in UEFA Cup 1995-96, FC Dinamo Tbilisi in UEFA Champions League 1998-99, FC Torpedo Kutaisi in UEFA Champions League 2002-03, Sioni Bolnisi in UEFA Cup 2003-04.

He made his Georgia debut on 24 April 1996, against Romania on friendly.
