= Kaely Michels-Gualtieri =

American trapeze artist

Kaely Michels-Gualtieri is an American trapeze artist known for her work as a leading artist with the Ringling Bros. and Barnum & Bailey Circus, often performing under the stage name "Electra". She is the winner of two Golden Flyer Awards as one of the world's leading swing trapeze artists. She won a Silver Ring, Russia's highest trapeze honor, in 2017. She is the youngest person ever nominated for membership in the Circus Hall of Fame.

== Career ==
Michels-Gualtieri is a graduate of The Field School in Washington, DC. She subsequently trained with L’Academie Fratellini, the first American ever to be admitted to the school, where she studied under coach Alexander Doubrovski and with coach Victor Fomine in Montreal.

Michels-Gualtieri performed internationally with Circus Gerbola (Ireland), Cirque Italia, Cirque de Demain (France), Corpus Acrobatics (Luxembourg), NoFit State Circus (England) and Star Parivaar (Indian) before joining Ringling Brothers in 2014.

She left the circus briefly to study at Brown University in 2016.

Michels-Gualtieri later returned to performing at Circo Atayde in Mexico City, Cirque de Massy in Paris, Winter Circus Apeldorn, Le Grande Cirque in Manila and the Golden Trick Festival in Odessa. She also performed for the Big E Circus in 2019.

She is now a solo aerialist with Cirque du Soleil in Las Vegas.
