= Walt Bellamy (ice hockey) =

Canadian ice hockey player (1881–1941)

- Born: November 27, 1881 Orono, Ontario, Canada
- Died: July 24, 1941 (aged 59)
- Height: 5 ft 7 in (170 cm)
- Weight: 150 lb (68 kg; 10 st 10 lb)
- Position: Left wing
- Shot: Left
- Played for: Montreal Shamrocks
- Playing career: 1902–1910

Walter Victor Bellamy (November 27, 1881 – July 24, 1941) was a Canadian professional ice hockey player.

== Hockey Career ==
He played with the Montreal Shamrocks of the Canadian Hockey Association and the National Hockey Association.
