= Valter (Brazilian footballer) =

Brazilian footballer

Personal information
- Full name: Valter Silva do Nascimento
- Date of birth: 24 January 1975 (age 51)
- Place of birth: Salvador, Bahia, Brazil
- Position: Striker

Senior career*
Years	Team	Apps	(Gls)
1996	Royal		
1996–1998	Paços de Ferreira	18	(1)
1998–1999	Lusitânia	30	(8)
1999	União de Lamas	14	(1)
2000	Académico Viseu	16	(1)
2000–2002	São João de Ver	54	(23)
2002	Pombal	10	(1)
2003	Dragões Sandinenses	8	(0)
2003–2004	Oliveirense	18	(4)
2004	São João de Ver		
2004	GD Beira-Mar		
2005–?	Peniche		
2006	Freamunde	0	(0)
2007	Pedrouços		
2007–2008	Rio Tinto		
2008–2009	Pedrouços		
2009–2010	Valonguense	16	(7)
2010	Custóias	2	(0)
2011	Nespereira		
- * Club domestic league appearances and goals

Valter Silva do Nascimento (born 24 January 1975) is a retired Brazilian football striker.
