= Theodore Martin =

Scottish poet, biographer, and translator

Sir Theodore Martin KCB KCVO
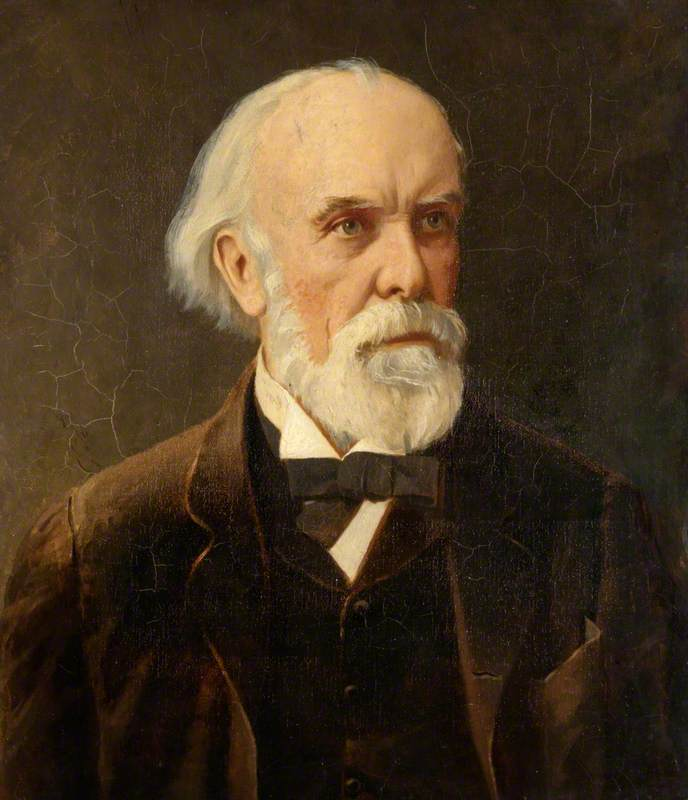
- Sir Theodore Martin, 1816 - 1909. Lawyer and writer, by Reginald Cholmondeley
- Born: 16 September 1816
- Died: 18 August 1909 (aged 92)
- Education: University of Edinburgh
- Spouse: Helena Faucit (m. 1851; died 1898)

Sir Theodore Martin KCB KCVO (16 September 1816 – 18 August 1909) was a Scottish poet, biographer, and translator.

== Biography ==
Martin was born in Edinburgh, the only son of Mary, the daughter of James Reid, a shipowner from Fraserburgh and James Martin, a solicitor. He was educated at the Royal High School and attended the University of Edinburgh from 1830-1833. He practised as a solicitor in Edinburgh 1840–45, after which he went to London and became head of the firm of Martin and Leslie, parliamentary agents.

His first contribution to literature was the humorous Bon Gaultier Ballads, written along with W.E. Aytoun, which remained popular for a long time; originally contributed to a magazine, they appeared in book form in 1845.

Martin's translations include Dante's Vita Nuova, Oehlenschläger's Correggio and Aladdin, Heinrich Heine's Poems and Ballads, Friedrich Schiller's Wilhelm Tell, and Hertz's King René's Daughter. He also published a complete translation of Horace with a Life, and one of Catullus.

He is probably best known for his Life of the Prince Consort (1874–80), the writing of which was entrusted to him by Queen Victoria, a work which won him her lifelong friendship. He also wrote Lives of Professor Aytoun and Lord Lyndhurst.

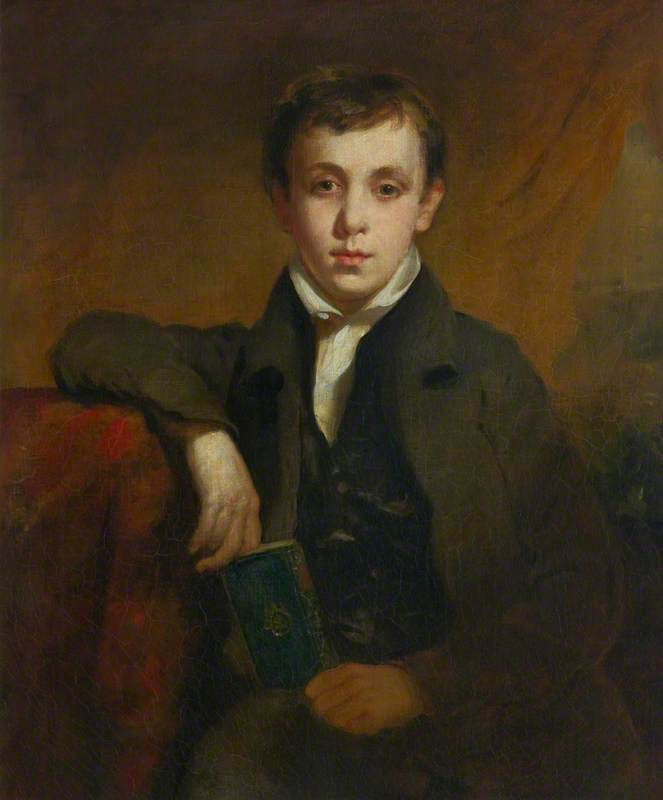
Portrait by Thomas Duncan, 1826

In 1851 he married Helena Faucit, a well-known actress, and author of studies on Shakespeare's Female Characters, whose Life he published in 1901. The couple lived for some time at Bryntysilio (The Hill of St. Tyssilio) which he bought in 1861, near Llangollen, where in 1889 they were visited by the queen during her progress in Wales.

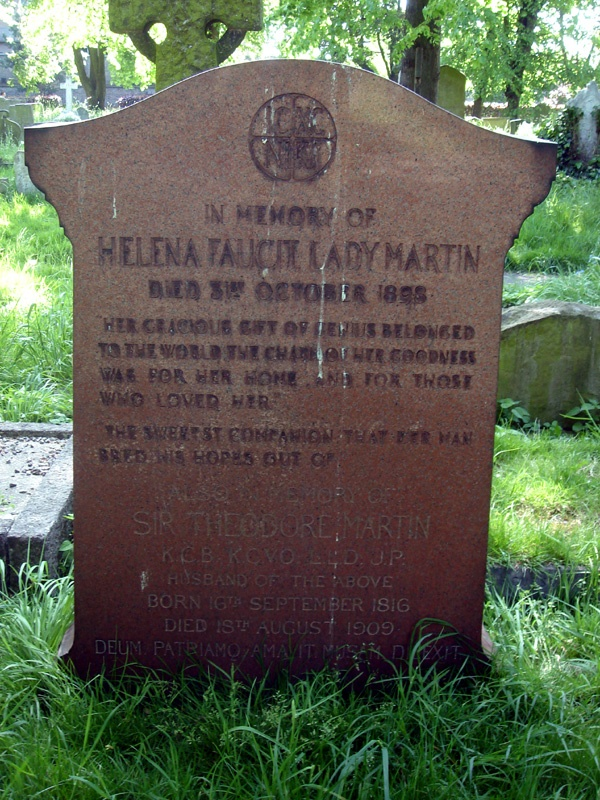
Funerary monument, Brompton Cemetery, London

Martin kept up his intellectual activity into old age, published in 1905 a translation of Leopardi's poems, and Monographs (1906). He was Lord Rector of the University of St Andrews in 1881, received an LLD from the University of Edinburgh in 1875, and Knight Commander of the Order of the Bath in 1880.

He died in 1909 and is buried in Brompton Cemetery, London.

== Sources ==
- Chisholm, Hugh, ed. (1911). "Martin, Sir Theodore" . Encyclopædia Britannica. Vol. 17 (11th ed.). Cambridge University Press.
- Lee, Sidney, ed. (1912). "Martin, Theodore" . Dictionary of National Biography (2nd supplement). Vol. 2. London: Smith, Elder & Co.
- Ward, A. W.; Basu, Sayoni. "Martin, Sir Theodore (1816–1909)". Oxford Dictionary of National Biography (online ed.). Oxford University Press. doi:10.1093/ref:odnb/34906. (Subscription, Wikipedia Library access or UK public library membership required.)

Academic offices
| Preceded by Earl of Selborne | Rector of the University of St Andrews; 1880 - 1883 | Succeeded by Lord Reay |
