= Walter Spradbery =

British designer, painter and poet

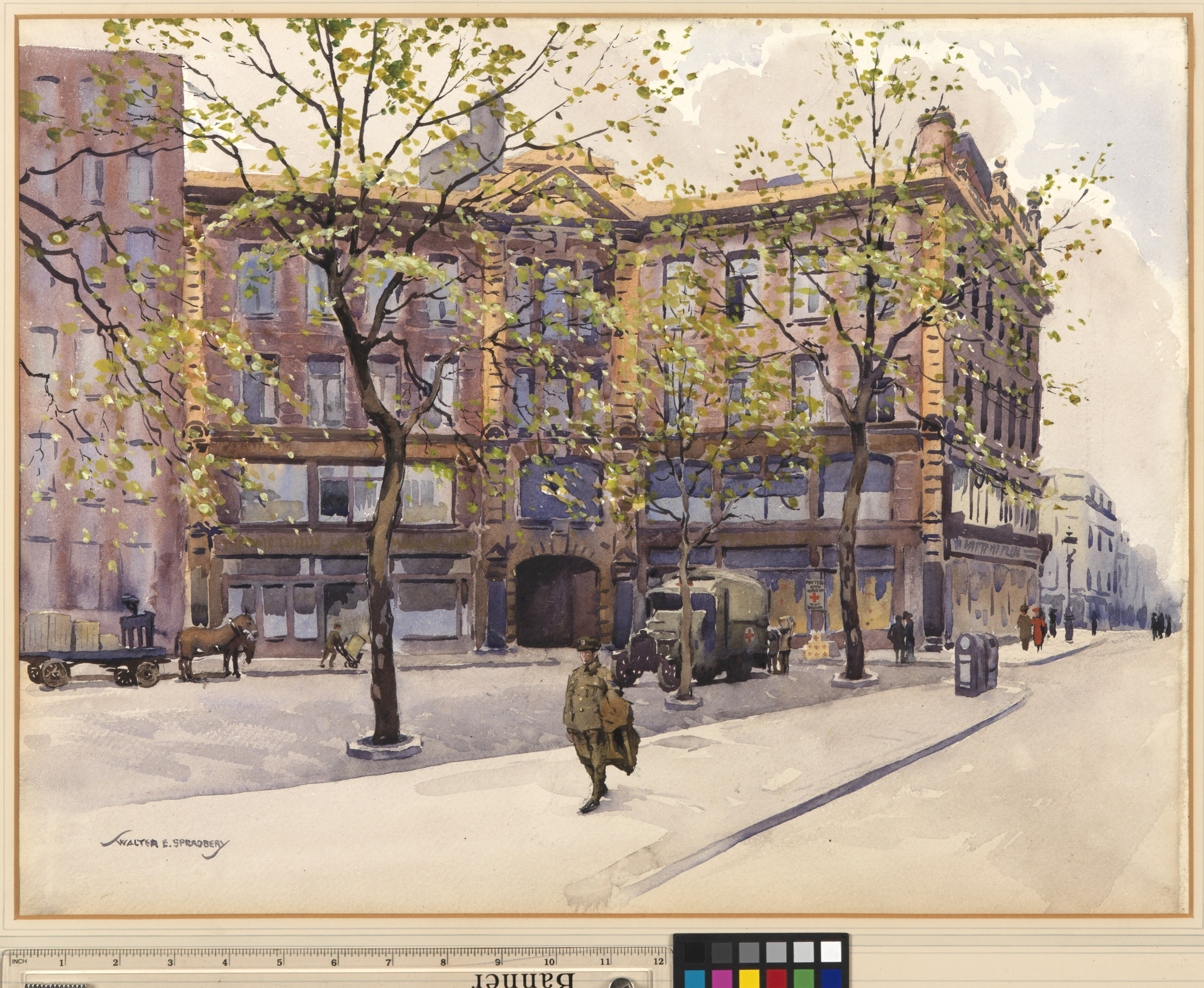
The Brcs and Order of St John Stores, Tottenham Court Road, London during World War I

Walter Ernest Spradbery (1889–1969) was a British designer, painter and poet.

Spradbery trained at the Walthamstow School of Art. From 1911 until 1944, he designed posters, primarily for London Transport.

In 1929, he married the opera singer Dorothy d'Orsay, and they settled in Buckhurst Hill, Essex.
