= Filippo Antonio Gualterio =

Filippo Antonio Gualterio may refer to:

- Filippo Antonio Gualterio (cardinal) (1660–1728), papal nuncio to France,
- Filippo Antonio Gualterio (senator) (1819–1879), Italian minister of the interior of the Italian kingdom
