= Wouter Schievink =

Dutch surgeon (born 1963)

- Born: 1963 (age 62–63); Amsterdam, The Netherlands
- Education: University of Amsterdam Medical School
- Occupation: neurological surgeon
- Known for: expertise in brain and spinal cord vascular disorders
- Notable work: see Work

Wouter Ingmar Schievink (born 1963, Amsterdam) is a neurological surgeon noted for expertise in brain and spinal cord vascular disorders.

== Education and employment ==
Schievink earned his medical degree at the University of Amsterdam Medical School in 1989 and completed residency training at the Mayo Clinic in Rochester, Minnesota in 1997. This was followed by a cerebrovascular fellowship at the Barrow Neurologic Institute in Phoenix, Arizona. He was the Assistant Professor of Neurological Surgery in the Department of Neurological Surgery at the UCI Medical Center, Irvine, California from 1998 to 2000.

He began academic practice in neurosurgery in 1997 at the Neurosurgical Institute at Cedars-Sinai Medical Center in Los Angeles, California, USA. There, he is the Director of the Microvascular Neurosurgery Program since 1998.

== Work ==
He has written and published extensively on cerebral aneurysms, cerebrovascular arterial dissections, and collagen vascular disease as related to the central nervous system. Schievink is also an expert and well published author on Spontaneous Cerebrospinal Fluid Leak Syndrome. Schievink was the lead physician on the first ever successful attempt of using fibrin glue to reverse a coma.

As of July 2009, he had published some 130 papers in scientific journals. He is a manuscript reviewer for about 20 journals, including The Lancet and Neurology.
