= Claude Volter =

Belgian comedian and theatre director

- Born: Claude Wolter; 31 January 1933; Matadi, Belgian Congo
- Died: 15 October 2002 (aged 69); Woluwe-Saint-Pierre, Belgium
- Occupations: Actor, comedian and director

Claude Volter (31 January 1933 – 15 October 2002), father of actor Philippe Volter, was a Belgian comedian and theatre director.

Born as Claude Wolter in 1933, he later changed his surname to Volter. In 1957, he and his wife, actress Jacqueline Bir, moved to Brussels, and founded the Comédie Claude Volter, which he led until his death in 2002 at the age of 69.
