= Gualtiero Calboli =

Italian classicist and linguist (1932–2026)

Gualtiero Calboli (3 January 1932 – 22 March 2026) was an Italian classicist and linguist. He was Chair of Latin Language and Literature at the University of Bologna, in Italy. He was appointed to chair in 1973. From 1982 to 2000, he was head of the Department of Classical and Medieval Philology. He was the editor of the major series "Papers on Grammar" (Bologna, CLUEB, then Rome, Herder, 1980–2008) and edited editions of Marcus Porcius Cato and Cornificius.

Calboli died on 22 March 2026, at the age of 94.

== Principal works ==
- Studi grammaticali, Bologna, Zanichelli, 1962
- Cornificiana 2, L'autore e la tendenza politica della Rhetorica ad Herennium, "Atti della Accademia delle Scienze dell'Istituto di Bologna, Cl. di Scienze Morali" LI/LII (1963/1964) 1–114
- La formazione oratoria di Cicerone, "Vichiana" II (1965) 3–30.
- I modi del verbo greco e latino 1903-1966, "Lustrum" XI (1966) 173–349.
- Die Modi des griechischen und lateinischen Verbums 1966-2010, "Lustrum" 53, 2011, 9–150.
- Cornifici Rhetorica ad C. Herennium, Introduzione, Testo Critico, Commento a c. di G. Calboli, Bologna 1969, pp. XII-498.
- La linguistica moderna e il latino: i casi, Bologna, Pàtron, 1972.
- L'oratore M.Antonio e la Rhetorica ad Herennium, "GIF" n.s. III (XXIV) (1972) 120–177.
- Die Entwicklung der klassischen Sprachen und die Beziehung zwischen Satzbau, Wortstellung und Artikel, "IF" LXXXIII (1978) 197–261.
- Marci Porci Catonis Oratio pro Rhodiensibus, Catone, l'Oriente Greco e gli Imprenditori Romani, Introduzione, Edizione Critica dei Frammenti, Traduzione Ital. e Commento, a c. di G. Calboli, Bologna 1978.
- La retorica preciceroniana e la politica a Roma, "Entretiens Hardt" XXVIII (1982) 41–108.
- Nota di Aggiornamento a E. Norden, La Prosa d'Arte Antica, Trad. Ital. Roma 1986, 971–1185.
- G. Calboli-G. Moroni, Grammatica Italiana, Bologna 1989, pp. XIV-726.
- Über das Lateinische: vom Indogermanischen zu den romanischen Sprachen, Tübingen, Max Niemeyer, 1997
- Le Senatus Consultum de Cn. Pisone patre, quelques considerations linguistiques, in B. Bureau -Ch. Nicolas (Éds.), Moussyllanea, "Mélanges de Linguistique et de Littérature anciennes offerts à Claude Moussy", Louvain-la-Neuve 1998, 113–126.
- G. Calboli, L. Montefusco, Quintiliano y su esquela, con L. Montefusco, Logroño 2002.
- "Latin Syntax and Greek", in: Philip Baldi-Pierluigi Cuzzolin, New Perspectives on Historical Latin Syntax 1, W. de Gruyter, Berlin-New York 2009, pp. 65–193.
