= Walter Schmidt Ballardo =

Walter Schmidt Ballardo (born in Texcoco, August 10, 1953) is a Mexican musician, multi-instrumentalist, composer, and journalist. He is the founder of the bands Decibel, Size and Casino Shanghai.

== Career ==
He grew up in Colonia Del Valle in Mexico City. He became interested in music during his youth, taking guitar and flute lessons at the Sala Chopin music store, which he eventually left as they did not suit his style. He was gifted a flute, which he later exchanged for an electric bass. Schmidt frequented places in Mexico City such as the record store Hip 70, where he met other music enthusiasts like Carlos Robledo in 1972. He started in music with Magic Anvil, a cover band along with Humberto Álvarez and Federico Luna. In 1974, he co-founded the progressive and experimental rock group Decibel with Carlos Robledo. The group remained active until 1979. After Decibel disbanded, he took part in the formation of the post-punk and new wave band Size in 1979 under the pseudonym Dennis Sanborns. Between 1985 and 1986, he was part of Casino Shanghai. Schmidt plays electric bass, guitar, flute, cello, saxophone, various synthesizers and keyboards, as well as providing vocals.

As a music journalist, he has been active since 1972, starting with the magazine La edad del rock, and has contributed to publications such as Conecte, Pop, México Canta, La Edad del Rock, Rock Póster, and Rolling Stone. As a radio producer, he has worked at stations such as Radio Educación — where he hosted the program "Música marginal" for twelve years — Radio UNAM — where he programmed "Rock marginal" from 1981 to 1991 — and Estéreo Joven (now Reactor) of the Mexican Radio Institute.

Both in his musical work and in media, Schmidt has promoted experimental and unconventional music, and has worked to bring avant-garde genres and movements of the time — such as progressive rock and Rock in Opposition — to wider audiences.

== Discography ==
=== With Decibel ===
- El poeta del ruido (Orfeón/MIO, 1979)

=== With Size ===
- El diablo en el cuerpo / La cabellera de Berenice (1984)
- Nadie puede vivir con un monstruo (reissue on Bandcamp, 2018)

=== Casino Shanghai ===
- Film (Comrock, 1985)

=== Solo ===
- Bosques de niebla (Discos Abronia, 2000)
- The wooden soldier and the China doll (Discos Abronia, 2001)
- Ríos de sangre (Luna negra, 2005)
- Clásicos (Discos Abronia, 2018)
