= Vautier =

Vautier is a surname. Notable people with the surname include:

- Annie Vautier (1939–2024), French artist
- Ben Vautier (1935–2024), French artist
- Cath Vautier (1902–1989), New Zealand netball player
- Kerrin Vautier, New Zealand economist
- René Vautier, (1928–2015), French filmmaker
- Tristan Vautier (born 1989), French racing driver

== See also ==
- Saunders v Vautier, English trusts law case
