= Johann Jakob Walther (artist) =

German painter (1604–1677)

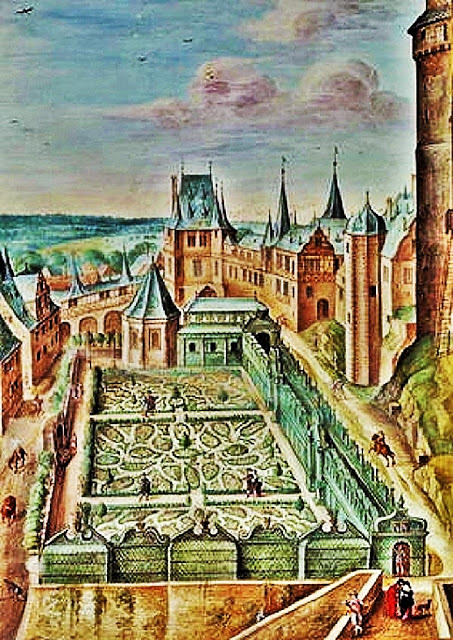
Gardens at Idstein

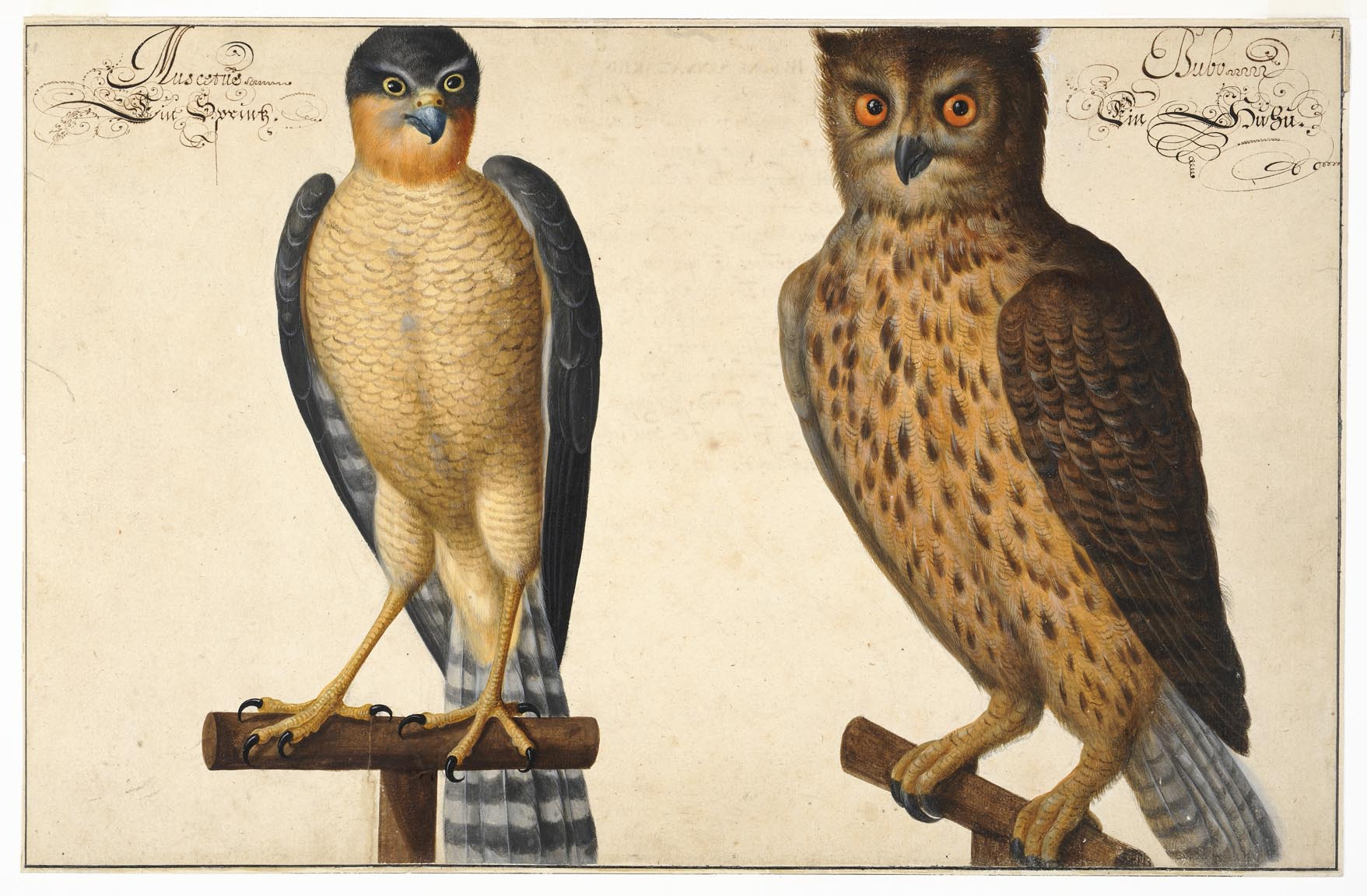
Crécelle et Hibou, aquarelle and gouache on paper (Cabinet des estampes et des dessins de Strasbourg)

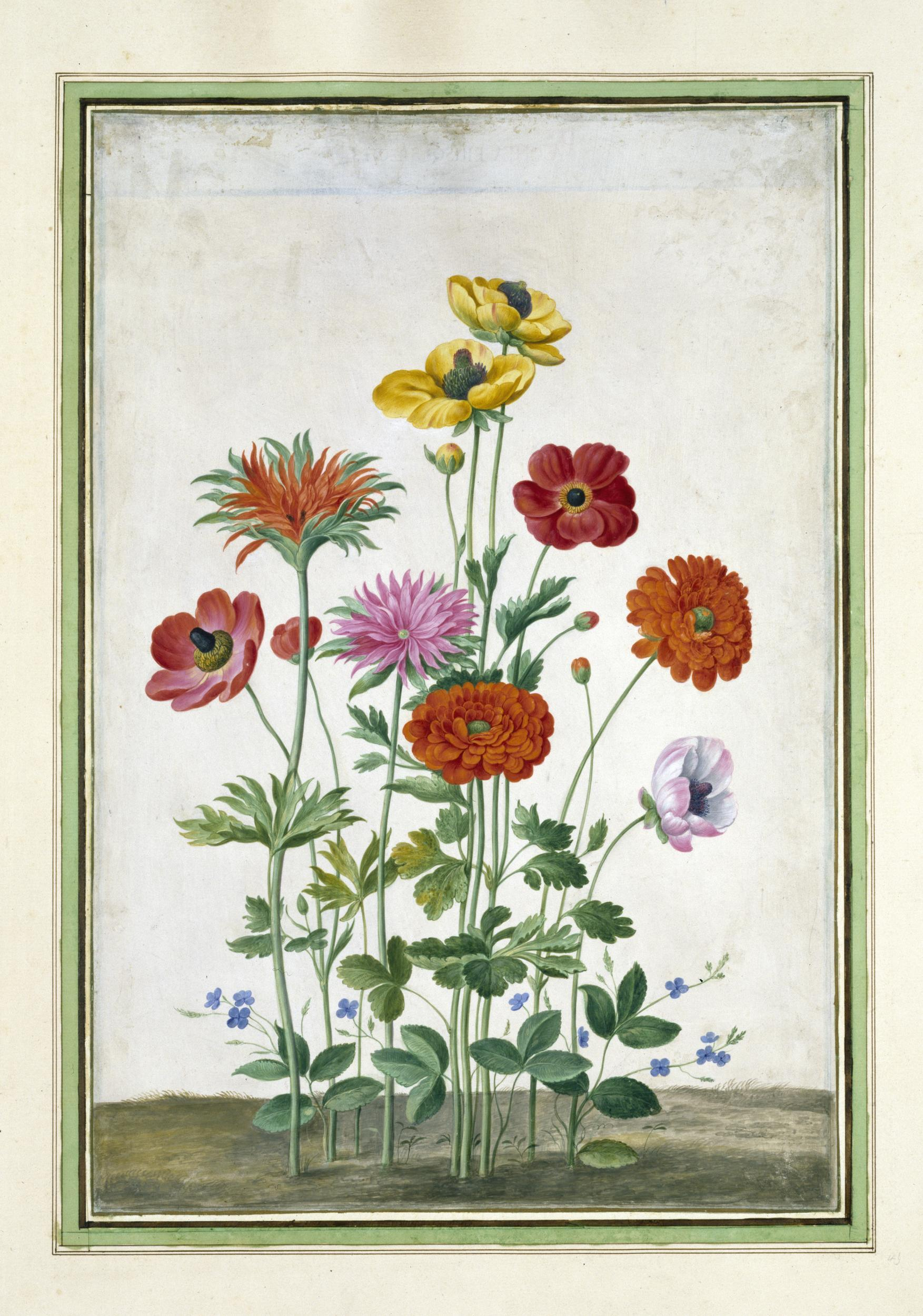
Plate from 'Nassau Florilegium'

Johann Jakob Walther (23 January 1604 – 1676/7 Strasbourg) was a painter and natural history illustrator, who chronicled the life of Strasbourg during the Thirty Years' War, but is best known for his work Horti Itzeinensis a.k.a. the Nassau Florilegium depicting flowering plants from the gardens of Johann, Count of Nassau-Idstein at Idstein.

Walther was the son of Gerard Walther. He probably trained in the workshop of miniaturist Friedrich Brentel. He left Strasbourg around 1618 and returned in 1635. He was elected to the Grand Council of the city in 1659. His meeting in Strasbourg with the Count was a decisive moment in his career, since the Count became one of his most important patrons.

This was an era when the purpose of a florilegium was to serve as a pictorial catalogue of a garden, and correspondence shows that the Count invited Walther to Idstein near Frankfurt to spend the spring and summer months there to paint flowers and fruits from the garden - Walther did so on at least eight occasions between 1654 and 1674. The paintings were bound into anthologies of which only three versions are known - one at the Victoria and Albert Museum in London has 133 flower studies and a number of views of the garden that are painted on paper and bound in two volumes, another at the National Library of France, a codex of 54 gouaches on parchment, and the final set at the Städel Museum in Frankfurt am Main which has two volumes of the Florilegium with 130 gouaches of flowers on parchment.

Walther was the great-uncle of the painter François Walter (1755-1830).

== Bibliography ==
- (in German) Strassburg im Dreissigjährigen Kriege, Fragment aus der Strassburgischen Chronik des Malers J.J. Walther, nebst Einleitung und biographischer Notiz von Rudolf Reuss, Strasbourg, 1879, 41 p.
- (in German) Das Vogelbuch (Johann Jakob Walther); nach den Tafeln der Graphischen Sammlung Albertina in Wien bearbeitet von Armin Geus, Harenberg, Dortmund, 1982, 95 p. ISBN 3-88379-308-6
- (in English) Jenny de Gex (dir.), So many sweet flowers : a seventeenth-century florilegium / paintings by Johann Walther 1654 (préface de Gill Saunders), Pavilion, Londres, 1997, 104 p. ISBN 1-85793-353-2
- Laure Beaumont-Maillet, Le 'Florilège de Nassau-Idstein' par Johann Walter, 1604-1676, Anthèse, Arcueil, 1993, 95 p. ISBN 978-2-904420-66-5
- Emmanuel Bénézit et Jacques Busse, Dictionnaire critique et documentaire des peintres, sculpteurs, dessinateurs et graveurs de tous les temps et de tous les pays, vol. 14, 1999 (4th ed.), p. 420 ISBN 978-2-7000-3025-9
- D'après nature : chefs-d'œuvre de l'art naturaliste en Alsace de 1450 à 1800 : Schongauer, Grünewald, Baldung, Hermann, Walter... (exposition à Strasbourg, Église protestante Saint-Pierre-le-Jeune, 25 juin-2 octobre 1994), Ed. Creamuse, Ed. Andromaque, Strasbourg, 1994, 199 p.
- François Lotz, Artistes peintres alsaciens décédés avant 1800, Kaysersberg, Ed. Printek, 1994, p. 150.
- François Joseph Fuchs, « Johann (Jacob) Walt(h)er », notice du Nouveau dictionnaire de biographie alsacienne, Strasbourg, Fédération des Sociétés d'Histoire et d'Archéologie d'Alsace, 2002, n°39 p. 4081-4082.
- Collections, A (2018-02-26). "Tulips - Walther, Johann Jakob". V and A Collections.
