= Gutierre =

Gutierre is an old Spanish male given name. The surname Gutiérrez is derived from this name.

== Notable people ==
Notable people with the name include:

- Gutierre Álvarez de Toledo, Spanish priest
- Gutierre de Cetina (1519–1554), Spanish poet and soldier
- Gutierre de Hevia (d. 1772), Spanish military man
- Gutierre de Miranda, Spanish governor
- Gutierre de Vargas Carvajal (1506-1559), Spanish priest
- Gutierre Fernández (composer) (c. 1547–1623), South American composer and Roman Catholic priest of Spanish birth
- Gutierre Fernández (Leonese nobleman) (fl. 1084–1117), Leonese nobleman
- Gutierre Fernández de Castro (fl. 1124–66), Castilian nobleman
- Gutierre Menéndez, Galician nobleman
- Gutierre Núñez, Castilian nobleman
- Gutierre Rodríguez de Castro (d. 1195), Castilian nobleman
- Gutierre Tibón (1905–1999), Italian-Mexican author
- Gutierre Vermúdez (died 1130), Leonese nobleman
- Hermenegildo Gutiérrez, Galician,c. 850 – after May 912, the Mayordomo mayor of King Alfonso III, he was an active member of the curia regia

== See also ==
- Gutierre-Muñoz, Spain
