= Walter of Pontoise =

French abbot and saint (c. 1030–1099)

Saint Walter of Pontoise
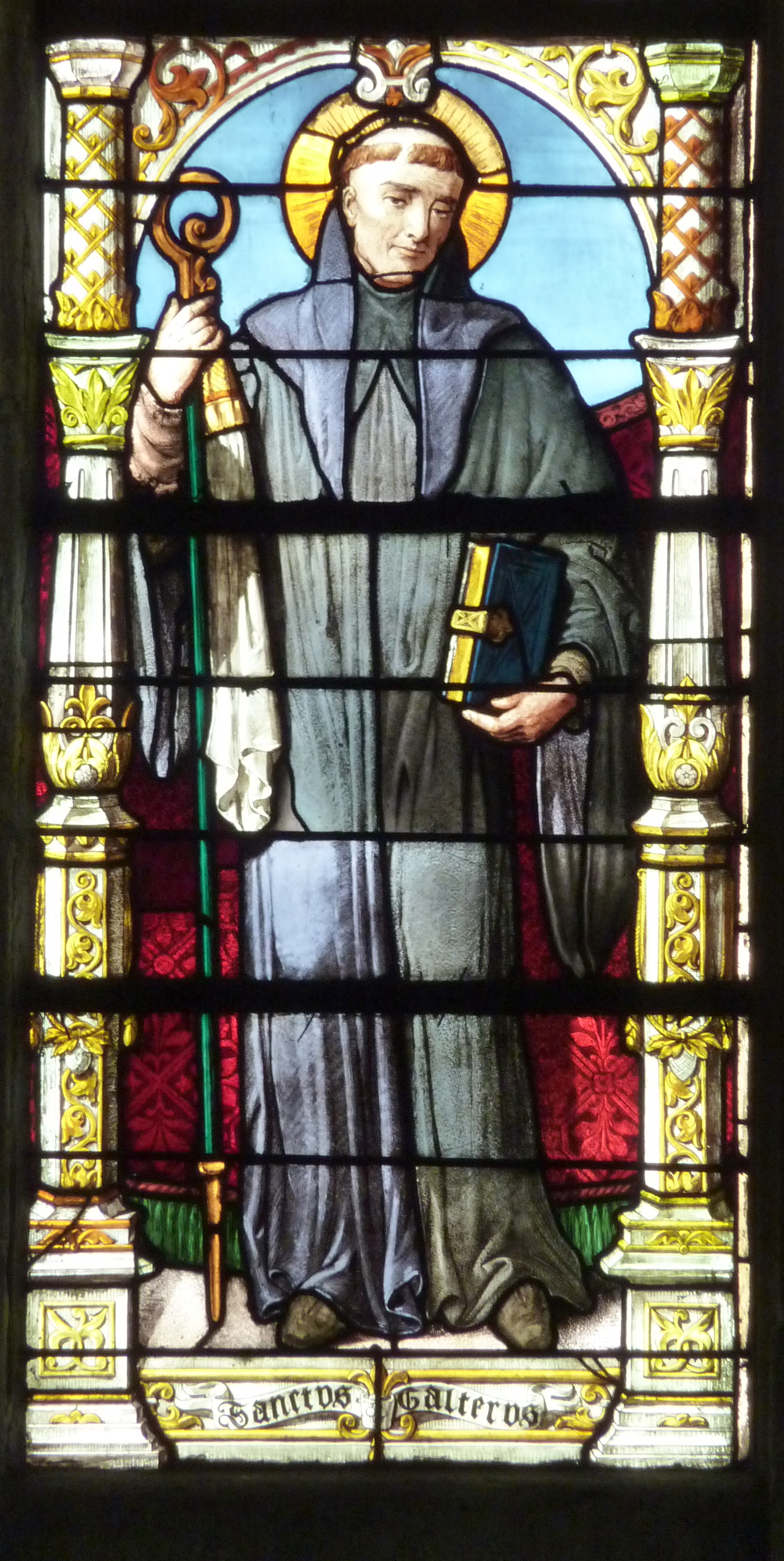
- Born: c. 1030; Andainville, Picardy
- Died: Good Friday c. 1099
- Venerated in: Catholic Church
- Canonized: 1153 by Hugh de Boves, the Archbishop of Rouen
- Feast: March 23; April 8
- Patronage: Prisoners; prisoners of war; vintners; invoked against job-related stress

Walter of Pontoise (French: Gautier, Gaultier, Gaucher; c. 1030 – c. 1099) was a French abbot. He is venerated as a saint in the Catholic Church, the last saint to be canonized by an ecclesiastical authority other than the pope.

== Life ==
Born in Andainville in modern-day northern France, he was a professor of philosophy and rhetoric before becoming a Benedictine monk at Rebais (diocese of Meaux). A story told of him is that while a novice, Walter took pity on an inmate at the monastery prison and helped the prisoner to escape.

Philip I appointed him abbot of a new foundation at Pontoise, despite Walter's protestations. The foundation of Pontoise was initially dedicated to Saint Germanus of Paris, but then was dedicated to Martin of Tours. The discipline at this new foundation was lax, and Walter fled the house several times to avoid this responsibility.

Walter left his position at Pontoise to become a monk at Cluny under Hugh but he was forced to return to Pontoise. A story told of him was that he once took the road to the Touraine and hid himself on an island in the Loire, before being led back to the abbey. He also escaped to an oratory near Tours dedicated to Cosmas and Damian before being recognized by a pilgrim there.

After being forced to return, Walter decided to go to Rome to appeal directly to the pope. Walter gave Pope Gregory VII his written resignation, but Gregory ordered him to assume his responsibilities as abbot and never leave again.

Thereafter, he campaigned against the abuses and corruptions of his fellow Benedictines and was beaten and imprisoned. He resumed his work upon release. He founded, in 1094, at Berteaucourt-les-Dames near Amiens, a monastery for women, with the assistance of Godelinda and Elvige (also spelled Godelende and Héleguide).

== Veneration ==
Walter was buried in the abbey at Pontoise. He was canonized by Hugh, Archbishop of Rouen, in 1153, and was the last saint in Western Europe to be canonized by an authority other than the pope. "The last case of canonization by a metropolitan is said to have been that of St. Gaultier, or Gaucher, abbat [sic] of Pontoise, by the Archbishop of Rouen, A.D. 1153. A decree of Pope Alexander III, A.D. 1170, gave the prerogative to the pope thenceforth, so far as the Western Church was concerned."

During the French Revolution, his body was translated to the cemetery of Pontoise, and was later lost. The College of Saint Martin of Pontoise, now an Oratorian foundation, celebrates his feast.
