= 70th Regiment =

70th Regiment may refer to:

- 70th Regiment of Foot (disambiguation), British Army regiments
- 70th (Sussex) Searchlight Regiment, Royal Artillery
- 70th Armor Regiment, United States
- 70th Infantry Regiment (United States)
- 70th Armoured Regiment (India)

== American Civil War regiments ==
- 70th Illinois Infantry Regiment
- 70th Indiana Infantry Regiment
- 70th New York Infantry Regiment
- 70th Ohio Infantry Regiment
- 70th United States Colored Infantry Regiment

== See also ==
- 70th Brigade (disambiguation)
- 70th Division (disambiguation)
