= 70th =

70th is the ordinal form of the number 70. 70th or Seventieth may also refer to:

- A fraction, 1/70, equal to one of 70 equal parts

== Geography ==
- 70th meridian east, a line of longitude
- 70th meridian west, a line of longitude
- 70th parallel north, a circle of latitude
- 70th parallel south, a circle of latitude
- 70th Street (disambiguation)

== Military ==
- 70th Army (Soviet Union)
- 70th Brigade (disambiguation)
- 70th Division (disambiguation)
- 70th Squadron (disambiguation)

== Other ==
- 70th century
- 70th century BC

== See also ==
- 70 (disambiguation)
