= Fiat 502 =

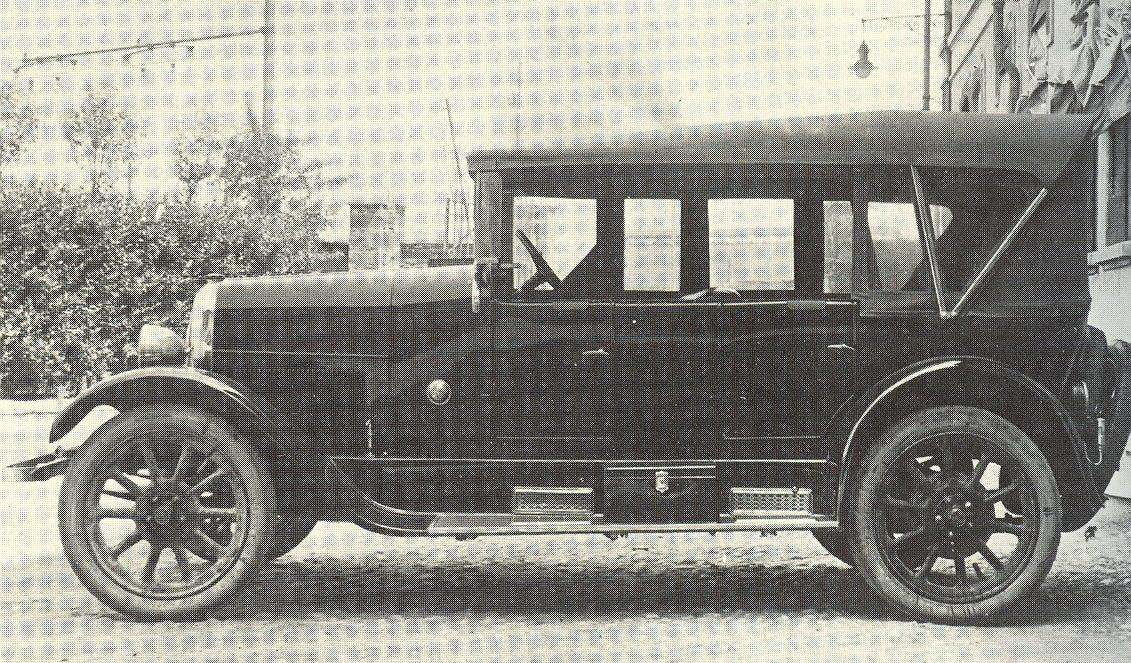
- Fiat 502 Torpedo Luxury 1923

Overview
- Manufacturer: Fiat
- Production: 1923–1926

Body and chassis
- Body style: 4-door sedan 4-door cabriolet
- Layout: FR layout
- Related: Fiat 501

Powertrain
- Engine: straight-4 1460 cc 23 hp
- Transmission: 4-speed manual

Dimensions
- Wheelbase: 275 cm (108.3 in)
- Curb weight: 1,000 kg (2,205 lb)

Chronology
- Predecessor: Fiat Zero
- Successor: Fiat 503

The Fiat 502 is a car produced by Fiat between 1923 and 1926. The 502 was more expensive and bigger variant of the 501. 20,000 were produced.
