= 70D =

70D may refer to:

- Canon EOS 70D DSLR camera introduced in 2013
- Tesla Model S 70D, all-electric sedan
- Tesla Model X 70D, all-electric cross-over SUV (XUV/CUV)

== See also ==
- D70 (disambiguation)
- 70 (disambiguation)
