= Vehicle registration plates of Italy =

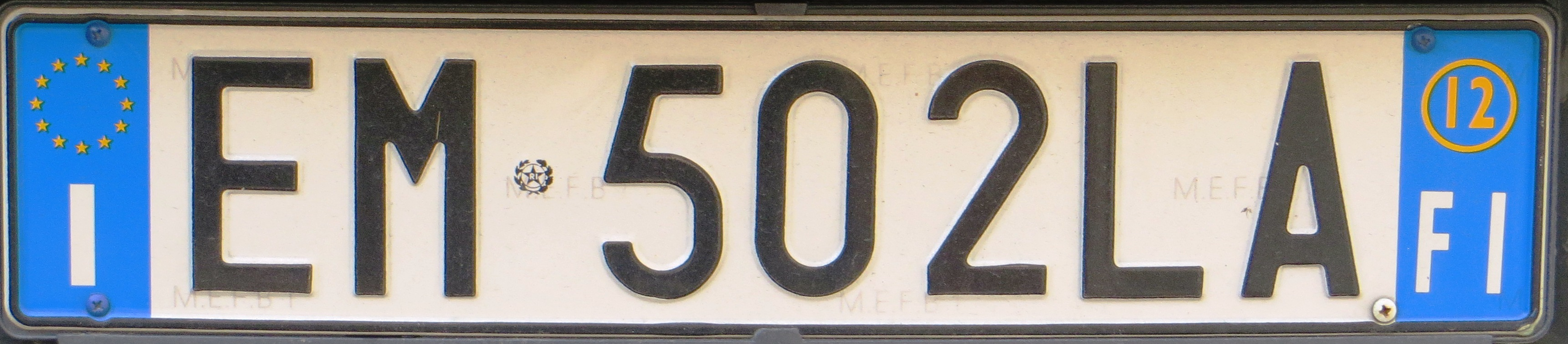
- Current Italian plate. On the right blue strip, optionally, the year of registration (12 = 2012) and the provincial code (FI = Florence)
- Country: Italy
- Country code: I

Current series
- Material: Metal (aluminium)
- Serial format: AB·123CD
- Front plate: 360 mm × 110 mm (14 1/4 in × 4 1/4 in)
- Rear plate: 520 mm × 110 mm (20 1/2 in × 4 5/16 in); 360 mm × 220 mm (14 1/4 in × 8 3/4 in)
- Colour (front): Black on white
- Colour (rear): Black on white
- Introduced: 28 February 1994; 7 February 1999 (restyling)

Availability
- Issued by: Ministry of Infrastructure and Transport (Italy)
- Manufactured by: Istituto Poligrafico e Zecca dello Stato

History
- First issued: 1897

Vehicle registration plates (Italian: targhe d'immatricolazione or simply targhe) are the compulsory alphanumeric plates used to display the registration mark of motor vehicles registered in Italy. They have existed in the country since 1897.

By law, Italian plates can only be made by the Istituto Poligrafico e Zecca dello Stato, assigned by the territorial offices of the Italian Ministry of Infrastructure and Transport, and must be permanently attached to a single vehicle from its first registration to its disposal.

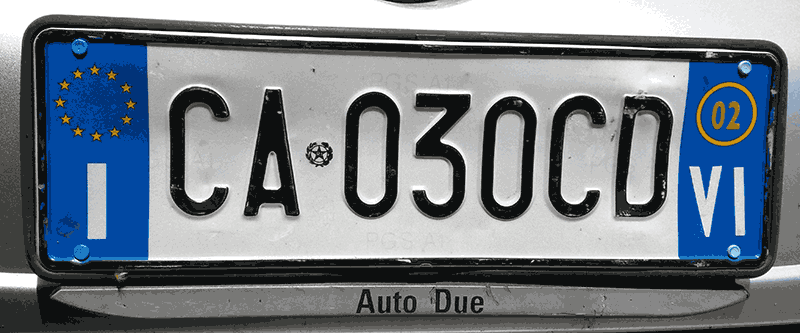
Front vehicle registration plate from Vicenza

The current alphanumeric serial code was introduced on 28 February 1994 and consists of seven black characters on a rectangular, or squared, white background with a defined format (2 letters, 3 numbers, and then 2 letters) which is issued nationwide, regardless of the local registration office. Starting from 7 February 1999, this format was slightly redesigned, adding a blue strip on the left containing the EU flag above the country code I in order to comply with the common EU format, removing the previous space between the last number and the third letter, and adding another blue strip on the right for optional stickers of the first registration year and of the provincial code.

== Table of current plates ==
=== Rectangular plates ===
Plate	Date of release	Notes
AA 000 AA	January 1994	
BA 000 AA	December 1998	
BB 000HH	January 1999	New European format plate with blue band
CA 000AA	March 2002	
DA 000AA	May 2006	
YA 000AA	May 2010	New police plate
EA 000AA	May 2010	
EE 000AA	2011	Not introduced
EF 000AA	2011	
XA 000AA	February 2013	New trailer plate
FA 000AA	June 2015	
GA 000AA	October 2019	
HA 000AA	May 2025	

- The plates with formats between EE 000AA and EE 999ZZ have not been released to avoid confusion with Escursionisti Esteri plates.

=== Squared plates ===
Plate	Date of release	Notes
ZA 000 AA	January 1994	
ZA 400 LV	January 1999	New European format plate with blue band
ZB 000 AA	2006	

== History ==
=== 1897–1901 ===
In 1897, with the Royal Decree of 16 December 1897, n. 540 the first Italian plates were provided for velocipedes and issued by the municipality of residence.

In 1898 the municipality of Milan promulgated the Regulation for the circulation of motor vehicles (article 17) by analogy, according to which a plate showing the owner's name and the municipal license number had to be displayed on the left side of any motor vehicle.

=== 1901–1905 ===
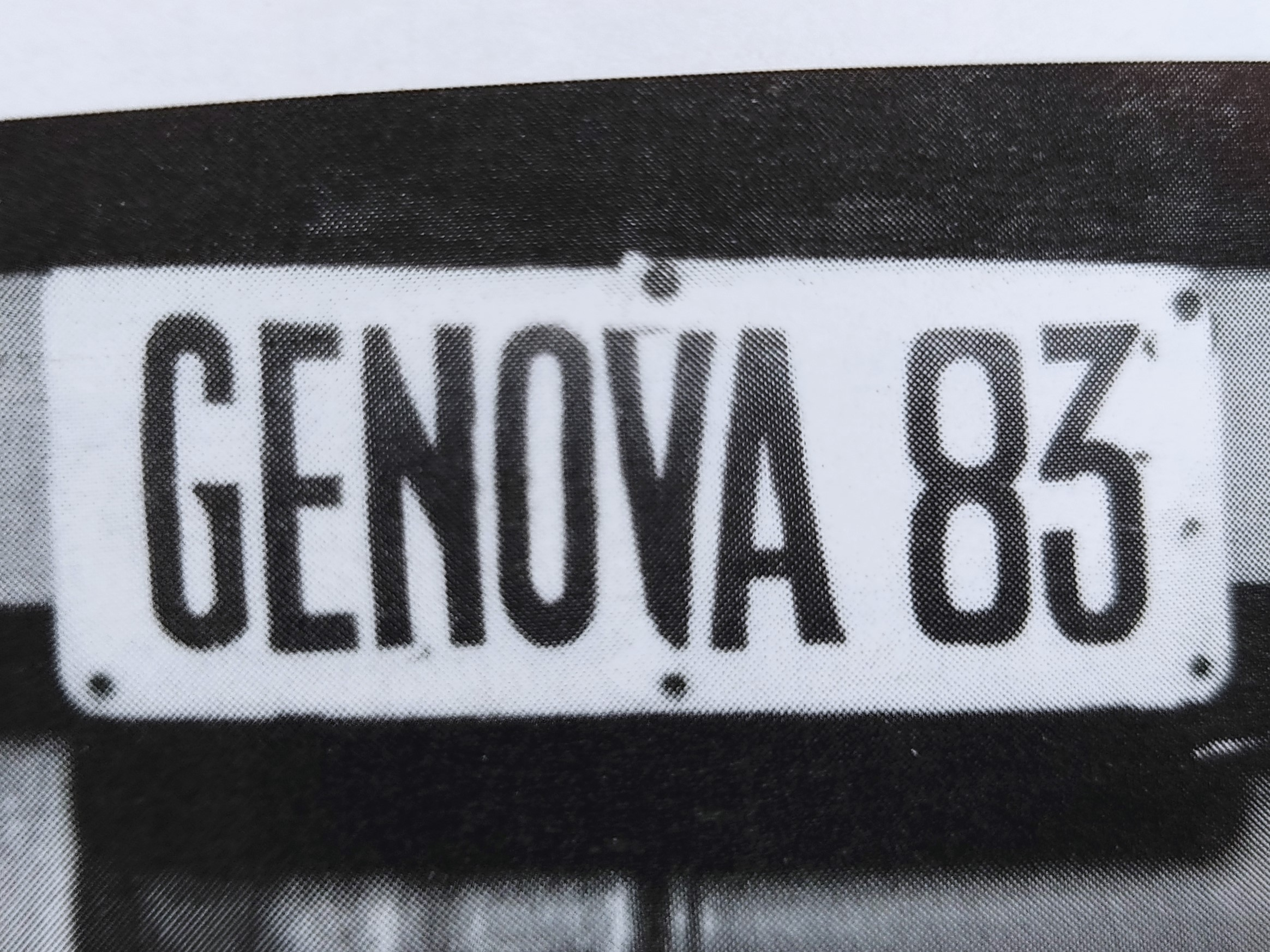
An Italian vehicle plate of the type used from 1901 to 1905, preserved at the Automobile Museum in Turin

With the Royal Decree of 28 August 1901, n. 416 the first Regulation for the circulation of cars on ordinary roads (article 91) was promulgated. This new law included the obligation to equip all vehicles with a specific fixed license plate that had to be created by the owner out of metal, showing the name of the province, followed by a license number issued by the local prefecture in full and with clearly visible characters.

Schematic representation

GENOVA 83

=== 1905–1927 ===
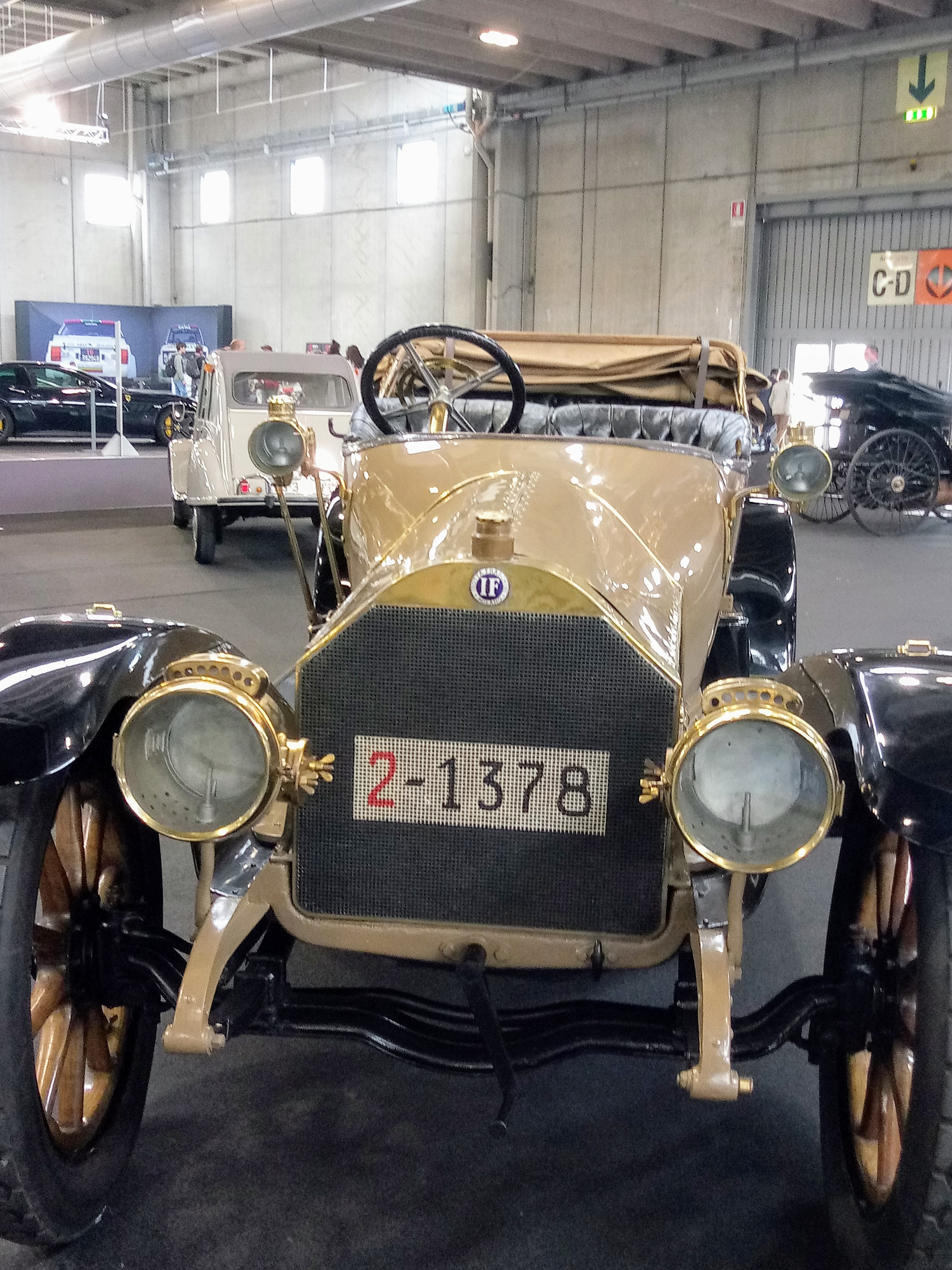
Front plate attached to a 1912–14 Isotta Fraschini radiator, from Ancona (red numeric code =2)

The standard color scheme for plates between 1905 and 1927 was black characters on a white background. The registration number was a numeric code (in red) that differed for each province, and a progressive number unique to that province (in black) on a single line. The standard shape for automobiles was rectangular, while motorcycles had square plates. A front plate was optional.

As in the previous version, the number was assigned by the local prefecture and the plate had to be made by the owner.

Schematic representation

63 – 2993

=== 1927–1976 ===
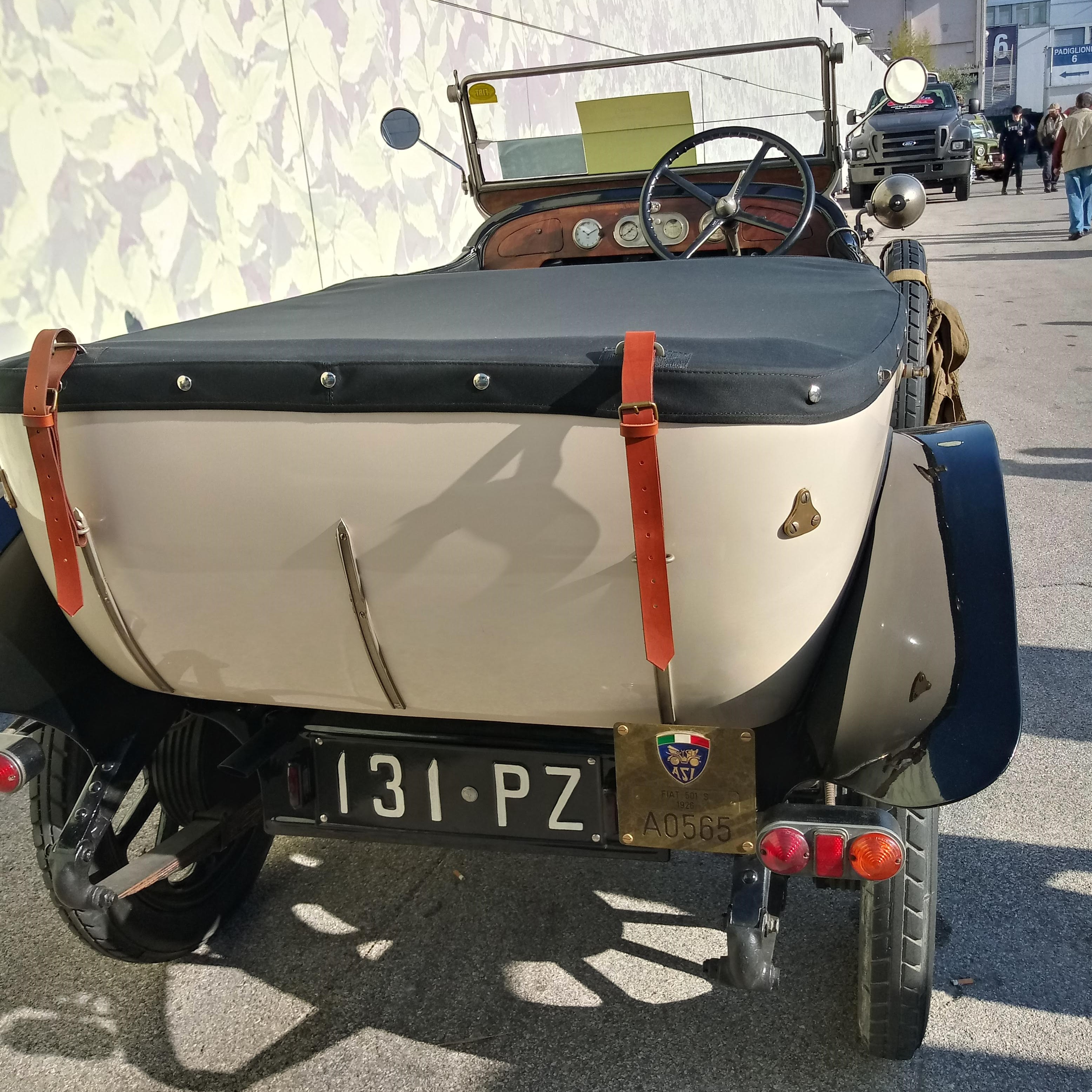
Rear plate used from 1927 to 1932, attached to a Fiat 501. PZ is the provincial code of Potenza.

In 1927, during the Fascist regime, the Kingdom of Italy changed the number plates to a black metallic background with white digits and introduced a new two-letter provincial code for all provinces (except for Rome, which has since then been allowed to keep the full name on registration plates and the unofficial code RM in documents for practical purposes). Between 1927 and 1932, the progressive numeric code was placed before the provincial code, on a single line, for both front and rear plates.

From 1932 to 1951, the front plate remained unchanged, but the rear plate became a 320 x 200 mm square with a slightly altered Garamond font, and the provincial code was moved to the top left corner. Through 1928 to 1944, the Fasces emblem was placed next to the provincial code. After the fall of the Fascist regime, from 1944 to 1948, the registration plates were printed by the National Association of the Amputees and War Invalids, the symbol of which replaced the Fasces emblem. In 1948 the Constitution of the Italian Republic was approved and the Italian Republic emblem appeared for the first time on both rear and front registration plates, but the format and font continued to be the same.

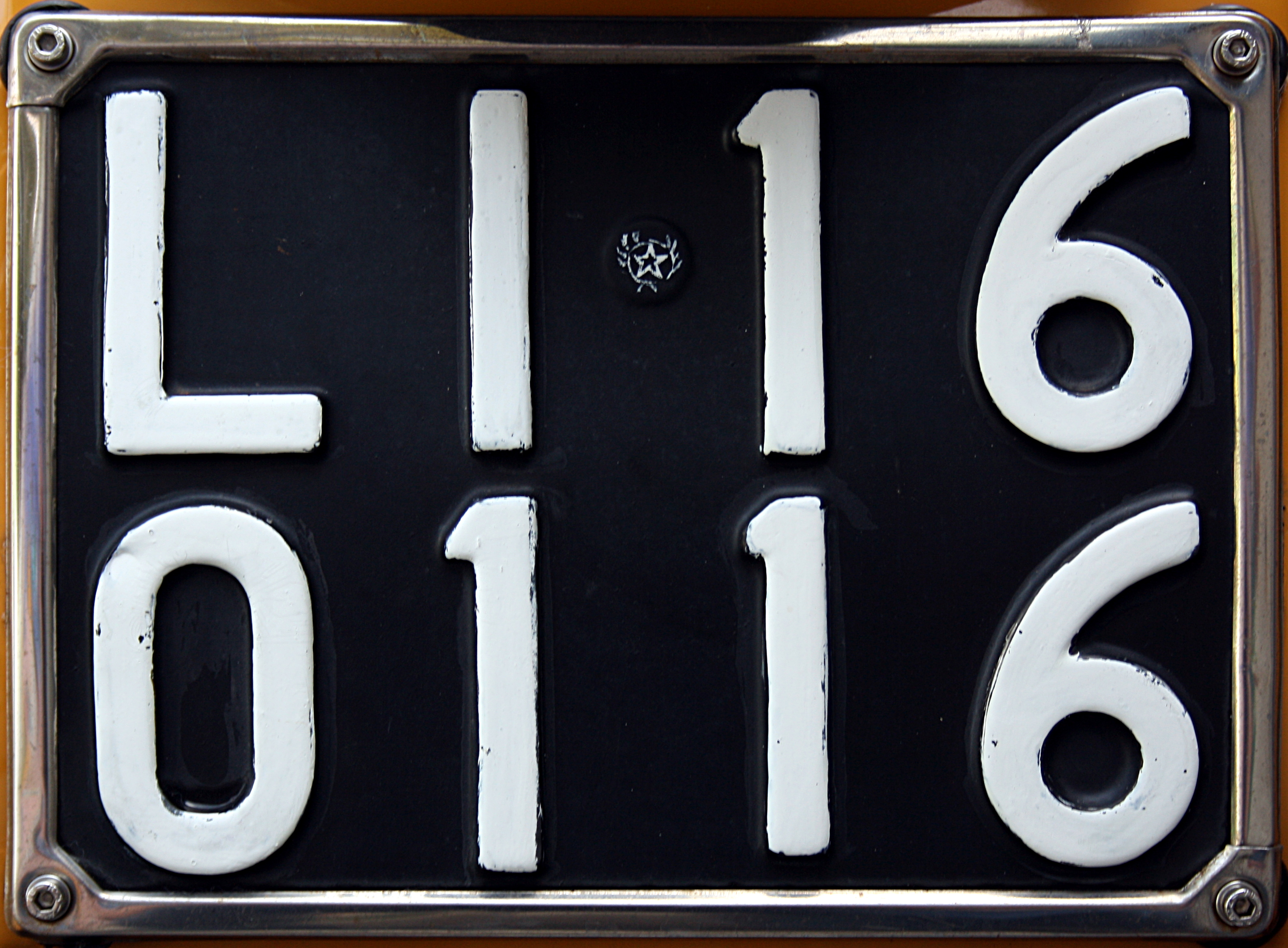
Rear registration plate used from 1951 to 1976, LI is the provincial code of Livorno.

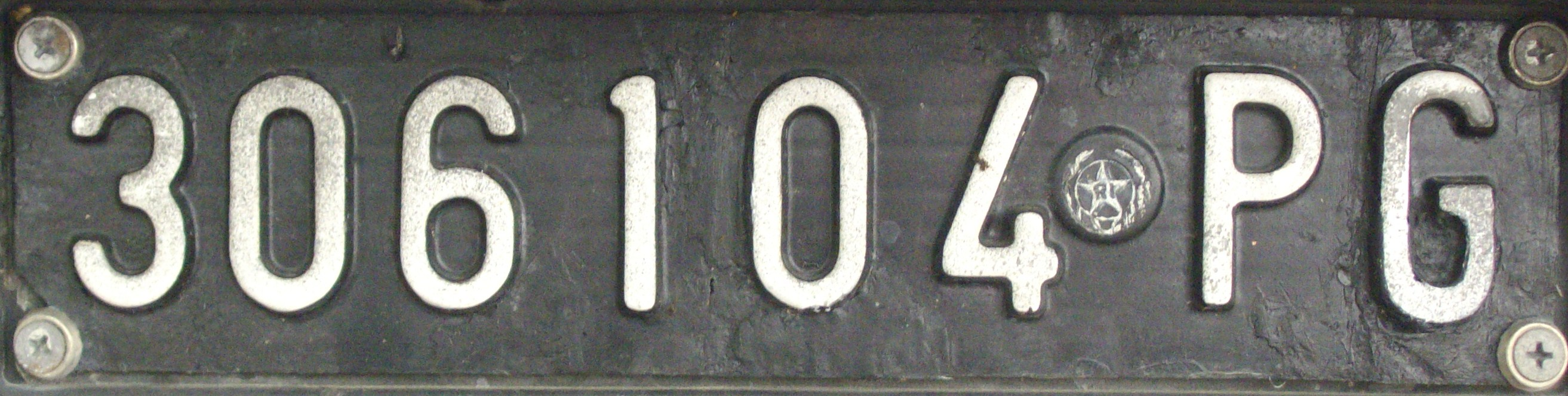
Front registration plate from 1951 to 1985. Note that the digits were placed before the provincial code. PG is the provincial code of Perugia.

From 1951 to 1976, the rear square plate was reduced to 275 × 200 mm, and a single line rear registration plate (similar to the ones used by other European countries) was not still available. The front plate was reduced to 262 × 57 mm and was redesigned with more linear characters and a smaller Italian Republic emblem. Starting from 1963, the material of the plates switched from metal to plastic. The scheme was the same introduced in 1927, a universal two-letter provincial code and a progressive numeric code up to 6 characters long unique to that province. On the rear plate, the Italian Republic emblem was placed between the provincial code and the first two digits.

The code for the first 999,999 vehicles of any province was just a progressive number, not filled with initial zeroes; in the rear plate the last four digits were placed in the second row and the first ones, if present, in the first row. From 1,000,000 onwards, it was A00000–A99999, then B00000–B99999, and so on. Possible letters were, in this order, A B D E F G H K L M N P R S T U V Z X Y W. After that, it was 00000A–99999A, 00000D–99999D, and so on. Possible letters were, in this order, A D E F G H L M N P R S T V W X Y Z. Then, the letter was moved to the second position, and then to the third (same range as in the second position).

Schematic representation
Rear plate

LI 16
0116

Front plate

160116 LI

1927–1932 rear plate

10122 ROMA

=== 1976–1985 ===
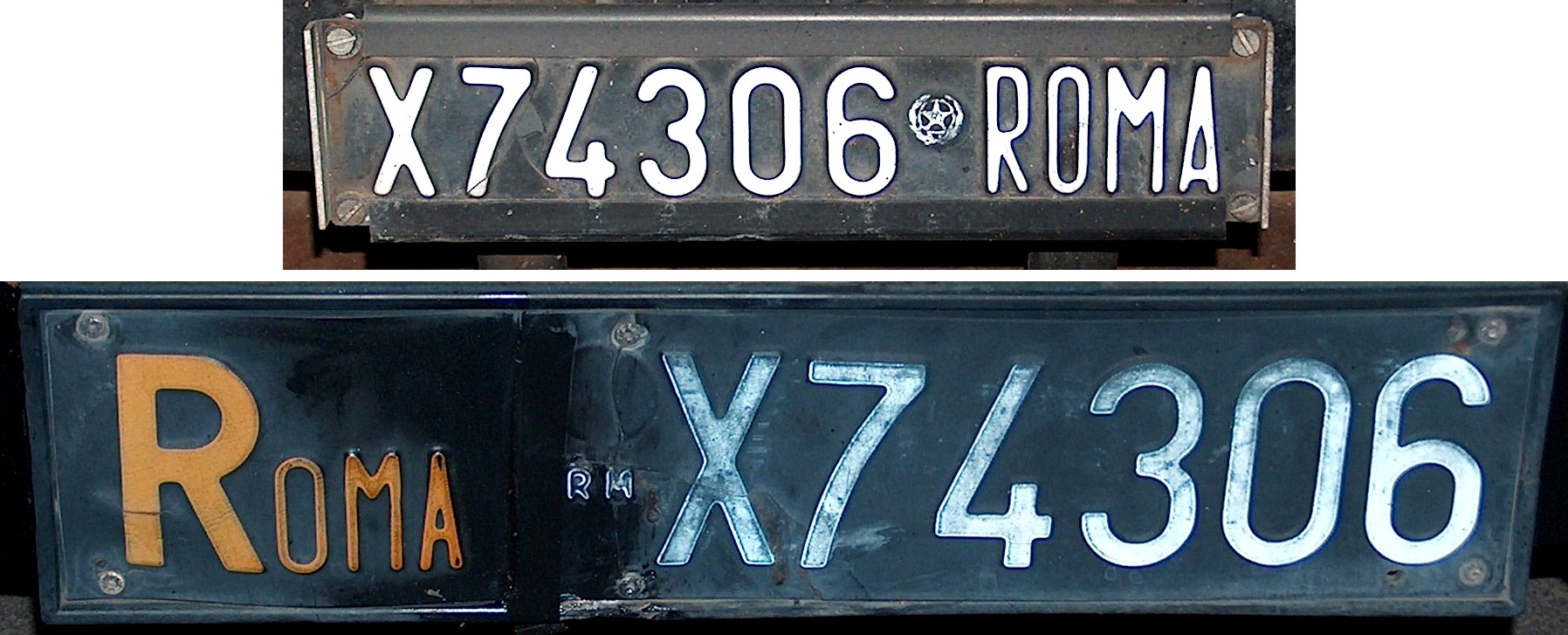
1976-1985 front and rear Italian car number plates. ROMA is the provincial code of Rome.

The front plate was kept intact as in the 1927-1976 period, but the rear plate instead began to be manufactured in two pieces. One, sized 10.7 × 33 cm, had black background with white digits and contained the progressive number and, in a small font above the progressive number, the repetition of the provincial code, as well as the Republic emblem. The other had black background with orange letters and contained the official provincial code and had two variants: one measuring 10.7 × 33 cm and another measuring 10.7 × 20 cm. Only one of the latter two was used depending on the type of plate holder that the plate was intended for: for a rectangular plate holder, the small provincial code piece was installed left of the progressive code, put together with rivets in specially designed holes in the progressive code. For cars that were designed with the previous number plate holder (Square), or that were too small for a rectangular plate, the long provincial code piece was installed above the progressive code. This change resolved the plate positioning problem on cars of foreign production.

Schematic representations

Front plate

X74306 ROMA

Rear plate (rectangular)

ROMA RM X74306}

Rear plate (squared)

ROMA
RM X74306}

=== 1985–1994 ===
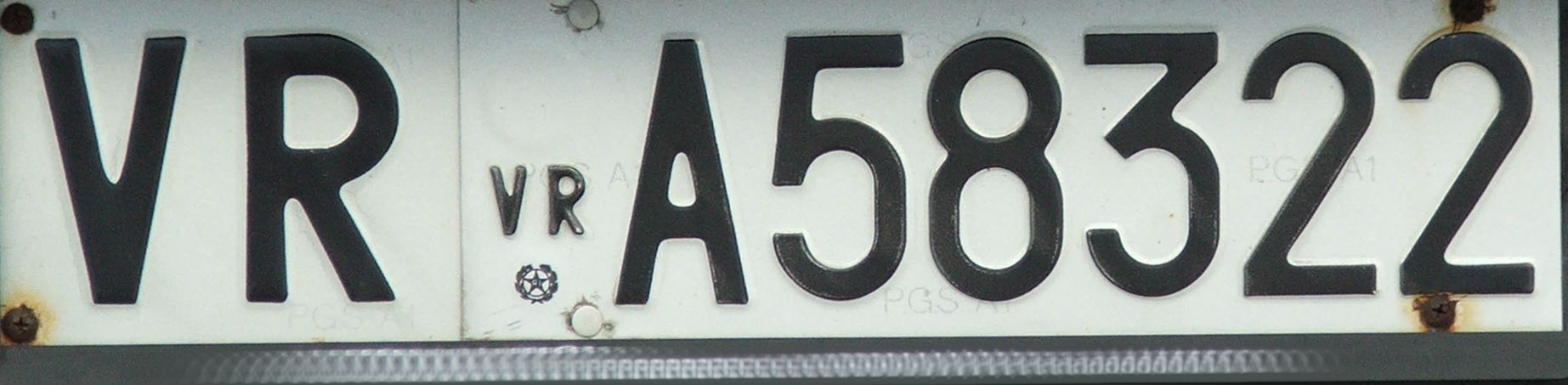
1985-1994 Italian rear car number plate. VR is the provincial code of Verona.

In 1985, plates began to use black digits on a reflective white background. Rear plates remained identical to those used between 1976 and 1985. Front plates became larger (32.5 cm × 10.7 cm, 12.8 in × 4.2 in) but remained slightly smaller than rear plates. The progressive number was moved after the provincial code, as it was already for rear plates.

The reflective background had an official code that appears on the background in small letters, PGS B1 or PGS A1, PGS referring to the Provveditorato Generale dello Stato, A or B to the city of manufacture, and 1 or 2 referring to the color of the background, white and yellow respectively.

This new system required progressive numbers with less than six digits to use initial zeroes.

The highest combination reached with the 1927 system was MI 01D000 for the province of Milan on 28 February 1994, the same day plates using the new system began to be issued.

Rear plate (rectangular)

VR A58322

Front plate

VR A58322

Rear plate (squared)

MI
1K4457

=== 1994–present ===
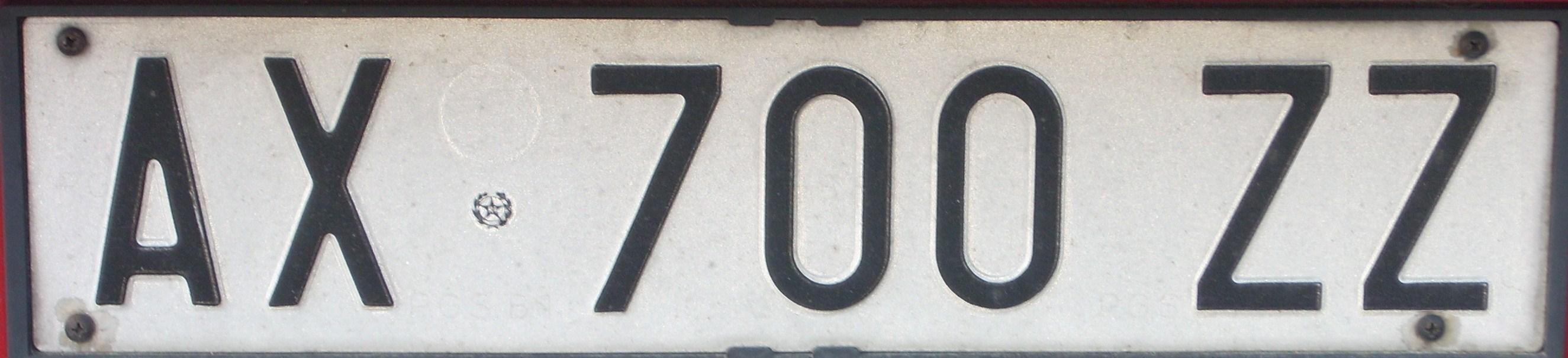
1994-1999 Italian rear number plate, without blue strips.

From 28 February 1994, an entirely new numeration system was introduced which omitted any explicit reference to the place of origin. Instead, an alphanumeric serial code was used, taking the form of AA 999 AA. Here 'A' can be any letter of the Latin alphabet except I, O, Q, and U and is treated as a base-22 digit; 9 can be any decimal digit. e.g. AK 514 RH, AX 848 LK, BA 924 NS. The three-digit number changes first, then the letters from right to left, such that consecutively issued plates would have codes of AA 000 AA...AA 999 AA, then AA 000 AB...AA 999 AZ, then AA 000 BA...AA 999 ZZ and so on. Provinces that were established in 1992 (namely Lecco, Verbano-Cusio-Ossola, Vibo Valentia, and Lodi) were given the option to issue either the old 1927 system plates or the 1994 standard until 1999.

Rear plates were redesigned to be a single piece, and a square plate was introduced for vehicles with a squared plate holder. Squared rear plates used exclusively serial codes with an initial Z.

1999-present Italian vehicle number plate from Bolzano.

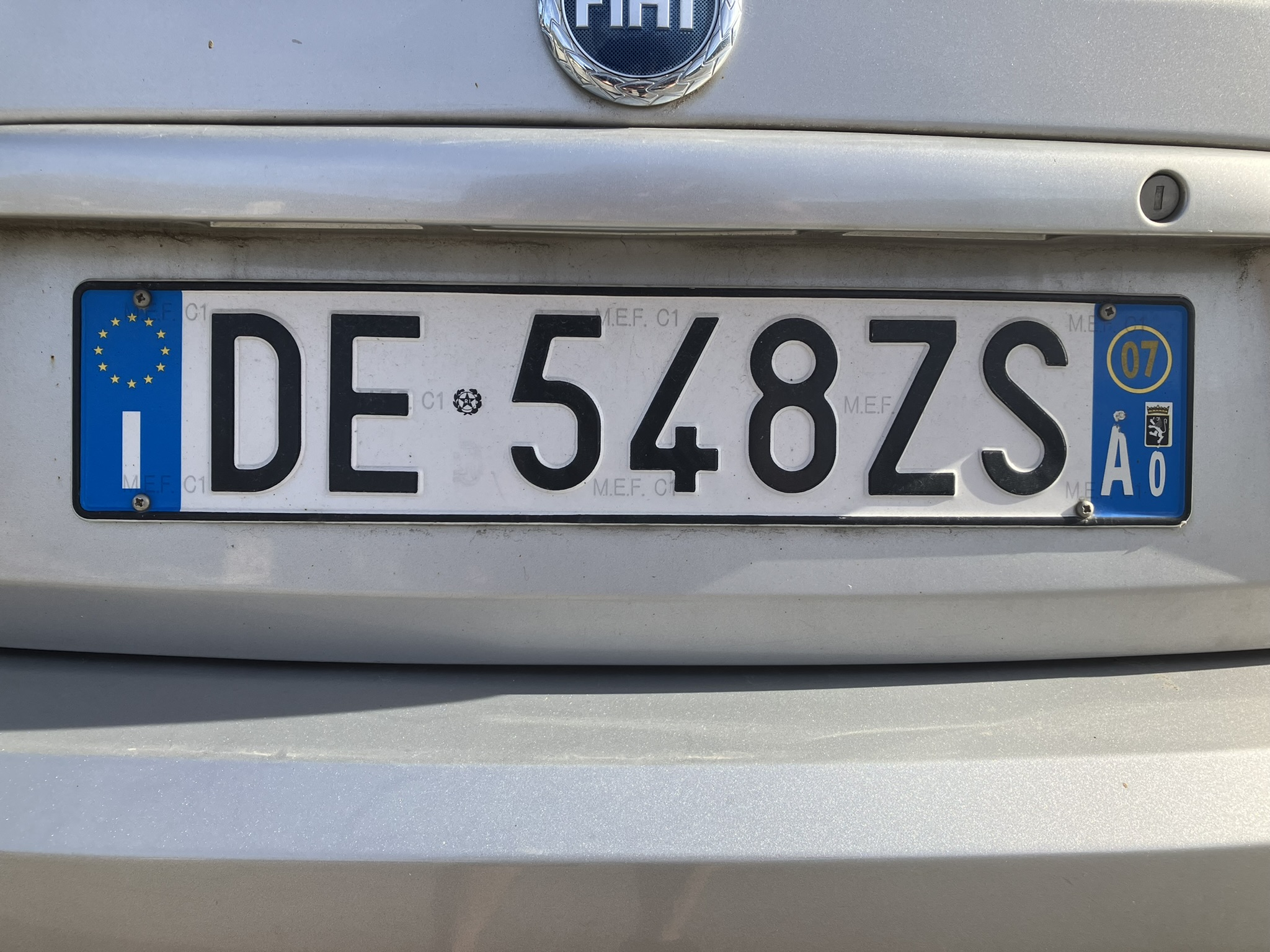
1999-present Italian vehicle number plate from the Aosta Valley.

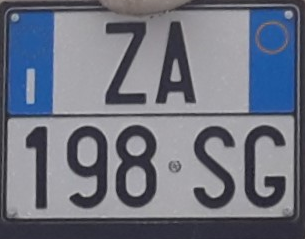
1999-present Italian square rear vehicle number plate.

In 1999, the plates were redesigned, starting from the serial code BB 000HH. The font thickness of the digits was increased, and the space between the rightmost number and the following letter was removed. The standard European blue band was added on the left side, with the European flag motif (12 yellow stars) and the country code I. Another blue band was added on the right side, bearing a yellow circle and optionally the final two digits of the year of registration.

The two-letter provincial code is optionally present on the right band in capital letters. For the capital city of Rome, the word Roma replaces the two-digit provincial code. Provincial codes are in capital letters except for the provincial codes of the autonomous provinces of Bolzano (Bz) and Trento (Tn) and the autonomous region Aosta Valley (Ao), for which the second letter is expressed in small capital letters and surmounted by the local coat of arms.

The reintroduction of the provincial code (although no longer as a compulsory element of the plate) was implemented because the 1994 suppression of the two-letter provincial codes proved extremely unpopular. Unlike before, the provincial code is not part of the registration number, which is the same for the whole nation. Despite an initial period of popularity, the right band remains empty in most cases.

Since 2003, the PGS B1 or PGS A1 code has been replaced by the code MEF B1 or MEF A1, MEF now referring to the Ministero dell'Economia e delle Finanze.

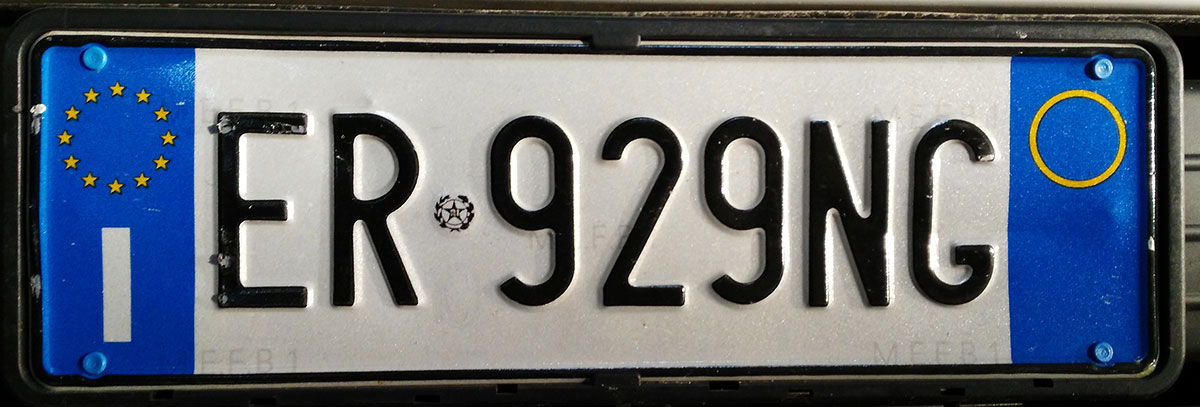
Plate with empty right band

Schematic representations
AE·170 HJ	1994–1999 plate
CZ·898NF Bz	Current registration plate from Bolzano
HE·900YD	Current 2026 registration plate
ZA / MI; 904·SZ	Square registration plate from Milan

1994–1998 squared rear number plate

ZA
563 DE

== Special plates ==
=== Motorcycle plates ===
==== 1994 standard ====
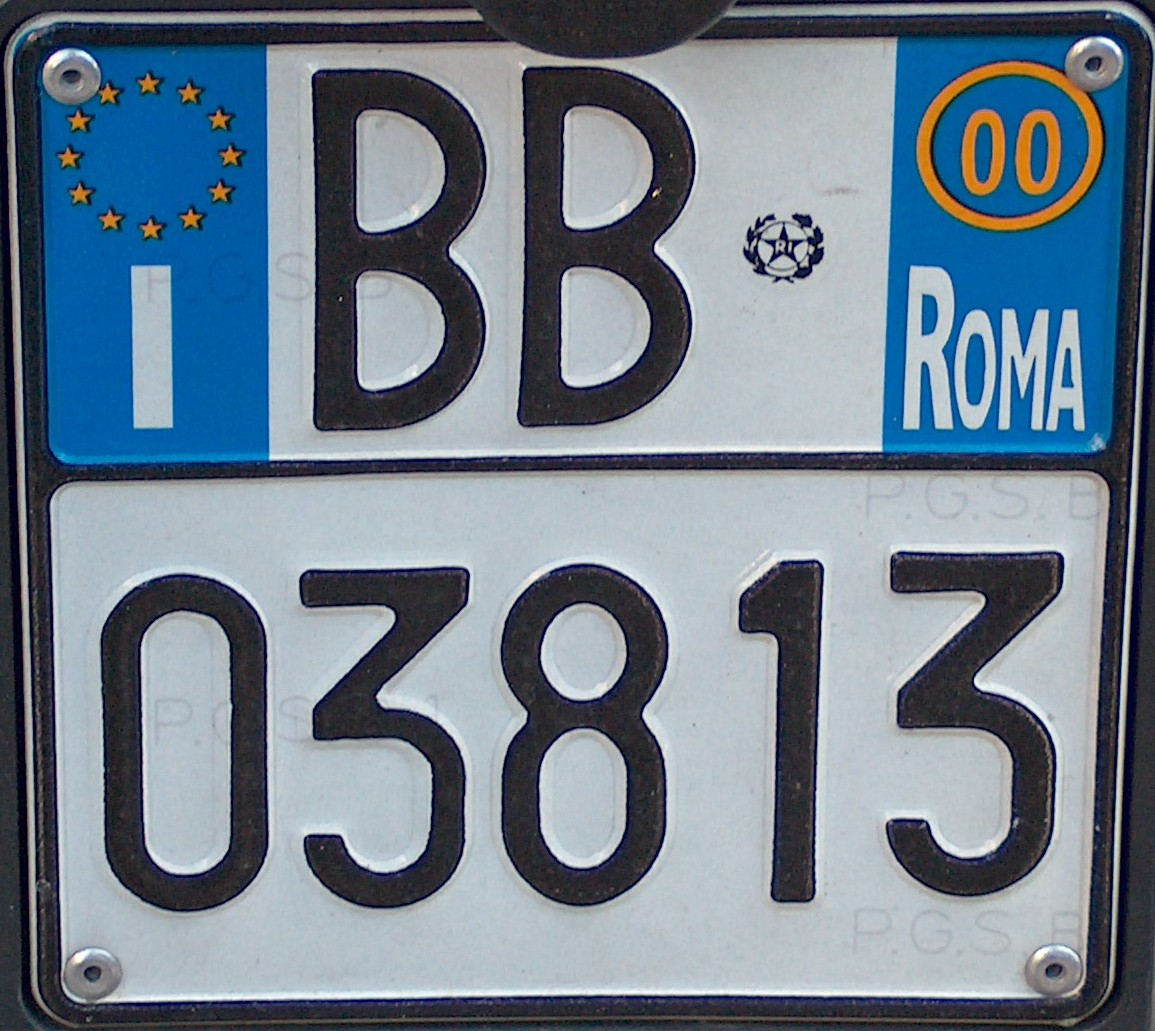
Motorbike license plate from Rome

Motorcycles from 1999 have plates with two letters and five digits, starting from AA 00000. For these vehicles, the province codes are not used to avoid confusion (e.g. the plate after AF 99999 is AH 00000, because AG is the old provincial code for Agrigento). Plate size is 177 mm × 177 mm (7 in × 7 in).

Like cars, motorcycles have two blue lateral bands on either side of the plate. On the left is Italy's band under the standard EU format, while on the right, the blue band has a yellow circle with the final two digits of the year of registration and underneath, the optional provincial code.

From 1994 to 1999, motorcycles did not have the blue bands, and the first digit was on the right of the first two letters.

Due to the large quantity of old provincial system plates, the 1994 system motorcycles plates began to be issued from 1996.

BB	ROMA
03813

1994–1999 motorcycle standard

AD 1
0013

==== Former provincial code system (1927–1994) ====
From 1927 until 1994, motorcycles used to have, like cars, the Provincial Code instead of the two letters on two lines, followed by a maximum of 6 digits.

Between 1927 and 1932, Motorcycles used to have white digits on a black background and the provincial code was after the digits on the second line, in 1932 (to 1985) the motorcycle plates changed to a white background with blue digits, the provincial code was moved before the digits and like cars, Motorcycles used the Garamond font until 1951.

In 1951, motorcycles, unlike cars, had a font transition that was completed in 1963, when plates started to be made of plastic but keeping the old format.

From 1985 to 1994, motorcycles changed to a white reflective background and black digits and returned to be made of metal

Example of 1932-1985 Motorcycle plate from the province of Milan

MI 65
0116

1927–1932 motorcycle plate

2345
MI

1985–1994 motorcycle plate

MI 80
9970

=== Moped plates ===
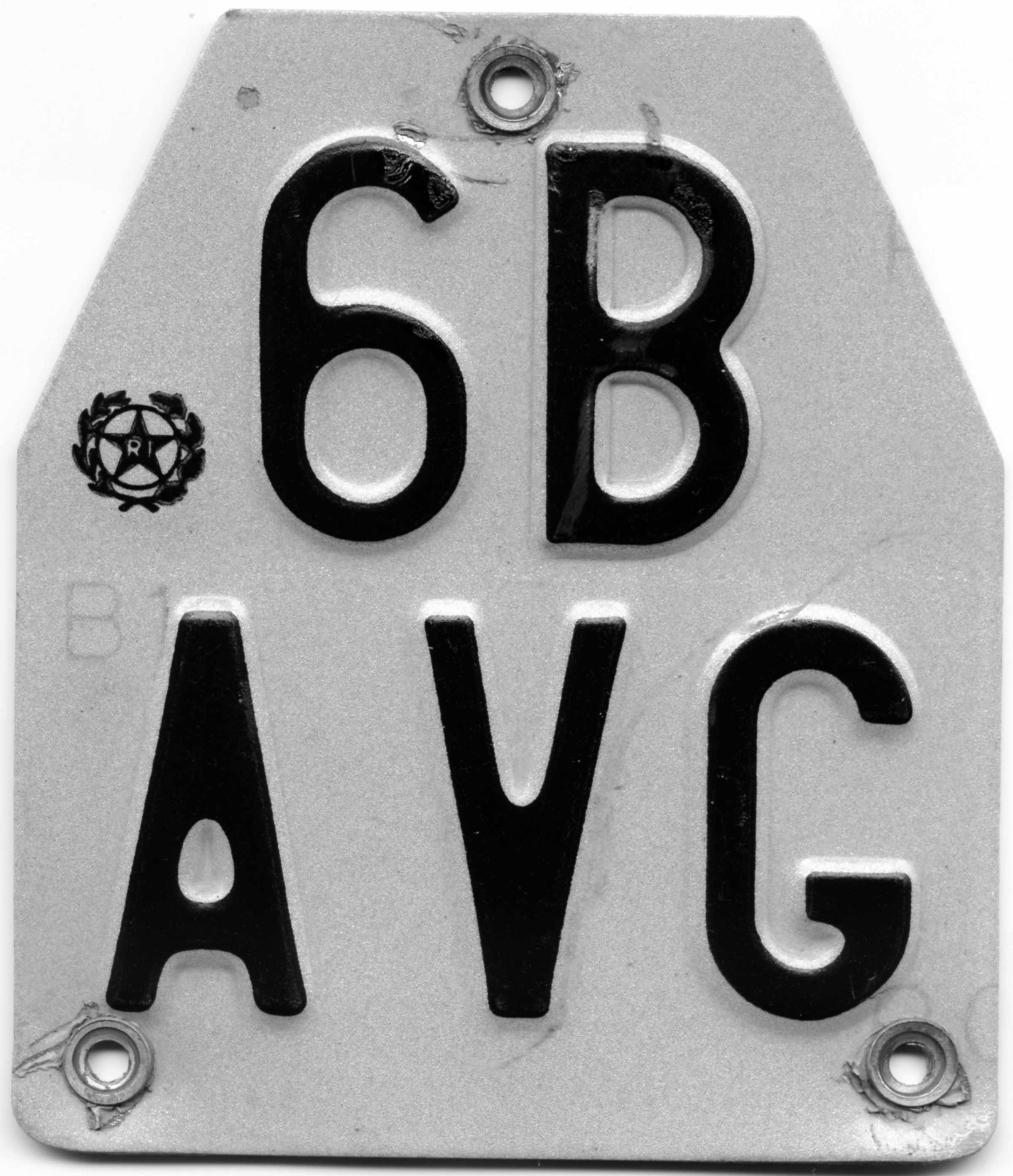
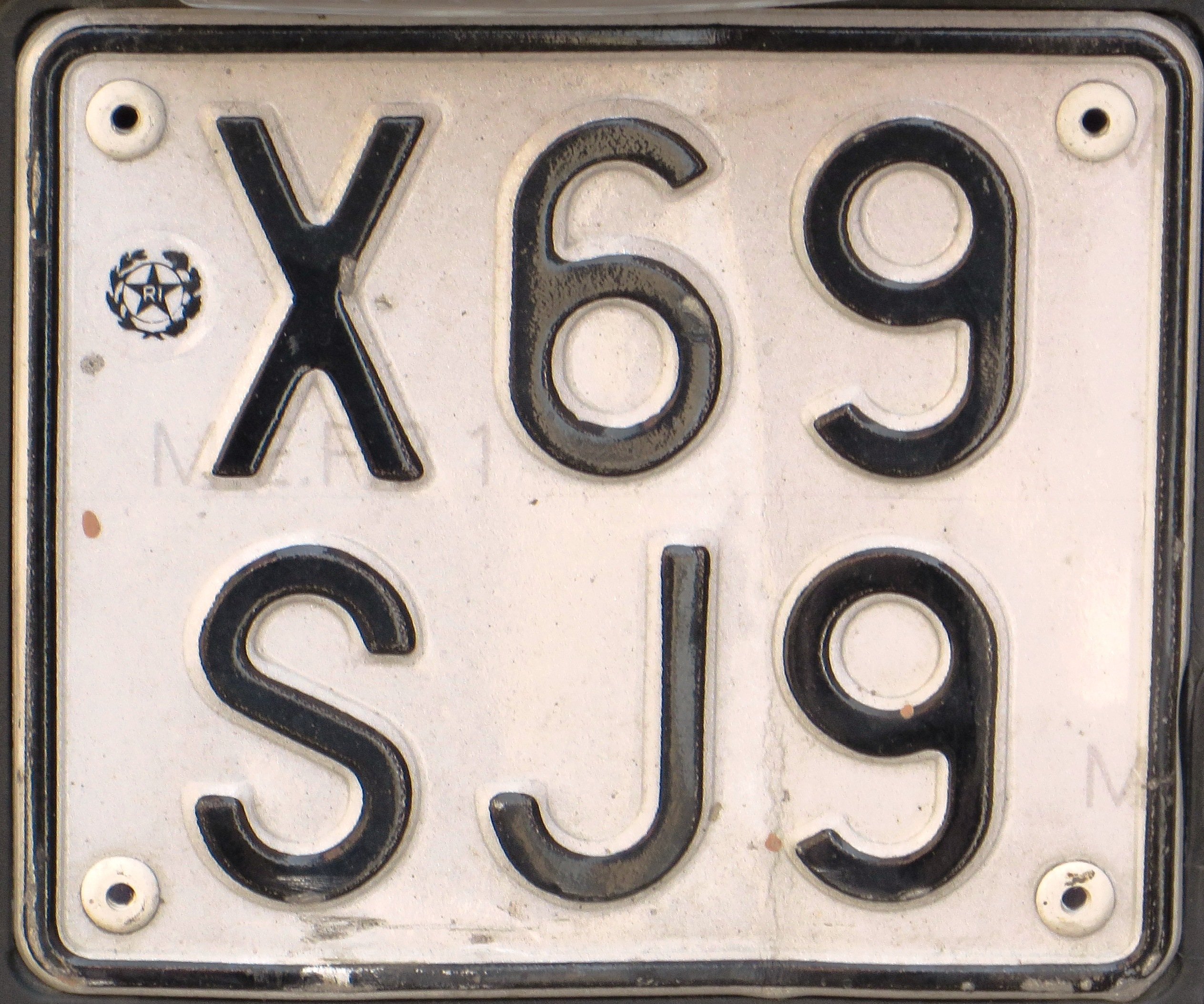
Old (left) and new (right) moped plates

Registration plates of small mopeds were introduced in 1994; before that date Italian mopeds did not require a plate. They were trapezoid-shaped and had a registration system based on a five letter-and-digit combination (treated as a 31-base numeric system), with the first two placed on top and the following three below (such as 47 A23 or K3 561 or 8X 4RF, whereby whole sets of series were assigned locally). In 2006 new moped plates were introduced; new plates have a rectangular shape measuring 12 by 14 cm. The registration shows six characters: the first is always "X" ("Y" for Local Police plates), the other five follows the same scheme as the old system; however the digit 1 and 0 and the letters A, E, I, O, Q and U are not used. Since 2012 old moped plates are no longer valid and have to be replaced by new ones.

The reason for the change was that with the old moped system, the plate could be transferred to another moped and was bound to the owner rather than the vehicle, whereas the new plates are bound to the vehicle.

=== Trailer plates ===
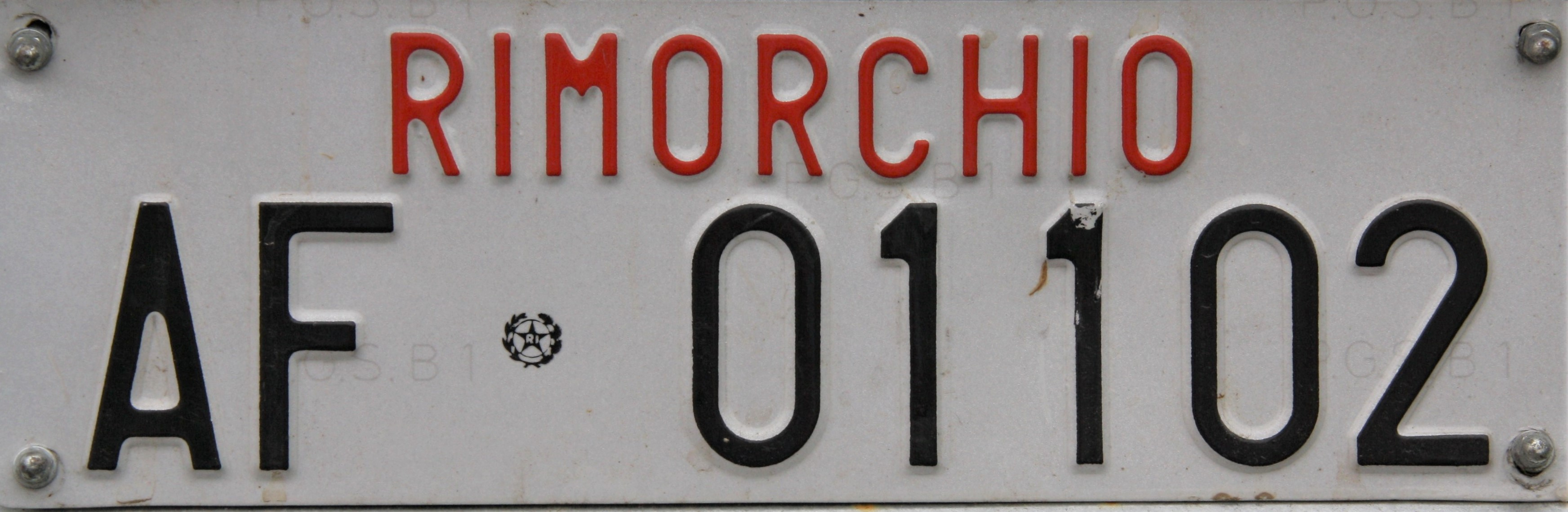
Trailer plate until 2013

Car and truck trailers had two plates: the trailer's own one was quite small and bore the word "RIMORCHIO" (trailer) and a two letters-five digit code, the other had the same size of vehicles' rear plates and bore the same registration of the prime mover with black decal-characters on a retroflective yellow base. From February 2013 new trailer plates were introduced: they use the same pattern of standard vehicle plates, the numeric scheme is XL 000 LL where "L" is a generic letter, "0" is a digit and "X" is the reserved letter. Mover repetition plates are no longer needed on trailers registered with new plates, however they are still compulsory for old trailers with small plates and small unregistered "appendix trailers".

From 1932 to 1959, trailer plates were the same as car plates (white digits on a black background), only with the word "RIMORCHIO" under the numbers, written in italic.

After 1959 to 1985, the trailer plates were similar to front vehicle number plates (black background with white digits), with the digits before the provincial code, with the word "RIMORCHIO" above the digits followed by the provincial code.

From 1985 until 1994, the trailer plates were enlarged, had black digits on a white reflective background with the provincial code before the digits and the word "RIMORCHIO" assumed red coloration. Until 1993 they had to be displayed on the right of the trailer.

Trailer plate schematic representation (2013)

XA 123 AA MI

1994–2013 trailer plate

RIMORCHIO
AA 21633

1985–1994 trailer plate

RIMORCHIO
MI 121633

1959–1985 trailer plate

RIMORCHIO
53043 MI

1932–1959 Trailer plate

MI 2456
Rimorchio

=== Police plates ===
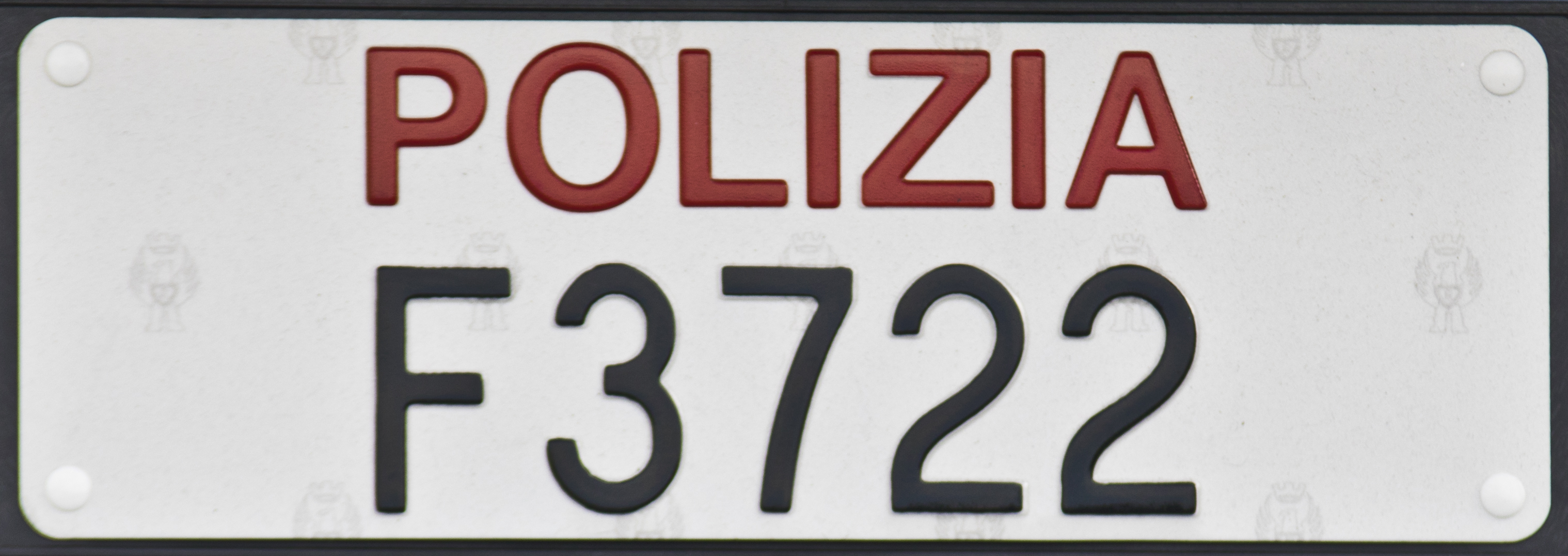
Registration Plate of Italian State Police

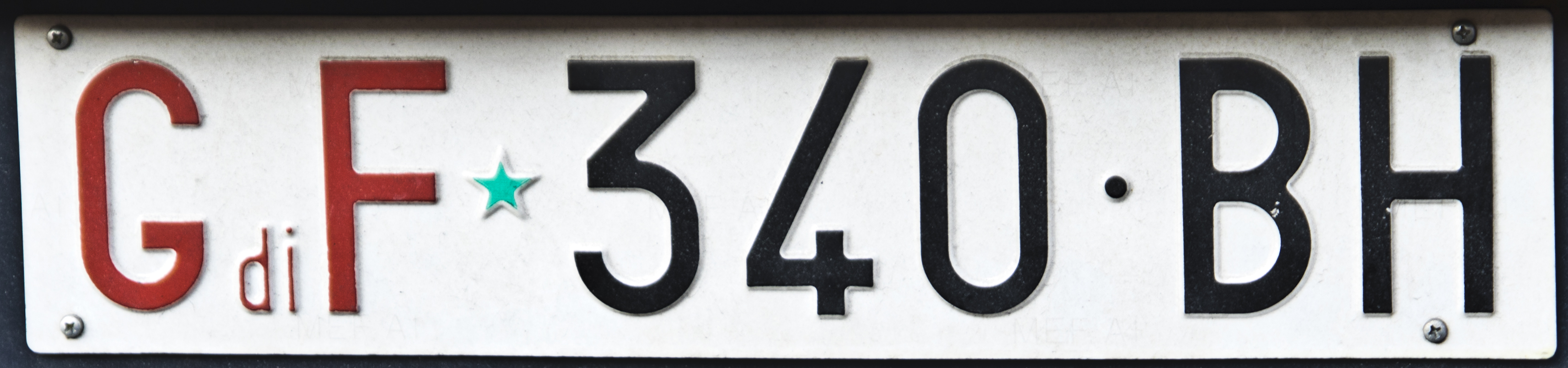
Registration Plate of Italian Revenue Police

Local police forces have the word "POLIZIA LOCALE" (local police) in blue. They have the same pattern as trailer and civilian plates, the scheme is YL 000 LL where "L" is a letter, "0" is a digit and the "Y" is the reserved letter (for motorcycles YL 00000, mopeds Y00 000). Unlike civilian plates they do not show up the code. National police plates have "POLIZIA" in red followed by letter, then numbers (formerly numbers only until 1983). Customs police plates start with prefix "GdiF" in red. The serial letters and three serial numbers are in black.

Pre-1983 National Police rear plate

POLIZIA
21633

Pre-1983 front National Police plate

POLIZIA 21633

Post-1983 National Police plate

POLIZIA
F3722

Post-1983 Guardia di Finanza (customs) plate

GdiF 340 BH

2009 local police plates

YA 124 AA CO

=== Diplomatic plates ===
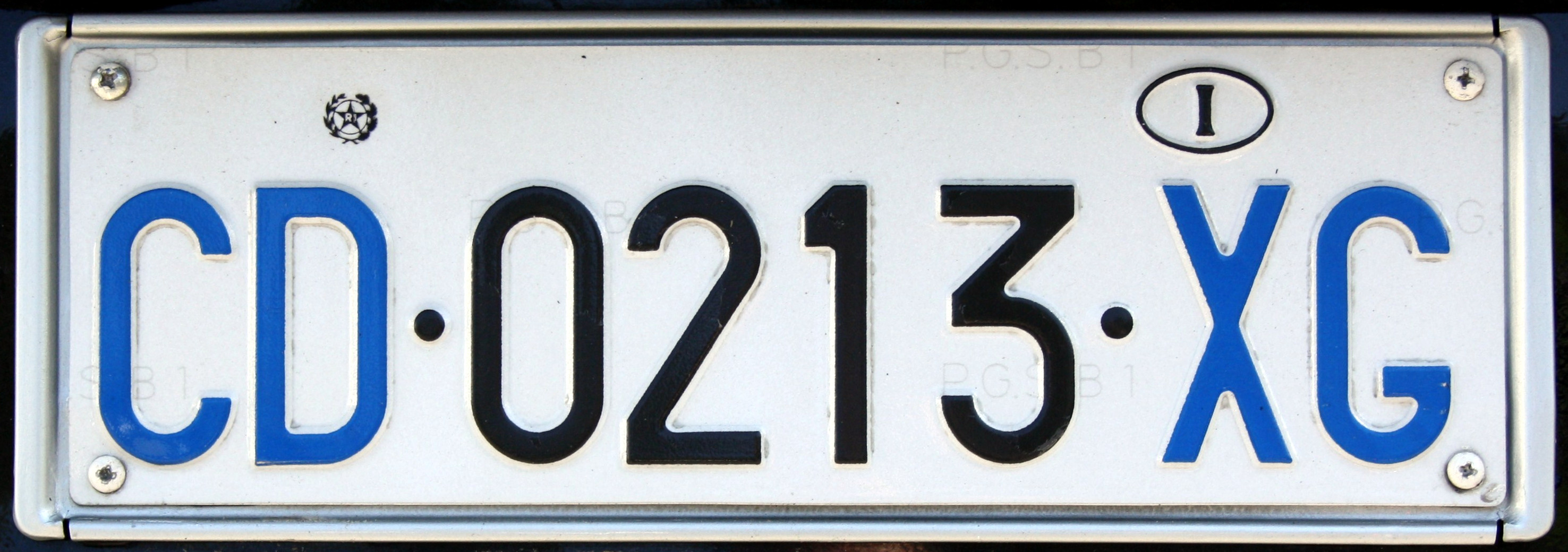
Current Registration Plate of Corpo Diplomatico from Vatican City (XG) since 1995

From 1932 until 1951, diplomatic plates are square 32.0 x 22.0 cm, white digits on a black background using the Garamond font with the "CD" prefix instead of the province followed by a max of 5 digits, the first two digits was the country's code.

Through 1951 to 1976, diplomatic plates are square 27.5 x 20.0 cm, white digits on black background, changed to a more linear font, but the system was identical from the previous period.

ex: CD 22843

From 1976 to 1985, diplomatic plates are on a single line, black background with white digits, with the letters "CD" vertically aligned, followed by 5 digits, the first two represented the country, the other three a progressive number.

In 1985 until 1995, diplomatic plates have a white reflective background with black digits, with blue letters and change to a CD 000 AA system, with the letters representing the country.

The Italian Republic emblem appears on top of the first two letters of the plate and on the top right the international white oval with a black letter representing Italy's international code (I)

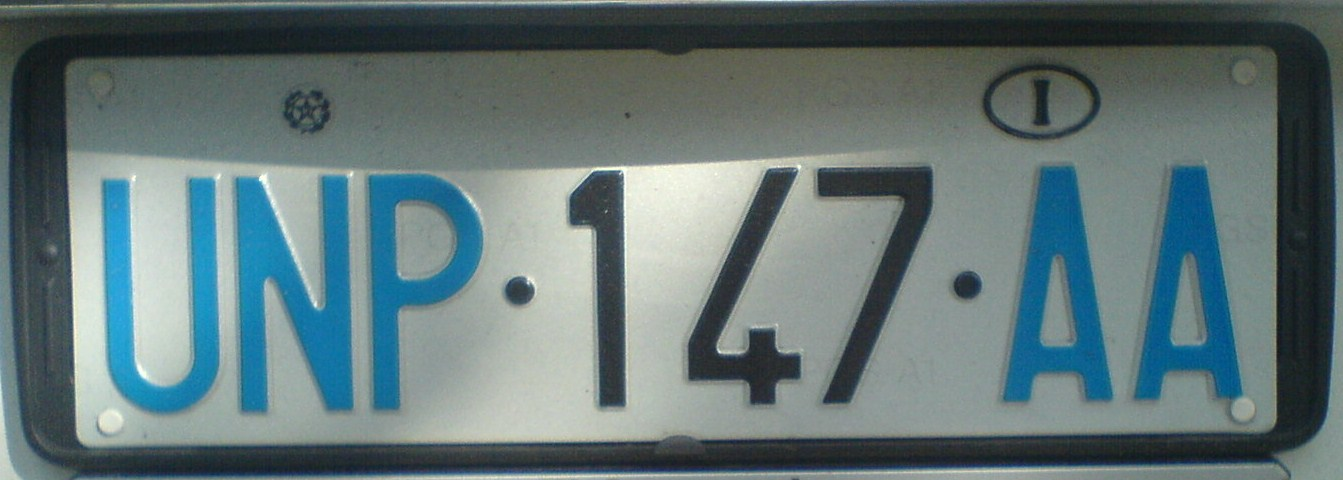
Registration Plate of Nazioni Unite (Specialists)

Diplomatic plates have blue letters since 1985 and have 4 numbers to avoid confusion with the new civilian plates issued since 1994. These have the "CC" (Corpo Consolare), "CD" (Corpo Diplomatico) and four numbers, while "UN" (Nazioni Unite (Permanent)), "UNP" (Nazioni Unite (Specialists)), and "UNT" (Nazioni Unite (Transit)) plates have three. Scheme is CC 0000 AA or UNP 000 AA. The "AA" is a country code (blue) while "0" is a digit. Front and rear plates are identical and both measure 34 by 11 cm.

There are no diplomatic motorcycle plates used.

Schematic representations
CD 0213 XG	Current diplomatic corps plate, XG is the code of Vatican City.
CC 0213 AF	Current Corpo consolare plate
CD 22926	Diplomatic plate issued from 1976 to 1985
CD 2; 6421	Diplomatic plate issued from 1932 to 1976
CD 213 AQ	1985–1995 diplomatic corps plate of France format still in use but no longer issued
UNP 147 AA	United Nations plate for specialists

=== Military plates ===
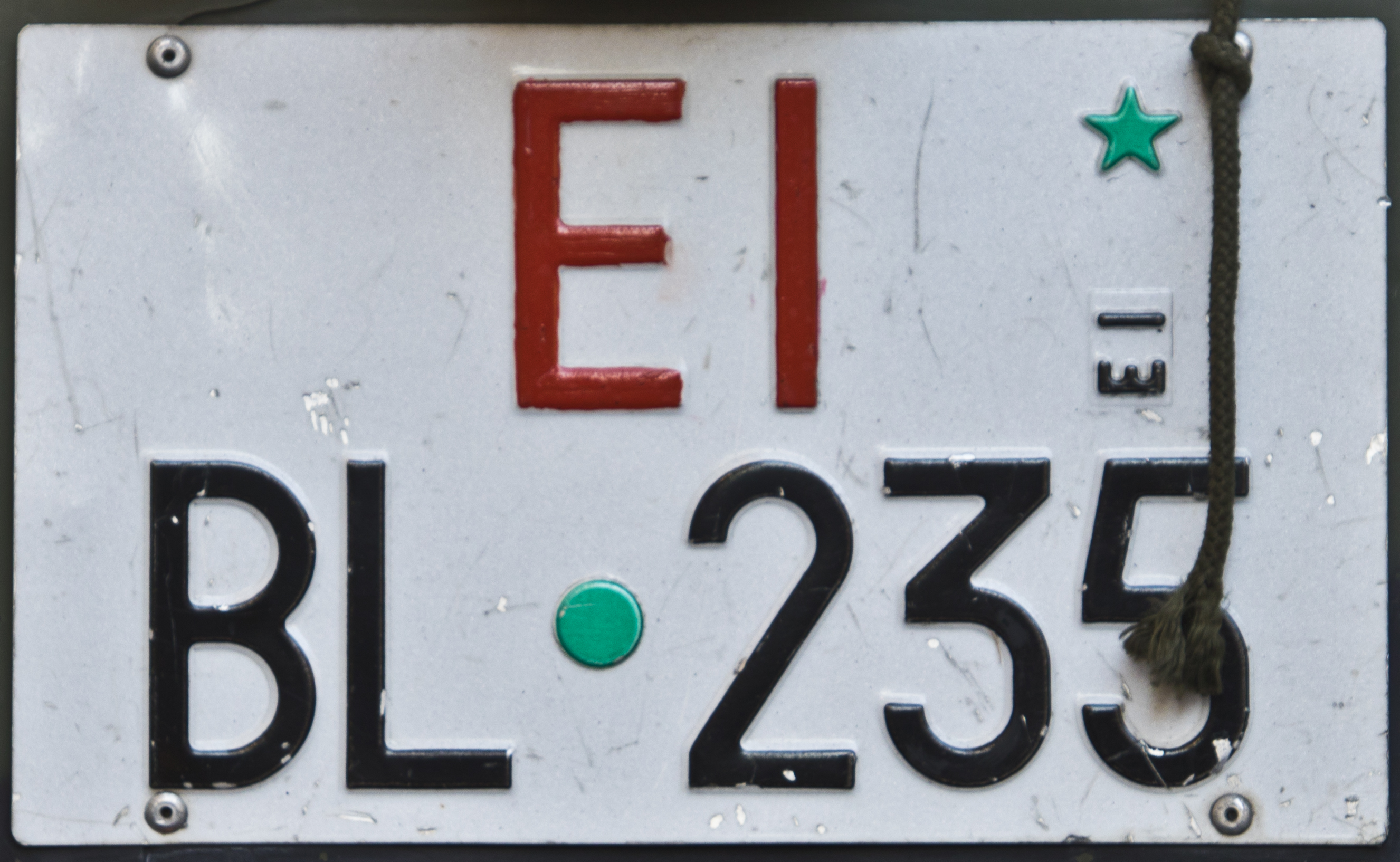
Registration Plate of Italian Army

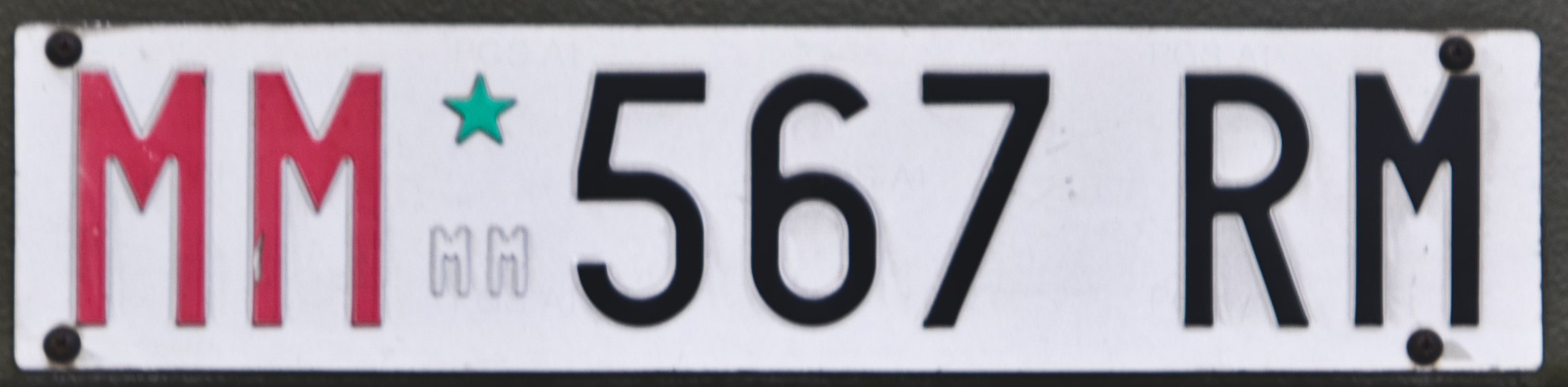
Registration Plate of Italian Navy

Military plates have the prefixes EI (Esercito Italiano, Army), AM (Aeronautica Militare, Air Force) and MM (Marina Militare, Navy), all of them red, with trailers having the indication Rimorchio. The regional code is small and written in black. The scheme is EI LL 000. While "EI" is the prefix, "LL" is a letter and "0" is a digit to prevent confusion with civilian plates issued from 1994. Between the letter and number there is a green dot. In 1980 Army plates adopted the 11 by 34 cm size for both front and rear plates, but more recent plates use the 1994–99 civilian plate standard for rear plates. Starting from 2004, historical military vehicles that no longer possess the original plate use instead the scheme EI VS 000, "VS" (Veicolo Storico) is colored green. Until 1995 army plates used an EI 000 AA system and before 1985 used an EI 000000 system with the same dimension of civilian plates (smaller front plate) where certain number ranges were reserved for types of vehicles EX: EI 900000 to EI 999999 were reserved to trailers and EI 400000 to 450000 were reserved for recon vehicles. However, the pre-1979 numbers only system is still used for armored vehicles and tanks.

Schematic representations
EI BL 235	Current Esercito Italiano plate
EI 234554	Pre-1985 Esercito Italiano plate
MM AB 123	Current Marina Militare plate
MM 567 RM	1985–1997 Marina Militare plate
MM 25550	Pre-1985 Marina Militare plate
EI 42; 0116	Pre-1976 Esercito Italiano Plate
EI VS 132	Historical Esercito Italiano plate

Current Army motorcycle plate

EI A
0351

Current Army Trailer plates

RIMORCHIO

EI AA 00

1979–1995 Army Trailer plates

EI R12 AE

Pre–1979 Army Trailer plates

EI R90
1209

=== Allied Forces in Italy (AFI) plates ===
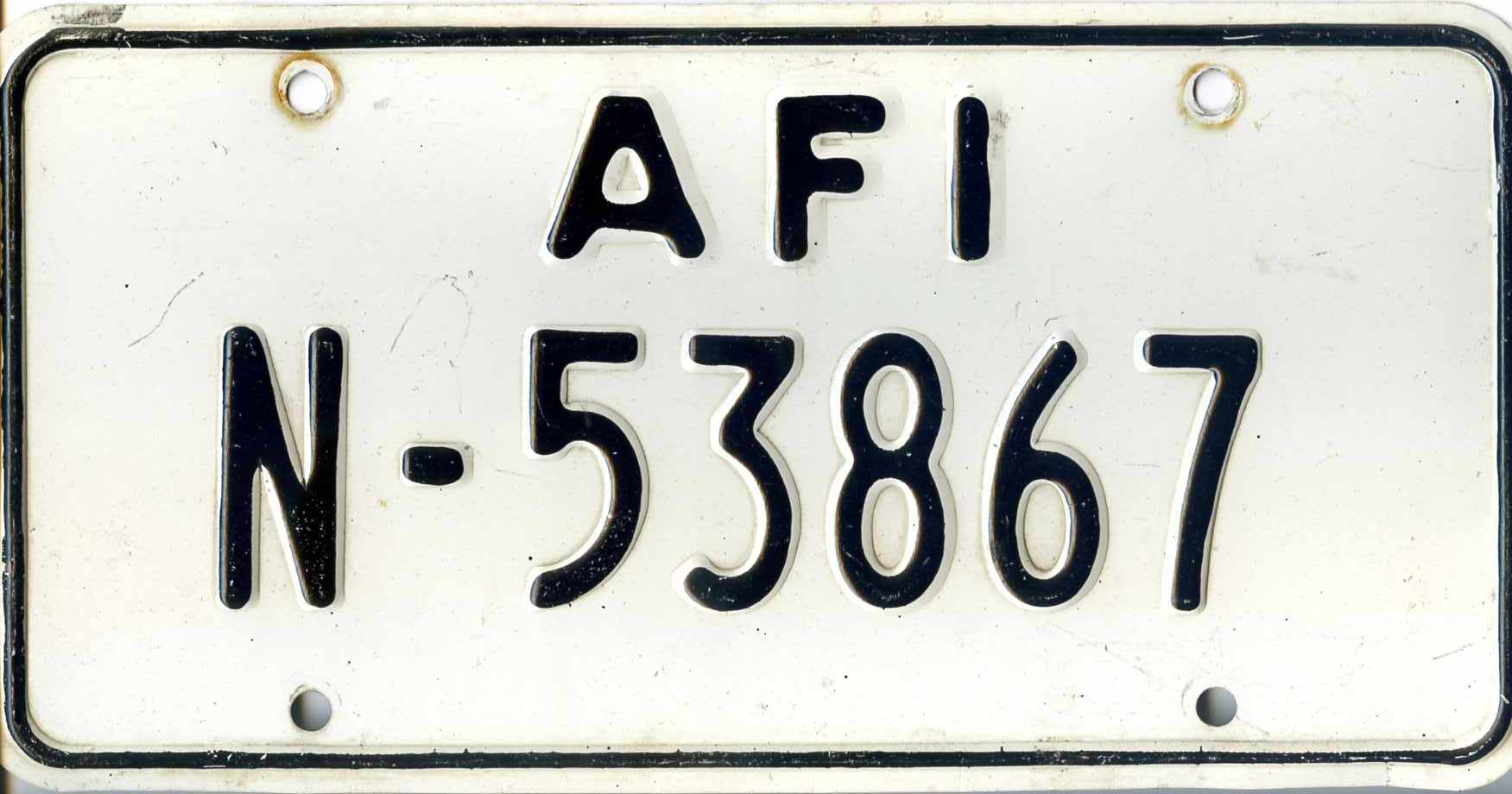

AFI plates are special plates issued to vehicles used by NATO military personnel stationed in Italy, particularly U.S. forces under the NATO umbrella. These plates are used instead of regular Italian plates to indicate the vehicle's military status and international affiliation.

The plate typically starts with the letters AFI, followed by a dash and a set of numbers (e.g., AFI-12345). The AFI code stands for Allied Forces Italy. AFI plates are commonly seen on vehicles driven by US military personnel and their families. Although they are legal in Italy, they can sometimes draw attention due to their distinct appearance and foreign status.

Regional Codes

(Not officially publicised but commonly observed through spotting and enthusiast communities): The first digit after AFI often corresponds to the region or base location:

- 2xxxx – Vicenza (Camp Ederle, Del Din – large U.S. Army presence)
- 4xxxx – Naples (Naval Support Activity Naples – U.S. Navy)
- 5xxxx – Aviano (Aviano Air Base – U.S. Air Force)
- 6xxxx – Gaeta (Navy Support Site, often linked to the 6th Fleet)
- 7xxxx – Sigonella, Sicily (Naval Air Station Sigonella – U.S. Navy)

(Note: These codes aren't officially confirmed by Italian or U.S. military sources but are widely accepted by plate spotters and military vehicle enthusiasts).

=== Red Cross plates ===
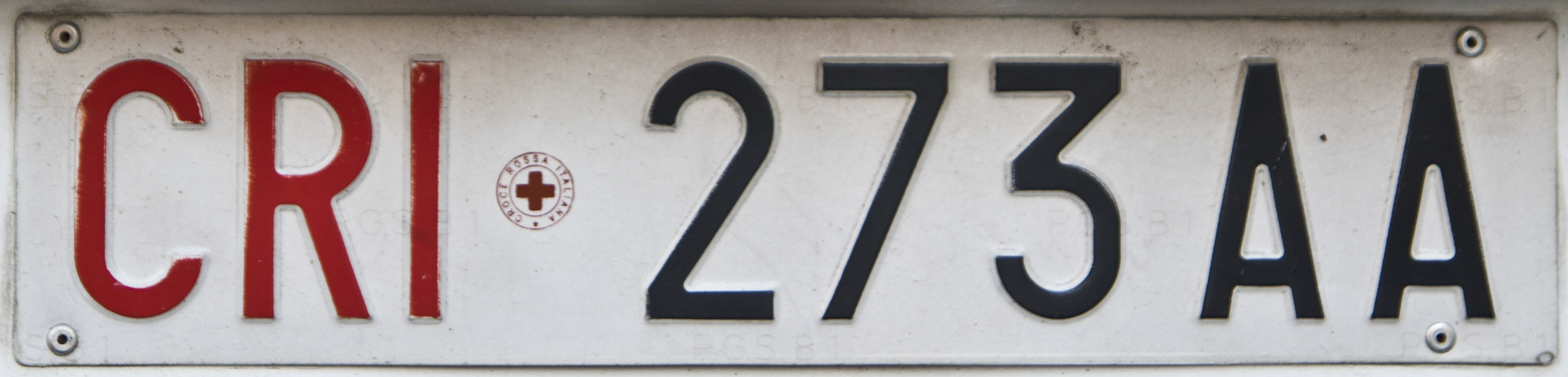
Registration Plate of Italian Red Cross

Have the prefix "CRI" (Croce Rossa Italiana) in red, the style is CRI 000LL (pre-2007 was CRI L000L, motorcycles CRI 00000), while "L" is a letter, and "0" is a number on a white reflective background. The Red Cross symbol is between "CRI" and the other characters. They use the same style of pre-1999 plates; the final code of two-line plates always starts with the letter "Z".

Trailer plates have the word Rimorchio above the digits using a CRI 0000 system.

Before 1985 Red Cross plates had a dot after each number and had the same format of civilian plates (smaller front plate)

Until 1985 Red Cross plates were numbers only; after the late seventies ambulances had to have the L000L format, while service cars continued to have numbers only until 2002 where all new Red Cross vehicles had to have the L000L system.

Schematic representations
C.R.I; 3235	Pre-1985 Red Cross Plate
CRI 1; 3235	Current Red Cross Motorcycle plate
CRI 12135	1985-2002 (late Seventies for ambulances)
CRI A 350 C	2002–2007 plate
CRI 273 AA	Current plate
CRI R 1343	Current trailer plate

=== Firefighters ===
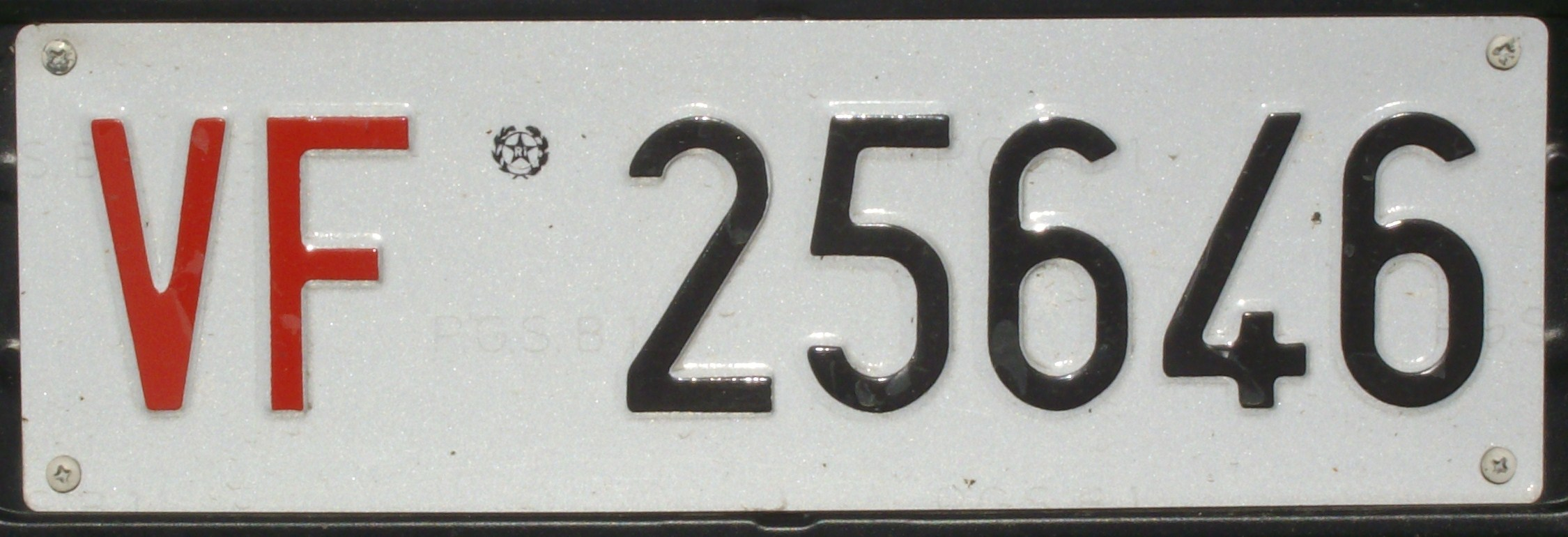
Registration plate of Italian National Fire Service

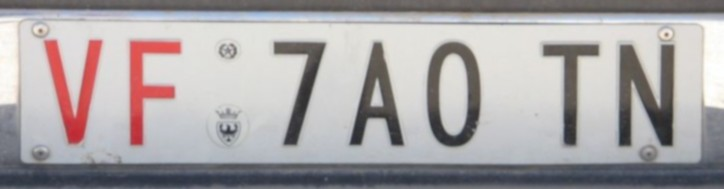
Registration plate of Trento Fire Service

Before 1938, firefighter's vehicles used civilian plates.

Since 1938, firefighter's plates have the prefix "VF" (Vigili del Fuoco) in red. They have the same style and dimension of Port Authority plates, but they do not have text in the bottom section. Firefighters of autonomous regions use special firefighter's plates issued locally. Their schemes were VF 0L0 AA (formerly VF L00 AA), where "AA" at the end can be TN or BZ. Trailers have small red "R" between prefix and numbers.

Schematic representations
VF 25646	National firefighters plate (except for autonomous provinces below)
VF R 1234	Trailer plate
VF 7A0 TN	Firefighter plate from Trento

=== Port Authority plates ===
Port Authority plates have the prefix "CP" (Capitaneria di Porto) in red, with the text "GUARDIA COSTIERA" at the bottom. These plates are considerably shorter than the standard (circa 35 by 52mm), front and rear plates are the same size and square rear plates are not available.

Schematic representation

CP 2378

=== SMOM plates ===
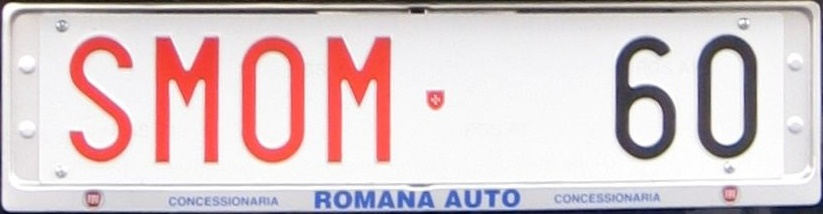
Vehicle registration plate of the Order, as seen in Rome, Italy.

Uses prefix "SMOM" (Sovrano militare ordine di Malta) in red, followed by two numbers (previously red). They have the text "SMOM" at the bottom. These plates used only by Sovereign Military Order of Malta members (only plate that was circulating on along with its diplomatic plate (code XA), being SMOM is a subject of international law.), and these plates were issued by Ministry of Defence.

Schematic representation

SMOM 60

=== Temporary plates ===
These plates are used for vehicles temporarily circulating in Italy, but have to be exported, "EE" stands for "Escursionisti Esteri" (foreign hikers or temporary plates).

They have the same style of Diplomatic plates, but they start with "EE" (black) instead of "CD". The upper part of the plate has a small space for accommodating expiry date stickers.

From 1932 to 1951, they are square 32.0 x 22.0 cm, white digits on a black background with Garamond font, using an EE 00000 system.

Between 1951 and 1976, they are square 27.5 x 20.0 cm, white digits on a black background with different font style and have the EE prefix instead of the province followed by a max of 5 digits ex: EE 10245

From 1976 until 1985, they are on a single line, white digits on a black background and the letters EE are vertically aligned, followed by a max of 5 digits.

Since 1985, they are on a single line, black digits on white reflective background with the EE 000 AA system.

Motorcycles had the "EE" on the first line then 4 digits on the second line, white background with blue digits from 1932 to 1985 and have the sticker space above the republic emblem. From 1985 motorcycles have the prefix followed by a letter and a progressive number.

Schematic representation

EE 053 AM

Temporary series from 1976 to 1985

EE 52926

Temporary series from 1932 to 1976

EE 1
5322

Temporary motorcycle plates from 1932 to 1985

EE
7642

Temporary motorcycle plates from 1985

EE
D881

=== Agricultural plates ===
Agricultural machines have motorcycle-sized plates following the AA-0/00A scheme written in black on yellow. Agricultural trailers have the text "RIM AGR." in red on the upper part. Agricultural trailers have to show both their own plates and a prime mover repetition one.

Agricultural plates from 1994

AA 1
53C

Agricultural trailer plates from 1994

RIM. AGR.
AA 000A

Agricultural trailer plates from 1985 to 1994

RIM. AGR.
PV 1423

Agricultural trailer plates from 1959 to 1985

RIM. AGR.
5341 MI

Agricultural plates from 1948 to 1985

AR 1
9134

Agricultural plates from 1985 to 1994

NO 3
4134

Repeater plate used from 1985 to 1994

NOR3
4134

Repeater plate from 1994

AA R1
13A

=== Road machinery plates ===
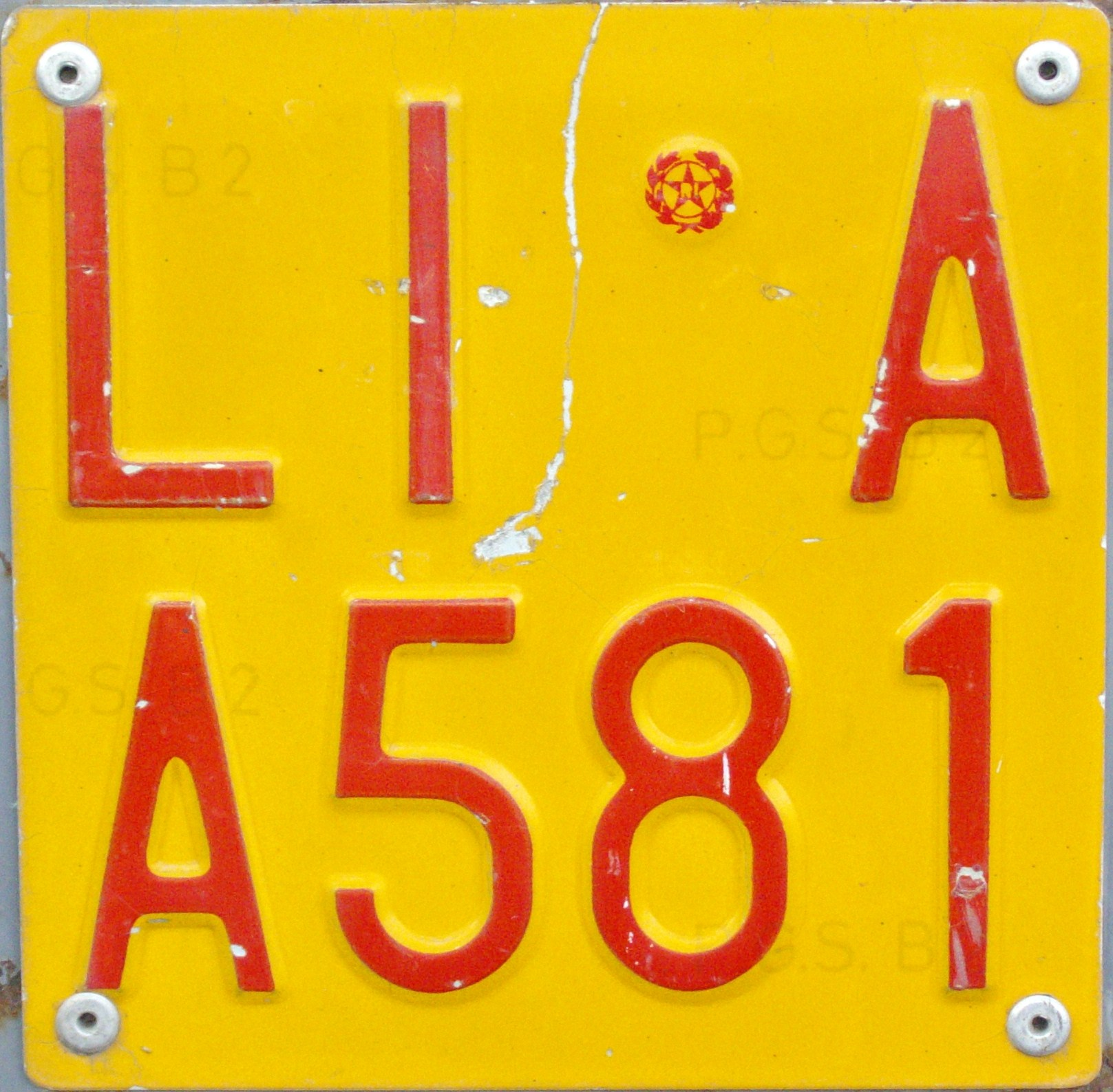
Old registration plate of road machinery vehicle (1992–1994)

The style of these plates is LL LNNN. They are square, with red text on a yellow background. They were introduced in 1992, until 1994 they used a LL LLNNN system, where the first two letters were the provincial code. Due to the low road machinery plates assigned, provinces had been distributing the old system plates over the course of many years before the new ones appeared.

Road machinery plate from 1992 to 1994

LI A
A581

Current road machinery plate

AE J
134

1992–1994 trailed road machinery plate

MACC. OP.
AP A0652

Current trailed road machinery plate

MACC. OP.
AD A 652

=== Civil Defence plates ===
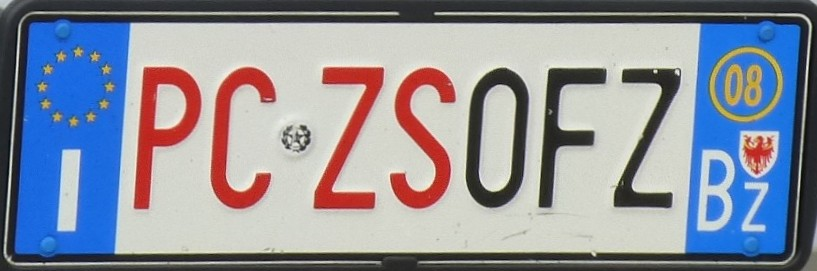
Registration plate of Bolzano Emergency Management Agency

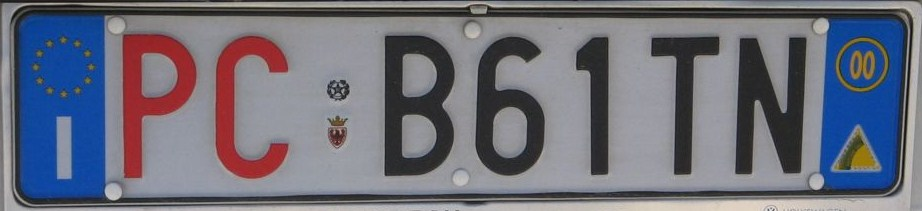
Registration plate of Trento Emergency Management Agency

These plates only exist in autonomous regions, with the prefix "PC" (Protezione Civile) in red and an alphanumeric serial chosen by local authorities (PC ZS0LL in Bolzano (where ZS stands for Zivilschutz in German), PC L00TN in Trento). Cars of the national Civil Defence department have special plates bearing "DPC" (Dipartimento della Protezione Civile) followed by an alphanumeric serial (DPC L 0000) in Rome, while operative vehicles usually use civil plates. Emergency plates have the text at the top:"DIPARTIMENTO PROTEZIONE CIVILE RICOVERO DI EMERGENZA", then a provincial designator and four numbers.

Schematic representations
DPC X 1234	Dipartimento della Protezione Civile plate
PC ZS0FZ Bz	Civil Defense plate from Bolzano
PC B61TN ?	Civil Defence plate from Trento
DIPARTIMENTO; PROTEZIONE CIVILE; RICOVERO DI EMERGENZA; RM 0123	Emergency shelter plate

=== Carabinieri plates ===
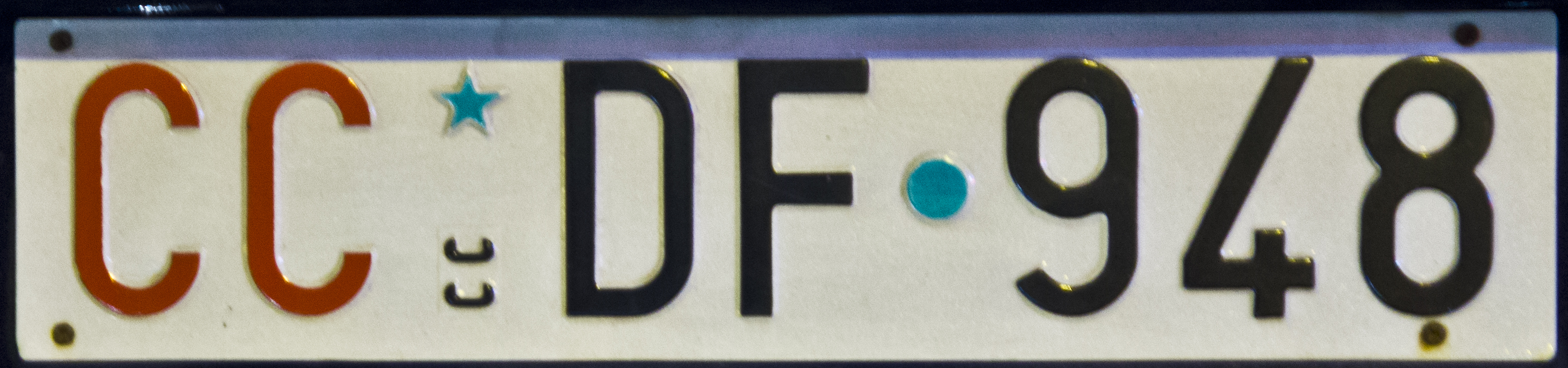
Registration Plate of Carabinieri

These plates have the prefix "CC" (Corpo di Carabinieri) in red. The style is CC LL 000 where "CC" is a prefix, "L" is a letter, and "0" is a digit. Motorcycles use a CC A0000 system.

The plates came into use when the Carabinieri became a separate branch of the Italian Armed Forces in 2000. Before 2000, the Carabinieri used the Army (EI) plates and the first CC plates (which were re-adapted EI plates) had a CC separate piece put over the first part to cover up the "EI" code.

Schematic representation

CC DF 948

Motorcycle plate

CC A
1905

=== Trolleybus plates ===
These plates' format is the two-letter provincial code, followed by the operator's logo and number (normally 3 digits). They use white digits on a blue background, and their size is 320 x 115 mm. Until the 1950s they were circulated along with normal car plates.

=== Test Plates ===
Testing plates have a square (16.5 by 16.5 cm) size and follows the format XX p X/XXXX (where "X" could be a letter or a digit ) arranged in two lines since 2003. These are the only kind of Italian plates whose code could be chosen by the owner.

These plates have a "P" instead of the republic emblem that means Prova (Test).

These plates are usually used from car dealers to test the cars on the public road, for cars that do not have an insurance or do not have a regular number plate available. They can also be transferred to other cars.

Through 1951 to 1976, testing plates used to be square, black background with white digits, in middle the word "PROVA" was written in red, followed by the provincial code, the official emblem and a progressive number.

From 1976 to 1985, these plates used to have black background with white digits on a single line, with the provincial code followed by a progressive number and the word "PROVA" vertically aligned by 90° degrees.

Until 1994, Test plates used to have the provincial code instead of the first two digits, followed by a random combination of letters and numbers. From 1994 to 2003, the plates used to be on a single line with two letters followed by the random digits.

Current Prova plate

X0P 1
AZ3A

1985–1994 Prova plate

ROMA P AR13A

Test series from 1948 to 1976

PROVA
MI
5322

Test series from 1976 to 1985

ROMA PROVA 5033

== Province codes ==
=== Province codes 1927 to present day ===
Code	Province	Code	Province	Code	Province	Code	Province	Code	Province
AG	Agrigento	AL	Alessandria	AN	Ancona	AO	Aosta / Aoste	AP	Ascoli Piceno
AQ	L'Aquila	AR	Arezzo	AT	Asti	AV	Avellino	BA	Bari
BG	Bergamo	BI	Biella	BL	Belluno	BN	Benevento	BO	Bologna
BR	Brindisi	BS	Brescia	BT	Barletta-Andria-Trani	BZ	Bolzano / Bozen	CA	Cagliari
CB	Campobasso	CE	Caserta	CH	Chieti	CL	Caltanissetta	CN	Cuneo
CO	Como	CR	Cremona	CS	Cosenza	CT	Catania	CZ	Catanzaro
EN	Enna	FC	Forlì-Cesena	FE	Ferrara	FG	Foggia	FI	Florence (Firenze)
FM	Fermo	FR	Frosinone	GE	Genoa (Genova)	GO	Gorizia	GR	Grosseto
IM	Imperia	IS	Isernia	KR	Crotone	LC	Lecco	LE	Lecce
LI	Leghorn (Livorno)	LO	Lodi	LT	Latina	LU	Lucca	MB	Monza and Brianza
MC	Macerata	ME	Messina	MI	Milan	MN	Mantua	MO	Modena
MS	Massa-Carrara	MT	Matera	NA	Naples	NO	Novara	NU	Nuoro
OR	Oristano	PA	Palermo	PC	Piacenza	PD	Padua	PE	Pescara
PG	Perugia	PI	Pisa	PN	Pordenone	PO	Prato	PR	Parma
PT	Pistoia	PU	Pesaro and Urbino	PV	Pavia	PZ	Potenza	RA	Ravenna
RC	Reggio Calabria	RE	Reggio Emilia	RG	Ragusa	RI	Rieti	RN	Rimini
RO	Rovigo	Roma	Rome	SA	Salerno	SI	Siena	SO	Sondrio
SP	La Spezia	SR	Syracuse	SS	Sassari	SU	South Sardinia	SV	Savona
TA	Taranto	TE	Teramo	TN	Trent	TO	Turin	TP	Trapani
TR	Terni	TS	Trieste	TV	Treviso	UD	Udine	VA	Varese
VB	Verbania	VC	Vercelli	VE	Venice	VI	Vicenza	VR	Verona
VT	Viterbo	VV	Vibo Valentia						

These abbreviations for the names of provinces are extensively used in contexts other than vehicle registration. For example, "Trino (VC)", to indicate a place called Trino in the province of Vercelli, could appear on letterheaded paper or in a postal address or in a guide book and often on business cards and trade signs. The abbreviations even count as valid words in crosswords and in Scarabeo, the Italian version of the board game Scrabble. Sometimes, the code RM is used instead of Roma for the province of Rome, in postal addresses or documents.

=== Province codes 1905 to 1927 ===
Number	Province	Number	Province	Number	Province	Number	Province
1	Alessandria	2	Ancona	3	L'Aquila	4	Arezzo
5	Ascoli Piceno	6	Avellino	7	Bari	8	Belluno
9	Benevento	10	Bergamo	11	Bologna	12	Brescia
13	Cagliari	14	Caltanissetta	15	Campobasso	16	Caserta
17	Catania	18	Catanzaro	19	Chieti	20	Como
21	Cosenza	22	Cremona	23	Cuneo	24	Ferrara
25	Florence (Firenze)	26	Foggia	27	Forlì	28	Genoa (Genova)
29	Agrigento	30	Grosseto	31	Lecce	32	Leghorn (Livorno)
33	Lucca	34	Macerata	35	Mantua (Mantova)	36	Massa and Carrara
37	Messina	38	Milan (Milano)	39	Modena	40	Naples (Napoli)
41	Novara	42	Padua (Padova)	43	Palermo	44	Parma
45	Pavia	46	Perugia	47	Pesaro	48	Piacenza
49	Pisa	50	Imperia	51	Potenza	52	Ravenna
53	Reggio di Calabria	54	Reggio nell'Emilia	55	Rome (Roma)	56	Rovigo
57	Salerno	58	Sassari	59	Siena	60	Syracuse (Siracusa)
61	Sondrio	62	Teramo	63	Turin (Torino)	64	Trapani
65	Treviso	66	Udine	67	Venice (Venezia)	68	Verona
69	Vicenza	70	Pola	71	La Spezia	72	Taranto
73	Trent (Trento)	74	Trieste	75	Zara	76	Fiume

=== Defunct province codes (post-1927) ===
Code	Province	Reason	Years
AU	Apuania	Province renamed back to Massa-Carrara (MS).	1939–1949
CG	Castrogiovanni	City renamed to Enna.	1927–1928
CI	Carbonia-Iglesias	Province abolished.	2001–2016
CU	Cuneo	Code changed to CN.	1927–1928
FO	Forlì	Province renamed to Forlì-Cesena (FC).	1927–1994
FU	Fiume	Code changed to FM.	1927–1930
FM	Fiume	City no longer in Italy, present day Rijeka, Croatia	1930–1945
GI	Girgenti	City renamed to Agrigento.	1927–1928
LB	Lubiana	City no longer in Italy, present day Ljubljana, Slovenia	1941–1945
OG	Ogliastra	Province abolished.	2001–2016
OT	Olbia-Tempio	Province abolished.	2001–2016
PL	Pola	City no longer in Italy, present day Pula, Croatia	1927–1945
PU	Perugia	Code changed to PG.	1927–1933
PS	Pesaro	Province renamed to Pesaro and Urbino (PU).	1927–1994
VS	Medio Campidano	Province abolished.	2001–2016
ZA	Zara	City no longer in Italy, present day Zadar, Croatia	1927–1945

== Diplomatic codes ==
Greyed out codes are not currently used. Q and V cannot be used in consular corps plates, as such they are Bold Italic.

Code	Country	Code	Country	Code	Country	Code	Country	Code	Country
AA	Albania	AC	Austria	AE	Belgium	AG	Bulgaria	AK	Czech Republic
AM	Cyprus	AN	Denmark	AP	Finland	AQ	France	AU	Germany
AV	West Germany	BA	East Germany	BC	United Kingdom	BF	Slovenia	BG	Greece
BM	Ireland	BN	Italy (Holy See)	BP	Serbia	BQ	Croatia	BR	Luxembourg
BS	Malta	BT	Monaco	BV	Norway	BX	Netherlands	CA	Poland
CC	Portugal	CE	Romania	CG	San Marino	CH	Spain	CM	Switzerland
CN	Sweden	CQ	Switzerland	CR	Turkey	CX	Hungary	DA	Russia (formerly Soviet Union)
DC	Ukraine	DD	Uzbekistan	DE	Vatican City (Apostolic Nunciature)	DF	Slovenia	DG	North Macedonia
DH	Bosnia and Herzegovina	DL	Slovakia	DM	Armenia	DN	Georgia	DP	Kazakhstan
DQ	Latvia	DR	Belarus	DS	Lithuania	DT	Moldova	DV	Iceland
DZ	Azerbaijan	EA	Burkina Faso	EB	Dominica	EC	Uganda	ED	Burundi
EF	Rwanda	EG	Zimbabwe	EH	Qatar	EL	Chad	EM	Mauritania
EN	Eritrea	EP	Mali	ER	Belize	ES	Equatorial Guinea (c/o FAO)	ET	Kosovo
GA	Afghanistan	GB	Saudi Arabia	GC	Bangladesh	GD	Myanmar	GE	Taiwan
GF	China	GK	Philippines	GL	North Korea	GM	South Korea	GP	United Arab Emirates
GQ	Philippines	GS	Japan	GZ	Jordan	HA	India	HC	Indonesia
HE	Iran	HF	Iraq	HL	Israel	HP	Iraq	HQ	Kuwait
HR	Lebanon	HS	Malaysia	HT	Oman	HV	Pakistan	HX	Syria
LA	Sri Lanka	LB	Thailand	LE	Vietnam	LF	Yemen	LH	Montenegro
LM	Timor-Leste	NA	Algeria	NC	Angola	ND	Cameroon	NF	Cape Verde
NG	Central African Republic	NH	Republic of the Congo	NL	Ivory Coast	NM	Egypt	NR	Ethiopia
NT	Gabon	NX	Ghana	PA	Guinea	PB	Kenya	PC	Lesotho
PD	Liberia	PE	Libya	PL	Madagascar	PN	Morocco	PQ	Nigeria
PS	Senegal	PT	Sierra Leone	PV	Mozambique	PX	Somalia	QA	South Africa
QC	Sudan	QE	Tanzania	QG	Tunisia	QL	Democratic Republic of the Congo	QN	Zambia
QP	Niger	SA	Canada	SD	Mexico	SF SH SL SN SQ	United States	TA	Costa Rica
TC	Cuba	TE	Dominican Republic	TF	Ecuador	TG	Jamaica	TH	Guatemala
TL	Haiti	TM	Honduras	TP	Nicaragua	TQ	Panama	TS	El Salvador
UA	Argentina	UE	Bolivia	UF	Brazil	UH	Chile	UL	Colombia
UN	Paraguay	UP	Peru	US	Uruguay	UT	Venezuela	VA	Argentina
VF	Brazil	VL	Colombia	VS	Uruguay	XA	Sovereign Military Order of Malta and Palestine	XC XD XE XF XH	FAO, United Nations, International organizations, and European Union
XG	Vatican City	ZA	Australia	ZC	New Zealand				
