= D70 =

D70 may refer to:

- HMAS Warrego (D70), a 1911 Royal Australian Navy River class destroyer
- HMS Solebay (D70), a 1944 British Royal Navy Battle-class destroyer
- HMS Ravager (D70), a 1942 British Royal Navy Attacker-class escort carrier
- Nikon D70, a 2004 digital single-lens reflex camera model
- D70 road (Croatia), a state road
- Agranulocytosis, an acute condition involving a severe leukopenia (ICD-10 code: D70)
- Neo-Grünfeld Defence, Encyclopaedia of Chess Openings code
- Pueblo County School District 70

== See also ==
- 70D (disambiguation)
- 70 (disambiguation)
