= H70 =

H70 may refer to:

== Vehicles ==
- HMS Fortune (H70) also known as HMCS Saskatchewan (H70), a WWII British and Canadian destroyer
- Bell H-70 Arapaho, a U.S. light military helicopter
- Toyota HiAce H-70, a model of light commercial vehicle
- Hylas Yachts H70 sailing yacht

== Places ==
- Shin-Hakodate-Hokuto Station (station code H70), Hokuto, Hokkaido, Japan
- Stratford Field (FAA airport code H70), Stratford, Texas, USA; see List of airports in Texas
- Asheville Observatory (observatory code H70), Asheville, North Carolina, USA; see List of observatory codes

== Other uses ==
- IBM Multiprise series H70, a mainframe computer
- Hydrogen station fueling standard H70 at 700 bar pressure compressed hydrogen

== See also ==
- 70 (disambiguation)
- H (disambiguation)
