= 70th Division =

In military terms, 70th Division or 70th Infantry Division may refer to:

== Infantry divisions ==
- 70th Mechanized Infantry Division, People's Republic of China, previously the 70th Army Division
- 70th Infantry Division (Wehrmacht), Germany
- 70th Division (Imperial Japanese Army)
- 70th Infantry Division (Russian Empire)
- 70th Motor Rifle Division, Russia
- 70th Rifle Division, Soviet Union
- 70th Guards Rifle Division, Soviet Union, later 70th Guards Motor Rifle Division
- 70th Division (Spain)
- 70th Division (Syria)
- 70th Infantry Division (United Kingdom), Second World War
- 70th Infantry Division (United States)

== Other divisions ==
- 70th Anti-Aircraft Artillery Division, Soviet Union

== See also ==
- List of military divisions by number
- 70th Brigade (disambiguation)
- 70th Regiment (disambiguation)
- 70th Squadron (disambiguation)
