= 70th Illinois Infantry Regiment =

70th Regiment Illinois Volunteer Infantry
- Illinois state flag
- Active: July 4, 1862, to October 23, 1862
- Country: United States
- Allegiance: Union
- Branch: Infantry
- Engagements: None

The 70th Regiment, Illinois Volunteer Infantry, was an infantry regiment that served in the Union Army during the American Civil War.

== Service ==
The 70th Regiment was organized at Camp Butler, Illinois and mustered into Federal service on July 4, 1862, for a term of three months. The regiment was assigned to Camp Butler, where it guarded prisoners, and mustered out on October 23, 1862.

== Total strength and casualties ==
The 70th Regiment suffered 19 enlisted men who died of disease, for a total of 19 fatalities.

== Commanders ==
- Colonel Owen T. Reeves - mustered out with the regiment.

== See also ==
- List of Illinois Civil War Units
- Illinois in the American Civil War
