= 70th Regiment of Foot (disambiguation) =

Two regiments of the British Army have been numbered the 70th Regiment of Foot:

- 70th Regiment of Foot (1745), or Ancaster's Regiment, raised in 1745 and disbanded in 1746
- 70th (Surrey) Regiment of Foot, raised in 1756 and renumbered 1758.
