= Fiat Zero =

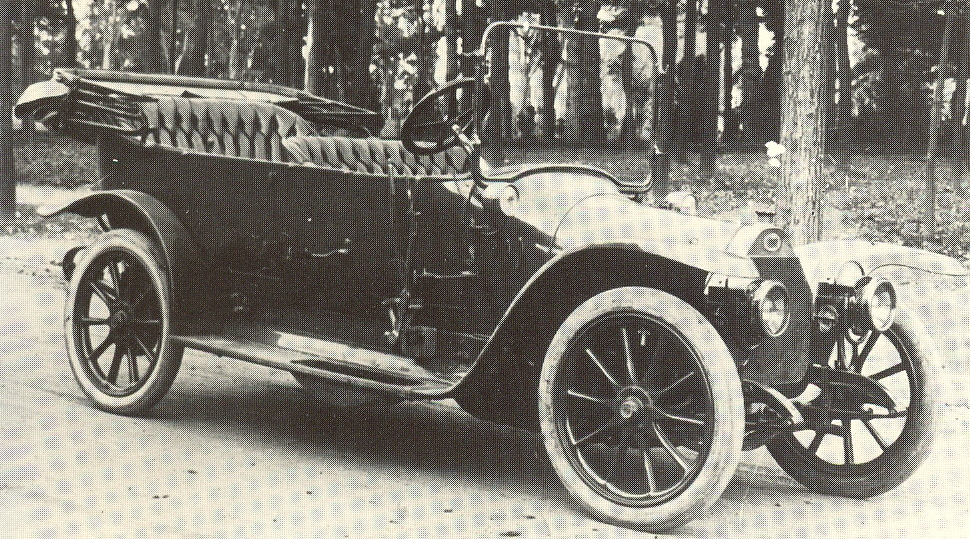
- Fiat Tipo Zero Torpedo 1912

Overview
- Manufacturer: Fiat
- Also called: Fiat 12/15 hp
- Production: 1912–1915
- Assembly: Turin, Italy

Body and chassis
- Class: Small family car (C)
- Body style: Torpedo
- Layout: FR layout

Powertrain
- Engine: 1847 cc (1.8 l) I4; 18 bhp (13 kW)

Dimensions
- Length: 3,660 mm (144.1 in)
- Width: 1,450 mm (57.1 in)
- Curb weight: 900 kg (1,984 lb) – 1,200 kg (2,646 lb)

Chronology
- Successor: Fiat 70

The Fiat Zero, known also as the Fiat 12/15 hp, (Note: The letters 'hp' defined its fiscal horsepower rather than its bhp.) was a car produced by Fiat from 1912 to 1915. At launch it sold for 8,000 lire, which later was reduced to 6,900 lire. It was equipped with a 1,800 cc (1.8 L), 18 PS (13.2 kW) engine that achieved about 19.6 mpg_{‑US} (8.3 km/l) and could reach about 50 mph (80 km/h). It was the first Fiat to sell more than 2,000 similarly bodied units, most being four-seater bodies. Production ended in 1915 when the factory was converted for war production.

There was also a light bodied version produced which claimed various speed records.
