= Fiat 70 =

Fiat Tipo 70
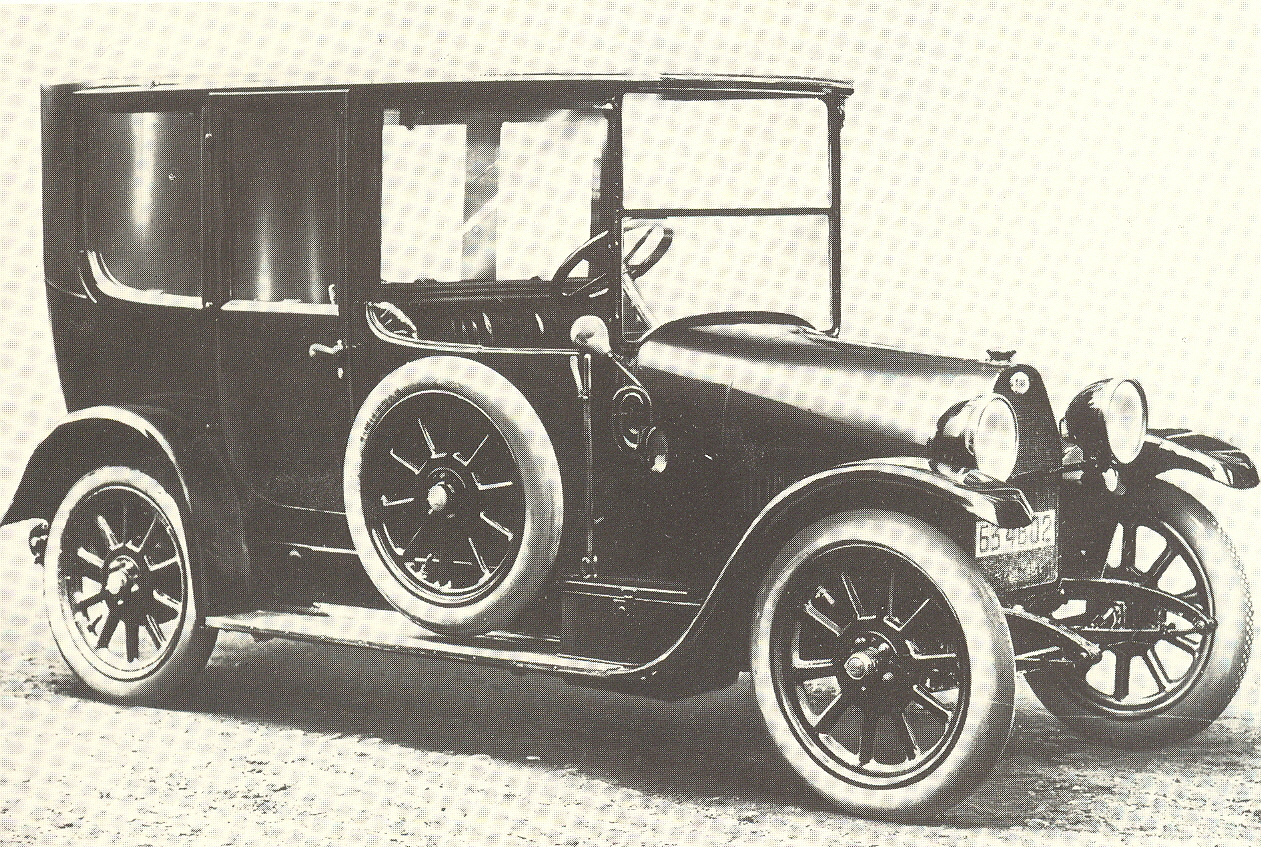

Overview
- Manufacturer: Fiat
- Production: 1915–1920

Body and chassis
- Body style: Sedan
- Layout: FR layout

Powertrain
- Engine: straight-4 2001 cc
- Transmission: 4-speed manual

Dimensions
- Wheelbase: 2,706 mm (107 in)
- Length: 3,820 mm (150 in)
- Curb weight: 1,735 kg (3,825 lb)

Chronology
- Predecessor: Fiat Zero
- Successor: Fiat 501

The Fiat 70 was a car produced by Italian car manufacturer Fiat between 1915 and 1920. The 70 used a 2-liter straight-four engine producing 21 hp and capable of a top speed of 70 km/h (43 mph). Around a thousand of this model were produced, with almost all going to the Italian army. The car was quite advanced for its time, featuring a complete electrical system.

The 70 was replaced by the Fiat 501.
