= Fiat 501 =

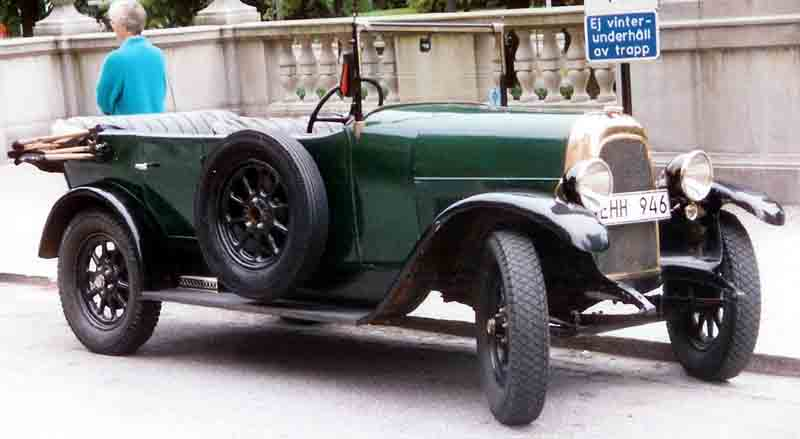

Overview
- Manufacturer: Fiat
- Production: 1919–1926

Body and chassis
- Class: Small family car (C)
- Body style: 4-door sedan 2/4-door cabriolet
- Layout: FR layout
- Related: Fiat 502

Powertrain
- Engine: 1460 cc I4
- Transmission: 4-speed manual

Dimensions
- Wheelbase: 265 cm (104.3 in)
- Curb weight: 900 kg (1,984 lb)-1,000 kg (2,205 lb)

Chronology
- Predecessor: Fiat 70
- Successor: Fiat 503

The Fiat 501 is a car produced by Fiat between 1919 and 1926. The 501 was Fiat's first model after World War I. Fiat introduced the S and SS sports versions of the 501 in 1921. Fiat produced 69,618 501s in total.

== Engines ==
| Model | Years | Engine | Displacement | Power | Fuel system |
|---|---|---|---|---|---|
| 501 | 1919-26 | sidevalve, straight-four | 1460 cc | 23 hp (17 kW) | single carburetor |
| 501 S | 1921-26 | sidevalve, straight-four | 1460 cc | 27 hp (20 kW) | single carburetor |
| 501 SS | 1921-26 | sidevalve, straight-four | 1460 cc | 30 hp (22 kW) | single carburetor |
