= 70th Street =

70th Street may refer to:

- 70th Street (Manhattan), an east–west street in Manhattan, New York City
- 70th Street (San Diego Trolley station), a San Diego Trolley station served by the Green Line in La Mesa, California
