= 70th Anti-Aircraft Artillery Division =

- Active: October 1943–c. 1950s
- Country: Soviet Union
- Branch: Red Army (later Soviet Army)
- Type: Anti-Aircraft Artillery

The 70th Anti-Aircraft Artillery Division (Russian: 70-я зенитная артиллерийская дивизия) was an anti-aircraft artillery division of the Soviet Union's Red Army (later the Soviet Army) during World War II and the early postwar period.

Formed in the Volga Military District in late 1943, the division was moved forward to the Kiev Military District in March 1944. It did not see combat and was disbanded by the end of the 1950s.

== World War II ==
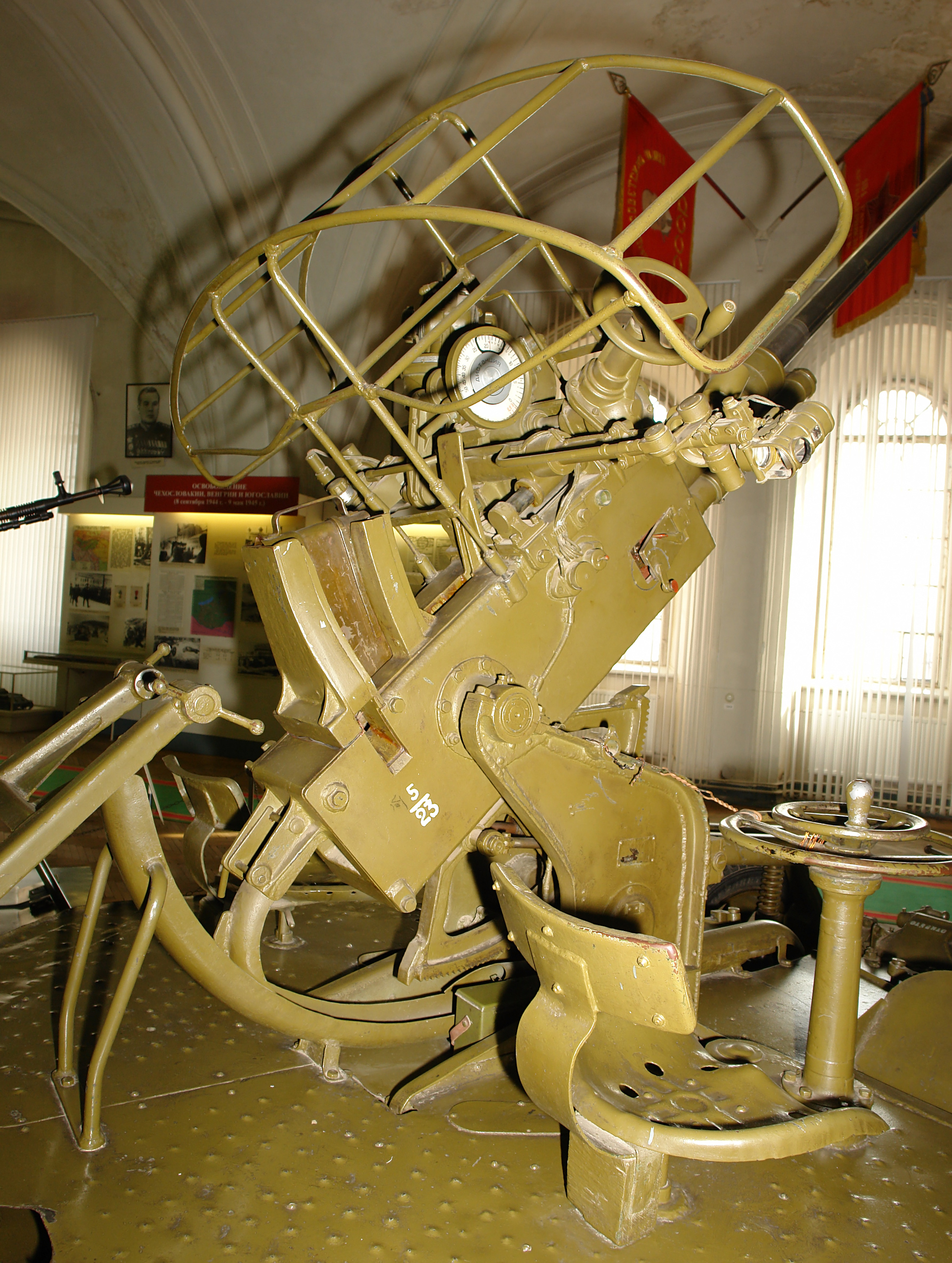
A 37 mm AA gun of the type used by the division during World War II

The division began forming around 3 October 1943, when Colonel Ivan Kurenkov was appointed commander. It was part of the Volga Military District, and included the 1997th, 2001st, 2005th, and 2009th Anti-Aircraft Artillery Regiments. In May 1944, the division was relocated to Zhitomir in the Kiev Military District. From 2 September, Colonel Konstantin Popov served as division commander, leading it for the rest of the war. The division remained at Zhitomir for the rest of the war.

== Postwar ==
In late 1945, the division relocated to Transcaucasia. The 2005th Regiment, the first echelon of the division, arrived at Kutaisi in late November. Popov commanded it until March 1948, when he was transferred to command a brigade. The division was among those anti-aircraft artillery divisions disbanded without being converted into another unit by the end of the 1950s.
