= Fiat 503 =

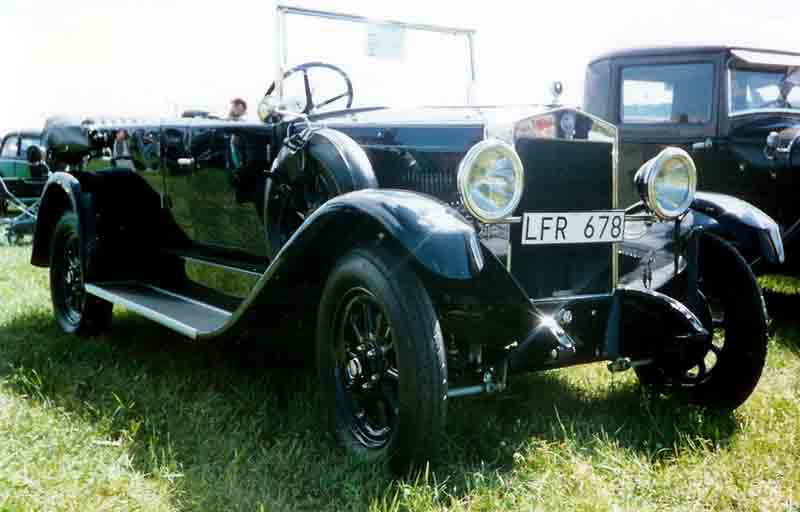
- Fiat 503 Torpedo 1927

Overview
- Manufacturer: Fiat
- Production: 1926–1927

Body and chassis
- Class: Small family car (C)
- Body style: 4-door sedan 4-door cabriolet
- Layout: FR layout

Powertrain
- Engine: 1460 cc I4
- Transmission: 4-speed manual

Dimensions
- Wheelbase: 275 cm (108.3 in)
- Curb weight: 1,100 kg (2,425 lb)

Chronology
- Predecessor: Fiat 501
- Successor: Fiat 514

The Fiat 503 is a car produced by Fiat between 1926 and 1927. The 503 was based on the Fiat 501, with modified suspension and brakes. It used the 501's 1.5-liter engine, producing 27 PS (20 kW). The company produced 42,000 examples of the 503.
