= 70 =

70 may refer to:

- 70 (number), the natural number following 69 and preceding 71
- One of the years 70 BC, AD 70, 1970, 2070
- Seventy (Latter Day Saints), an office in the Melchizedek priesthood of several denominations within the Latter Day Saint movement
  - Seventy (LDS Church), in The Church of Jesus Christ of Latter-day Saints
- 70 Panopaea, a main-belt asteroid
- Tatra 70, a full-size luxury car
- Fiat 70, a sedan

== See also ==
- 70th (disambiguation)
