= 70th Brigade =

70th Brigade may refer to:

== China ==
- 70th Motorized Infantry Brigade (People's Republic of China)

== Russia ==
- 70th Guards Motor Rifle Brigade (Russia)

== Soviet Union ==
- 70th Separate Guards Motor Rifle Brigade

== Spain ==
- 70th Mixed Brigade

== Turkey ==
- 70th Mechanized Infantry Brigade

== Ukraine ==
- 70th Support Brigade (Ukraine)

== United Kingdom ==
- 70th Infantry Brigade (United Kingdom)
- 70th (3rd West Lancashire) Anti-Aircraft Brigade, Royal Artillery

== See also ==
- 70th Division (disambiguation)
- 70th Regiment (disambiguation)
