= Grueso =

Grueso is a surname. Notable people with the surname include:

- Antonio Latorre Grueso, Spanish footballer
- Daniel Grueso (born 1985), Colombian sprinter
- Gustavo Adolfo Torres Grueso (born 1996), Colombian footballer
- Libia Grueso, Colombian social worker and civil rights activist
- Roberto Carlos Peña Grueso (born 1984), Colombian footballer

== See also ==
- Gruezo:
  - Carlos Gruezo (footballer, born 1975), Ecuadorian footballer
  - Carlos Gruezo (footballer, born 1995), Ecuadorian footballer
