= Claire Nouvian =

French environmental activist and journalist

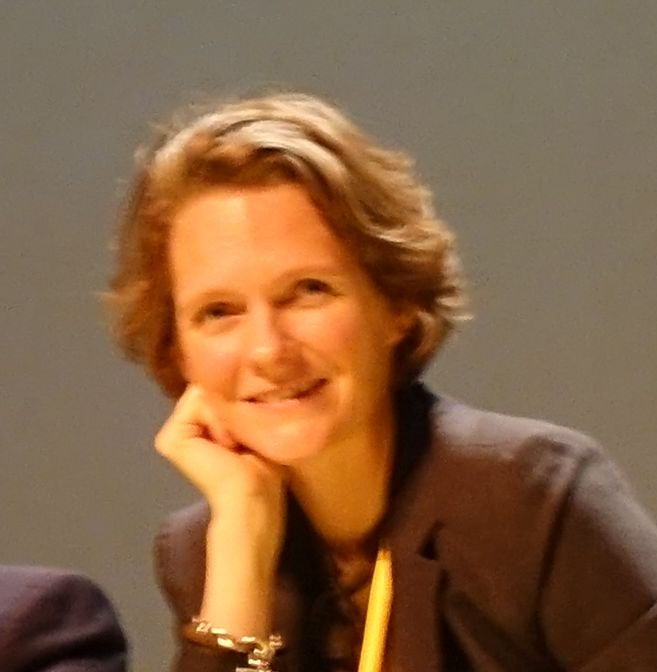
- Claire Nouvian in 2018
- Born: 19 March 1974 (age 51); Bordeaux, France
- Occupations: Journalist, television producer film director and organizational leader
- Awards: French National Order of Merit (2013); Goldman Environment Prize (2018)

Claire Nouvian (born 19 March 1974) is a French environmental activist, journalist, television producer, film director and organizational leader.

Claire Nouvian is born in Bordeaux. After a career in journalism, she engaged in advocacy for protection of the ocean and marine life. She was awarded the Trophée des femmes en or in 2012. She received the Goldman Environment Prize in 2018, the second French person to receive this prize (after biologist Christine Jean in 1992).
