= Rodolfo Montiel Flores =

Mexican environmentalist

- Occupation: Campesino
- Awards: Goldman Environmental Prize (2000)

Rodolfo Montiel Flores is a Mexican campesino, a subsistence farmer, from the village El Mameyal in the state of Guerrero, Mexico.

He was awarded the Goldman Environmental Prize in 2000 for organizing campesinos to protest against rampant logging in their district.
