= Helen Slottje =

Environmental activist

Helen Slottje is an American lawyer and environmental activist. She received the Goldman Environmental Prize in 2014.

== Life ==
Helen Holden Slottje is an American lawyer known for developing the legal strategy that allowed New York municipalities to prohibit hydraulic fracturing through local zoning authority. A former commercial real estate attorney at a Boston law firm, she moved to Ithaca, New York, and in November 2009 co-founded the Community Environmental Defense Council with her husband and legal partner, David Slottje.. She began fighting fracking after attending a presentation on the topic in 2009. Working pro bono, the Slottjes argued that the home rule provision of the New York State Constitution empowered towns to bar heavy industrial uses, including gas drilling, through land use law. The approach was adopted by more than 170 New York municipalities. It was tested in litigation against the Town of Dryden and, on June 30, 2014, upheld by the New York Court of Appeals in Wallach v. Town of Dryden, which held that the state's Oil, Gas and Solution Mining Law did not preempt local zoning. New York finalized a statewide ban on high-volume fracking the following year. In 2014, Slottje was the Goldman Environmental Prize laureate for North America.

Helen lives in Ithaca, New York with her husband. She previously worked as a commercial attorney in Boston.
