= Heffa Schücking =

German environmentalist

- Known for: Grassroots environmentalism
- Awards: Goldman Environmental Prize (1994)

Heffa Schücking (born 1959) is a German environmentalist. She was awarded the Goldman Environmental Prize in 1994, for her works to protect the rainforests.

Today, she mainly works for the NGO urgewald on campaigns to prevent banks and the financial industry from making harmful investments such as cluster ammunition, coal mining or the nuclear industry.
