= Chibeze Ezekiel =

Ghanaian environmental activist

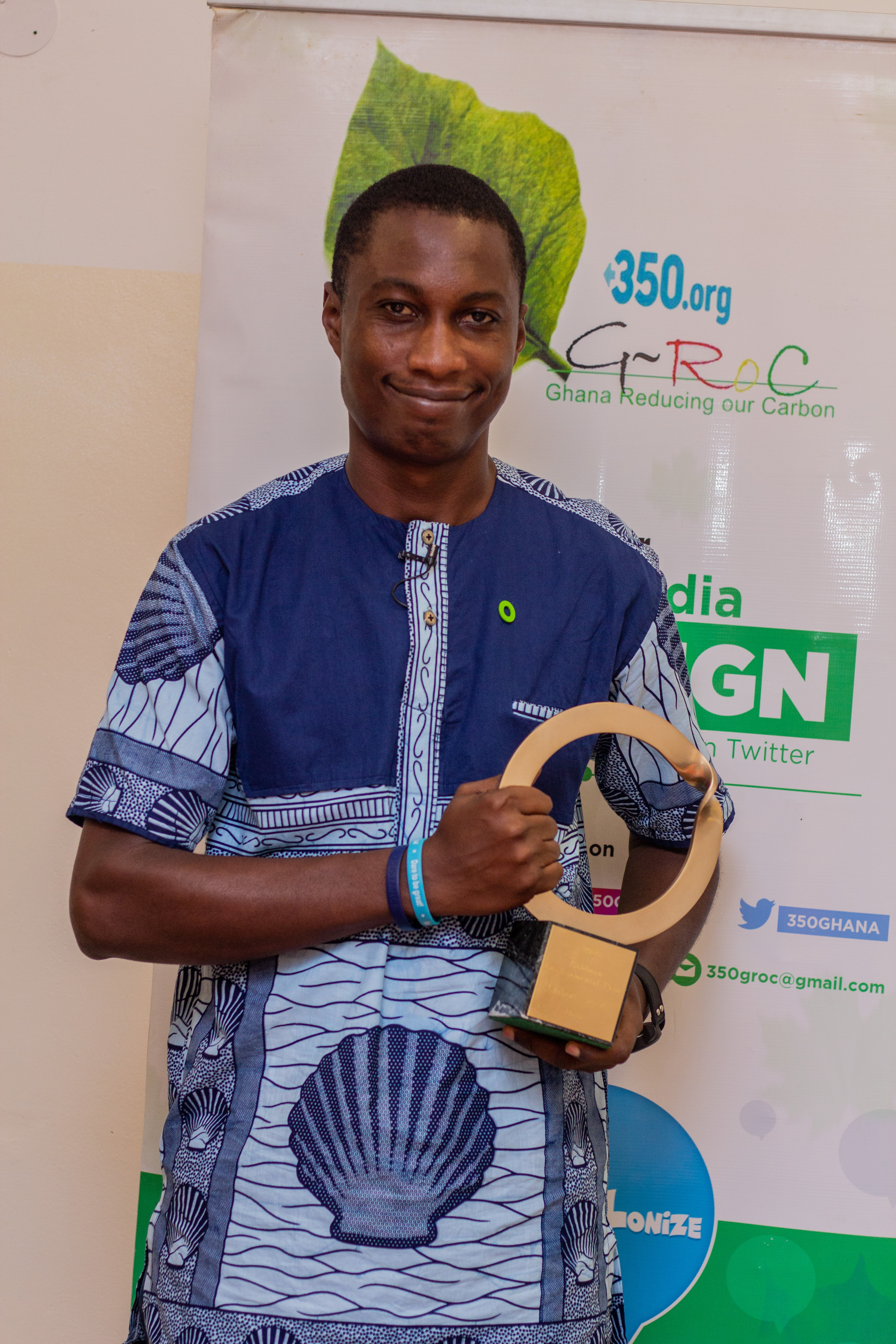
- Occupation: Environmental activist
- Notable work: He is the founder of Strategic Youth Network for Development.
- Awards: Goldman Prize 2020

Chibeze Ezekiel (born 1979 or 1980) is a Ghanaian environmental activist and a 2020 Goldman Environmental Prize award recipient for Africa. He is known to have challenged the Ghanaian Ministry of Environment to cancel the construction of a coal plant through activism.

== Life and career ==
He is the founder of Strategic Youth Network for Development, a youth-centered organization for environmental and social change in Ghana. He was also the National Coordinator of 350 Ghana Reducing Our Carbon (350 GROC) and he is the chairman of Youth in Natural Resource and Environmental Governance (Youth-NREG). He serves as Panel Member of International Experts on the Environment of Peace 2022 (EP 2022) project.

== Activism ==
The government of Ghana in 2013 proposed the construction of a 700 MW coal power plant and an adjoining port in Aboabo in Ekumfi district. The project was proposed by the Volta River Authority and Shenzhen Energy Group: The project required a $1.5 Billion loan from China African Development Fund and it was going to be the first of a kind in Ghana which has no coal reserves, hence there would be importation of raw material annually from South Africa estimated to be about 2 million tons.

Chibeze led grassroots campaign against the construction of a coal-fired power station in Ghana. He worked with the local communities educating them on the effect and damage the coal-fired power station would result to. He further requested that the government switch to renewable energy.

In 2022, he was a possible contender according to experts as an environmental activist for Nobel Peace Prize.

== Awards ==
He started as a certified youth trainer on climate change in 2009, and 10 years pass after all his works became a Winner of the Goldman Prize 2020
