= Jorge Varela (environmentalist) =

Honduran environmentalist

- Known for: Grassroots environmentalism
- Awards: Goldman Environmental Prize (1999)

Jorge Varela is an environmentalist from Honduras. He received the Goldman Environmental Prize in 1999, for his contribution to marine conservation in the Gulf of Fonseca.
