= Goldman Environmental Prize =

Award for environmental activists

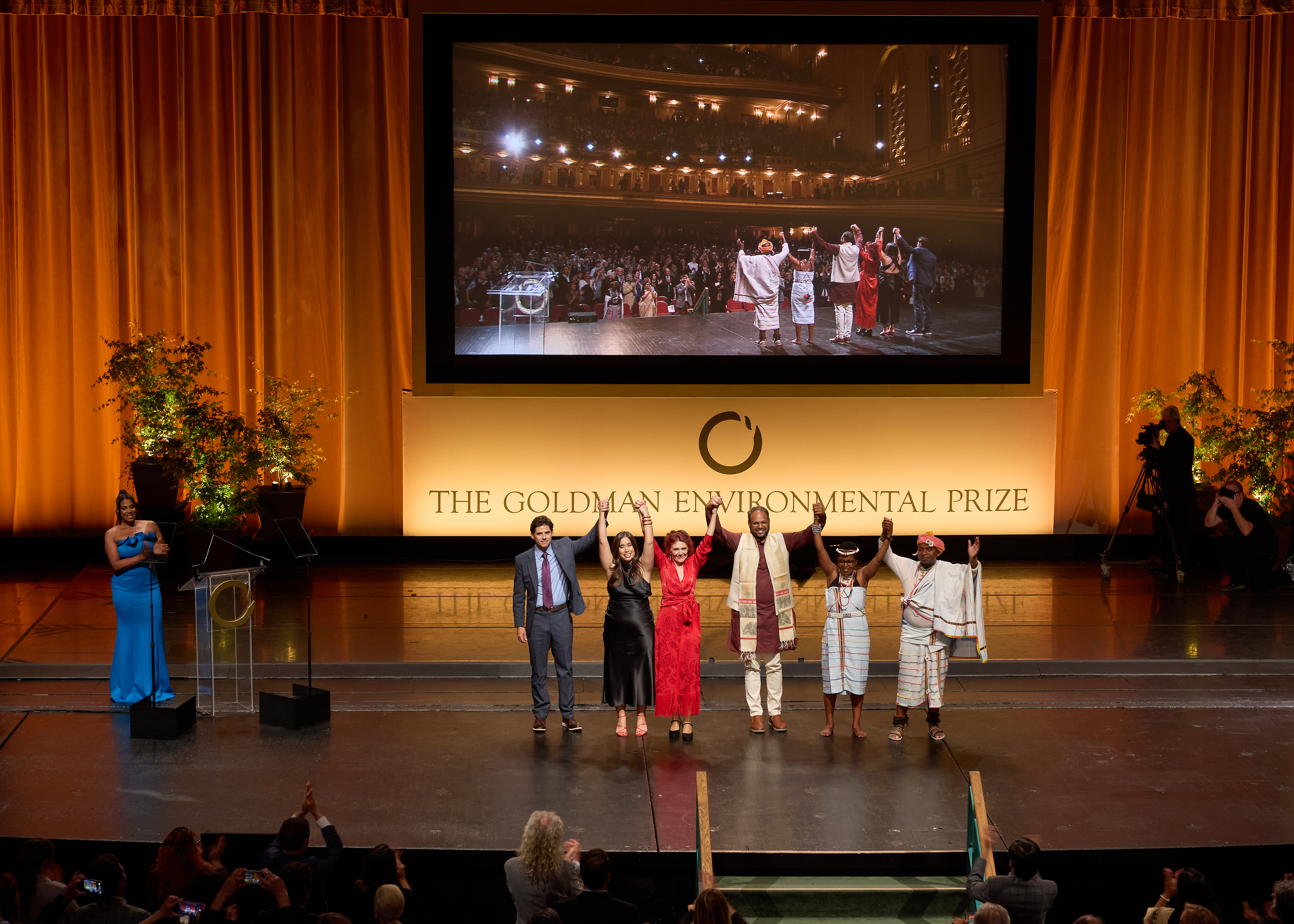
- The winners of the 2024 Goldman Environmental Prize at the San Francisco War Memorial Opera House
- Website: goldmanprize.org

The Goldman Environmental Prize is a prize awarded annually to grassroots environmental activists.

== History ==
Awardees are named from each of the world's six geographic regions: Africa, Asia, Europe, Islands and Island Nations, North America, and South and Central America. The award is given by the Goldman Environmental Foundation headquartered in San Francisco, California. The Prize is often referred to as the Green Nobel.

The Goldman Environmental Prize was created in 1989 by philanthropists Richard and Rhoda Goldman.

The winners are selected by an international jury who receive confidential nominations from a worldwide network of environmental organizations and individuals. Prize winners participate in a 10-day tour of San Francisco and Washington, D.C., for an awards ceremony and presentation, news conferences, media briefings and meetings with political, public policy, financial and environmental leaders. The award ceremony features short documentary videos on each winner, narrated by Robert Redford through the year 2020, and Sigourney Weaver beginning in 2021.

The 2019 Goldman Environmental Prize ceremony marking the 30th anniversary took place on April 29, 2019, at the War Memorial Opera House in San Francisco. A second award ceremony took place on May 1, 2019, in Washington, D.C.

The 2020, 2021, and 2022 Goldman Environmental Prize ceremonies took place online due to the COVID-19 pandemic, with pre-recorded videos premiering on November 30, 2020, June 15, 2021, and May 25, 2022, respectively.

Live ceremonies resumed in 2023, taking place in San Francisco on April 24 and in Washington, D.C., on April 26.

== Prize winners ==
=== 1990 ===
- Robert Brown (Australia)
- Lois Gibbs (United States)
- Janet Gibson (Belize)
- Harrison Ngau Laing (Malaysia)
- János Vargha (Hungary)
- Michael Werikhe (Kenya)

=== 1991 ===
- Wangari Muta Maathai (Kenya)
- Barnens Regnskog (Eha Kern and Roland Tiensuu) (Sweden)
- Evaristo Nugkuag (Peru)
- Yoichi Kuroda (Japan)
- Samuel LaBudde (United States)
- Cath Wallace (New Zealand)

=== 1992 ===
- Jeton Anjain (Marshall Islands)
- Medha Patkar (India)
- Wadja Egnankou (Ivory Coast)
- Christine Jean (France)
- Colleen McCrory (Canada)
- Carlos Alberto Ricardo (Brazil)

=== 1993 ===
- Margaret Jacobsohn and Garth Owen-Smith (Namibia)
- Juan Mayr (Colombia)
- Dai Qing (China)
- John Sinclair (Australia)
- JoAnn Tall (United States)
- Sviatoslav Zabelin (Russia)

=== 1994 ===
- Matthew Coon Come (Canada)
- Tuenjai Deetes (Thailand)
- Laila Iskander Kamel (Egypt)
- Luis Macas (Ecuador)
- Heffa Schücking (Germany)
- Andrew Simmons (St. Vincent and the Grenadines)

=== 1995 ===
- Aurora Castillo (United States)
- Yul Choi (South Korea)
- Noah Idechong (Palau)
- Emma Must (England)
- Ricardo Navarro (El Salvador)
- Ken Saro-Wiwa (Nigeria)

=== 1996 ===
- Ndyakira Amooti (Uganda)
- Bill Ballantine (New Zealand)
- Edwin Bustillos (Mexico)
- M.C. Mehta (India)
- Marina Silva (Brasil)
- Albena Simeonova (Bulgaria)

=== 1997 ===
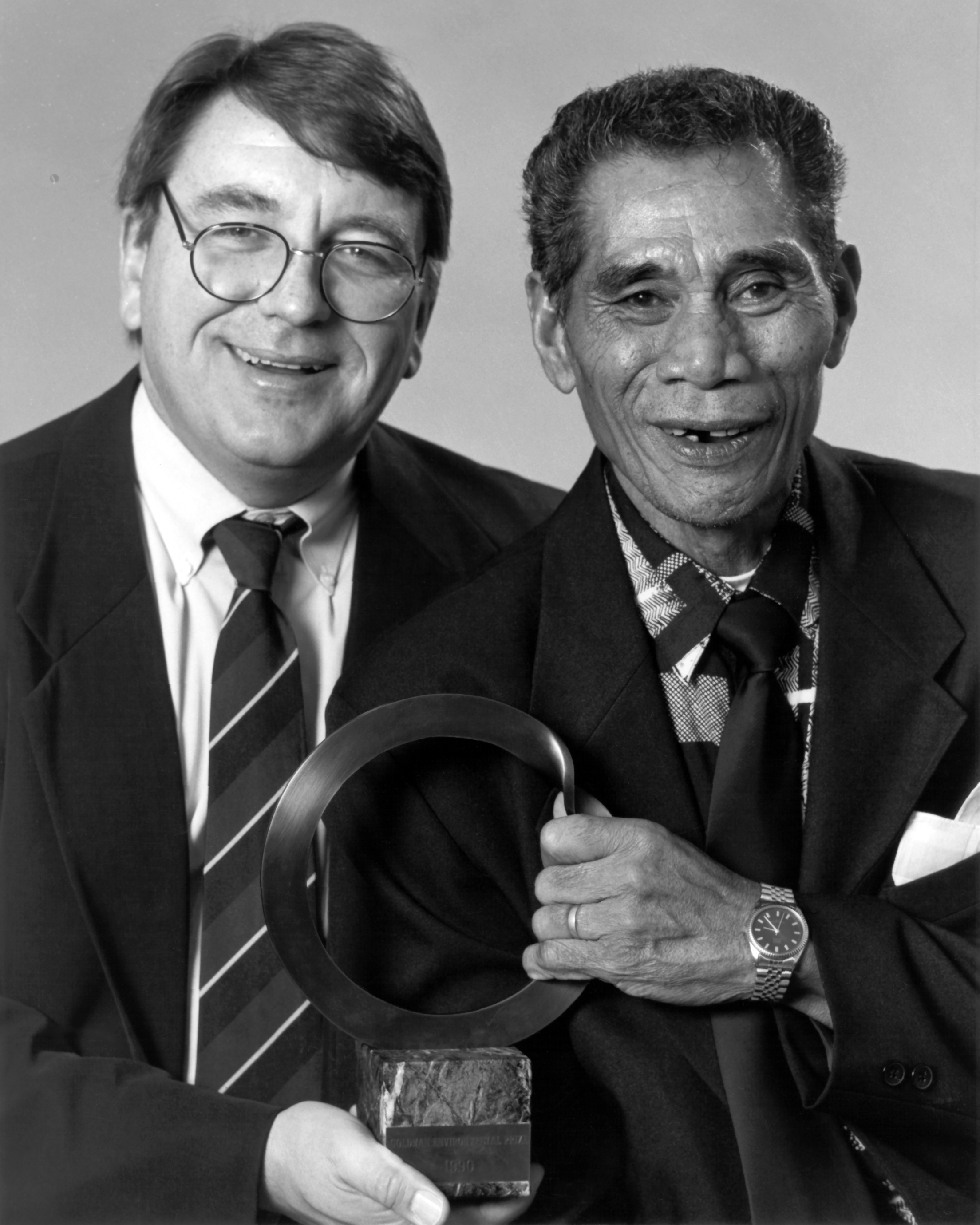
Ethnobiologist Paul Alan Cox (left) and village chief Fuiono Senio (right) won the Goldman Environmental Prize in 1997 for their conservation efforts at Falealupo in Western Samoa. Their work later led to the founding of Seacology.

- Nick Carter (Zambia)
- Loir Botor Dingit (Indonesia)
- Alexander Nikitin (Russia)
- Juan Pablo Orrego (Chile)
- Fuiono Senio and Paul Alan Cox (Western Samoa)
- Terri Swearingen (United States)

=== 1998 ===
- Anna Giordano (Italy)
- Kory Johnson (United States)
- Berito Kuwaru'wa (Colombia)
- Atherton Martin (Commonwealth of Dominica)
- Sven "Bobby" Peek (South Africa)
- Hirofumi Yamashita (Japan)

=== 1999 ===
- Jacqui Katona and Yvonne Margarula (Australia)
- Michal Kravcik (Slovakia)
- Bernard Martin (Canada)
- Samuel Nguiffo (Cameroon)
- Jorge Varela (Honduras)
- Ka Hsaw Wa (Myanmar)

=== 2000 ===
- Oral Ataniyazova (Uzbekistan)
- Elias Diaz Peña and Oscar Rivas (Paraguay)
- Vera Mischenko (Russia)
- Rodolfo Montiel Flores (Mexico)
- Alexander Peal (Liberia)
- Nat Quansah (Madagascar)

=== 2001 ===
- Jane Akre and Steve Wilson (reporter) (United States)
- Yosepha Alomang (Indonesia)
- Giorgos Catsadorakis and Myrsini Malakou (Greece)
- Oscar Olivera (Bolivia)
- Eugène Rutagarama (Rwanda)
- Bruno Van Peteghem (New Caledonia)

=== 2002 ===
- Pisit Charnsnoh (Thailand)
- Sarah James and Jonathon Solomon (United States)
- Fatima Jibrell (Somalia)
- Alexis Massol González (Puerto Rico)
- Norma Kassi (Canada)
- Jean La Rose (Guyana)
- Jadwiga Łopata (Poland)

=== 2003 ===
- Julia Bonds (United States)
- Pedro Arrojo-Agudo (Spain)
- Eileen Kampakuta Brown and Eileen Wani Wingfield (Australia)
- Von Hernandez (Philippines)
- Maria Elena Foronda Farro (Peru)
- Odigha Odigha (Nigeria)

=== 2004 ===
- Rudolf Amenga-Etego (Ghana)
- Rashida Bee and Champa Devi Shukla (India)
- Libia Grueso (Colombia)
- Manana Kochladze (Georgia)
- Demetrio do Amaral de Carvalho (East Timor)
- Margie Richard (United States)

=== 2005 ===
- Isidro Baldenegro López (Mexico)
- Kaisha Atakhanova (Kazakhstan)
- Jean-Baptiste Chavannes (Haiti)
- Stephanie Danielle Roth (Romania)
- Corneille Ewango (Congo)
- José Andrés Tamayo Cortez (Honduras)

=== 2006 ===
- Silas Kpanan’ Siakor (Liberia)
- Yu Xiaogang (China)
- Olya Melen (Ukraine)
- Anne Kajir (Papua New Guinea)
- Craig E. Williams (United States)
- Tarcisio Feitosa da Silva (Brazil)

=== 2007 ===
- Sophia Rabliauskas (Manitoba, Canada)
- Hammerskjoeld Simwinga (Zambia)
- Tsetsgeegiin Mönkhbayar (Mongolia)
- Julio Cusurichi Palacios (Peru)
- Willie Corduff (Ireland)
- Orri Vigfússon (Iceland)

=== 2008 ===
- Pablo Fajardo and Luis Yanza (Ecuador)
- Jesus Leon Santos (Oaxaca, Mexico)
- Rosa Hilda Ramos (Puerto Rico)
- Feliciano dos Santos (Mozambique)
- Marina Rikhvanova (Russia)
- Ignace Schops from "Hoge Kempen National Park" (Belgium)

=== 2009 ===
- Maria Gunnoe, Bob White, West Virginia (United States)
- Marc Ona, Libreville (Gabon)
- Rizwana Hasan, Dhaka (Bangladesh)
- Olga Speranskaya, Moscow (Russia)
- Yuyun Ismawati (Bali, Indonesia)
- Wanze Eduards and Hugo Jabini (Pikin Slee village and Paramaribo, Suriname)

=== 2010 ===
- Thuli Brilliance Makama (Swaziland)
- Tuy Sereivathana (Cambodia)
- Małgorzata Górska (Poland)
- Humberto Ríos Labrada (Cuba)
- Lynn Henning (United States)
- Randall Arauz (Costa Rica)

=== 2011 ===
- Raoul du Toit, (Zimbabwe)
- Dmitry Lisitsyn (Russia)
- Ursula Sladek (Germany)
- Prigi Arisandi (Indonesia)
- Hilton Kelley (United States)
- Francisco Pineda (El Salvador)

=== 2012 ===
- Ikal Angelei (Kenya)
- Ma Jun (China)
- Yevgeniya Chirikova (Russia)
- Edwin Gariguez (Philippines)
- Caroline Cannon (United States)
- Sofia Gatica (Argentina)

=== 2013 ===
- Azzam Alwash (Iraq)
- Aleta Baun (Indonesia)
- Jonathan Deal (South Africa)
- Rossano Ercolini (Italy)
- Nohra Padilla (Colombia)
- Kimberly Wasserman (United States)

=== 2014 ===
- Desmond D'Sa (South Africa)
- Ramesh Agrawal (India)
- Suren Gazaryan (Russia)
- Rudi Putra (Indonesia)
- Helen Slottje (United States)
- Ruth Buendía (Peru)

=== 2015 ===
- Myint Zaw (Myanmar)
- Marilyn Baptiste (Canada)
- Jean Wiener (Haiti)
- Phyllis Omido (Kenya)
- Howard Wood (Scotland)
- Berta Cáceres (Honduras)

=== 2016 ===
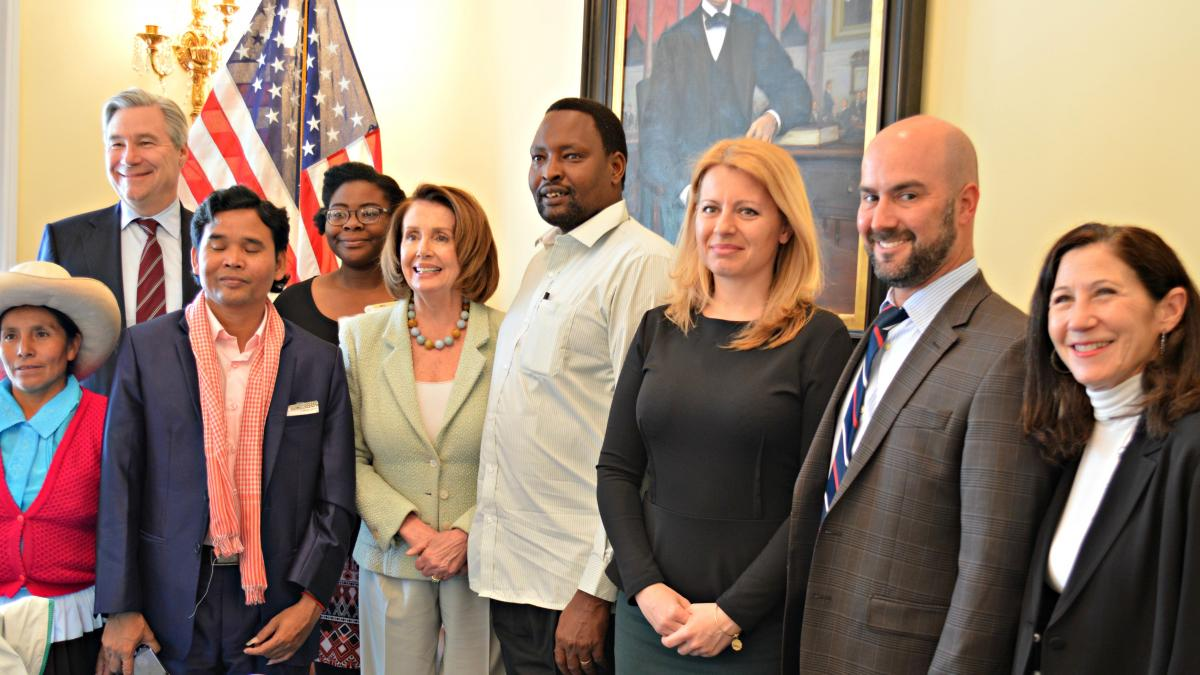
American congressional leader Nancy Pelosi is often present at the Prize awards ceremony; here in 2016, award winner Zuzana Čaputová would go on to be elected President of Slovakia

- Máxima Acuña (Peru)
- Zuzana Čaputová (Slovakia)
- Luis Jorge Rivera Herrera (Puerto Rico)
- Edward Loure (Tanzania)
- Leng Ouch (Cambodia)
- Destiny Watford (United States)

=== 2017 ===
- Wendy Bowman (Australia)
- Rodrigue Mugaruka Katembo (Democratic Republic of the Congo)
- mark! Lopez (United States)
- Uroš Macerl (Slovenia)
- Prafulla Samantara (India)
- Rodrigo Tot (Guatemala)

=== 2018 ===
- Manny Calonzo (Philippines)
- Francia Márquez (Colombia)
- Nguy Thi Khanh (Vietnam)
- LeeAnne Walters (United States)
- Makoma Lekalakala and Liz McDaid (South Africa)
- Claire Nouvian (France)

=== 2019 ===
- Bayarjargal Agvaantseren (Mongolia)
- Alfred Brownell (Liberia)
- Alberto Curamil (Chile)
- Jacqueline Evans (Cook Islands)
- Linda Garcia (United States)
- Ana Colovic Lesoska (North Macedonia)

=== 2020 ===
- Chibeze Ezekiel (Ghana)
- Kristal Ambrose (The Bahamas)
- Leydy Pech (Mexico)
- Lucie Pinson (France)
- Nemonte Nenquimo (Ecuador)
- Paul Sein Twa (Myanmar)

=== 2021 ===
- Gloria Majiga-Kamoto (Malawi)
- Nguyễn Văn Thái (Vietnam)
- Maida Bilal (Bosnia and Herzegovina)
- Kimiko Hirata (Japan)
- Sharon Lavigne (United States)
- Liz Chicaje Churay (Peru)

=== 2022 ===
- Chima Williams (Nigeria)
- Niwat Roykaew (Thailand)
- Marjan Minnesma (Netherlands)
- Julien Vincent (Australia)
- Nalleli Cobo (United States)
- Alex Lucitante and Alexandra Narváez Trujillo (Ecuador)

=== 2023 ===
- Zafer Kızılkaya (Turkey)
- Alessandra Korap Munduruku (Brazil)
- Chilekwa Mumba (Zambia)
- Tero Mustonen (Finland)
- Delima Silalahi (Indonesia)
- Diane Wilson (United States)

=== 2024 ===
- Sinegugu Zukulu and Nonhle Mbuthuma (South Africa)
- Alok Shukla (India)
- Teresa Vicente (Spain)
- Murrawah Maroochy Johnson (Australia)
- Andrea Vidaurre (United States)
- Marcel Gomes (Brazil)

=== 2025 ===
- Semia Gharbi (Tunisia)
- Batmunkh Luvsandash (Mongolia)
- Besjana Guri and Olsi Nika (Albania)
- Carlos Mallo Molina (Canary Islands)
- Laurene Allen (United States)
- Mari Luz Canaquiri Murayari (Peru)

=== 2026 ===
- Iroro Tanshi (Nigeria)
- Borim Kim (South Korea)
- Sarah Finch (United Kingdom)
- Theonila Roka Matbob (Papua New Guinea)
- Alannah Acaq Hurley (United States)
- Yuvelis Morales Blanco (Colombia)

== See also ==
- Environmental Media Awards
- Global 500 Roll of Honour
- Goldman School of Public Policy
- Grantham Prize for Excellence in Reporting on the Environment
- Heroes of the Environment
- Tyler Prize for Environmental Achievement
- List of environmental awards
