= Destiny Watford =

American environmental activist

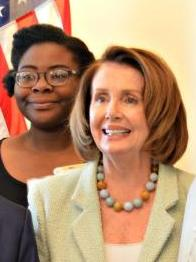
Destiny Watford (left) with Nancy Pelosi, 2016

Destiny Watford is an American environmental activist. She won a Goldman Environmental Prize in 2016.

== Biography ==
Watford was raised in Curtis Bay, Maryland, in an area with significant air pollution. While in high school, she started an advocacy campaign against an incinerator project that had been approved by the city and state, and could burn 4,000 tons of waste per day. Over four years, she led advocacy with other students at Benjamin Franklin High School based on concerns about the health impacts from more air pollution in the area, including the prevalence of asthma already experienced in the local community. Their work included research into land use and zoning policies, as well as lobbying school and government officials. In 2016, the Maryland Department of the Environment canceled the incinerator project.

She studied at Towson University. In 2018, she presented at the Facing Race Conference. At age 16, she co-founded the advocacy group Free Your Voice, which is now part of the human rights organization United Workers.

Watford works with Greenpeace as a climate change campaigner and has been involved in campaigns challenging the Texas LNG project, Sea Port Oil Terminal (SPOT), the Sur de Texas Tuxpan Pipeline and other activity.

== Awards and recognition ==
Watford has received a variety of awards and accolades, including the Goldman Environmental Prize in 2016, as well as recognition as a Birdland Community Hero in 2016, Time Next Generation Leader 2016, and Essence Work 100 Woman.

== Public speaking ==
Watford is a regular keynote speaker on environmentalism and environmental justice. Speaking credits include:

- Speaker at 2017 TEDxMidAtlantic
- Speaker at Facing Race National Conference 2018
- Keynote at 2018 University of Maryland Environmental Justice and Health Disparities Symposium
- Keynote at 2019 New Mexico Clean Energy Conference
- Keynote at 2019 Celebrating ‘The Power of 10’ Towson University Conference
