= Paul Sein Twa =

- Occupations: Environmentalist and indigenous activist
- Known for: Karen Environmental and Social Action Network (KESAN)
- Awards: Goldman Environmental Prize, 2020

Paul Sein Twa (born 1972 or 1973 (age 52–53)) is a Karen environmentalist and indigenous activist from Myanmar who works to preserve the culture and environment of the Salween River basin. He co-founded the Karen Environmental and Social Action Network (KESAN) in 2001 to help Karen indigenous communities the preservation and protection of their land and heritage. He received the Goldman Environmental Prize in 2020 for his efforts.

== Career ==
Sein Twa helped establish the Salween Peace Park, a transboundary protected area that aims to preserve the biodiversity and cultural heritage of the Salween River basin. He and KESAN worked with 348 villages representing approximately 68,000 Karen people to consult with the community and mobilize support for the park, which was established in December 2018. The park also rediscovered a traditional land governance system called Kaw, which prohibits the hunting of endangered species and reinforces the Karen people's connection to their ancestral lands.

== Recognition ==
In 2018, the Salween Peace Park received the Paul K. Feyerabend Award-- a World of Solidarity is Possible. In 2020, Sein Twa received the Goldman Environmental Prize in recognition of his efforts to mobilize Karen indigenous people. The IUCN Asia Regional Office plans to support indigenous peoples and local communities by prioritizing inclusive governance in its program for 2021-2024. As part of its collaboration with Sein Twa and KESAN on the Accelerating Tiger Recovery in Thailand-Myanmar Transboundary Region project, the IUCN Asia has also started discussions on water governance in the Salween River basin.
