= Carlos Mallo Molina =

Spanish marine conservationist and Goldman Prize recipient (born 1989)

- Born: 1989 (age 36–37); Galicia, Spain
- Occupations: Civil engineer; Marine conservationist
- Organization(s): CEO, Innoceana
- Awards: Goldman Environmental Prize 2025

Carlos Mallo Molina (born 1989) is a Spanish civil engineer and marine conservationist who is the CEO of Innoceana, an NGO which he founded in 2018. He became known for fighting to protect the Teno-Rasca marine strip in Tenerife from the construction of a port. He was awarded the Goldman Prize in 2025 in the Islands and Island Nations region for his work in Tenerife.

== Biography ==
Mallo Molina was born in Galicia, and studied Civil, Canal, and Port Engineering at the Technical University of Madrid. From a young age, he had a passion for scuba diving. After college, Mallo Molina moved to Tenerife, in the Canary Islands, where he worked on the design and construction team on a new highway. However, he soon discovered plans for a port his highway would connect to, called the Fonsalia Port, which would be built next to the Teno-Rasca Marine Strip. By 2018, after he moved to England for work, he decided to leave his job in civil engineering and found Innoceana to oppose the port.

As head of Innoceana, he led efforts to engage the media, provide educational information about Tenerife's marine life, build databases of biodiversity, and write technical reports on the problem with the port. He also created a virtual scuba diving experience to show Tenerife's marine life. Soon, they had collected over 420,000 signatures, and the government decided to reassess and ultimately cancelled the port in October 2021. Innoceana then began creating the first marine conservation and education center in the Canary Islands using funding from the European Union. Since then, Innoceana has worked on coral restoration in Costa Rica and seagrass restoration in the Canary Islands.

Mallo Molina was featured on the television program Living on Earth in May 2025. He was also featured by the web portal Mongabay. He was awarded the Goldman Prize in 2025 in the Islands and Island Nations region for his work in Tenerife. He was named an Edinburgh Ocean Leader in 2026.
