= Manana Kochladze =

Georgian biologist and environmentalist

- Born: c. 1972
- Education: Biologist
- Known for: Grassroots environmental activism
- Awards: Goldman Environmental Prize (2004)

Manana Kochladze (born c. 1971) is a Georgian biologist and environmentalist. She was awarded the Goldman Environmental Prize in 2004 for her environmental campaigns, in particular regarding oil pipelines through vulnerable areas.

Originally trained to be a scientist, she changed focus to become an environmental activist. In 1990 she founded the non-governmental organization Green Alternative.
