= Rudolf Amenga-Etego =

Ghanaian lawyer and environmentalist

- Occupation: Lawyer
- Awards: Goldman Environmental Prize (2004)

Rudolf Amenga-Etego (born December 17, 1958) is a Ghanaian lawyer and environmentalist. He was awarded the Goldman Environmental Prize in 2004, for his efforts in keeping water supplies affordable for the population and campaigning against the privatization of water in Ghana. The main opposition is the World Bank and the International Monetary Fund who are offering loans to the Ghanaian government to improve the water infrastructure across the country. The only drawbacks to these loans are their stipulations requiring the privatization of the water supply.

As a young lawyer, he found himself defending poor people who had not paid their water bills and those who were being persecuted for tapping into illegal water sources to survive. This struggle compelled him to dig deeper into the root causes of the water problem which is the landmark that led him all the way to the World Bank. He became interested in water in 1999 when his neighbors in the capital, Accra, complained that their water was cut off after rates nearly doubled and they fell behind in their payments. Backed by the World Bank, and the IMF, Ghana's government was readying its water system for privatization.

== Career ==
He obtained a Bachelor of Arts from the University of Ghana, an EMGL from the Ghana Institute of Management and Public Administration, and a Barrister at Law from the Ghana School of Law. He was awarded the Goldman Environmental Prize in 2004, for his efforts in keeping water supplies affordable for the population and campaigning against the privatization of water in Ghana. The main opposition is the World Bank and the International Monetary Fund, which are offering loans to the Ghanaian government to improve the water infrastructure across the country.

As the head of the Globalization Response Program for the Integrated Social Development Centre, Amenga integrity, warmth, and his unique ability to move between the worlds of the powerful, and the poor helped elevate water privatization as an important political and public health issue.

== Awards ==
He won 2004 Goldman environmental prize.
