= Julien Vincent =

Australian environmental activist (born 1980 or 1981)

- Born: 1980 or 1981 (age 45–46)
- Occupation: Environmental activist
- Awards: Goldman Environmental Prize (2022)

Julien Vincent (born 1980 or 1981) is an Australian environmental activist and campaigner. He is the founder and executive director of Market Forces, a nonprofit organisation that targets the financial institutions backing fossil fuel projects, particularly coal.

Vincent is best known for leading campaigns that pressured major banks and investors to withdraw funding from the coal industry, efforts that contributed to significant divestment commitments and earned him the 2022 Goldman Environmental Prize.
