= Teresa Vicente =

Spanish academic

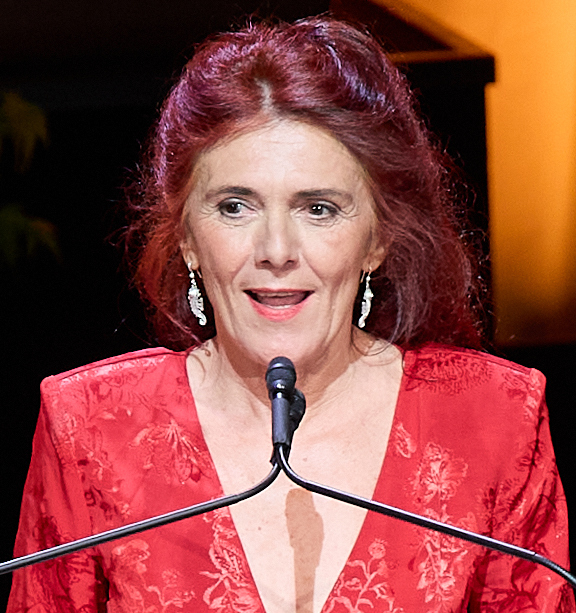
- Born: 1962 (age 63–64); Lorca, Spain
- Education: University of Murcia
- Occupation: Professor of Philosophy of law
- Employer: University of Murcia

María Teresa Vicente Giménez (born 1962) is a Spanish academic.

== Career ==
Born in Lorca in 1962, Vicente graduated with a law degree from the University of Murcia. She is appointed professor of philosophy of law at the University of Murcia, in the fields of human rights and rights of nature.

In 2023 she received the Honorary Volunteering Medal from the Council of Europe.

She was awarded the Goldman Environmental Prize in 2024, for her efforts on saving the largest saltwater lagoon in Europe, Mar Menor, from collapse.
