= Andrea Vidaurre =

American environmental justice advocate (born 1993/1994)

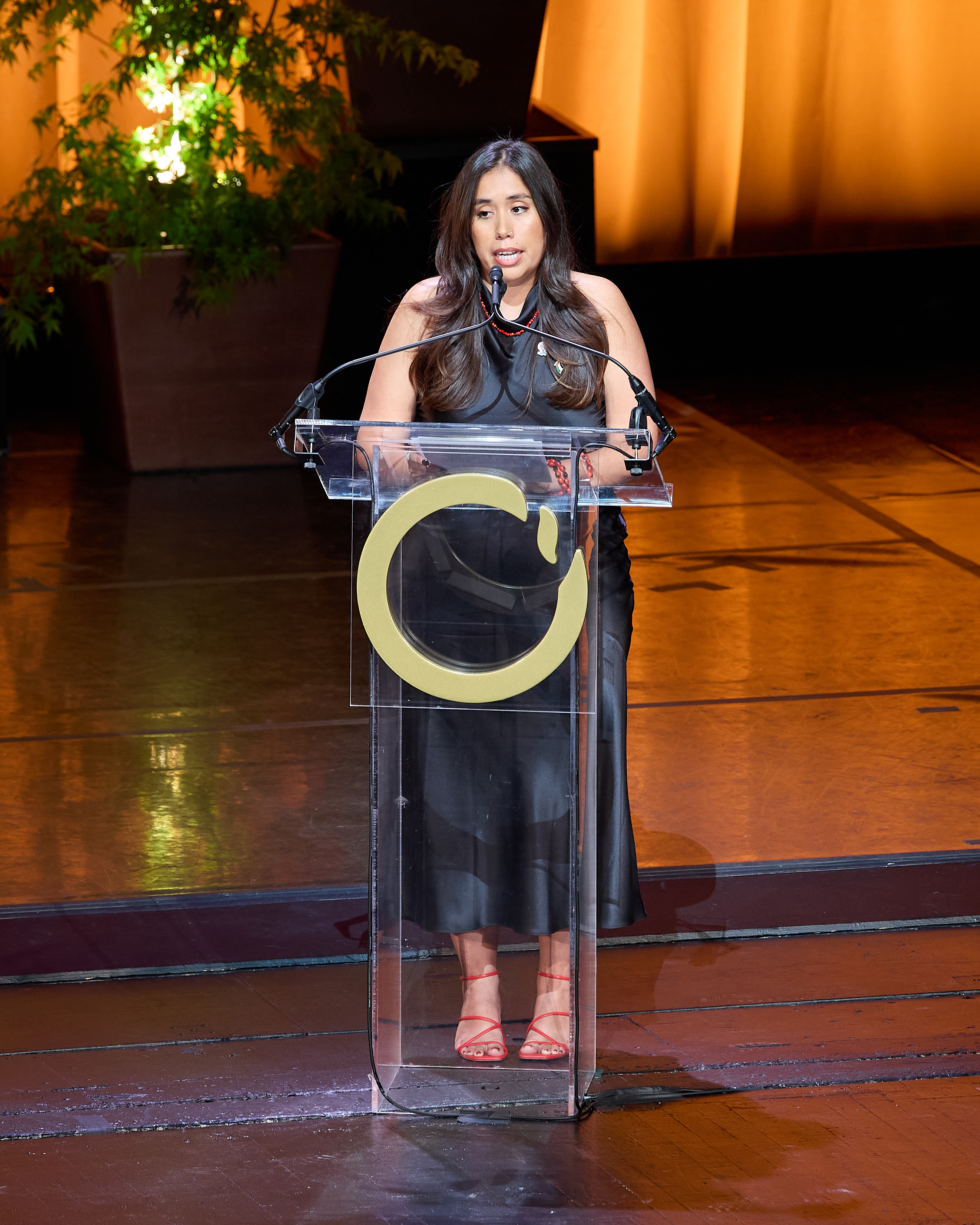
- Andrea Vidaurre during the award ceremony of the 2024 Goldman Environmental Prize
- Born: 1993 or 1994 (age 32–33); Inland Empire, California, U.S.
- Education: University of California, Riverside (BA)
- Occupations: Environmental justice advocate, policy analyst
- Known for: Environmental activism, co-founder of People's Collective for Environmental Justice
- Awards: Goldman Environmental Prize (2024)

Andrea Vidaurre (born 1993 or 1994) is an American environmental justice advocate and policy analyst, recognized for her efforts in addressing air pollution and public health issues linked to California’s Inland Empire freight industry. In 2024, she was awarded the Goldman Environmental Prize for North America in acknowledgment of her work on air quality and zero-emission policy advocacy in one of the country’s most heavily polluted regions.

== Early life and education ==
Of Peruvian descent, Vidaurre was born and raised in California's Inland Empire. She graduated from the University of California, Riverside with a Bachelor of Arts in global studies.

== Activism ==
Vidaurre co-founded the People's Collective for Environmental Justice, an organization dedicated to addressing the environmental health challenges faced by working-class, predominantly Latino communities in the Inland Empire, which includes Riverside and San Bernardino counties. The area has become one of the largest warehousing and logistics hubs in the United States, resulting in high levels of air pollution that disproportionately affect residents’ health.

As a policy analyst, Vidaurre played a critical role in advocating for the passage of two landmark regulations by the California Air Resources Board (CARB) in 2023. These regulations include the In-Use Locomotive Rule, which represents the nation’s first emissions regulation on train locomotives, and the California Advanced Clean Fleets Rule, aimed at achieving 100% zero-emission freight truck sales by 2036. These regulatory achievements are expected to substantially improve air quality for communities across California, setting a precedent for emissions reductions in freight transportation.

== Recognition ==
In 2024, Vidaurre received the Goldman Environmental Prize for North America, recognizing her leadership in grassroots activism and her impact on California's environmental policy landscape.
