= Alannah Acaq Hurley =

Yup'ik environmental and tribal advocate

Alannah Acaq Hurley is a Yup'ik environmental and tribal advocate from Alaska. She is the executive director of the United Tribes of Bristol Bay (UTBB), a coalition of tribal governments in the Bristol Bay region. She has been involved in opposition to the proposed Pebble Mine and received the 2026 Goldman Environmental Prize for North America.

== Early life and advocacy ==
Hurley grew up in the Yup'ik community of Saguyaq, also known as Clark's Point, in the Bristol Bay region of southwest Alaska. She was 40 years old when she received the 2026 Goldman Environmental Prize. She has identified her grandmother, Mancuaq, as an influence on her understanding of Yup'ik traditions and the Bristol Bay region.

Hurley's advocacy has focused on the cultural, environmental and economic significance of Bristol Bay's salmon fisheries to Indigenous communities. The Bristol Bay watershed supports large sockeye salmon runs and is an important fishing region for local communities. As executive director of UTBB, she has represented a coalition of tribal governments involved in efforts to restrict or prevent development of the Pebble Mine project.

== Pebble Mine opposition ==
The Pebble Mine project concerns a proposed copper, gold and molybdenum mine in the Bristol Bay watershed. Northern Dynasty Minerals acquired mineral leases associated with the deposit in 2001.

Hurley became involved in opposition to the project during summer breaks from college in the early 2000s, when she travelled to rural communities to discuss the proposed mine.

As executive director of UTBB, Hurley has worked with tribal governments, commercial fishermen, local residents and environmental organisations opposing the project. She represented the coalition in congressional testimony in 2019.

In January 2023, the United States Environmental Protection Agency issued a final determination under the Clean Water Act restricting the disposal of mining waste in the Pebble Deposit Area. The determination limited the development of the proposed mine in its then-planned form.

== Litigation ==
Northern Dynasty Minerals and other parties associated with the Pebble project have challenged the EPA determination in federal court. UTBB has participated in the litigation on behalf of Bristol Bay tribal interests and has also supported efforts to establish additional legal protections for the watershed.

In June 2026, proceedings concerning the EPA determination were scheduled in the United States District Court for the District of Alaska in Anchorage. Court filings by the project's developers estimated the value of the mineral deposit at approximately US$800 billion.

== Goldman Environmental Prize ==
In 2026, Hurley received the Goldman Environmental Prize for North America for her work with the Bristol Bay tribal coalition opposing the Pebble Mine. The award citation described her work as part of a campaign led by Bristol Bay tribal communities to protect the watershed.

All six recipients of the 2026 Goldman Environmental Prize were women, the first year in which the prize's six recipients were all women. Hurley has said that she viewed the award as recognition of the broader coalition and its work rather than solely of her individual role.
