= Chima Williams =

Nigerian climate activist

- Occupations: Activist and Environmental Lawyer
- Organization: Executive Director of the Environmental Rights Action/Friends of the Earth Nigeria (ERA/FoEN)
- Awards: Goldman Environmental Prize

Chima Williams is an environmental activist, an environmental lawyer who fights environmental injustice and held a multinational company like Shell to pay for damages they have caused and inflicted on some communities in the Niger-Delta. He is also the founder of the first Student environmental justice group in Nigeria. He was named the Earth's foremost defenders.

== Career ==
Chima Williams as a student joined the Nigerian Environmental Movement in the 1990s where he volunteered for Environmental Rights Action (ERA), an NGO which was created in 1993, which advocates for environmental rights in Nigeria. In 1998, Chima founded the first Student environmental justice group in Nigeria. He has been serving as an environmental lawyer prosecuting multinational companies on environmental pollution cases in Nigeria. In October 2020, He was appointed as the executive director of the Environmental Rights Action/Friends of the Earth Nigeria (ERA/FoEN). Environmental Rights Action (ERA) which is an advocacy NGO founded on 11 January 1993 in Nigeria to combat environmental human rights issues in Nigeria. ERA is the Nigerian chapter of Friends of the Earth International (FoEI)

== Awards ==
Chima Williams is one of the awardees of the 2022 Goldman Environmental Prize across the globe. He is the third Nigerian to get the award. The award was given for his work in protecting the earth by holding Royal Dutch Shell accountable for oil spillage from their facilities into the Niger Delta communities. The Goldman award is given to honour and appreciate the work of grassroots environmental activists across the world who are working to protect the earth
