= Lynn Henning =

American environmentalist

- Occupation: farmer
- Awards: Goldman Environmental Prize

Lynn Henning is a farmer and environmentalist from Michigan, United States. She was awarded the Goldman Environmental Prize in 2010 for her focus on water quality and for fighting pollution from concentrated animal feeding facilities. She exposed the polluting practices of livestock factory farms in rural Michigan, gaining the attention of the federal EPA and prompting state regulators to issue hundreds of citations for water quality violations. Henning currently works for the Socially Responsible Agricultural Project (SRAP). She also won the Planet Defender Award 2012 for her advocacy and her work.

== Environmental activism ==
Lynn Henning claims that livestock factory farms have to be held accountable for water and air quality. She gained attention through claiming on state and federal authorities to ensure them that these laws on water and air quality are not violated. She herself runs a 300-acres corn and soybeans farm in Lenawee County within 10 miles of 12 CAFO's - Concentrated animal feeding operations.

In 2000 a Michigan state park lake was polluted by a runoff, and the Hennings were blamed for blowing the whistle on a local Concentrated animal feeding operation (CAFO). Although this accusation was false, it inspired Henning for her work and led to the formation of the Environmentally Concerned Citizens of South Central Michigan (ECCSCM) with other neighbors. Henning and the ECCSCM began to bring the CAFO to justice and urged state and federal agencies to step forward and protect the environmental and public health of region. She started to collect information about CAFO pollution, took water samples from lakes, streams, rivers and wetland and as well about their point of origin. Henning then joined the Sierra Club's chapter in Michigan. With their support, Henning developed water quality monitoring programs to measure the pollution levels from CAFOs and documented their impact on local watersheds. Henning used also satellite imagery and GPS coordinates to document where the pollution was happening and how waterways were being affected. Henning and the ECCSCM brought together a body of data on CAFOs and managed that state regulators have to take stronger action, such as the Department for Environmental Quality (D.E.Q.). Her engagement led the D.E.Q. to enact hundreds of citations against Michigan CAFOs for their environmental violations. Furthermore, her findings and recommendations led to a denial of a proposed CAFO facility Fighting against CAFOs didn't come without any consequences for Lynn. She and her family have been threatened and harassed for being an environmental activist.

Henning regularly travels to assist other communities across the country to challenge CAFOs. Her techniques have been included in other CAFO investigations. The former head of US Environment Protection Agency Lisa P. Jackson said that her department would strengthen the regulation of the Clean Water Act which regulates CAFO waste.

Today Henning works for the Socially Responsible Agricultural Project (SRAP), together with this initiative she launched the national initiative "Water ranger program", which helps those who are affected by CAFOs to become citizen scientists.
