= Terri Swearingen =

American environmentalist

- Occupation: Nurse
- Known for: Grassroots environmentalism
- Awards: Goldman Environmental Prize (1997)

Terri Swearingen is a nurse from the state of Ohio.

She was awarded the Goldman Environmental Prize in 1997, for organizing the protests against Waste Technologies Industries' toxic waste incinerator in the Appalachian town of East Liverpool, Ohio.

One of her quotes were "We are living on this planet as if we had another one to go to." Swearingen's efforts influenced stricter nationwide limits for heavy metals and dioxin emissions from waste incinerators.
