= Albena Simeonova =

Bulgarian environmentalist

Albena Simeonova Varbanova (Bulgarian: Албена Симеонова Върбанова; born 1964) is a Bulgarian environmental activist. She is a key figure in the opposition to the Bulgarian Belene nuclear power plant.

== Education / Profession ==
Albena Simeonova studied at the Sofia University specializing in Biology and Chemistry. She completed a postgraduate degree with work in Ecology. She spent several years teaching at the secondary school level. From 1991 she worked as Senior Ecologist for the Botevgrad council administration.

She served as the Executive Director of the Foundation for Ecological Education and Training in Sofia from 1994 to 1996, this was next to serving as the Vice chair of the Bulgarian Green Party.

Since 1999 she has worked in the agricultural sector, being a pioneer of the organic movement in Bulgaria. In 2017, her exploitation extended on 275 hectares of organic cultures, which included cereals, vegetal farming and vineyards.

In 2009, she founded the Bulgaria’s Association of Bioproducers, of which she is president. She is also the Chair of the Foundation for Environment and Agriculture.

== Environmental Activities ==
Albena Simeonova was one of the first members of the Bulgarian Ekoglasnost environmental organisation in 1987. She founded the Bulgarian Green Party in 1991.

In 1996 Simeonova co-founded the Bulgarian Green Federation.

== Death threats ==
Her protest activities lead to serious threats. Starting 16 December 2004, Albena received the first of many anonymous telephone calls threatening to kill her if she would not stop her cooperation with Greenpeace and her resistance against Belene Nuclear Power Plant.

The death threats triggered an international cyberaction in support of Albena's safety which was supported by Greenpeace in cooperation with Bankwatch, Friends of the Earth Europe, WISE, ELAW and the Goldman Foundation. It resulted in police protection. Additional private protection was organised with support from the Goldman Foundation and Greenpeace.

== Awards and honors ==
She was awarded the Goldman Environmental Prize in 1996 for her initiatives to address environmental issues in Bulgaria.

In 1997 she received the UNEP Environmental Prize
