= Ramesh Agrawal =

Indian social worker and environmentalist

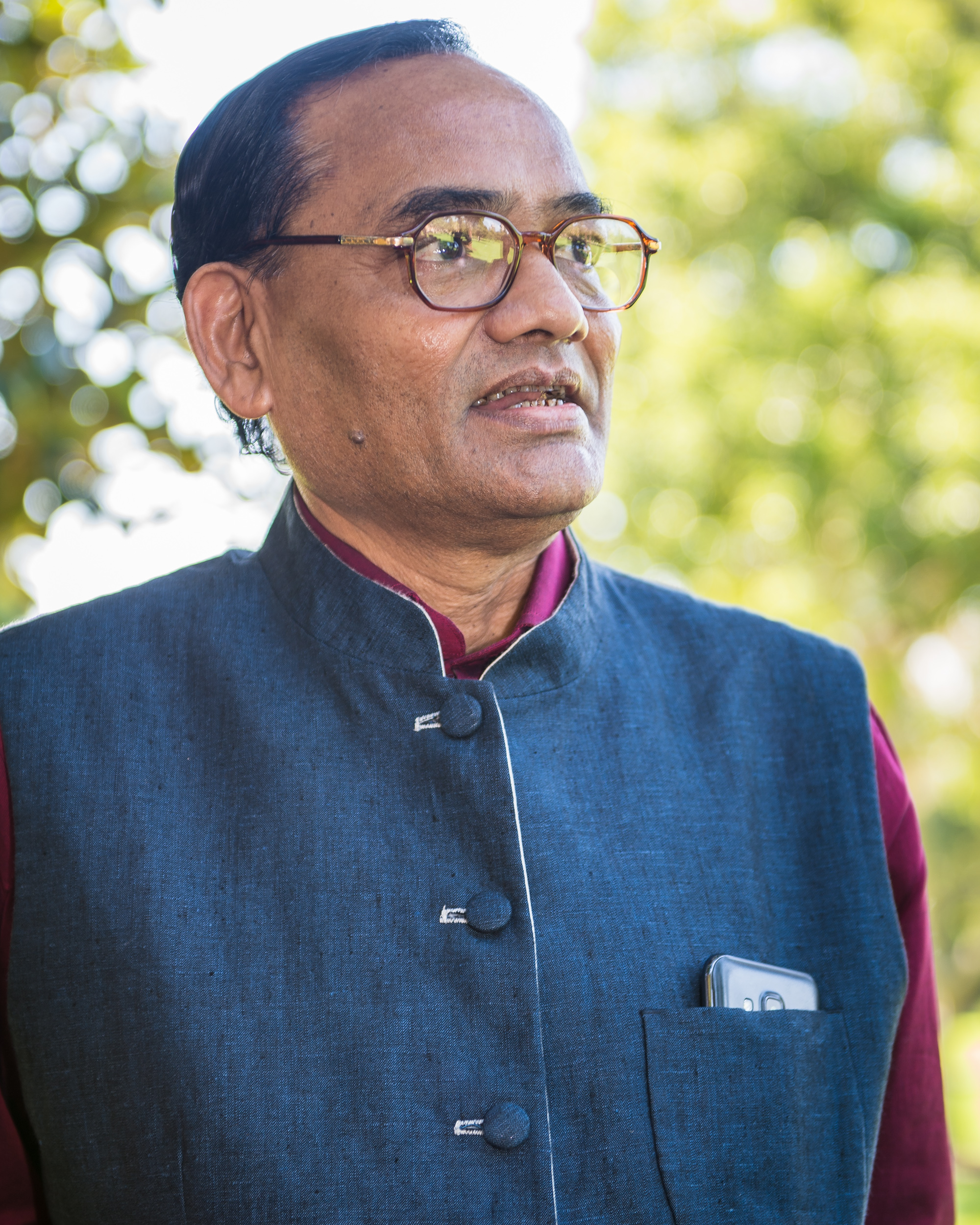
- Agrawal in 2016
- Occupations: Social worker; environmentalist
- Awards: Goldman Environmental Prize (2014)

Ramesh Agrawal is an Indian social worker, internet café owner and grassroots environmentalist from Chhattisgarh, who is a founder of group Jan Chetana (जन चेतना, meaning people's consciousness).

== Awards ==
He was awarded the Goldman Environmental Prize in 2014 for his efforts in organizing protests against certain industrialization plans in the region, and in particular informing citizens about environmental and social consequences of projected large-scale coal mining.
