= Sven Peek =

Sven (Bobby) Peek
- Born: 28 July 1966 (age 60); Overport, Durban, South Africa
- Education: St Joseph's Mission School, Aliwal North, St Henry's Marist Brothers, University of Durban Westville, now University of KwaZulu Natal.
- Occupations: Environmentalist Justice; Activist
- Employer: The Groundwork Trust
- Organization(s): groundWork, Friends of the Earth, South Africa
- Known for: Grassroots environmental justice activism
- Notable work: Bobby Peek founded and acts as the director of The Groundwork Trust, an NGO dedicated to environmental justice organising and working primarily in South Africa and across Africa.
- Awards: Goldman Environmental Prize (1998)

Sven Peek, best known as Bobby Peek, is an environmentalist and activist from Durban, South Africa. He was awarded the Goldman Environmental Prize in 1998, for his efforts on improvement of pollution problems in the region of South Durban.

Bobby Peek founded and acts as the director of Groundwork, an NGO dedicated to environmental justice service and developmental organization working primarily in South Africa.

== Work and career ==
Sven "Bobby" Peek, a resident of the heavily industrialized south of Durban, epitomizes the dynamic brand of activist tackling the plethora of environmental justice issues confronting South Africa in the post-apartheid era. Peek has put forth a lot of effort, working with local community organizations, to reduce the serious pollution issues in the south of Durban, where homes and businesses coexist. The valley, which is populated by working-class people, is also home to two oil refineries, one of which is the biggest in Africa, waste water treatment facilities, many toxic waste landfills, an airport, a paper mill, and a wide range of chemical process companies. Behind Peek's home is the Engen oil refinery, which spews out 60 tons of sulfur dioxide daily. More than 100 smoke stacks emit more than 54 million kg of sulfur dioxide annually in the south of Durban alone. Children in the neighborhood schools get respiratory illnesses at a rate that is three times higher than children who live outside the area, and hazardous leachate seeps into storm drains. One or more members of every family on Peek's street, including Peek's own, had lost to cancer. Peek has inspired others who live in an intricate multiethnic community to speak out for their rights because of his seemingly limitless energy. His efforts and ideas have attracted national notice. He has used the media skillfully to draw attention to the ongoing threats to the public's health in the area. President Nelson Mandela visited with the neighborhood in 1995 after they had protested the start of an Engen refinery expansion project. As a result, a gathering of all the interested parties was held, and Peek was elected chair of the newly formed South Durban Steering Committee for Environmental Management (SDSCEM). But over time, Peek came to understand how crucial it was for communities to first come together before interacting with business and the government. In order to unite the several different and previously racially separated residential groups, he established the South Durban Community Environmental Alliance (SDCEA). The local community was given a long-awaited hearing with the National Minister of Water Affairs on the closure of the Umlazi dump site—a toxic landfill operating without a permit—shortly after the meeting with President Mandela. Despite the minister's assurances that the illegal toxic dump would be looked into, it took additional demonstrations, this time from schoolchildren who were negatively affected by the location, before the illegal dump was eventually closed in 1997.

At the moment, Peek is the head of groundWork, a nonprofit provider of environmental justice services and a development agency with a focus mostly on South Africa.
