= Francisco Pineda (environmentalist) =

- Known for: Environmental activism
- Awards: Goldman Environmental Prize (2011)

Francisco Pineda is a Salvadoran environmentalist. He was awarded the Goldman Environmental Prize in 2011, for his efforts on protection of water resources in El Salvador against pollution from mining projects.

He resides in San Isidro, Cabañas.
