= Rosa Hilda Ramos =

Puerto Rican environmentalist

Rosa Hilda Ramos is the second Puerto Rican recipient of the Goldman Environmental Prize, a prestigious award given to grassroots environmentalists from around the world and popularly known as the "Green Nobel prize". A housewife and environmental activist based in her hometown Cataño, Puerto Rico, Ramos received the award for helping save the Las Cucharillas mangrove from development. She also successfully battled the area's main air polluter—the government-owned Puerto Rico Electric Power Authority (PREPA)-- forcing the public utility to dramatically reduce the lever of pollutants discharged into the atmosphere and forcing it to pay a $7 million federal fine.

The 2008 Goldman Environmental Prize, which includes a $150,000 monetary grant, was awarded to seven recipients in San Francisco, California on April 14, 2008.
