= Prafulla Samantara =

Indian environmental activist

- Born: 1952 (age 72–73); Odisha, India
- Nationality: Indian
- Education: Law and economics
- Known for: Grassroots environmentalism
- Awards: Goldman Environmental Prize (2017)

Prafulla Samantara (born 1952) is an Indian environmental activist from Odisha.

== Biography ==
Samantara has been a spokesperson for the Dangaria Kandha indigenous people, in their protest against plans for bauxite mining in the Niyamgiri hill range. A 2013 Supreme Court ruling stopped the mining plans. Samantara was awarded the Goldman Environmental Prize in 2017.

== Bibliography ==
- Prafulla Samantara (1 January 2005), Bajarikarana Jalaru Jalamukti Abhijan (in Odia), Lok Shakti Abhiyan, Wikidata Q107562430
