= Kory Johnson =

American environmentalist from Arizona

- Citizenship: American
- Known for: Grassroots environmental activism
- Awards: Goldman Environmental Prize (1998)

Kory Johnson is an American environmentalist from Arizona.

She was awarded the Goldman Environmental Prize in 1998, for her efforts against toxic and nuclear contamination.
