= Samuel Nguiffo =

Cameroonian lawyer

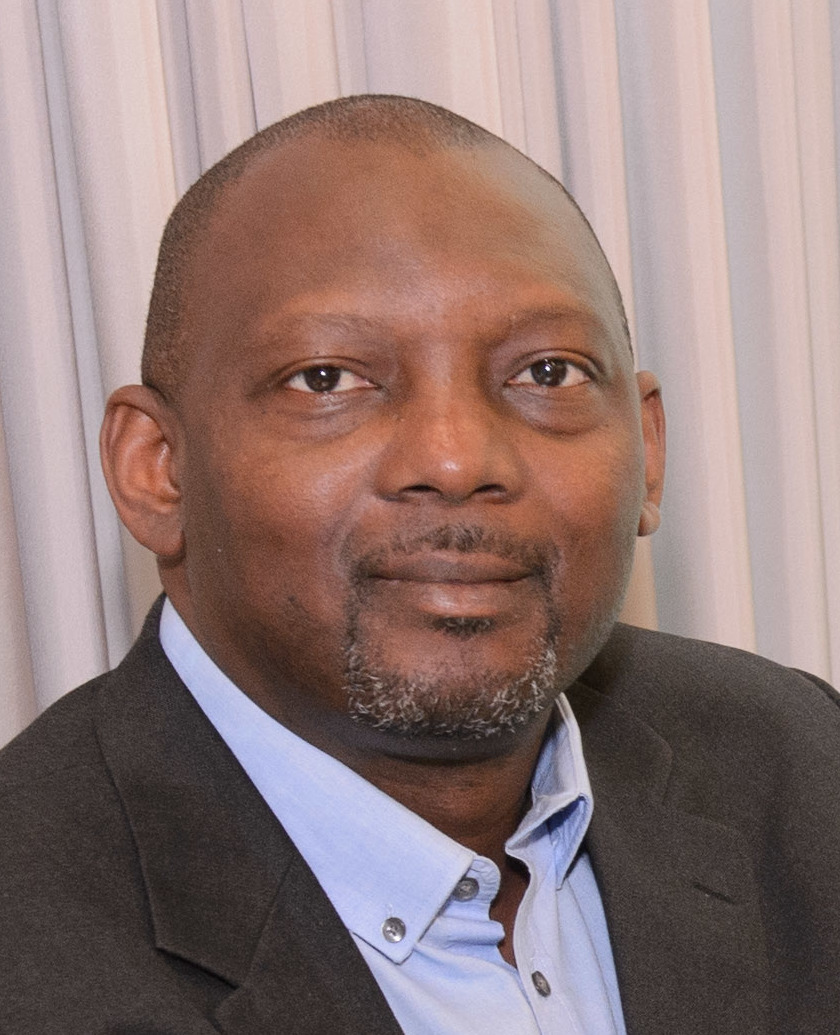
- Samuel Nguiffo in 2013
- Occupation: Lawyer
- Organization(s): Center for Environment and Development
- Awards: Goldman Environmental Prize (1999)

Samuel Nguiffo is a Cameroonian lawyer. He is manager of the Center for Environment and Development in Yaoundé. He was awarded the Goldman Environmental Prize in 1999, for his efforts on protection of the tropical rainforests of Central Africa.

== Achievements ==
In 2001, Samuel Nguiffo wrote a report on Dja Reserve which was published by Forest Peoples Programme. The reserve has been a source of conflict between the local communities in the area and Dja Reserve authorities

On July 13, 2003 Under his leadership as the chairman of Centre for Environment and Development (CED), CED alongside the Network for the Fight against Hunger (RELUFA) wrote a letter to the US Government as regards the land acquisition and exploitation of the US-owned palm oil farm; Herakles Farms in Cameroon South-west.

== Awards ==
Samuel Nguiffo was awarded alongside seven environmentalist at San Francisco at the 10th annual Goldman Prizes, he also won $125,000 from the Goldman Environmental Foundation.
