= Rodrigo Tot =

Guatemalan agriculture expert

- Born: c.1958 Laj Chimel, Quiché, Guatemala
- Education: None
- Occupations: farmer and indigenous leader
- Years active: 1974–present
- Awards: Goldman Environmental Prize

Rodrigo Tot (born c.1958) is a farmer and indigenous leader in Guatemala.

Tot is a member of the Q'eqchi' people. He was awarded the Goldman Environmental Prize in 2017 for his efforts to protect the land of his community from the environmental damages of mining.

== Early life ==
Tot was born in Quiché, Guatemala just before the mining rush of the 60s. Tot lost both of his parents at a young age and went to live with extended family in Agua Caliente at age 12.

== Career ==
=== Farming ===
In 1985, Tot, along with 63 other indigenous farmers in his community, received a property title to work on the land in their community. Three years later, however, records of these titles disappeared, and, when the final payments for the title were made, the people were denied the legal title of the land.

In 2004, two years after the farmers were denied the right to their land, the Guatemalan government granted a mining license for a region covering 16 Mayan communities. After the mining takeover, the Q'eqchi set out to fight for their land rights in court. In 2011, the group won their lawsuit and the Guatemalan Constitutional Court issued a landmark decision that recognized the Q'eqchi people's property rights.
