= Myint Zaw =

Burmese journalist and activist

- Occupations: Writer; Environmental Peace activist
- Awards: Goldman Environment Prize; Niwano Peace Prize Visionary Award

Myint Zaw is a Burmese environmental campaigner, civil society activist and writer. He was awarded the 2015 Goldman Environment Prize for Asia, for bringing forward environmental and social impacts from the planned Myitsone Dam, a large Irrawaddy River dam project that is estimated to have impacts on millions of people, and displacing about 18,000 inhabitants. In 2010, he and others issued the picture album and books on 'A River: The Ayeyarwady', and organized several exhibitions of photographs from the Irrawaddy. He earned his PhD in resources, environment and development from Crawford School of Public Policy at Australian National University (ANU), and an MA degree in International Development from Chulalongkorn University of Thailand.

He was 2024 recipient of the Niwano Peace Visionary Award.
