= Sviatoslav Zabelin =

Russian environmentalist

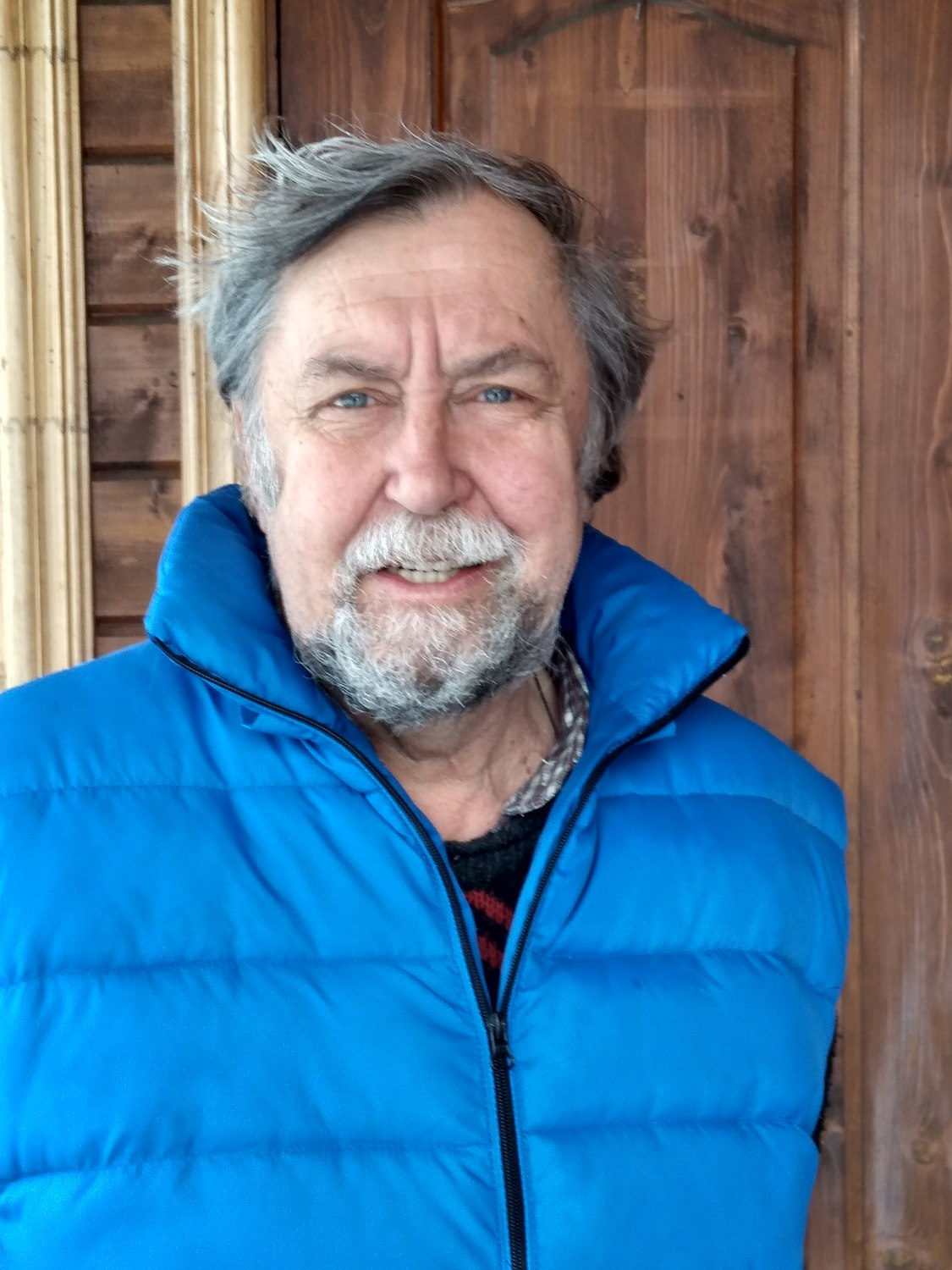
- Zabelin in 2017
- Born: September 23, 1950 (age 76)
- Known for: Grassroots environmentalism
- Awards: Goldman Environmental Prize (1993)

Sviatoslav Igorevich Zabelin (Russian: Святослав Игоревич Забелин; September 23, 1950 – October 10, 2026) is a Russian environmentalist. He is founder of the environmentalist network Socio-Ecological Union. He was awarded the Goldman Environmental Prize in 1993.
