= Anne Kajir =

Papua New Guinean attorney and environmentalist

- Born: c, 1974
- Occupation: Attorney
- Known for: Grassroots environmentalism
- Awards: Goldman Environmental Prize (2006)

Anne Kajir (born c. 1974) is an attorney from Papua New Guinea. She has uncovered evidence of widespread corruption in the Papua New Guinea government, that allowed illegal logging in tropical forests. Kajir was awarded the Goldman Environmental Prize in 2006.
