= Thuli Brilliance Makama =

Swazi environmental attorney

- Occupation: Environmental attorney
- Awards: Goldman Environmental Prize (2010)

Thuli Brilliance Makama is a Swazi environmental attorney. She is a Lawyer and the Executive Director of the green group Yonge Nawe/ Friends of the Earth Swaziland, an environmental organization that focuses on environmental justice. She was awarded the Goldman Environmental Prize in 2010. Being the Attorney of public interest for the environment in Swaziland, Thuli has strived to guarantee that the opinions of the local community are taken into account while making decisions concerning the environment. Thuli is Oil Change International's senior advisor for Africa, providing strategic direction and campaign support for the organization's work in the continent.

== Legal Actions ==
When the Swaziland Environment Authority Act was initially passed in 1992, there was a serious consideration given to the involvement of the public in decisions that would have an impact on the environment. In 2002, when this act was modified, the essence of public participation was fortified with a specific provision that mandated the inclusion of one representative from an environmental NGO in the Swaziland Environment Authority management board. However, the first minister of environment tasked with implementing this provision chose to disregard the law and exclude NGOs. Despite the pressure from Makama and her organization, Yonge Nawe Environmental Action Group, the minister refused to comply with the law. Faced with the alarming possibility that this disobedience could establish a precedent for future ministers, Makama and her organization decided to contest the minister’s actions in Swaziland’s highest court. In April 2009, three years into the lawsuit, the High Court of Swaziland supported Makama's stance and ruled that the Management Board of the Swaziland Environment Authority, as nominated by the environment minister, was unlawfully constituted. The court’s verdict ensures that environmental groups will now have a place on the Management Board, where they will be able to oversee the actions of the Environment Authority and include the legitimate perspective of the environmental justice movement in their discussions. The positive high court ruling has given hope to the local communities living near privately owned game reserves, that their struggles may finally be acknowledged by the appropriate authorities.

== Awards ==
Thuli was named one of the winners of the most prestigious environmental award, The Goldman Prize in 2010
