= Borim Kim =

South Korean climate activist (born 1994)

- Born: 1994 (age 31–32); Seoul, South Korea
- Occupations: Energy conservationist; Climate activist
- Organization(s): Founder, Youth 4 Climate Action
- Awards: Goldman Environmental Prize 2026

Borim Kim (Korean: 김보림; born 1994) is a South Korean energy conservationist and climate activist who is most known for being the founder and leader of Youth 4 Climate Change. She led the organization through Do-Hyun Kim et al v. South Korea, a case she organized, which resulted in the Constitutional Court ruling that the right to a clean environment includes the right to be protected from harms related to climate change. She received the 2026 Goldman Environmental Prize for Asia.

== Biography ==
Kim was born and raised in Seoul and attended Hanyang University, where she began in the Department of Computer Science but transferred to studying nanobioscience.

After college, she moved back to Seoul, where she worked on energy conservation, before becoming driven to climate activism by the 2018 Northeast Asia heat wave, where dozens in South Korea died from the heat and thousands more were made ill by it. Soon, she founded Youth for Climate Action, a largely youth-run group which began with climate strikes and school walkouts before moving to policy advocacy and protests. Despite the group not having official leadership positions, she is considered its leader.

She organized Do-Hyun Kim et al v. South Korea, a case about the right to a clean environment and the right for younger generations to have the effects of climate change mitigated. During the process of the case, she continued her activism, and had several positive results: Moon Jae-in pledged that South Korea would have net-zero emissions by 2050, South Korea ended overseas coal investments, and provinces began phasing out coal in public finance. The National Human Rights Commission of Korea submitted a letter to the South Korean Constitutional Court in support of Y4CA.

The court ultimately ruled in favor of the plaintiffs and Y4CA, resulting in requiring South Korea to set forward clear standards for reduction of emissions in alignment with international standards and science.

She was awarded the Goldman Prize, known as the Green Nobel, for Asia in 2026. This was the first time Korea had a Goldman Prize winner in 31 years. This year was also the first time all six Goldman Prize winners were women.

She was also featured on Living on Earth in 2026.
