= Cath Wallace =

New Zealand environmentalist and academic

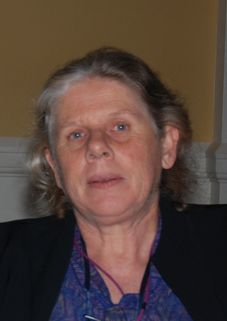
- Wallace in 2007
- Born: 1952 (age 73–74)
- Occupations: Academic and environmentalist
- Awards: Goldman Environmental Prize (1991)

Catherine C. Wallace (born 1952) is a New Zealand environmentalist and academic. She is a lecturer in economics and public policy at Victoria University of Wellington, and has been active in environment organizations in New Zealand. She was awarded the Goldman Environmental Prize in 1991, for her contributions to the protection of the environment of Antarctica.

== Political work and activism ==
Since 1987, Wallace has been a lecturer at Victoria University in Wellington in economics and public policy focussing on the environment. She was the chair of the Environment and Conservation Organizations of New Zealand (ECO) for over a decade. ECO is a non-profit network of organization with a concern for conservation and the environment. Wallace is still a board member of ECO. She was a member of the Council of IUCN, the World Conservation Union for two terms. Her main focus was on keeping environmental costs in mind in national decision making. She pushed for reforms in environmental and energy policies. As part of her activism she led a resistance movement together with other activists against business interests that were trying to curtail the Resource Management Act. This act is important for the protection of natural resources. In her position in ECO she advocated to change the national fishery law to be changed to manage the entire ecosystem instead of just managing the fish harvest. Wallace researched the effects of New Zealand's fishery quota management system and pressed the Ministry of Fisheries to stop violating its environmental responsibilities under the New Zealand Fisheries Act of 1996. Wallace continues to advocate for the implementation of strong local environmental policies throughout New Zealand. Wallace was also co-founder of the New Zealand arm of the Antarctic and Southern Ocean Coalition (ASOC) an international alliance that works for the comprehensive protection of Antarctica and repudiation of the Antarctic Minerals Convention. In association with ASOC she lobbied internationally on banning mining in antarctica. A major step in the protection of the Antarctic environment was made with the Antarctic Environmental Protocol. The protocol designates Antarctica as "a natural reserve, devoted to peace and science". Also known as the Madrid protocol it established rules for the protection of the environment and banned mining.

In 2008, she collaborated on the book SEAFOOD Ecolabelling Principles and Practice.
