= Mark! Lopez =

American community organizer and activist

mark! Lopez
- Born: 1985 or 1986 (age 40–41)
- Education: University of California, Santa Cruz; California State University, Northridge
- Occupations: Community organizer and activist
- Awards: Goldman Environmental Prize (2017)

Mark Lopez (born 1985 or 1986), better known as mark! Lopez, is an American community organizer and activist from Los Angeles County, California.

Lopez is best known for having persuaded the state of California to provide lead testing and cleanup for homes in East Los Angeles that had been contaminated and polluted by a battery smelter for over thirty years. He was awarded the Goldman Environmental Prize in 2017.
