= Vera Mischenko =

Russian attorney

- Occupation: Attorney
- Awards: Goldman Environmental Prize (2000)

Vera Mischenko is a Russian attorney. She introduced the concept of public interest environmental law in Russia and in 1991 co-founded Ecojuris, Russia's first public interest law firm. She was awarded the Goldman Environmental Prize in 2000.

== Campaigning ==
As a lawyer and environmental activist Mischenko's main focus and interest regards oil and gas industry which threatens the balance of marine ecosystems in the area of Caspian and Black Sea on the Russian border. Due to her broad legal expertise and engagement in NGOs activities, she intends to educate people about the hazards of oil development and wildlife exploitation in Russia. Together with a group of Ecojuris Institute lawyers, Mischenko established a number of national and international non-governmental organisations concerned with offshore preservation as well as she held a seminar in which Russian and American lawyers and NGO activist participated. It took place in St. Petersburg.

== Ecojuris Organisation ==
In the early 1990s, Mischenko was involved in the first environmental movements in Russia and succeeded to bring the cases of environmental injustice and damage to court. In order to do that she founded Ecojuris which was later registered under the name Ecojuris Institute of Environmental Law (1996, Moscow), the first Russian non-governmental environmental organisation (NGO) of a group of attorneys. She has been the president of Ecojuris since 1994. The organisation has stood for citizen's rights on environmental issues in order to protect people's health and wildlife conservation. The objectives of Ecojuris is to call for, initiate, and propose as well as draft legislation on the issues concerning the environment and human rights movements in Russia.
