= Craig E. Williams =

American activist (born 1948)

- Education: Eastern Kentucky University
- Organization: Vietnam Veterans of America Foundation
- Awards: Goldman Environmental Prize (2006)

Craig E. Williams (born c.1948) is an American army Vietnam War veteran from Kentucky and co-founder of the Vietnam Veterans of America Foundation. Williams was awarded the Goldman Environmental Prize in 2006 for his efforts on convincing The Pentagon to stop plans to incinerate decaying caches of chemical weapons stockpiled around the United States.

The Vietnam Veterans of America Foundation, along with other groups that formed International Campaign to Ban Landmines, received Nobel Peace Prize in 1997.

== Early life and education ==
Williams served in the United States Army from 1968 to 1969, including a deployment to South Vietnam during the Vietnam War. He graduated from Eastern Kentucky University in 1978.

Williams was among the founders of the Vietnam Veterans of America Foundation in 1980, and served at the organisation's board of directors for seventeen years.
