= Atherton Martin =

Dominican environmentalist

Atherton Martín
- Occupation: Agronomist
- Awards: Goldman Environmental Prize (1998)

Atherton Martin is a Dominican agronomist and environmentalist. He was awarded the Goldman Environmental Prize in 1998, for his efforts on protecting tropical forests from environments threats due to planned large copper mining operations.
