= José Andrés Tamayo Cortez =

- Born: 1958 (age 67–68)
- Occupations: Catholic priest and environmentalist
- Awards: Goldman Environmental Prize (2005)

José Andrés Tamayo Cortez (born 1958 in San Pedro, Honduras) is a Honduran Catholic priest and environmentalist, a leader of the Environmental Movement of Olancho and "the public face of the country's environmental movement". 2005 he was awarded with the Goldman Environmental Prize. After he was expelled from Honduras in 2009 he lived in exile in Nicaragua.

== Environmental Movement of Olancho ==
The Environmental Movement of Olancho (MAO) is a coalition of subsistence farmers and community and religious leaders in the Olancho Department who are defending their lands against uncontrolled commercial logging. Together they exerted heavy pressure on the Honduran government to reform its national forest policy. Olancho is a 24,000 square-kilometer land and forest reserve where unregulated logging has already destroyed half of Olancho's 12 million acres of forests.

"I saw the trees disappear and the rains diminish, and the peasants began to lose their crops and go hungry. So I decided to raise my voice in their defense." - Father José Andrés Tamayo

Father José Andrés Tamayo leads the campaigns with local communities in northern Olancho against intense deforestation and logging in the Olancho area. He has been intimidated and threatened several times. In October 2001 a police officer reportedly pointed his gun at Father José Andrés Tamayo during a demonstration calling for the protection of the environment. He was also under threat from local criminals who had reportedly been offered money to kill him because of his legitimate and peaceful environmental activism. Olancho town council member Carlos Luna was gunned down in 1998 while investigating claims of illegal logging in his municipality.

In 2003 Tamayo led a 3,000 person "March for Life" that traveled 120 miles to the capital, bringing environmental issues to the national spotlight for the first time in ages. A second "March for Life" in 2004 drew 5,000 people to protest corruption in the government's National Forest Agency, and the marches have inspired activists throughout the country to organize against environmental destruction. Three members of the Environmental Movement of Olancho Carlos Luna, Carlos Roberto Flores, and Mauricio Hernandez were shot and killed in 2003, including a 23-year-old priest.

2009 Father Tamayo reported that "we have stopped 80 per cent of the illegal logging... Last year the government declared a ban on the extraction of logs from several municipalities around Salama. The environmental activists want the wood to be processed locally into furniture and other goods before being shipped to the cities. We're creating a model for how to take advantage of our resources while also protecting them. The communities have to transform the resources, using them in a way that doesn't threaten their very life."

He was together with Manuel Zelaya in the Brazilian embassy in Tegucigalpa. Because of the 2009 Honduran constitutional crisis, Father Andrés Tamayo was deprived of Honduran nationality, was expelled from the country and was displaced from his parish in the municipality of Salamá.

== Award ==
He was awarded the Goldman Environmental Prize in 2005, for his efforts of organizing resistance against commercial logging in the Olancho Department.

== Film ==
Father Andrés Tamayo Cortez and MAO activities are documented in the Swedish film I bought a rainforest by Helena Nygren and Jacob Andrén.

== Resources ==
- Tripp York and Andy Alexis-Baker (Editors): A Faith Encompassing All Creation: Addressing Commonly Asked Questions about Christian Care for the Environment. 2014
- Center for International Policy: THE ILLEGAL LOGGING CRISIS IN HONDURAS, PDF
- Marching for Life: An Interview With José Tamayo
- Video: Environmental Movement of Olancho and Father Jose Andres Tamayo: 2005 Goldman Prize winner, Honduras
- Video: Speech Jose Andres Tamayo (spain with translation): 2005 Goldman Environmental Prize Ceremony
- Video: Invervista con P. Andres Tamayo, Fondazione Fontana (spain)
