= Jean Wiener (biologist) =

Jean Wiener is a Haitian marine biologist. He was awarded the Goldman Environmental Prize in 2015 for his efforts in successfully creating the Three Bays National Park, the country's first marine protected area to preserve the swath in Haiti's northern coast, while working with the community to promote sustainable fishing practices.

== Biography ==
Wiener who was born in Haiti, decided something needed to be done to preserve the environment after seeing firsthand the degradation of it growing up. Wiener studied biology at the University of Bridgeport, Connecticut, and returned to start the Fondation pour la Protection de la Biodiversité Marine (FoProBiM) in Haiti in 1992, with the goal to protect the environment, its coast and marine resources.
