= Rossano Ercolini =

Italian teacher and grassroots environmentalist

- Occupation: Schoolteacher
- Known for: Grassroots environmentalism
- Awards: Goldman Environmental Prize (2013)

Rossano Ercolini is an Italian teacher and grassroots environmentalist from Tuscany. He was awarded the Goldman Environmental Prize in 2013, in particular for his efforts on informing the public on health and environmental risks of incineration, and for his advocating for the zero waste principles. He is a director of Centro di Ricerca Rifiuti Zero del Comune di Capannori.
