= Jadwiga Łopata =

Polish organic farmer

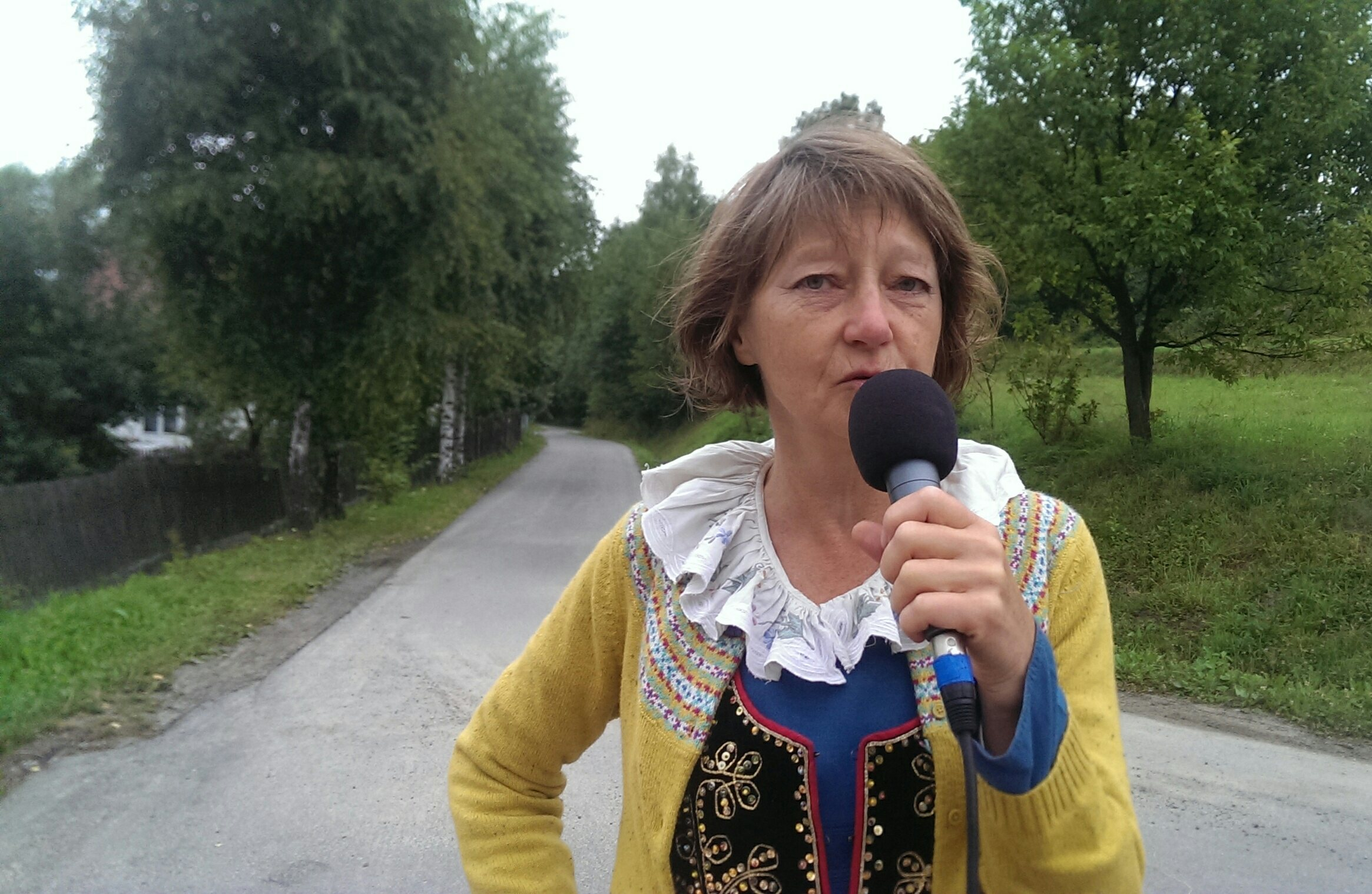
- Occupation: Farmer
- Awards: Goldman Environmental Prize (2002); Cross of Merit (2009)

Jadwiga Łopata is an organic farmer.

She lives near Kraków, Poland. She was awarded the Goldman Environmental Prize in 2002, for her works on rural protection. She is co-founder and co-director of the International Coalition to Protect the Polish Countryside (ICPPC).

Łopata was awarded the Polish Cross of Merit in 2009.
