= Odigha Odigha =

Nigerian educator and activist

- Born: Odigha; Cross River state
- Education: University of Lagos, University of Calabar.
- Occupations: Educator; Environmentalist; Activist
- Known for: Grassroots environmental activism
- Awards: Goldman Environmental Prize (2003)

Odigha Odigha is a Nigerian educator, environmentalist and activist. He is the founder of Nigeria NGO Coalition for the Environment. He was awarded the Goldman Environmental Prize in 2003, for his efforts on protection of the rainforests of Cross River State from industrial logging. According to Grist News, he said, "If you fight and run away, you'll live to fight another day. If you die in this struggle, your struggle may not continue." Odigha's focus was on the protection of the Cross River rainforest and on sustainable development for rainforest communities which began since 1994.

As an activist, Odigha pursued a political experience that served him well. He was also part of the Ijagham community of Cross River State. Together with the governor of Cross River State, Donald Duke, Odigha managed to set up the first ever forestry commission in Nigeria and obtain a first logging moratorium in 2000.

== Early life ==
Odigha attended St. Peter's Primary School, Ekpokpa, Ikom Local Government Area, between 1968 and 1970 and later St. Mary's Primary School, Agbaragba, in the same Local Government Area in 1971. After his primary education, he proceeded to St. Brendan's Secondary School, Iyamoyong, in Obubra Local Government Area, Cross River State, from 1972 to 1976.

== Education ==
He also proceeded to University of Calabar, Cross River State, between 1976 and 1980, where he obtained a B.Sc. degree in mathematics/statistics in 1980.

He enrolled for an MBA degree at the University of Lagos in 1983.

Odigha is a graduate of the University of Calabar with a bachelor's degree in mathematics/statistics. He also enrolled for an MBA degree at the University of Lagos.

== Political life ==
He started his political life as the;

- Community Leader of Etungba Ofutop, Ikom Local Government Area in 1982.
- In 1983, he was the Chairman, Fafunwa Hall (PG) for Post Graduate Students.
- He was also elected Leader, Post Graduate Students at the University of Lagos in 1984.
- He was the Founding Secretary, Cocoa Producers & Buyers Association in Ikom in 1986.
- He was Cross River State Organising Secretary, People's Front of Nigeria (Unregistered Political Association) in 1988.
- He was the Director of Campaigns (Social Democratic Party), Cross River State Governorship/House of Assembly Elections in 1991.
- He Contested as Chairman, Non Party Local Government Area, Ikom in 1987.
- He also contested for the Governorship seat of Cross River State under the platform of Social Democratic Party in 1992.
- That same year, he again contested the Cross River Central Senatorial Seat.
- He was appointed the Cross River State Coordinator for late Shehu Musa Yaradua Presidential Campaign in 1993.

== Award and recognition ==
2003: Goldman Environmental Prize

== Arrest ==
In 2016 Odigha was reportedly arrested on the orders of Ben Ayade, the executive governor of Cross River State. Odigha was held at the police headquarters in Diamond Hill, Calabar, following an audit of the Cross River State Forestry Commission (CRSFC), where he had been chairman. Odigha's lawyer disclosed that Odigha was accused of embezzling over ₦100 million, and was said to be unable to account for money paid to him and officials for travel expenses.

== See also ==
- Ken Saro-Wiwa
