= Hilton Kelley =

American environmentalist

- Occupation: Actor
- Known for: Grassroots environmental activism
- Awards: Goldman Environmental Prize (2011)

Hilton Kelley is a former American actor and environmentalist from Port Arthur, Texas. He was awarded the Goldman Environmental Prize in 2011, for his fight against pollution of the Port Arthur district from petrochemical industry and waste facilities.
