= Kaisha Atakhanova =

Biologist, social activist of Kazakhstan

- Born: 18 July 1957 (age 69); Karaganda, Kazakhstan
- Education: Karaganda State University
- Awards: Goldman Environmental Prize

Kaisha Atakhanova (born 18 July 1957) is a biologist from Karaganda, Kazakhstan, specializing in the genetic effects of nuclear radiation. Due to her civil society activism, she was awarded the international Goldman Environmental Prize in 2005 for leading a campaign to prevent nuclear waste from being commercially imported into Kazakhstan.

Atakhanova is founder and former leader of the Karaganda Ecological Center (known as EcoCenter).

== Early life ==
Atakhanova was born in Karaganda, Kazakhstan. Her father was a coal miner and also fought in the Second World War. Growing up, she felt comfortable in nature and had a strong interest in animals, which led her to study biology and become an environmental activist. The effects of radiation have affected her family, as both her parents and her sister have died from cancer. Her only other sibling, a brother, was also diagnosed with cancer..

== Career and research ==
After graduating in biology from Karaganda State University, Atakhanova began environmental and biological research. Following her interest on the effects of nuclear waste in Kazakhstan, she specialized in the genetic effects of nuclear radiation on amphibians, focusing primarily on frogs.

She did research in the Semipalatinsk Test Sit, also known as the polygon, which was a testing site for Soviet nuclear weapons. Through this research, she was able to study the effects of radiation on people and animals that had been directly affected.

In 1992, she founded the Karaganda Ecological Center (EcoCenter), which allowed her to work directly with people who have been exposed to radiation. The purpose of this was to inform people of how exposure to radiation could affect their living conditions. Through the EcoCenter, Atakhanova was able to lead a successful campaign to prevent nuclear waste from being commercially imported and disposed of in Kazakhstan.

== Personal accomplishments ==
As well as EcoCenter, she is also a founding member of the Women's Earth Alliance (WEA), an organization that seeks to empower women and equip them with the skills and tools needed to protect the earth.

== Awards ==
- 2005 Goldman Environmental Prize recipient.

== See also ==
- Nuclear energy in Kazakhstan
