= Humberto Ríos Labrada =

- Occupations: Agricultural scientist; Folk musician
- Awards: Goldman Environmental Prize (2010)

Humberto Ríos Labrada is a Cuban folk musician, agricultural scientist and environmentalist. He was awarded the Goldman Environmental Prize in 2010, for his work for biodiversity and sustainable development of Cuban agriculture.
