= Nohra Padilla =

Colombian environmentalist

- Organizations: Association of Recyclers of Bogotá; National Association of Recyclers in Colombia
- Awards: Goldman Environmental Prize (2013)

Nohra Padilla is a Colombian environmentalist. She grew up in Bogotá. She has assumed a leading position in the Association of Recyclers of Bogotá, and of the National Association of Recyclers in Colombia, which organizes about 12,000 members. She was awarded the Goldman Environmental Prize in 2013 for her contribution to waste management and recycling in Colombia.

== Background ==
Padilla grew up in a relatively poor family, and while a schoolgirl, from the age of 7, she helped her family with collecting recycles at the Bogotá municipal dump site. After finishing secondary school, she could not afford further education, and pursued with recycling for a living. Along with other "informal" (unpaid) recyclers, she co-founded the recycling association Asociación de Recicladores de Bogotá (ARB) in 1990, aiming to improve conditions for the waste pickers, eventually assuming the position of executive director of the association. The National Association of Recyclers in Colombia was founded in 1993. As of 2016, the Association of Recyclers of Bogotá (ARB) represented 3,000 informal recyclers in Bogotá, while the National Association of Recyclers in Colombia (ANR) had 12,000 members. Originally the waste-pickers' sole income has been from resale of wasted items, but this changed in Bogota in 2013, when a public payment system was introduced, also including social security, medical aid and pensions.

Padilla has eventually attended the university for studying public administration. She was awarded the Goldman Environment Prize in 2013.
