= Tuy Sereivathana =

Cambodian environmentalist

- Born: 1970 (age 55–56)
- Awards: Goldman Environmental Prize (2010)

Tuy Sereivathana (born 1970) is a Cambodian environmentalist who has worked to resolve conflicts between elephants and people in Cambodia. He was awarded the Goldman Environmental Prize in 2010.

In 2011, he was selected as a member of the National Geographic Emerging Explorer Program.
