= Edward Loure =

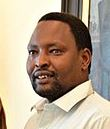
- Edward Loure in 2016
- Organization: Ujamaa Community Resource Team
- Awards: Goldman Environmental Prize

Edward Loure is a Tanzanian tribal activist. He is a member of the Maasai people. Loure was awarded the Goldman Environmental Prize in 2016, for his efforts of defending the Maasaian traditional way of life, which has been threatened by commercial tourism.

== Life and work ==
Edward Loure grew up in a pastoral tribal community in the Simanjiro plains, near Tarangire National Park. His family raised cattle and lived a semi-nomadic lifestyle. Motivated by his upbringing, he dedicated his efforts to the Ujamaa Community Resource Team (UCRT) in order to safeguard the Maasaian way of life. Traditionally, pastoralist communities coexisted with migratory wildlife while subsisting off the land. The Maasai seasonally move their herds, managing their livestock to prevent overgrazing and help maintain the ecosystem. As a young man, Loure became aware that the Maasai people's lands were being reduced and their access restricted due to the growth of tourism and the creation of national parks. This has led to some Indigenous peoples being displaced from their native lands, becoming conservation refugees. Furthermore, the government engaged in covert land sales to the safari and game-hunting industries without first engaging with local indigenous populations.

Loure led the UCRT movement, with the support of Maasai elders, to secure communal rights for their land. This work resulted in the Tanzanian government issuing the first-ever Certificate of Customary Right of Occupancy (CCRO) to a member of the Maasai community. As of 2021, through the use of CCROs the UCRT movement has secured 200,000 acres (81,000 ha) of rangeland. The UCRT movement aims to promote the CCRO model and community-based land titling throughout Tanzania.
