= Raoul du Toit =

- Born: Raoul Fredric du Toit; 1957 or 1958 (age 68–69); Zimbabwe
- Education: University of Cape Town (MS)
- Occupations: Environmentalist, zoologist
- Known for: Efforts on protection of the black rhino
- Awards: Goldman Environmental Prize (2011)

Raoul Fredric du Toit (born 1957 or 1958) is a Zimbabwean environmentalist. He was awarded the Goldman Environmental Prize in 2011, for his efforts on protection of the black rhino. Since 1986, Raoul du Toit has helped in coordinating rhino conservation initiatives in Zimbabwe, working tirelessly through the turmoil and turbulence of Robert Mugabe's dictatorship. He is the Africa Rhino Program Coordinator for the International Rhino Foundation, as well as director of the Lowveld Rhino Trust which he founded.

In an interview, he described the black rhino problem as "it was a pretty simple cross-border poaching problem into Zimbabwe".

In 1990, while working with the World Wildlife Foundation du Toit founded the Lowveld Rhino Conservancy Project. Raoul du Toit is now director of the Lowveld Rhino Trust in Southern Zimbabwe.

== Works ==
In 1982, du Toit undertook post-graduate training at the University of Cape Town, he is a biologist with degrees in zoology and environmental studies. In 1985, he was designated as a Scientific Officer for the IUCN (International Union for Conservation of Nature) African Elephant and Rhino Specialist Group, moving away from his prior professional focus on carrying out Environmental Impact Assessments. In 1988, du Toit developed a WWF project to investigate the condition of black rhinos in the Zambezi Valley and remained a Project Executant with WWF until 2009. In 1990, du Toit was assigned from WWF to the Zimbabwean Department of National Parks and Wildlife Management, where he labored for seven years to commence and execute the Rhino Conservancy Project in Zimbabwe (funded by the Beit Trust, through WWF). This project required establishing practical rhino breeding groups in the semi-arid Lowveld region of Zimbabwe, blending game ranches into vast conservancies to provide sufficient habitat, setting up protection and monitoring systems, and aiding in addressing the persistent economic and political obstacles to these private sector projects.

He transformed the southern areas of Zimbabwe which were cattle ranching areas into wildlife land in order to create a long-term enabling environment for rhino conservations, to spread burden away from the state and encourage tourism.

Presently, the black rhinoceros populace in the Lowveld area has been stabilized due to the efforts that du Toit has coordinated. Even though the disturbance that has endangered rhinoceros populations in the southern part of Zimbabwe since 2000, there are currently 350 black rhinoceroses in the area.

== Awards ==
- Raoul was honored with the Sir Peter Scott Award for Conservation Merit in 2009 to acknowledge his outstanding endeavors and accomplishments in the domain of African rhinoceros conservation.
- Raoul's conservation work also saw him awarded the Goldman Environmental Prize in 2011, an honour which saw him travel to the White House to meet U.S. President Barack Obama.
