= Loir Botor Dingit =

Indonesian environmentalist

- Died: 2005
- Occupations: Farmer; Paramount chief
- Awards: Goldman Environmental Prize

Loir Botor Dingit (died 2005) was a rattan farmer and Paramount Chief from Indonesia. He was awarded the Goldman Environmental Prize in 1997 for his efforts on forest protection.

== Early life ==
Coming from the Bentian people, Loir Botor Dingit was a rattan farmer. The rattan farming techniques involves conserving forest biodiversity. In July 1996, Loir was selected to be the Paramount chief by the Bentian Tribal Council.

== Who did he oppose? ==
Chief Loir opposed tycoons such as Mohammad “Bob” Hassan, who was Indonesia’s leading tycoon at the time. While he gained a lot of recognition from the government and international entities, he was being opposed due to the environmental footprint he was leaving. The article talks about the destructive practices and methods on forests from Mohammad “Bob” Hassan. However, Loir Botor Dingit did not stand for this. In this source, Chief Loir opposes Hassan because he wanted to protect forests and uphold customary rights. Loir’s efforts directly challenged the exploitation Hassan benefitted from.

== Actions ==
Since timber corporations have been terrorizing the lands in which Loir had been cultivating, he had begun to bring light to the situation at hand at an international level. Loir was one of the first leaders to unite the Bentian people with other Dayak tribes, who had been historically at war over ancestral lands.

== Accomplishments ==
As a result of this newfound peace, Dingit and the Bentian people began petitioning for their forested territories. Although Loir was charged of forgery for using dead people’s names, their efforts were noticed and eventually some of their lands were given back. In 1998, the court’s ruling not only got rid of Chief Loir’s charges, but also recognized the existence of indigenous people in Indonesia and their territorial rights. As a result, the rights of indigenous land rights and environmental conservation were starting to become a thing in Indonesia.

== Impact ==
"Whose Resources? Whose Common Good?" is a book regarding environmental justice and indigenous land rights in Indonesia. Loir Botor Dingit has a section dedicated just for him in this book. In this book, Loir Botor Dingit is highlighted as a powerful example of someone who demonstrated and led indigenous resistance and leadership. His efforts to lead the Bentian people with Dayak groups are talked about when he fought against the logging companies. Chief Loir’s advocacy for customary land rights, his role in drawing national and international attention to indigenous environmental struggles are talked about. Loir Botor Dingit’s efforts demonstrate the tensions between state control and community-based property rights.
