= Carlos Alberto Ricardo =

Brazilian environment pioneer

Alberto Ricardo
- Organization(s): Center for Ecumenical Documentation and Information (CEDI)
- Awards: Goldman Environmental Prize (1992)

Carlos Alberto Ricardo is a Brazilian environment pioneer. He was awarded the Goldman Environmental Prize in 1992, for his contribution to environment policy in Brazil.
