= Dmitry Lisitsyn =

Russian environmentalist

- Known for: Grassroots environmental activism
- Awards: Goldman Environmental Prize (2011)

Dmitry Lisitsyn is a Russian environmentalist. He was awarded the Goldman Environmental Prize in 2011, for his efforts on protection of the ecosystems of the island of Sakhalin.
