= Nguyễn Văn Thái =

Vietnamese conservationist

Nguyễn Văn Thái is a Vietnamese conservationist who works to protecting the Critically Endangered pangolin. In 2014, he founded Save Vietnam's Wildlife (SVW), an NGO that has rescued more than 2,125 wild animals from 45 species, including 1,671 pangolins, and rehabilitated and returned over 60% of them back to the wild.

In 2018, he established Vietnam's first anti-poaching unit, responsible for protecting wildlife habitats in Pu Mat National Park, and in 2021, this model was expanded to four additional national parks in Vietnam. Thái has helped bring about an 80% decrease in poaching in Vietnam and has educated over 11,000 people about the importance of pangolin conservation. He was a recipient of the 2022 National Geographic Wayfinder Award and the 2021 Goldman Environmental Prize.

== Career ==
Thái joined the Asian Pangolin Conservation Program (APCP) based in Cuc Phuong National Park as a volunteer in 2005, later becoming the program coordinator for captive management of carnivores and pangolins. During this time, he co-authored several papers that have been published in international journals and completed various research projects.

In 2014, Thái founded Save Vietnam’s Wildlife (SVW), a non-profit organization headquartered in Cuc Phuong National Park in Vietnam’s North Central Coast region. Since its establishment, SVW has rescued over 2,125 wild animals from 45 species, including 1,671 pangolins, and rehabilitated and returned over 60% back to the wild. In June 2018, Thái helped establish Vietnam’s first anti-poaching unit, responsible for protecting wildlife habitats in Pu Mat National Park. As of 2022, this unit has destroyed almost 10,000 animal traps, dismantled 775 illegal camps, and arrested 558 people for poaching.

In addition to his work with SVW, Thái has also focused on education and outreach efforts to raise awareness about pangolin conservation. He developed Vietnam’s first reintroduction and tracking protocols for pangolins and wrote husbandry manuals for rescued pangolins. In 2017, he opened Vietnam’s first wildlife education center that focuses on pangolins. He has also worked with the management authority of the Convention on International Trade in Endangered Species (CITES) to upgrade pangolins to Appendix I, a designation that bans international trade for animals most threatened with extinction.

=== Recognition ===
In 2021, Thái was recognized for his efforts with the Goldman Environmental Prize. He is the second Vietnamese to receive this award. He is also a 2022 National Geographic Wayfinder Award recipient.
