= Linda Garcia (environmentalist) =

American environmental activist

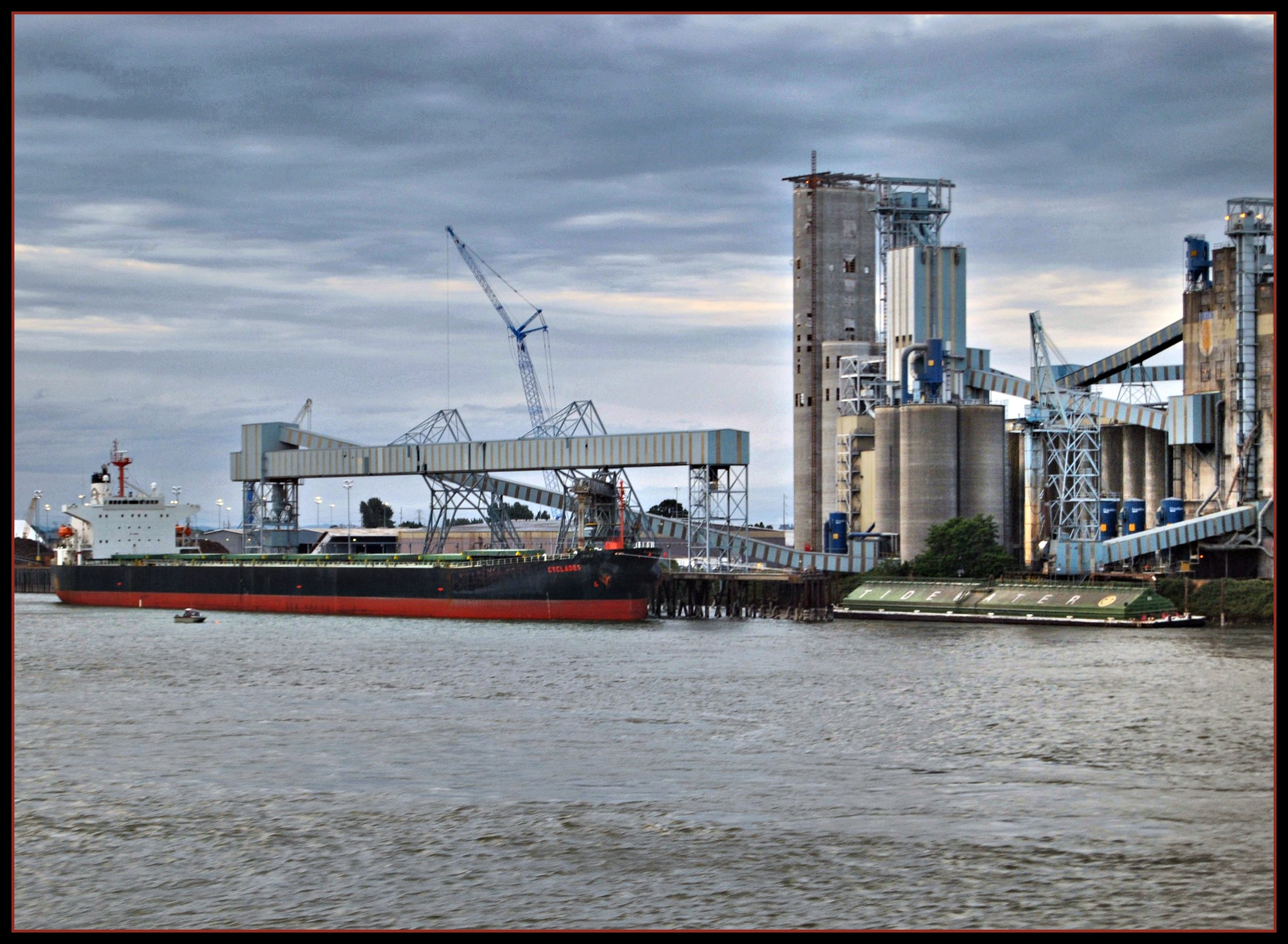
Port of Vancouver, Washington

Linda Garcia (born c.1969) is an American environmental activist from Vancouver, Washington. In 2013, she heard of plans for a Tesoro Savage oil terminal in the Port of Vancouver, designed to be America's largest. After examining the company's records, she led a campaign against the project, successfully rallying public opposition. In January 2018, Governor Jay Inslee refused the necessary permits, putting an end to the project. In recognition of her efforts, in April 2019 Garcia was one of six environmentalists to be awarded the Goldman Environmental Prize.

== Early life ==
In 1969, Garcia was born in Wilmington, Delaware.

As a child, Garcia suffered from smells from the chemical plants in the area.

== Career ==
In April 2013, Garcia became aware of plans for developing the Tesoro Savage oil terminal not far from her home in Fruit Valley, Vancouver, she became concerned that the resulting pollution could be detrimental to the health of her son's pulmonary hypoplasia and her daughter's chronic asthma.

As leader of the Fruit Valley Neighborhood Association, Garcia investigated into the background of Tesoro Corporation, the leading company in the project. She discovered that it owed $10 million in air pollution fines and $720,000 for safety violations. She rallied support from unions and business associations in the area who were also worried about the potential health hazards. She became their spokesman, expressing their concerns at meetings and campaigning against the project.

Garcia succeeded in encouraging Vancouver City Council to file an appeal against the proposal to Washington State's Energy Facility Evaluation Council (EFSEC). Despite serious illness, she attended all their meetings from 2014 to 2017, representing the interests of Fruit Valley residents. In November 2017, thanks to her involvement, EFSEC unanimously recommended the state should refuse to grant a permit for the oil terminal, citing risks to "life, safety, property and the environment". In January 2018, Governor Inslee's followed up on the vote, denying permits for the project. As a result, Tesoro Savage and the port terminated the company's lease, effectively cancelling all further plans for the terminal.

In April 2019, Garcia was awarded the Goldman Environmental Prize for preventing the development of North America's largest oil terminal and safeguarding the safety and well-being of her community.
