= Olya Melen =

Ukrainian attorney and environmental activist

- Occupation: Attorney
- Awards: Goldman Environmental Prize (2006)

Olya Melen is a Ukrainian attorney and environmental activist. She was awarded the Goldman Environmental Prize in 2006 for her use of legal channels to halt the construction of the Danube-Black Sea Canal. The Danube Delta at the coast of the Black Sea was designated as a "Wetland of International Importance" under the Ramsar Convention and as a "UNESCO World Heritage Site and Biosphere Reserve".
