= Jesús León Santos =

Mexican environmentalist

- Known for: Grassroots environmentalism
- Children: 3
- Father: 2
- Relatives: 1
- Awards: Goldman Environmental Prize (2008)

Jesús León Santos is a Mexican environmentalist. He was awarded the Goldman Environmental Prize in 2008, for his efforts on a sustainable development of agriculture in the Mixtec region of the state of Oaxaca.
