= Edwin Bustillos =

Mexican human rights activist (1964–2003)

- Born: May 16, 1964
- Died: February 21, 2003 (aged 38)
- Citizenship: Mexican
- Occupation: Agricultural engineer
- Awards: Goldman Environmental Prize (1996)

Edwin Bustillos García (May 16, 1964 – February 21, 2003) was a Mexican human rights activist, environmentalist, and agricultural engineer from the Sierra Madre in Mexico. He was partially of Tarahumara descent.

Bustillos worked for a forestry-development project funded by the World bank. However, while he was involved in that effort, he became more interested in the humanitarian problems of the Sierra Madre, including the drug trafficking issues. He also worked on other illegal activity in the region used to manipulate the natives. In 1992, Bustillos founded the Consejo Asesor Sierra Madre. This organization focuses on conservation and protection of the native's way of life and the environment. This has, at times, been at odds with the drug traffickers in the area, who have been accused of working against the interests of the local population.

Bustillos was awarded the Goldman Environmental Prize in 1996 for his efforts on the preservation of land in the Sierra Madre Occidental. He is also featured in the film Voices of the Sierra Tarahumara.

Bustillos died in 2003 after a long illness.
