= Tarcisio Feitosa da Silva =

Brazilian environmental activist

Tarcísio Feitosa da Silva is a prominent environmental activist from Brazil, where he is director of the Roman Catholic Church's Pastoral Land Commission. Because of his work with local communities deep in the Amazon jungle in their struggle against illegal commercial logging and mining operations, "after the American nun Dorothy Stang was shot to death on a jungle road, he replaced her at the top of the death list that loggers, ranchers, miners and land speculators are known to maintain."

In 2006, Mr. da Silva was a recipient of the Goldman Environmental Prize.
