= Marina Rikhvanova =

Marina Petrovna Rikhvanova is a Russian ecologist and leader of the Baikal Ecological Wave (BEW) organization which protects Siberia's Lake Baikal from ecological damage. Lake Baikal, the world's biggest reservoir of fresh water, is currently under threat from industrial pollution. In 2008, Rikhvanova was awarded the Goldman Environmental Prize.

== History ==
Rikhvanova's concern for the Lake Baikal dates to her years in college, when she wrote a paper on environmental threats posed by a pulp and a paper mill in Baikalsk that had been dumping contaminants into the lake since the 1960s. The mill dumped thousands of tons of pollutants into the lake, including dioxin, which has appeared in Baikal fish and the fat of Baikal seals.

From 1982 to 1990 she worked at the Institute of Biology at ISU, from 1990 to 1993 at the Limnological Institute of the Siberian Branch of the Russian Academy of Sciences.

In 1993, he was the initiator and leader of the Baikal Ecological Wave projects aimed at environmental education, informing, publishing the Volna periodical magazine and sustainable development.

From 2002 to 2006 she was the coordinator of the international public campaign "Baikal is more expensive than oil." As a result, in 2008 she was awarded the Goldman Prize as a representative of Asia for her contribution to the conservation of Lake Baikal. Through the award, she supported 9 projects of social entrepreneurship of Baikalsk residents in 2009, when the Baikal Pulp and Paper Plant was closed for the first time.

When Rikhvanova co-founded a non-governmental organization called Baikal Ecological Wave in 1990, she targeted the mill. Rikhvanova organized demonstrations, petitions and meetings, all aimed at bringing an end to the mill's pollution of Baikal. Last year, Russian authorities ordered the Baikalsk plant to switch to a closed water treatment system that eliminated any wastewater discharge into the lake.

In 2006, Putin decided to reroute an oil pipeline that would have been built within a half-mile of Baikal, near a fault line. This followed protest rallies by thousands of Russians in the streets of Irkutsk.

Rikhvanova has paid a price for her advocacy. Russian police have raided her offices and seized her organization's computers. In 2008, a group of Russian youths attacked a tent camp Rikhvanova had organized to protest a proposed uranium enrichment center in Angarsk, about 50 miles west of Baikal.

From 2008 to 2014, she coordinated projects aimed at the sustainable development of the settlements of Baikalsk, Bolshoy and Maly Goloustnoy.

Since 2014, she has been providing eco-consulting to businesses on implementing environmental principles and improving economic and environmental efficiency, for example, reducing waste management costs.
