= Alok Shukla =

Indian environmental activist

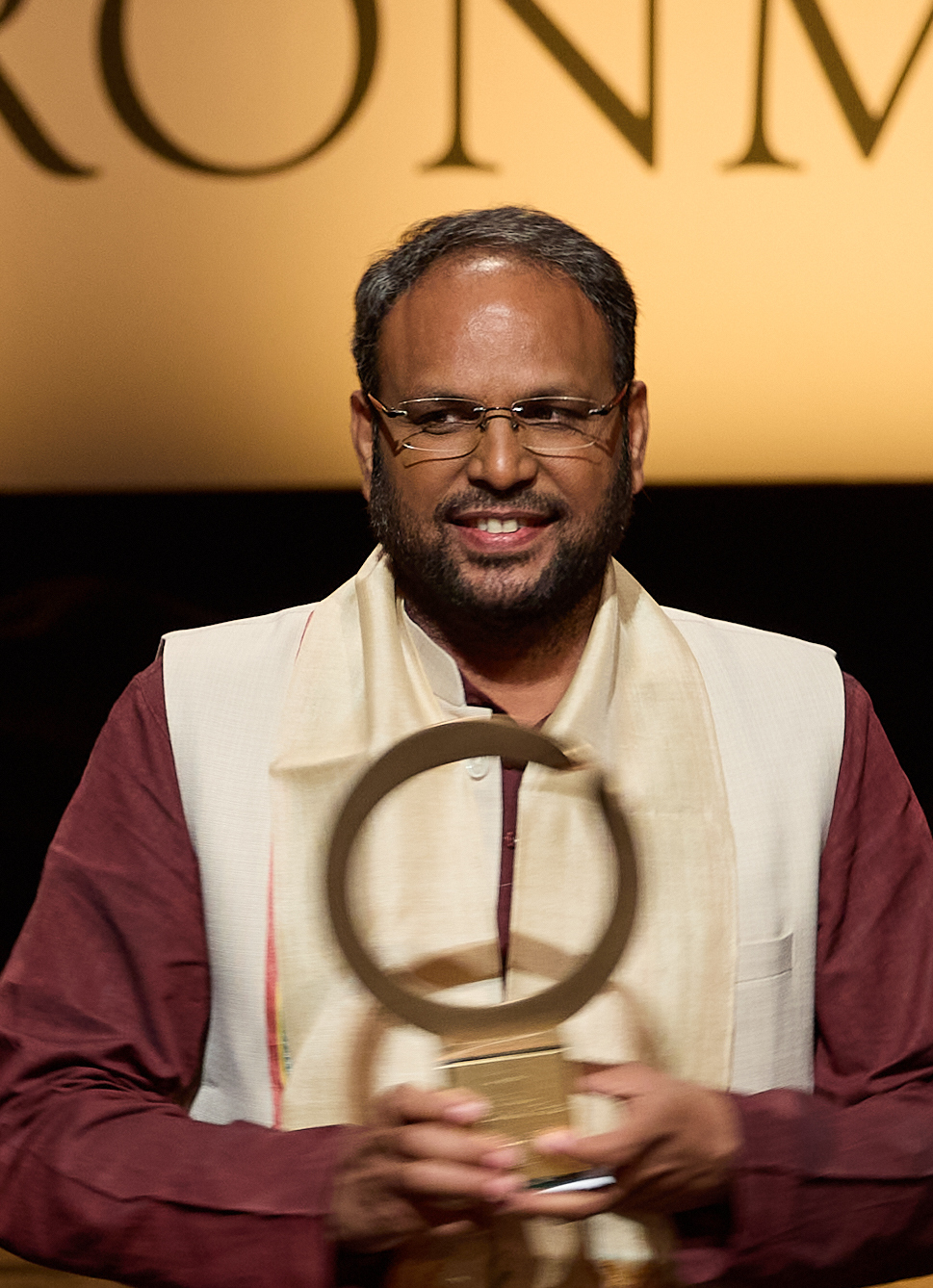
- Born: Chhattisgarh, India
- Occupation: Environmental activist
- Notable work: Campaign to protect Hasdeo Aranya forest Founder of Chhattisgarh Bachao Andolan
- Awards: Goldman Environmental Prize (2024)

Alok Shukla is an Indian environmental activist from Chhattisgarh, he is known for his contributions to forest conservation.

== Early life ==
Shukla was born in 1980, he became active in environmental advocacy after observing the detrimental effects of coal mining on local ecosystems and communities in Chhattisgarh state.

Shukla led a decade-long campaign to protect the Hasdeo Aranya forests, which resulted in the cancellation of 21 proposed coal mines in 2022. This achievement protected approximately 445,000 acres of biodiversity-rich land in the area.

The Goldman Environmental prize was awarded to him for his efforts in 2024, recognizing his commitment to ecological preservation and the rights of local communities.

== Awards ==
- 2024: Goldman Environmental Prize
- 2025: Asian Scientist 100
