= Julio Cusurichi Palacios =

Peruvian environmentalist

- Born: 1971; El Pilar, Madre de Dios
- Citizenship: Peruvian
- Occupations: Peruvian indigenous rights and environmental activist
- Known for: 2007 Goldman Environmental Prize

Julio Cusurichi Palacios is a leading Peruvian environmentalist from the Madre de Dios region of Peru. He was one of the recipients of the 2007 Goldman Environmental Prize.
