= Marcel Gomes =

Brazilian journalist (born 1978 or 1979)

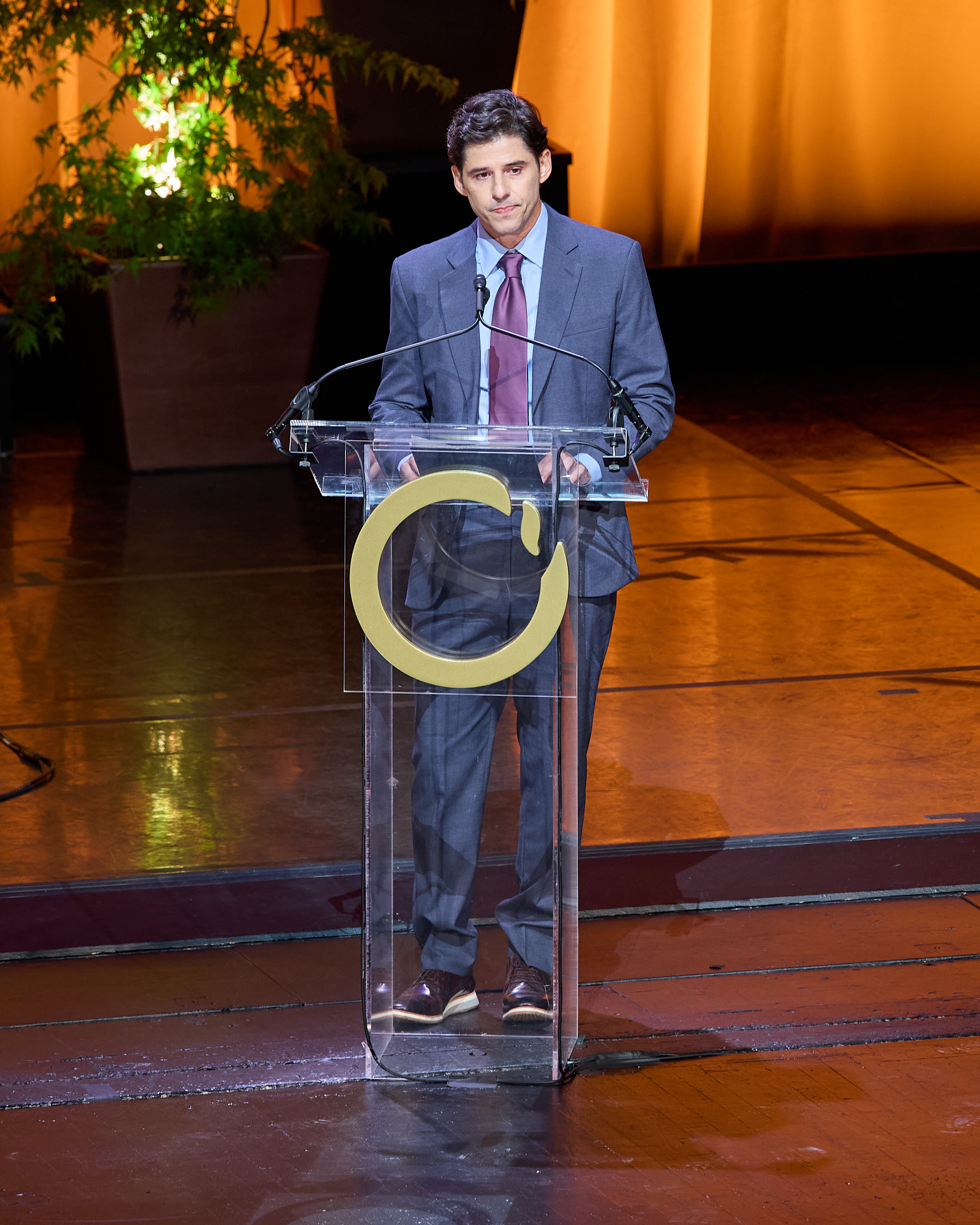
- Marcel Gomes during the award ceremny of the 2024 Goldman Environmental Prize
- Born: 1978 or 1979 (age 46–47); Brazil
- Occupation: Journalist
- Awards: Goldman Environmental Prize (2024)

Marcel Gomes (born 1978 or 1979) is a Brazilian journalist who works as the executive secretary of investigative journalism outlet Repórter Brasil. In 2024, he received the Goldman Environmental Prize for his work in linking deforestation in the Amazon rainforest to the supply chains of meatpacking company JBS S.A., pushing six major European supermarket chains to halt the sale of JBS products.
