= Alberto Curamil =

Mapuche indigenous leader

- Born: c. 1974
- Occupations: Indigenous leader, Mapuche spokesperson
- Awards: Goldman Environmental Prize (2019)

Alberto Curamil (born c. 1974) is a Chilean and Mapuche indigenous leader from the Araucanía Region. He was awarded the Goldman Environmental Prize in 2019, for his efforts to protect the Cautín River from hydroelectric development projects.

In 2018, he was arrested and jailed for 15 months for armed robbery but was later acquitted of all charges and released in December 2019. In April 2021, he sustained injuries after a confrontation with police which led to him being hit with riot shotgun pellets.

He holds the position of lonco, a chief of several communities.
