= Niwat Roykaew =

Environmental activist

- Born: Chiang Kong, Thailand
- Other name: Kru Thi
- Occupation: Environmental activist
- Organization: Chiang Kong Conservation Group
- Awards: 2022 Goldman Environmental Prize

Niwat Roykaew (RTGS: Niwat Roikaeo), also known as "Kru Thi", is a Thai environmental activist known for his efforts to protect the Mekong river from the negative impacts of development projects. He is the founder of the Chiang Kong Conservation Group, a network of 30 Thai villages seeking to address environmental and social issues caused by development along the Mekong.

He is recognized for his efforts to halt the China-led Mekong blasting project, which would have destroyed 248 miles of the river and had significant environmental impacts. Roykaew's work was awarded the 2022 Goldman Environmental Prize.

== Background ==
The Mekong river is a major freshwater resource in Southeast Asia, providing food, drinking water, and irrigation for over 65 million people. It is home to a wide range of biodiversity and is known for its annual flood-drought cycle, which creates essential conditions for major fish migrations. However, the Mekong has faced threats from development projects, particularly dam construction, which can disrupt the natural flow of the river and have negative impacts on the environment and local communities.

One such project was the Lancang-Mekong Navigation Channel Improvement Project, also known as the Mekong blasting project, which proposed blasting 248 miles of the Mekong near the Thai-Laotian border to create a navigable channel for Chinese cargo ships. The project would have had significant environmental impacts, including the destruction of habitats and ecosystems, and potential impacts on the fishing industry and local communities.

== Activities ==
Roykaew, born and raised in Chiang Kong on the banks of the Mekong river, founded the Chiang Kong Conservation Group in 1995. The group is a network of 30 Thai villages seeking to address environmental and social issues caused by development projects along the Mekong.

Upon learning of the Mekong blasting project, Roykaew began to organize against it. He drew on his network of civil society groups, local communities, NGOs, and media in order to gain the attention of the developers and government. He gave interviews and generated extensive media coverage, emphasizing the potential biodiversity loss and ecosystem failure if the project were to continue. He also led boat demonstrations on the Mekong to protest the blasting and met with fishermen in both Thailand and Laos to raise awareness of the potential impacts of the project. He encouraged villagers to sign a petition against the project, which was delivered to the Chinese embassy in Bangkok.

In addition to organizing protests and campaigning for public support, Roykaew also employed citizen science to document the biodiversity in the upper Mekong. He worked with academics and researchers to identify 100 species of fish, including 16 found only in the rapids, and used this information to advocate for the protection of the region. He also voiced his opposition to the project to Thai government ministries and parliamentary committees, highlighting the potential negative impacts on the environment and local communities.

As a result of Roykaew's efforts and the advocacy of the Mekong community, the Mekong blasting project was terminated in February 2020. This marked the first time that the Thai government had canceled a transboundary project due to environmental concerns.

=== Recognition ===
In 2022, Roykaew was awarded the Goldman Environmental Prize, often referred to as the "Green Nobel", in recognition of his efforts to protect the Mekong River and the rights of local communities. He is the first Thai recipient of the prize. Prior to this, in 2021, he was named one of the "Heroes of the Mekong" by the Mekong School, an organization that works to raise awareness of the Mekong River and its importance to the region.
