= Lucie Pinson =

French activist

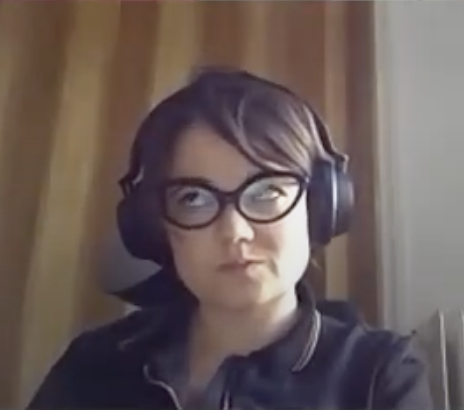
- Pinson in 2021
- Born: 1985; 40 years ago France
- Education: Rhodes University, Sorbonne University
- Occupations: Environmental Activist, Founder
- Organization: Reclaim Finance

Lucie Pinson is a French environmental activist focused on influencing banks, insurance companies, and investors to stop investing in coal projects. She is the founder and director of the NGO Reclaim Finance and a 2020 Goldman Environmental Prize winner.

== Early life and education ==
Growing up in Nantes, it was not until she began schooling in South Africa that she became aware of the environmental and social issues related to coal production. Originally from Sorinières in Loire-Atlantique, Lucie Pinson obtained a degree in history and political science from Rhodes University in South Africa. She obtained a double master's degree in political science and development policy at Sorbonne University in Paris. During her studies, she participated in the organization of G8 and G20 counter-summits.

== Career ==
From 2013 to 2017, Lucie Pinson began her career as a private finance campaign manager for Les Amis de la Terre - France. There, she focused on the coal industry as the largest producer of CO_{2} in the world. Here, she was able to persuade French bankers, insurers, and investors to include some of the first policies to defund a number of coal sub-sectors. Lucie Pinson's strategy confronts the financing for the coal sector. She calls out the banks and their campaigns and asks them to stop their investments in companies extracting coal, for example during general meetings of shareholders by practicing "Name and shame." In 2015, three of the largest French banks (Crédit agricole, Société Générale and BNP Paribas) announced that they wanted to reduce their investments in companies active in coal extraction. By 2020, more than 40 banks and insurance companies stopped supporting the construction of mines and coal-fired power plants.

In 2020, Pinson founded Reclaim Finance, a research and campaigning non-governmental organization that provides data and research to institutions in the financial sectors. In doing so, Reclaim Finance hopes to influences banks, insurers, and investor in making investment choices that will be in the best interest of the planet. By November 2020, Pinson was awarded the Goldman Environmental Prize.

== Selected awards ==
- 2020 - Goldman Environmental Prize
- 2023 - The 100 Most Influential Leaders Driving Business to Real Climate Action from TIME magazine
