= Feliciano dos Santos =

- Occupation: Musician
- Known for: Grassroots environmentalism
- Awards: Goldman Environmental Prize (2008)

Feliciano dos Santos is a Mozambican musician and environmentalist, hailing from the Niassa Province. He was awarded the Goldman Environmental Prize in 2008, for his use of music to promote the need of improving water and sanitation infrastructure in the Niassa region.
