= Choi Yul =

South Korean activist, environmentalist and organizer

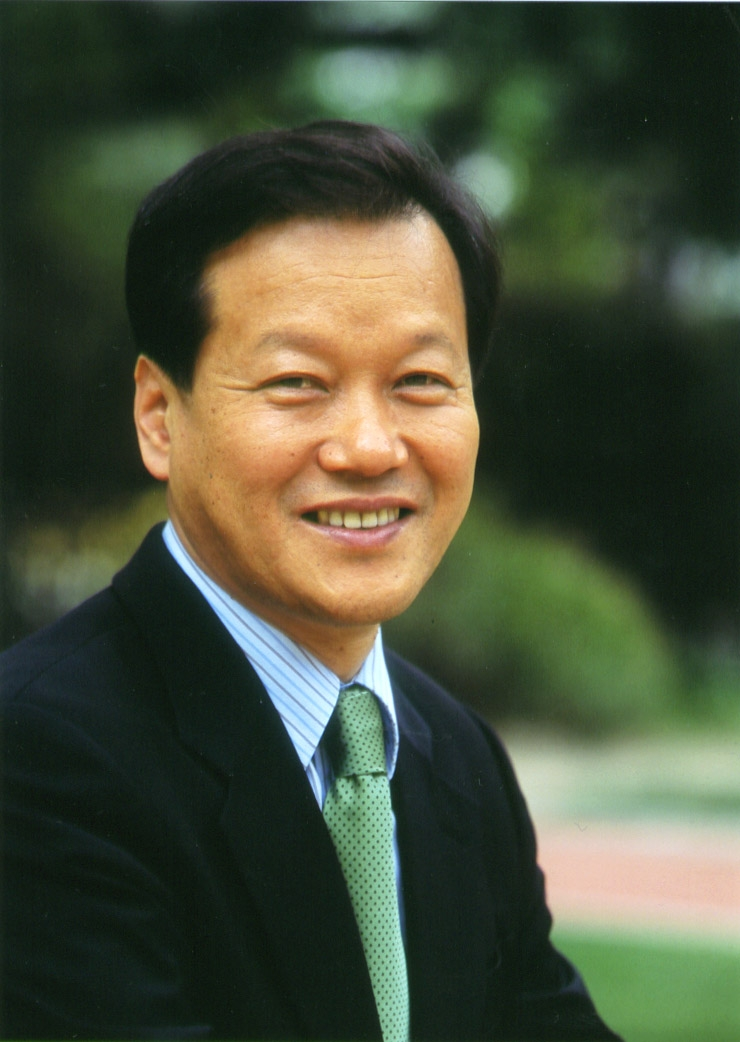

President of Korea Green Foundation

Personal details
- Born: 19 January 1949 (age 77) Daegu, Republic of Korea
- Website: https://web.archive.org/web/20120323133626/http://www.choiyul.com/

Korean name
- Hangul: 최열
- Hanja: 崔冽
- RR: Choe Yeol
- MR: Ch'oe Yŏl

Choi Yul (Korean: 최열) is a South Korean activist, environmentalist and organizer. He chaired the Korean Anti-Pollution Movement from 1988, and led the Korean Federation for Environmental Movement from 1993. He was awarded the Global 500 Roll of Honour in 1994 and the Goldman Environmental Prize in 1995. He is currently a president of the Korea Green Foundation.

== Current Position ==
- President of the Korea Green Foundation
- Co-president of Climate Change Center, Korea Green Foundation
- Festival Director of the Green Film Festival in Seoul
- Co-president of Forestry for Life

== Experience ==
- 2002–2005: Co-president of Korean Federation for Environmental Movement
- 2000: Co-chairman of Citizens Alliance for 2000 General Election
- 1998: Co-president of Forestry for Life Campaign
- 1996–1998: Chairman of the Korean Eco-labeling Association
- 1993–2002: Established the Korean Federation for Environmental Movement, Secretary General
- 1992: Head of Korean Nongovernmental Delegates for Rio Earth Summit
- 1988: Co-chairman of Korea Anti-pollution Movement Association
- 1982–1987 :Chairman of Korean Anti-Pollution Organization

== Honors and Activities ==
- 2010: Cultural Ambassador Prize - Green Planet Movie Awards
- 1999: Worldwatch Magazine's “World’s 15 Civil Activists” Award
- 1997: National Recognition in commemoration of World Environmental Day
- 1995: Goldman Environmental Prize
- 1994: Global 500 Roll of Honour by UNEP
- 1993: Seoul Lawyer Association's “Civil Rights” Award

== Publications ==
- 2010: Study Book of Climate Change
- 2009: My life with Environmental Actions for 33 years ISBN 9788984985889
- 2007: Boomerang Effect of Global Warming / Yul Choi's Stories about Global Warming
- 2002: Global Environmental Story of Yul Choi 1,2
- 1996: Everything which is Living is Beautiful.
- 1994 (1, 2), 1997 (3): Our Environmental Story 1,2,3
- 1988: Multi-Pollution - A novel
- 1986: Pollution Map of Korea
