= Nick Carter (environmentalist) =

Zambian environmentalist

- Died: 2000
- Occupation: Environmentalist
- Awards: Goldman Environmental Prize (1997)

Nick Carter (died 2000) was a Zambian environmentalist.

He was awarded the Goldman Environmental Prize in 1997, for his efforts on documenting pirate whaling and global wildlife crime, and his contributions to organizing activities leading to the Lusaka Agreement between six African countries in September 1994, aiming to enforce regulations such as the Convention on International Trade in Endangered Species.
