= Bruno Van Peteghem =

New Caledonian environmentalist (1950s–2022)

- Born: 1950s New Caledonia
- Died: 24 August 2022
- Known for: Grassroots environmentalism
- Awards: Goldman Environmental Prize (2001)

Bruno Van Peteghem (1950s – 24 August 2022, in New Caledonia) was awarded the Goldman Environmental Prize in 2001, for his campaign to place the island's coral reef (among the world's largest and most unusual) on UNESCO's World Heritage List in order to protect the reef against destruction from nickel mining industries.
