= Anna Giordano =

Italian conservationist

Anna Giordano (born in 1965) is an Italian conservationist. A trained ornithologist with a doctorate in natural sciences, Giordano is today a leader of World Wide Fund for Nature (WWF) in Sicily and a respected environmentalist across Europe, and she won the Goldman Prize in 1998. She's known because of her work for the protection of wild birds and against the damages that the bridge over the Strait of Messina would cause in the environment.

== Biography ==
She joined the Italian League for Bird Protection (LIPU) at the age of six. In 1981, after seeing 17 birds shot out of the sky by poachers shooting from cement bunkers, she committed herself to the fight against poachers. Challenging men in the Sicilian male-dominated society where there was a long tradition of hunting migrating raptors, created open hostility toward Giordano. When she began badgering police, forest rangers and local authorities to do something about the illegal killing, she was not taken seriously. But she persisted and, in 1984, began organizing camps of young people from all throughout the world who would gather each spring to observe the migrations and inform police when they saw poachers at work.

The hunters retaliated with threats and intimidation. In 1986 she narrowly escaped the firebombing of her car, and later poachers broke into her house and mailed her a dead falcon with a threatening note. After this and another incident where she and a group of young people monitoring the migration were shot at, local law enforcement officers began to aid Giordano in her efforts to stop rampant poaching.

She declared that in 1984, during the first camp, they counted about 3,100 raptors and storks, and 1,100 shots — and in 2000, just a little bit less than 35,000 raptors and storks, and 5 shots.

Between 1996 and 2003, Anna Giordano was the Director of the Natural Reserve Saline di Trapani and Paceco, established by the Sicilian Region and managed by WWF.

Nowadays, Giordano leads the WWF team involved with the review of environmental impact assessments for development proposals in the European Union and Italy. Between 2007 and 2008, she was involved with the Environmental Impact Assessment and Strategic Environmental Assessment established by the Italian Ministry for the Environment. In 2021 she has won the environmental Italian prize "Luisa Minazzi - Ambientalista dell'anno".
