= Ricardo Navarro =

Salvadorian engineer

- Occupation: Engineer
- Awards: Goldman Environmental Prize (1995)

Ricardo Navarro is an engineer from El Salvador. He was founder and president of the environmental organization CESTA (Salvadoran Center for Appropriate Technology). He received the Goldman Environmental Prize in 1995, for his contributions to sustainable development.
