= Jonathan Deal =

South African environmentalist

- Born: 1958 or 1959
- Occupation: Environmentalist
- Known for: Grassroots environmentalism
- Awards: Goldman Environmental Prize (2013)

Jonathan Deal is a South African environmentalist. He was awarded the Goldman Environmental Prize in 2013, in particular for his efforts on protecting the Karoo region, leading a team of scientists to bring forward environmental impacts of planned exploitation of possible shale gas in the region. Jonathan Deal established Treasure Karoo Action Group in 2011 and continues to hold the position of CEO. He gained experience in a nationwide movement opposing Royal Dutch Shell and the Department of Mineral Resources (2010–present) aimed at thwarting shale gas mining (fracking) in South Africa. He has also played a crucial role in the formation of SAFE CITIZEN, a civil liberties organization that focuses on the security of South African citizens who are confronted with mounting and vicious criminal activities on a daily basis.

== Career ==
South African environmentalist Jonathan Deal. His work defending the Karoo region and gathering a team of experts to present the environmental effects of planned mining of potential shale gas in the area earned him the 2013 Goldman Environmental Prize.
