= Randall Arauz =

Costa Rican environmentalist

- Occupation: Biologist
- Awards: Goldman Environmental Prize (2010)

Randall Arauz (born c. 1961) is an environmentalist working in Costa Rica. He was awarded the Goldman Environmental Prize in 2010 for his efforts on the protection of the sharks and banning of the shark finning industry. Arauz was awarded The Gothenburg Award for Sustainable Development for 2010, shared with Ken Sherman.
