= Manny Calonzo =

Filipino environmentalist

Manny Calonzo is an environmental advocate. Aided by the Ecological Waste Coalition of the Philippines (EcoWaste) – in which he served as their former president and advisor – he was responsible for the Philippine government’s law to nationally ban lead paint (culminating in 85% lead-certified paint there since 2017) and the creation of a third-party certification program for paint manufacturers. His anti-toxic campaign extended to other substances in footwear items which potentially decreased fertility in men and harmed fetuses. In 2018 he was one of seven international Goldman Environmental Prize winners – a decade after he began his national campaign – which resulted in the protection of millions of Filipino children. Calonzo is a consultant on the Global Lead Paint Elimination Campaign at the International Persistent Organic Pollutants Elimination Network.
