= Pisit Charnsnoh =

Thai environmentalist

- Known for: Grassroots environmentalism
- Awards: Goldman Environmental Prize (2002)

Pisit Charnsnoh, from Trang Province, Thailand, cofounded the Yadfon Association in 1985. He was awarded the Goldman Environmental Prize in 2002, for his efforts on protecting the coastal ecosystems of Thailand. Charnsnoh is on the board of the international Seattle-based Mangrove Action Project, and is affiliated with the Industrial Shrimp Action Network.
