= Libia Grueso =

Colombian social worker and civil rights activist

- Occupation: Social worker
- Known for: Civil rights activism
- Awards: Goldman Environmental Prize (2004)

Libia Grueso is a social worker and civil rights activist from Buenaventura, Colombia, fighting for civil rights of Afro-Colombian communities.

She is also co-founder of the Process of Black Communities (PCN). She managed to secure more than 24,000 km^{2} in territorial rights for the country's black rural communities, and she has been focused on protecting Colombia's Pacific rainforest. Libia Grueso received the Goldman Environmental Prize in 2004.
