= Christine Jean =

French biologist and activist

- Born: 1957 (age 68–69); Nantes, France
- Occupation: biologist
- Awards: Goldman Environmental Prize

Christine Jean (born 1957 in Nantes) is a French biologist and environmental activist. She was dubbed "Madame Loire" by the French press.

She was awarded the Goldman Environmental Prize in 1992 for her efforts on preserving the river Loire, the longest river in France, from dam constructions.

== Education ==
Christine Jean was trained in agronomy at École nationale supérieure d'agronomie et des industries alimentaires and holds a master's degree in ecology in the domain of hydrology from Paul Verlaine University – Metz.

== SOS Loire Vivante ==
Christine Jean coordinated a nationwide campaign to prevent the damming of the Loire. This was very important as the Loire is one of the last wild rivers with great ecological wealth. The dam project was supported by parts of the building industry who wanted to make a profit. Furthermore, it should have been used for using the water for cooling four reactors that were supposed to be built along the river. The activism started when Jean, with the help of the World Wildlife Fund, united several small initiatives along the Loire river to a nationwide organization called SOS Loire Vivante. Unified they could provide a strong opposition to the dam project. With funding of the WWF France, WWF Germany and WWF International they inaugurated a program to educate the public, engage media, sponsor conferences, stage demonstrations and ultimately file a legal suit against the dam- building consortium. After a long sustained opposition campaign they reached a victory when the French government announced that it would discard the Serre de la Fare dam construction and instead adopt an alternative river management program. The alternative program included tightening controls on urbanization in flood risk areas. Furthermore, two hydroelectric installations were demolished to make it more possible for migratory fish like salmon to reach their spawning grounds.

== Activism ==
After her successful campaign against the dam project she continued her activism. She did for example fight against the enlargement of Nantes - St.- Nazaire port at the Loire rivers mouth that were supposed to accommodate a nuclear power plant.

== Honours ==
- Goldman Environmental Prize in 1992
- Named as one of the heroes of the planet by Time in 1999
