= Rousseau (surname) =

Rousseau is a French surname. Notable people with the surname include:

== Arts and entertainment ==
=== Artists ===
- Henri Rousseau (1844–1910), French naive painter, also known as Douanier Rousseau
- Jacques Rousseau (painter) (1630–1693), French painter
- Jeanne Rij-Rousseau (1870–1956), French painter and art theorist
- Jean Simeon Rousseau de la Rottière (1747–1820), French decorative painter
- Philippe Rousseau (1816–1887), French still life painter
- Samuel Rousseau (artist) (born 1971), French artist
- Théodore Rousseau (1812–1867), French painter

=== Writers and poets ===
- Jean-Baptiste Rousseau (1671–1741), French poet
- Jean-Jacques Rousseau (1712–1778), Genevan author and philosopher
- Nita Rousseau (1949–2003), French writer

=== Architects ===
- Charles M. Rousseau (1848–1918), Belgium-born American architect
- Oliver Rousseau (1891–1977), American architect, real estate developer, and builder

=== Musicians and composers ===
- Eugene Rousseau (saxophonist) (1932–2024), American saxophonist
- Frederick Rousseau (born 1958), French musician
- Jean Rousseau (violist) (1644–1699), French musician and author
- Samuel Rousseau (composer) (1853-1904), French composer

=== Actors and directors ===
- Jean-Jacques Rousseau (director) (1946-2014), Belgian film director
- Serge Rousseau (1930–2007), French film and television actor
- Stéphane Rousseau (born 1966), Canadian actor

== Military ==
- Jeannie Rousseau (1919-2017), French Resistance fighter and spy
- Lawrence Rousseau (1790–1866), United States Navy and Confederate States Navy officer
- Lovell Rousseau (1818–1869), American general

== Politics and government ==
- André Rousseau (1911–2002), Quebec politician and businessman
- Roger Rousseau (1921–1986), Canadian ambassador

== Science ==
- Cecil C. Rousseau (1938–2020), American mathematician
- Denis Rousseau, American scientist
- Frederic Rousseau, Belgian molecular biologist
- Judith Rousseau, French statistician

== Sports ==
- Alex Rousseau (water polo) (born 1967), American water polo player
- Bobby Rousseau (1940–2025), Canadian ice hockey player
- Eugène Rousseau (chess player) (1805–1877), French chess player
- Florian Rousseau (born 1974), French cyclist
- Gregory Rousseau (born 2000), American football player
- Jacques Rousseau (athlete) (1951–2024), French track and field athlete
- Maurice Rousseau (1906–1977), French Olympic gymnast
- Michel Rousseau (disambiguation), multiple people
- Odette Rousseau (1927–2012), French parachutist
- Vincent Rousseau (born 1962), Belgian runner
- Yves Rousseau, French aviator

== Other fields ==
- Domaine Armand Rousseau, wine producer in Burgundy, France
- Isaac Rousseau (1672–1747), Genevan master clockmaker and Jean-Jacques Rousseau's father
- Michael Rousseau (born 1958), Canadian businessman
- Philip Rousseau, scholar of early Christianity
- Samuel Rousseau (orientalist) (1763–1820), British printer and Orientalist scholar
- Thomas Rousseau, Founder of American Neofascist group Patriot Front.

== Fictional characters ==
- Alexandra Rousseau, daughter of Danielle Rousseau on the American TV show Lost
- Danielle Rousseau, a recurring character on Lost

== See also ==
- Rossouw, an Afrikaans surname derived from the French surname
