= Briefly.co.za =

South African news website

- Type: News Website
- Industry: Digital media and news
- Founded: 2014
- Headquarters: South Africa
- Area served: South Africa
- Key people: Rianette Cluley (Managing director); Maryn Blignaut, Head of Desk (Human Interest); Sibusisiwe Lwandle, Head of Desk (Entertainment)
- Number of employees: 20+
- Parent: Legit (formerly GMEM)
- Website: briefly.co.za

Briefly.co.za (or Briefly News) is a South African news website. The news publisher is a part of Legit (formerly GMEM), a digital media holding operating in South Africa, Nigeria, Kenya, Ghana, and worldwide.

Other Briefly News sister websites are Legit.ng, TUKO.co.ke, YEN.com.gh and Sportsbrief.com

== History ==
In December 2014, Briefly News was founded by Legit (ex-GMEM), a global media holding that operates in Nigeria (Legit.ng), Kenya (TUKO.co.ke), Ghana (YEN.com.gh), and worldwide (Sportsbrief.com). At the same time, Briefly News App was released for Android users.

In March 2021, Briefly News became a UN Sustainable Development Goals Media Compact Member for coverage of life-changing human-interest stories alongside Corporate Social Responsibility (CSR) programs.

In July, Facebook published a case study about Briefly News' use of Instant Articles to boost traffic, interactions, and revenue. In the article, the news brand, along with sister projects TUKO.co.ke, Legit.ng, and YEN.com.gh are named among the top-earning brands on the Facebook platform in the MENA region.

In January 2022, Briefly News launched new content directions covering news on Women Empowerment and Cars & Tech.

In February 2022, according to Datareportal's Digital Report 2022, Briefly News was recognized as one of the most-visited websites in South Africa based on total monthly traffic.

In December, Briefly News launched a Women of Wonder special project writing about a group of 21 women who reached great heights in politics, business, the public sector, culture, among them were Nonkululeko Gobodo, Melene Rossouw, Makoma Lekalakala, Apiwe Nxusani-Mawela, Mamokgethi Phakeng, Makhadzi, and Ami Faku.

In the same year, Lebogang Mashego, Briefly News current affairs desk manager, received Elevate Scholarships by INMA, Google News Initiative.

Since 2022, Briefly News signed a partnership with AFP, which regularly provides up-to-date news pieces to Briefly News.

In March 2023, Briefly News partnered with Meta to highlight the impact of digital communities in solving problems in Africa through the "I Am Because We Are" campaign.

In June 2023, Briefly News joined the International News Media Association (INMA).

In August, the firm was honored with the African Excellence Award and acclaimed as the Global News Platform of the Year for 2023.
