= Charles Rousseau =

Charles Rousseau may refer to:

- Charles Rousseau (born 1923), winemaker at Domaine Armand Rousseau
- Charles Rousseau (1862–1916), Belgian painter
- Charles F. Rousseau (1908–1976), Luxembourg philatelist
- Charles M. Rousseau (1848–1918), Belgian-born American architect
