= Presidential Climate Commission (South Africa) =

Climate Commission of South Africa

The Presidential Climate Commission is a South African statutory body composed of government ministers and other social stakeholders appointed in December 2020 by President Cyril Ramaphosa to oversee South Africa's response to climate change. It is established to monitor and review the country's progress in reducing emissions - shifting from burning fossil fuels and adapting to forms of green energy without leading to job losses as part of the just transition programme.

== Overview ==
South Africa ranks number 14 on the global list of countries that have the largest carbon emitters because of its reliance on coal as a source of electrical energy. Recently, electricity generator Eskom said a total of 213.2 tons of carbon dioxide were emitted just in the year 2020 alone. President Cyril Ramaphosa formed the Presidential Climate Commission in September 2020 and its over 40 members - who are representatives from government departments, state entities, business organisations, labour, academia, civil society, research institutions and traditional leadership - were appointed in December 2020 and recruitment of members were ongoing. The decision to establish South Africa's climate change commission was a resolution taken at the Presidential Health Summit held on 19 and 20 October 2018 in Boksburg, Gauteng. The commission is tasked with overseeing a just transition to a low-carbon. The commission meets quarterly to have its ad hoc groups giving reports to Ramaphosa on progress. South Africa aims to align itself with the Paris Agreement on climate change by moving away from carbon footprint to using cleaner energy sources.

== Members ==
The chairperson of the commission is president Cyril Ramaphosa and its deputy chairperson is Valli Moosa. Its members are from the departments of the South African government, state entities, business organisations, labour, academia, civil society, research institutions and traditional leadership. The full list of members is below:

- Valli Moosa (Deputy Chair)
- Barbara Creecy
- Maropene Ramokgopa
- Enoch Godongwana
- Mmamoloko Kubayi
- Pravin Gordhan
- Gwede Mantashe
- Thembi Nkadimeng
- Ebrahim Patel
- Blade Nzimande
- Sindisiwe Chikunga
- Senzo Mchunu
- Thoko Didiza
- Kgosientsho Ramokgopa
- Kenalemang R Phukuntsi
- Alderman Geordin Hill-Lewis
- Mac Chavalala
- Bobby Peek
- Makoma Lekalakala
- Nikisi Lesufi
- Shafick Adams
- Ayakha Melithafa
- Brian Mantlana
- Mandy Rambharos
- Joanne Bate
- Dhesigen Naidoo
- Mapaseka Lukhele
- Shamini Harrington
- Princess Tsakani Nkambule
- Setlakalane Molepo
- Joanne Yawitch
- Mbulaheni Mbodi
- Lebogang Mulaisi
- Jacques Hugo
- Mac Chavalala
- Bongani Mwale
- Louise Naude
- Bobby Peek
- Happy Khambule
- Bantu Holomisa
- Melissa Fourie
- Janse Rabie
- Zama Khanyile
- Mpho Makwana
- Mbali Baduza
- Malusi Mpumlwana
- Lungisa Fuzile
- Crispian Olver

== See also ==
- Renewable energy in South Africa
- Just transition
- Green energy
