= Rossouw =

Rossouw is an Afrikaans surname, derived from the French Rousseau. It may refer to:

- Botha Rossouw (1969–2023), South African rugby union footballer
- Chris Rossouw (rugby union, born 1969), South African rugby union player
- Chris Rossouw (rugby union, born 1976), South African rugby union player
- Cobus Rossouw (born 1933), South African actor
- Daantjie Rossouw (1930–2010), South African rugby union player
- Danie Rossouw (born 1978), South African rugby player
- Danie Rossouw (cricketer) (born 1995), South African cricketer
- Daniel Rossouw (born 1970), South African cricketer
- Divan Rossouw (born 1996), Namibian rugby union player
- Johannes Rossouw (born 1964), South African wrestler
- Jacques Rossouw, South African doctor
- Laura Rossouw (born 1946), South African tennis player
- Mandy Rossouw (died 2013), South African journalist, political analyst and author
- Melene Rossouw, Nigerian South African lawyer
- Neil Rossouw (born 1976), Namibian cricketer
- P. D. Rossouw (1845–1896), South African priest and literary figure
- Pieter Rossouw (cricketer) (born 1980), Namibian cricketer
- Pieter Rossouw (rugby union) (born 1971), South African rugby union player
- Rilee Rossouw (born 1989), South African cricketer
