= Theresa Meikle =

American judge (1893–1967)

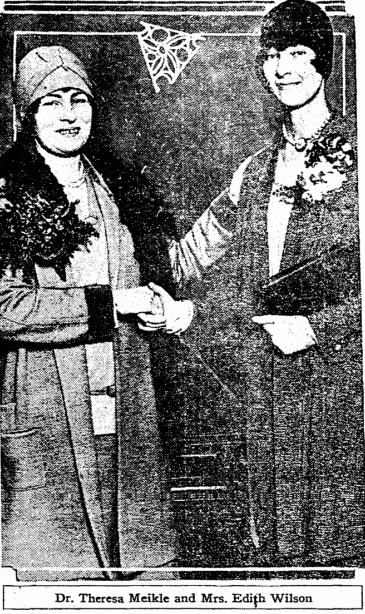
Theresa Meikle and Edith Wilson

Theresa Meikle (August 4, 1893 – August 7, 1967) was an American judge of the San Francisco County Superior Court. In 1955, she was elected to the post of presiding judge of that court and became the first woman elected to such a position in any major American city.

== Early life ==
Meikle was born on August 4, 1893, in Globe, Arizona, the daughter of James Fraser Meikle (1862–1938) and Mary Green. She had one sister, Felicia Carson (1904–1994).

She attended University of California, Hastings College of the Law where she was a member of Kappa Beta Phi, a legal honor sorority.

== Career ==
In 1923, Meikle was appointed Assistant District Attorney of San Francisco and Attorney for the State Board of Pharmacy by Governor C. C. Young in November 1927 where she served with the state narcotics division.

She was a member the To Kolan Women's Club.

In 1931, Meikle was appointed by the California governor to preside over the San Francisco Women's Court as judge, the first time a San Francisco criminal court had a female judge. Notably, Meikle succeeded Mary Wetmore, who died only one week into her judicial service for the San Francisco Municipal Court. The San Francisco Women's Court was established in 1916 to provide social justice for women. Women worked in the court as lawyers, assistant district attorneys and, with Meikle, judges. In 1942 Judge Clarence Morris removed Meikle and appointed himself to take her place. The Women's Court was abolished in 1956 for economic reasons.

In 1942, she was elected to the San Francisco County Superior Court, beating incumbent Everett McKeage by a margin of 1.5 to 1 and becoming the first woman to serve on the court. In April 1955, she was elected presiding judge of the Court, the first female judge to hold such a position in any major city in the United States. Meikle retired in 1960 after 17 years on the Superior Court's bench.

== Personal life ==
Meikle previously lived in Ashland, Oregon before moving to California in 1911. She died on August 7, 1967, and is buried at the Holy Cross Cemetery in Colma, California.
