= Michel Rousseau =

Michel Rousseau is the name of:

- Michel Rousseau (cyclist) (1936–2016), French cyclist
- Michel Rousseau (swimmer) (born 1949), French former swimmer

== See also ==
- Rousseau (surname)
