= Legit.ng =

Nigerian digital news platform

- Website type: News, entertainment, politics
- Available in: English, Hausa
- Founded: 2012; 14 years ago
- Headquarters: Lagos, Nigeria
- Area served: Nigeria
- Employees: 60
- Website: www.legit.ng
- Registration: None
- Launched: 2012
- Current status: Active
- Written in: HTML, CSS, JavaScript

Legit.ng (formerly Naij.com), also known as Legit News, is a Nigerian digital media and news platform run by Naij.com Media Limited, part of Legit (ex-GMEM).

It was ranked as the #1 news and entertainment platform and the seventh overall most visited website in Nigeria by Alexa Internet in 2018. Legit.ng is the biggest publisher on Facebook by the audience in the 'Media' category.

== History ==
Founded in 2012, Legit.ng has its headquarters in Ikeja, Lagos, Nigeria and launched an editorial hub in the country's capital, Abuja, in May 2015. Legit.ng is a partner of Legit (ex-GMEM), a global media holding, which also cooperates with Tuko.co.ke (in Kenya), Yen.com.gh (in Ghana), Briefly News (in South Africa) and Sports Brief (worldwide).

In May 2014, Legit.ng released an Android mobile app. It soon became #1 in its category in Nigeria and was featured by Google Play Market. The app hit 500,000 installations in 10 months. The all-time number of installs is more than 5 million.

In June 2015, Legit.ng partnered with Opera Software and telecom giant MTN Group to bring "one million days of free Internet to Nigeria".

The website's servers were attacked by hackers in July 2015.

In August 2015, a news section in the Hausa language was launched.

In February 2016, Legit.ng was among the first in Nigeria to roll out Facebook's instant articles. In 2017, Facebook did a case study of this launch with Legit.ng and published the story in the Facebook Audience Network.

In March 2017, Legit.ng started a local journalism project to connect the reporters representing all the 36 states and the FCT. In the same period, a missing person initiative was launched, to help Nigerians find their loved ones and return them home.

In October 2018, Naij.com changed its name to Legit.ng.

In February 2019, Legit.ng was among 87 media organizations selected across 28 countries to receive Google News Initiative funds.

In August 2019, Legit.ng received the Award for Migration Reporting from UNESCO for migration news stories.

In July 2019, Legit.ng was recognized by Suncity News as one of "Nigeria's Champions of Democracy and Development 2019". The recognition was held at the Suncity Champion of Democracy and Development Awards in Abuja.

A new desk, human interest, was launched to tell more stories about outstanding Nigerians both at home and in the diaspora in February 2020. In March 2020, Legit.ng became a United Nations SDG Media Compact member.

In October 2020, Legit.ng organized the Big Naija Independence Contest. This marked the 60th anniversary of Nigeria's independence. The contest sought to find talented students who were passionate about journalism and writing, while giving them the opportunity to tell their own stories related to the country's independence.

In February 2021, Legit.ng started a Patreon charity program. Since then, the digital news media has collected money for six help campaigns. In July 2021, Legit.ng won a Google News Initiative grant for implementing a recommendation system (ReCo) that improves user experience.

In July 2021, Legit.ng was named the Best News Website in Africa at the 2021 WAN-IFRA Africa Digital Media Awards. The same month, Facebook features Legit.ng as a case study as an African news and entertainment brand.

In June 2022, Legit.ng launched the first gender-based violence (GBV) sensitization and fundraising campaign in partnership with Nigeria's leading NGO - WARIF.

In October 2022, Legit.ng became the number one Facebook news media publisher in the world, according to NewsWhip Ranking.

In November 2022, a Legit.ng news media literacy campaign was launched in collaboration with top Nigerian celebrities, including Aproko Doctor, Teminikan, Tochi Oke, Tega Dominic, Chizzy Alichi, and Kayvee.

In April 2023, the Legit.ng website won in the category 'Best Trust Initiative at the Digital Media Awards Africa 2023 for its media literacy campaign.

In June 2023, Legit.ng was recognized as one of the most popular online news publishers by weekly online reach in Nigeria, in the Digital News Report 2023 published by the Reuters Institute of Journalism.

In the same month, Legit.ng became a member of the International News Media Association (INMA) alongside the New York Times and Washington Post.

In July 2023, Legit.ng was recognized as the world's most trusted project at WAN-IFRA Digital Media Awards Worldwide for its media literacy campaign.

In August 2023, Legit.ng collaborated with LEAP Africa to promote media literacy as a tool for social change to round off the Youth Day of Service agenda for 2023.

In October 2023, Legit.ng won Best Online News Medium of the Year at the Nigeria Media Nite-out Award 2023. The HOD of the Current Affairs and Politics Desk, Legit.ng, Nurudeen Lawal, was named 'Political Desk Head of the Year'.

In November 2023, Legit.ng was included in a report by Squirrel Media Technologies for Q3, 2023, where it was ranked among the most visited of Nigeria's platforms.

In December 2023, Legit.ng partnered with the organizers of the United Nations Global Goals Women World Cup (GGWCUP) Nigeria Edition. Legit.ng moderated one of the panel discussions at the event.

== Popularity ==
As of July 2015, it had more than 13 million monthly readers. It was then ranked as the 7th overall most visited website in Nigeria and the first among publishers by Alexa. The website's Facebook page has over 7.5 million members. Legit.ng is the biggest publisher on Facebook, in terms of audience, in the 'Media' category.

In October 2018, the number of Legit TV YouTube channel subscribers exceeded 100,000, and the page was verified by the network. It has been ranked among the top 50 YouTube channels in Nigeria by vidooly.com.
