= Ameyaw Debrah =

Ghanaian celebrity blogger

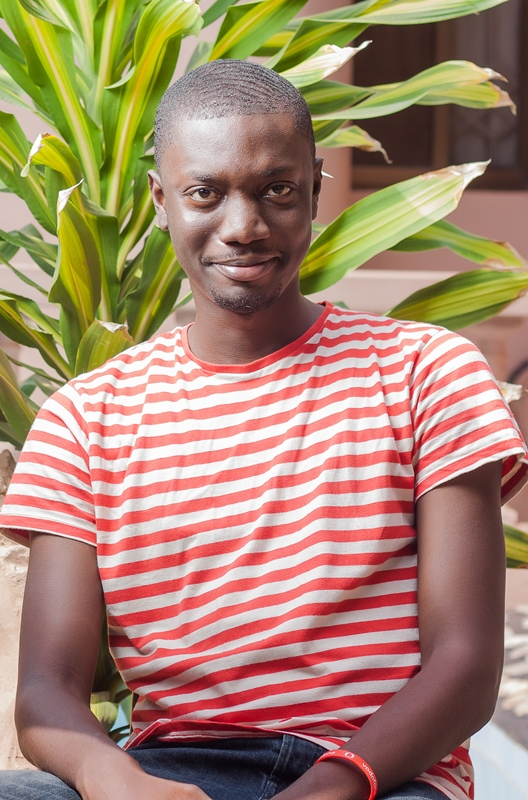
- Born: Ameyaw Kissi Debrah; Accra, Ghana
- Education: Kwame Nkrumah University of Science and Technology; Adisadel College
- Occupations: Blogger; freelance journalist; reporter
- Known for: Celebrity gossip
- Website: ameyawdebrah.com

Ameyaw Kissi Debrah, who is known professionally as Ameyaw Debrah, is a Ghanaian celebrity blogger, freelance journalist, and reporter. He founded AmeyawDebrah.com, an entertainment website and blog that primarily publishes news about Ghanaian celebrities. He graduated from Kwame Nkrumah University of Science and Technology with a bachelor's degree in publishing. While at KNUST, he won the Best Publishing Student award in 2005. He has made significant contributions to several pan-African websites, including Jamati.com, Orijin-ent.com, and ModernGhana.com.

In 2008, he joined GhanaWeb.com as the entertainment editor and launched his own website that same year.

== Early life and education ==
Debrah attended Adisadel College in Cape Coast, and became an editor for the school's magazine in 1999. He graduated with a bachelor's degree in publishing from Kwame Nkrumah University of Science and Technology (KNUST). After graduating from KNUST, Debrah completed his National Service Secretariat (NSS) programme at Ovation International Magazine in Accra.

== Career ==
=== Early career ===
While at Ovation, he primarily wrote about the Ghanaian entertainment industry; his writings were published for the publication's international audience. After completing his NSS, he became a columnist for Star newspaper. In 2007, he devoted his time contributing to the pan-African websites Jamati.com, Orijin-ent.com, and ModernGhana.com.

Towards the end of 2007, he joined Voices of Africa, a media project based in the Netherlands. During his time there, he submitted videos, photos and news from Ghana for Africanews.com. In 2008, he became the entertainment editor for GhanaWeb.com. Later that year, he launched his blog AmeyawDebrah.com and left Ghanaweb in 2012 to pursue his blog full-time. He contributes to StarGist, an entertainment segment on Africa Magic, as a Skype correspondent. He also contributes to content on EbonyLife TV and Glitz Africa Magazine. He was an ambassador for Malta Guinness' Africa Rising Campaign.

=== AmeyawDebrah.com, Ringier Ghana, and YEN News ===
The formulation of AmeyawDebrah.com was a result of Debrah's friend hosting and helping him get the domain. Since its inception, the website has been able to reach readers across the globe. In 2010, the website debuted its iPhone app with the help of MobBase, a web developer. In 2012, the website launched an internet-based talent hunt competition to discover and promote new musical talents in Ghana. In addition, Debrah launched the My Ghana Campaign, a platform that allows readers to record a one-minute video discussing relevant issues in Ghana.

In December 2014, Debrah joined Ringier Ghana to launch and manage Pulse Ghana. He left in August 2015 to join Genesis Technology. In September 2015, Debrah worked as the editor-in-chief of Yen.com.gh, but left the role in September 2017.

=== Managing career ===
Coptic, a Ghanaian music producer, appointed Debrah as his manager in Ghana. Coptic released The Black Star Line Mixtape, Vol 1 (2011), a mixtape that seeks to bring American rappers back to Africa and close to their roots. The Black Star Line Mixtape, Vol 1 serves as Coptic's introduction to the African market. In addition to managing Coptic's interest in Ghana, Debrah is also in charge of scouting for new up-and-coming talents that can be signed to Rebel Musik, Coptic's African music production branch. In an interview posted on Peace FM Online, Debrah said he's grateful for the opportunity to work with Coptic and help advance the careers of other Ghanaian and African artists. Debrah also managed Pappy Kojo in 2014.

== Ameyaw TV ==
In 2018, Debrah launched Ameyaw TV, a web portal that supports various web video formats. After holding auditions for several TV presenters, Ameyaw TV released three shows: Daily Buzz, News in One, and Trend Mill. Later, new programs like Trending GH were added, and more are anticipated to debut in 2019.

== Personal life ==
Debrah married Elsie Darkoa at a wedding ceremony held on March 6, 2018. The couple have a son named Nathan. Debrah also has another son, Samuel Amo-Ameyaw, who represents Southampton FC.

== Awards and nominations ==
Year	Event	Prize	Nominated work	Result	Ref
2005	The Kwame Nkrumah University of Science and Technology Honors	Best Publishing Student	Himself	Won	
2012	GUBA Awards	Best Online Media	AmeyawDebrah.com	Nominated	
2013	City People Entertainment Awards	Best Blogger or Online Reporter (Ghana)	AmeyawDebrah.com	Won	
