= Pedro Altube =

Basque-born American rancher and speculator

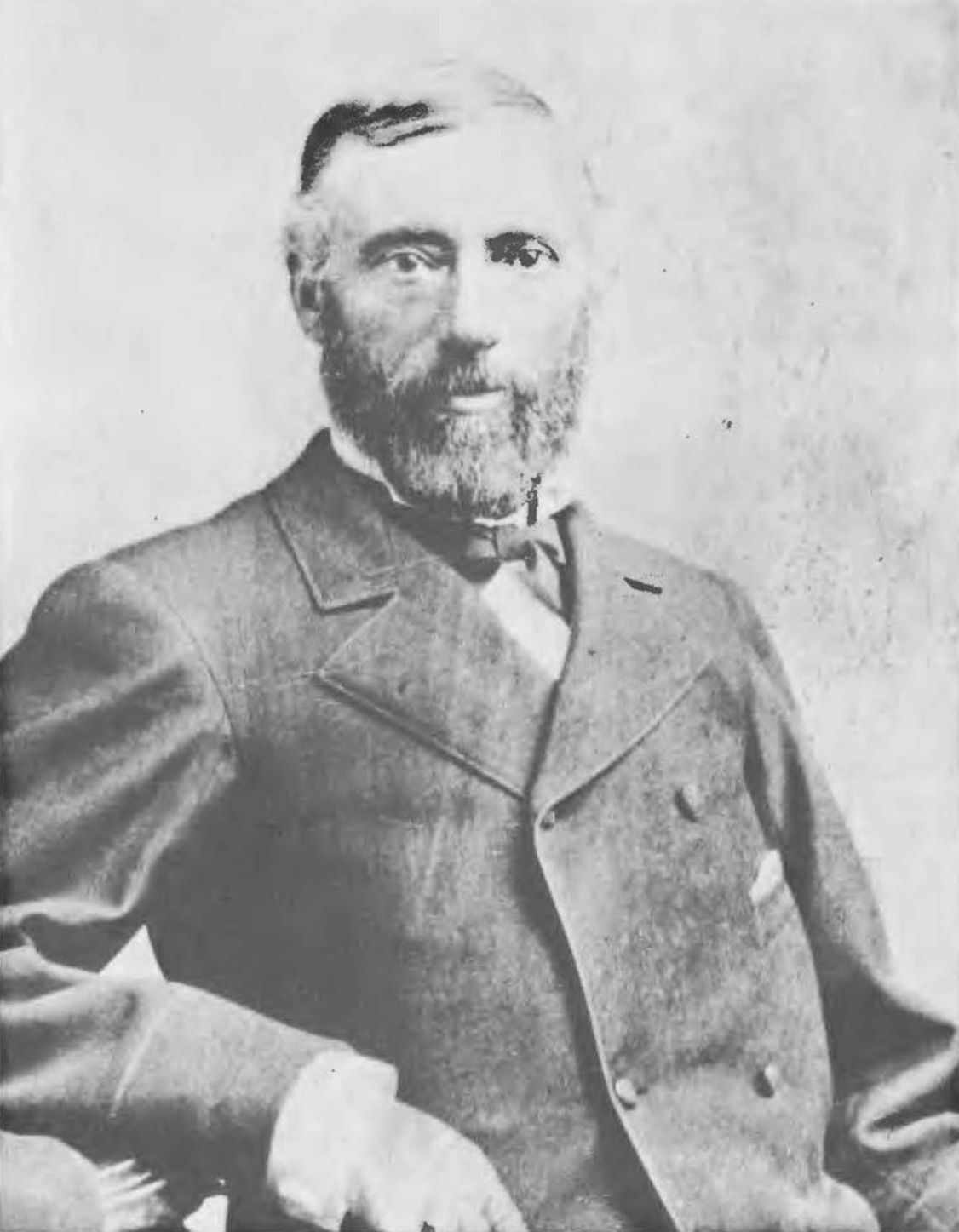
- Born: April 27, 1827; Oñati, Gipuzkoa, Spain
- Died: August 8, 1905 (aged 78); San Francisco, California, United States
- Occupation: Rancher
- Parent(s): Joaquín de Altube Balenzategi, and Micaela Idigoras Eraña

Pedro de Altube Idigoras (April 27, 1827 – August 8, 1905) was a Basque-born American rancher who established, along with his brother Bernardo, the renowned Spanish Ranch in northwestern Nevada. Pedro Altube and his brother Bernardo had emigrated from Spain to Argentina and from there, in 1849, he joined the rush for gold in California, amassing a small fortune not only in the mining camps but in very lucrative cattle and dairy operations. The Altube brothers then established a ranch in northeastern Nevada — the extensive and prosperous Spanish Ranch in Independence Valley, Elko County, near Tuscarora.

Pedro died sudden and unexpectedly of a stroke in 1905, and was interred in the family vault in Holy Cross Cemetery in Colma.

In 1960, he was inducted into the Hall of Great Westerners of the National Cowboy & Western Heritage Museum as the "Father of Basques in America".
