= Portia Arthur =

Ghanaian author, writer and reporter (born 1990)

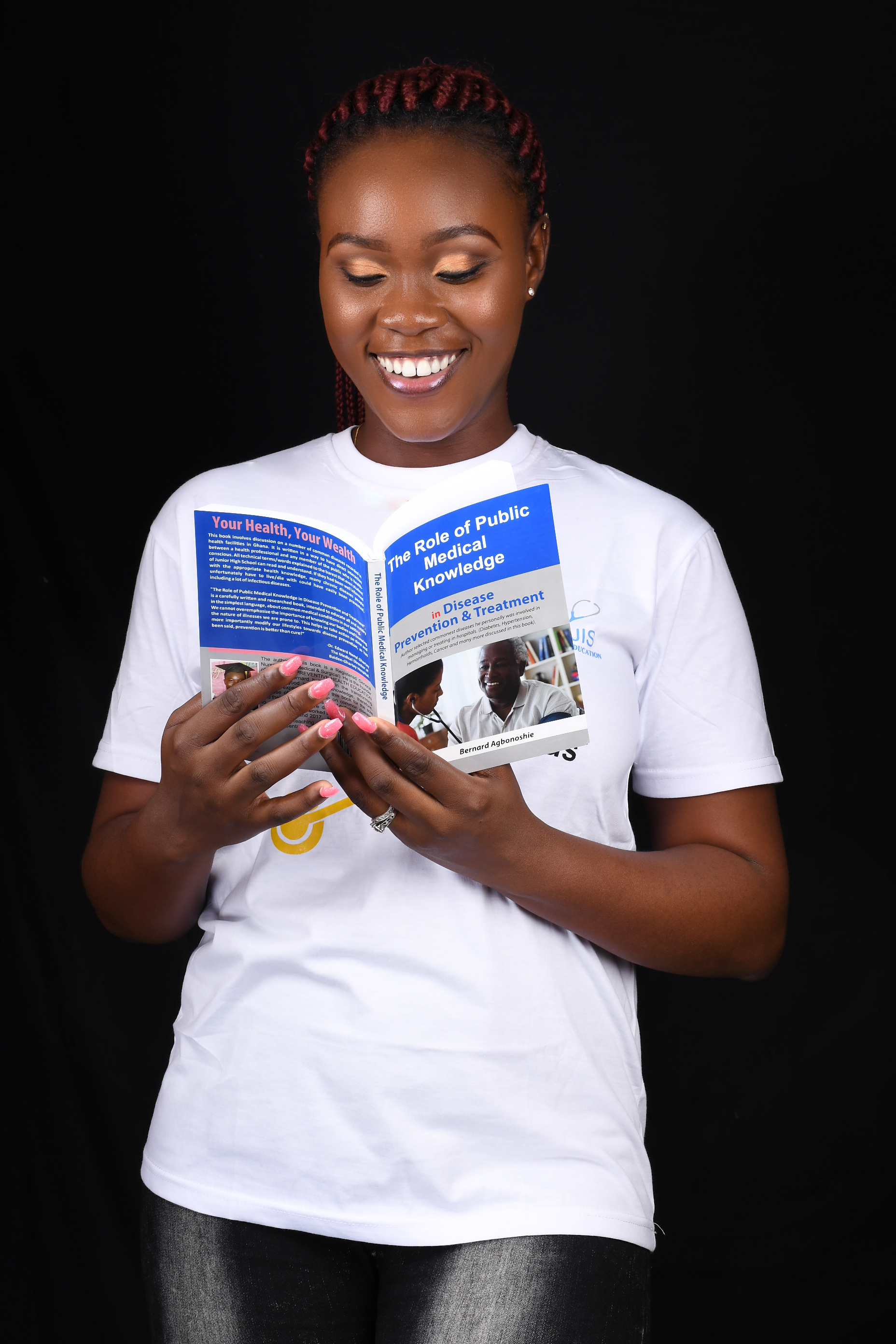
- Born: 7 January 1990 (age 36); Kumasi, Ghana
- Education: Kwame Nkrumah University (B.A.)
- Occupations: Author, editor, reporter
- Employer: Yen News
- Organization: Book Per Child Initiative
- Notable work: Against The Odds!
- Children: 1

Portia Arthur (born 7 January 1990) is a Ghanaian writer and reporter. She launched her first book titled Against the Odds in July 2018. She also started the Book Per Child Initiative, which aims to inspire young people to read by supporting them with educational materials and establishing reading clubs in various schools and churches. Since 2022, she is the fashion editor for Yen News, following six years as a lifestyle editor for Pulse Africa in Ghana.

== Education ==
Arthur graduated from the Kwame Nkrumah University in 2013, earning a B.A. in publishing Studies. She continued to acquire management skills through Udemy courses, including PMP Certification Training.

== Career ==
After studying publishing at university, Arthur's first job was as a lifestyle writer for Pulse Africa, in Ghana, under the supervision of Godfred Akoto Boafo. Inspired by one story she reported on, about the lack of school infrastructure in my neighborhood, she started a project called "The Book Per Child Initiative". As she has said, she saw it as "a way of improving the literacy level of our future leaders. But I reckoned what better way to contribute to solving the problem I had spotted than by tapping into my publishing training and passion for writing a book? I also realized I could sponsor some kids with their tuition with proceeds from book sales." As part of the project, her first book, Against the Odds, was launched in 2018.

In 2020, she was appointed General Manager of Blackbusters Family Media. Following six years as a lifestyle editor at Pulse, she joined Yen News as its fashion editor, in 2022.

== Recognition ==
Arthur was nominated as the Fashion/Lifestyle Blogger of the Year at the 2019 Ghana Lifestyle Awards. She was also nominated for the MakeUp Blog of the Year at the 2019 Ghana MakeUp Awards for her contribution to Pulse Lifestyle on Pulse Ghana.
