= Yen.com.gh =

Ghanaian online news publication

YEN.com.gh
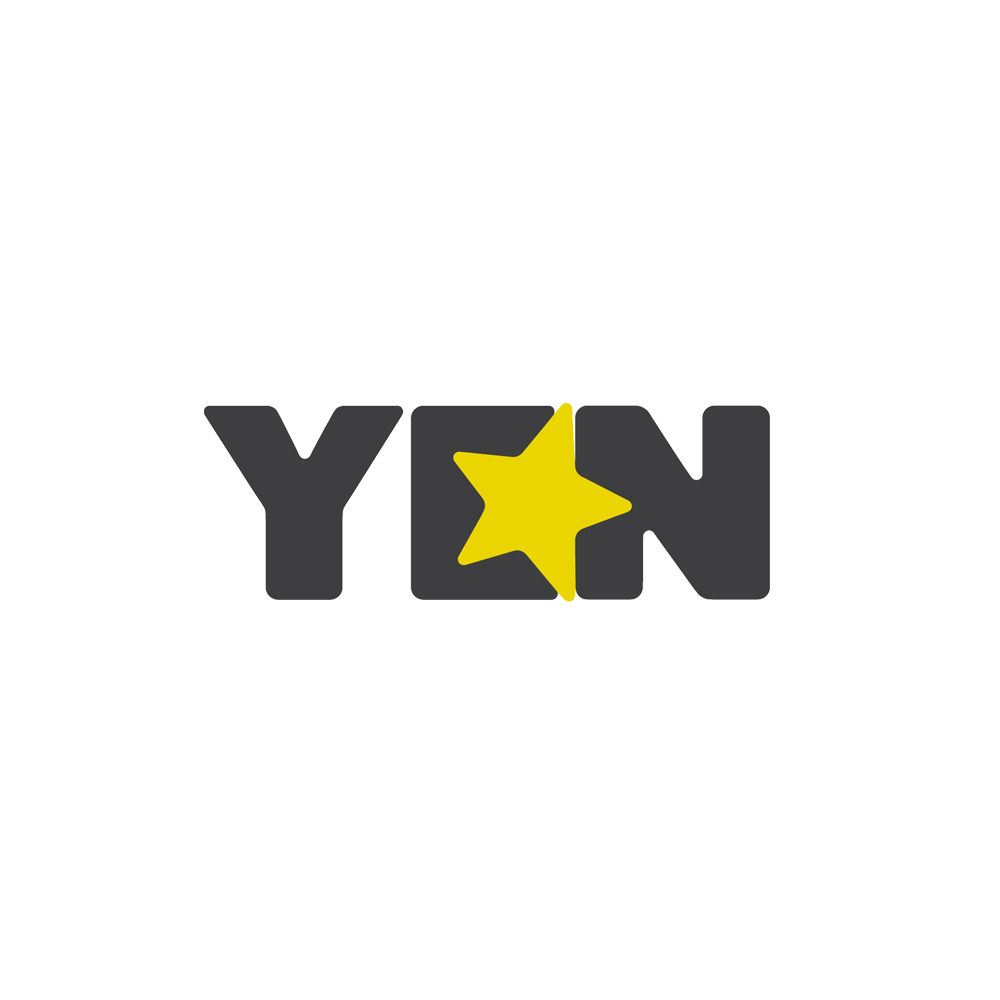
- Website type: News, entertainment and political website
- Available in: English
- Founded: 2015; 11 years ago
- Headquarters: Accra, {{{location_country}}}
- Employees: 20+
- Website: yen.com.gh
- Registration: None
- Launched: 2015; 11 years ago
- Current status: Active

YEN.com.gh (or YEN News) is a Ghanaian online news publication created in September 2015. It covers local and international news, politics, business, entertainment, technology, sport news and users’ generated news content.

== History ==
YEN.com.gh was founded in 2015. It is a partner of Legit (formerly GMEM), a digital media holding which also cooperates with Tuko.co.ke (in Kenya), Legit.ng (in Nigeria), Sports Brief (worldwide), and Briefly News (in South Africa). It has its headquarters in Accra and covers local and international news, politics, business, entertainment, technology, sport news and users' generated news content. It has presence in web, social media and mobile platforms, particularly on Android.

In February 2021, YEN.com.gh was highlighted as a member of the UN SDG Media Compact, with a focus on promoting awareness of the Sustainable Development Goals (SDGs).

Yen.com.gh introduced new content directions in June 2022, focusing on Real Estate and Style to provide a more comprehensive and engaging experience.

In December 2022, YEN.com.gh started the YEN Entertainment Awards to honor and celebrate outstanding achievements in Ghana's creative sector. Notable nominees included Stonebwoy, Black Sherif, Nana McBrown, Diana, Hamilton, Lil Win, Jackie Appiah, and Kwadwo Sheldon.

In 2023, YEN News launched Entertainment Award 2024 for the second time.

In 2023, Yen.com.gh joined the International News Media Association.

== Rankings ==
In November 2019, YEN.com.gh received the title of Best Online News Portal at the National Communications Awards in Accra, 2019.

According to Alexa Top Sites rankings by country, Yen.com.gh ranks thirteen in Ghana and is very popular among Ghanaians and people in the United States, United Kingdom, Canada, Italy, South Africa, Netherlands, France and many other countries.

In July 2021, YEN.com.gh achieved recognition as a finalist in the Audience Engagement Category during the WAN-IFRA Digital Media Awards.

That same year, YEN was ranked as the fifteenth major news media publisher globally on Facebook, and №4 in Africa.

== Meaning of name ==
Yen, translated from Twi, a dialect of the Akan language, means "us" or "we" and "our" in the language.

== Features ==
Yen publishes news, business, entertainment and user-generated content. Its first editor-in-chief was Ameyaw Debrah who served from September 2015 to September 2017.

Since 2017 till now, Samuel K. Obour, a journalist with 12 years of experience, has been occupying the position of a Managing Director. The journalists contributing to the platform include Portia Arthur and Ameyaw Debrah.

== Management ==
=== Managing Director: Samuel Obour ===
Samuel has over 12 years of experience in print and digital journalism. https://muckrack.com/samuel-obour Obour started his journalist career at Graphic Communications Group Limited in 2016, contributing to leading publications like The Mirror, Daily Graphic, and Graphic.com.gh. He is a 2010 graduate of the Ghana Institute of Journalism.

=== Head of Entertainment Desk: Jeffery Owusu-Mensah ===
Jeffrey, with 12 years in journalism, began at the Ghana News Agency (GNA) and joined YEN.com.gh in 2017. A 2010 Ghana Institute of Journalism alum, he reports on politics, sports, economics, leisure, and social topics.

=== Head of Human Interest Desk: Philip Kessie ===
Philip, a journalist for over six years, holds a 2018 Communication Studies degree from the University of Cape Coast. He previously reported for Graphic Communication Group Limited (GCGL) and wrote content for Scooper News.
