= Liz McDaid =

South African activist

- Occupations: Eco-Justice Lead, Southern African Faith Communities' Environment Institute
- Awards: 2018 Goldman Environmental Award Africa.; 2021 Eco-Warrior Gold Award South Africa.

Liz McDaid is a South African activist who is the "Eco-Justice Lead" for the Southern African Faith Communities' Environment Institute (SAFCEI). Along with Makoma Lekalakala, she was awarded the 2018 Goldman Environmental Prize for the African region for their work on using the courts to stop a Russian-South African nuclear deal in 2017. In 2018 McDaid and Lekalakala received the Nick Steele Memorial Award for their work in winning a crucial court case to halt plans by the South African government to proceed with a national nuclear build programme. McDaid is currently Head of Energy at Organisation Undoing Tax Abuse.

== Career ==
The "Eco-Justice Lead" for the Southern African Faith Communities' Environment Institute (SAFCEI), Liz McDaid, is a South African activist. She shared the 2018 Goldman Environmental Prize for Africa alongside Makoma Lekalakala for their efforts in 2017 to use the legal system to block a Russian-South African nuclear deal. McDaid and Lekalakala were given the Nick Steele Memorial Award in 2018 for their efforts in defeating the South African government's ambitions to move through with a national nuclear build program by successfully arguing a key legal matter.

== Works ==
In 2014, the government of South Africa reached a confidential agreement with Russia to construct eight to ten nuclear power stations across the country, generating 9.6 gigawatts of nuclear energy. The secret deal came to the attention of Earthlife Africa in the same year. Upon discovering the agreement's financial and environmental implications, Lekalakala and McDaid, along with their colleagues, strategized to oppose the deal. SAFCEI had been advocating for renewable energy to combat climate change and had already taken a stance against South Africa's nuclear industry. Together, the two women developed a plan to challenge the project, including President Zuma himself, on the grounds that the agreement was secret and had bypassed legal procedures without public consultation or parliamentary debate. Lekalakala and McDaid were particularly concerned about the environmental and health effects of scaling up uranium mining, nuclear power generation, and nuclear waste production. They spoke to communities across the country and explained the project's financial risks and environmental and human health consequences. McDaid organized weekly anti-nuclear vigils outside Cape Town's Parliament to hold parliamentarians accountable. Lekalakala and McDaid also held public rallies and marches to protest the nuclear project, demonstrating throughout South Africa. On April 26, 2017, the Western Cape High Court declared the nuclear deal unconstitutional, nullifying the agreement and terminating the $76 billion nuclear power project. Lekalakala and McDaid's legal triumph was a landmark victory that protected South Africa from the severe development of nuclear infrastructure, which would have had long-lasting environmental, health, and financial consequences for future generations.

== Awards ==
- 2018 Goldman Environmental Award Africa
- 2021 Eco-Warrior Gold Award South Africa
