= Philip Rousseau =

British scholar of early Christianity (1939–2020)

Philip Rousseau (November 3, 1939 – September 3, 2020) was a scholar of early Christianity who held the Andrew W. Mellon Distinguished Professor of Early Christian Studies and was the director of the Center for the Study of Early Christianity at Catholic University of America.

== Works ==
- Rousseau, Philip (2010) [1978]. Ascetics, Authority, and the Church in the Age of Jerome and Cassian. University of Notre Dame Press. ISBN 978-0-268-04029-1.
- Rousseau, Philip (1999) [1985]. Pachomius: The Making of a Community in Fourth-Century Egypt. University of California Press. ISBN 978-0-520-21959-5.
- Rousseau, Philip (1998). Basil of Caesarea. University of California Press. ISBN 978-0-520-21381-4.
- Rousseau, Philip (2002). The Early Christian Centuries. Longman. ISBN 978-0-582-25653-8.
