= Oliver Rousseau =

American architect (1891–1977)

Oliver Marion Rousseau
- Born: December 6, 1891; San Francisco, California, U.S.
- Died: May 30, 1977 (aged 85); San Francisco, California, U.S.
- Burial place: Holy Cross Cemetery, Colma, California, U.S.
- Occupations: Architect, builder, real estate developer
- Spouse: Irene Martha Caubu (married 1912–1918; divorced)
- Children: 1
- Father: Charles M. Rousseau

Oliver Marion Rousseau (1891–1977) was an American architect, home builder/contractor, and real estate developer. He worked in the San Francisco Bay Area, in particular the Sunset District of San Francisco, as well as Hayward, California. He came from a family of noted architects and co-founded the architecture firm Rousseau and Rousseau, and later the Marian Realty Co..

== Early life and family ==
Oliver Marion Rousseau was born on December 6, 1891, in San Francisco, California. He had six siblings, and their parents were Frances (née Scheibli) and Charles Marion Rousseau (1848–1918). His father, Charles M., was of Belgium ancestry and was born in Rotterdam; he was also an early architect in the city of San Francisco. His two older brothers were Charles John Rousseau (1879–1944) and Arthur Frank Rousseau (1885–1943), were both also architects. The Rousseau family home was located at 1903 Webster Street in San Francisco starting roughly in 1901.

In 1912, Oliver Rousseau married Irene Martha (née Caubu), they had one child; the local newspapers published the couple's separation in 1916. By 1918, they filed for divorce. The Rousseau's divorce was public and "messy", and around the same time his brother Arthur experienced a similar divorce situation.

== Career ==
Charles M. and his son Arthur Frank collaborated and formed the firm, Rousseau and Son located at 927 Market Street (the Emma Spreckels Building), active from roughly 1901 until 1905. Arthur Frank, then co-founded the architecture firm Rousseau and Rousseau with his brother Oliver, initially located in the same office at 927 Market Street and primarily working in the San Francisco Bay Area. Their father Charles served as the vice president of Rousseau and Rousseau, until his death in 1918. The office for Rousseau and Rousseau moved to 110 Sutter Street, and later to 1141 Market Street in San Francisco in 1923.

In 1922, the two brothers founded the Marian Realty Co. and focused on building hotels, office buildings and apartment houses until the Great Depression. Oliver worked as the architect designing all of the buildings, while Arthur focused on raising money. A 1925 San Francisco Examiner newspaper article headlined “Rousseaus to Boost Sunset.” In 1930, the company pivoted to residential construction and they focused on the Sunset District of San Francisco. The residential houses they designed were often English Tudor Revival, storybook, or Spanish Colonial Revival, and were described as "fairy tale"; these homes are commonly referred to as "Rousseaus". Their designs were a departure from the cookie-cutter homes prevalent in the Sunset District at the time. The Rousseau brothers quickly became among the largest landowners of the Outer Sunset, and developed about 150 lots in the zone, most notably between Kirkham and Lawton streets, and 34th and 36th avenues. In February 1935, Rousseau inaugurated his new "patio plan" signature design on 1578 35th Avenue. The style, which felt a notch above the regular suburban style of the area, was quickly replicated by their real estate competitors, including Henry Doelger, Donell Jaekle and Charles Clausen. Exposed structural steel beams in the garages are supposedly the signature of a true Rousseau house.

According to SF historian Lorri Ungaretti: "There is a sameness of the central Sunset, block after block of quiet streets where the houses look all the same. Rousseau came along and broke that up. He created something that's more whimsical and fun. He put a little charm in every house, and each one is just enough different to make it attractive."

In 1933, Marian Realty Co. declared bankruptcy. Oliver separated from his family business at that point and went on to work as an architect on a development in the East Bay, primarily tract homes and apartment buildings. He also remarried to Elsie Isabel Valpey, they had two daughters.

During World War II, Rousseau built housing for war workers in Richmond and San Bruno, and 4,000 in Hayward. During the 1950s, he presided over the San Francisco Planning and Public Utilities Commission.

Rousseau died on May 30, 1977, in San Francisco, California. Herb Caen wrote, upon his death, "Another Memorial Day death: Oliver Rousseau, who built good houses while all about him, the pure schlock was rising."

In 2012, a proposition was published to designate the Kirkham-Lawton Streets / 34th–36th Avenues perimeter as a landmark district, but the proposition stalled over the years.

== List of notable buildings ==
- Edison Apartments (1914), 618 Bush Street, San Francisco, California; architects Rousseau and Rousseau, part of the NRHP-listed Lower Nob Hill Apartment Hotel District
- Cameo Apartments (1916), 485 Eddy Street (now 481 Eddy Street), San Francisco, California; designed by Rousseau and Rousseau, part of the NRHP-listed Uptown Tenderloin Historic District
- Egyptian Theatre (1924), 1067–1071 Market Street, San Francisco, California; architects Rousseau and Rousseau, part of the NRHP-listed Market Street Theatre and Loft District
- 1564 36th Avenue (1932), San Francisco, California; the model home for Sunset neighborhood development

== See also ==
- Henry Doelger, another housing developer associated with San Francisco's Sunset District
