= Charles F. Rousseau =

Luxembourg philatelist

Charles F. Rousseau (1908 – 22 October 1976) was a Luxembourg philatelist who was added to the Roll of Distinguished Philatelists in 1973.

Rousseau was the special representative for Luxembourg for the Royal Philatelic Society London.
