= John Chapman (Medal of Honor, 1865) =

Medal of Honor recipient (1844–1905)

- Born: February 10, 1844; Strasbourg, Bas-Rhin, France
- Died: September 30, 1905 (aged 61); San Francisco, California, U.S.
- Burial place: Holy Cross Catholic Cemetery
- Military career
- Allegiance: United States of America
- Branch: US Army; US Navy
- Service years: 1864–1865 (Army); 1865–1868 (Navy)
- Rank: Private (Army); Fireman Second Class
- Unit: 1st Regiment Maine Volunteer Heavy Artillery
- Conflicts: Battle of Sayler's Creek
- Awards: Medal of Honor

John Chapman (born Charles Felix Kauffman, February 10, 1844 – September 30, 1905) was a French soldier who fought in the American Civil War. Chapman received the United States' highest award for bravery during combat, the Medal of Honor, for his action during the Battle of Sayler's Creek in Virginia on 6 April 1865. He was honored with the award on 10 May 1865.

== Biography ==
Chapman was born in Strasbourg, France on 10 February 1844. He joined the 1st Maine Heavy Artillery from Limerick, Maine in October 1864, and was discharged in September 1865. He subsequently served in the US Navy from 1865 to 1868. Chapman died on 30 September 1905 and his remains are interred at the Holy Cross Catholic Cemetery in South San Francisco, Central California.

== Medal of Honor citation ==
Captured the enemies flag at a battle in Sailors Creek Va.

== See also ==
- List of American Civil War Medal of Honor recipients: A–F
