= Makoma Lekalakala =

- Occupations: Director, Earthlife Africa-Johannesburg
- Awards: Goldman Environmental Prize

Makoma Lekalakala is a South African activist who is the director of the Johannesburg branch of Earthlife Africa. Along with Liz McDaid, she was awarded the 2018 Goldman Environmental Prize for the African region for their work on using the courts to stop a Russian-South African nuclear deal in 2017.

== Early life ==
Lekalakala grew up in Soweto, South Africa. She had five siblings, and was raised by her mother after her father died in 1976. She became increasingly aware of social issues and injustices as she saw her mother struggle to put food on the table and her community denied electricity from the local power station because of apartheid attitudes.

== Career ==
In 1983, Lekalakala gained experience in community organizing as a shop steward for the Commercial Catering and Allied Workers Union. She joined Earthlife Africa in 2007 and began developing a forum for women to join public discussion around energy and climate change issues.

== Works ==
In 2014, the government of South Africa reached a confidential agreement with Russia to construct eight to ten nuclear power stations across the country, generating 9.6 gigawatts of nuclear energy. The secret deal came to the attention of Earthlife Africa in the same year. Upon discovering the agreement's financial and environmental implications, Lekalakala and McDaid, along with their colleagues, strategized to oppose the deal. SAFCEI had been advocating for renewable energy to combat climate change and had already taken a stance against South Africa's nuclear industry. Together, the two women developed a plan to challenge the project, including President Zuma himself, on the grounds that the agreement was secret and had bypassed legal procedures without public consultation or parliamentary debate. Lekalakala and McDaid were particularly concerned about the environmental and health effects of scaling up uranium mining, nuclear power generation, and nuclear waste production. They spoke to communities across the country and explained the project's financial risks and environmental and human health consequences. Lekalakala and McDaid also held public rallies and marches to protest the nuclear project, demonstrating throughout South Africa. On April 26, 2017, the Western Cape High Court declared the nuclear deal unconstitutional, nullifying the agreement and terminating the $76 billion nuclear power project. Lekalakala and McDaid's legal triumph was a landmark victory that protected South Africa from the severe development of nuclear infrastructure, which would have had long-lasting environmental, health, and financial consequences for future generations.

== Awards ==
- 2018 Goldman Environmental Award Africa
- 2021 Eco-Warrior Gold Award South Africa
