= Melene Rossouw =

Nigerian South african Lawyer

Melene Rossouw is a South African lawyer and women's rights activist. In 2020, she was listed as one of the 100 most influential young Africans by Africa Youth Awards. She founded the Women Lead Movement, a South African non-governmental organization, in 2017.

== Early life ==
Rossouw is from Bellville South. She lived in a dwelling in her aunt's backyard for the first nine years of her life before her mother Deserie earned enough to get them an apartment. Rossouw was athletic growing up, participating in competitions in Pretoria. She graduated with a Bachelor of Laws and a Master of Laws with a specialty in Public and Constitutional Law, both from the University of the Western Cape.
