= Charles M. Rousseau =

Belgium-born American architect (1848–1918)

Charles Marion Rousseau
- Born: September 23, 1848; Rotterdam, Kingdom of Belgium (now the Netherlands)
- Died: November 15, 1918 (aged 70); San Francisco, California, U.S.
- Burial place: Holy Cross Cemetery
- Other names: Chas. M. Rousseau
- Occupation: Architect
- Years active: 1880–1918
- Spouse: Frances R. Scheibli
- Children: 7, including Oliver Rousseau

Charles Marion Rousseau (1848–1918) was a Kingdom of Belgium-born American architect. He was an early architect in the city of San Francisco, California. He co-founded the architecture firm Rousseau and Son, and raised three sons who all became noted architects.

== Early life ==
Rousseau was born on September 23, 1848, in Rotterdam, Kingdom of Belgium (now the Netherlands); he was of Belgium ancestry. His father was Peter Rousseau (born c. 1811), who worked as a florist.

The exact date of immigration is unknown, but it is thought to have been in 1876. The Rousseau family initially moved to Saint Louis, Missouri, where he worked as a draftsman with the architectural firm of McKim, Mead & White. He married in c. 1878.

== Career ==
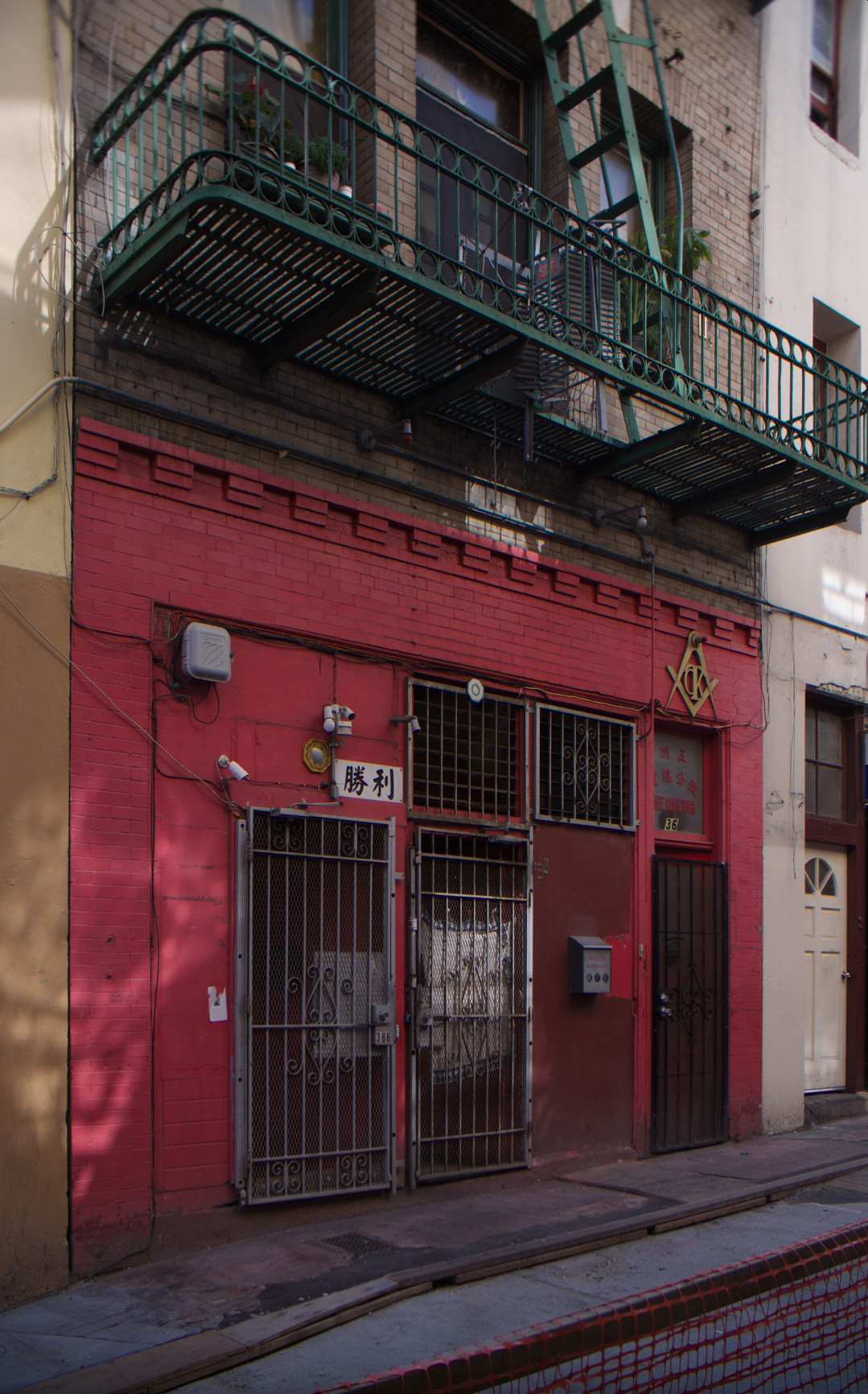
Chee Kung Tong building at 36–38 Spoffard Alley, Chinatown, San Francisco, California, U.S.

Between roughly 1885 to 1900, the family moved to San Francisco, California. The family house was located at 1903 Webster Street in San Francisco, California.

In 1890, he opened his own architecture firm. Charles M. and his son Arthur Frank collaborated and formed the firm, Rousseau and Son located at 927 Market Street (the Emma Spreckels Building), active from roughly 1901 until 1905. During the California Midwinter International Exposition of 1894, Rousseau was awarded to silver medals for his architectural designs.

In 1907, he designed the Chee Kung Tong building for the Chinese–American secret society headquarters at 36–38 Spoffard Alley in Chinatown, San Francisco. The building at 36–38 Spoffard Alley served as the temporary home for Chinese statesman Sun Yat-sen while he lived in exile.

In 1908, Rousseau travelled to Europe for a year. He authored the book, The Analysis of Light, a Force of Nature (1913, Louis Roesch printer co.).

Rousseau died on November 15, 1918, in his home in San Francisco, California. He is buried at Holy Cross Cemetery in Colma, California.

== Personal life ==
In c. 1878, Rousseau married Frances "Fannie" R. Scheibli, from Frankfort, Kentucky. Together they had seven children. Their three sons all worked in architecture and buildings in the San Francisco Bay Area, Charles John Rousseau (1879–1944), Arthur Frank Rousseau (1885–1943), and Oliver Marion Rousseau (1891–1977). It is thought that he taught all three of his sons architecture.

== List of notable buildings ==
- S. Lindner House (c. 1899), Pine Street at Buchanan Street, San Francisco, California
- Paulme Flats (c. 1899; demolished), 637 Minna Street between 7th and 8th Streets, San Francisco, California; for tailor and vest designer, Eugene Paulme
- S. C. Spinney store and residence (c. 1899), San Francisco, California; carriage maker
- Louis Schoenberg store and apartments (c. 1899), Market Street (near 8th Street), Civic Center, San Francisco, California
- George Marseley apartment houses (c. 1899), 733 Haight Street, San Francisco, California; three flats in a single building
- C. Gaudin apartment houses (c. 1899), 1322 Webster Street, Fillmore District, San Francisco, California; three flats in a single building
- Chee Kung Tong building (or the Chinese Free Masons building) (1907), 36–38 Spoffard Alley, Chinatown, San Francisco, California
- 556 Commercial Street (1908), commercial building, Financial District, San Francisco, California
- Larkin and Jackson street apartment house (1917), San Francisco, California
Buildings by Rousseau

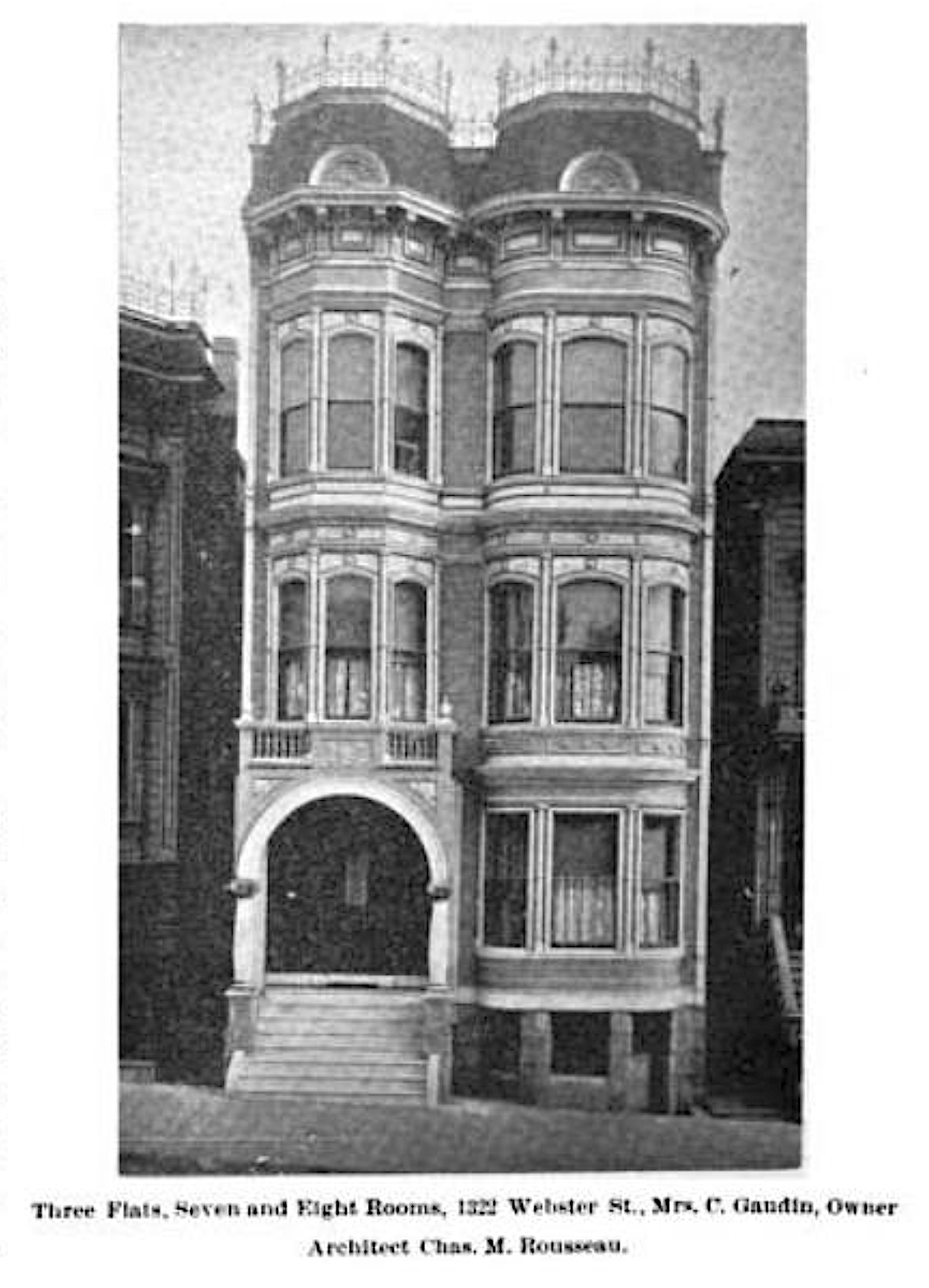
1322 Webster Street

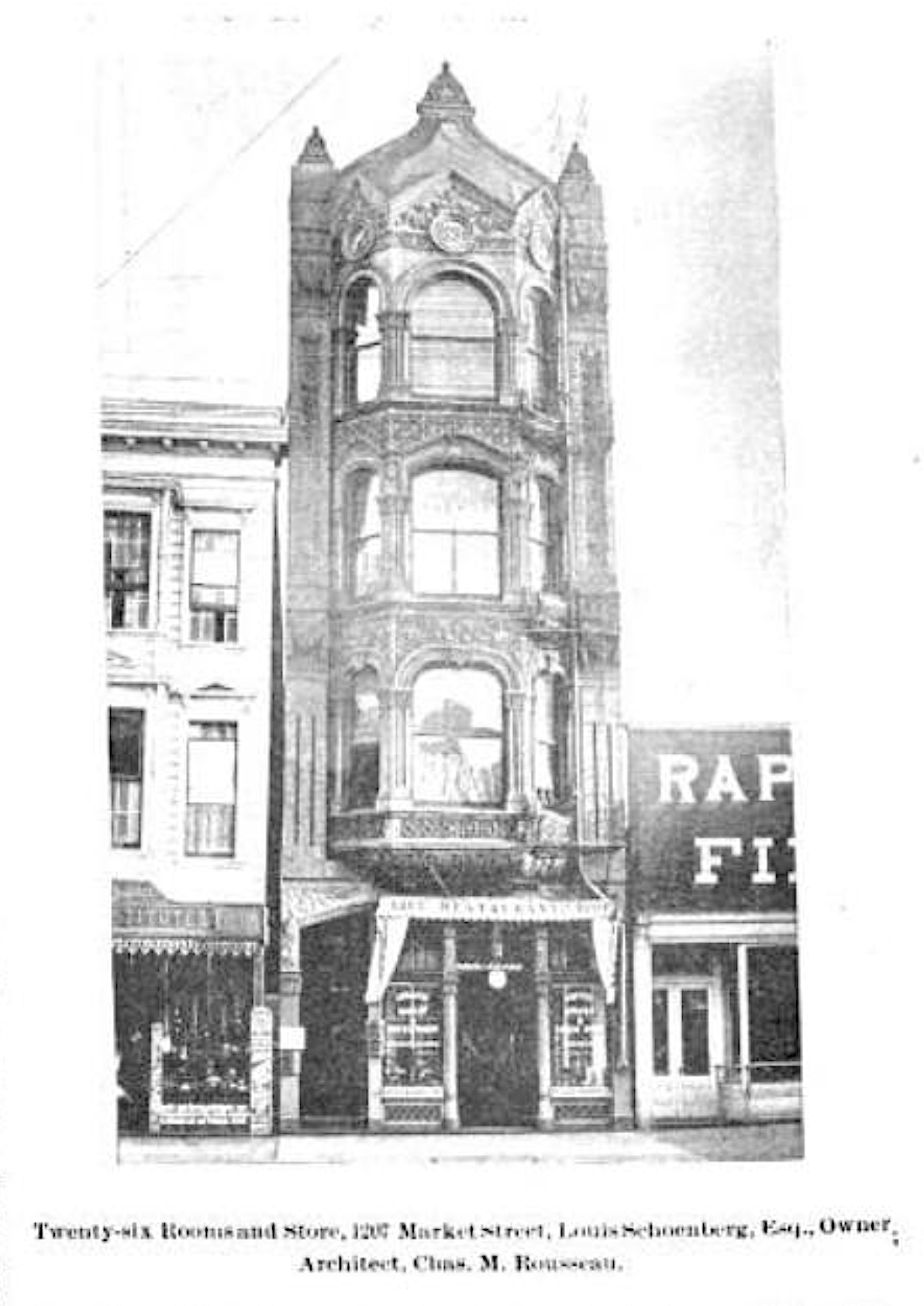
1207 Market Street, near 8th Street

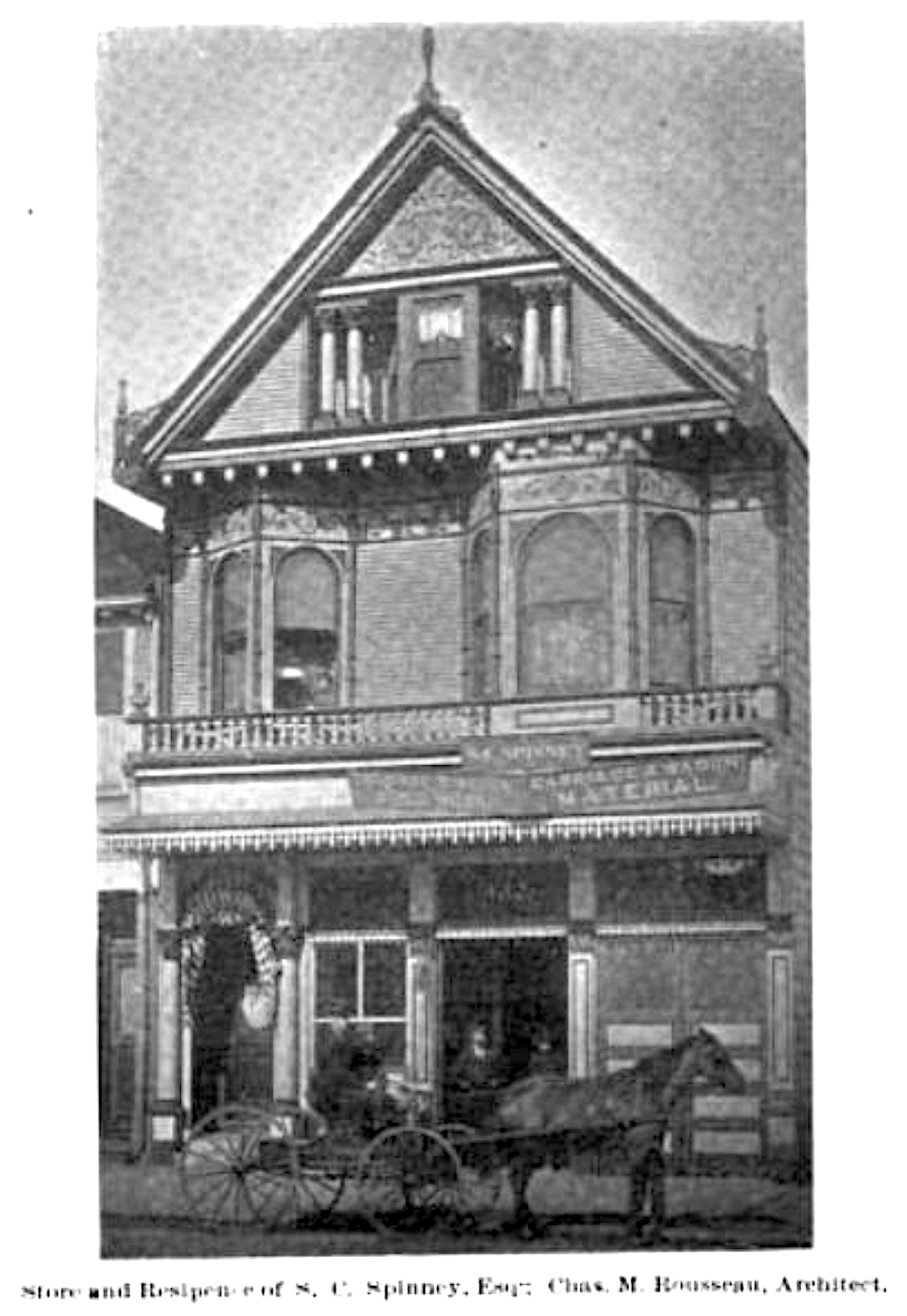
Store and residence for S. C. Spinney

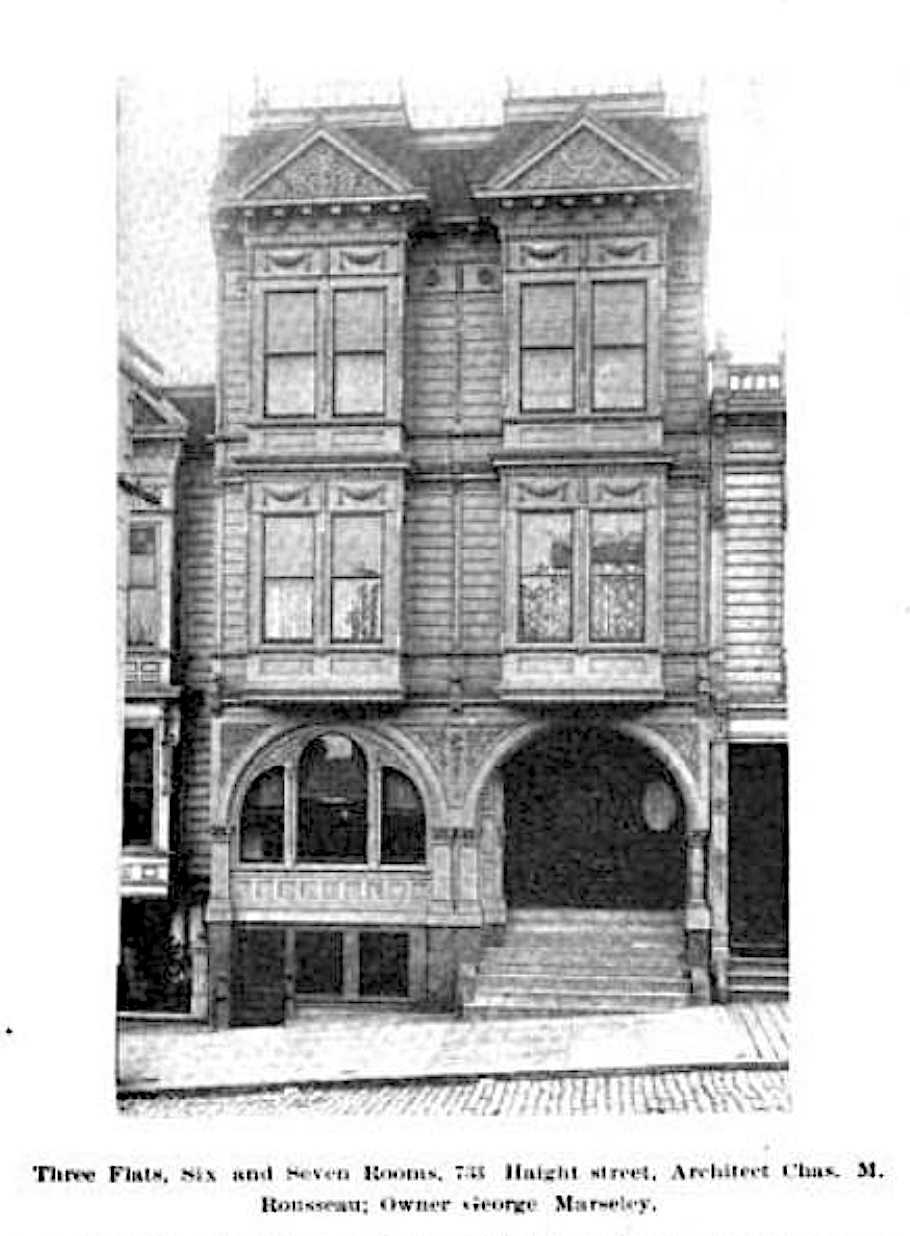
733 Haight Street

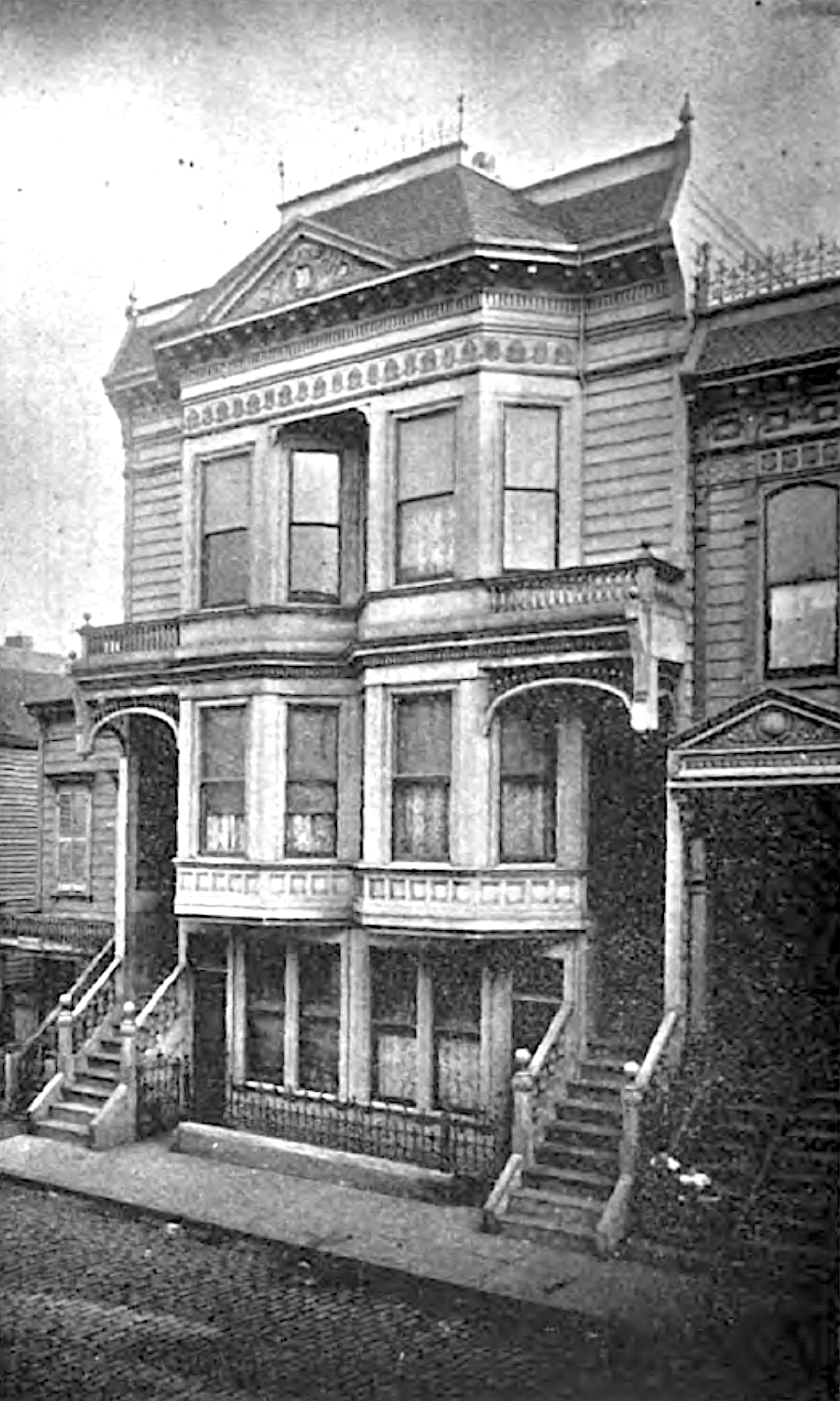
Paulme Flats, Minna Street

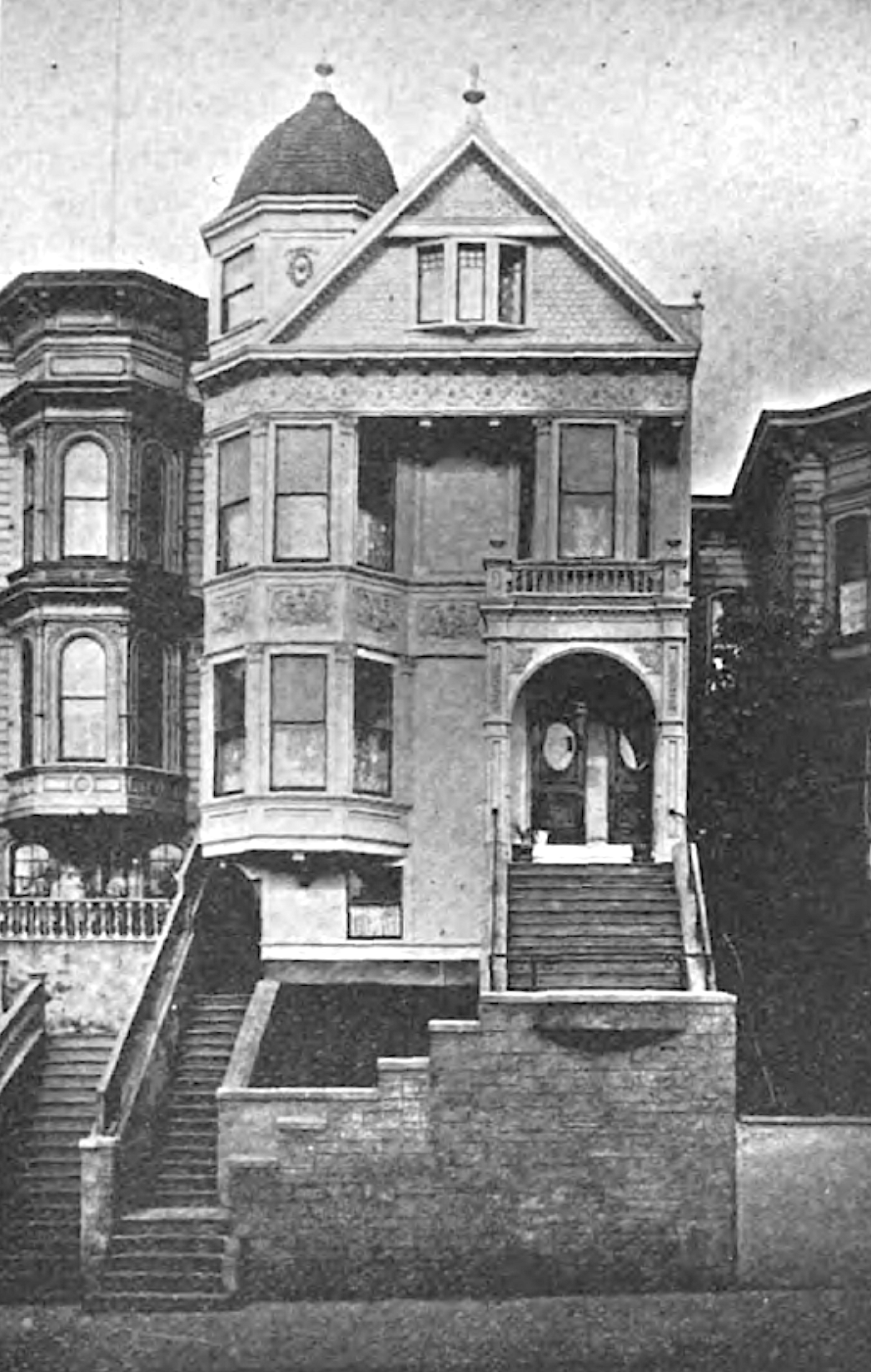
S. Lindner House, Pine Street
