= Krušćica =

Krušćica may refer to:

- Kruščica, Konjic, a village in Bosnia and Herzegovina
- Krušćica, Vitez, a village in Bosnia and Herzegovina
- Lake Krušćica, a lake in Croatia

== See also ==
- Kruščica (disambiguation)
