= Climate change in Malawi =

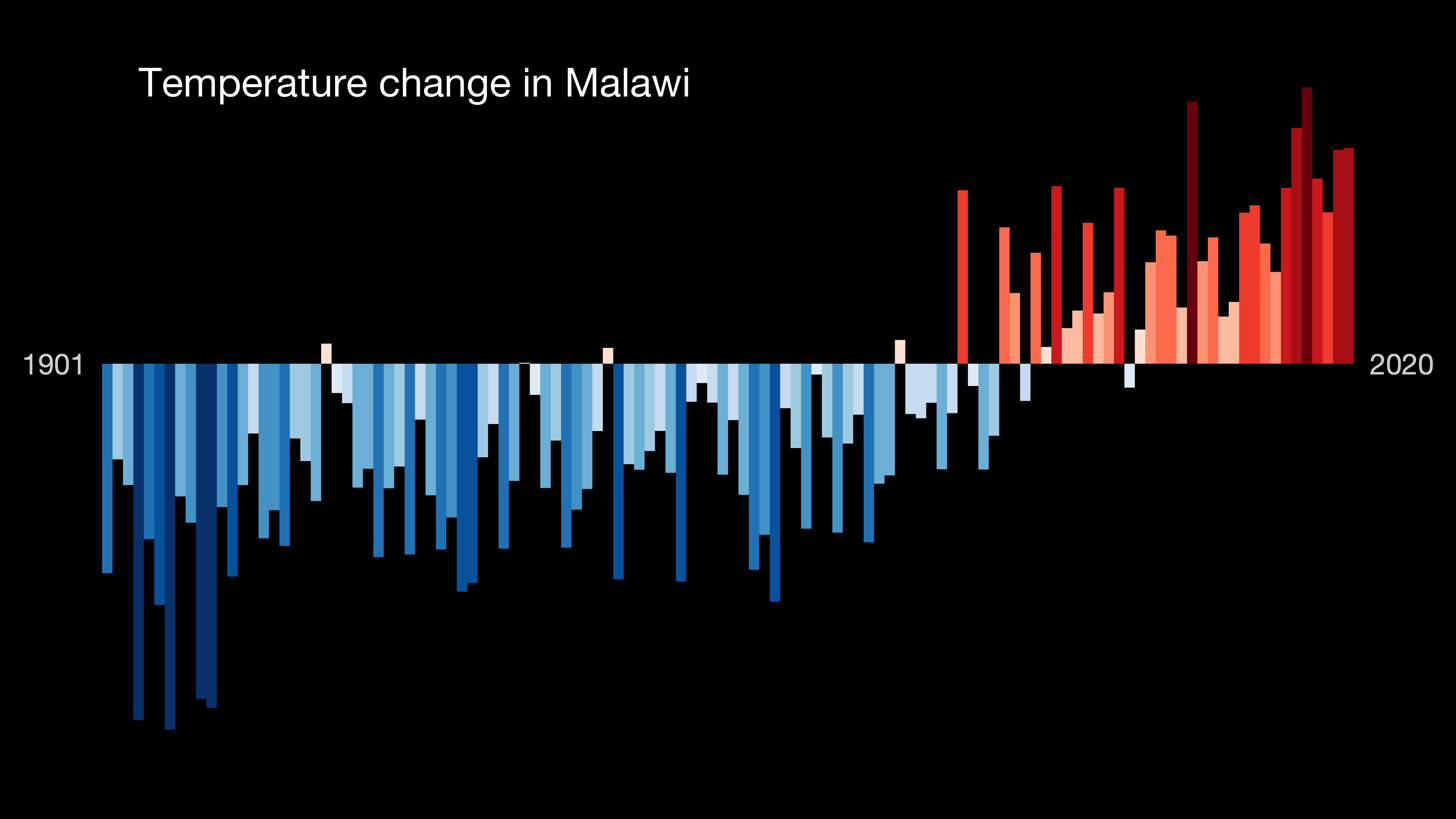
The observed warming in Malawi between 1901 and 2021

Malawi is a land-locked country in southeastern Africa situated along the southernmost arm of the East African Rift-Valley System between latitudes 9°22' and 17°03' south of the equator, and longitudes 33°40' and 35°55' east of the Greenwich meridian. It shares borders with Tanzania in the north and northeast, Mozambique in the southwest, south, and east, and Zambia in the west. Malawi is highly vulnerable to the effects of climate change as the vast majority of Malawians rely on small-scale, rain-fed agriculture, making them highly dependent on weather patterns. Climate change increasingly exacerbates droughts, flooding, and inconsistent rainfall—contributing to food insecurity and threatening to derail progress toward Malawi's goal of self-reliance.

== Greenhouse Gas Emissions ==
Malawi emitted a total of 10.85 million metric tons of carbon dioxide equivalent (MtCO2e) in 2011, accounting for merely 0.02 percent of global greenhouse gas (GHG) emissions. The land-use change and forestry sector contributed 56 percent of Malawi's GHG emissions, followed by the agriculture, waste, and industrial processes sectors, which collectively contributed 40 percent, 2 percent, and 2 percent, respectively. Between 1990 and 2011, GHG emissions in Malawi witnessed a 14 percent increase, whereas the country's Gross Domestic Product (GDP) experienced a notable growth of 126 percent during the same time frame. However, despite the faster growth of GDP, Malawi's economy emitted approximately three times more GHGs relative to GDP compared to the global average in 2011, suggesting the potential for improvement. According to UNDP, Malawi had 0.04% Share of global GHG emissions, with 158 Climate Vulnerability Index ranking, 169 Human Development Index ranking, 51% Conditional emissions reduction target by 2040 as of July 2021.

Fossil Carbon Dioxide (CO2) emissions of Malawi.
Year	Fossil CO2 Emissions ( tons )	CO2 emissions change	CO2 emissions per capita	Population	Pop . change	Share of World's CO2 emissions
2016	1,815,598	3.26%	0.1	17,405,624	2.76%	0.01%
2015	1,758,327	0.15%	0.1	16,938,942	2.80%	0.00%
2014	1,755,703	6.17%	0.11	16,477,966	2.83%	0.00%
2013	1,653,643	3.51%	0.1	16,024,775	2.85%	0.00%
2012	1,597,618	1.98%	0.1	15,581,251	2.87%	0.00%
2011	1,566,662	2.30%	0.1	15,146,094	2.91%	0.00%
2010	1,531,406	7.80%	0.1	14,718,422	2.93%	0.00%
2009	1,420,539	-0.91%	0.1	14,298,932	2.95%	0.00%
2008	1,433,560	6.27%	0.1	13,889,423	2.92%	0.00%
2007	1,348,951	5.73%	0.1	13,495,463	2.88%	0.00%
2006	1,275,876	3.44%	0.1	13,118,307	2.84%	0.00%
2005	1,233,487	3.23%	0.1	12,755,648	2.77%	0.00%
2004	1,194,937	3.97%	0.1	12,411,342	2.68%	0.00%
2003	1,149,325	1.77%	0.1	12,087,965	2.58%	0.00%
2002	1,129,387	2.24%	0.1	11,784,498	2.48%	0.00%
2001	1,104,693	5.90%	0.1	11,498,818	2.40%	0.00%
2000	1,043,156	-3.30%	0.09	11,229,387	2.33%	0.00%
1999	1,078,757	5.87%	0.1	10,973,956	2.25%	0.00%
1998	1,018,990	-10.92%	0.09	10,732,456	2.09%	0.00%
1997	1,143,953	18.66%	0.11	10,512,678	1.96%	0.00%
1996	964,064	-0.68%	0.09	10,310,528	1.96%	0.00%
1995	970,671	4.91%	0.1	10,112,816	-0.19%	0.00%
1994	925,247	18.76%	0.09	10,131,799	-1.22%	0.00%
1993	779,070	-0.77%	0.08	10,257,233	1.40%	0.00%
1992	785,137	-0.12%	0.08	10,115,420	2.89%	0.00%
1991	786,057	19.29%	0.08	9,831,584	3.06%	0.00%
1990	658,919	-8.82%	0.07	9,539,665	3.98%	0.00%
1989	722,640	6.61%	0.08	9,174,895	4.80%	0.00%
1988	677,845	-2.54%	0.08	8,754,781	5.53%	0.00%
1987	695,483	25.12%	0.08	8,295,993	4.88%	0.00%
1986	555,847	3.79%	0.07	7,909,819	3.73%	0.00%
1985	535,545	6.30%	0.07	7,625,078	3.90%	0.00%
1984	503,812	-4.74%	0.07	7,339,002	3.98%	0.00%
1983	528,893	-10.57%	0.07	7,058,317	4.04%	0.00%
1982	591,389	-7.92%	0.09	6,784,347	4.06%	0.00%
1981	642,266	-3.60%	0.1	6,519,891	4.03%	0.00%
1980	666,247	-6.64%	0.11	6,267,369	3.95%	0.00%
1979	713,649	13.63%	0.12	6,029,140	3.79%	0.00%
1978	628,052	14.78%	0.11	5,808,810	3.51%	0.00%
1977	547,192	-0.11%	0.1	5,611,712	3.19%	0.00%
1976	547,811	-5.55%	0.1	5,438,226	2.98%	0.00%
1975	580,029	13.90%	0.11	5,280,965	2.86%	0.00%
1974	509,239	3.53%	0.1	5,134,199	2.76%	0.00%
1973	491,868	3.90%	0.1	4,996,239	2.68%	0.00%
1972	473,413	0.41%	0.1	4,865,978	2.60%	0.00%
1971	471,501	0.54%	0.1	4,742,480	2.54%	0.00%

== Impact on the Natural Environment ==
=== Temperature and weather changes ===
Köppen climate classification map for Malawi for 1980–2016

2071–2100 map under the most intense climate change scenario. Mid-range scenarios are currently considered more likely

Malawi has encountered climate change and climate variability in recent decades, leading to a proliferation of severe climate-related shocks that have experienced an increase in frequency over the past few decades resulting in a series of devastating climate shocks that have become more frequent in recent years. These shocks include irregular rainfall, droughts, extended periods of dry weather, and powerful winds. The altering climate has had an impact on numerous sectors of the economy, including agriculture, health, water, energy, transportation, education, gender, forestry, wildlife, and infrastructure.

Malawi experiences two primary seasons: the cool, dry season, which occurs between May and October, with average temperatures of approximately 13 °C in June and July, and the hot, wet season, which takes place from November to April, with temperatures ranging from 30°- 35 °C. Precipitation levels vary depending on the altitude, with rift valley floors receiving approximately 600 mm of rainfall annually and mountainous regions experiencing around 1600 mm. Local variations in rainfall are influenced by the intricate topography, leading to the diversion of moisture-laden winds, ultimately causing precipitation and rain shadow effects in different terrains.

=== Impact on water resources ===
Weather-related shocks are becoming increasingly frequent and devastating in the country, with notable examples being the major floods of 2015 and Cyclone Idai in 2019. Malawi is currently facing heightened surface run-off due to intensified rainfall, resulting in reduced water percolation and retention in groundwater supplies and surface water bodies. Many regions in the country are already observing a decline in the water table, with some perennial rivers transitioning into seasonal ones. The southern area, in particular, exhibits distinct hotspots for weather-related shocks attributed to the decline in annual rainfall and evapotranspiration.

=== Impact on people ===
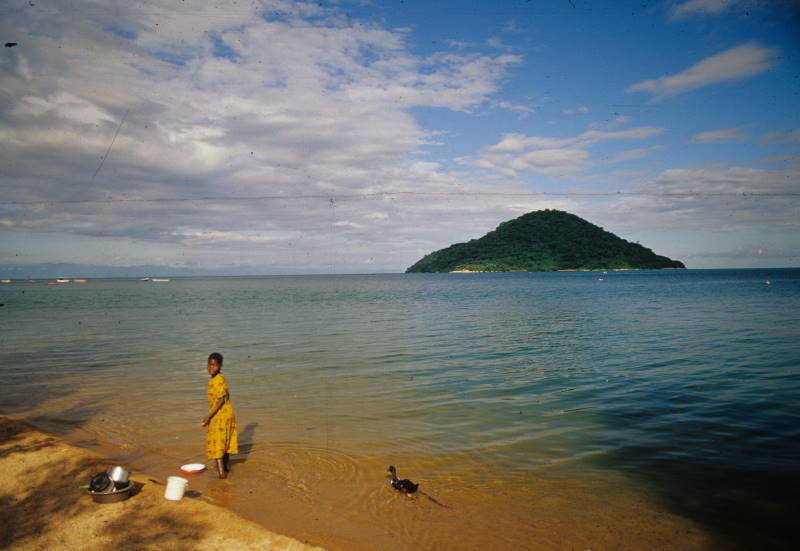
MW Lago Malawi

Droughts and floods, the most severe of these hazards, have exhibited an increase in frequency, intensity, and magnitude over the past two decades, consequently leading to grave implications on food and water security, water quality, energy resources, and sustainable livelihoods of rural communities. Within the period from 1979 to 2008, a total of 2,596 individuals lost their lives due to natural disasters, and nearly an additional 21.7 million people experienced adverse effects. Floods and droughts stand as the primary cause of chronic food security, which remains widespread across various regions within the country.

=== Economic impacts ===
Climate change results in increased variability in crop yields, impacting agricultural productivity - a vital sector for the economy of Malawi. The heightened risk of flooding poses a significant threat to the road infrastructure of Malawi, leading to transportation and connectivity issues. In the absence of climate-informed economic development, the World Bank cautions that climate change could potentially diminish Malawi's GDP by 3 to 9 percent by 2030, 6 to 20 percent by 2040, and 8 to 16 percent by 2050.

=== Agriculture and livestock ===
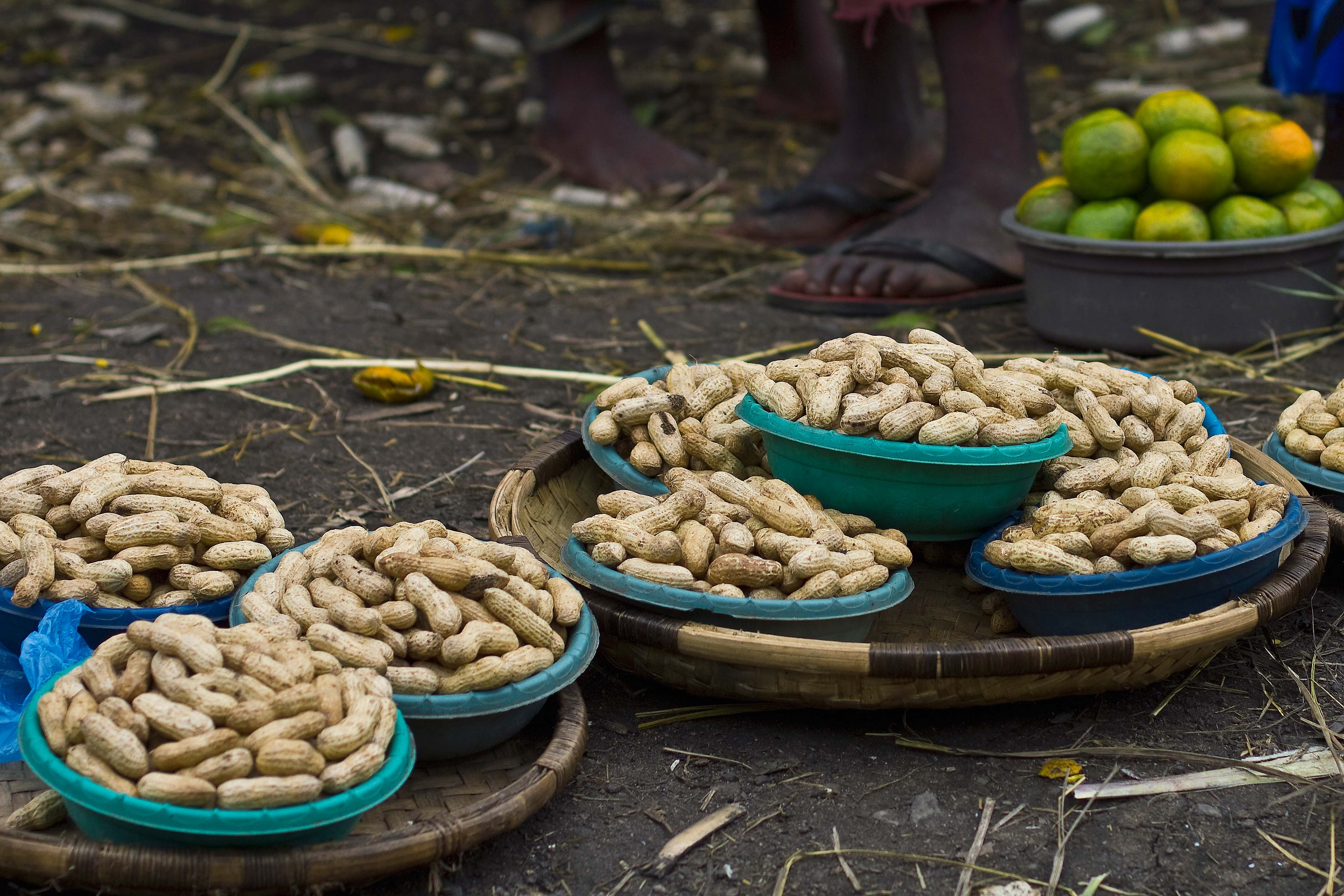
Roadside groundnut market Malawi

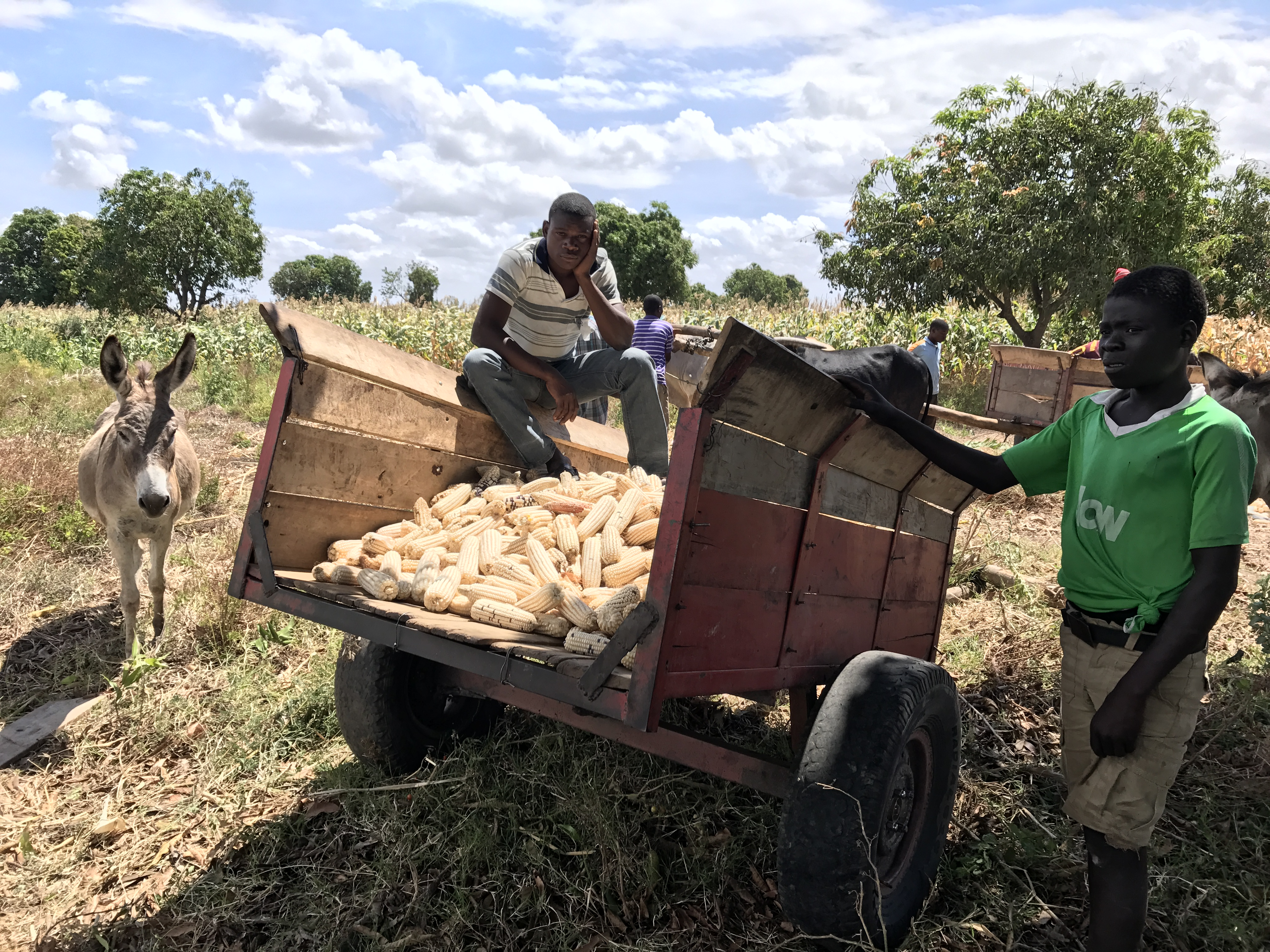
Harvesting in Chikhwawa Malawi

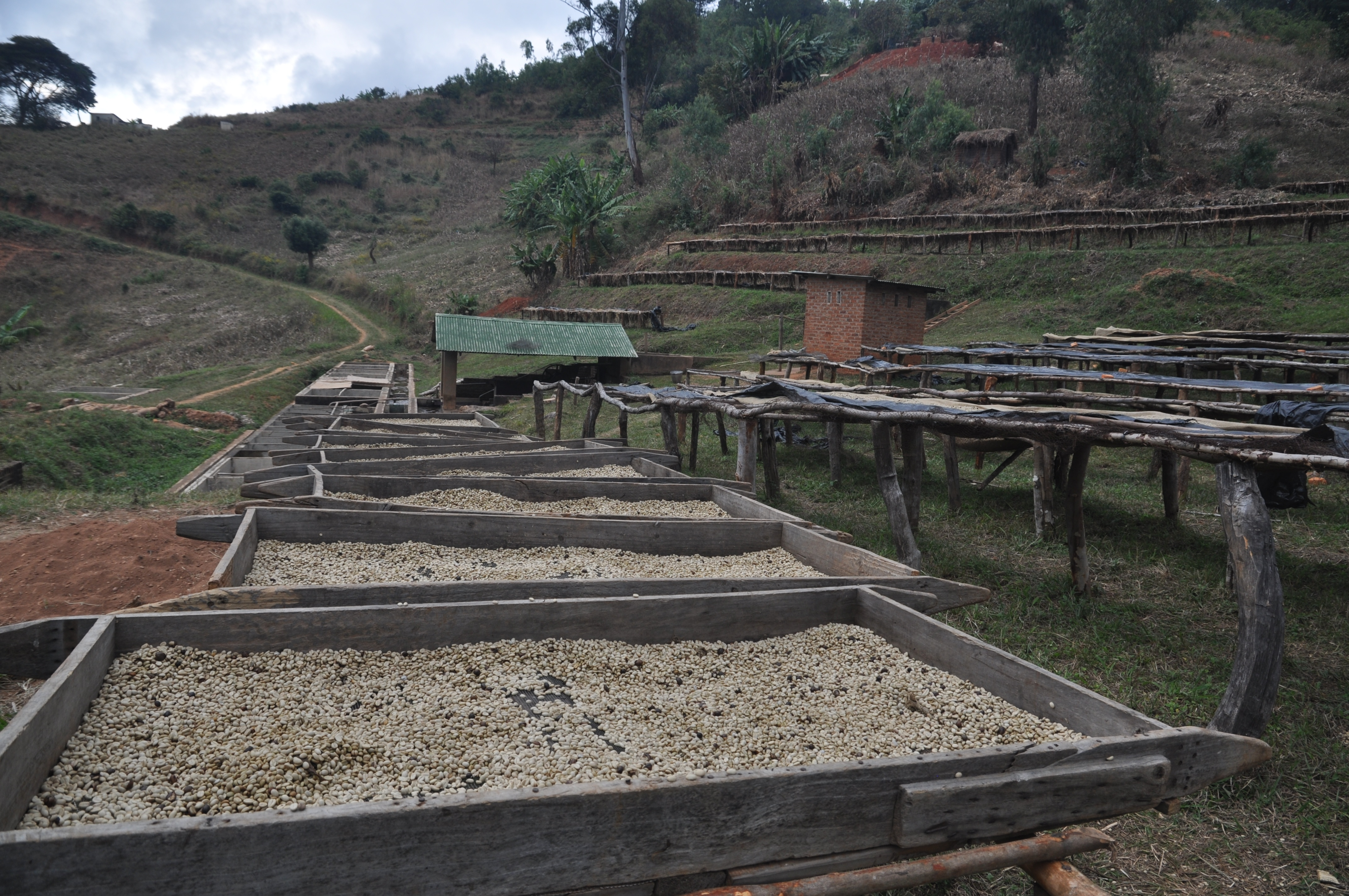
Caffè in essicazione (Malawi)

Drought and heavy rains pose challenges for Malawi, disrupting conventional farming practices and posing a threat to crop yields. As a response, farming families are implementing adaptive measures to address climate change, emphasizing the importance of resilience in the agriculture sector. Both droughts and floods have the potential to devastate crops and soil, which in turn jeopardizes farmers' harvests and agricultural sustainability. The rise in temperatures contributes to increased evapotranspiration and decreased soil moisture, having a detrimental impact on maize farming and food security. Climate change projections indicate that there will be changes in the suitability of crops, which will affect both staple and cash crops in Malawi. Moreover, Malawi is witnessing a rise in the frequency and intensity of climate-related events, further exacerbating the impact on the agriculture sector. Climate change results in a reduction in the availability of feed and forage, thereby impacting the nutritional resources for livestock. The Alterations in temperature and precipitation patterns give rise to water scarcity, thereby affecting the availability of water for livestock. The Escalating temperatures contribute to heat stress in livestock, thereby impacting their health and productivity. Climate change influences the prevalence of livestock diseases, thereby presenting additional challenges to animal health. In Malawi, climate change poses a significant threat to food security, necessitating farming families to adapt their production methods to mitigate the impacts of the changing climate.

== Mitigation and adaptations ==
In 2013, Malawi drafted a National Climate Change Policy intending to guide actions to reduce vulnerability to climate change for both humans and ecosystems. The policy focuses on adaptation and mitigation, technology transfer, and capacity building. In terms of mitigation, Malawi is committed to improving land use, implementing climate-smart agriculture, promoting renewable energy, utilizing the Clean Development Mechanism and voluntary carbon markets, as well as implementing REDD+.

== Notable people ==
- Gloria Majiga-Kamoto
- Anita Chitaya
- Dr Tonthoza Uganja

== See also ==
- Climate change in Africa
- Effects of climate change on agriculture
- Climate change adaptation
- Agriculture in Malawi
- Geography of Malawi
- Health in Malawi
- Climate change in Tanzania
- Climate change in Zambia
- Climate change in Mozambique
- Climate Change in Eritrea
- Climate change in Uganda
