= Gloria Majiga-Kamoto =

Malawian environmental activist

Gloria Majiga
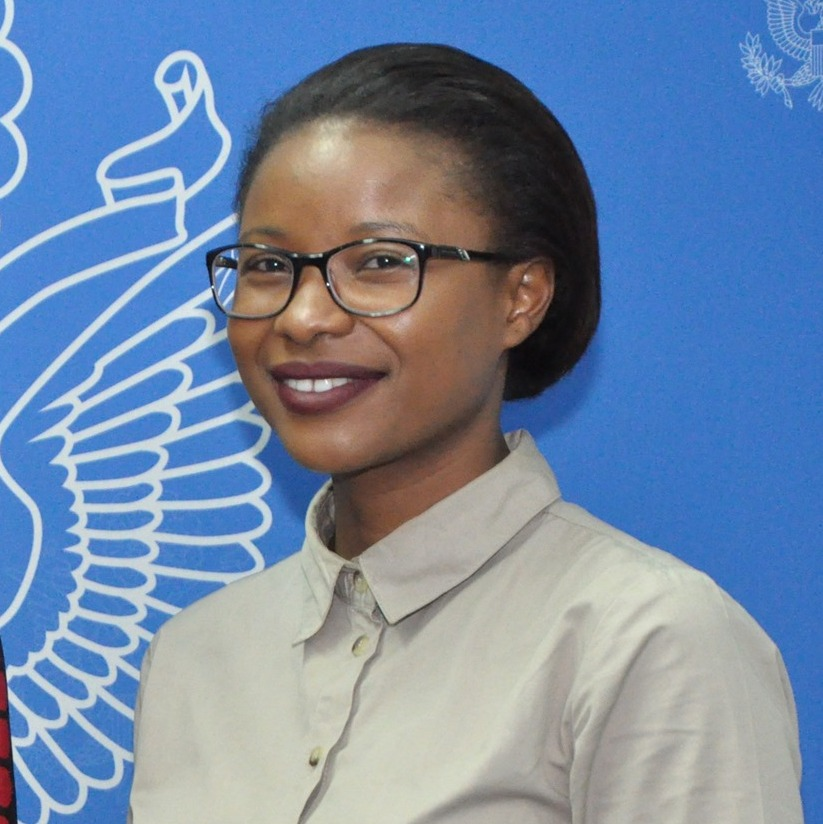
- in 2019
- Born: 1991 (age 34–35); Malawi
- Citizenship: Malawi
- Education: University of Malawi (Bachelor of Science); University of London (Master of Laws)
- Years active: 2015–present
- Title: Program Manager at Centre for Environmental Policy and Advocacy (CEPA), Blantyre, Malawi.
- Children: 1

Gloria Majiga (born c. 1991) is a Malawian community development officer and environmental activist, who was awarded the 2021 Goldman Environmental Prize for Africa, in recognition of her work in advocating for the enforcement of a national ban on the importation, manufacture and distribution of single-use plastics in Malawi, in 2019.

== Background and education ==
Gloria was born in Malawi circa 1991. She attended Malawian elementary and secondary schools. She holds a bachelor's degree from the University of Malawi. She has enrolled in the Master of Laws degree program at the University of London, on scholarship from the Canon Collins Educational & Legal Assistance Trust.

== Career ==
Following completion of her undergraduate degree studies, Gloria was hired by Centre for Environmental Policy and Advocacy (CEPA), a non-government organisation based in Limbe, a suburb of Blantyre, the financial capital of Malawi.

She was put in charge of the "Sustainable Agriculture Lead Farmer Project" which included a "pass-on" programme for goats and other livestock. The programme donated a female goat to one farmer. When that female produced a kid, the farmer would pass on the goat to the next farmer and so on, until all the farmers in the cohort had goats.

However, the program was not progressing as planned. Some of the farmers lost their goats because they ingested plastic waste strewn around the Malawian countryside and died from intestinal obstruction as a result.

== Activism ==
Malawi has on its books a law passed in 2015, which prohibits the importation, manufacture and distribution of single-use plastic. However, the law was not being enforced. Attempts by Gloria and her fellow environmentalists to hold civil dialogue with plastics manufactures in Malawi were rebuffed. As of 2016, Malawian plastic manufacturers were producing 75,000 tons of plastic annually. Of this, 80 percent was single-use, which is difficult to recycle. Plastic waste was clogging waterways and when consumed by livestock, was killing some of the animals.

The association of plastic manufacturers sued the government, challenging the ban on single-use plastic. They won in the lower courts but the case was appealed to the country's Supreme Court. Gloria and her fellow environmentalists organized public demonstrations to highlight the "plastic problem" in the country. A study commissioned by the government of Malawi, documented that the country produces more plastic waste per capita, than any other country in sub-Saharan Africa.

Over a five-year period, the court case made it to the Supreme Court of Malawi. In July 2019, the Supreme Court ruled that the manufacture, marketing, sale and use of single-use plastic (60 microns or less) was illegal in Malawi. Since 2019, three factories have been shut down and the fourth had its manufacturing equipment impounded.

In 2022, she was reported to have used some of the prize money that she won to organize community cleanups in Blantyre, Malawi. She and fellow environmental activists then carried the plastic debris that they picked up back to the factories of the plastics manufacturers with the media in tow.

== Personal ==
Gloria Majiga is a mother to one son.

== See also ==
- Thai Van Nguyen
- Kimiko Hirata
- Maida Bilal
- Sharon Lavigne
