= Kruščica =

Kruščica (lit. 'small pear' in Serbo-Croatian) may refer to:

- Kruščica (Bela Crkva), a village in Banat, Serbia
- Kruščica (Arilje), a village in Serbia
- Kruščica, Kalinovik, a village in Bosnia and Herzegovina
- Kruščica, Konjic, a village in Bosnia and Herzegovina
- Kruščica (Jajce), a village in Bosnia and Herzegovina
- Kruščica, Montenegro, a village near Petnjica, Montenegro
- Kruščica (mountain), a mountain in central Bosnia
- Kruščica (river), a river in central Bosnia, tributary of Lašva
- Kruščica (lake), a lake in Kosinj, Croatia
- Kruščica, Croatia, a village near Gospić
- Kruščica concentration camp
- Kruščica, a hamlet of Tribanj, Croatia

== See also ==
- Krušćica (disambiguation)
