= Climate action in Malawi =

Climate change mitigation and adaptation initiatives in Malawi

Climate action in Malawi refers to the suite of policies, initiatives and projects by the Government of Malawi and its international partners to mitigate greenhouse gas emissions and strengthen resilience to climate change impacts.

== Policy framework ==
Under its updated Nationally Determined Contribution (NDC) submitted in July 2021, Malawi commits to a 6% economy-wide reduction in greenhouse gas emissions unconditionally and an additional 45% conditional on international support by 2040.

=== Article 6 market mechanisms ===
In July 2023, UNDP Malawi convened over 50 government, private sector and regional delegates in Lilongwe to operationalize Article 6 of the Paris Agreement, enabling Malawi to trade internationally transferred mitigation outcomes and attract private climate finance.

== Key initiatives ==
=== Ecosystems-based Adaptation (EbAM) ===
On 9 December 2024, FAO and the Government of Malawi launched the US$53.2 million “Ecosystems-based Adaptation for Resilient Watersheds and Communities in Malawi (EbAM)” project to restore 83,000 ha of degraded land and improve food and water security for over 500,000 people.

=== Climate-health surveillance ===
A USD 37 million programme—backed by the Green Climate Fund, the Government of Malawi and Save the Children UK—will equip one-fifth of southern Malawi's population with an Early Warning and Response System (EWARS) to forecast outbreaks of malaria, diarrhoea and other climate-sensitive diseases and trigger community-level responses.

== Adaptation and innovation ==
Malawian farmers in Salima and Zomba districts have adopted solar-powered irrigation pumps and fish-storage dams to reduce reliance on erratic rainfall and buffer drought impacts. In northern Malawi, women's cooperatives ferment overripe bananas—whose spoilage has risen under changing rainfall patterns—into banana wine, diversifying incomes and enhancing community resilience.

== International cooperation ==
Malawi relies heavily on bilateral and multilateral climate finance for adaptation. In March 2025, the abrupt termination of a US$22.1 million USAID-backed forest protection and clean-cooking project left communities in Salima with unprotected woodlands and increased vulnerability to drought.

== Challenges and impacts ==
Prolonged droughts and successive cyclones have exacerbated food insecurity. Smallholder farmers report that “nothing grows anymore” and daily access to sufficient food has become a struggle.

In March 2023, Cyclone Freddy —the longest-recorded tropical cyclone— devastated southern Malawi, displacing over 650,000 people, destroying 20,000 households in Nsanje District and causing more than US$500 million in damages.

== See also ==
- Climate change in Malawi
