= Climate change in Eritrea =

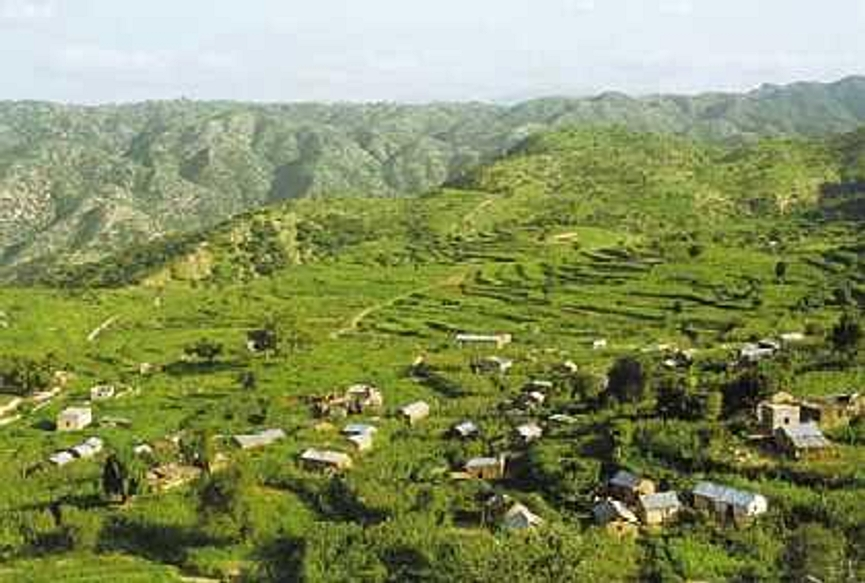
Agricultural land in Eritrea

Eritrea, a small coastal nation situated along the Red Sea in the Horn of Africa, is one of the most vulnerable countries of the world to the adverse effects of climate change and increased climate variability has already been evidenced in the country.

== Greenhouse gas emissions ==
Eritrea's CO_{2} emissions in 2020 were 6,242.49 thousand metric tons, showing a 1.02% increase from 2019. Fossil CO_{2} emissions in Eritrea were 684,140 tons in 2016. CO_{2} emissions increased by 4.79% over the previous year, representing an increase of 31,259 tons over 2015, when CO_{2} emissions were 652,881 tons.

Fossil Carbon Dioxide (CO_{2}) emissions of Eritrea
Year	Fossil CO_{2} Emissions ( tons )	CO2 emissions change	CO2 emissions per capita	Population	Pop . change	Share of World's CO2 emissions
2016	684,140	4.79%	0.2	3,365,287	0.76%	0.00%
2015	652,881	1.00%	0.2	3,340,006	0.50%	0.00%
2014	646,425	3.27%	0.19	3,323,425	0.82%	0.00%
2013	625,969	-0.02%	0.19	3,296,367	1.35%	0.00%
2012	626,081	6.35%	0.19	3,252,596	1.40%	0.00%
2011	588,706	16.82%	0.18	3,207,570	1.90%	0.00%
2010	503,931	7.04%	0.16	3,147,727	2.07%	0.00%
2009	470,807	4.52%	0.15	3,083,888	2.60%	0.00%
2008	450,425	-12.92%	0.15	3,005,779	2.72%	0.00%
2007	517,249	-2.10%	0.18	2,926,168	1.60%	0.00%
2006	528,326	-12.72%	0.18	2,880,093	1.71%	0.00%
2005	605,323	-12.00%	0.21	2,831,732	2.48%	0.00%
2004	687,836	-1.12%	0.25	2,763,140	4.14%	0.00%
2003	695,598	-3.08%	0.26	2,653,390	4.16%	0.00%
2002	717,682	-1.85%	0.28	2,547,424	3.47%	0.00%
2001	731,240	9.70%	0.3	2,461,927	2.89%	0.00%
2000	666,570	-1.34%	0.28	2,392,880	1.54%	0.00%
1999	675,620	6.25%	0.29	2,356,477	1.45%	0.00%
1998	635,905	-24.27%	0.27	2,322,753	1.36%	0.00%
1997	839,751	-5.16%	0.37	2,291,561	1.21%	0.00%
1996	885,425	10.07%	0.39	2,264,073	4.95%	0.00%
1995	804,439	8.98%	0.37	2,157,220	5.62%	0.00%
1994	738,126	12.84%	0.36	2,042,500	3.08%	0.00%
1993	654,162	40.83%	0.33	1,981,419	3.14%	0.00%
1992	464,507	861.68%	0.24	1,921,153	-5.79%	0.00%
1991	48,302	1.06%	0.02	2,039,220	-5.15%	0.00%
1990	47,795	3.89%	0.02	2,149,960	2.28%	0.00%
1989	46,007	1.00%	0.02	2,102,131	2.47%	0.00%
1988	45,550	3.07%	0.02	2,051,546	2.56%	0.00%
1987	44,193	-10.20%	0.02	2,000,355	2.60%	0.00%
1986	49,213	5.15%	0.03	1,949,611	2.65%	0.00%
1985	46,804	6.92%	0.02	1,899,243	2.68%	0.00%
1984	43,776	-0.28%	0.02	1,849,594	2.77%	0.00%
1983	43,900	2.33%	0.02	1,799,814	2.79%	0.00%
1982	42,902	0.37%	0.02	1,751,045	2.77%	0.00%
1981	42,744	0.49%	0.03	1,703,789	2.76%	0.00%
1980	42,537	-11.77%	0.03	1,657,982	2.74%	0.00%
1979	48,214	12.58%	0.03	1,613,829	2.71%	0.00%
1978	42,826	4.97%	0.03	1,571,193	2.71%	0.00%
1977	40,797	2.56%	0.03	1,529,802	2.69%	0.00%
1976	39,780	6.57%	0.03	1,489,656	2.67%	0.00%
1975	37,327	-12.81%	0.03	1,450,867	2.66%	0.00%
1974	42,812	2.11%	0.03	1,413,220	2.67%	0.00%
1973	41,927	2.63%	0.03	1,376,516	2.66%	0.00%
1972	40,852	-5.03%	0.03	1,340,838	2.65%	0.00%

== Climatology ==
The climate of Eritrea exhibits a diverse range of conditions, characterized by hot and arid regions near the Red Sea, temperate climates in the highlands, and sub-humid conditions in isolated micro-catchment areas along the eastern escarpment. Approximately 71% of the country experiences hot to very hot weather, with an average annual temperature exceeding 27 °C. Another 24% of the nation is warm to mild weather, with mean temperatures hovering around 22 °C. The remaining 5% of Eritrea's territory is of a cool climate, showcasing an average annual temperature below 19 °C. Rainfall distribution also varies significantly, with precipitation increasing as one moves from north to south. In the northwest lowlands, rainfall barely exceeds 200 mm annually, while the south-western lowlands receive more than 700 mm of rainfall per year. Overall, Eritrea is predominantly arid, with approximately 70% of its land area classified as such and average annual rainfall of less than 350 mm.

Current/past Köppen climate classification map for Eritrea up to 2018

Predicted Köppen climate classification map for Eritrea

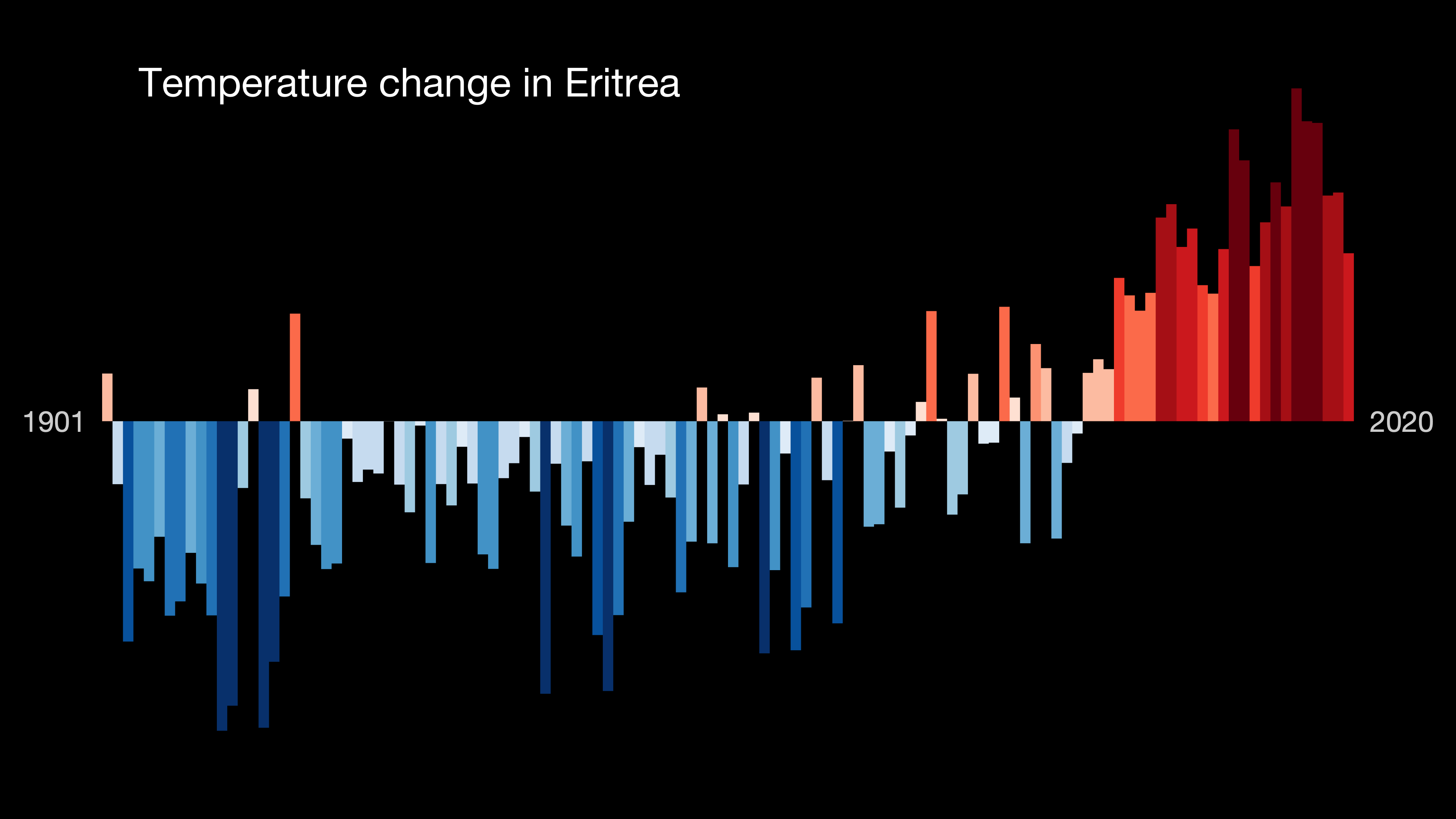
This bar chart is a visual representation of the change in temperature in the past 100+ years. Each stripe represents the temperature averaged over a year. The average temperature in 1971–2000 is set as the boundary between blue and red colors, and the color scale varies from ±2.6 standard deviations of the annual average temperatures between the years mentioned in the file name. Data source: Berkeley Earth. For more information visit https://showyourstripes.info/faq

== Climate Change Impacts ==
=== Temperature and weather changes ===
Since the 1960s, there has been an increase in temperature of approximately 1.7 °C, with an average rate of 0.37 °C per decade. Eastern Africa, including Eritrea, has witnessed a more frequent occurrence of extreme precipitation changes, such as droughts and heavy rainfall events, during the past 30–60 years. An analysis of data from 1912-2005 also indicates a decline in rainfall for the central and southern highlands, where rain-fed agriculture prevails as the dominant economic activity.

=== Impact on water resource ===
Current climate change projections suggest that the Anseba River's base flows and the shallow groundwater along the stream bank will be significantly impacted. As highlighted in the NAPA report, it is anticipated that rising temperatures and increasing rainfall variability will lead to a decline in overall groundwater supply and an elevated demand for crop water.

=== Impact on people ===
The escalating impacts of climate change, including droughts and frequent drought-related crises, have led to displacement and increased vulnerability among communities in Eritrea. This has been particularly observed in at-risk communities.

=== Agriculture and livestock ===
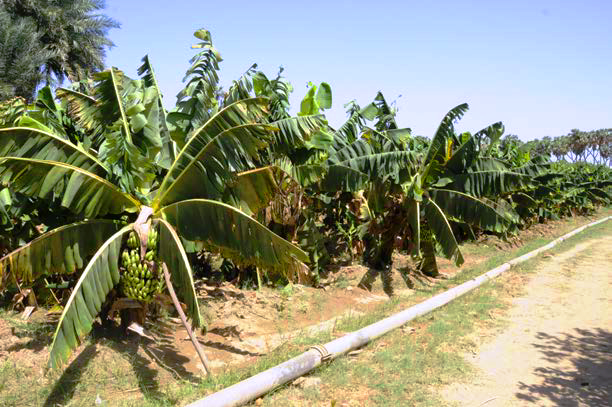
Eritrean-Banana Plantation

Over 70% of Eritrea’s population is reliant on agriculture, encompassing crop and livestock production, for their sustenance. Conversely, throughout most times of the year, the populace faces food insecurity due to the impacts of climate change and land degradation. Agriculture bears the brunt of capricious weather conditions and significant seasonal price fluctuations. Consequently, domestic food production consistently falls short of the country's requirements, necessitating a dependence on commercial imports. In recent times, Eritrea has also experienced volatile fluctuations in livestock production. These variations are ascribed to both factors influenced by human activities and the altering climate patterns. Scarcities of pastures and water sources, primarily triggered by climate change and the deterioration of land quality, further impede the livestock sector of the nation. Small-scale farmers play a dominant role in the agricultural sector, where they experience low agricultural productivity. These farmers are typically living in persistent poverty and heavily rely on rain-fed and traditional farming practices. As a result, these communities are exceedingly susceptible to the variability of climate change.

== Mitigation and Adaptation Strategies ==
Eritrea has implemented several policies and legal frameworks to contribute to both the adaptation and mitigation of climate change. The country has made significant strides in incorporating climate change considerations into its national development policy framework. Eritrea has already taken proactive measures to integrate climate change mitigation issues into sectoral policies, such as through the Energy Development Framework and Strategy (EDFS). In 2007, Eritrea launched its National Climate Change Adaptation Plan of Action (NAPA) which built on ongoing efforts to address climate change in the country’s development policy framework. The NAPA focuses on strengthening adaptation to climate change in five priority sectors, namely agriculture, forestry, water, marine and coastal environment, and public health.

Eritrea submitted its first Nationally Determined Contribution (NDC) to the UNFCCC in 2018, committing to reduce CO_{2} emissions from fossil fuels by 12% by 2030 compared to 2010 levels. With additional support, emissions can be reduced by 38.5% by 2030. The NDC outlines concrete measures for implementation, including capacity building, technology transfer, financial support, and partnerships with regional and international agencies. Monitoring and evaluation tools are proposed for effective implementation of the NDC.

In 2021, Eritrea submitted its First Biennial Update Report (BUR1) to the United Nations Framework Convention on Climate Change (UNFCCC). The country is also currently in the process of preparing its Third National Communication (TNC), Nationally Appropriate Mitigation Action (NAMA), and National Adaptation Plan (NAP) documents.

== See also ==
- Climate change in Africa
- Effects of climate change on agriculture
- Climate change adaptation
- Agriculture in Eritrea
- Geography of Eritrea
- Health in Eritrea
- Climate Change in Malawi
