= Agriculture in Eritrea =

Agriculture is one of the main economic activities in Eritrea. Agriculture made up 20% of the country its GDP in 2021. Eritrea has 565,000 hectares (1,396,000 acres) of arable land and permanent crops. 70% of the Eritrean workforce is employed in agriculture, accounting for roughly one-third of the economy. Eritrea's main agricultural products include sorghum, millet, barley, wheat, legumes, vegetables, fruits, sesame, linseed, cattle, sheep, goats, and camels.

== History ==
Agriculture in Eritrea has experienced extensive improvement over recent years. After the Eritrean War of Independence, agriculture was one of the many sectors that was completely destroyed. Since then, significant investments have been made into the industry—purchases worth millions of dollars of agricultural machinery have been made and hundreds of dams have been built.

== Agricultural products ==
Eritrea's main agricultural products include sorghum, millet, barley, wheat, legumes, vegetables, fruits, sesame, linseed, cattle, sheep, goats, and camels.

== Agricultural production ==
In 2018, Eritrea produced:

- 140 thousand tons of sorghum;
- 68 thousand tons of barley;
- 58 thousand tons of vegetable;
- 52 thousand tons of root and tubers;
- 31 thousand tons of cereal;
- 29 thousand tons of pulses;
- 28 thousand tons of wheat;
- 23 thousand tons of millet;
- 19 thousand tons of maize;
- 14 thousand tons of oilseeds,

in addition to smaller productions of other agricultural products.
