= Kimiko Hirata =

Japanese climate activist (born 1970)

- 平田 仁子
- Born: 1970 (age 55–56); Kumamoto prefecture, Japan
- Education: University of the Sacred Heart; Waseda University (Ph.D.)
- Organization(s): Climate Integrate; Kiko Network
- Awards: 2021 Goldman Environmental Prize

Kimiko Hirata (平田 仁子, Hirata Kimiko, born 1970) is a Japanese climate activist. As a founder of the Kiko Network, a non-governmental organization, she has campaigned for emissions reductions for more than 20 years. As of December 2022, her grassroots work has led to the cancellation of 17 planned coal-power plants. Hirata also led landmark coal divestment campaigns against Mizuho Financial Group and Mitsubishi UFJ. She currently serves as executive director for the Tokyo-based think tank, Climate Integrate, which focuses on accelerating decarbonization.

In 2021, Hirata became the first Japanese woman to be awarded the Goldman Environmental Prize, nicknamed the "Green Nobel". In 2022, she was named to the BBC 100 list of influential women. She holds a PhD in social sciences from Waseda University, and is the author of Climate Change and Politics (2019) in Japanese, and co-author of many books and articles.

== Education and early career ==
Hirata was born in southern Kumamoto prefecture, and studied education at university. She first became aware of the magnitude of climate change during the 1992 Rio de Janeiro Earth Summit, which was covered widely in the Japanese media, and started reading books including Earth in the Balance by Al Gore. She became interested in international activism while taking a course taught by Masako Hoshino, an activist who had helped to launch one of Japan's first NGOs.

After graduation, she went to work at a publisher of academic texts. She continued reading about environmental issues and studied English. In 1996, she left her job and moved to the United States for a one-year internship with the Climate Institute. During her year in the US, she also volunteered at the National Water Foundation and for a Smithsonian program focusing on biodiversity, and took a course on NGO management.

She earned a PhD at the Waseda University Graduate School of Social Sciences in 1999. In 2021, she was a visiting associate professor at the Chiba University of Commerce.

== Career as activist ==
In 1997, she returned to Japan to campaign at COP 3, where the Kyoto Protocol was adopted. She founded Kiko Network, an NGO focused on halting climate change, in 1998. Kiko Network emerged as one of the few organizations actively monitoring Japan's compliance with the Kyoto Protocol.

=== Fight against coal power ===
Following the March 2011 earthquake, tsunami, and nuclear disaster in Fukushima, the Japanese government shifted policy to allow new coal power plants to be built. Until then, nuclear reactors had generated roughly 30 percent of Japan's electricity, but were shut down by the government in the wake of the disaster. The Japanese public also grew deeply distrustful of nuclear energy. To address the ensuing energy crisis, the government solicited bids for additional coal-fired plants to be built, and by 2015, plans were in place for 50 new plants. Japan thus became the only G7 country planning new coal-fired power stations at the time.

Hirata realized that Kiko Network needed to shift its focus from policy-driven work to grassroots campaigning, and adopted a multi-pronged strategy to fight against coal. Kiko Network launched a website to track the proposed coal power projects nationwide. To raise awareness of the environmental and health hazards of coal power, Hirata worked in tandem with scientists, pollution experts, journalists, lawyers, and local community leaders, as well as other NGOs. In key areas where coal power projects were planned, she cultivated a network of local citizen activists, spoke at public hearings, and helped to drive unprecedented turnout at community forums.

She also enlisted support from international experts in analyzing the costs and risks associated with coal plants, and released their findings. Hirata worked with a researcher from Greenpeace on a report which found that the expected air pollution would lead to 1,000 premature deaths in Japan annually. In addition, the Sustainable Finance Program at Oxford University and Carbon Tracker conducted an investment risk analysis which made the case for canceling the planned coal plants as well as those under construction, and phasing out the existing fleet.

To put additional pressure on Japanese policymakers, Hirata collaborated with NGOs internationally, including the Climate Action Network, which gave Japan multiple "Fossil of the Day" awards for "'doing the most to achieve the least' in terms of the progress on climate change". The international outcry against Japan's coal policy was covered extensively by the Japanese media; Hirata coordinated protests at several COP meetings, and spoke to the press ahead of the G20 summits.

As of December 2022, Hirata's grassroots campaign calling attention to their potential impact in terms of air pollution and climate change had led to the cancellation of 17 out of 50 planned coal-power plants.

=== Coal divestment campaign ===
In 2020, Hirata spearheaded a shareholder campaign to force megabank Mizuho Financial Group, the world's largest private lender to coal developers, to tighten lending to coal companies. Proposed by Kiko Network with the backing of six Nordic funds in mid-March, it was the first shareholder-led climate-change resolution proposed for a listed company in Japan, and called for more climate change disclosures, as well as a plan with defined targets to bring its business in line with the Paris climate accord. One month after the motion was proposed, Mizuho announced that it would stop issuing loans to new coal plants in June of that year, and that it planned to exit coal investments by 2050; one day later, Sumitomo Mitsui Financial Group also announced that it would stop issuing loans to coal plants in May. Hirata responded that both initiatives fell short of compliance with the Paris Agreement. In June 2020, although the resolution did not pass, it secured higher-than-expected support, with 35 percent of Mizuho shareholders voting in favor.

In 2021, she campaigned for a similar climate resolution at Mitsubishi UFJ filed jointly by Kiko Group, Market Forces, the Rainforest Action Network, and 350.org Japan. The proposal requiring the bank to align its investments with the Paris climate accord won 23 percent of the shareholder vote.

As a result of Hirata's efforts in urging businesses to divest from coal, as of 2021, more than 10 major coal plant developers had announced that they would stop developing or financing new coal projects.

=== Decarbonization ===
Hirata stepped down as international director of Kiko Network in December 2021, although she remains on its board of directors. In January 2022, she established Climate Integrate to focus on accelerating decarbonization by working with partners in Japan and internationally. In July 2022, Climate Integrate released a report, "Getting Lost on the Road to Decarbonization: Japan's Big Plans for Ammonia".

== Personal life ==
Hirata lives in Tokyo with her husband and two children.
