= Climate change in Uganda =

Emissions, impacts and responses of Uganda related to climate change

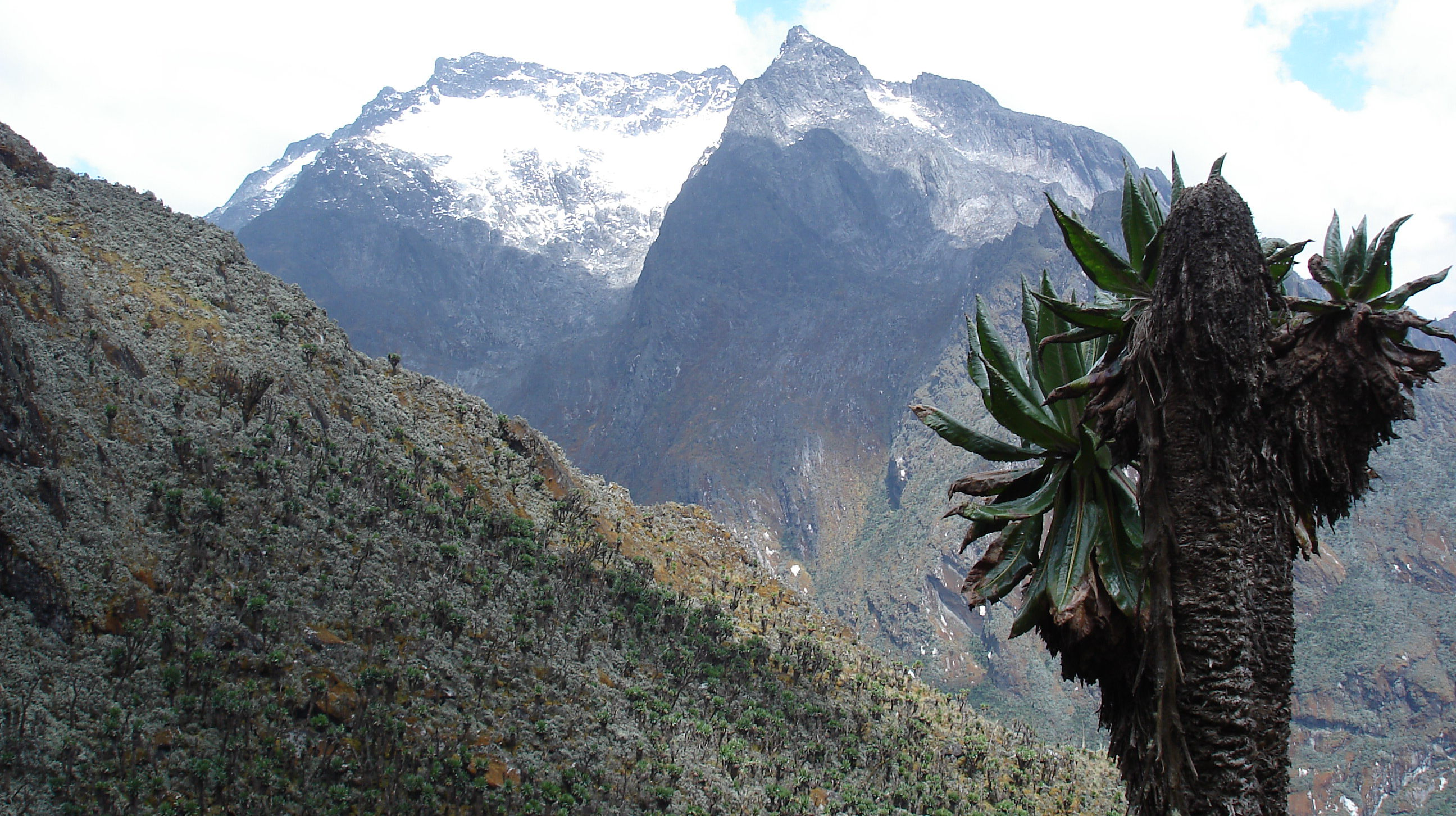
Glaciers on the Rwenzori Mountains, like these on Mount Speke, are melting due to climate change.

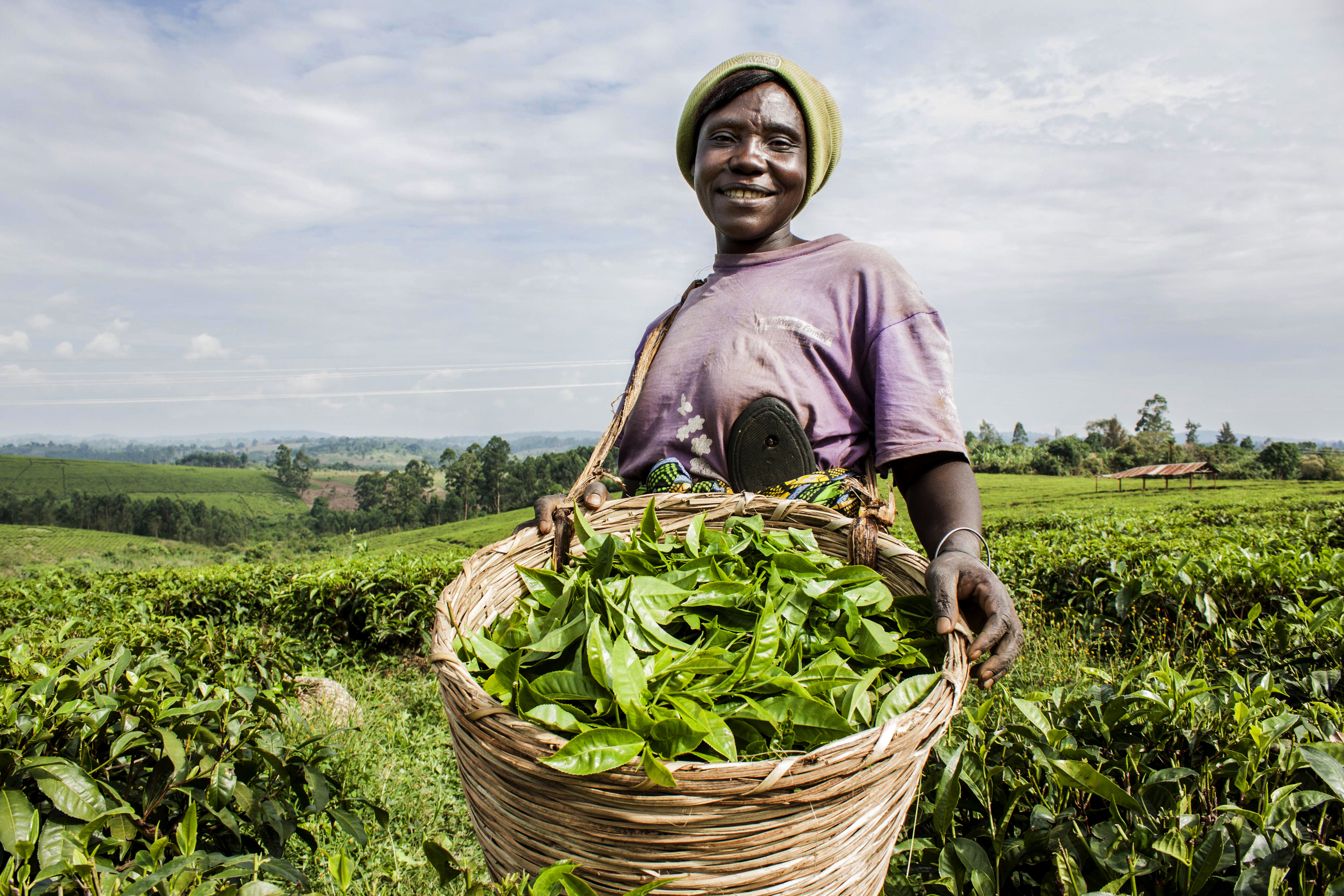
Tea plantation in Uganda

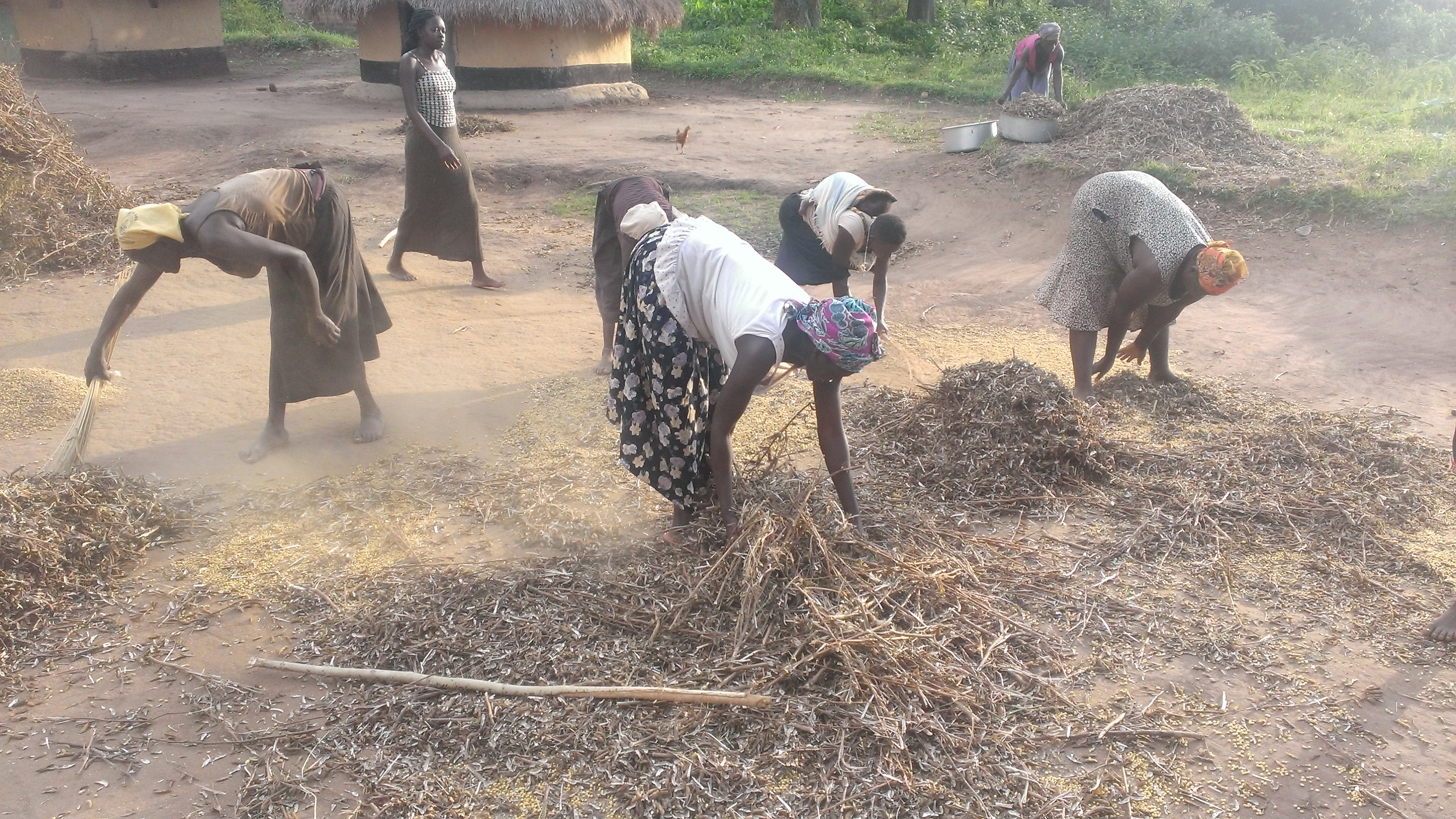
Women fighting food insecurity during harvests in dry season

The effects of climate change in Uganda are increasingly severe, affecting the lives of the country's citizens and its environment. It has led to extreme weather events such as unpredictable, prolonged drought and rainfall. Uganda's climate is mostly tropical with regular rainfall and sunshine patterns. Due to climate change the seasons have changed, with the rainy season becoming more variable in length and droughts more ubiquitous, especially in eastern and northeastern Uganda. Climate trends have the potential to affect development of Uganda, due to the vulnerability of Uganda's diverse environment.

== Greenhouse gas emissions ==
Uganda's greenhouse gas emission rate is very low, with carbon dioxide having never exceeding 150 kg per person per year, and totaling about 5 million tonnes per year. As of 2022, over 90% of Uganda's electricity comes from hydroelectricity, but many rural areas lack electricity and burn wood for cooking. The government has been criticized for causing deforestation.

Fossil Carbon Dioxide (CO2) emissions of Uganda.
Year	Fossil CO2 emissions (tons)	CO2 emissions change	CO2 emissions per capita	Population	Pop. change	Share of World's CO2 emissions
2022	7,540,270	2.33%	0.16	47,312,719	3.05%	0.020%
2021	7,368,890	9.59%	0.16	45,910,930	3.27%	0.019%
2020	6,723,890	−2.45%	0.15	44,457,152	3.39%	0.019%
2019	6,892,820	2.77%	0.16	42,999,637	3.45%	0.018%
2018	6,707,280	11.77%	0.16	41,565,831	3.46%	0.018%
2017	6,000,700	3.99%	0.15	40,177,388	3.55%	0.016%
2016	5,770,670	7.37%	0.15	38,799,152	3.38%	0.016%
2015	5,374,730	15.98%	0.14	37,531,446	3.12%	0.015%
2014	4,634,070	10.02%	0.13	36,395,539	3%	0.013%
2013	4,211,990	1.39%	0.12	35,337,042	2.91%	0.012%
2012	4,154,110	1.52%	0.12	34,337,438	2.95%	0.012%
2011	4,091,900	11.94%	0.12	33,354,543	2.98%	0.012%
2010	3,655,600	−1.32%	0.11	32,390,802	2.99%	0.011%
2009	3,704,420	10.37%	0.12	31,451,151	2.98%	0.012%
2008	3,356,400	8.03%	0.11	30,539,553	2.99%	0.010%
2007	3,107,030	20.6%	0.1	29,653,430	2.98%	0.0097%
2006	2,576,410	16.06%	0.09	28,794,003	2.97%	0.0083%
2005	2,219,830	22.61%	0.08	27,963,289	2.98%	0.0074%
2004	1,810,500	4.68%	0.07	27,154,515	3.04%	0.0063%
2003	1,729,540	5.66%	0.07	26,352,124	3.21%	0.0063%
2002	1,636,940	13.98%	0.06	25,532,870	3.18%	0.0062%
2001	1,436,180	1.7%	0.06	24,745,676	3.11%	0.0055%
2000	1,412,130	1.17%	0.06	24,000,150	3.19%	0.0055%
1999	1,395,740	2.92%	0.06	23,257,281	3.29%	0.0056%
1998	1,356,190	16.84%	0.06	22,515,806	3.02%	0.0055%
1997	1,160,720	5.08%	0.05	21,856,046	2.94%	0.0047%
1996	1,104,560	9.18%	0.05	21,231,550	2.74%	0.0046%
1995	1,011,690	29.52%	0.05	20,665,667	2.77%	0.0043%
1994	781,120	−9.81%	0.04	20,108,801	3.41%	0.0034%
1993	866,080	0.77%	0.04	19,445,161	3.51%	0.0038%
1992	859,460	1.78%	0.05	18,785,032	3.47%	0.0038%
1991	844,390	1.7%	0.05	18,155,901	3.34%	0.0037%
1990	830,260	17.87%	0.05	17,569,897	3.29%	0.0037%
1989	704,360	−5.97%	0.04	17,010,698	3.28%	0.0032%
1988	749,080	7.85%	0.05	16,470,483	3.24%	0.0034%
1987	694,580	11.72%	0.04	15,954,170	3.15%	0.0033%
1986	621,710	10.05%	0.04	15,467,579	2.95%	0.0030%
1985	564,950	3.85%	0.04	15,023,681	2.85%	0.0028%
1984	544,020	3.91%	0.04	14,607,677	2.71%	0.0027%
1983	523,540	−4.37%	0.04	14,221,881	2.51%	0.0027%
1982	547,490	−6.21%	0.04	13,873,631	2.34%	0.0029%
1981	583,710	−18.64%	0.04	13,556,452	2.11%	0.0030%
1980	717,400	−6.29%	0.05	13,275,741	2.1%	0.0036%
1979	765,540	3.07%	0.06	13,002,163	2.44%	0.0038%
1978	742,770	−21.99%	0.06	12,692,113	2.69%	0.0038%
1977	952,120	−6.88%	0.08	12,359,669	2.68%	0.0050%

== Impact on the natural environment ==
=== Temperature and weather changes ===
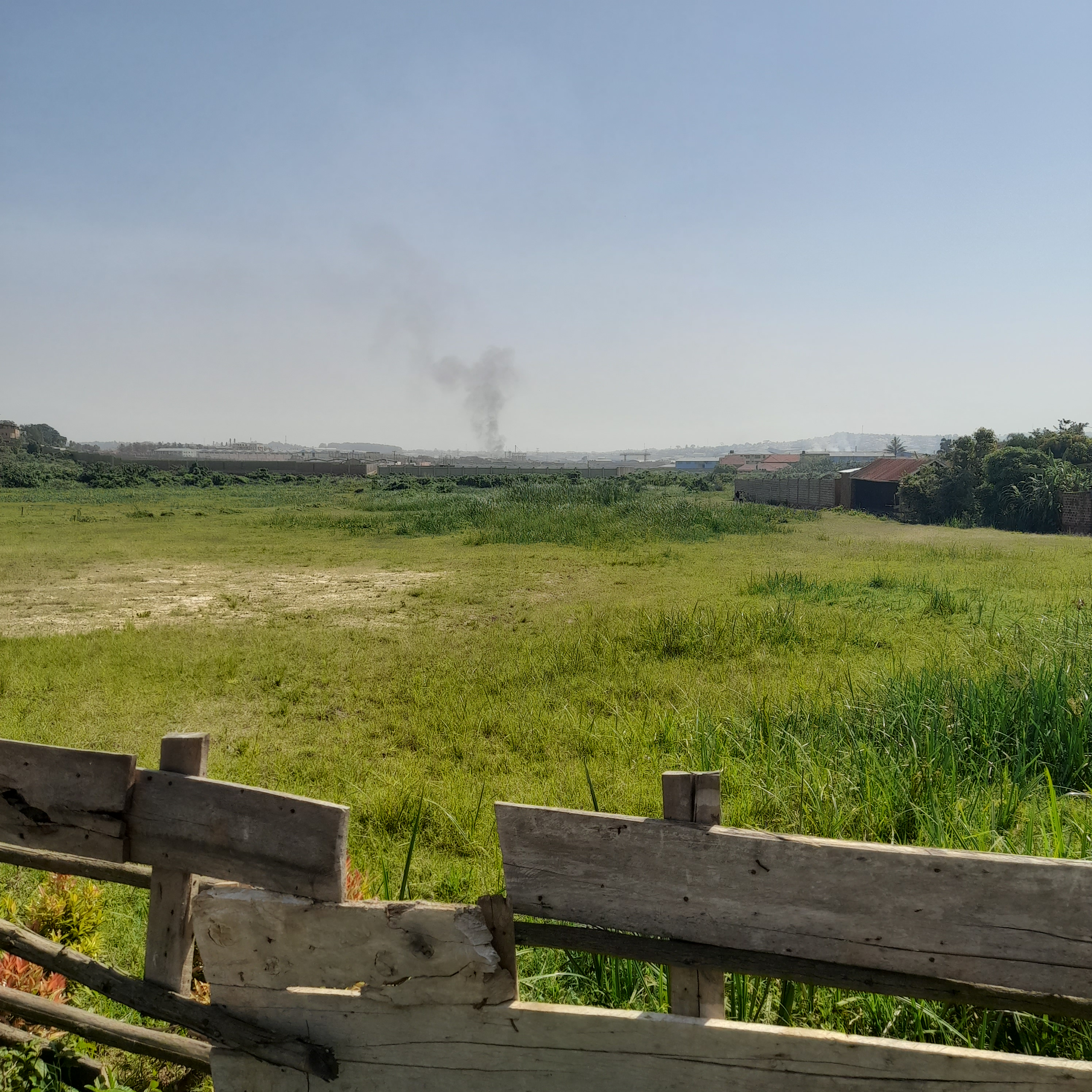
Namanve forest area that was cleared for industrialisation

Since the 1960s, the average temperature in Uganda has increased by 1.3 °C, minimum temperatures have increased by 0.5–1.2 °C, and maximum temperatures have increased by 0.6–0.9 °C. Average temperatures have been observed to be increasing at a rate of 0.28 °C per decade, and daily temperature observations show significantly increasing amounts of hot days and nights every year . Climate change and changes in temperature is also affecting the Rwenzori Mountains, by causing glacier melting, increasing water levels in the Nyamwamba, Mubuku, and Ruimi Rivers. This has led to frequent flooding across the Rwenzori region. From 1906 to 2003, ice fields shrunk from 6.5 sq km to less than 1 sq km, and may completely melt in the next few years. In 2012, forest fires occurred in the Rwenzori region, causing the ice fields to melt, leading to the flooding of the river around the mountain.

In January 2022, intense rain around Mount Muhavura damaged buildings and roads in Kisoro District, especially affecting Nyarusiza, Muramba and Bunagana. Nine people were reported to have lost their lives and thousands of people were displaced or otherwise affected by this disaster.

On 1 March 2010, landslides occurred on the slopes of Mount Elgon, in the Bududa district, that killed 50 people and left thousands displaced. In 2018, there was another landslide on Mount Elgon, that killed 28 people, and left thousands displaced once again. As of 30 September 2021, a total of 20,739 people had been internally displaced. All landslides were caused by unusually prolonged rains.

Köppen climate classification map for Uganda for 1980–2016

2071–2100 map under the most intense climate change scenario. Mid-range scenarios are currently considered more likely

In Kasese District, there is flooding almost every year, which causes a heavy impact on the lives and livelihood of residents. As a result, many schools and homes are buried or destroyed, leaving many displaced.

On Saturday 30 July 2022 at around 8pm EAT in the evening, there was a down pour of rain that took several hours up to around 7am EAT in the morning of Sunday 31 July 2022 in Mbale district, Sebei region and part of

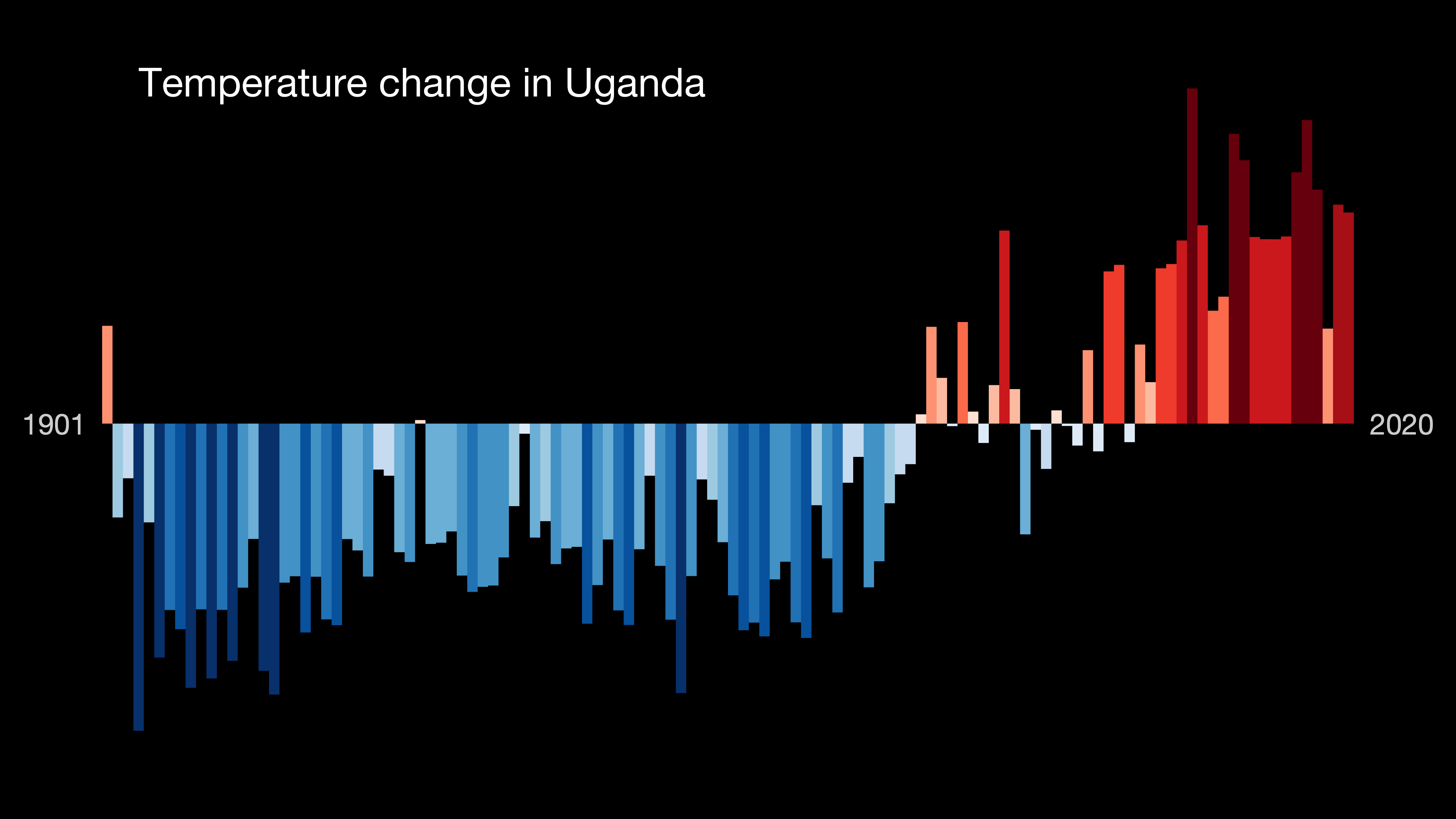
This bar chart is a visual representation of the change in temperature in the past 100+ years. Each stripe represents the temperature averaged over a year. The average temperature in 1971–2000 is set as the boundary between blue and red colors, and the color scale varies from ±2.6 standard deviations of the annual average temperatures between the years mentioned in the file name. Data source: Berkeley Earth. For more information visit https://showyourstripes.info/faq

Teso region. This caused river Nabuyonga and river Namatala to burst the banks causing floods and landslides in Mbale district, Kapsinda Sub-county, Kapchorwa District. This led to a death toll of 24 in Mbale alone as of 2 August 2022, more bodies were recovered on that day. In Mbale, most of the affected areas were Mbale City, Nabuyonga, Nkoma and Namakwekwe in Northern City Division and Namatala in Industrial City Division.

In August 2025, severe flash floods hit Mbale City and Sironko District in eastern Uganda, resulting in the deaths of at least three people, the displacement of hundreds, and widespread damage to infrastructure. Triggered by heavy rainfall, key bridges including the Nalugugu and Nabuyonga bridges were destroyed, cutting off major transport routes between the Bugisu, Sebei, and Karamoja sub-regions. Homes and plantations were submerged as rivers such as Nabuyonga and Nalugugu burst their banks. Among the victims were a schoolteacher, a teenage boy, and a young man who died while attempting a rescue. Local authorities reported that several communities remained isolated, with rescue operations and damage assessments ongoing.

=== Impact on water resources ===
Ugandan water supply and the sanitation sector has made substantial progress in urban areas from the mid-1990s until at least 2006, with substantial increases in coverage. Reforms from 1998 to 2003 included the commercialization and modernization of the National Water and Sewerage Corporation (NWSC) operating in cities and larger towns, as well as decentralization and private sector participation in small towns. Uganda has renewable water resources totalling to 2085 cubic meters per year, which is above the limit recognized internationally of 100 m^{3}/year of water scarcity. Nevertheless, the water sector is developed and only about 0.5% of the total available water is utilized per year.

Available renewable water utilization in Uganda
Sector	%
Agriculture	40
Municipal and industrial	43
Consumption	17

Uganda has made some progress and improvements in water supply through improving facilities, increasing from 39% availability in 1990 to 48% in 2008, and, in remote and rural areas, from 40% in 1990 to 49% in 2008. This was not the case with the urban areas, which only increased from 35% in 1995 to 38% in 2008.

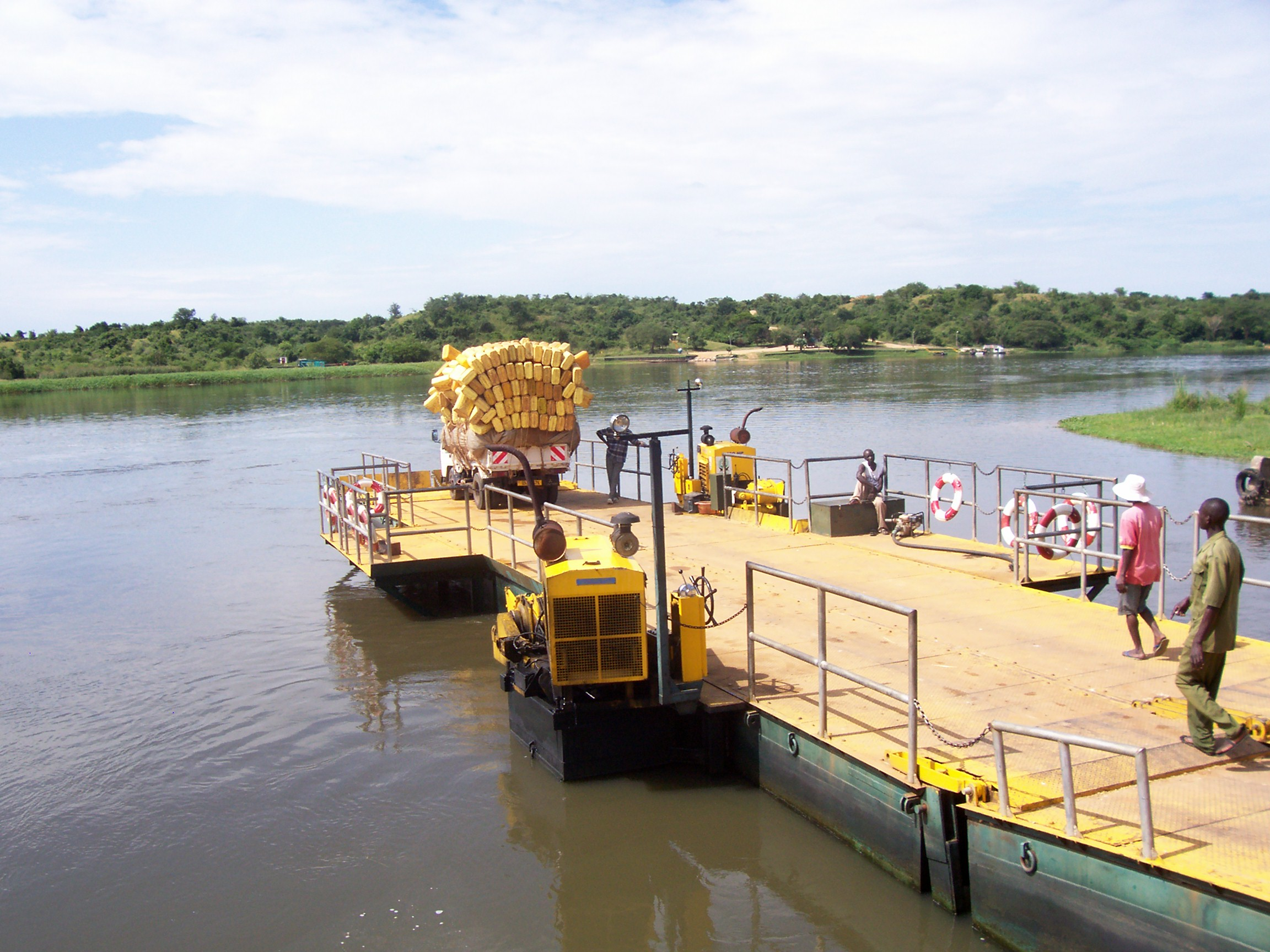
The White Nile in Uganda

=== Ecosystems ===
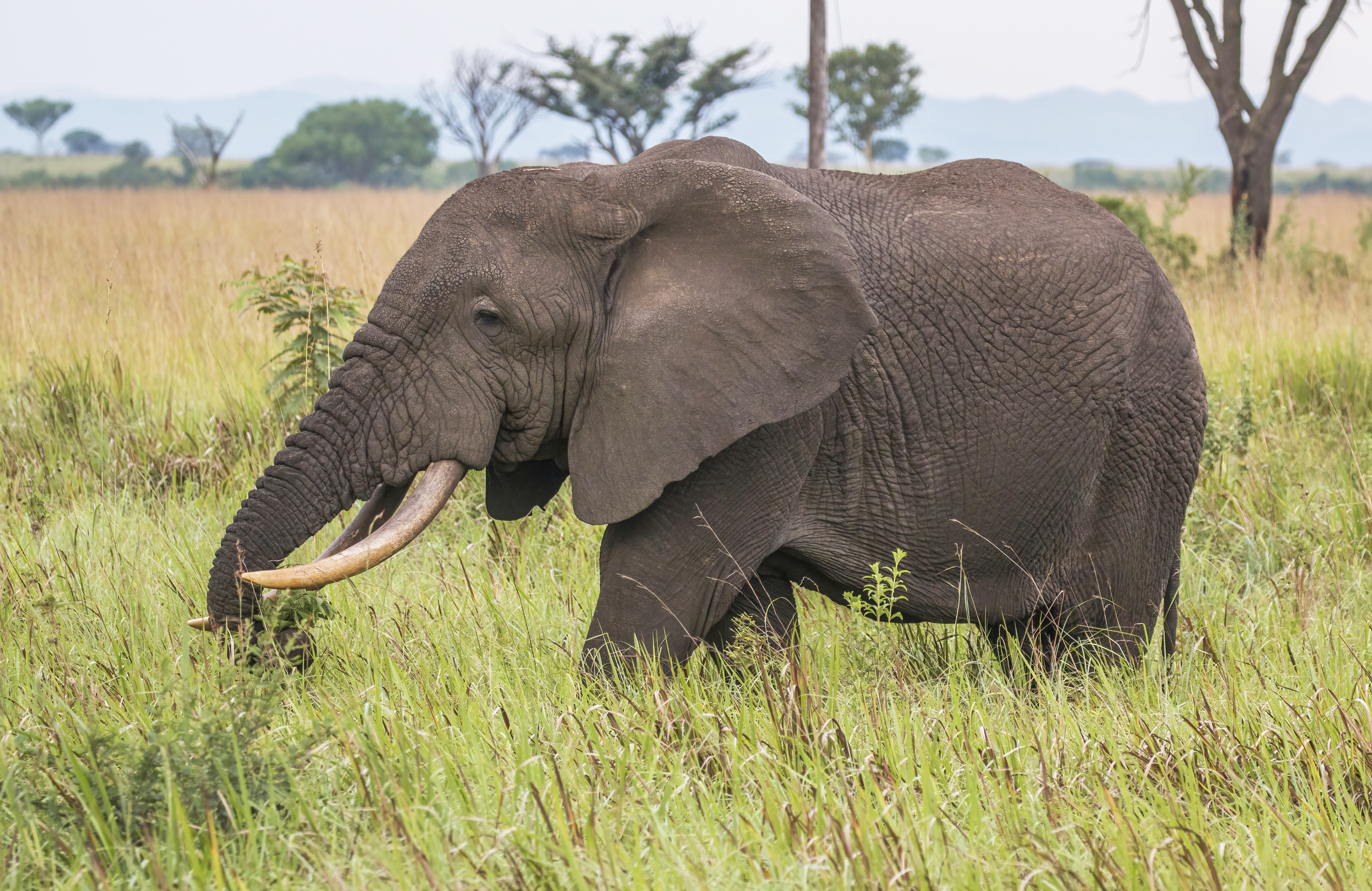

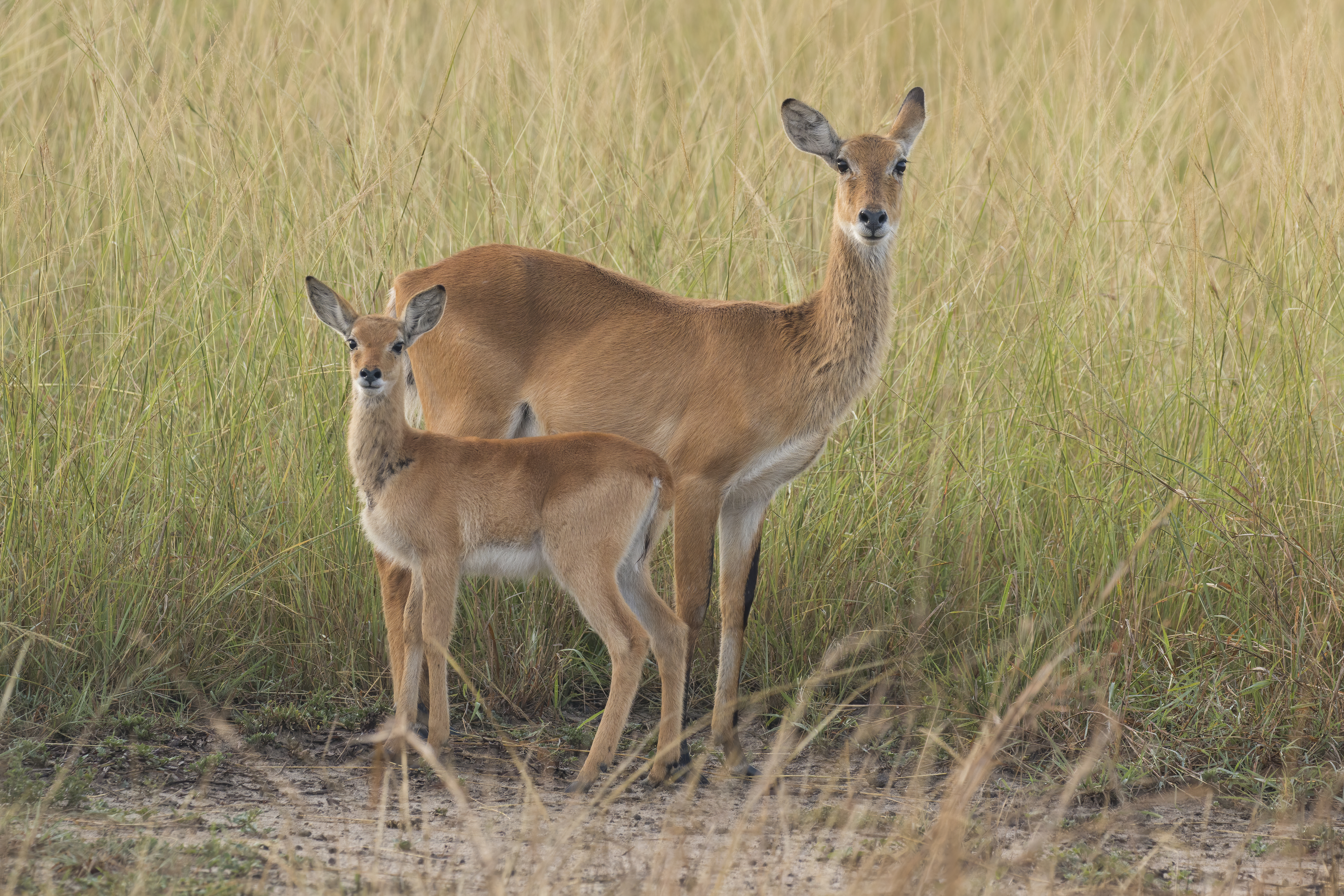
Wildlife in Ugandan ecosystems includes the African elephant and Ugandan kob

In 2010, Uganda had 6.93 Mha of tree cover, extending over 29% of its land area. In 2020, it lost 73.6 kha of tree cover, equivalent to 36.0 Mt of CO_{2} emissions. From 2001 to 2020, 918 kha of tree cover was lost, equivalent to a 12% decrease in tree cover since 2000 and 413 Mt of CO_{2} emissions. From 2001 to 2019, 3.8% of tree cover loss occurred in areas where dominant drivers resulted in deforestation. This has reduced both the ecosystem services the forests provide, including by diminishing wood yield and quality, and the biodiversity they support. 1.4 Mha of land has been burned, as of 2021. This total is normal, compared to the total for previous years, going back to 2001. The most fires recorded in a year was 2005, with 7.3 Mha burnt.

== Impact on people ==
=== Economic impacts ===
Uganda's economy consists of three major sectors, agriculture, industry, and services, all of which are highly vulnerable to the effects of climate change. Climate change is affecting the agricultural sector by reducing the area suitable for agriculture due to population growth, altering the length of the growing season, reducing yield potential, increasing the frequency and severity of extreme events (in particular droughts and floods), and increasing the incidence of plant diseases.

Climate change damage estimates in the agriculture, water, infrastructure and energy sectors collectively amount to 2–4% of the GDP between 2010 and 2050. With an estimated population of 48,432,863, Uganda is the leading country of organic farming, with an estimate of 231,157 hectares of land used for farming.

==== Agriculture and livestock ====
Climate change has affected agriculture, which is the most important sector of the economy. Most of the production is from small scale farmers. Average temperatures range between 18 and 30 °C, but it can raise to about 37 °C in some areas.

=== Health impacts ===
A 2020 report warned that climate change was expecting to increase health risks in Uganda through more frequent and intense droughts, floods and shifting rainfall patterns. Flooding can pollute sources of drinking water with pathogens and other contaminants that can lead to water-related diseases such as typhoid and cholera. Droughts can reduce access to safe water. Heavy rainfall can create standing water, which provides breeding sites for mosquitoes and can increase the spread of vector-borne diseases such as malaria. The report also cited reduced availability of herbal medicines, decline in biodiversity contributing to malnutrition, and an increase in pests as direct health effects of climate change.

Many climate policies list health as a priority but fall short in articulating how health impacts will be systematically addressed and measured. Implementation of Uganda’s climate-health policies is hindered by inadequate funding, fragmented coordination between government sectors, and limited capacity at the local level.

== Mitigation and adaptations ==
A number of government agencies have been tasked with, or have prepared reports, on managing climate resilience, including the National Environmental Management Authority (NEMA), the Ministry of Water and Environment's Climate Change Department, the National Forestry Authority, the Ministry of Lands, Housing & Urban Development, the Ministry of Works and Transport, and the Uganda Wildlife Authority.

Many climate policies list health as a priority but fall short in articulating how health impacts will be systematically addressed and measured. Some health-relevant issues, such as WASH, are often categorised under other sectors, limiting opportunities for integrated monitoring of health outcomes. Currently, climate change and adaptation lie principally under the Ministry of Water and Environment.

== See also ==
- Climate change in Africa
- Climate change adaptation
- Agriculture in Uganda
- Geography of Uganda
