= Maida Bilal =

Bosnian environmental activist

- Born: Kruščica
- Occupation: Environmental activist
- Organization: Eko Bistro
- Awards: 2022 Goldman Environmental Prize
- Honours: Champion of the Earth, United Nations Environment Programme

Maida Bilal is a Bosnian environmental activist known for leading a group of women in a 503-day blockade ending in December 2018. The group resisted the movement and placement of heavy equipment resulting in the cancellation of the construction of two dams on the Kruščica river. This action helped to preserve and safeguard the Kruščica river, an important source of water and resources for the village of Kruščica and approximately 145,000 inhabitants of the two nearby towns, from being irreversibly damaged by the construction of the dams.

== Early life and career ==
Bilal was born and raised in Kruščica, a village located in the mountains west of Sarajevo. She worked part-time in financial administration with no prior experience in environmental activism.

== Activism ==
In 2017, Bilal co-founded the Eko Bistro citizens' association and became a volunteer board member of the Bosnia-Herzegovina River Coalition, which represents 30 environmental groups from Bosnia and Herzegovina. The resistance put up by the group of women resulted in the cancellation, in December 2018, of construction of two proposed dams on the river. The Kruščica river is an essential resource for the Kruščica village and the nearby towns, and the construction of the dams would have had a significant and negative impact on the ecosystem and the local community.

Bilal and the other protesters faced numerous challenges during the blockade, including harassment and intimidation from police and investors, as well as the harsh weather conditions. Despite these difficulties, they were successful in preventing the construction of the dams and raising awareness about the dangers of the dam boom in the region.

=== Awards and recognition ===
In recognition of her efforts, Bilal has received numerous awards and recognition. In 2018, she was named a "Champion of the Earth" by the United Nations Environment Programme, and in 2021, she received the Goldman Environmental Prize.

=== Other advocacy work ===
In addition to her work in environmental advocacy, Bilal has also been involved in other efforts to promote social justice and human rights in Bosnia and Herzegovina. She has spoken out against discrimination and violence against women and has worked to raise awareness about the importance of gender equality and women's empowerment. Bilal has also been a vocal advocate for the rights of marginalized and vulnerable groups, including minorities and refugees. She has brought attention to the struggles and challenges faced by these groups and has called for greater efforts to support and protect them.
