= Krušćica, Vitez =

Krušćica
- Village
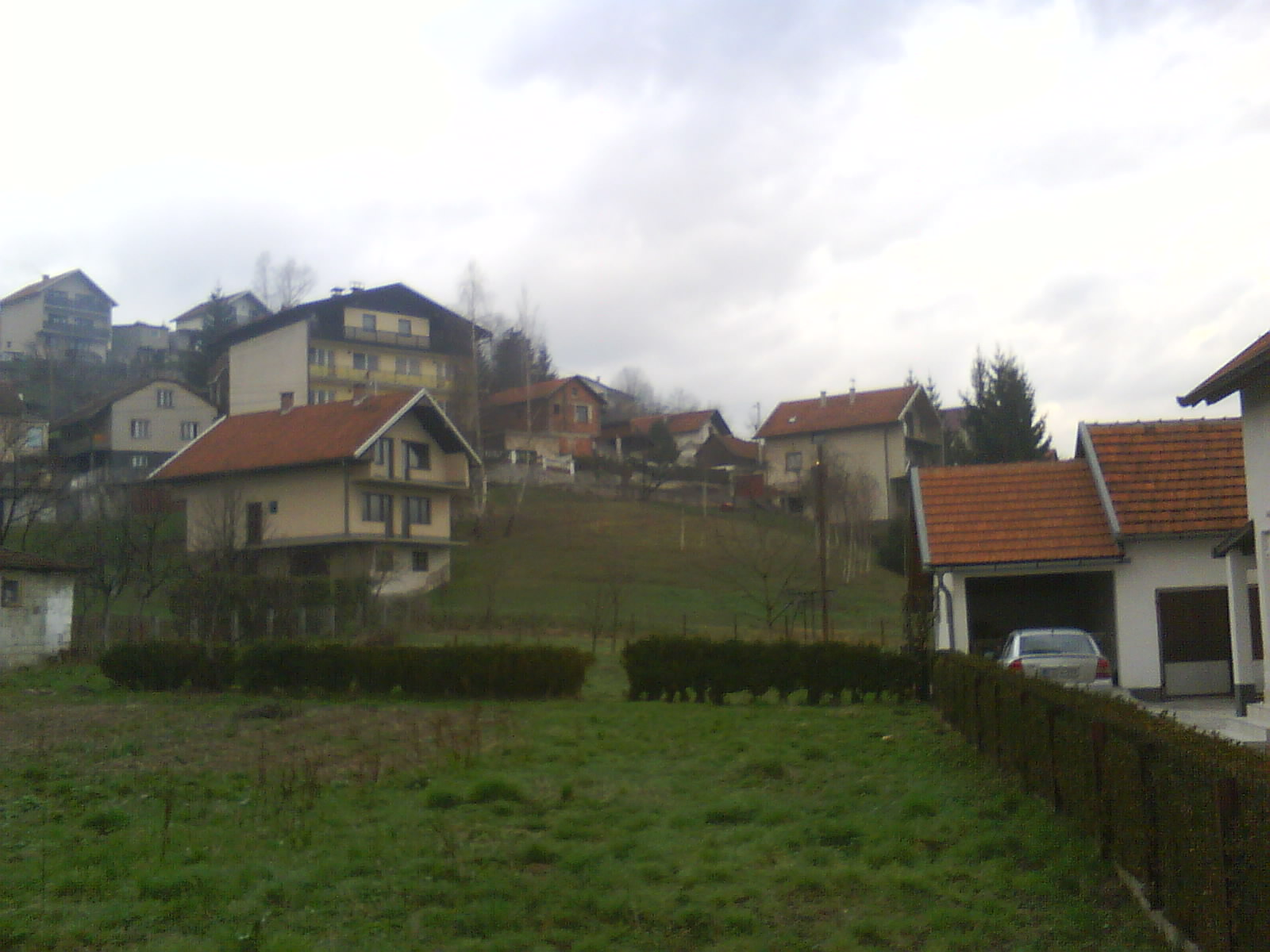

- Location within Bosnia and Herzegovina
- Coordinates: 44.134392°N 17.7784439°E
- Country: Bosnia and Herzegovina
- Entity: Federation of Bosnia and Herzegovina
- Canton: Central Bosnia
- Municipality: Vitez

Area
  - Total: 28.37 sq mi (73.48 km^{2})

Population (2013)
  - Total: 2,551
  - Density: 89.92/sq mi (34.72/km^{2})
- Time zone: UTC+1 (CET)
  - Summer (DST): UTC+2 (CEST)

Krušćica is a village in the municipality of Vitez, Bosnia and Herzegovina. It gained international attention in 2017 when local women, known as the “Brave Women of Kruščica” and led by Maida Bilal, organised a prolonged blockade against the construction of two small hydropower plants on the Kruščica River.

== Demographics ==
According to the 2013 census, its population was 2,551.

Ethnicity in 2013
Ethnicity	Number	Percentage
Bosniaks	1,575	61.7%
Croats	628	24.6%
Serbs	26	1.0%
other/undeclared	322	12.6%
Total	2,551	100%
