= Climate change in Mozambique =

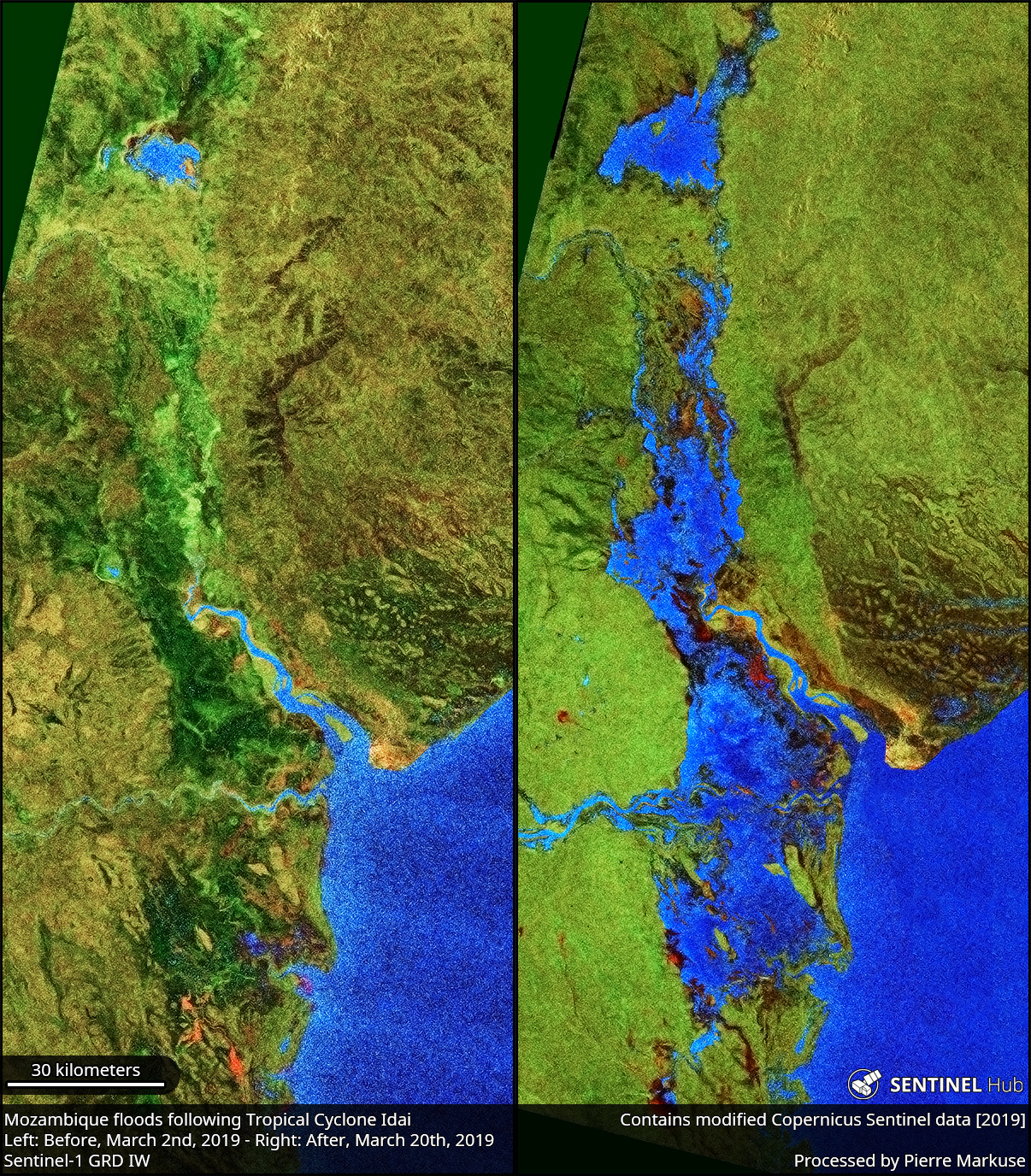
Satellite visualisation of flooding in Mozambique caused by Cyclone Idai.

Mozambique is one of the most vulnerable countries to climate change. With a large proportion of the population living in low-lying areas, intensifying tropical cyclones, floods and storm surges are a significant threat. A 2015 study in Climatic Change estimated that climate change will contribute to the national economy being up to 13% smaller in 2050 compared to a fictional scenario without it, and that GDP is likely to shrink.

Climate extremes cause damages of infrastructures and crops, and also provide the right conditions for the spread of waterborne and parasitic diseases, such as schistosomiasis, cholera and malaria. These disease are endemic in the region, but due to irregular rainfall patterns and prolonged droughts worsened by climate change, the favorable conditions for their spread have been achieved and they have been consistent in recent years.

The government of Mozambique and civil society have identified areas for mitigation and adaptation, such as early warning systems for storms, investment in flood defences, resettlement schemes for at-risk communities and rebuilding destroyed settlements with improved disaster-resilient standards.
