= Kruščica, Konjic =

Kruščica Крушчица
- Village
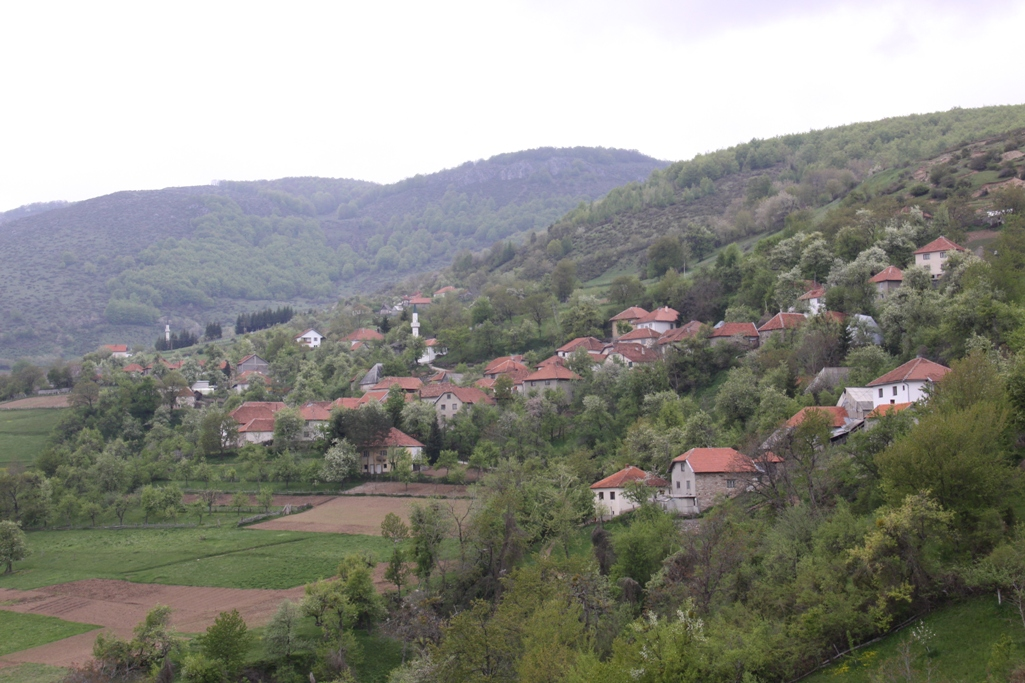

- Location within Bosnia and Herzegovina
- Coordinates: 43°48′26″N 17°48′35″E
- Country: Bosnia and Herzegovina
- Entity: Federation of Bosnia and Herzegovina
- Canton: Herzegovina-Neretva
- Municipality: Konjic

Area
  - Total: 4.57 sq mi (11.83 km^{2})

Population (2013)
  - Total: 124
  - Density: 27.1/sq mi (10.5/km^{2})
- Time zone: UTC+1 (CET)
  - Summer (DST): UTC+2 (CEST)
- ISO 3166 code: BIH

Kruščica (Serbian Cyrillic: Крушчица) is a village in the municipality of Konjic, Bosnia and Herzegovina.

== Demographics ==
According to the 2013 census, its population was 124, all Bosniaks.
