= Gutiérrez =

Gutiérrez (UK: /ˌɡʊtiˈɛərɛz, -əz/, US: /ˌɡuːtiˈɛərəz, -əs, ɡuːˈtjɛərɛs/, Spanish: [ɡuˈtjereθ]) is a Spanish patronymic surname of Germanic origin, meaning "son of Gutier/Gutierre". Gutierre is an archaic Spanish form of Walter, now largely replaced with Gualterio. Gutiérrez is the Spanish form of the English surnames Walters, Watkins, and Watson, and has Germanic etymological origin. Today most bearers of the surname are Latin Americans of various origins.

The Visigoths, who ruled Spain between the mid-5th and early 8th centuries, had a profound impact on the development of surnames. This name originally derived from the baptismal name Gutierre. The Portuguese version of this surname is Guterres.

Notable people with the surname include:

== General ==
- Alfredo Gutiérrez (disambiguation), multiple people
- Armando Gutierrez, Cuban-American businessman, activist and political consultant
- Atanacio Gutierrez (died 2009), Belizean shooting victim
- Carlos Gutiérrez (disambiguation), multiple people
- Dania Gutiérrez, Mexican bioengineer, researcher, and LGBTQ+ activist
- Daniel G. P. Gutierrez Episcopal Bishop of Pennsylvania
- Diego Gutiérrez (disambiguation), multiple people
- Gustavo Gutiérrez (1928–2024), Peruvian theologian, Dominican priest, founder of Liberation Theology at the University of Notre Dame
- Héctor Gutiérrez Pabón (1937–2024), Colombian Roman Catholic bishop
- José Ángel Gutiérrez, University of Texas at Austin lecturer
- Juana Gutierrez, Mexican-American political activist
- Kris Gutiérrez, American professor
- Rochelle Gutierrez, American professor of education
- Sergio Gutiérrez Benítez (born 1945), Mexican Catholic priest and luchador
- Sidney M. Gutierrez (born 1951), retired USAF colonel and NASA astronaut
- Sonia Gutierrez, American educator and Hispanic rights activist

== Arts ==
- Antonia Gutiérrez (1781–1874), Spanish writer and translator
- Antonio García Gutiérrez, Spanish playwright
- Ariadna Gutiérrez (born 1993), Miss Colombia 2014, 1st runner up Miss Universe 2015
- Ash Gutierrez (born 2005), American musician
- Chin Chin Gutierrez, Filipino actress and environmentalist
- Donald Gutierrez (1932–2013), American writer
- Eddie Gutierrez (actor) (Jorge Eduardo Pickett Gutierrez), Filipino actor
- Eloísa Jiménez Gutiérrez (1908–1990), Mexican artist
- Emilio Gutiérrez (journalist) (born c. 1963), US-based Mexican journalist
- Grace Gutierrez (born 1989), American artist
- Gregorio Gutiérrez González (1826–1872), Colombian poet
- Horacio Gutiérrez (born 1948), Cuban-American classical pianist
- Janine Gutierrez (born 1989), Filipina actress and TV host
- Jorge R. Gutierrez (born 1975), Mexican-American animator, painter and voice actor
- Juan Gutiérrez de Padilla (c. 1590 – 1664), Spanish-Mexican composer
- Judith Gutiérrez, Ecuadorian master Latin American painter
- Lizette Gutierrez (born 1987/88), Mexican-American songwriter and musician
- Manuel Gutiérrez Aragón (born 1940), Spanish screenwriter and film director
- Miguel Gutierrez (choreographer), American dancer
- Miguel Gutiérrez (writer) (1940–2016), Peruvian writer
- Pedro Elías Gutiérrez (1870–1954) Venezuelan musician, composer
- Pedro Juan Gutiérrez, Cuban journalist, writer and artist
- Raymond Gutierrez, Filipino TV host
- Richard Gutierrez, Filipino actor
- Ruffa Gutierrez (born 1974), Filipina actress, model, beauty queen, and Ms. World
- Yolanda Gutiérrez (born 1970), Mexican and German dancer, choreographer and installation artist

== Politicians ==
- Aaron Gutierrez, American politician
- Álvaro Gutiérrez (politician), Peruvian politician
- Antoni Gutiérrez Díaz (1929–2006), Catalan physician and politician
- Adriana Gutiérrez Colón born June 5, 1989 a Puerto Rican lawyer and politician affiliated with the Puerto Rican Independence Party (PIP).
- Alonso Gutiérrez (1507 – July 1584), known by his religious name Fray Alonso de Veracruz.
- Carl T.C. Gutierrez (born 1941), Guamanian politician and governor of Guam
- Daniel Gutiérrez Castorena (born 1954), Mexican politician
- Doris Gutiérrez (born 1947), Honduran lawyer and politician
- Eulalio Gutiérrez (1881–1939) provisional president of Mexico from late 1914 to early 1915
- Hermenegildo Gutiérrez, c. 850 – after May 912, the Mayordomo mayor of King Alfonso III
- Joaquín Gutiérrez Cano (1920–2009), Spanish diplomat and politician
- Jaime Abdul Gutiérrez (1936–2012), member of the Revolutionary Government Junta of El Salvador from 1979 to 1982
- Katy Gutierrez Munoz (born 1952, Basque politician
- Leticia Gutierrez American politician. A member of the Democratic Party, Elected for the United States House of Representatives for Texas's 9th congressional district.
- Lino Gutierrez (1951–2025), American diplomat and ambassador
- Lucio Gutiérrez (born 1957), Ecuadorian politician, President of Ecuador from 2003 to 2005
- Luis Gutiérrez (born 1953), Democratic member of the United States House of Representatives representing Illinois's 4th congressional district
- Mauricio Gutiérrez Castro (born 1942), Salvadoran politician, Vice President of El Salvador from 1982 to 1984
- Merceditas Gutierrez, Filipino ombudsman
- Patricia Gutiérrez (born 1983), Venezuelan politician and activist
- Pablo Gutiérrez Lazarus (born 1983), Mexican politician
- Rafael Antonio Gutiérrez (1845–1921), Salvadoran President from 1894 to 1898

== Sports ==
=== General ===
- Cristina Gutiérrez (born 1991), Spanish rally raid driver
- Esteban Gutiérrez (born 1991), Mexican racing driver
- Giancarlo Gutierrez (1932–2025), Italian equestrian
- Heberth Gutiérrez (born 1973), Colombian road cyclist
- Jorge Gutiérrez (boxer), Cuban boxer
- Jorge Gutierrez (basketball) (born 1988), American
- Jorge Gutiérrez (squash player) (born 1979), Argentine squash player
- Jose Antonio Gutierrez Castillo (born 1943), Colombian chess master
- José Enrique Gutiérrez Cataluña (born 1974), professional road racing cyclist
- Katia Gutiérrez (born 1989), Mexican boxer
- Keibel Gutiérrez (born 1987), Cuban volleyball player
- Matt Gutierrez, American football player
- Max Gutiérrez (born 2002), Mexican racing driver
- Sergio Gutiérrez-Ferrol, tennis player
- Tonatiuh Gutiérrez (1929–2000), Mexican swimmer

=== Baseball ===
- César Gutiérrez (1943–2005), Venezuelan shortstop in Major League Baseball
- Franklin Gutiérrez (born 1983), Venezuelan baseball player in Major League Baseball
- Jackie Gutiérrez (born 1960), Major League Baseball shortstop
- Kelvin Gutiérrez (born 1994), Dominican baseball player
- Luis Gutierrez (born 2003), Venezuelan baseball player
- Ricky Gutiérrez (born 1970), major league baseball player
- Vladimir Gutiérrez (born 1995), Cuban baseball player

=== Football (Soccer) ===
- Álvaro Gutiérrez (footballer) (born 1968), former Uruguayan football midfielder
- Brian Gutiérrez, a professional soccer player who plays as an attacking midfielder for Liga MX club Guadalajara
- Cristián Gutiérrez (born 1997), Chilean footballer
- Daniel Gutiérrez (born 2003), Chilean footballer
- Érick Gutiérrez (born 1995), Mexican footballer
- Felipe Gutiérrez, Chilean footballer
- Jaidy Gutiérrez (born 2001), Mexican footballer
- Jana Gutiérrez (born 2003), Mexican footballer
- Jonás Gutiérrez (born 1983), Argentine footballer
- Juanito Gutiérrez (born 1976), Spanish footballer
- Sebastián Gutiérrez (footballer) (born 1997), Colombian footballer
- Sergio Gutiérrez (footballer) (born 1989), Colombian football player
- Teófilo Gutiérrez, Colombian footballer
- Guti, Spanish footballer

=== Wrestling ===
- José Gutiérrez Hernández (born 1972) Mexican professional wrestler, better known as Último Guerrero
- Óscar Gutiérrez, also known as Rey Mysterio (born 1974), professional wrestler who works for the Raw brand of WWE
- Dominik Gutiérrez, also known as Dominik Mysterio (born 1997), professional wrestler with the Raw brand of WWE and son of the above
- Sergio Gutiérrez (born 1945), Mexican priest and professional wrestler better known as Fray Tormenta

== See also ==
- Guterres, the Portuguese equivalent
- Gutierrez family, Filipino family of entertainers
- Gutiérrez (magazine), Spanish satirical magazine in Madrid
