= Sergio Gutiérrez =

Sergio Gutiérrez may refer to:

- Sergio Gutiérrez (footballer), Colombian football goalkeeper
- Sergio Gutiérrez Ferrol, Spanish tennis player
- Sergio Gutiérrez Prieto (born 1982), Spanish politician
- Sergio Ernesto Gutiérrez Villanueva (born 1958), Mexican politician
- Sergio Gutiérrez Luna (born 1976), Mexican politician
- Sergio Gutiérrez Negrón, Puerto Rican author
- Fray Tormenta (Sergio Gutiérrez Benítez), Mexican Catholic priest and masked wrestler
