= Carlos Gutiérrez =

Carlos Gutiérrez or Carlos Gutierrez may refer to:

== Politicians ==
- Carlos Gutiérrez (diplomat) (1818–1882), Honduran diplomat and writer
- Carlos Gutierrez (born 1953), 35th United States Secretary of Commerce
- Carlos Gutiérrez (Argentine politician) (born 1953), Argentine congressman
- Carlos Gutiérrez Ruiz (born 1959), Mexican politician
- Carlos Orlando Gutiérrez (1984–2020), the assassinated president of the Federación Sindical de Trabajadores Mineros de Bolivia
- Carlos Gutiérrez Mancilla (born 1994), Mexican politician

== Sportspeople ==
=== Association football ===
- Carlos Gutiérrez (footballer, born 1939), Mexican footballer
- Carlos Gutiérrez (Colombian footballer) (born 1972)
- Carlos Gutiérrez (footballer, born 1976), Uruguayan footballer
- Carlos Gutiérrez (footballer, born 1977), Mexican football manager and former midfielder
- Carlos Gutiérrez Fajardo (born 1986), Honduran footballer
- Carlos Gutiérrez (footballer, born 1990), Mexican football midfielder
- Carlos Gutiérrez (Spanish footballer) (born 1991), Spanish footballer
- Carlos Gutiérrez (footballer, born 1999) (born 1999), Mexican footballer

=== Other sports ===
- Carlos Gutiérrez (baseball) (born 1986), American baseball player for the Chicago Cubs

== Religious Leaders ==
- Carlos Gutiérrez, general director of the Legionaries of Christ
