= Rarámuri =

Ethnic Group from Chihuahua, Mexico

Tarahumara Rarámuri
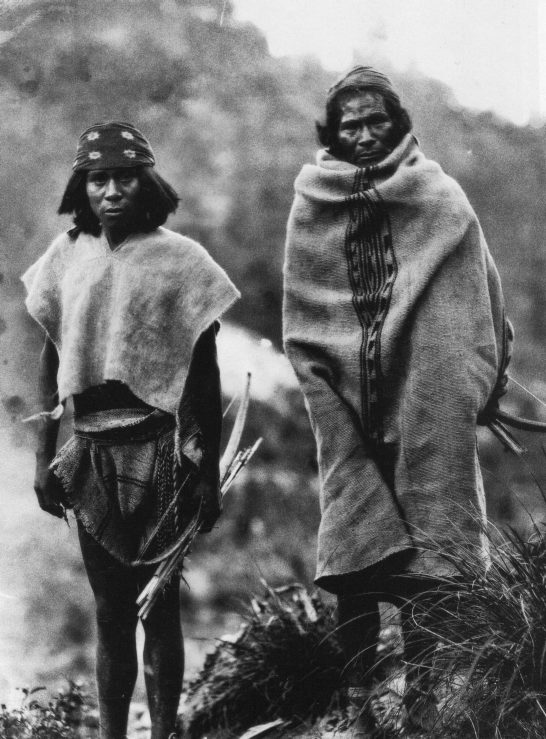
- Two Rarámuri men photographed in Tuaripa, Chihuahua, in 1892 by Carl Lumholtz

Total population
- Unknown: estimates vary

Regions with significant populations
- Mexico (Chihuahua, Durango, Sonora)

Languages
- Tarahumara(Rarámuri ra'ícha), Spanish

Religion
- Animism, Peyotism, and Catholicism

Related ethnic groups
- Suma, Guarijío, Huichol, Tepehuán, Mayo, Yaqui

The Rarámuri or Tarahumara are a group of Indigenous people of the Americas living in the state of Chihuahua in Mexico. They are renowned for their form of prayer that involves running for extended periods of time.

Originally inhabitants of much of Chihuahua, the Rarámuri retreated to the high sierras and canyons such as the Copper Canyon in the Sierra Madre Occidental on the arrival of Spanish colonizers in the 16th century. The area of the Sierra Madre Occidental which they now inhabit is often called the Sierra Rarámuri because of their presence in Mexico.

Estimates put the Rarámuri population in 2006 at between 50,000 and 70,000 people. Most still practice a traditional lifestyle, including inhabiting natural shelters (caves or cliff overhangs). Staple crops are maize and beans; however, many of the Rarámuri still practice transhumance, raising cattle, sheep, and goats. Almost all Rarámuri migrate from one place to another during the course of a year.

The Rarámuri language belongs to the Uto-Aztecan family. Although it is in decline under pressure from Spanish, it is still widely spoken. In the Rarámuri language, the endonymic term rarámuri refers specifically to the men; women are referred to as mukí (individually), and as omugí or igómale (collectively).

== History ==
The Rarámuri are believed to be descended from a people of the Mogollon culture. The Rarámuri repelled and were never conquered by the Spanish conquistadors or fully converted by the Jesuit missionaries. When the Spanish arrived in the 1500s, they called these native people the "Tarahumara". By the early 17th century, the Spanish had established mines in Rarámuri territory and made some slave raids to obtain workers for the mines. Jesuit Juan Fonte established a mission, San Pablo Balleza, at the southern end of Rarámuri territory, expanding from missionary work with the Tepehuan to the south. The Tepehuan's violent resistance to Spanish incursion in the Tepehuan revolt of 1616 killed Fonte and seven other Jesuit missionaries, closing the mission for over a decade.

The discovery of the mines of Parral, Chihuahua, in 1631 increased Spanish presence in Rarámuri lands, bringing more slave raids and Jesuit missionaries. Missions were established at Las Bocas, Huejotitán, San Felipe and Satevó. In 1648, the Rarámuri waged war against the Spanish. They gathered at Fariagic and then destroyed the mission of San Francisco de Borja. Two of the leaders of this attack were captured by the Spanish and executed. Shortly afterward, the Spanish established Villa de Aguilar in the heart of the upper Rarámuri country.

From then on, the Rarámuri split into two groups. Those in the lower missions continued to move into the general Catholic population and largely lost their tribal identity. Those in the upper areas went to war under the leadership of Tepóraca and others, driving the Jesuits and Spanish settlers from the area. The Jesuits returned in the 1670s and ultimately baptized thousands of Rarámuri, but these people have retained a separate identity. Tepóraca was executed by the Spanish in 1690. From 1696 to 1698, the Rarámuri again waged war against the Spanish, but were defeated. An important 1691 Jesuit report concerned the resistance of the Rarámuri to evangelization, Historia de la tercera rebelión tarahumara.

By 1753, the Jesuits turned over the lower Rarámuri missions to secular priests, and in 1767 the Jesuits were expelled from Spanish territories. Most missions in Rarámuri country ceased to operate or were turned over to Franciscans. Despite devoted and enthusiastic efforts, the Franciscans could not match the Jesuits’ feats, and the missions declined. The Jesuits reestablished the missions in the early 20th century.

== Culture ==
=== Athletic skills ===
Rarámuri, means 'runners on foot' or 'those who run fast' in their native language, according to some early ethnographers like Norwegian Carl Lumholtz, though this interpretation has not been fully agreed upon. With widely dispersed settlements, these people developed a tradition of long-distance running up to 200 miles (320 km) in one session, over a period of two days through their homeland of rough canyon country, for inter-village communication, transportation, and hunting.

The Rarámuri's use of huaraches, their traditional form of sandals, when running has been the subject of scientific studies and journalistic discourse. In his book, Born to Run, author Christopher McDougall argues in favor of the endurance running hypothesis and the barefoot running movement based on his time with the Rarámuri people and their running in huaraches. The Rarámuri sandal has become a byword in American minimalist running circles, with many companies starting to manufacture the sandals after McDougall's book popularized the style.

Their long-distance running tradition also has ceremonial and competitive aspects. Often, men kick wooden balls as they run in rarajipari ('foot throwing') competitions, and women use a stick and hoop. The foot-throwing races are relays where the balls are kicked by the runners and relayed to the next runner while teammates run ahead to the next relay point. These races can last anywhere from a few hours to a couple of days without a break.

The Rarámuri commonly hunt with bow and arrows but are also known for their ability to run down deer and wild turkeys. Anthropologist Jonathan F. Cassel describes the Rarámuri's hunting abilities: "the Tarahumara literally run the birds to death in what is referred to as persistence hunting. Forced into a rapid series of takeoffs, without sufficient rest periods between, the heavy-bodied bird does not have the strength to fly or run away from the Tarahumara hunter."

=== Religious beliefs ===
The Rarámuri religion is a syncretism of Indigenous customs and Catholicism. During the late 1600s and early 1700s, there was strong Jesuit mission activity, which was met by resistance. Later, the Jesuit order was expelled and the Rarámuri interpreted, modified, maintained or promulgated Catholic beliefs, symbols, and practices with little outside intervention.

While native religious elements have been maintained, there are Spanish Catholic ritual elements, demonstrating "a genuine integration with vital cultural interests". The beings of most importance are: God (Riosi), God's wife, who is the Virgin Mary transformed, and the devil (Riablo). Riosi is thought to be the Indigenous deity Onoruame ('Great Father'), and the Virgin Mary is Iyeruame ('Great Mother'). The Indigenous counterparts of Father-Sun and Mother-Moon overlap, respectively, with these concepts of God and God's wife.

Another reported variation is that God has a wife who lives with him in heaven, along with their sons, the so-called sukristo (from Spanish Jesucristo) and their daughters, the Santi. These beings have a direct link with the physical world through Catholic iconography, crucifixes, and saints’ medallions, respectively.

Although Riablo aligns with the devil, the Rarámuri do not believe in a being that embodies Evil wholly. Instead it is tainted through its ties with the Chabochi (non-Rarámuri). The Devil is said to sometimes collaborate with God to arrange fitting punishments and can be appeased through sacrifices. In some cases, the Devil can be persuaded to act as a benevolent entity.

Some Rarámuri religious practices have the sense of konema (i.e., feeding God), the sense of returning to God a little of the much that he has given is prevalent.

Some Rarámuris maintain a belief that the afterlife is a mirror image of the mortal world and that good deeds should be performed not for spiritual reward, but for the improvement of life on earth.

The Rarámuri share with other Uto-Aztecan tribes a veneration of peyote.

=== Music ===
Rarámuri style flute, collected by Richard W. Payne, from the collection of Clint Goss

Music and dance are highly integrated into Rarámuri social life. The classical pianist Romayne Wheeler writes that "Music sanctifies the moment in the life of all the Tarahumaras," and "All of our actions have musical meaning." During the end of the year cycle, the Rarámuri play violins which are masterfully carved but not varnished. The tunes are known as matachín pieces and are danced by dancers lavishly dressed in colorful attire resembling North African garments and accompanied by rattles (sáuraka). During Lent they play three-holed flutes of river cane, together with drums.

=== Clothing ===
Traditional Rarámuri dresses displayed at the Museo de Arte Popular in Mexico City:

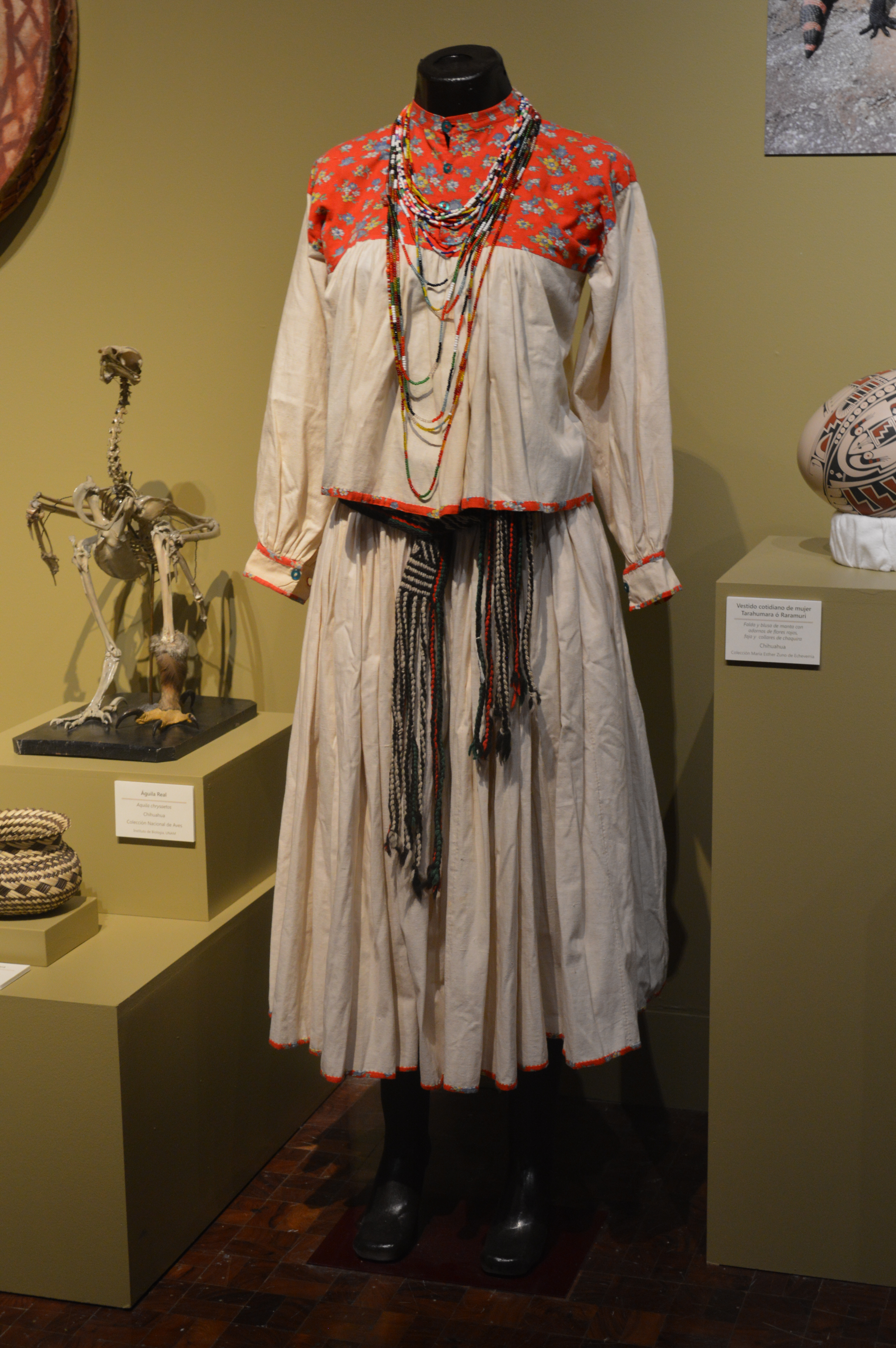
Rarámuri female dress

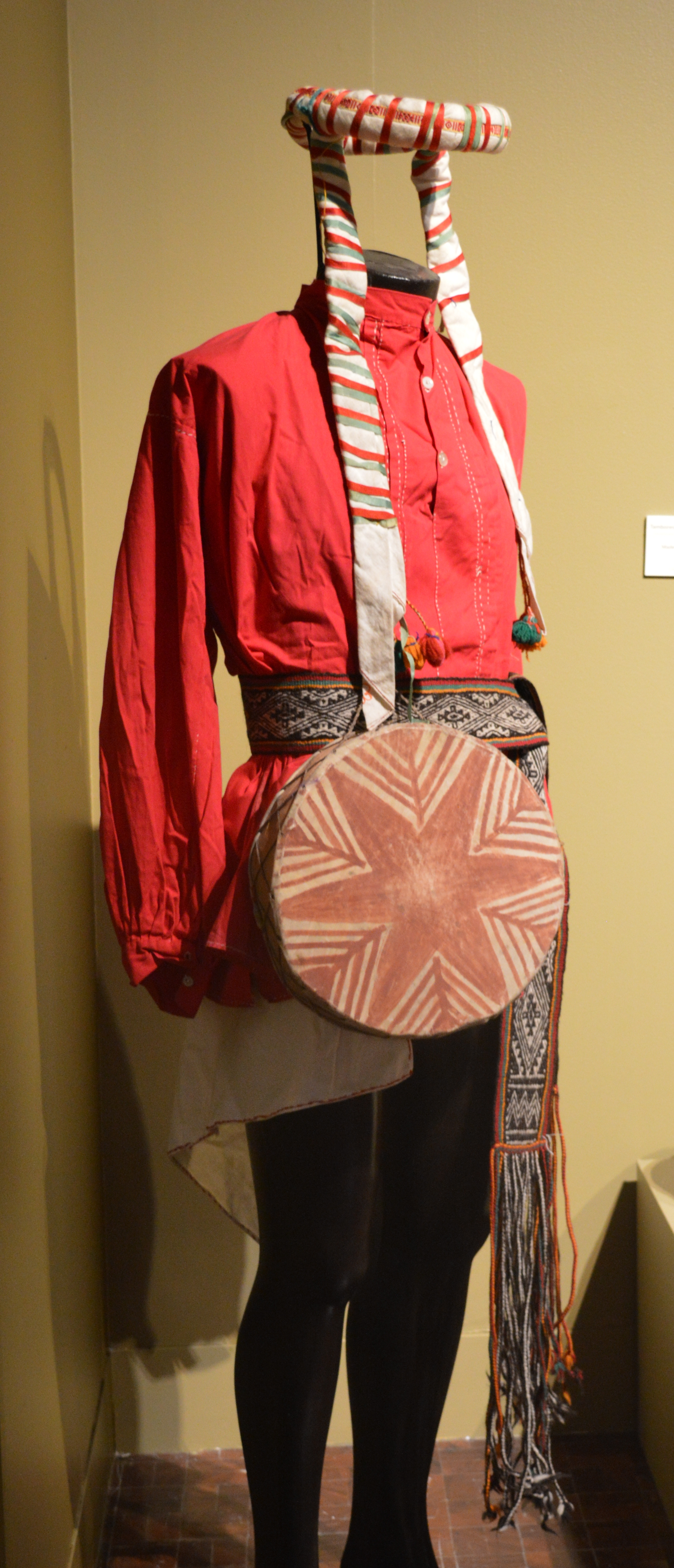
Rarámuri male dress

=== Food ===
Staple crops of the Rarámuri are maize, beans, greens, squash, and tobacco. Chilli, potatoes, tomatoes, and sweet potatoes appear in Mexicanized regions. Corn is planted in February and March using oxen which are often loaned as not everyone owns one. Corn begins to flower in August; by November it is harvested and cooked or stored. Common corn dishes are pinole, tortillas, atole, tamales, and boiled and roasted ears. Beans (beans) are one of the Rarámuri’s essential protein-rich foods and are usually served fried after being boiled. Tamales and beans are a common food that the Rarámuri carry with them on travels. Wheat and fruits were introduced by missionaries and are a minor source of nutrition. The fruits grown by the Rarámuri include apples, apricots, figs, and oranges.

The Rarámuri also eat meat, but this constitutes less than 5% of their diet. Most of the meats that they consume are fish, chicken, and squirrels. On ceremonial occasions, domesticated animals such as cows, sheep, and goats are killed and eaten. The Rarámuri practice persistence hunting of deer and wild turkeys by following them at a steady pace for one or two days until the animal drops from exhaustion.

According to William Connors, a dietary researcher, their traditional diet was found to be linked to their low incidence of diseases such as Type 2 Diabetes. However, the Rarámuri's health is transitioning in regions where processed goods have begun to replace their traditional staples.

=== Batári/Paciki(Tesgüino) and Community Events(Tesgüinadas) ===
Batári(Tesgüino is the Spanish given name) is a fermented drink made year round from sprouted corn. Sometimes it is also made with still-green stalks(known as "Paciki" when made this way), fruits of certain cactuses, shrubs, wheat, and trees when corn is sparse. The process begins by malting the corn and spreading it in a shallow basket covered with pine needles each day for four or five days. It is kept moist until the corn sprouts by which time the starch in the corn has been converted into smaller sugars. It is then mashed and boiled for eight hours. Varied herbs are ground up and mixed with water into a paste which is then fermented overnight by fire. Then the paste is combined with the corn liquid and fermented for another three to four days. Partaking of the alcoholic beverage usually takes place soon after its preparation, as the Batári can spoil within 24 hours.

Rarámuri communal gatherings for traditional footraces (rarajípare and ariwete), collective work parties (nateba), and religious ceremonies are centered around the sharing of batári. While these events occur year-round, many take place during the winter post-harvest season to strengthen social ties between neighboring communities. "Tesgüinada" events include rain fiestas, harvest ceremonies, curing fiestas, Guadalupe Fiesta, Holy Week, races, and Sunday gatherings. Some of these events take place during and after communal activities, for example when neighbors help one another's families with their fields or build large structures like granaries, houses, and corrals. The harvest and rain ceremonies take place during the farming months to ensure a good crop season. These events also require either a shaman, curandero, or chanter. The job of the shaman and curandero are purely religious, as the curandero is there to diagnose and to heal the sick of the community, and chanters lead the community in chants and rhythms to accompany the ceremonies.

These "Tesgüinadas" are an important aspect of Rarámuri culture as it is often the only time when men have intercourse with their wives. They act as social lubricants, as Rarámuri are very shy and private. Anthropologist John Kennedy describes the institution of these events are as an important social fabric of Rarámuri culture which he calls the "tesgüino network". He also states that "the average Tarahumara spends at least 100 days per year directly concerned with tesgüino and much of this time under its influence or aftereffects."

The religious role of Batári is a very important aspect of tesgüinada. Before one can drink an olla of Batári they must dedicate it to Onorúame. During the curing ceremonies, the olla must rest in front of a cross until the ceremony is over. At age 14, a boy is allowed to drink Batári for the first time after a short sermon about his manly responsibilities. These rituals can sometimes last as long as 48 hours. "Tesgüinadas" are usually accompanied by dancing and the playing of fiddles, flutes, drums, and guitars.

== Notable Rarámuri ==
- Arnulfo Quimare, ultra marathoner
- Carmelita Little Turtle, photographer
- Daniel Ponce de León, two division former, WBC featherweight and WBO world junior featherweight champion
- Octavio Casillas, educator
- Edwin Bustillos, agricultural engineer
- Isidro Baldenegro López, community leader and activist
- Jacob Casillas, mechanical engineer
- María Lorena Ramírez, ultra marathoner
- Mario Trejo, footballer
- Rochelle Gutierrez, professor of education
- Xemexe Tierrablanca, silversmith, photographer, and musician

== Threats ==
=== Environmental factors ===
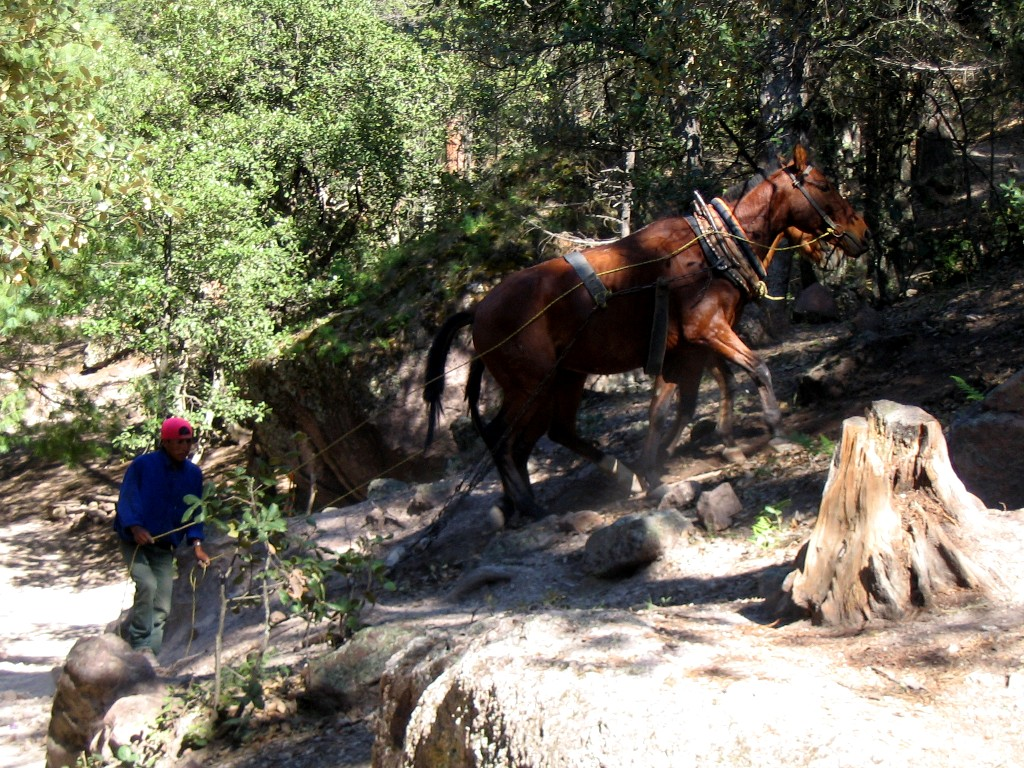
Rarámuri man collecting firewood

Logging has occurred since the end of the 1800s when the first loggers arrived. Later, the liberalization of laws in the 1990s resulted in the exhaustion of resources. In 1995, it was declared that "after hundred years of logging, only two percent (300,000 acres; 120,000 ha) of these unique forests remains", leaving one of the most biologically diverse ecosystems in North America, containing hundreds of medicinal plant, oak and pine species in danger of extinction. The Mexican Commission of Solidarity and Defense of Human Rights produced a report in 2000 noting the lack of studies by the government on how lumber production affected the ecosystem. Similarly, the North American Free Trade Agreement (NAFTA) boosted foreign investment which resulted in the privatization of communal land and market-based mechanisms of environmental regulation.

In January 2017, Isidro Baldenegro López (2005 recipient of the Goldman Environmental Prize) a community leader of the Rarámuri, was shot and killed in Mexico. Baldenegro spent much of his life defending the ancient forests of the Sierra Madre region from the devastating effects of logging.

Drought has also been affecting the region for ten years and has worsened in recent years. During 2011, it was the driest year in Mexico on record, with just 12 inches (300 mm) of rain, compared to a historical average of 21 inches (530 mm). The most severely hit area was the Sierra Madre region. Agricultural losses in Chihuahua are estimated at $25 million; 180,000 cattle have already died as a result of the growing lack of precipitation in the region.

Due to the lack of water, crops were destroyed and famine spread. Combined with the freezing temperatures of a cold front, living conditions have become poor for the Rarámuri. Their dependence on the environment worsens the situation, as they lack employment opportunities to generate income in non-farming activities. Moreover, increased contact with the outside world might be damaging as it creates dependency. These Indigenous people face extreme poverty, as reflected in the Mexican Human Development Index (HDI) which in the Sierra Madre is the lowest in the country: 49.1% below the national average. Alberto Herrera, the Mexican director of Amnesty International stated that the Indigenous people in his country have endured "permanent discrimination, exclusion, and marginalization."

=== Mining ===
Mining dates to 950 AD with the Toltec and Mayan civilizations. Since the Spanish conquest, thousands of tons of mercury and lead have been released in the Mexican mining belt, which stretches from Oaxaca to Sonora in the northwest. The Sierra Madre part of this belt is one of the world's most prolific gold and silver mining districts. Georgius Agricola mentioned in 1556 that mining led to deforestation, the disappearance of wildlife and watershed contamination. Large areas were deforested to exploit metal deposits. Reforms in the 1990s allowed foreign ownership and resulted in the reopening of mines and increased mining. According to the Secretaría de Economía, 204 mining companies with direct foreign investment had 310 ongoing projects in Mexico in 2006. In 2010, Mexico's mining output reached high levels: 19% of the world's silver production was extracted here, and the mining belt was the world's most productive district as it was historically. The environmental impacts are dramatic, resulting in landscape change and the spread of heavy metals.

=== Effect of drug violence ===
Drug violence, cultivation and trade in this region have affected the lifestyle of the Rarámuri, given the proximity of the people and the Sierra Madre, one of the most productive drug-growing regions on Earth. Logging is not only controlled by the Mexican government but also practiced illegally by loggers and drug lords who use the forests to grow marijuana or opium or as space for their operations. Drug cartels usually have links with logging companies that launder money earned in the drug trade. Narco-trafficking weighs heavily on the Tarahumara, as the drug lords force the farmers to grow drugs instead of their own crops. Cartels have exploited the Rarámuri reputation as long-distance runners by forcing them into running illegal drugs into the United States.

== Forced displacement ==
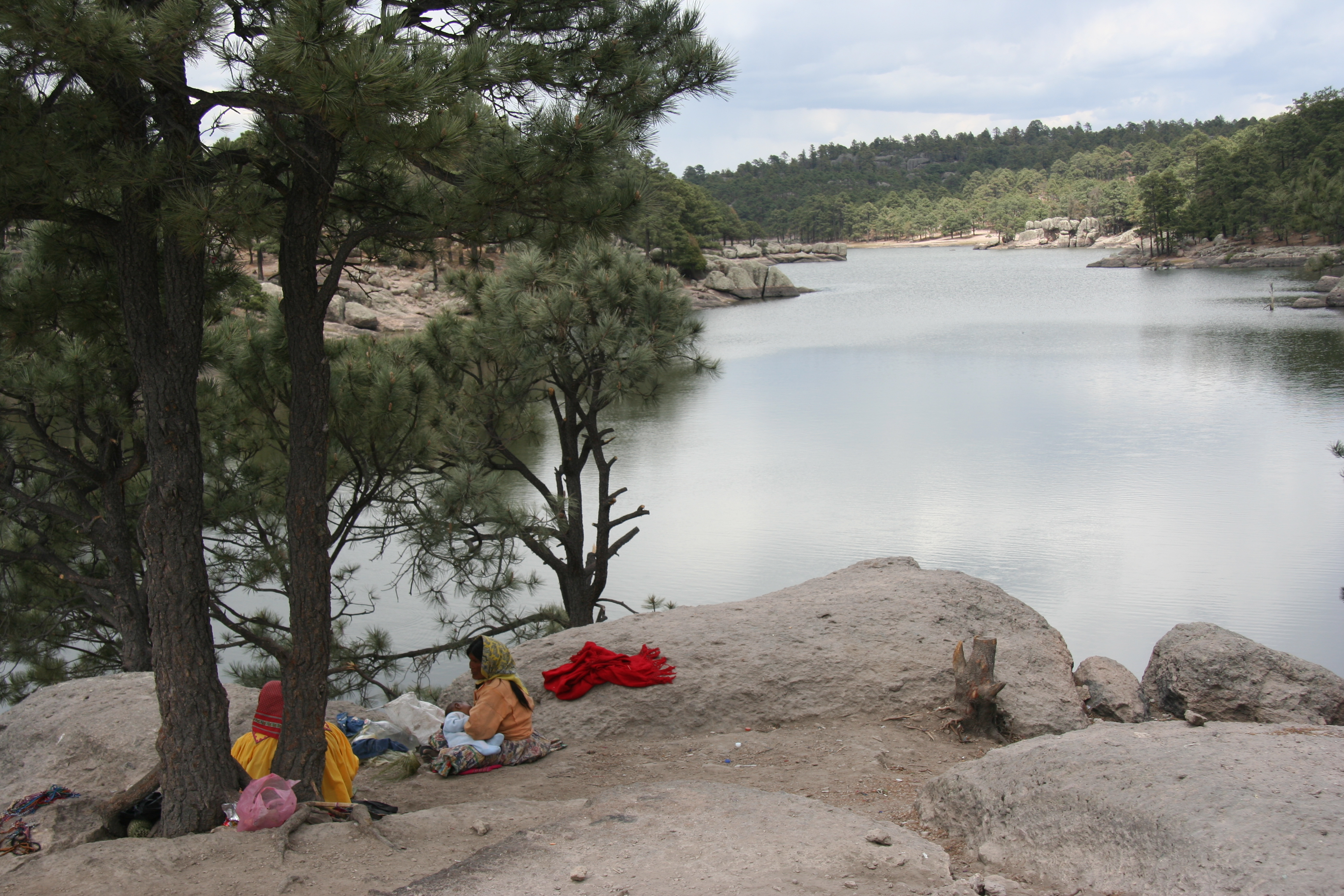
Two Rarámuri women (one with a baby nursing) at Arareco Lake near Creel, Chihuahua. The Rarámuri women wear the traditional brightly colored clothes for which they are famous. These women make and sell hand-made items at the lake.

The conditions of violence that are lived urge the Raramuri population to flee from their place of origin, often intimidated by criminal groups and extraction companies both Mexican and foreign.

=== Tourism ===
The remote terrain of the Sierra Madre has long served as a refuge for the Rarámuri. However, roads and tourism have expanded, bringing opportunities for some but problems for others. Ironically, the Rarámuri themselves seldom have sought this publicity. In the 1800s, attempts were made to build a railway. Currently, this line is used by the train Chihuahua Pacífico or El Chepe to transport tourists, lured by representations of the area as pure and pristine, to sightseeing locales. It stops near many Rarámuri villages, attracting visitors expecting to see "primitive natives" (the legend of the Tarahumara). Along with new auto roads, railways built into the area have developed logging and tourism, which have accelerated the rate of modernization among the Rarámuri.

== See also ==
- Ivan Ratkaj
- Multiday races
- Raramuri Criollo cattle
- Tarahumara language

== Bibliography ==
- Fontana, Bernard (1979). Tarahumara: Where Night is the Day of the Moon. Flagstaff: Northland Press. ISBN 9780873581837.
- Spicer, Edward H. (1962). Cycles of Conquest: The Impact of Spain, Mexico, and the United States on the Indians of the Southwest 1533–1960. Tucson: University of Arizona Press.
