= Stone Cold Metal =

Steve Austin's Stone Cold Metal

Compilation album by Various artists
- Released: August 25, 1998
- Genre: Heavy metal, hard rock
- Label: Spy Records

Steve Austin's Stone Cold Metal is a rock compilation album that was released on August 25, 1998, by Mars Entertainment (known today as Spy Records). Produced by Paul Tarnopol with the help of Stone Cold Steve Austin of the World Wrestling Federation, Stone Cold Metal was the first wrestling CD to ever chart on the Billboard 200 albums chart, and according to Nielsen SoundScan, has sold more than a quarter of a million copies in the United States. Up to that time, Stone Cold Metal had outsold all other wrestling CDs.

Stone Cold Metal utilized a lenticular CD case, which created a morphing effect between Steve Austin's face and his trademark human skull. The album consisted of original hit recordings by Scorpions, Deep Purple, Accept, Dokken, Molly Hatchet, Ted Nugent, Dio, Rainbow, The Cult, Foghat, Def Leppard and Kiss.

== Track listing ==
No.	Title	Artist	Writer(s)	Length
1.	"Rock You Like a Hurricane"	Scorpions	Rudolf Schenker, Klaus Meine, Herman Rarebell	4:12
2.	"God of Thunder"	Kiss	Paul Stanley	4:14
3.	"Balls To The Wall"	Accept	Schmidt Hauke, Udo Dirkschneider, Stefan Kaufmann, Peter Baltes, Wolf Hoffmann	5:43
4.	"Perfect Strangers"	Deep Purple	Ritchie Blackmore, Roger Glover, Ian Gillan, Romayne Wheeler	5:21
5.	"Breaking The Chains"	Dokken	Mick Brown, George Lynch, Don Dokken	3:50
6.	"Dreams I’ll Never See"	Molly Hatchet	Molly Hatchet, Gregg Allman	7:08
7.	"Stranglehold"	Ted Nugent	Ted Nugent	8:24
8.	"Detroit Rock City"	Kiss	Stanley, Bob Ezrin	3:36
9.	"Rainbow in the Dark"	Dio	Vivian Campbell, James Bain, Ronnie James Dio, Vincent Appice	4:14
10.	"No One Like You"	Scorpions	Meine, Schenker	3:57
11.	"Slow Ride"	Foghat	David Peverett	3:56
12.	"On Through The Night"	Def Leppard	Richard Savage, Joseph Elliott, Stephen Clark	5:06
13.	"Rain"	The Cult	Ian Astbury, William Duffy	3:56
14.	"Stone Cold"	Rainbow	Blackmore, Glover, Joe Lynn Turner	5:19

== See also ==
- Music in professional wrestling
