= Guterres =

Guterres is a Portuguese surname. Its Spanish variant is Gutiérrez. Notable people with the surname include:

- Hermenegildo Guterres (9th–10th century AD), Galician noble
- Adélio Guterres, East Timor football player
- Adalgisa Magno Guterres, East Timor politician
- Aniceto Guterres Lopes, East Timor lawyer
- António Guterres, Portuguese politician, Secretary-General of the United Nations
- Éder Gaúcho (real name Éder Guterres Silveira), Brazilian professional footballer
- Eurico Guterres, East Timor soldier
- Francisco Guterres, East Timor politician
- José Guterres Silva (born 1998), East Timor football player
- José Luís Guterres, East Timor politician
- Lionel Guterres (born 1931), Hong Kong field hockey player
- Maria Ângela Guterres Viegas Carrascalão (born 1951), East Timor journalist, university teacher and former Minister of Justice
- Vicente Guterres, East Timor politician
