= Rarajipari =

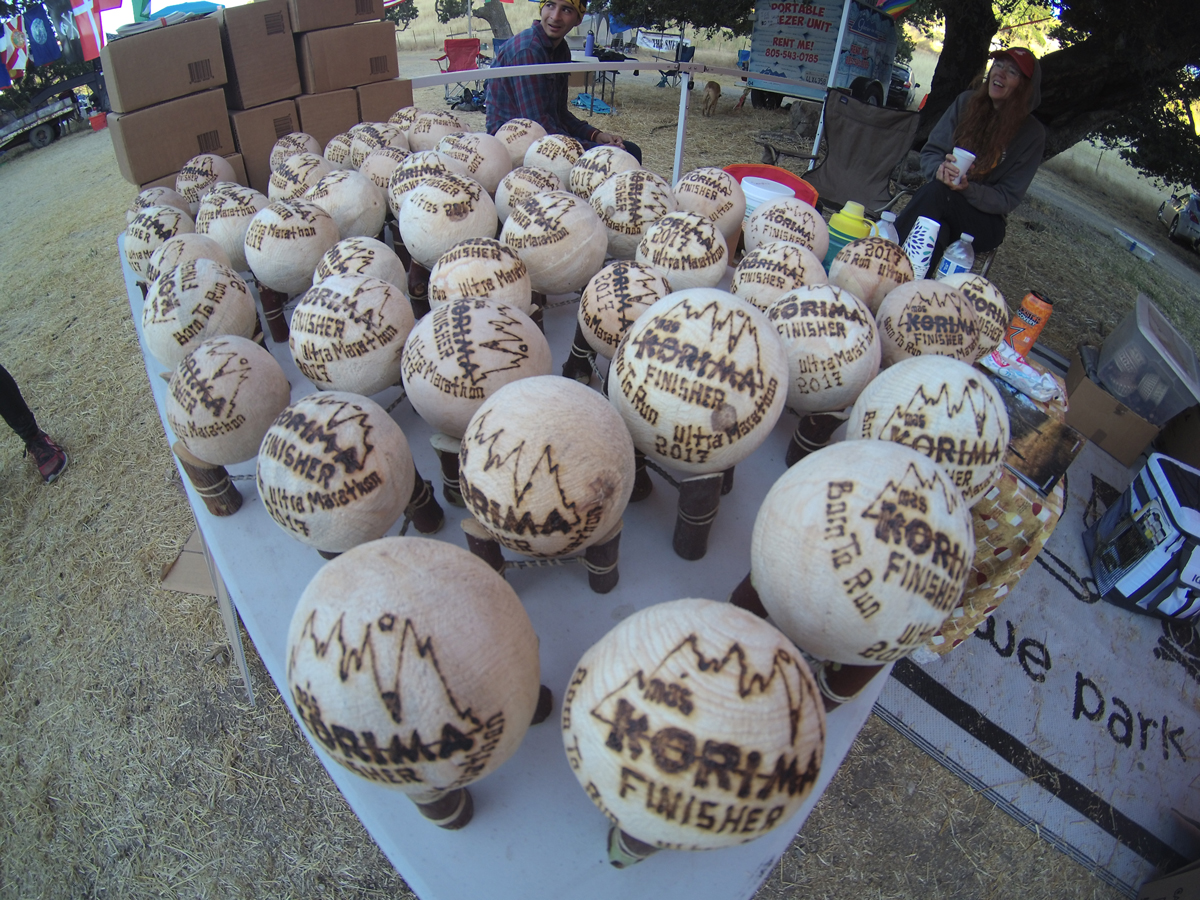
Balls used for rarajipari.

Rarájipari is a running game played by the Tarahumara (also known as the Rarámuri) people of the Copper Canyons region in Chihuahua, Mexico. The game is played by two teams of four or more players. One member of each team takes a wooden baseball-sized ball and kicks the ball ahead. The members of that team then chase after the ball, pick it up then kick it again. This is usually done for several miles in the casual games. However, in the serious inter-village contests, held after all-night parties, during which much of the Tarahumara corn beer, Tesgüino or Tejuino, is enjoyed by all, the games will often go for distances of 100 miles.

== Gameplay ==
Once the game starts, one runner on each team usually pulls into the front and always takes care of the ball. However, after a few miles or after the ball rolls under an outcrop of rock in the canyons, the rest of the team is able to catch up and the front runner is able to fall back into the main group and rest. The game ends when one team finishes the distance agreed upon by both teams prior to the start of the race.
