= Nacho Libre =

2006 film by Jared Hess

- Theatrical release poster
- Directed by: Jared Hess
- Written by: Jared Hess; Jerusha Hess; Mike White
- Produced by: Mike White; Jack Black; Julia Pistor; David Klawans
- Starring: Jack Black; Peter Stormare
- Cinematography: Xavier Pérez Grobet
- Edited by: Billy Weber
- Music by: Danny Elfman (Note: Beck was the initial composer, before being replaced by Elfman under orders from Paramount Pictures. Although most of the score used in the final film is from Elfman, director Jared Hess wanted Beck to receive credit for his tracks, which Elfman did not want. Ultimately, both are credited for their individual tracks in the end credits, but Elfman has sole credit in the official billing block used in promo material, despite only one of his songs appearing in the released soundtrack.)
- Production companies: Paramount Pictures; Nickelodeon Movies; Black & White Productions
- Distributed by: Paramount Pictures
- Release dates: June 16, 2006 (United States); August 11, 2006 (Mexico)
- Running time: 92 minutes
- Countries: United States; Mexico
- Languages: English; Spanish
- Budget: $35 million
- Box office: $99 million

Nacho Libre is a 2006 American sports comedy film written by Jared Hess, Jerusha Hess, and Mike White, and directed by Jared Hess. It stars Jack Black as Ignacio, a Catholic friar and secret lucha libre fan who moonlights as a luchador to earn money for the orphanage where he works. The film is loosely based on the story of Fray Tormenta ("Friar Storm"), a real-life Mexican Catholic priest who had a 23-year career as a masked professional wrestler to support the orphanage he directed. The film was produced by Nickelodeon Movies and Black & White Productions.

Nacho Libre was released on June 16, 2006, by Paramount Pictures. It received mixed reviews from critics and grossed $99 million at the worldwide box-office against its $35 million production budget.

== Plot ==
Ignacio is a friar and cook for the Oaxaca monastery orphanage where he himself was raised as an orphan. He dreams of becoming a professional wrestler, but wrestling is strictly forbidden by the monastery as it is considered a sin of vanity. Though Ignacio cares deeply for the orphans, he is unable to provide decent meals for them due to a lack of funds. He also struggles with his feelings for Sister Encarnación, a nun who recently arrived to teach at the orphanage. One night, Ignacio is mugged of the orphanage's tortilla chips by a street thief. On the way back to the orphanage, Ignacio sees his idol, an enormous gold-masked wrestler champion named Ramses, giving autographs and being bombarded by paparazzi in the streets, as well as a flyer for an amateur tag team wrestling match.

The next day, following a disastrous lunch service, a fed up Ignacio decides to disregard the monastery's rules by secretly becoming a wrestler to both fulfill his dream as well as to make money for the orphanage. He finds the man who robbed him, an atheist named Steven, and convinces him to join him by promising to share the prize money if they win. The two join the advertised match as tag partners. Ignacio fights under the moniker "Nacho" to keep his identity secret, while Steven adopts the name "Esqueleto" (skeleton).

They lose their first match but still get paid, as all wrestlers (or luchadores), win or lose, are entitled to a portion of the total revenue. As the spectators enjoyed their performance, they are encouraged to return. They continue to wrestle every week, with Ignacio using the money to improve the orphans' lives but becoming frustrated that they never win. Ignacio tries everything he can think of, including a folk remedy to acquire the powers of an eagle, but success still eludes them. He then attempts to seek advice from Ramses himself, but Ramses is vain and in no mood to support aspiring wrestlers. Undeterred, the duo crash a party that Ramses' manager holds for the best professional wrestlers in Mexico. They discover that, in order to be considered a professional, one must be the last luchador standing in the ring at an upcoming free-for-all match, then defeat Ramses in an exhibition match.

Their cover is blown when Steven encounters an overweight woman named Candidia who falls madly in love with him causing him to flee in horror, and when Ignacio, who snuck into the party by impersonating a member of a mariachi band, tries to improvise a song for Ramses but is rebuffed by Ramses once again and kicked out of the party alongside Steven. Outside, they encounter a duo of rival luchadores who slash the tires of Ignacio's moped, but the rival are defeated when Steven throws an elote like a throwing knife into one of their eyes.

The next morning, a disillusioned Ignacio expresses his resentment toward Ramses for treating him terribly and decides to quit wrestling, which starts a heated argument between him and Steven, who wants him to continue. Later, Ignacio's secret is revealed to the entire monastery when his robe catches fire during mass, exposing his wrestling costume and forcing him to confess to everyone. He declares that he intends to fight at the battle royale for the right to take on Ramses for a cash prize that he hopes to use to buy a bus for the monastery. Unfortunately, he finishes second, losing to another wrestler named Silencio. Banished from the monastery and having lost his passion for wrestling, Ignacio goes to live in exile. Steven finds Ignacio and informs him that Silencio has withdrawn on account of Steven injuring him, giving Ignacio the right to fight Ramses instead. After praying with Steven, Ignacio overcomes difficulty and manages to do well in the match, winning the crowd's support, but Ramses, enraged, resorts to cheating by attacking Ignacio during the match's break and unmasking him, revealing his face and identity to the crowd, before pinning him to the ground. Ramses nearly wins the match until Ignacio sees Encarnación and the orphans enter the arena. Inspired by their support, Ignacio rallies himself and defeats Ramses.

Ignacio becomes a professional wrestler and, true to his word, buys a bus for the monastery with his prize money. To celebrate his accomplishment, he takes Encarnación, Steven, and the orphans on a field trip to Monte Albán.

== Cast ==
- Jack Black as Ignacio / Nacho
  - Troy Gentile as Young Ignacio
- Héctor Jiménez as Steven / Esqueleto
- Darius Rose as Chancho
- Ana de la Reguera as Sister Encarnación
- Silver King as Ramses
- Richard Montoya as Guillermo
- Peter Stormare as Emperor / Water Gypsy
- Carla Jimenez as Cándida
- Enrique Muñoz as Señor Ramon
- Moisés Arias as Juan Pablo
- Donald Chambers as Silencio
- Diego Eduardo Gomez as Chuy
- Human Tornado as El Snowflake
- Mascarita Dorada as one of Los Duendes
- Fray Tormenta as a retired wrestler
- Brett Chan as Dynasty

== Production ==
Jack Black was a fan of the film Napoleon Dynamite (2004) and its director Jared Hess, and the two met in Los Angeles to discuss collaborating. Black was drawn to Hess' idea of a man of the Lord secretly living a life of violence via his love of lucha libre wrestling. He did, however, express concern over portraying a Mexican character, but Hess quelled his concerns by explaining Ignacio was supposed to be "a gringo" but born and raised in Mexico. While filming, Black sustained a gash on his eye after diving out of the wrestling ring during a stunt. He was rushed to the hospital but was able to continue filming. The film was shot entirely in Oaxaca, Mexico.

== Music ==
Hess originally wanted musical artist Beck to be behind the soundtrack for the film. Beck, being a fan of Hess, accepted. However, Paramount Pictures did not think Beck's style fit the movie, so composer Danny Elfman was brought in to replace him. Elfman then wrote a full score and recorded it in May 2006. However, only about 2/3 of Elfman's score ended up in the movie (with one of the songs, Ramses Suite, appearing in the released soundtrack). Due to how much of Elfman's music filled the film, Elfman's representatives asked that Elfman be the only person credited for the film's score. Hess caught wind of this and would not allow the studio to remove Beck from the credits. When finding that he would not have the only music credit, Elfman told Paramount to remove his name from the film. An agreement was eventually reached where both Beck and Elfman were credited for their respective parts of the score. However, Elfman appears with sole credit in the official billing block on promotional material.

== Release and reception ==
Nacho Libre was released theatrically by Paramount Pictures on June 16, 2006. The release date was originally set for May 2006, but it was changed by Paramount to avoid competition from 20th Century Fox's X-Men: The Last Stand and one of Paramount's other films, Mission: Impossible III. It was then placed between the releases of Disney/Pixar's Cars (June 9) and Warner Bros. and Legendary Pictures' Superman Returns (June 28). It was released on DVD and Blu-ray on October 24, 2006, by Paramount Home Entertainment. The film was released on 4K Ultra HD Blu-ray on December 9, 2025.

During its opening weekend, Nacho Libre grossed $28,309,599, opening at #2 behind Cars' second weekend. The total domestic box office stands at $80,197,993 and a worldwide total of $99,255,460.

The film received mixed reviews from critics. On Rotten Tomatoes, the film has an approving rating of 39% based on 165 reviews, with an average rating of 5.1/10. The website's critical consensus states: "At times hilarious, but other times offensive, director Jared Hess is unable to recapture the collective charisma of his Napoleon Dynamite characters, and instead, relies on a one-joke concept that runs out of steam. Sure to entertain the adolescents, however". Metacritic gave the film a score of 52 out of 100, based on 36 reviews, indicating "mixed or average reviews". Audiences polled by CinemaScore gave the film an average grade of "B+" on an A+ to F scale.

Roger Ebert of the Chicago Sun-Times wrote: "It takes some doing to make a Jack Black comedy that doesn't work, but Nacho Libre does it". Mick LaSalle of the San Francisco Chronicle thought the comedy was "hit and miss, with good bits interrupted by dead patches". Manohla Dargis of The New York Times gave it a positive review and called it "endearingly ridiculous".

== Video game ==
A video game adaptation of the film was published by Majesco and was released for the Nintendo DS on October 26, 2006. It is a cartoon-style wrestling game based upon the film.

== Future ==
In November 2006, Black, when asked, expressed his interest in a sequel: "I sure hope so, I love working with Jared. I think it's a good bet that we'll collaborate on something again. Mike had an idea that it would be Nacho goes to Japan, we'll see though." However, Jared Hess (who directed the film) revealed in October 2009 that Paramount had never approached him about doing a sequel to Nacho Libre, though he said he would "love to work with Black again". Hess and Black would later collaborate again on A Minecraft Movie (2025).
