= Isidro Baldenegro López =

- Born: c. 1966
- Died: 15 January 2017 (aged 50–51)
- Citizenship: Mexican
- Occupations: Farmer; Community leader Environmentalist
- Awards: Goldman Environment Prize (2005)

Isidro Baldenegro López (c. 1966 – 15 January 2017) was a farmer and community leader of Mexico's indigenous Tarahumara people in Sierra Madre and an environmental activist who fought against unregulated logging in his region.

== Early life ==
Baldenegro grew up in his ancestral land in the Sierra Madre mountains, a region known for its biodiversity. His father was assassinated after he took a stand against logging, and Isidro was a witness.

== Work ==
Baldenegro was active in his defense of the ecosystem in Sierra Madre where his community has been living for hundreds of years. He founded an NGO in 1993 to combat deforestation. He organized community marches and blockades that caused a temporary shut-down of logging by the government in 2002. In 2003, he organized a protest with wives of murdered activists which led to the banning of logging by court ruling.

After being arrested in 2003, López was adopted as a prisoner of conscience by Amnesty International and was released after 15 months in prison, being acquitted of all charges.

He was awarded the Goldman Environmental Prize in 2005 for his nonviolent efforts to defend old growth forests from devastating logging. As of January 2017, this prize has been awarded to 4 Mexican activists, including Baldenegro. Goldman Environmental Foundation's president said that Baldenegro's "relentless work organizing peaceful protests against illegal logging in the Sierra Madre mountains helped protect the forests, lands and rights of his people. He was a fearless leader and a source of inspiration to so many people fighting to protect our environment and indigenous peoples."

== Death ==
Baldenegro was assassinated on January 15, 2017. His relatives have said that his murder is connected to other killings and attacks on indigenous people who have opposed logging in the region. The Guardian noted that his death came just months after Berta Cáceres, who also won the Goldman Environmental Prize, was assassinated. 122 environmental activists were killed in Latin America in 2015, and 185 were killed worldwide.

Organizers of the Goldman Environmental Prize stated they "denounce his murder in the strongest possible terms" and called on the Government of Mexico "to conduct a speedy, independent and transparent investigation into his death, and to do all within its powers to bring the perpetuators to justice."
