= Katy Gutiérrez Muñoz =

Spanish politician (born 1952)

Katy Gutiérrez Muñoz (born in Bilbao, 1952) is a Spanish politician from the Basque region and a member of the Basque Parliament from 30 November 1994 to 1 September 1998 as a member of the Izquierda Unida/Ezker Batua (IU-EB) coalition party. She served as a member of the Commission on Education and Culture from 1995 to 1998 and a member of the Parliamentary Control Committee from 1995 to 1997.
