= Carlos Gutiérrez Ruiz =

Mexican politician (born 1963)

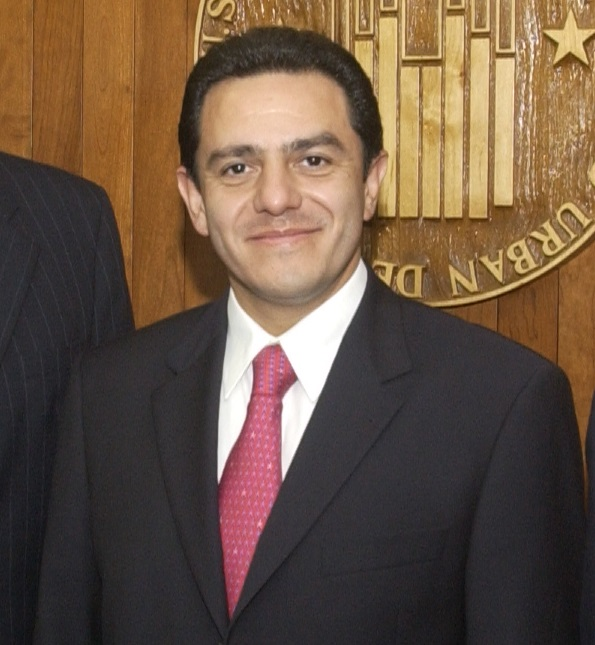
Carlos Gutiérrez Ruiz in 2003

Carlos Gutiérrez Ruíz (born 1963 in Mexico City) is a Mexican politician. He is Director General of the National Housing Commission of Mexico (Spanish: Comisión Nacional de Vivienda).

From 1992 to 1994 he was President of the Coordinating Council of the Metal Mechanics Industry. From 1994 to 1996 he was vice president of CANACINTRA, and served as president until 1998. From 1997 to 1999 he was national vice president of the Confederation of Industrial Chambers of Mexico (CONCAMIN).

He has served as a member of the Board of Directors of Nacional Financiera and Banco del Comercio Exterior and the Executive Commission of the Business Coordination Council. He has led business missions to Canada, Germany, Guatemala, Japan, Nicaragua and the United States. He has studied industry specializations, such as foundry technology in Detroit, Michigan, in the United States, and transformation of small- to medium-sized firms in Yokohama, Japan.

In 2003, he was appointed Director General of the National Housing Commission (CONAFOVI). In December 2006, President Felipe Calderón confirmed Carlos Gutiérrez as Director General of the National Housing Commission, an institution which, as a result of the new legislation, is a decentralized, non-sectoral organization, and a legal entity with its own assets.
