= Romayne Wheeler =

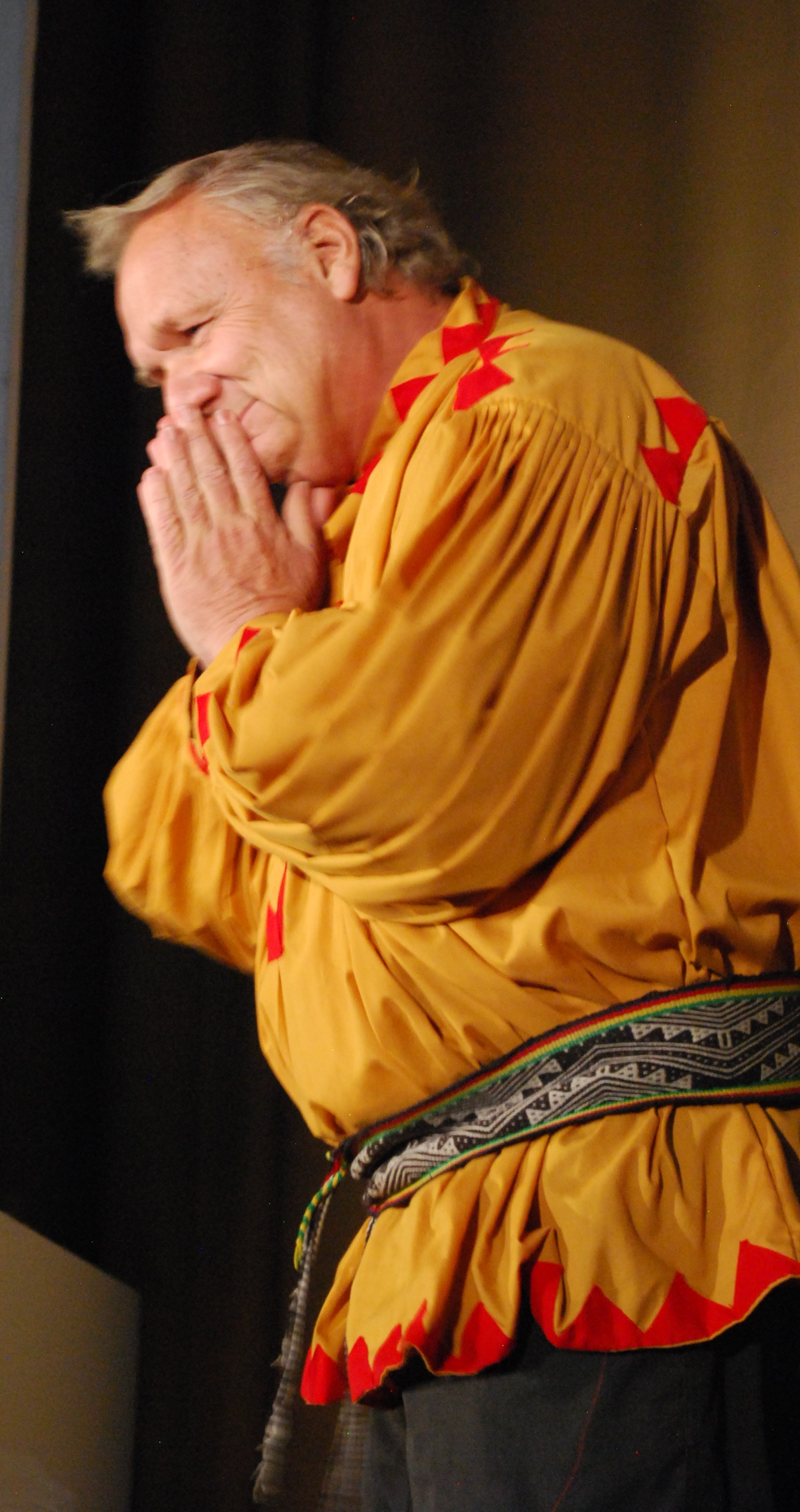
- Wheeler at a concert at the Tec de Monterrey, Mexico City

Background information
- Born: 1942 (age 83–84); St Helena, California, United States
- Instrument: piano
- Years active: 1968-present
- Website: Romayne Wheeler Foundation

Romayne Wheeler (born 1942) is an American concert pianist, composer, writer and researcher who is best known for life and work with the Tarahumara people in the Mexican state of Chihuahua. While born in California, Wheeler has lived in various parts of the world, initially because of his father's work and later due to his own career as a pianist. In 1980, Wheeler became interested in the Sierra Tarahumara and its people due to photos in a National Geographic magazine. He spent months out of the year studying the music and dance of the Tarahumara and in 1992, decided to live permanently in this very remote area, bringing his piano with him. Wheeler remains an active musician, touring for part of the year. He dedicates most of his income in support of the Tarahumara.

== Life ==
Wheeler was born in 1942 in St. Helena, California. However, he was there only until age two because he was born into a family that moved frequently. His father worked with the United Nations (FAO) and was a Seventh-day Adventist missionary, which gave the young Wheeler experience in Latin American and indigenous communities in Arizona. He stayed in Mexico during his adolescence and was in the Dominican Republic. He also lived 32 years in Austria .

Wheeler began playing the piano as a child with his first musical influences being from Latin America, especially the Dominican Republic.

His parents sent him to high school in Arizona, and he finished this level in Monterey, California. In 1961, he went to Austria to study music full-time, spending twelve years to obtain his degree as a composer in 1968 from the Vienna University of Music and as a concert pianist in 1972 from the Vienna Conservatory of Music.

== Career ==
He is a composer, poet, painter, musicologist and writer. Since 1968 he has performed in 51 countries such as Austria, Italy, Germany, Switzerland, Hungary, Spain, England, France, Serbia, Slovenia, Greece, Crete, Israel, Lebanon, Cypress, Libya, Thailand, Nepal, Taiwan, China, Japan, Canada, the US, Mexico and Peru. These performances include major concert halls in Europe and the Americas and regularly appears in Vienna.

As a visual artist he paints and draws, using the same calligraphy pens he uses to write music. His artworks have been exhibited, often in combination with a concert.

He remains active as a concert pianist and composer and is best known for dedicating his musical career to helping the indigenous residents of the Sierra Tarahumara.

== Life in the Sierra Tarahumara ==
In the 1970s, Wheeler decided to return to the United States to study indigenous music and dance, especially that of the Hopi, Navajo and Pima in Arizona. In 1980, he was prevented from going to Hopi communities near the Grand Canyon by a blizzard, forcing him to stay at a hotel in Albuquerque. In this hotel, he found a National Geographic issue with photos of the Sierra Tarahumara taken by Rev. Luis Verplancken, which inspired him to learn about the Tarahumara and the Copper Canyon area.

He arrived later in the year, guided only by a map with a few Tarahumara words, to document indigenous music for the Vienna University of Music. While hiking through the mountain, he met his first local family who were on their way to buy supplies. They were eating and he joined them.

He fell in love with the area and its people, which have changed relatively little despite the influence of the Spanish and modern technology. He has since been accepted by the Tarahumara of the community of Munerachi, which consists of over 380 families in scattered homesteads. From 1980 to 1992 he came each year to spend two months, writing and studying Tarahumara music and dance, while living in a local cave. During these times he brought a solar powered piano, which he used to help break the ice between locals and himself. While initially distrustful of the unfamiliar instrument, the Tarahumara eventually called what it played “water music,” with water being an important element in their lives. He also composed new piano pieces based on Tarahumara music, traditionally played on violins and sound similar to Scottish jigs.

In 1992, Wheeler decided to live in the Sierra Tarahumara permanently. His reason was that he felt that his career was becoming repetitive and “robotic,” having played all the venues he had wanted. He built a house of stone on a cliff overlooking a ravine in the municipality of Batopilas. It is 1,500 meters above the review in the ravine and he can see as far as Choix, Sinaloa . The house is connected only by dirt road to the nearest significant town, Creel, and depending on conditions, takes between five and seven hours to travel. To live there, Wheeler needed his piano, a 1917 Steinway and Sons grand piano, which belonged to the Teatro Degollado in Guadalajara and had been played by Arthur Rubenstein and Claudio Arrau . Wheeler hired a small truck to carry the piano and lined it with fifteen mattresses and four tons of potatoes to protect the instrument. The trip took seventeen hours, including the last leg which required the carrying of the piano by eighteen Tarahumara men, who were paid with the potatoes in the truck. The piano arrived to the site without a scratch. The site of the house is called the “Eagle’s Nest” but local also call it “pianchi” or place of the piano. Wheeler spends part of the year traveling and performing and the rest in this house. Here, the musician says he feels closer to God and it is a refuge where he rehearses, composes, writes and paints.

Wheeler dedicates most of his income from concerts and record sales to the Tarahumara with the rest to his subsistence. From 1985 to 2000 his donations went to support the St Teresita Clinic in Creel, run by the same Rev. Luis Verplancken whose photographs appeared in the National Geographic article. Since 2000, he has run his own nonprofit organization dedicated to the medical and educational needs of the region. The work of this organization includes the Retosachi Medical Center, which takes care of over 400 families, and Wheeler has convinced the Austrian government to sponsor a school for the Munerachi community. He says his work is only a drop compared to what is needed, especially during drought years when crops fail and there is widespread hunger.

He feels that the Sierra Tarahumara is his home and the Tarahumara his people, although Wheeler stands out with his height, complexion and blue eyes. He wears Tarahumara shirts and huaraches for his concerts, which he began in 1985 at the suggestion of his Tarahumara neighbor, Juanito. His first Tarahumara piano pupil was his godson, Romeyno Gutierrez Luna. Romeyno went on to study at the Chihuahua Conservatory and has performed and both Mexico and the United States. In early 2014, the two toured Europe together.

In 2013 Wheeler was awarded the “Real Heroes of Mexico” award by The MEXICO Report.
