= Lizette Gutierrez =

Songwriter and musician

- Also known as: San Cha
- Born: 1987 or 1988 (age 36–37); San Jose, California
- Genres: Ranchera
- Occupation: Singer-songwriter

Lizette Anabelle Gutierrez (born 1987/88) is a songwriter and musician. She performs traditional Mexican ranchera music under the name San Cha, a combination of "Saint" and "mistress".

== Biography ==
Gutierrez started playing the flute at age 10 and played her first guitar when she was 13. She left the Bay Area due to financial hardships and moved to her aunt's home in Jalisco, Mexico. In Mexico, she found inspiration and developed one of her first albums, Me Demandó - DEMOS in 2016. Later, she wrote La Luz de la Esperanza which combines queer club jams with the ranchera style.

== Art ==
From her experiences living in the Bay Area to moving to a much simpler life with her aunt in Mexico, her collective experiences have prompted her to release another album titled Capricho Del Diablo, which speaks out on oppression towards minorities and a personal story of how she almost got taken advantage of by her mentor. This inspired her to create a more rebellious and softer version of the ranchera style based on the telenovelas she watched in her childhood. In 2019, the Red Bull Music Academy scouted her to perform at the Los Angeles music festival. During performances, she often wears clothes created by the artist Olima with colorful feathers and flowers.
