= Carlos Gutiérrez (diplomat) =

Honduran diplomat and writer (1818–1882)

Carlos Gutiérrez was a Honduran diplomat and writer (Tegucigalpa Honduras 1818 - San Sebastián, Spain 1882). From 1848 on, he worked for several Central American countries in the United States of America and was the Honduran consul to Great Britain. In 1873 he was sent to Spain to communicate Costa Rica and Guatemalan governments recognition to the Spanish Republic. In 1878 he saw his biography on Bartolomé de las Casas published, with a preface by Spanish former prime minister Emilio Castelar.
