= Grace Gutierrez =

Chicana artist

Grace Gutierrez is a Chicana artist known for her work across multiple artistic mediums, including painting, ceramics, video art, photography, and murals. Her artistic practice explores themes of Chicana/o identity, environmental consciousness, the connection between animals and femininity, and the experiences of small-town life. Through her work, Gutierrez incorporates symbolic imagery from Indigenous Mexican cultures, such as the turtle totem, to explore the interconnectedness between nature, culture, and identity. She graduated from Metropolitan State University of Denver in Spring 2020 with a Bachelor of Fine Arts (BFA), emphasizing painting and ceramics.

*Aside from her artwork, Grace Gutierrez has contributed time and work into curatorial projects and galleries around areas in Colorado. Similarly to her paintings and ceramics, her artwork in these exhibitions are community based where we get to dive deep into Latino history, cultural identities, and sense of belonging. Unanticipated, Grace Gutierrez displayed Look At Us Now, in 2025 at the Boulder Museum of Contemporary Art.

== Biography ==
Grace Gutierrez was born and raised in Longmont, Colorado and continues to live there. From a young age, Gutierrez grew very fond of art and in high school it become clear to her that it was something she wanted to consider and pursue as a career. After a seven-year break from education, Gutierrez returned to school in 2017 and enrolled at Front Range Community College, where she received her Associate of Arts in 2018. She continued her education at Metro State University located in Denver and received her Bachelor of Fine Arts in 2020. While Gutierrez works across various artistic mediums, she is particularly focused on ceramics and painting. Her works blend her Chicana heritage with contemporary themes of environmentalism and identity.

*In 2017, Grace Gutierrez became an intern for the Firehouse Art Center in Longmont, Colorado. While being an intern, Gutierrez was able to assemble and take part in "Our Past and Present", a Dia De Los Muertos display at the Firehouse Art Center. The focus of this piece work is to examine and dive deep into the Latino experiences. When examining history of Longmont through these experiences, Grace was able to get artists such as Adrian Raya, Cal Duran, Javier Flores, and Ramon Trujillo featured in these pieces. This Mexican tradition was able to showcase ofrendas, which celebrated individuals to the local Latino community.

== Artistic Practice ==
Gutierrez’s work draws heavily from her Chicana identity and Mexican cultural heritage. She often incorporates elements of Indigenous symbolism, such as the turtle totem, to reflect on the sacred relationship between the Earth and its inhabitants. The turtle, a figure deeply ingrained in many Mesoamerican mythologies, represents both Mother Earth and the passage of time. In her art, turtles serve as guides that warn of environmental shifts, particularly climate change, giving her work a dual purpose: to explore cultural narratives and advocate for environmental consciousness.

In addition to these themes, Gutierrez’s art explores the intersection of animal symbolism and femininity. Her depictions of women in the natural world suggest a deeper connection between the feminine and the Earth, emphasizing themes of nurturing, protection, and transformation. Her use of playful and sentimental narratives reflects both the vulnerability and strength within her identity and culture.

*You are also able to see a change in artwork. Gutierrez's artistic practices have extended into different materials, textures, and symbolic pieces. It was quite evident through her 2025 exhibition Look At Us Now, we are able to acknowledge experiences such as struggle, vulnerability, reminisce, and resilience. We are displayed with coyotes, cacti, and flamingos, where they play a larger role than just animals, there's a meaningful representation. These

== Art (murals, projects, ceramics) ==
- Mujer de Las Tortugas (Woman of the Turtles): This mural is one of Gutierrez’s most well-known pieces. It depicts a central female figure surrounded by turtles in the ocean. The design was inspired by the belief of ancient Indigenous Mexican tribes, which viewed the turtle as a symbol of the Earth. Turtles were believed to carry the planet on their backs, representing a motherly figure that nurtures and protects life. Through this mural, Gutierrez conveys a message of environmental stewardship, urging people to appreciate and care for the planet.
- * This mural can be found on a barn in an alley behind 2029 Mapleton Avenue in Boulder, Colorado. The meaning behind this murals is meant to represent a connection between Earth, passage of time, and environmental change. Gutierrez goal was to shine light and encourage her audience to recognize the danger in climate change and appreciate our world by protecting the natural environment.
- Yo Soy Animal (I Am Animal) is a series of different paintings made with acrylic paint, with the addition of accompanying ceramic works to them. In their essence it captures the Chicana experience and explores various aspects such as Mexican folklore and literature. It includes the depiction of animals alongside the female figures within the paintings, that add to the overall meaning of the piece as there is an existing symbolism of the animal, that then contributes the message of the artist.
  - Paintings and Installations:
    - Iguanas-Tribute to Iturbide
    - Dog-Loyal Guide
    - Resplendent Quetzal
    - Jaguar
    - Ceramic Works:
      - Iguanas: Created in 2020, this ceramic piece features three detailed iguanas painted in vibrant greens, blues, and yellows, showcasing Gutierrez’s skill in blending natural forms with artistic expression.
      - Sleeping Dogs: Another ceramic work created in 2020, Sleeping Dogs depicts a brown dog curled up in a restful position. This piece explores themes of comfort, rest, and loyalty through its tender portrayal of an animal in repose.
- FC Mural Project: In 2020, Gutierrez participated in the FC Mural Project in Fort Collins, Colorado. The mural features vibrant colors and depicts a woman surrounded by two green birds, one of which rests near her hand. The mural reflects Gutierrez’s signature style, blending symbolic imagery with bold colors to convey themes of connection and harmony with nature.
