= Donald Gutierrez =

American writer

Donald Kenneth Gutierrez (March 10, 1932 – October 29, 2013) was an American writer and professor emeritus of English literature.

== Biography ==
The eldest son of Latin-American immigrants, he was born in Oakland, California, in 1932. He taught at the University of Notre Dame and the Western New Mexico University in Silver City, New Mexico. He studied English literature at University of California, Berkeley in the early 1950s. Gutierrez left Berkeley in 1958 to pursue a career at the Metropolitan Museum of Art Library in New York, and wound up at book publisher Grosset & Dunlap.

He returned to California to receive a PhD from UCLA in 1964 and later joined the Notre Dame English department. Gutierrez returned to Notre Dame on a research scholarship, shortly before finishing a book on Kenneth Rexroth that renowned former Notre Dame president and head, Reverend ("Father") Theodore M. Hesburgh, placed in Notre Dame's Hesburgh Library (Special Collection).

== Career ==
Gutierrez was a scholar of D. H. Lawrence, and wrote about the last period (late 1920s) of Lawrence, whom Gutierrez describes as having dealt with death and symbolic renewal in an "ontological" manner, a lens through which Lawrence offered keen insights into humankind and society. An erstwhile Berkeley student who observed the "bohemian-literati" world in the 1950s, Gutierrez has also written memoirs and commentaries on the "Beat" scenes of Berkeley and San Francisco. Gutierrez also produced many works on Kenneth Rexroth and other writers of that time.

Gutierrez' post-2000 work and writings moved away from an academic focus of literature and fine arts, and he latterly wrote articles and essays more as a social and political commentator, with topics of: social justice, human rights abuses, economic inequities, and the major role he feels U.S. domestic and foreign policy plays in these. He was an outspoken critic of political repression, international war criminals (Chile's Augusto Pinochet, Guatemala's Efraín Ríos Montt, Nicaragua's Somoza, Panama's Manuel Noriega, etc.), the United States' "School of the Americas" (the Department of Defense's Spanish-speaking training facility), the U.S. military engagements in Iraq, Bosnia, Vietnam, the current torture and imprisonment practices the U.S. is claimed to participate in (including "extraordinary rendition" and "dark cells") and the policies of the administrations of Presidents Richard Nixon, George H. W. Bush, Bill Clinton, and George W. Bush.

Gutierrez wrote six books, more than 100 essays, papers and book reviews. He contributed numerous essays to journals, newspapers, universities, and online publishers, including the El Dorado Sun, the North Dakota Quarterly, Progressive San Francisco Latino newspaper, El Tecolote, the D. H. Lawrence Review, The Malahat Review, the University of California's "California Alumni Association", Mosaic, Review of Existential Psychology and Psychiatry, Texas Quarterly, Twentieth Century Literature, and Studies in Short Fiction.

== Works ==
=== Books by Gutierrez ===
- Feeling the Unthinkable: Essays on Social Justice; 2012; Amador Publishers, LLC ISBN 978-0-938513-44-5
- "The Holiness of the Real": The Short Poetry of Kenneth Rexroth; 1st Edition 1966; Fairleigh Dickinson University Press ISBN 978-0-8386-3651-0 (out of print). 2nd Edition 2014; Amador Publishers, LLC ISBN 978-0-938513-51-3
- Lapsing Out: Embodiments of Death and Rebirth in the Last Writings of D. H. Lawrence; 1980; Fairleigh Dickinson University Press ISBN 978-0-8386-2293-3
- The Maze in the Mind and the World: Labyrinths in Modern Literature; 1985; Whitston Publishing Co. ISBN 978-0-87875-293-5
- The Dark and Light Gods: Essays on the Self in Modern Literature; 1987; Whitston Publishing Co. ISBN 978-0-87875-339-0
- Subject-object relations in Wordsworth and Lawrence (Studies in modern literature); 1987; UMI Research Press ISBN 978-0-8357-1781-6
- Breaking Through to the Other Side: Essays on Realization in Modern Literature; 1994; Whitston Publishing Co. ISBN 978-0-87875-435-9
- Feeling the Unthinkable: Essays on Social Justice; 2012; Amador Publishers, LLC ISBN 978-0-938513-44-5

=== Essays and articles by Gutierrez ===
- Maker, Worker, Profit-Maker 1977; WNMU Dept. of Language and Literature; New Mexico Endowment for Humanities Records (Scholar's paper)
- T. V. Sports Commentary and the Corruption of Language 1978; WNMU Dept. of Language and Literature; New Mexico Endowment for Humanities Records (Scholar's paper)
- The Rites of Passage and Adolescence in Modern Society 1978; WNMU Dept. of Language and Literature; New Mexico Endowment for Humanities Records; (Scholar's paper)
- Girlie Magazines 1979; WNMU Dept. of Language and Literature; New Mexico Endowment for Humanities Records (Scholar's paper)
- The Hylozoistic Vision of Lady Chatterley's Lover; 1981
- Maker versus profit-maker: B. Traven’s "Assembly line; 1980
- The ideas of place : D. H. Lawrence’s travel books; 1981
- Poetry can make even tough concepts endurable and enduring; 1982
- Quick, now, here, now, always : the flaming rose of Lawrence and Eliot; 1982
- Toughness is an overrated term being used among Americans; 1984
- Incarceration and torture : the self in extremity ] 1985; Human Rights Quarterly; Johns Hopkins University
- A Life of Kenneth Rexroth - R Book Reviews 1993; The Literary Review Magazine
- American Presidents and Business Versus Community 1996; "Common Sense;" Univ. of Notre Dame
- On Rexroth's Poetry ; 1999; "Modern American Poetry;" University of Illinois at Urbana-Champaign
- Bohemian Berkeley; 2002; UC "California Alumni Association"
- “Where Is the Humanity?” America's Use of Excessive Force Over There; 2002
- Systemic Greed: Kozlowski and Beyond 2003; El Tecolote
- Patriotism and Country Versus State 2003; El Tecolote
- The Preposterously Expensive Military of America 2004; El Tecolote
- Making Politicians Accountable ; 2004; El Dorado Sun Guest Editorial
- Leveling the Hierarchy ; 2005; El Dorado Sun Guest Editorial
- On State Political Torture ; 2005; Tikkun
- The Extraordinary Cruelty of "Extraordinary Rendition ; (PDF); 2006; Amer. Humanist Society; 2005; El Dorado Sun
- Poetry Review: Often I Am Permitted to Return to a Meadow; Robert Duncan; ; Modern American Poetry (Co-authors: Carey Nelson, Norman M. Finklestein, Christopher Beach)
- Doctoral dissertation: study of A Dance to the Music of Time; Anthony Powell

=== Book reviews by Gutierrez ===
==== Dates are review dates ====
- Rogue State by William Blum; 2001; Review:
- The New Nuclear Danger: George W. Bush’s Military-Industrial Complex by Dr. Helen Caldicott; 2002
- War is a Force That Gives Us Meaning by Chris Hedges; 2003; Review:
- The Blindfold’s Eyes: My Journey from Torture to Truth by Dianna Ortiz; 2003; Z-Magazine; Review:
- State Terrorism and the United States by Frederick H. Gareau; 2004

=== Papers by Gutierrez in Spanish ===
- El costo del ejército militar estadounidense 2004; El Tecolote
- Avaricia en el Sistema: Kozlowski y el futuro ; 2003; El Tecolote
- Patriotismo y nación versus estado ; 2003; El Tecolote

== Lectures, readings by Gutierrez ==
- Harwood Museum of Art Poetry and Passion, Three Major Early Modern British Poets (Taos, New Mexico) 10 Nov. 2005
- National Poetry Month Events (Cannon, New Mexico)
- New Mexico Endowment for the Humanities; University of New Mexico; Speakers/Programs; 1986; 1988; 1991-1992

== Honors, awards ==
- Western New Mexico University Department of Humanities Professor Emeritus

== Related links ==
- Catalog of Works by Donald Gutierrez in University of Notre Dame Library (14 works)
- Bilingual Essays by Donald Gutierrez (English and Spanish); El Tecolote; cerca 2003-2004
- Richard Brautigan Collection; Bibliographic reference ; Berkeley Review; 1957
- ‘Ghosts Benefic and Malign: The Influence of the “Noh” Theatre on the Three Dance Plays of Yeats’. ; Forum (Houston) 9/2; 1971: pp. 42–48; Donald Gutierrez
- The Ancient Imagination of D. H. Lawrence ; Twentieth Century Literature; Vol. 27, No. 2, pp. 178–196; 1981; Donald Gutierrez
- Flower Wreath Hill: Later Poems by Kenneth Rexroth; Linda Hamalian (Ed.); 1992 (Western Literature Association; Utah State University)
- Revolutionary Rexroth: Poet of East West Wisdom (Morgan Gibson)
- Rexroth, Kenneth (Bibliographic reference—Rexroth biography study)
- The Relevance of Rexroth ; 2004 (Bibliography)
- Reviews of Bohemian Berkeley 2002
- Poetry and Therapy (Louise Cowan, PhD) 2004
- Breaking through to the other side Brief synopsis; ISBNdb.com
- Place and Space Bibliographic reference
