= Rochelle Gutierrez =

Professor of education

Rochelle Gutierrez is a professor of education at the University of Illinois at Urbana–Champaign. Her main focus is changing the way in which mathematics is taught to the minority and the effects of race, class and language on teaching and learning.

== Early life and education ==
Gutierrez is from San Jose, California. She attended Stanford University and received her bachelor's degree in human biology in 1990. She then moved to the University of Chicago, where she earned a master's degree in social sciences and a PhD in education. Her doctoral research was centered on equity in teaching mathematics.

== Career ==
Gutierrez has been working at the University of Illinois at Urbana–Champaign since 1996. Her main focus is on how intersectionality can play a role when learning mathematics. Some of her research is based on how to better teach underprivileged students mathematics and how teachers and professors can better assist the students. Gutierrez has also researched how mathematics can impact a student's power and place in society. On a website, Campus Reform, she is quoted as saying, "On many levels, mathematics itself operates as Whiteness. Who gets credit for doing and developing mathematics, who is capable in mathematics, and who is seen as part of the mathematical community is generally viewed as White".

== Awards ==
In 2010 she was given the Outstanding Faculty Award for Service at UIUC.

In 2011 Gutierrez received the Association of Mathematics Teacher Educators award, which is an organization that recognizes teachers who are dedicated to improving Mathematical education.

In 2016 she was awarded the Iris M. Carl Equity and Leadership Award (TODOS Mathematics).

In 2017 Gutierrez received the Social Justice Award, which is given to those who spend of their time helping minorities.

For the school year 2018-2019 Gutierrez received the Outstanding Undergraduate Teaching Award at the University of Illinois-Urbana.
