= Fray Tormenta =

Mexican Catholic priest and lucha libre wrestler (born 1945)

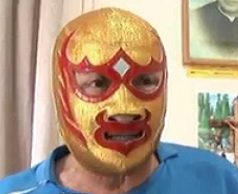
- Fray Tormenta in 2011

Personal information
- Born: Sergio Gutiérrez Benítez; May 9, 1945 (age 81) San Agustín Metzquititlán, Hidalgo, Mexico

Professional wrestling career
- Ring name: Fray Tormenta
- Billed height: 1.78 m (5 ft 10 in)
- Billed weight: 105 kg (231 lb)
- Debut: 1973
- Retired: July 3, 2011

Sergio Gutiérrez Benítez (born May 9, 1945) is a Mexican Catholic priest who founded and supported an orphanage for 23 years as a professional wrestler. While performing, he wore a red and yellow mask and used the ring name Fray Tormenta ("Friar Storm"). He made only sporadic in-ring appearances in the 2000s before retiring completely from professional wrestling in July 2011, but he still wears his mask even in his duties as a priest.

== Biography ==
Dutch documentary segment on Fray Tormenta, 2011

Sergio Gutiérrez Benítez was born to José Gutiérrez García and Emilia Benítez on May 9, 1945, in San Agustín Metzquititlán, Hidalgo as the sixteenth of their seventeen children. He had long been inspired to become a masked professional wrestler after watching two 1963 Mexican films, El Señor Tormenta (Mister Storm) and Tormenta En El Ring (Storm In The Ring) both of which featured the story of a poor Mexican priest who supported the children of his orphanage by fighting as a professional wrestler at night. At age 22, Gutiérrez, at the time a drug addict and alcoholic, became interested in the priesthood and was inducted into the Piarists Order. His theological training took him to Rome, and then Spain, and for a while he taught philosophy and history at Roman Catholic universities in Mexico. He later became a secular priest in the Diocese of Texcoco, where he founded an orphanage named "La Casa Hogar de los Cachorros de Fray Tormenta", which would serve as the home of 270 children. In need of money to take care of the children, the father became the masked wrestler known as Fray Tormenta.

In 1991, French filmmakers made a movie loosely based on his life called L'Homme au masque d'or (The Man In The Golden Mask) starring Jean Reno.

In 2006, American film maker Jared Hess made another film based on the story of Fray Tormenta called Nacho Libre, starring Jack Black. The Paramount film was produced by Jack Black, Mike White, and David Klawans.

In 2007, Fray Tormenta appeared in the film Padre Tormenta as a priest who dons the wrestlers mask and enters the ring to raise funds for the orphanage he directs.

Currently, Fray Tormenta stars as a supporting character in the Mexican comic book series Místico: El Principe de Plata y Oro as a mentor to the lucha libre wrestler Místico.

In real life, although Fray Tormenta is now retired from professional wrestling, he still works at the orphanage as a priest and has inspired one of his children to take up his mantle so that the legend of Fray Tormenta can live on. The masked wrestler, whose real name is unknown, calls himself Fray Tormenta Jr. Although semi-retired from wrestling since 2001, he still wrestled occasionally and on January 11, 2011, won his second Lucha de Apuesta, by defeating Bugambilia, Super Crazy, X-Fly, Bestia 666 and Boy Danger, to win Bugambilia's hair. On July 3, 2011, Tormenta teamed with El Pantera and Solar to defeat Black Terry, Negro Navarro and Scorpio, Jr. at International Wrestling Revolution Group's Festival de las Mascaras. After the match Gutiérrez announced that he had wrestled his final match. On June 20, 2012, Tormenta made an appearance for Consejo Mundial de Lucha Libre (CMLL), officially giving his blessing to the second incarnation of Místico.

== In popular culture ==
The video game characters King from Tekken, Crasher Wake from Pokémon, Tizoc from Fatal Fury, Leon from F-Zero, and Greco from Chrono Cross were inspired by his story, as were the movies Nacho Libre with Jack Black playing Ignacio/Nacho as the Fray Tormenta inspired character and the French film L'Homme au masque d'or (fr) with Jean Reno playing Father Victorio Gaetano.

== Luchas de Apuestas record ==
Winner (wager)	Loser (wager)	Location	Event	Date	Notes
Fray Tormenta (mask)	El Hijo de Judas (mask)	Nuevo Laredo, Tamaulipas	Live event	November 18, 1990	
Fray Tormenta (mask)	Bugambilia (hair)	Pachuca, Hidalgo	Live event	January 11, 2011	(Note: Six–way match, also involving Super Crazy, X-Fly, Bestia 666 and Boy Danger.)
