= Sergio Gutiérrez (footballer) =

Colombian footballer (born 1989)

Personal information
- Full name: Serrgio Manuel Gutiérrez
- Date of birth: 28 May 1989 (age 37)
- Place of birth: Bogotá, Colombia
- Height: 1.85 m (6 ft 1 in)
- Position: Goalkeeper

Team information
- Current team: Millonarios
- Number: 12

Senior career*
Years	Team	Apps	(Gls)
2008	Millonarios		
- * Club domestic league appearances and goals as of 27 March 2008

Sergio Manuel Gutiérrez (born 28 May 1989) is a Colombian football goalkeeper, who currently plays for Millonarios in the Copa Mustang. Gutiérrez is a product of the Millonarios youth system and played with the Millonarios first team since January 2008.
