= Sinikka Sipilä =

Finnish librarian

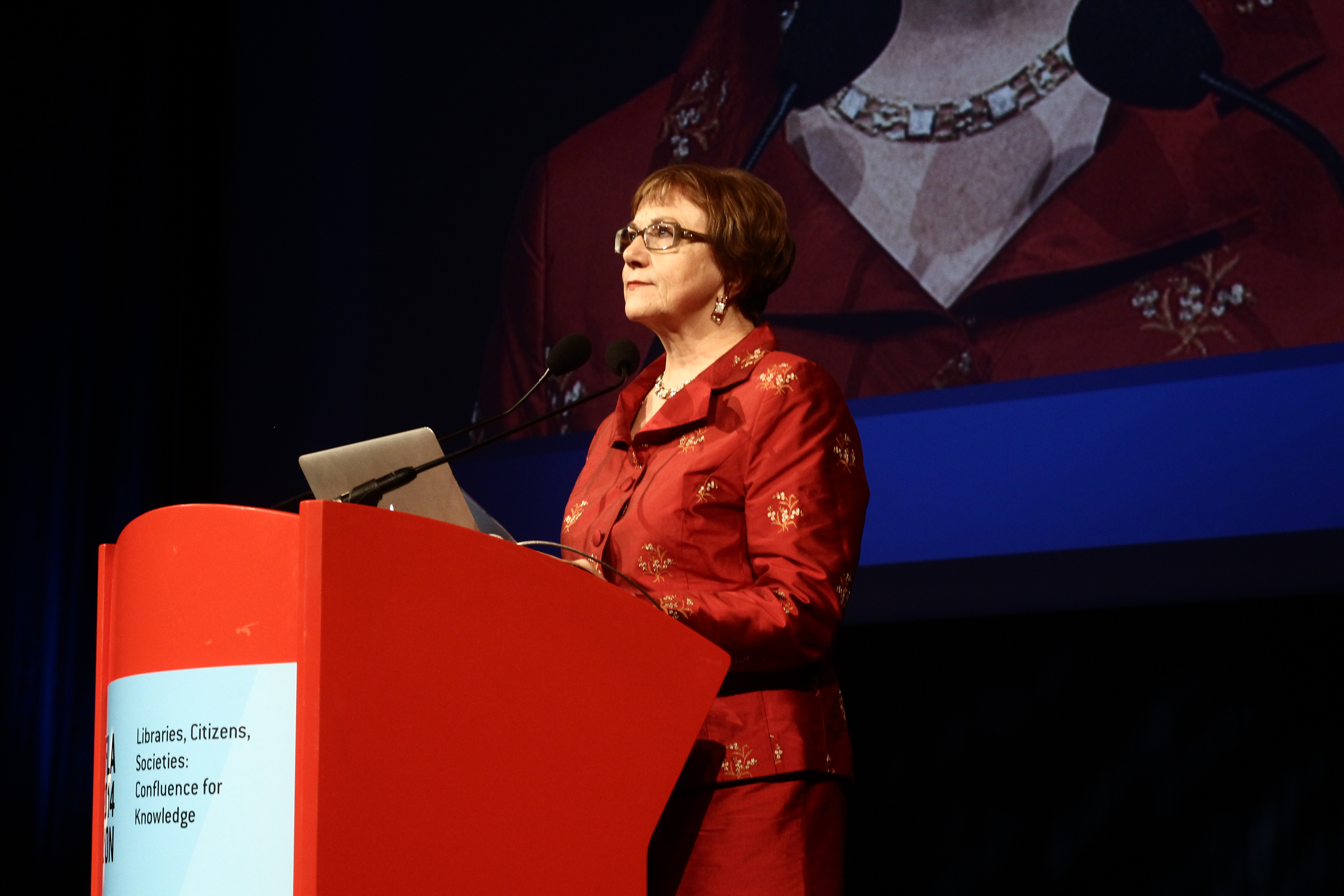
- Sinikka Sipilä in 2014

President of the International Federation of Library Associations
- Incumbent
- Assumed office 2013
- Preceded by: Ingrid Parent
- Succeeded by: Donna Scheeder

Personal details
- Born: 3 September 1951 (age 73); Finland
- Occupation: Librarian

Sinikka Sipilä (born 3 September 1951) is a Finnish librarian, president of the International Federation of Library Associations and Institutions - IFLA from 2013 to 2015 overseeing the Lyon Declaration global petition connecting library associations and librarians with the priorities of the UN Sustainable Development Goals. Sipilä was IFLA president elect 2011–2013 and a member of the governing board from 2007–2011 and held the position of secretary general of the Finnish Library Association 1997–2015.

== Early life ==
Sipilä studied at Tampere University to gain a Master in Social Sciences, Library Science and Informatics.

== Career ==
Sipilä worked as librarian at Hämeenlinna City Library and the University of Tampere and later as manager of library cooperation with countries like Tanzania, Philippines, South Africa, Namibia, Senegal and Ghana and represented the Finnish library field at the World Summit on the Information Society - WSIS.

=== Finnish Library Association ===
Sipilä held the position of secretary general of the Finnish Library Association from 1997–2015 and was co-chair of the IFLA World Library and Information Congress 2012 in Helsinki.

=== The International Federation of Library Associations and Institutions ===
Sipilä held numerous committee roles for the International Federation of Library Associations and Institutions (IFLA) including member of the Standing Committee and Chair of Management of Library Associations Section (MLAS); IFLA delegation to the UN World Summit on the Information Society (WSIS); on the IFLA Governing Board 2007–2013; and as IFLA President 2013–2015.

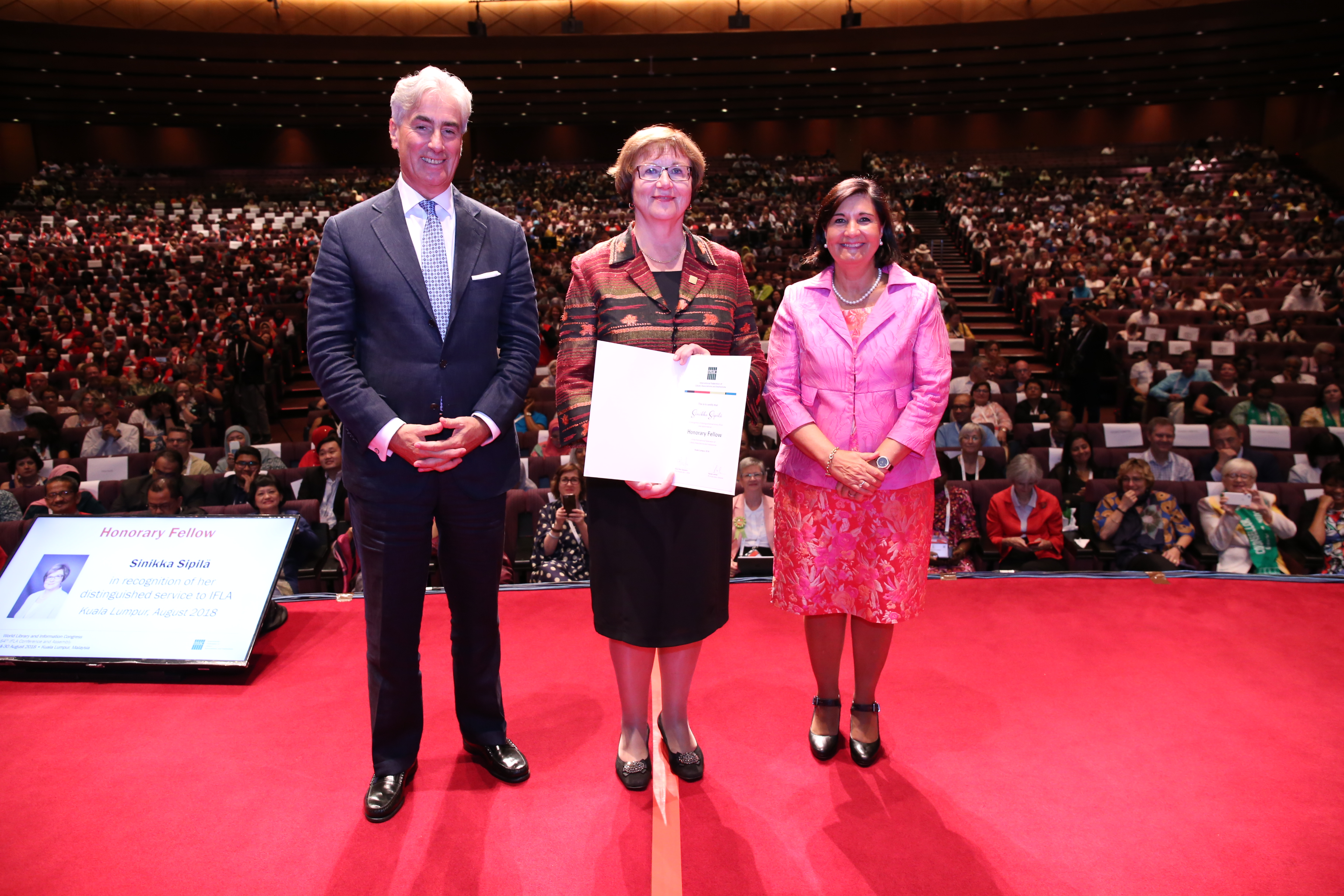
IFLA Honorary Fellow, Sinikka Sipilä (centre) with IFLA Secretary General Gerald Leitner and IFLA President Glòria Pérez-Salmerón at the World Library and Information Conference, Kuala Lumpur, 2018

As president of the International Federation of Library Associations and Institutions Sipilä chose the theme Strong Libraries, Strong Societies to promote equal opportunities and equitable access to life-long learning and education and to promote informed citizens around the world who actively participate in their community and promote sustainable development, intellectual and economic growth as well as general well-being.

During Sipilä's term as IFLA president, the United Nations 2030 Agenda for Sustainable Development Goals started and IFLA joined this initiative. This encouraged all libraries around the world aim to work towards the 17 Goals providing access to the information to their communities. Sipilä represented the library field at events including the International Conference Internet and the socio-cultural transformations in information society. Sipilä was IFLA president when the Lyon Declaration was launched and supported by more than 600 institutions around the world to improve access to information and development, based on the idea that the access to the information is a fundamental pillar to sustainable development.

Her president's meetings were held at Helsinki (2014) and Istanbul (2015) and the topics covered were "Strong Libraries – Strong Societies: Impact of Libraries on Society" for the first one and "The Art of Transforming Libraries" in the second one.

Sipilä completed her term as IFLA president in 2015 at the World Library Information Congress in Cape Town and was succeeded by Donna Scheeder. Sipilä emphasized the role of the libraries in society, especially in Africa, based on active participation, freedom of expression and access to information, mentioned in the Cape Town Declaration. She encouraged library associations and librarians to seek to be heard by politicians and decision-makers, in order not just to show the benefits of the libraries to society, but as key part to help achieve their mandates of fostering community development. Sinikka Sipilä was made an IFLA Honorary Fellow in recognition of her distinguished service to IFLA.
