= Ana Santos Aramburo =

Spanish librarian

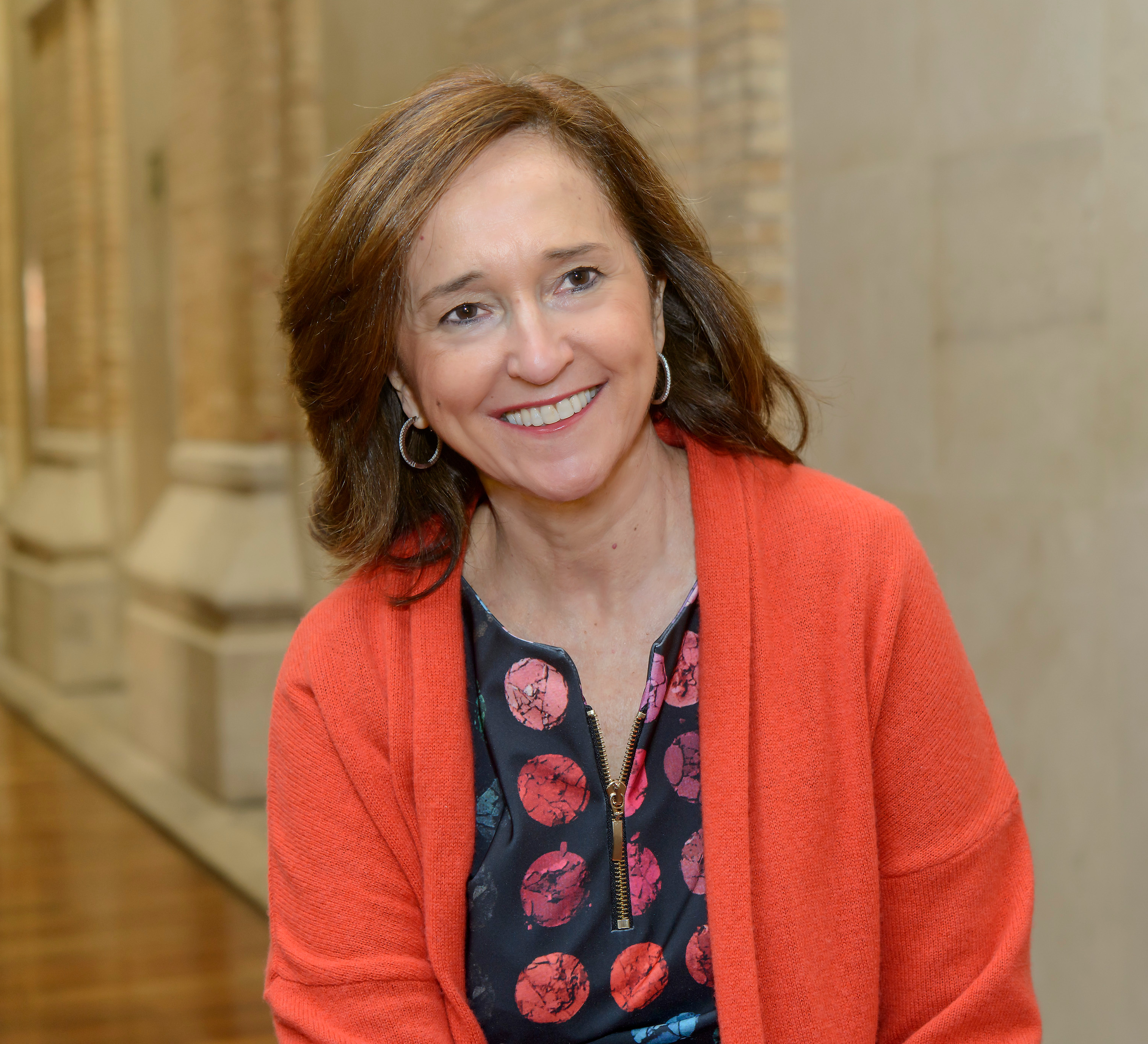
- Santos at the National Library, 2015
- Born: 1957 (age 68–69); Zaragoza, Spain

Academic background
- Education: University of Zaragoza

Academic work
- Discipline: Library science
- Institutions: Complutense University of Madrid; National Library of Spain

Ana Santos Aramburo (born 1957) is a Spanish librarian who has been the director of the National Library of Spain since February 2013.

== Biography ==
Ana Santos Aramburo was born in Zaragoza in 1957. Santos has a degree in geography and history from the University of Zaragoza (designated Distinguished Student of her Faculty of Philosophy and Letters, on 26 April 2012) and Diploma in Library Science and Documentation from the Documentary Studies Center of the Ministry of Culture. Her thesis was “Artistic Documentation in the Archive of Notarial Protocols of Zaragoza in the 17th century”. In 1982, she began working in the Universidad Complutense of Madrid, where she developed a good part of her professional career over 25 years. Between 1987 and 1991, she worked at the library of the Faculty of Economics and Business Sciences, where she served as assistant director. Between 1993 and 2001, she held the deputy director of the Library of the Universidad Complutense, responsible for the implementation of the computerized management program and the incorporation of new services for access to scientific information through the network. Between October 2003 and March 2007, she was the Director of the Historical Library Marquis of Valdecilla, which is the depository of the bibliographic heritage of the Universidad Complutense. She also served as General Director of Libraries and Archives of the City council of Madrid, and Director of Cultural Action of the National Library (2003–2007).

== Director of the National Library of Spain ==
The Ministry of Education, Culture and Sport nominated Santos to succeed Glòria Pérez-Salmerón as the head of the National Library of Spain. After the nomination, Santos was involved in the set up of the digital legal deposit.

In April 2014, she worked on the approval for a resolution that would regulate the granting of ''emeritus librarian'' to those professionals who stood out in their services to the institution. In July 2014, she was involved in regulatory law of the National Library of Spain, which would endow to the library a greater autonomy, as well as a similar status to the Museum del Prado and the National Museum Arts centre Queen Sofia.

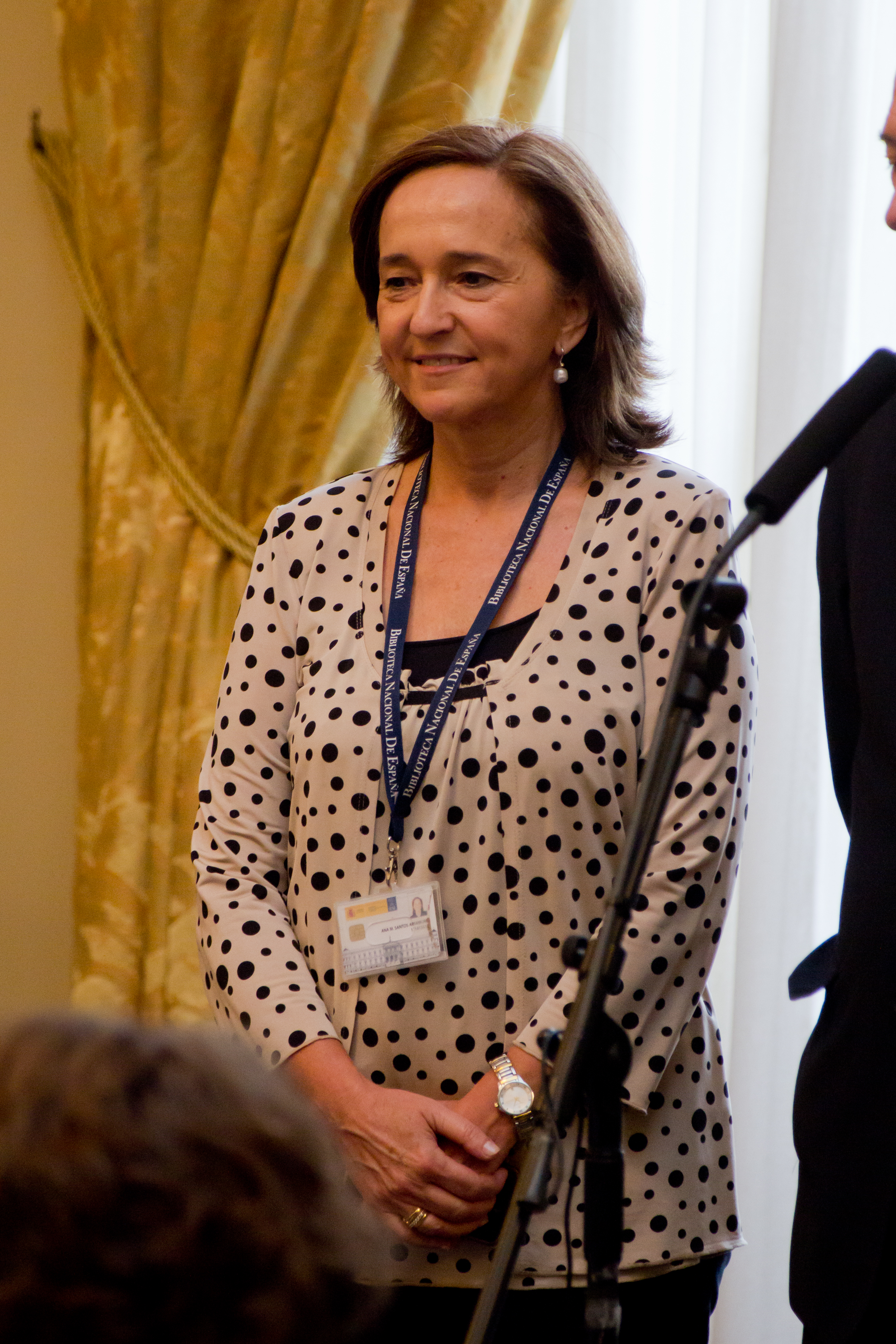
Ana Santos Aramburo during the Wiki Editathon on Spanish language and literature in Madrid, 2014.

== Selected works ==
- «La lectura: mucho más que un negocio». Informe Omniprom: 53–58. 2013.
- «El archivo de la web española». Revista Trama y Texturas (22): 101–110. Diciembre de 2013.
- «Una lectora de libros de caballerías: La Condesa de Campo de Alange». Amadis de Gaula: 500 años de libros de caballerías. Catálogo de la exposición celebrada en la Biblioteca Nacional de España (Madrid: BNE). 2008.
- «La colección de libros de caballerías de la Condesa de Campo de Alange». Pliegos de Bibliofilia: 3–16. 2004.
- «Las procedencias de la Biblioteca Histórica de la Universidad Complutense: una primera aproximación». La Memoria de los libros. Estudios sobre el estudio del escrito y de la lectura en Europa y América (Salamanca: Instituto de Historia del Libro y de la Lectura). 2004.
- «La colección de incunables de la Biblioteca Histórica de la Universidad Complutense». [Ed.facsimilar de la ed. de Segovia, Juan Parix, 1472]. Andrés Escobar: Modus Confitendi (Segovia). 2004.
- «La Biblioteca Histórica de la Universidad Complutense». CLIP (40). 2003.
- «El bachiller de Borja Pedro de Moncayo y las distintas ediciones de su "Flor de varios romances"». Cuadernos de Estudios Borjanos (CSIC, Institución Fernando el Católico (en prensa)).
- El padre Florez y la Biblioteca Histórica de la Universidad Complutense. Madrid: Biblioteca Histórica. 2003.
- Sermones y oraciones fúnebres dedicadas al Cardenal Cisneros en la Biblioteca Histórica de la Universidad Complutense. Madrid: Biblioteca Histórica. 2003.
- «Sor Mariana Sallent, poetisa clarisa del siglo XVII». Cuadernos de Estudios Borjanos (CSIC, Institución Fernando el Católico). Tercer trimestre de 2002.
- «Los servicios bibliotecarios: tradición y modernidad». Actas XII Jornadas de la Asociación Andaluza de Bibliotecarios (Sevilla). 2000.
- «El impacto de las nuevas tecnologías en la Biblioteca Universitaria. II Jornadas de gestión administrativa de la UCM. Ponencias y conclusiones del área de Biblioteca». Documentos de Trabajo de la Biblioteca de la Universidad Complutense, 94/4.
- «Conversión retrospectiva: Métodos y propuestas de viabilidad». Tratado básico de Biblioteconomía (Editorial Complutense). 1995.
- «Internet y las Bibliotecas Universitarias». Actas de II Congreso de la Asociación de usuarios de INTERNET (Madrid). 1997.
- «Los servicios de proceso técnico ante el almacenamiento masivo de registros en redes de área local». Congreso sobre el CD-ROM en red (Universidad de Cádiz). 1995.
