= Jesus Lau =

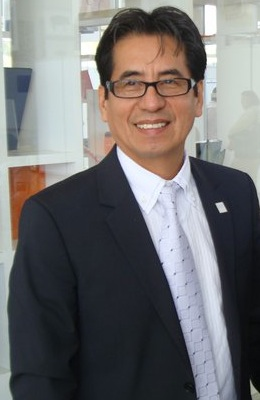
- Born: 12 December; Los Mochis, Sinaloa, Mexico
- Education: University of Sheffield, University of Denver, Universidad Autónoma de Sinaloa
- Known for: Research and practice on information literacy
- Scientific career
- Fields: Information science, library and information science
- Workplaces: Universidad Veracruzana, International Federation of Library Associations and Institutions, American Library Association, Mexican Library Association, Border Regional Library Association, Special Libraries Association
- Doctoral advisor: Thomas D. Wilson
- Website: jesuslau.com.mx

Jesus Lau is a Mexican librarian, and a contributor to the fields of information science and library and information science since 1977; his research focuses on information literacy and the development of information competencies. He is a member of several organizations related to the library field, such as the American Library Association, the Mexican Library Association, the Border Regional Library Association, the International Federation of Library Associations and Institutions (IFLA), and the Special Libraries Association. He has facilitated nearly 150 courses, including workshops and seminars on library and information science, with special emphasis on information literacy and management and leadership at several institutions in Botswana, Brazil, Colombia, Estonia, Guatemala, Mexico, Peru, USA, Venezuela, among others.

== Early life and education ==
He received his BA (1974) in Law from Universidad Autónoma de Sinaloa, his MA (1977) in Library Science from University of Denver, and his Ph.D. (1988) in Information Studies from University of Sheffield, England.

== Career ==
In México, he has been a member of the Mexican Library Association since 1974 and was its president for the period 2009 to 2011. Moreover, he has received the award of Librarian of the Year for 2011, granted by the Guadalajara International Book Fair, the second largest in the second hemisphere. He was among a group of Latin American professionals that attended the 61st International Federation of Library Associations and Institutions (IFLA) World Conference in Istanbul, where they had a glance into the area of information literacy and this moment was arguably instrumental for the arrival of information literacy in Latin America, which started quickly with the development of various initiatives in educational institutions, mainly universities. He was elected as Director of the Special Libraries Association for the period 2002-2005. Among his most relevant international contributions to the research area of information literacy, he has edited several books on information literacy published by IFLA and often funded by UNESCO, including Information literacy: international perspectives, Information literacy: An international state-of-the art report, Guidelines on information literacy for lifelong learning and Towards information literacy indicators: conceptual framework paper. His research in the field of information literacy in both libraries and academic institutions has been normative, with the Guidelines, as well as involving and understanding the connections between theory and practice. Lau has represented Mexico with the IFLA. In June 2009 IFLA announced that Ingrid Parent was chosen as President-elect for the term 2009-2011 and President for the term 2011-2012, for taking 895 votes. Lau received 844.

== Honors, awards and positions ==
Lau has received various awards and honors, among them is the John Cotton Dana Award, which he received on 15 July at the SLA’s 2012 Annual Conference & INFO-EXPO in Chicago, thus making him the first Latin American researcher to receive this award. Also worthy of mention are the following honors: Recognition for Uninterrupted Support for the Conference since 1990, granted by the Transborder Library Forum, US-Mexico in 2005; in 2003 he was selected for inclusion in the Mexican Librarians Biography Repertory for an outstanding career; and the National System of Researchers Award (Mexico), awarded for "eight consecutive three-year terms, starting in 1989". In his native region, he has received the recognition 'Sinaloenses Ejemplares' (Exemplary people from Sinaloa) in the category of research and development.

== Selected writings ==
- Machin-Mastromatteo, Juan D.; Lau, Jesus (2015). "The arrival of information literacy". Information Development. 31 (2): 190–193. doi:10.1177/0266666915569147. ISSN 0266-6669. S2CID 62558756.
- Machin-Mastromatteo, Juan D.; Lau, Jesus; Virkus, Sirje (2013). "Participatory Action Research and Information Literacy: Revising an Old New Hope for Research and Practice". Worldwide Commonalities and Challenges in Information Literacy Research and Practice (PDF). Communications in Computer and Information Science. Vol. 397. pp. 48–53. doi:10.1007/978-3-319-03919-0_5. ISBN 978-3-319-03918-3. ISSN 1865-0929.
- Mexico: Libraries, Archives and Museums (2009) in the Encyclopedia of Library and Information Sciences, Third Edition
- Towards information literacy indicators: conceptual framework paper with Ralph Catts (2008)
- Information literacy: international perspectives with IFLA (2008)
- Information literacy: An international state-of-the art report with IFLA (2007)
- Guidelines on information literacy for lifelong learning with IFLA (2006)
- Normas de alfabetización informativa para el aprendizaje with Jesus Cortés (2004)
- Construyendo puentes informativos: experiencias de cooperación entre México y EUA with Jesús Cortés (1998)
- Technical dictionary of library and information science: English-Spanish, Spanish-English with Marta S Ayala and Reynaldo Ayala (1993)
- A study of selected social factors influencing information development in low, middle and highly developed countries: an assessment for the period 1960-1977 (1988)
- The effects of Mexico's developing economy on libraries and their users (1977)
