= Biblioteca Nacional de España =

Public library in Madrid, Spain

National Library of Spain
- Biblioteca Nacional de España

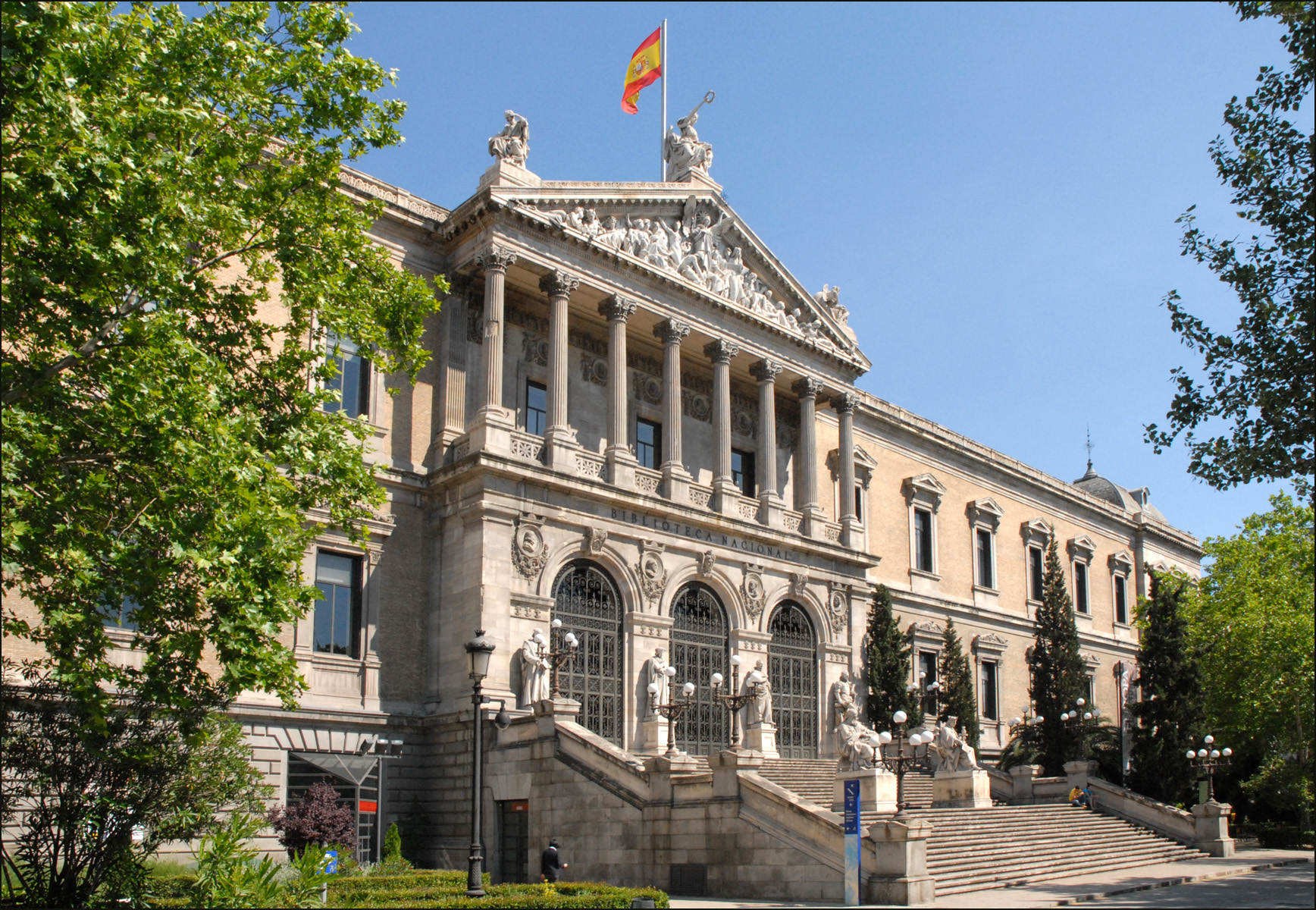
- Location: Madrid, Spain
- Established: 1711 (315 years ago)
- Reference to legal mandate: Royal Decree 1581/1991 on 31 October

Collection
- Items collected: books, journals, newspapers, magazines, sound and music recordings, patents, databases, maps, stamps, prints, drawings and manuscripts
- Size: 26,000,000 items, including 15,000,000 books and other printed materials, 30,000 manuscripts, 143,000 newspapers and serials, 4,500,000 graphic materials, 510,000 music scores, etc.
- Legal deposit: Yes, by Decree on 23 December 1957

Access and use
- Access requirements: Access to reproductions and post-1958 materials is open to Biblioteca Nacional library card holders. Access to pre-1958 materials is only allowed with a researcher card. Materials in exceptional circumstances are subject to special restrictions.
- Members: 115,707 readers in 2007. The web users in the same year were 1,800,935.

Other information
- Budget: €47,380,860
- Director: Ana Santos Aramburo (since 2013)
- Employees: 1025 (including external employees)
- Website: www.bne.es

Spanish Cultural Heritage
- Official name: Biblioteca Nacional de España
- Type: Non-movable
- Criteria: Monument
- Designated: 1983
- Reference no.: RI-51-0004908

The Biblioteca Nacional de España (National Library of Spain) is the national library of Spain. It is the largest public library in the country, and one of the largest in the world. Founded in 1711, it is an autonomous agency attached to the Ministry of Culture since 1990. Its headquarters is located on the Paseo de Recoletos in Madrid, sharing the building with the National Archaeological Museum.

== History ==
The library was founded by King Philip V in 1711 as the Royal Library or Palace Public Library. The Royal Letters Patent that he granted, the predecessor of the current legal deposit requirement, made it mandatory for printers to submit a copy of every book printed in Spain to the library. In 1836, the Crown transferred the library to the Ministry of Governance and it was renamed as National Library. A year later, women were allowed access to the library for the first time, after a petition from writer Antonia Gutiérrez was granted by Queen Regent Maria Christina.

During the 19th century, confiscations, purchases and donations enabled the National Library to acquire the majority of the antique and valuable books that it currently holds. In 1892, the building was used to host the Historical American Exposition. On 16 March 1896, the National Library opened to the public in the same building in which it is currently housed and included a vast Reading Room on the main floor designed to hold 320 readers. In 1931, the Reading Room was reorganised, providing it with a major collection of reference works, and the General Reading Room was created to cater for students, workers and general readers.

During the Spanish Civil War close to 500,000 volumes were collected by a Confiscation Committee and stored in the National Library to safeguard works of art and books held until then in religious establishments, palaces and private houses. During the 20th century numerous modifications were made to the building to adapt its rooms and repositories to its constantly expanding collections, to the growing volume of material received following the modification to the Legal Deposit requirement in 1958, and to the numerous works purchased by the library. Among this building work, some of the most noteworthy changes were the alterations made in 1955 to triple the capacity of the library's repositories, and those started in 1986 and completed in 2000, which led to the creation of the new building in Alcalá de Henares and complete remodelling of the building on Paseo de Recoletos, Madrid.

In 1986, when Spain's main bibliographic institutions – the National Newspaper Library (Hemeroteca Nacional), the Hispanic Bibliographic Institute (Instituto Bibliográfico Hispánico) and the Centre for Documentary and Bibliographic Treasures (Centro del Tesoro Documental y Bibliográfico) – were incorporated into the National Library, the library was established as the State Repository of Spain's Cultural Memory (Centro Estatal Depositario de la Memoria Cultural Española), making all of Spain's bibliographic output on any media available to the Spanish Library System and national and international researchers and cultural and educational institutions. In 1990 it was made an autonomous agency attached to the Ministry of Culture.

The Madrid headquarters are shared with the National Archaeological Museum.

== The library today ==
The National Library is Spain's highest library institution and is head of the Spanish Library System.

As the country's national library, it is the centre responsible for identifying, preserving, conserving, and disseminating information about Spain's documentary heritage, and it aspires to be an essential point of reference for research into Spanish culture. In accordance with its Articles of Association, passed by Royal Decree 1581/1991 (R.D. 1581/1991) of 31 October 1991, its principal functions are to:

- Compile, catalogue, and conserve bibliographic archives produced in any language of the Spanish state, or any other language, for the purposes of research, culture, and information.
- Promote research through the study, loan, and reproduction of its bibliographic archive.
- Disseminate information on Spain's bibliographic output based on the entries received through the legal deposit requirement.

The library's collection consists of more than 26,000,000 items, including 15,000,000 books and other printed materials, 4,500,000 graphic materials, 600,000 sound recordings, 510,000 music scores, more than 500,000 microforms, 500,000 maps, 143,000 newspapers and serials, 90,000 audiovisuals, 90,000 electronic documents, and 30,000 manuscripts.

The current director of the National Library is Ana Santos Aramburo, appointed in 2013. Former directors include her predecessors Glòria Pérez-Salmerón (2010–2013) and Milagros del Corral (2007–2010) as well as historian Juan Pablo Fusi (1996–2000) and author Rosa Regàs (2004–2007).

Given its role as the legal deposit for the whole of Spain, since 1991 it has kept most of the overflowing collection at a secondary site in Alcalá de Henares, near Madrid.

The National Library provides access to its collections through the following library services:

- Guidance and general information on the institution and other libraries.
- Bibliographic information about its collection and those held by other libraries or library systems.
- Access to its automated catalogue, which currently contains close to 3,000,000 bibliographic records encompassing all of its collections.
- Archive consultation in the library's reading rooms.
- Interlibrary loans.
- Archive reproduction.
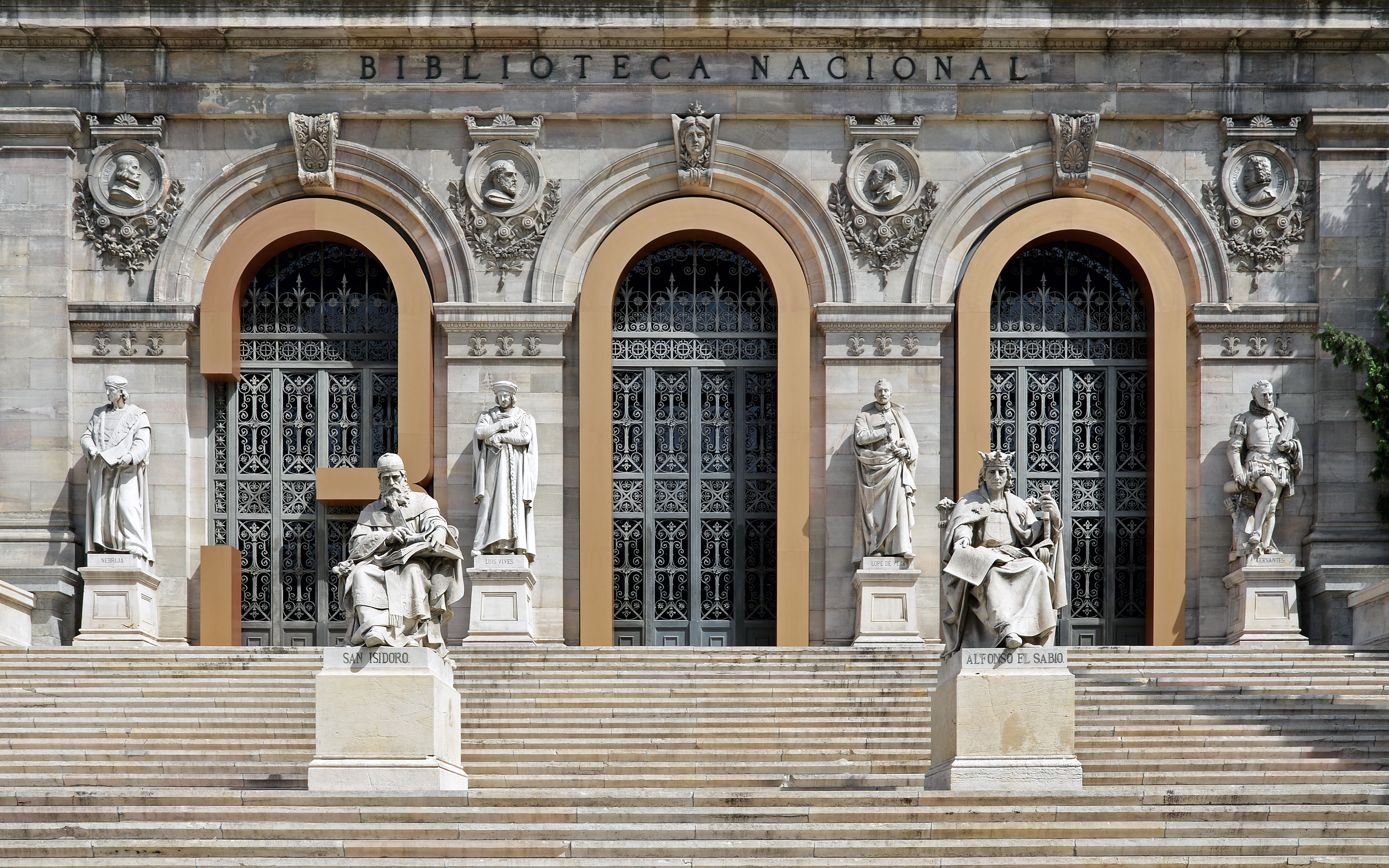
Stairs and main entrance with monuments to San Isidoro, Alonso Berruguete, Alfonso X el Sabio by José Alcoverro

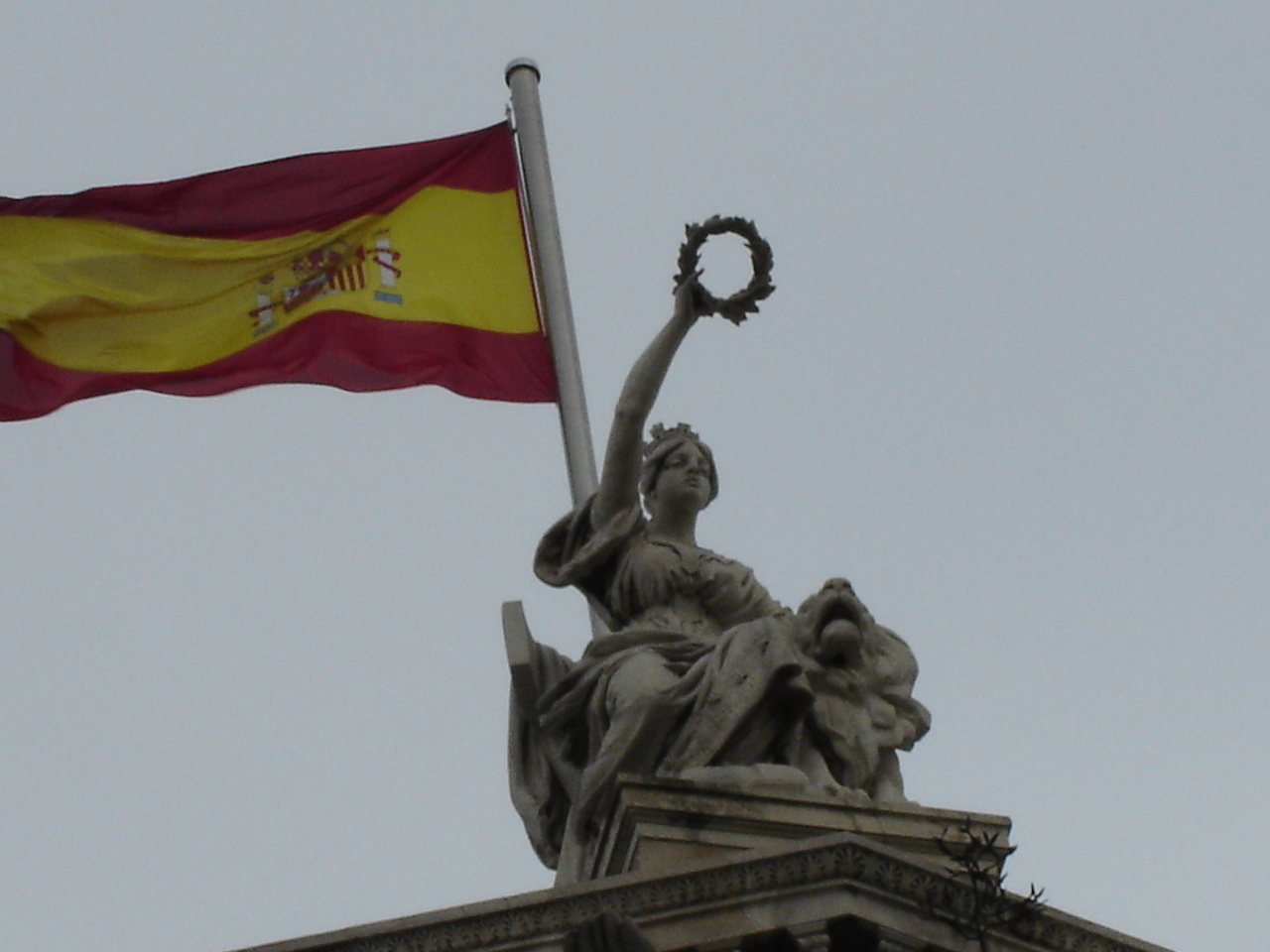
Statue of Hispania by Agustí Querol above the library

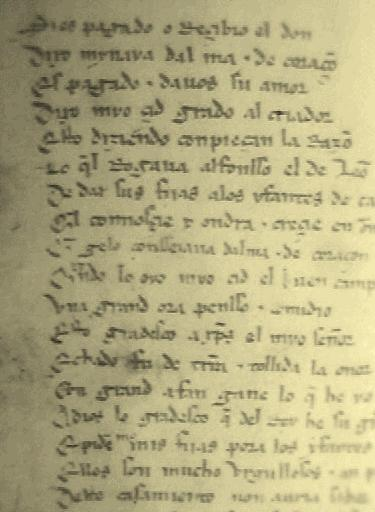
A page from the manuscript of The Lay of the Cid

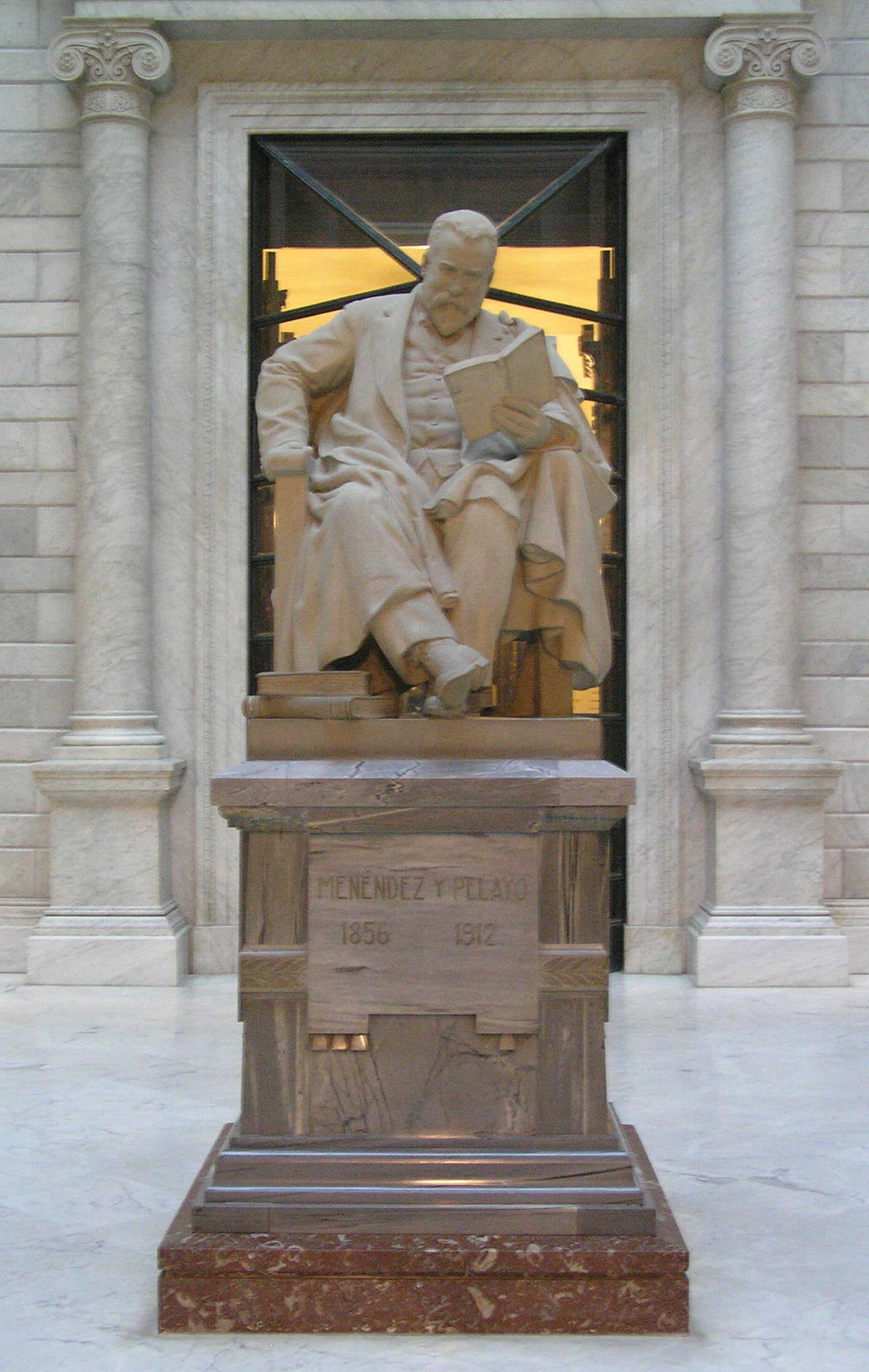
Statue of Marcelino Menéndez y Pelayo in the lobby of the B.N.E.

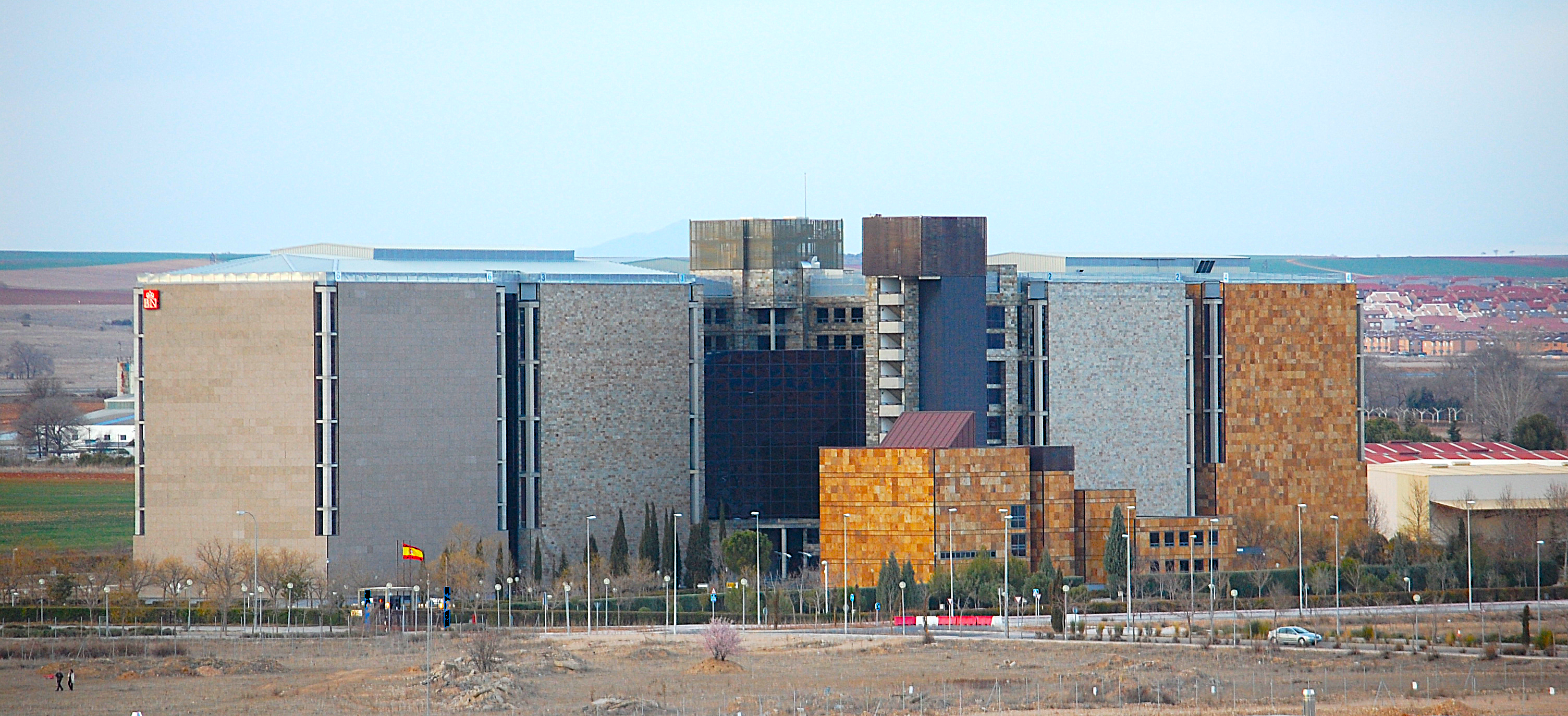
Building of the National Library of Spain in Alcalá de Henares

== See also ==
- Biblioteca Digital Hispánica, digital library launched in 2008 by the Biblioteca Nacional de España
- List of libraries in Spain
