= Ingrid Parent =

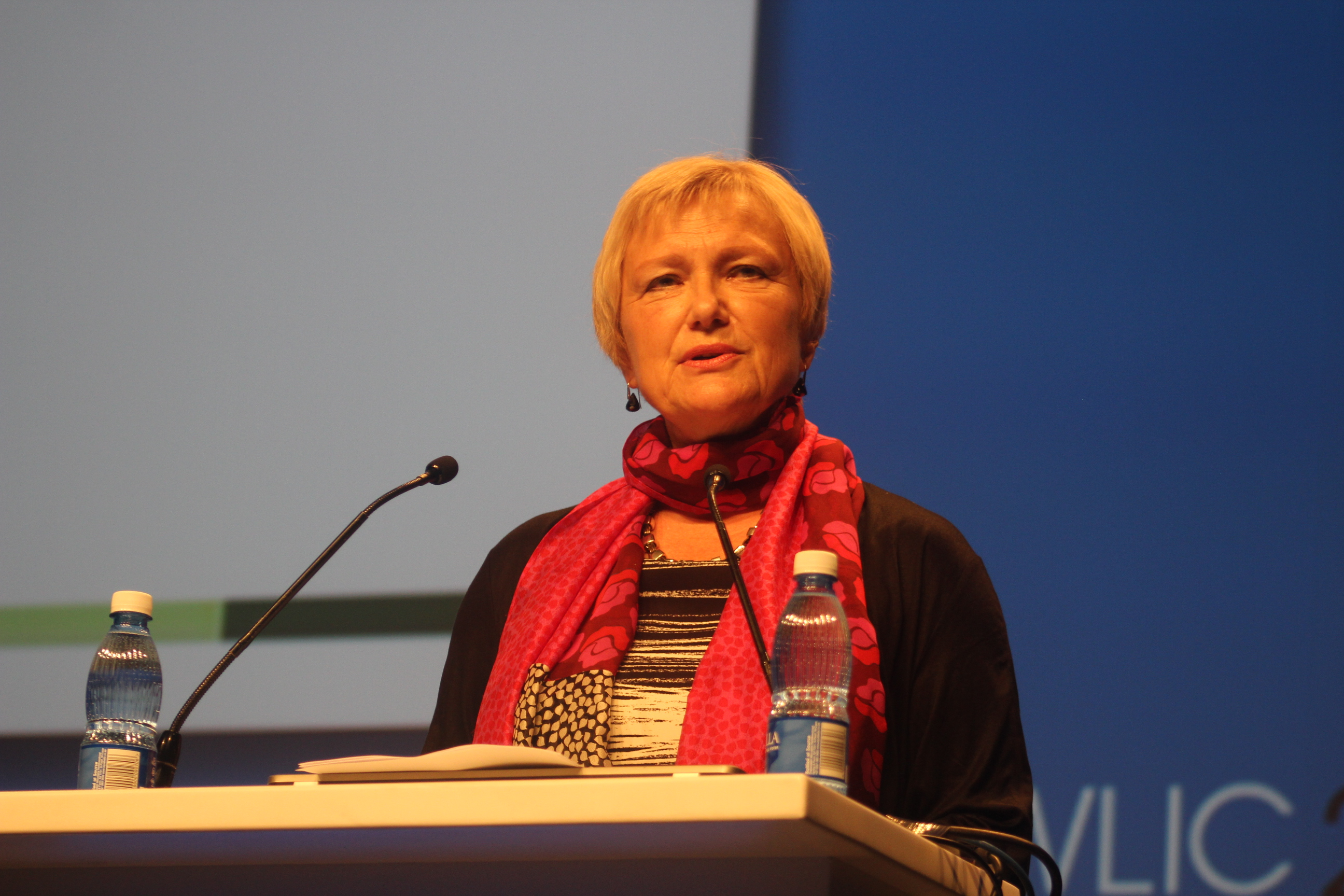
- Parent in 2015

President of the International Federation of Library Associations
- Incumbent
- Assumed office 2011
- Succeeded by: Sinikka Sipilä

Personal details
- Born: Canada
- Occupation: Librarian

Ingrid Parent is a Canadian-based librarian who was President of the International Federation of Library Associations

== Life ==
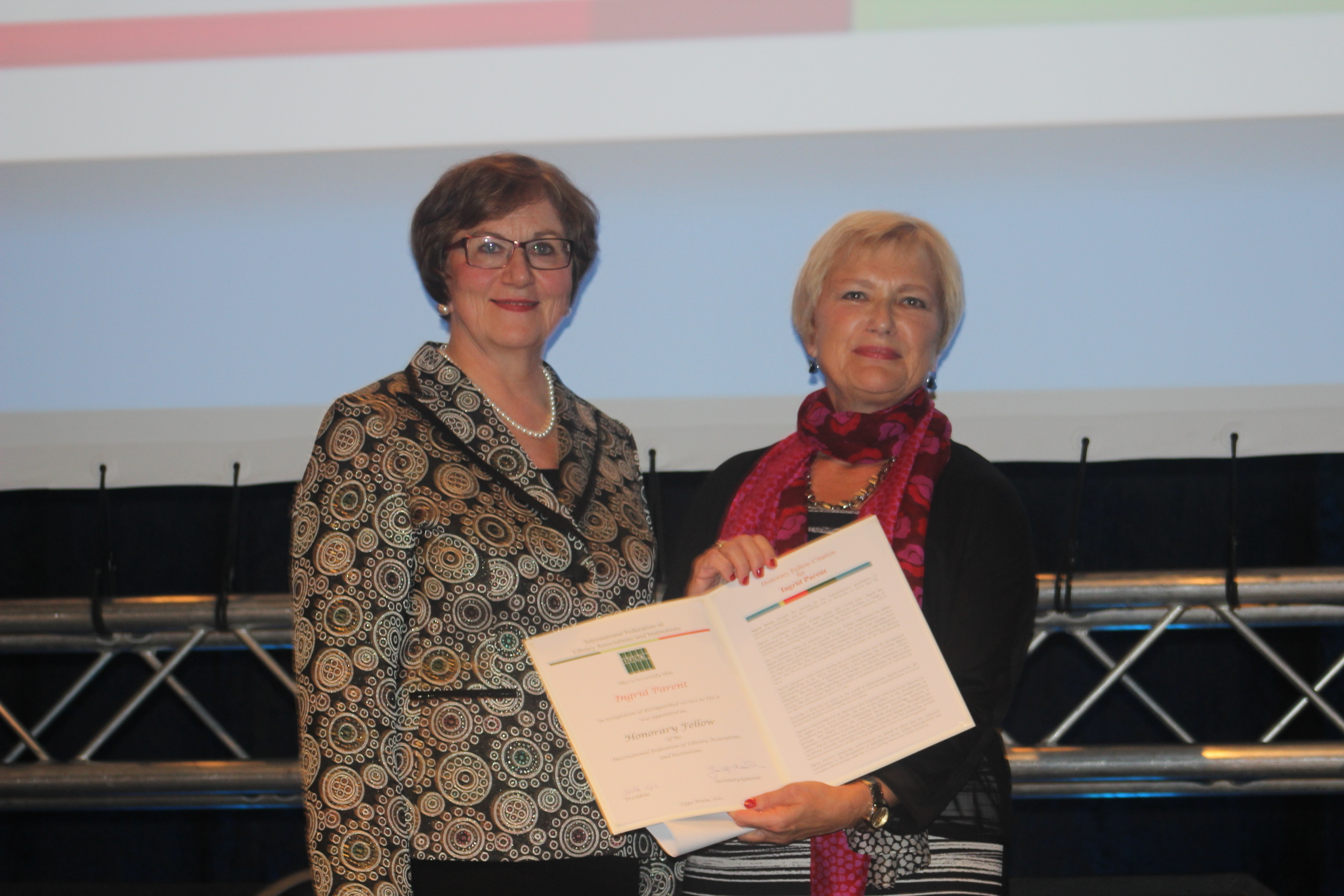
IFLA Presidents Sinikka Sipilä & Ingrid Parent in 2015

Parent was the University Librarian at the University of British Columbia from July 1, 2009 to June 30, 2016. From 1994 to 2004, she was Director General of Acquisitions and Bibliographic Services at the former National Library of Canada, then became Assistant Deputy Minister for Documentary Heritage, Library and Archives Canada, responsible for the development, description and preservation of Canada's documentary heritage, from 2004 to 2009.

Parent has represented Canada with the International Federation of Library Associations. In June 2009, IFLA announced that Ms Parent was chosen as President-elect for the term 2009-2011 and President for the term 2011–2012, taking 895 votes to 844 votes for the Mexican candidate Jesus Lau.

She is the second UBC University Librarian to have had a career at the national level after William Kaye Lamb.
