= Antonia Gutiérrez =

Spanish writer and translator

- Born: Antonia Gutiérrez Bueno y Ahoiz; 17 January 1781; Madrid, Spain
- Died: 6 April 1874 (aged 93); Madrid, Spain
- Burial place: Cementerio de San Justo
- Occupation(s): Writer, translator
- Spouse: Antonio Arnau
- Parents: Pedro Gutiérrez Bueno (father); Mariana Ahoiz y Navarro (mother)

Antonia Gutiérrez Bueno y Ahoiz (penname Eugenio Ortazán y Brunet; 1781–1874) was a Spanish writer and translator. In 1837, she became the first woman to be granted access to the National Library of Spain.

== Biography ==
Antonia Gutiérrez was born on Calle Ancha de San Bernardo in Madrid on 17 January 1781, into a wealthy and educated family. She was the daughter of Mariana Ahoiz y Navarro and Pedro Gutiérrez Bueno, the king's chief apothecary. Her father not only interacted with intellectuals of the time, such as Leandro Fernández de Moratín, but also had an extraordinary library of more than 300 works on scientific topics, dictionaries, and grammar of other languages – books to which the daughters of the family had free access.

She married Antonio Arnau, with whom she lived in Paris, where she continued to move in intellectual circles. Like other writers of her time, she adopted a penname, Eugenio Ortazán y Brunet, when publishing her translation of a collection of French articles on morbid cholera. Under that name she also produced the first volume of a Historical and Biographical Dictionary of Famous Women in 1835.

After the death of her husband, Gutiérrez returned to Madrid to continue work on the second volume of her dictionary. On 12 January 1837, she wrote a letter requesting access to the National Library of Spain for her research.

The director of the National Library, Joaquín María Patiño, transmitted her request to the Ministry of Governance, indicating that "the constitutions of this establishment prohibit the entry of women and also the removal of books from the house." He offered the applicant a room on the ground floor, but noted that since it was small, "if there were more than five or six women who wanted to take advantage of this benefit...it would be necessary to buy tables, a brazier, desks, and everything necessary so that the ladies could be present with the corresponding decency." In another report, a royal advisor described the old prohibition of 1761 as a barbaric precept, and pointed out that "this half of the people in Spain still have convents where they can lock themselves up and not libraries where they can learn."

The queen regent, María Cristina de Borbón, resolved to "allow entry into the lower room women who desire to meet at the Library... not only Doña Antonia Gutiérrez, but... all the other women who wish to attend," adding that, "in the fortunate event that the number of these exceeds five or six, you should accommodate them, stating the increase in expenditure that is essential."

Antonia Gutiérrez never completed her dictionary, but she did later publish various articles, one of them in defense of female education.

She died in Madrid on 6 April 1874, and was interred at the Cementerio de San Justo.

== Selected works ==
- Recopilación de lo mas interesante que se ha publicado en Abril de 1832 en la Gaceta de Francia [Compilation of the Most Interesting Articles That Have Been Published in April 1832 in the Gazette of France] (in Spanish). Madrid: Imprenta de Pedro Ximenez de Haro. July 1832 – via Google Books.
- Diccionario histórico y biográfico de mugeres célebres [Historical and Biographical Dictionary of Famous Women] (in Spanish). Vol. I. 1835.
