= Milagros del Corral =

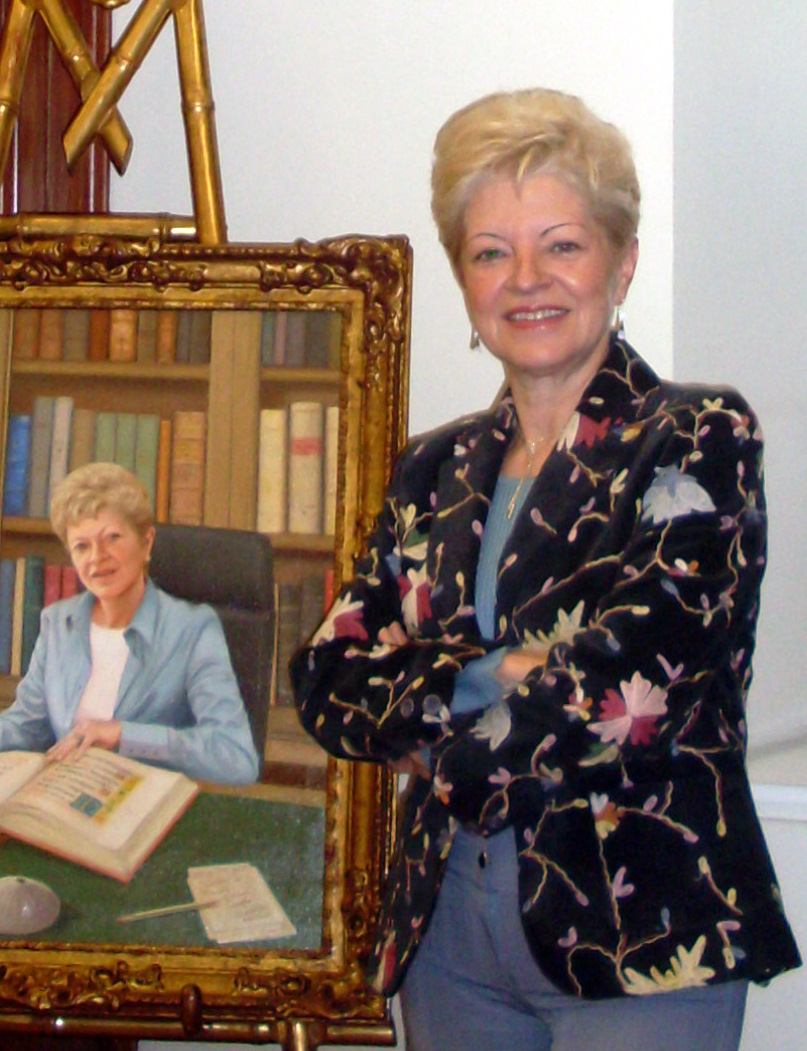
Milagros del Corral

Milagros del Corral Beltrán (born 1945, Madrid) is a Spanish librarian. She was Director-General of the Biblioteca Nacional de España (National Library of Spain).

In addition to her position as Director-General of the National Library of Spain (September 2007-April 2010), she has served as the State Librarian (Spain), Secretary General of the Spanish Federation of Publishers (1983-1990), and Deputy Assistant Director-General for Culture at UNESCO Headquarters in Paris (1990-2005).

== Awards ==
- Awarded in 1980 by HM King Juan Carlos I of Spain as a Commander of the Order of Civil Merit (first woman in that range of the Order).
- Honorary Member of the American Institute of Copyright, the Committee Hyoge-Kobe Japan, from Aid to Artisans United States .
- Nationality Colombian honorable
- Honorary Citizen of Popayan, Colombia
- ARDE 2010 Award for best digital leadership (2010) (Spain)
