= Donna Scheeder =

American librarian (1947–2022)

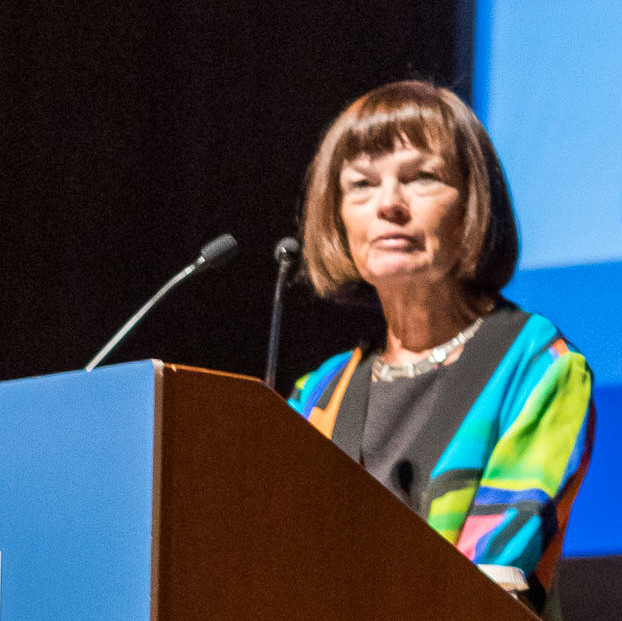
- Born: Donna Wills Scheeder; November 8, 1947; Buffalo, New York, U.S.
- Died: March 7, 2022 (aged 74); Capitol Hill, Washington, D.C., U.S.
- Education: Georgetown University
- Occupation: Librarian
- Organisation: International Federation of Library Associations and Institutions (IFLA)

Donna Wills Scheeder (November 8, 1947 – March 7, 2022) was an American librarian who was president of the International Federation of Library Associations and Institutions (IFLA) from 2015 to 2017, under the theme "Libraries: A Call to Action". Scheeder participated in the IFLA Governing Board for 6 years.

== Career ==
Scheeder was deputy director of Information in the Research Service of the Library of Congress of the US, Director of Services in the Library of Law of Congress and participated in the Permanent Commission of Library and Research Services for Parliaments. She was a member of the Library of Congress Advisory Council.

She was President of the Special Libraries Association (SLA) from 2000 to 2001.

Donna Scheeder was president of the International Federation of Library Associations. During her tenure, she visited the Russian State Library on the initiative of the Margarita Rudomino State Library of Foreign Literature. She spoke frequently about the contributions made by libraries to advance the achievement of the UN 2030 agenda and the Sustainable Development Goals.

Scheeder retired in March 2015 as deputy chief information officer for the Congressional Research Service after a long career at the US Library of Congress, which included 5 years as Director of Legal Library Services. She was past president of the IFLA Section of Libraries and Research Services for Parliaments and trained parliamentary librarians in many countries around the world.

Scheeder was an early advocate of integrating computers into libraries and introduced a number of new services throughout her career, including establishing the first collection of legal blogs and instituting the Electronic Briefing Book product for Congress. She was on the organizing committees of the Computers in Libraries and Internet Librarian conferences.

== Personal life ==
Scheeder lived on Capitol Hill in Washington DC. She was a founding member of the Hill Center Board of Directors and also served as Chair of the Eastern Market Community Advisory Committee.

Scheeder died from cancer at home on March 7, 2022, at the age of 74.

== Awards and distinctions ==
In 2004, Scheeder received the John Cotton Dana Award in recognition of her services to librarianship.

In 2009, Scheeder received the Federal Librarians Achievement Award. In the same year she was awarded the Community Achievement Award in large part due to this service.

In 2019, Scheeder was made an Honorary Member of the IFLA for her achievements, dedication and service to IFLA, particularly in the areas of organizational transformation of IFLA and in the defense of libraries within the United Nations Sustainable Development Goals.

Scheeder was inducted into the Association of School Libraries Hall of Fame for her work in the field of library science and for her experience and leadership. She was inducted into the Hall of Fame of the Special Libraries Association for her work in library science and her contributions to that association.
