= Gloria Pérez-Salmerón =

Spanish librarian (born 1958)

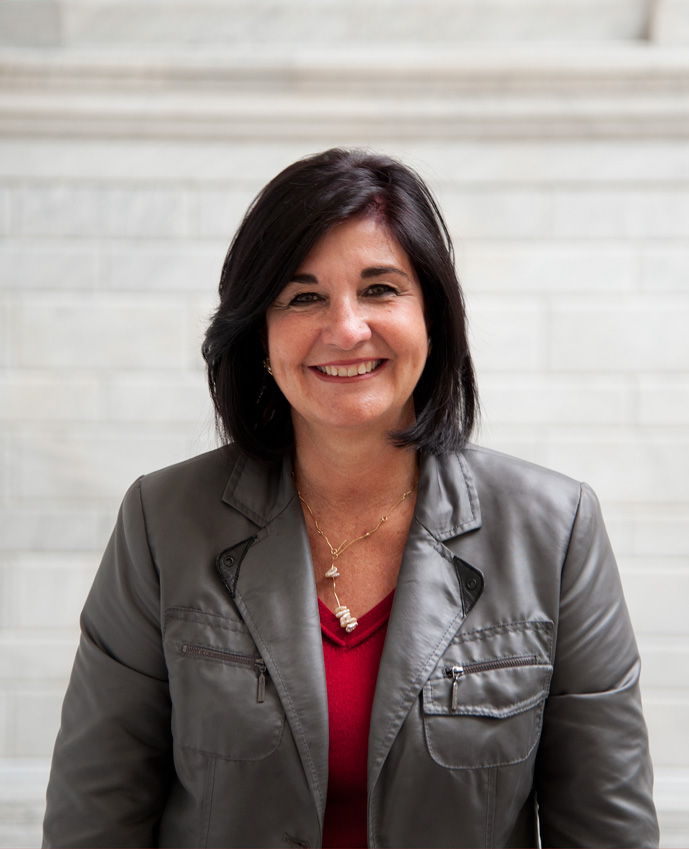
- Born: 1958; Barcelona
- Alma mater: University of Barcelona
- Occupation: Librarian
- Employer: Provincial Deputation of Barcelona
- Awards: Gold Medal of Merit in the Fine Arts (2024)
- Position held: IFLA President (2017–2019), Spain National Library general manager (2010–2013)

Glòria Pérez-Salmerón (born 5 April 1958, Barcelona) is the Stichting IFLA Global Libraries Chair from August 30, 2019 and was Director of the National Library of Spain (BNE). She was President of the Spanish Federation of Societies of Archivists, Librarians, Documentalists and Museology (FESABID) from 2014 to 2018 and from 2017 to 2019 President of the International Federation of Library Associations and Institutions (IFLA).

== Biography ==
Glòria Pérez-Salmerón was born in Barcelona in 1958. She graduated in Documentation at Escola Universitaria Jordi Rubió i Balaguer in Barcelona and has a postgraduate diploma in Librarianship from the Barcelona University Faculty of Librarianship and Information Sciences. She received a postgraduate degree in "Library Management" from the Pompeu Fabra University in Barcelona; as well as in “Government and Public Management in the Information Society: Electronic Government”, from the Pompeu Fabra University and the Escola d’Administració Pública de Catalunya.

Between 1992 and 2001, Pérez-Salmerón served as the first director of the Casacuberta Central Urban Library of Badalona, coordinator of the libraries in the north of the Barcelonés municipality and delegate at the UNET (UNESCO Model Library Network).

Between 2001 and 2005, she was appointed Technical Director of the Network of Municipal Libraries of the Diputació de Barcelona. In 2005 she became Head of Library Cooperation Service of the Department of Culture and Media at the Generalitat de Catalunya, from which she coordinated the Library System of Catalonia.

In 2008, she was elected President of the Spanish Federation of Societies of Archivist, Librarians, Documentalists and Museology (FESABID), a position she held until September 2010, whilst she was Head of the Office of Assistance in Electronic Administration at the Diputació de Barcelona in which she managed, amongst other duties, the municipal register of 268 municipalities of the province of Barcelona, “the adaptation to the LOPD (Data Protection Act), the technological development of the OACs (Citizen’s Attention Offices) and the design and maintenance of the municipal websites if the province of Barcelona.

Glòria Pérez-Salmerón is also Vice President of the European Bureau of Library, Information and Documentation Associations (EBLIDA) and member of the Management Committee of The European Library (TEL). In July 2010 she was elected Director of the National Library of Spain, a proposal made by the then Minister of Culture Ángeles González-Sinde, after consulting the Board of Trustees of the National Library. Ángeles González-Sinde emphasised her experience in digitalisation projects and stated that she was the perfect person to see the Library “through the transition from analogue to digital”.

As Director of the BNE, she elaborated and directed the activities to commemorate the institution’s tricentenary from the end of 2011 to the end of 2012, centred mainly on bringing citizens closer to the BNE. During her time as director she also established the drafting of the 29th of July 23/2011 law, the legal deposit and studied and initiated the drafting of the Royal Decree of Legal Digital Deposits as well as creating the National Repository which holds these.

She also began a Strategic Plan for the 2012-2014 triennial, based on a programme with four main values: quality, austerity, coherence and permanent vocation.

Under Pérez-Salmerón's management, the BNE developed a project of systematic digitalization of holdings, thanks to a partnership agreement with Telefónica – it foresaw the digitalization of 200,000 book titles between 2008 and 2012. In those two years, the Iberian American Digital Library (BDPI) project also flourished and became a reality in October 2012, during the Association of National Libraries’ (ABINIA) General Assembly, with the creation of an access portal to the collections of the American digital libraries.

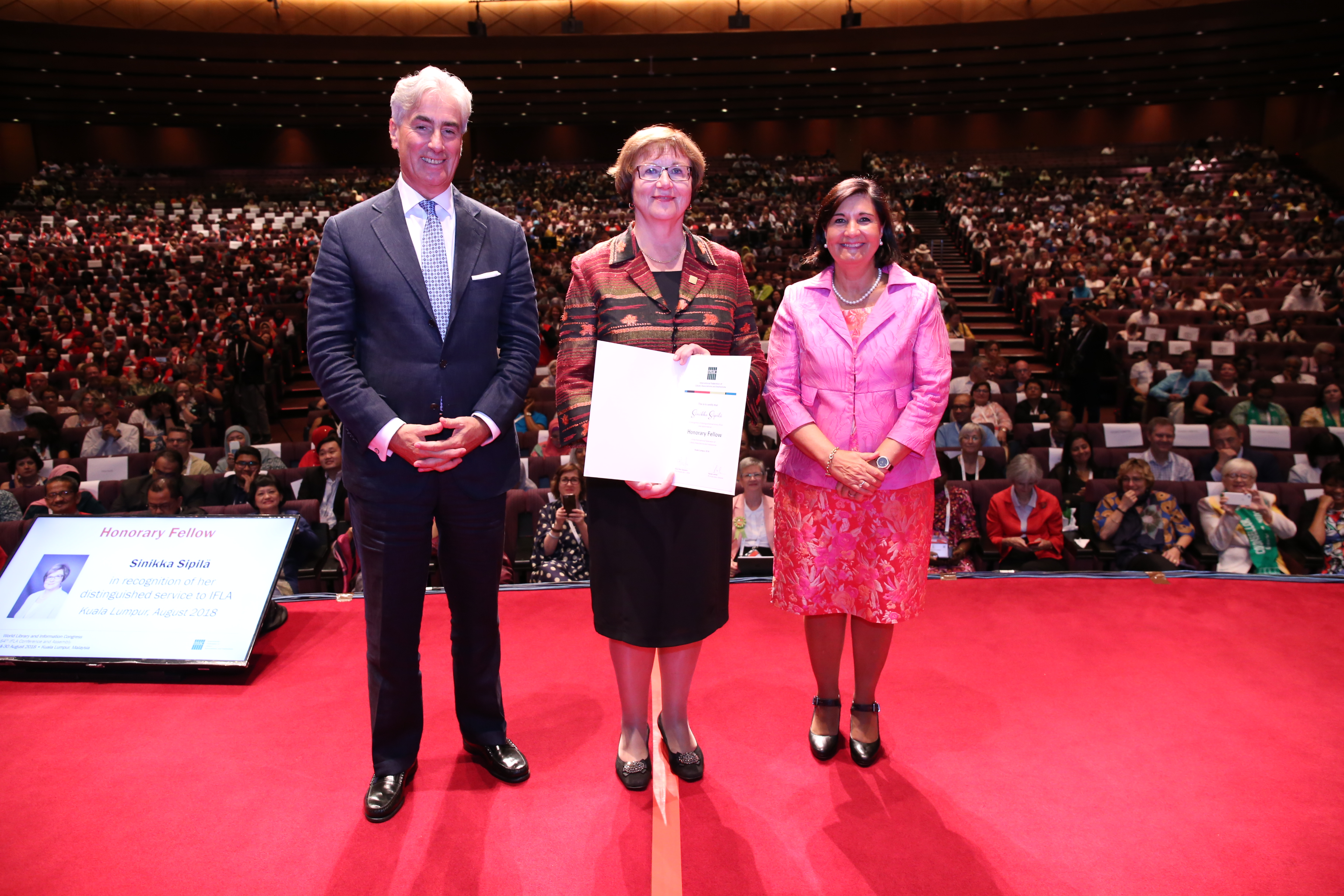
IFLA Secretary General Gerald Leitner and IFLA President Glòria Pérez-Salmerón making award to Honorary fellow Sinikka Sipilä in 2018

At the end of 2011, the BNE incorporated the World Digital Library, contributing with some of the most important works of its collections. She launched the BNE 2.0 intranet as a horizontal communication tool and the library’s Museum activities, and improved the BNE’s presence on the Internet via its website and social media.

Together with her team, she worked to achieve the library’s own statute, which facilitated its self-management and leadership abilities at a global level.

In January 2012, the new government ratified Glòria Pérez-Salmerón in her role as Director of the National Library of Spain. On 18 February 2013, she was dismissed as Director of the National Library of Spain.

She was the President of the International Federation of Library Associations and Institutions (IFLA) in 2018 and has been President of the Spanish Federation of Societies of Archivist, Librarians, Documentalists and Museology (FESABID), and Vice President of EBLIDA, European Bureau of Library, Information and Documentation Associations.

=== Honours and awards ===
Pérez-Salmerón was awarded with the IFLA Honorary Membership Award, IFLA's highest accolade, during the association's general assembly for her "impact and contributions to the library field". In his acceptance speech he made reference to access to information for all people.

In 2021 she also received the medal of honor from the Spanish Federation of Associations of Archivists, Librarians, Archaeologists, Museologists and Documentalists (ANABAD) for being "an integral Librarian, because she has exercised her professional activity in all areas possible".

In 2023 Pérez-Salmerón received the Gold Medal for Merit in Fine Arts from the Ministry of Culture and Sports of the Spanish Government.

== Selected works ==
- Amorós-Fontanals, J., Ontalba-Ruipérez, J., & Pérez-Salmerón, G. La intervenció de la biblioteca pública a Catalunya en les polítiques locals d’informació, 1999. En Item : Revista de biblioteconomia i documentació. COBDC pp. 35–60.
- Amorós-Fontanals, J., Ontalba-Ruipérez, J., & Pérez-Salmerón, G. La información local o comunitaria en los servicios de información de las bibliotecas públicas, 2000. En BiD : textos universitaris de biblioteconomia i documentació. Facultat de Biblioteconomia i Documentació. Universidad de Barcelona.
- Pérez-Salmerón, G. "Leer en digital en las nuevas bibliotecas del siglo XXI." En El copyright en cuestión - Diálogos sobre propiedad intelectual, 2011. J. Torres Ripa y J. A. Gómez Hernández (coords.), Bilbao, pp. 137–142.
- Gibert Riba, E.; Mulé Cardona, N.; Pérez-Salmerón, G. "Selección y acceso de recursos electrónicos en la Xarxa de Biblioteques Municipals de la provincia de Barcelona". En: Congreso Nacional de Bibliotecas Públicas, 2004, Salamanca, pp. 395–402.
- Maniega-Legarda, D., Pérez-Salmerón, G., & Guerrero-Torres, Y. “El Portal de Biblioteques de la Generalitat de Catalunya: un proyecto para los ciudadanos y los profesionales de la biblioteca pública, 2008”. En El profesional de la información. EPI SCP, Barcelona, pp. 183–187.
- Pérez-Salmerón, G. “2.0 integral dentro y fuera de la Biblioteca Nacional de España”.Anuario ThinkEPI, 2011, v. 5, pp. 11–12.
- Pérez-Salmerón, G. “Biblioteca pública y accesibilidad”. En Educación y biblioteca, 2003.
- Pérez-Salmerón, G. "Algunas propuestas para propulsar la Administración en línea. La biblioteca pública como portal de acceso al e-government." En: El profesional de la información 12.3 (2003): 226-230.
- Pérez-Salmerón, G. “BNE 2.0” I Seminario Internacional de la Biblioteca de Galicia. Bibliotecas digitales. 7 abril 2011.
- Pérez-Salmerón, G. "La Biblioteca Digital de Catalunya, Una aproximació des de la biblioteca pública." En Bibliodoc (2006): 71-100.
- Pérez-Salmerón, G. "La CEPSE, Central de Préstamo y Servicios Especiales de la Generalitat de Cataluña". En: Correo Bibliotecario Nº 98. octubre 2007.
- Pérez-Salmerón, G; Rivera, E.: "Administración en línea: el sistema de adquisición bibliotecaria". En: Congreso Nacional de Bibliotecas Públicas. Murcia, 2006. pp. 472–484.
- Pérez-Salmerón, G. “Selección cooperativa de webs del Servicio de Bibliotecas de la Diputación de Barcelona”. En: Correo Bibliotecario Nº 76 julio-agosto 2004.
- Pérez-Salmerón, G. The Spanish BNE project with Telefónica. XII Jornadas Españolas de Documentación. Malága 27 mayo 2011.
- Pérez-Salmerón, G. "Todo el saber en el bolsillo”. El País (7 de diciembre de 2010).
- Pérez-Salmerón, G. “Yo biblioteca, tú biblioteca, él biblioteca.” Huelva, 16 de junio de 2011.
- Pérez-Salmerón, G. “La BNE a l’abast de tothom:estratègies per aconseguir-ho” UB Facultat de Biblioteconomia i Documentació Barcelona. 30 de mayo 2011.
