= Palazzo del Capitano del Popolo =

Palazzo del Capitano del Popolo may refer to:

- Palazzo del Capitano del Popolo, Gubbio
- Palazzo del Capitano del Popolo, Orvieto
- Palazzo del Capitano del Popolo, Perugia
- Palazzo del Capitano del Popolo, Reggio Emilia
- Palazzo del Capitano del Popolo, Siena

== See also ==
- Palazzo del Popolo (disambiguation)
