= Orvieto (disambiguation) =

Orvieto is a city and comune in the Province of Terni, southwestern Umbria, Italy.

Orvieto may also refer to:

- Orvieto (album), live album by pianists Chick Corea and Stefano Bollani
- Orvieto DOC, Italian wine region located in Umbria and Lazio
- Orvieto Papacy, refuge of five popes during the 13th century
- Orvieto ware, in-glazed earthenware originally manufactured at Orvieto
- Laura Orvieto, Jewish Italian writer
