= Palazzo Conte Bracci, Orvieto =

Coordinates: 42.71915°N 12.11085°E

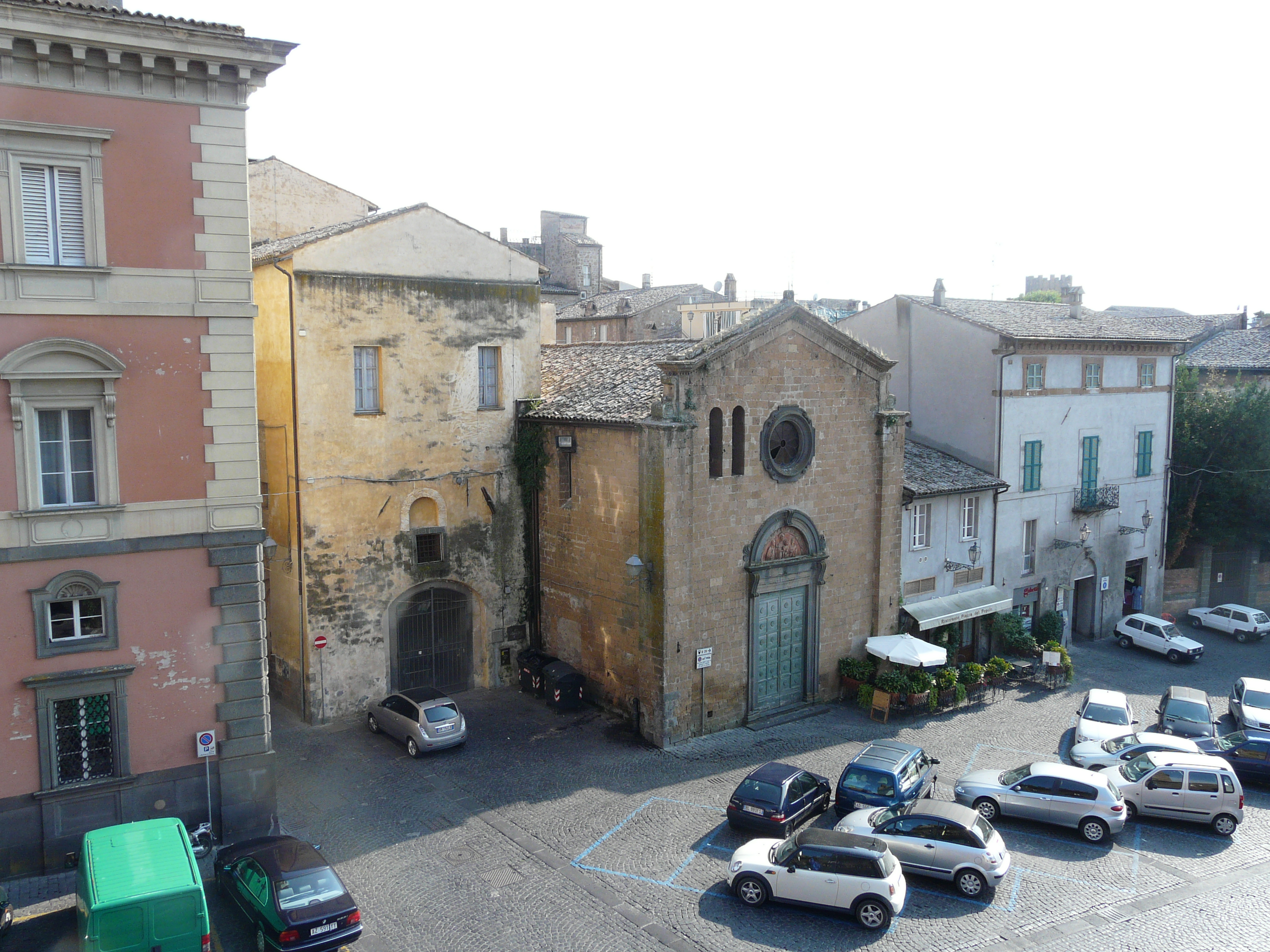
Westernmost facade windows of Palazzo Bracci, with San Rocco at center of photo, captured from the Palazzo del Capitano del Popolo

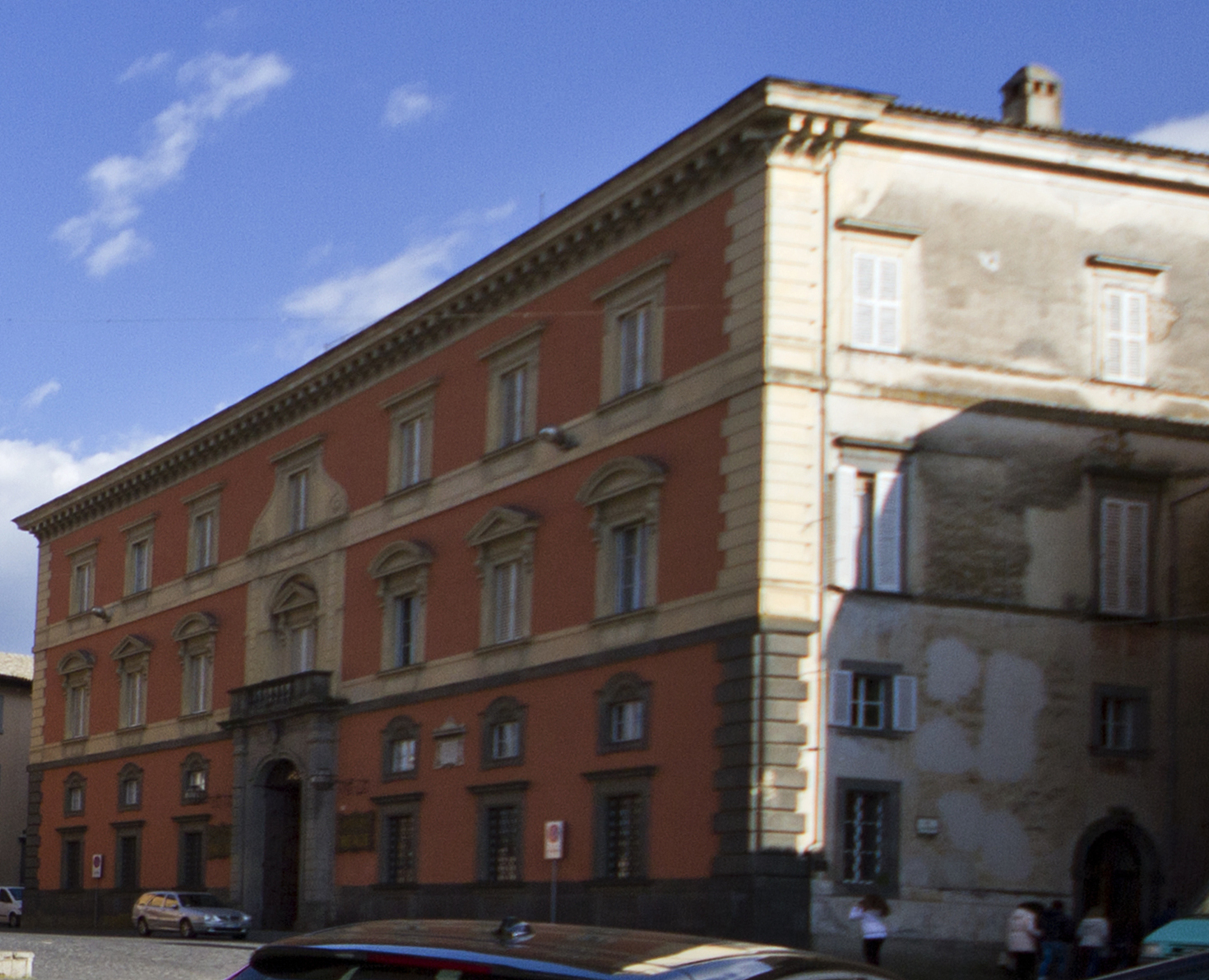

The Palazzo Conte Bracci, also called Bracci Testasecca is an aristocratic palace located on Piazza del Popolo in the historic center of Orvieto in the Region of Umbria, Italy. It stands directly across from the Gothic architecture Palazzo del Capitano del Popolo, and separated by the alleyway of Via del Costituente from the deconsecrated church of San Rocco.

The original Renaissance building on the site was refurbished during 1875–1881, including the facade, by Virginio Vespignani. The work was commissioned by the aristocrat and industrialist Conte Giuseppe Bracci Testasecca. Giuseppe was well known for financing the construction in 1888 of the Orvieto Funicular. A plaque on the second story of the facade recalls an 1891 stay by King Umberto I, hosted by the Count Bracci. Much of the palace is now occupied by an inn.
