= Palazzo dei Sette, Orvieto =

Coordinates: 42.71845°N 12.11054°E

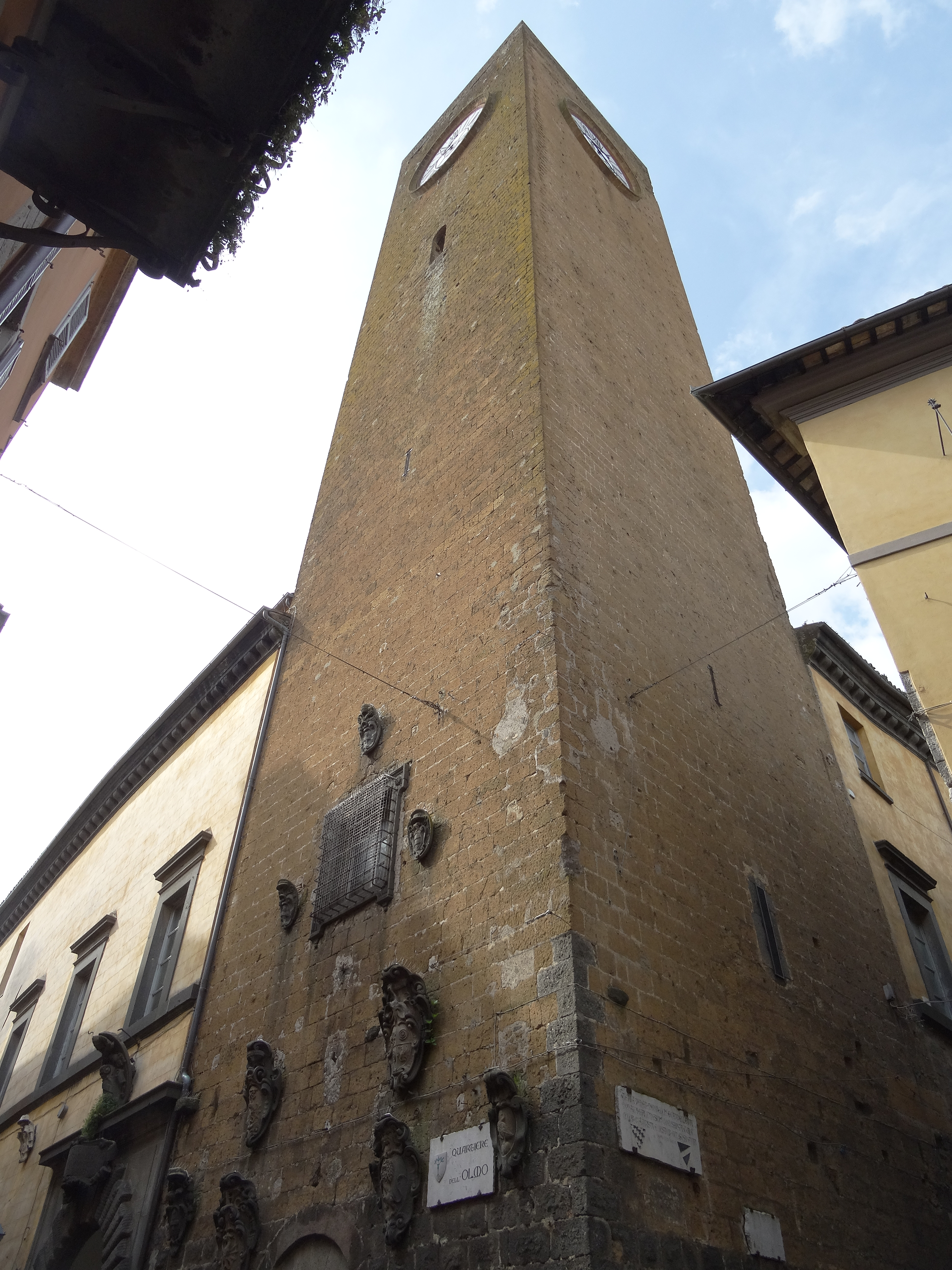
Torre del Moro and adjacent Palazzo dei Sette on the left

The Palazzo dei Sette, also called Palazzo per il Tribunale, Palazzo Apostolico, and Casa del Papa is a Renaissance architecture palace located in Corso Cavour#85, almost central to the upper historic city of Orvieto, region of Umbria, Italy. Adjacent to the palace is the square medieval Torre del Moro which, after climbing its 300 stairs, affords a view of the rest of the town and surrounding countryside.

== History and description ==
The palace and the adjacent tower were initially built by the Terza family, and later to house the papal household, but in 1319 it was granted to the commune to house the seven consuls, who represented guilds of the town. They were referred as the Signori sette or seven magistrates, who functioned as a local tribunal and council. These magistrates served a term of 2 months, during which they could not have contact with anyone outside the palace. In 1354, when Orvieto came under direct papal rule in 1354, under the local rule of cardinal Albornoz and pope Boniface IX Tomacelli, the palace became a papal residence, including for pope Alexander VI. In 1516 Pope Leo X again transferred the palace to the commune, as a residence for his appointed governor. In the 16th century the palace was refurbished by Ippolito Scalza. In 1831, pope Gregory XVI made the palace the provincial courthouse and jail. The plaque over the entrance recalls Pope Pius V in 1571

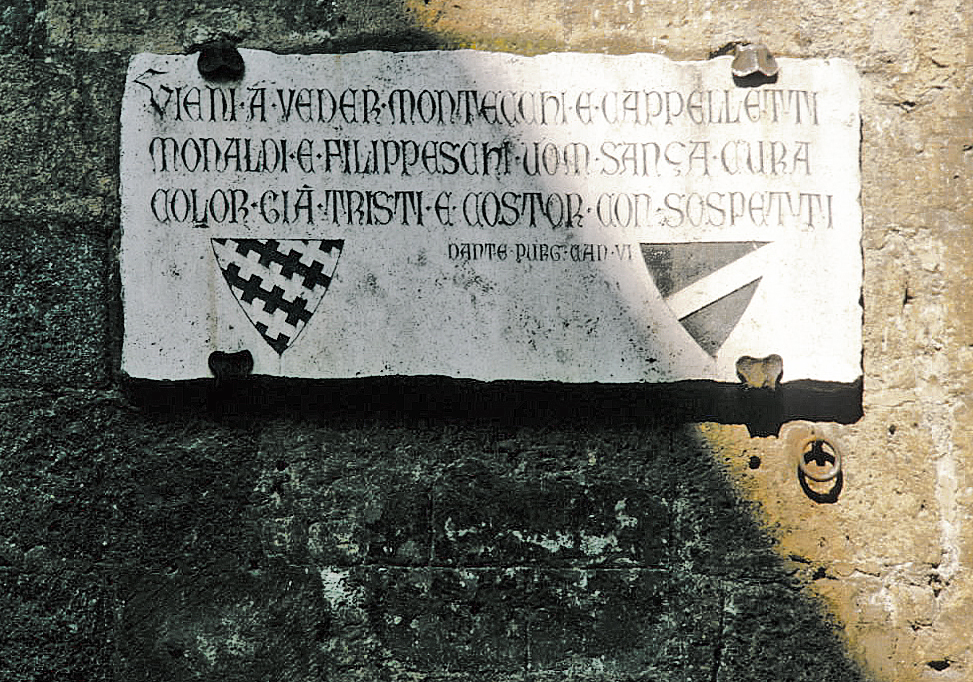
Plaque quoting Dante

Attached and adjacent to the palace is the 47-meter-tall (154 ft) stone tower, Torre del Moro. The intersection of Corso Cavour and Via del Duomo divides Orvieto into four quarters (rione): Serancia, San Giovenale, Postierla, and Santa Pace. The street runnin north along the flank of the Tower leads to the Palazzo del Capitano del Popolo; south to the Duomo. In 1875, the clock was added to the tower, as well as two bells. Around the entrance to the tower are nine coats of arms.

On one flank of the tower, a plaque recalls a line from the Purgatorio by Dante:

- Come see the Montagues and Capulets,
- Monaldi and Filipeschi, men without honor,
- the first suffering, and the others suspicious!

The plaque takes note, as Dante did, of the brutal civil discord caused by the Guelfs and Ghibellines in Orvieto, represented respectfully in Orvieto by the opposing Monaldeschi and Filippeschi families. A tower like this served as a redoubts and donjon or keep for medieval families.

The Torre del Moro until the 1500s was called the Torre del Papa but thereafter, its name was changed. Two possible reasons was due to the moor displayed on the heraldic shield of the nearby Palazzo Pucci or due to the nickname (the Moor) of a nobleman by the name of Raffaele di Sante, who owned nearby property. Another source states a depiction of a moor was hung from the tower during a horse race, and passing racers would poke at it with spears.

Apparently the bells of Torre del Moro and the Torre del Mauricio ring at different times, so that they are not confused.
