= San Lorenzo in Vineis =

Parish church and minor basilica in Viterbo, Italy

San Lorenzo delle Vigne or San Lorenzo in Vineis
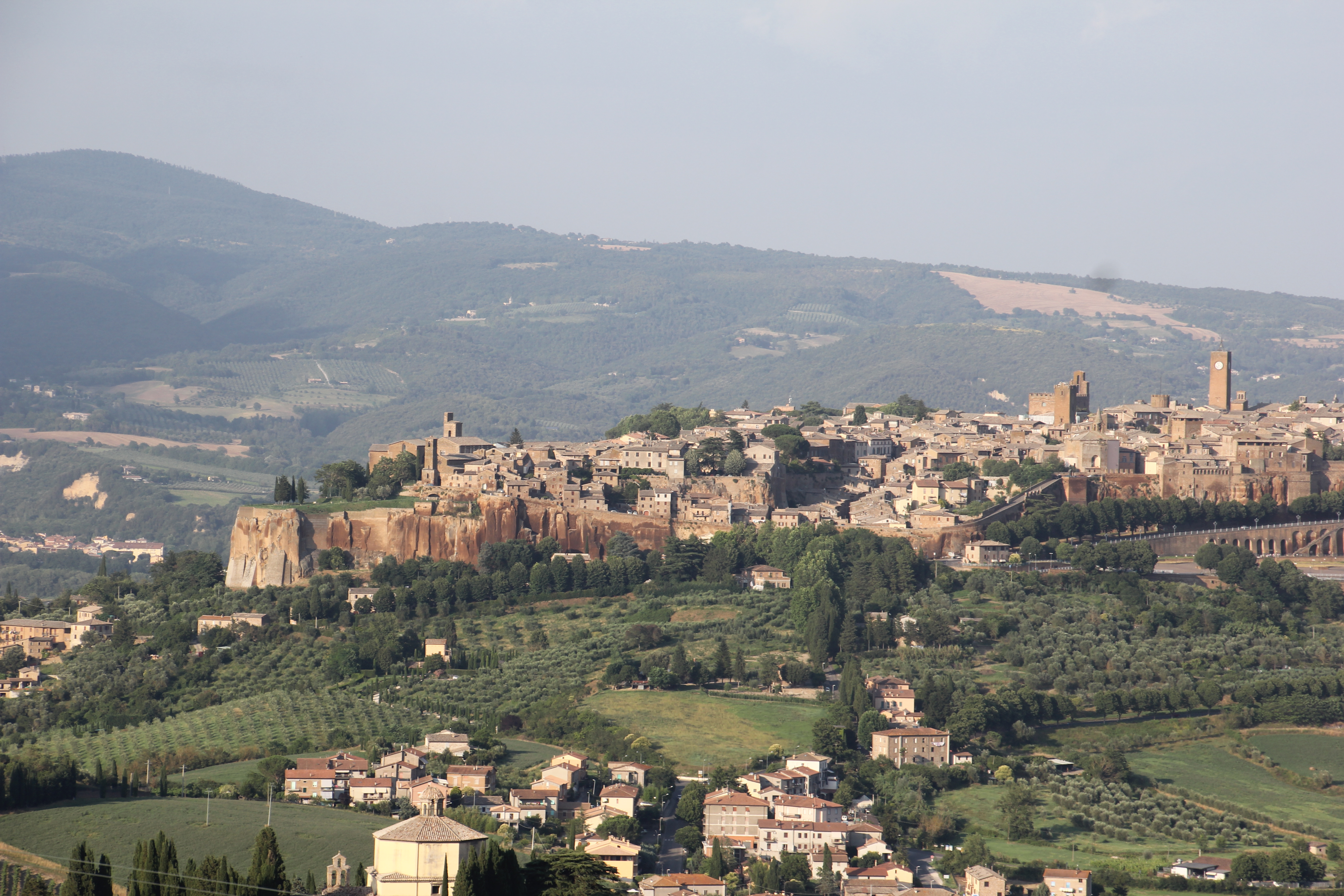
- The dome of San Lorenzo is captured at the bottom left of center

Religion
- Affiliation: Roman Catholic
- Province: Terni

Location
- Location: Orvieto, region of Umbria, Italy
- Interactive map of San Lorenzo delle Vigne or San Lorenzo in Vineis
- Coordinates: 42.71372°N 12.08884°E

Architecture
- Type: Church
- Style: Renaissance architecture
- Groundbreaking: 1237
- Completed: 13th century

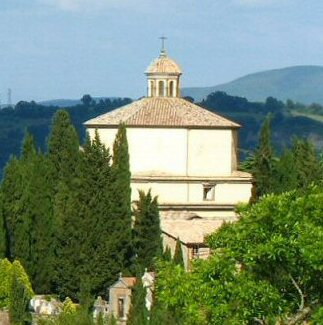

San Lorenzo in Vineis (Italian: San Lorenzo delle Vigne) is an octagonal layout, Renaissance style, Roman Catholic church, standing alongside a closed adjacent monastery building, located off SR71, adjacent to the Cimiterio Comunale, west of the plateau comprising the historic center of Orvieto, region of Umbria, Italy. The church, degraded by time, lightning strikes, and the 2016 earthquake, is undergoing restoration starting in 2022–2024. A different church, San Lorenzo de Arari, is located in the city center.

== History ==
By 1225, Pope Gregory IX had purchased lands of a vinyard outside of the city. By 1232, a monastery of Poor Clares was established here with the support of the Bishop Ranieri of Orvieto. As was typical of many early Franciscan monasteries, it was located perilously outside of the city walls. The suffix of in Vineis refers to its location among vineyards.

In 1354, Orvieto, Viterbo, Narni, and nearby towns were under the Ghibelline lord Giovanni di Vico, who was frequently battling with the Papal forces. The nuns were forced to relocate inside the walls of Orvieto, likely at San Lodovico and Santa Chiara. The monastery and church of San Lorenzo were ravaged in the battles between di Vico and the papal general Giordano Orsini.

A fresco of the Madonna and Child, painted in 1356, putatively was rediscovered in 1556 in the ruins, and this spurred veneration of the image, and thus the Commune commissioned Raffaello da Montelupo to design and build starting in 1557 the present church to house the icon and an adjacent convent, this time a male Franciscan monastery. Construction was patronized by Cardinal Girolamo Simoncelli and also by the archbishop of Santa Severina, and governor of Orvieto, Giovanni Battista Orsini. The entrance portico was flanked by corinthian columns on high plinths. The layout of the base of the church on the outside is square, but the interior and dome are octagonal. The octagonal dome structure and square layout resemble the architecture of Tempio del Santissimo Crocifisso in Todi; although that building was begun in 1588, some attribute its design to Bramante died in 1516. The Orvietan architect, Ippolito Scalza (1532 – 1617) worked at both the Todi church and in the reinforcing of San Lorenzo. Finally, it has some similarities to Santa Maria Nuova in Cortona, for which construction began in 1550 with designs putatively by Vasari.

By 1667, the church again was in near ruins. The nobleman Monaldo Monaldeschi della Cervara commissioned another restoration, followed by another in 1765. The monastery was suppressed in the 19th-century, but the church was likely spared destruction by the allocation of the adjacent site for the civic cemetery, designed by Virginio Vespignani in 1867.

A guide from 1883, noted the church had a main altar and four side altars; the latter included the first on the right dedicated to Sant'Antonio of Padua, the second, to San Pietro d'Alcantara, while the first on the left dedicated to the Crucifixion, while the second on the left was dedicated to St Lawrence (San Lorenzo). The main altar had the venerated 1356 Madonna and Child fresco. The 13th-century Crucifix once in the altar of the Crucifix was moved to the Museo del Opera del Duomo.
