= Palazzo del Popolo =

Palazzo del Popolo ('Palace of the People') may refer to:

- Palazzo del Popolo, Todi
- Palazzo del Popolo, Florence, now known as Palazzo Vecchio

== See also ==
- Palazzo del Capitano del Popolo (disambiguation)
