= Piero di Puccio =

Italian painter

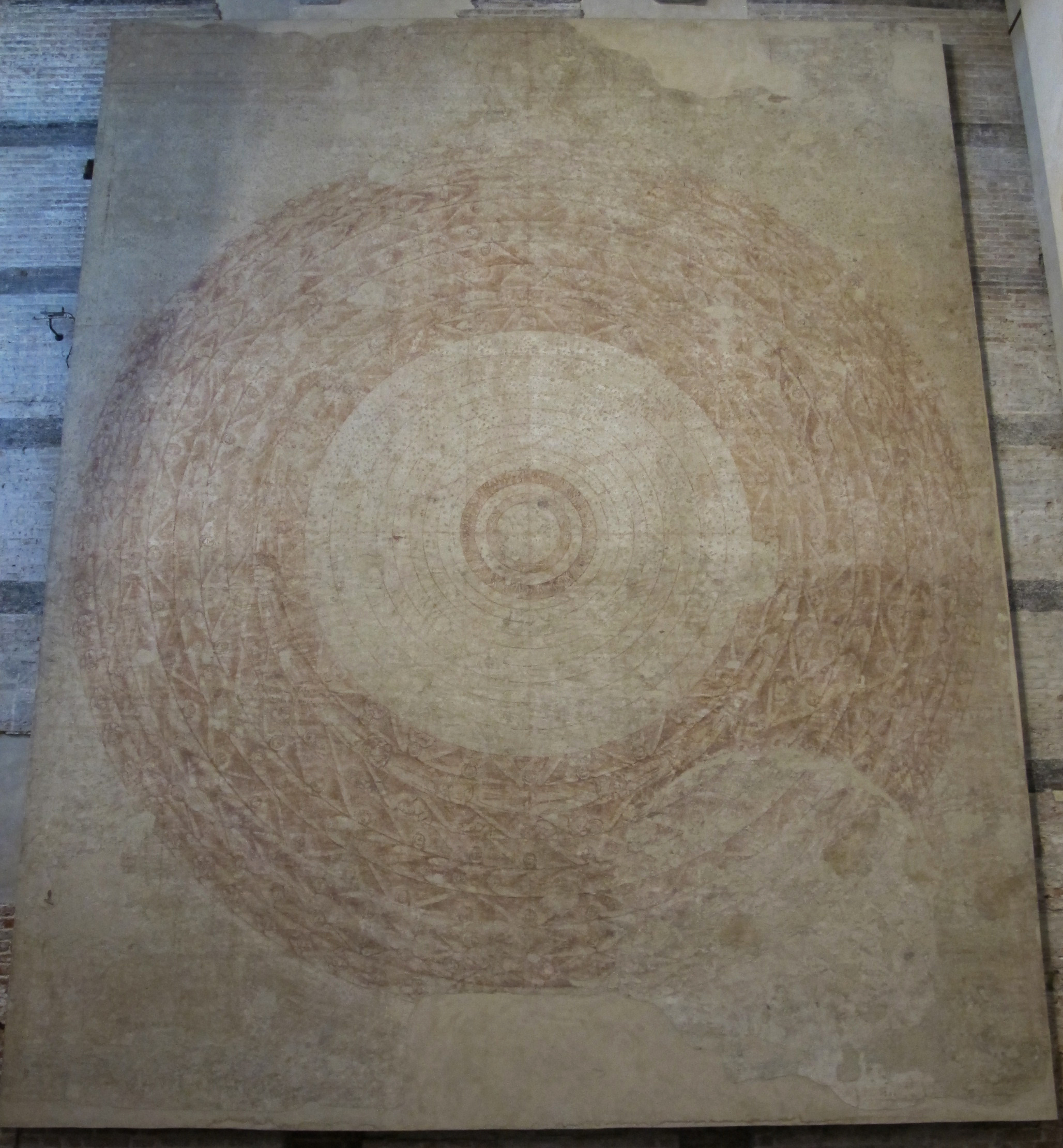
Cosmography Theological by Piero di Puccio, 1389-1391

Piero di Puccio was a fourteenth-century Italian painter of the Gothic period, active mainly in Orvieto. He is also known as Pietro di Puccio. He painted a fresco of stories from Genesis, from the Creation to the Deluge on the North wall of Camposanto Monumentale in Pisa. The fresco was devastated during the allied bombing during World War II.
