= San Lodovico, Orvieto =

Church in Orvieto, Italy

Coordinates: 42.71742°N 12.10676°E

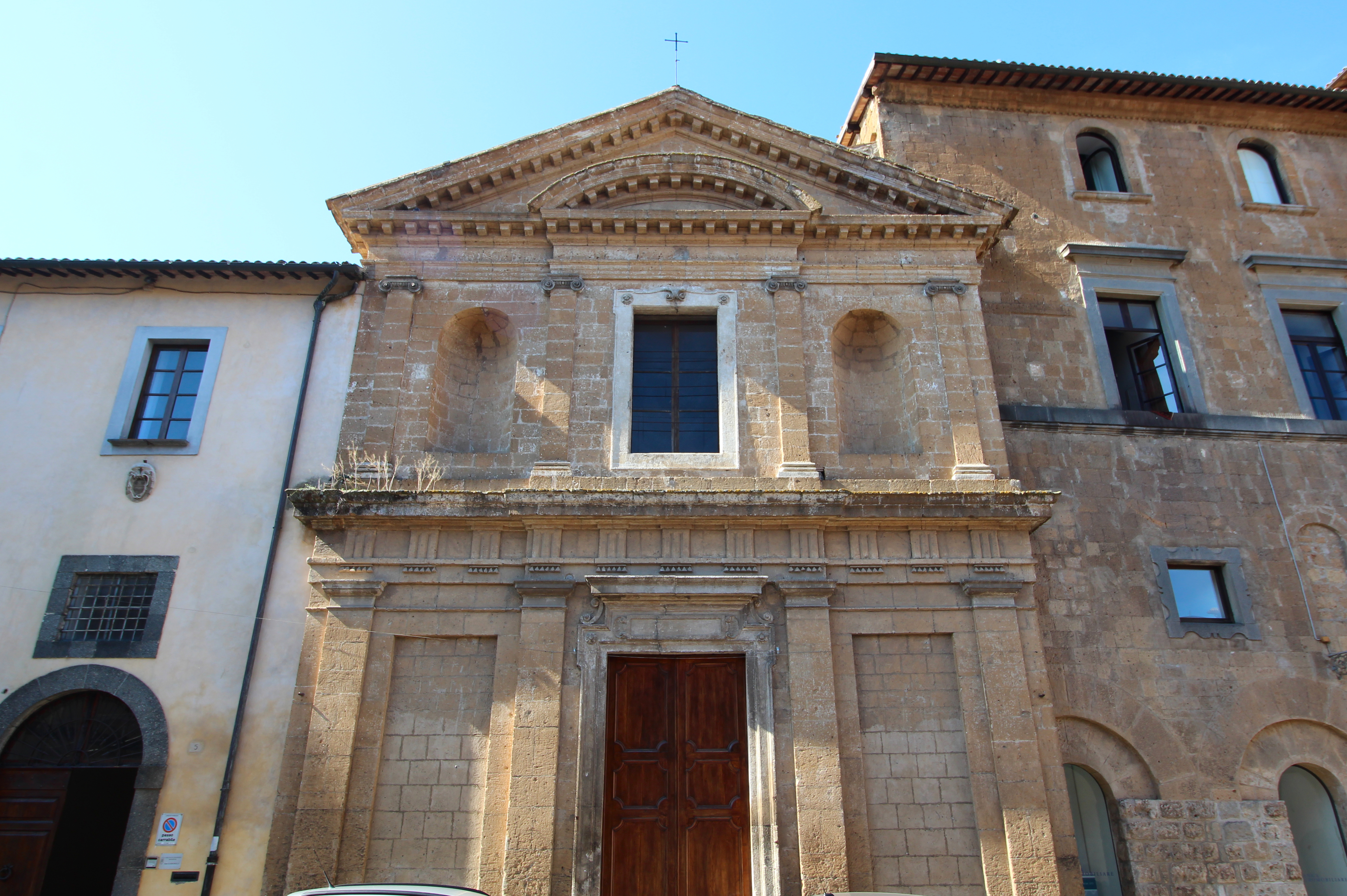
Facade with monastery on right

San Lodovico is a Baroque-style, Roman Catholic church and former monastery located on 5 Piazza de' Ranieri in Orvieto, Umbria, central Italy. The monastery (Istituto San Lodovico) is occupied by Sisters of the Company of Maria Nostra Signora, a religious order which runs a nursery school and hostel lodgings.

== History and description ==
A church and monastery were documented at the site since 1350, they seem to have been associated with the Franciscans and perhaps founded by order of St Louis of Toulouse, and housing nuns of the order of Poor Clares from the local monasteries of San Lorenzo delle Vigne and Santa Chiara, who took refuge here during the wars that besieged Orvieto in the late 14th century. In 1436, Bishop Francesco Monaldeschi moved them permanently to San Lodovico and Santa Chiara.

The church, whose facade originally faced south towards the cliffs, was rebuilt in 1746, and inverted to face Piazza Ranieri. The Clarissan monastery was suppressed by the Napoleonic occupation and in 1834, it was restored to the nuns of the Company of Mary Our Lady (founded by St Jeanne de Lestonnac in 1607). The nuns since then have staffed schools for girls and young women.

In the church, restored from 2000 to 2005, the main altar is dedicated to San Lodovico (Louis of Toulouse) with an altarpiece depicting St Louis in adoration of the Madonna and Child (1637) by Girolamo, the brother of Cesare Nebbia. One of the side altars has a complex altarpiece, attributed to attributed to Andrea di Giovanni, Depicting The Adoration of Christ by the Innocents, Four Evangelists, and Saints (1410).
