= Orvieto ware =

Orvieto ware is tin-glazed earthenware (maiolica) originally manufactured at Orvieto, Italy, where it was produced from the 13th century.

Orvieto ware is mostly of green or manganese purple color or brown (similar to their faience (Paterna ware) templates from Paterna, Spain), but also blue or yellow. It mixed Gothic and Middle East style elements, and often comes in the form of a jug with a large lip, as well as bowls. Decorative elements include animals and birds, as well as leaves and geometric patterns.

The Museo dell'Opera del Duomo in Orvieto held a collection of medieval examples.

A potter from Orvieto was documented in 1211, and the town had a potters' guild in 1250.
