= Palazzo del Capitano del Popolo, Perugia =

Building in Perugia, Italy

Palazzo del Capitano del Popolo
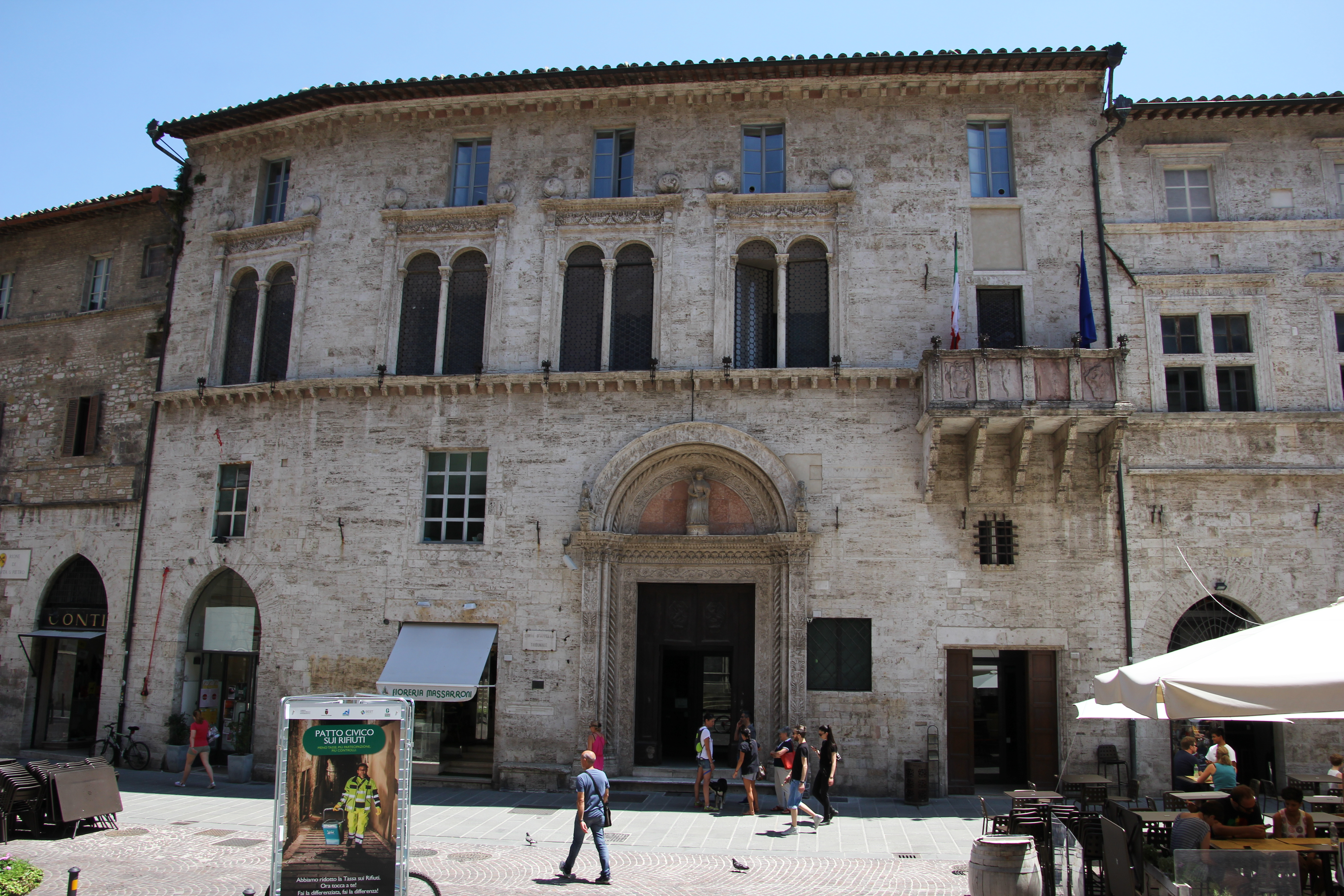
- Interactive map of the Palazzo del Capitano del Popolo area

General information
- Location: Piazza Giacomo Matteotti 22; Perugia, Umbria, Italy
- Coordinates: 43°6′39.83″N 12°23′23.7″E
- Construction started: 1473
- Completed: 1481

Design and construction
- Architects: Gasparino d'Antonio, Leone di Matteo

The Palazzo del Capitano del Popolo is a historic building in Perugia, Italy, located in Piazza Giacomo Matteotti, within the Porta San Pietro district. It currently houses the Court of Appeal, the Office of the Attorney General, and various municipal offices.

== History ==
Also known as the Palazzo del Bargello, it was constructed between 1473 and 1481 by Lombard builders Gasparino d'Antonio and Leone di Matteo to accommodate the city's judiciary. It stands on Piazza del Sopramuro (now Piazza Matteotti), a 13th-century artificial terrace built over a steep slope outside the Etruscan city walls. The building, combining Renaissance architecture with Gothic elements, served as the seat of the Capitano del popolo, a key civic authority.

Originally crowned with crenellations similar to those of the nearby Palazzo dei Priori, the structure lost its top floor in the 1741 earthquake. It was later reinforced and restored by architect Luigi Vanvitelli.

== Description ==
The façade features four mullioned windows with garlands, a loggia for public proclamations supported by large corbels, and a richly decorated portal with twisted columns, two Perugia griffins grasping a calf and a ram, and a lunette depicting an allegory of Justice—a sword-bearing woman with a smile—accompanied by the Latin inscription "Iustitia Virtutum Domina" (1472).

To the left of the building are Gothic arches leading to the Lanari Loggia, the 1932 covered market, and a panoramic terrace overlooking Assisi, Monte Subasio, and Torgiano.

== Università Vecchia ==
The adjacent building to the right was begun in 1453 with a ground floor of Gothic arches. In the late 15th century, Pope Sixtus IV relocated the Studium Perusinum—now the University of Perugia, one of Italy's earliest universities—to this site. Between 1490 and 1520, two upper floors with Renaissance cross windows were added, attributed to Fiorenzo di Lorenzo. Since the early 19th century, the building has been used for judicial offices.
