= Palazzo del Capitano del Popolo, Orvieto =

Italian palace

Coordinates: 42.71930°N 12.11060°E

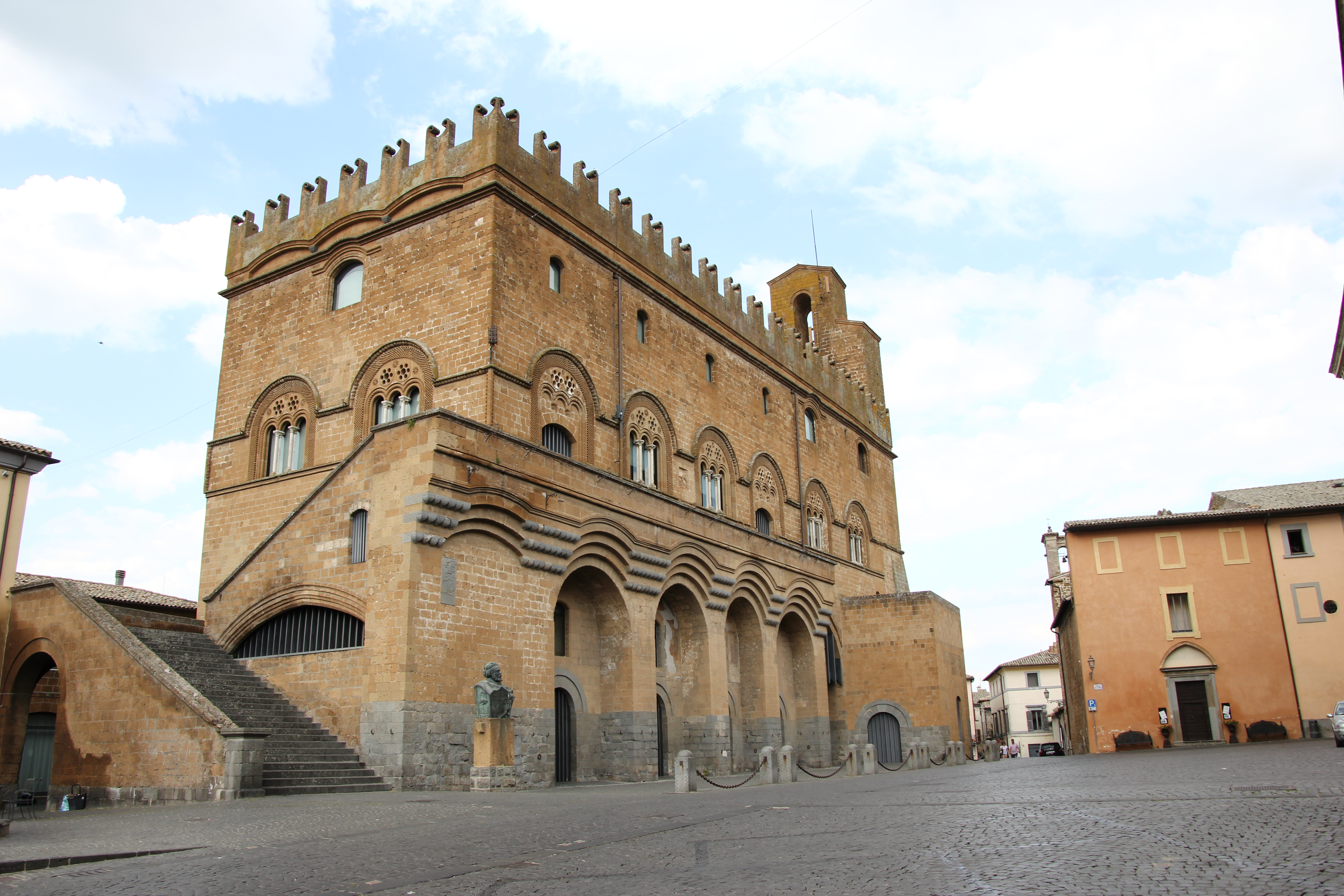
View of Palazzo del Capitano del Popolo

The Palazzo del Capitano del Popolo, also known as the Palazzo del Podesta, is a late-Romanesque-Gothic architecture, late 13th-century civic palace located in Piazza del Popolo, in the historic center of Orvieto, region of Umbria, Italy. The palace now houses some municipal offices and the main hall is used for cultural events and meetings.

Surrounding the Piazza del Popolo is also the palaces named for the Bracci and Simoncelli families, and the deconsecrated church of San Rocco.

== History and description ==
This was erected as a single story loggia in 1156 by pope Adrian IV as a papal palace (Palazzo Apostolico) adjacent to the church of San Bernardo. However, it suffered grave damage during the wars of the following century, and was restored by pope Alexander IV in 1255. Thereafter it served as the residence of the Podestà, and later the Captain of the People, both representing the supreme local magistrate representing the pope.

The structure was enlarged within ten years of its original construction and, in 1315, the bell tower was added and in the subsequent year, a great bell was hung there. The upper part of the structure was covered in 1472 and the large hall divided into two rooms, one large and the other small. The larger of the two occupied an area that corresponds approximately to the room known today as the Sala dei Quattrocento. Subsequently, the building functioned as a residence for the Capitano del Popolo, the Podestà and the Signori Sette.

The reconstruction, using local pink tufa stone, created a rectangular hall as a piano nobile, standing upon five solid arcades. The second floor has six arches facing the Piazza del Popolo, four of which now have mullioned windows. The arches are flanked by a brick fretwork consisting of protruding bricks or voids, and surmounted with circular floral or geometric (plate tracery) in the tympanum. The arches are also flanked by The second floor was accessed by a wide staircase, leading to a tribune or terrace from where the magistrate could speak to those assembled below. At one time the stairs and tribune were roofed. The stairs alter the palace from a fortress-like exterior to this open access that symbolize the citizen's new ease of entry to the Council Hall itself.

From 1596 one of the lower-section rooms housed the Studium, which had been re-instituted a few years earlier by Lorenzo Magalotti. Students of law, theology and logic came here to study twice a day, each time the bell of Palazzo del Popolo rang, until 1651. Few records of this university appear after this date. Some sources indicate that it dates back to 1013 and had connections with names such as the Benedictine monks Graziano and Gozio of Orvieto.

In the 16th century, a scholarly society in Orvieto, known as the Accademia de Nobili, or of the Phoenix or of the Confusi; was allowed to build a small theater, designed by Sforzino da Todi and decorated by Ricciolini, in the palazzo. It was inaugurated during the visit of Queen Christina, Queen of Sweden.

In the ground floor of the Palazzo, facing the Piazza del Popolo, was once found the offices of the Monte di Pieta, a pawn shop lending money mainly to the poor. It was established in 1463 under bishop Marinonim and the Franciscan friar Fra Bartolomeo da Colle, and with the support of Pope Pius II. A plaque with antisemitic overtones at the site read: To relieve the poverty of the poor and to depress the usury of the Jews, This Monte di Pieta was permitted by Pius II and erected and endowed by Orvietan piety.
