= Orvieto =

City and comune in Umbria, Italy

- Comune
- Città di Orvieto
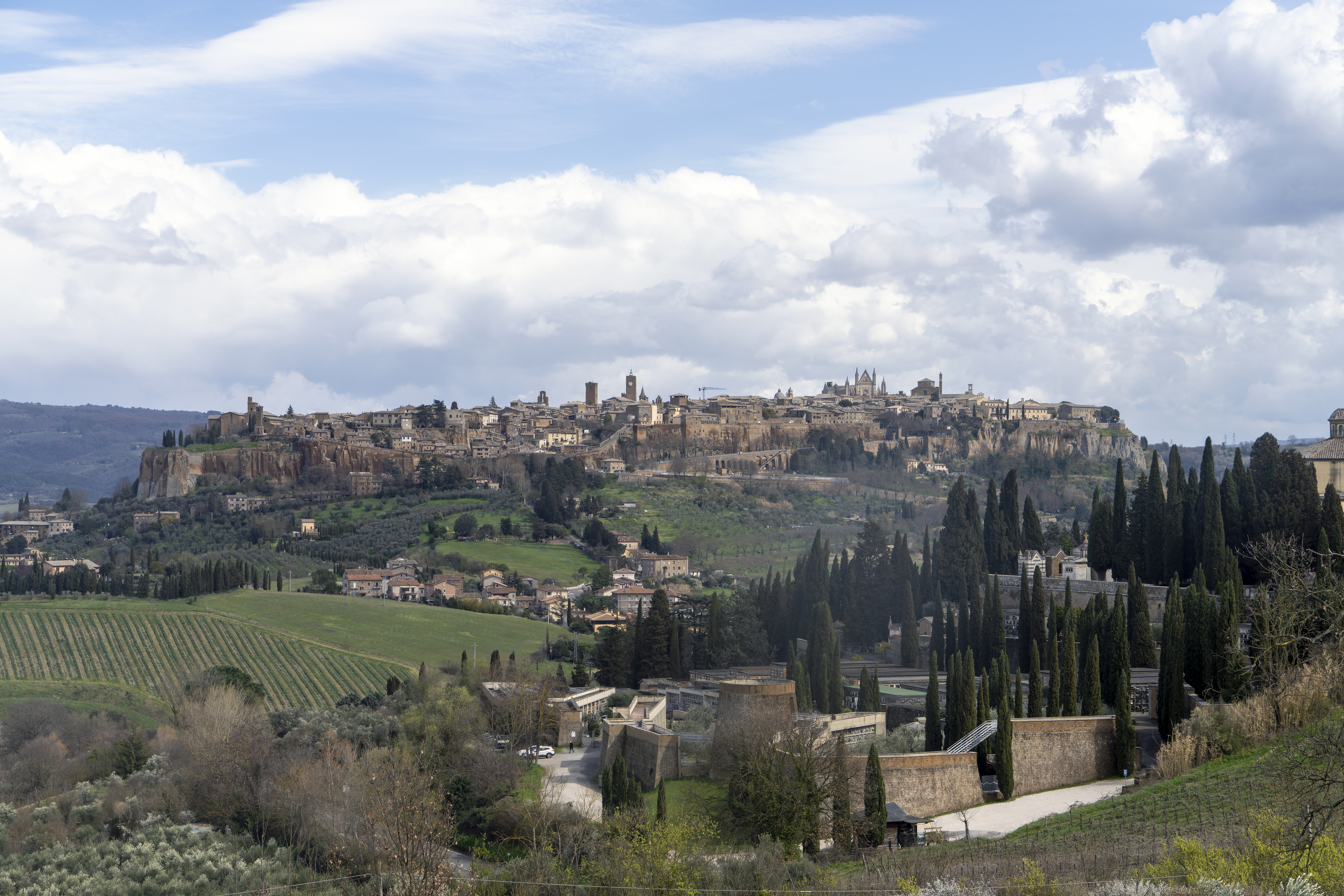
- View of Orvieto

- Coat of arms

- Location within Italy Location within Umbria
- Coordinates: 42.7182°N 12.108269°E
- Country: Italy
- Region: Umbria
- Province: Terni (TR)

Government
  - Mayor: Roberta Tardani (P)

Area
  - Total: 281.27 km^{2} (108.60 sq mi)
- Elevation: 325 m (1,066 ft)

Population (1 January 2025)
  - Total: 19,196
  - Density: 68.248/km^{2} (176.76/sq mi)
- Demonym: Orvietani
- Time zone: UTC+1 (CET)
  - Summer (DST): UTC+2 (CEST)
- Postal code: 05018
- Dialing code: 0763
- Patron saint: Saint Joseph
- Saint day: 19 March
- Website: Official website

Orvieto (Italian: [orˈvjɛːto]) is a city and comune in the Province of Terni, southwestern Umbria, Italy, situated on the flat summit of a large butte of volcanic tuff. The city rises dramatically above the almost-vertical faces of tuff cliffs that are completed by defensive walls built of the same stone.

== Etymology ==
The name Orvieto derives from the Latin Urbs vetus ("old city"), a designation that appears for the first time in Procopius in the form Οὐρβιβεντός. It is also attested in Paul the Deacon (Historia Langobardorum, IV, 32). The name was adopted in contrast to the "new" Volsinii established by the Romans on a different site.

== History ==
=== Antiquity ===
Volsinii, whose origins are ancient and unknown, was one of the most prosperous cities of Etruria, as attested by the monuments of its necropolis. Ancient coins bearing the name velsu are known. The location of Etruscan Volsinii long remained uncertain, with some placing it at Bolsena and others at the site of Orvieto; it is now identified with the hill on which Orvieto stands, as shown by numerous necropolises, while the Roman Volsinii occupied the site of modern Bolsena, as demonstrated by excavations and discoveries of Roman antiquities.

Volsinii was one of the twelve cities of the Etruscan Confederation and is counted among the capita Etruriae. It is described as situated among wooded hills.

Wars between the Romans and the Volsinians are recorded in the years AUC 362 (392 BCE) and AUC 363 (391 BCE). Taking advantage of famine and plague in Rome, the Volsinians, allied with the Salpinates, raided Roman territory in 391 BC, but were defeated; 8,000 were taken prisoner, and they obtained a 20-year truce on condition of restoring the plunder and supplying pay for the Roman army for a year.

In AUC 310 (444 BCE), allied with other Etruscan cities except Arretium, they took part in the siege of Sutrium. The war ended with their defeat at Lake Vadimo, marking the first blow to Etruscan power. Three years later the consul Publius Decius Mus captured several of their strongholds. Lucius Postumius Megellus later devastated their territory and defeated them beneath the walls of the city, killing 2,800; Volsinii, Perugia, and Arezzo then sought peace.

Triumphs over the Volsinians are recorded, and they were finally subdued in 280 BC. The ancient city was destroyed, and a new one arose in another location.

=== Early Middle Ages ===
During the barbarian invasions Orvieto was occupied by Alaric and Odoacer, then ruled by Theodoric. Vitiges placed a garrison there against the Byzantines, but Belisarius besieged and captured it. In 606 AD it passed to the Lombards under Agilulf.

By the 7th century the city already had its own bishops, as attested in the letters of Pope Gregory I referring to the "episcopus de Urbeveteri".

From 474 to 774 it experienced successive invasions and settlements of barbarian peoples, including Lombard rule, until the defeat of Desiderius by Charlemagne, after which it formed part of the donation to the papacy.

Around 975, under Pope Benedict VII, the first two consuls were created with the counsel of one hundred citizens. Later, seven officials representing the arts were elected, drawn in rotation from 28 groups and renewed every two months. The election of Gerbert as Pope Sylvester II is connected with a reordering of the city’s government according to Roman laws.

=== High Middle Ages ===
In the 11th century Orvieto formed as a self-governing municipality. In 1157 the city concluded a treaty with Pope Adrian IV, which marked a strengthening of papal influence and the beginning of Guelph–Ghibelline conflict in the city. Orvieto became a Guelph stronghold in central Italy, and it faced attacks by Ghibelline exiles as well as clashes connected with Frederick I and Henry IV.

In 1199 the rector Pietro di Parenzo was killed, after which the noble consuls who had governed for 230 years were replaced by a podestà. In 1200 the bishop Riccardo was elected podestà, and Gualfredo Bovacciano, bishop of Chiusi, became captain of the people. This system lasted about 140 years.

In 1215 Orvieto established the General Council of the Four Hundred. Further institutional developments followed in the 13th century, including the creation of the office of Captain of the People in 1250 and, in 1256, a government of craft elders led by a prior. In 1292 the magistracy of the Seven Lords was created.

From 1211 factions emerged between the Filippeschi and the Monaldeschi, aligned respectively with imperial and ecclesiastical interests. Attempts at reconciliation were made, but conflicts continued. The Filippeschi were defeated in 1313. The Monaldeschi divided into four branches (del Cervo, del Cane, della Vipera, and dell’Aquila) and further internal divisions prolonged the strife, with violence including the burning of houses and destruction of towers.

Orvieto participated in wider conflicts, including the battle of Montaperti in 1260. It supported Florence and received military aid in return. At the height of its power, its territory extended widely, from Chiusi to the Val d’Orcia, including Monte Amiata, reaching the Tyrrhenian Sea near Orbetello, and extending toward the Tiber Valley and Lake Trasimeno.

In 1263 the miracle of Bolsena occurred, and in 1264 the feast of Corpus Domini was instituted. Distinguished figures gathered in the city. In 1290 the foundation stone of the cathedral was laid. In 1316, Pope John XXII instituted the first Corpus Christi procession in Orvieto due to its association with the miracle.

Between 1281 and 1284 Pope Martin IV resided in Orvieto; the period was marked by an influx of French and a popular revolt.

Pope John XXII in 1316 instituted the first Corpus Christi procession in Orvieto due to its miracle of Bolsena in his speech. A studium generale existed from the 13th to the 14th century, confirmed in 1227 and again in 1376, with privileges granted to teachers and students from outside the city. Orvieto was then a large town: its population numbered about 30,000 at the end of the 13th century.

=== Late Middle Ages ===
The transfer of the papal seat to Avignon led to decline. Internal conflicts resumed, including violent episodes in the 14th century.

In August 1313 the Filippeschi were expelled. Political life then saw the emergence of the Beffati and Malcorini factions, with the Monaldeschi divided between them. From 1334 to 1337 Ermanno Monaldeschi della Cervara became the first lord. In 1354 Cardinal Albornoz occupied the city, and Orvieto submitted to the Papal State.

The Western Schism began in 1380, with Urban VI in Rome opposed by Clement VII in Avignon. In that year Berardo Monaldeschi della Cervara entered Orvieto by force with Breton support and ruled in the name of Clement VII. In 1387 Urban VI ordered a siege, during which bridges, roads, mills, and the aqueduct were destroyed. In 1391 Boniface IX sent Cardinal Manupello and Giovanni Tomacello, and a peace was concluded. Orvieto then experienced a succession of lordships, including Rinaldo Orsini (1378–1390), Biordo Michelotti (1395–1398), and Giovanni Tomacello (1398–1404), with the city remaining under Giovanni Tomacello in the early 15th century.

In the early 15th century Ladislaus of Naples took control, followed by oppressive rule under his officials. Continued struggles between factions led to expulsions and further violence.

Further lordships followed in the 15th century, including Braccio Fortebraccio (1416–1420) and Gentile di Arrigo Monaldeschi della Vipera, also given as della Sala (1437–1449). During this period factional alignments shifted: the Muffati moved from Ghibelline to Guelf positions, while the Malcorini shifted from pro-Church to imperial sympathies. In 1450 the Muffati prevailed; Arrigo Monaldeschi was killed, Gentile was banished, and the city was handed to Pope Nicholas V.

After 1450, Orvieto was permanently incorporated into the Papal States. In the same context the Rocca Berulla and Rocca Ripesena were destroyed by the people. In 1465 peace was sealed by a marriage between Pietro Antonio Monaldeschi della Vipera and Giovanna di Gentile Monaldeschi della Cervara.

=== Early Modern era ===
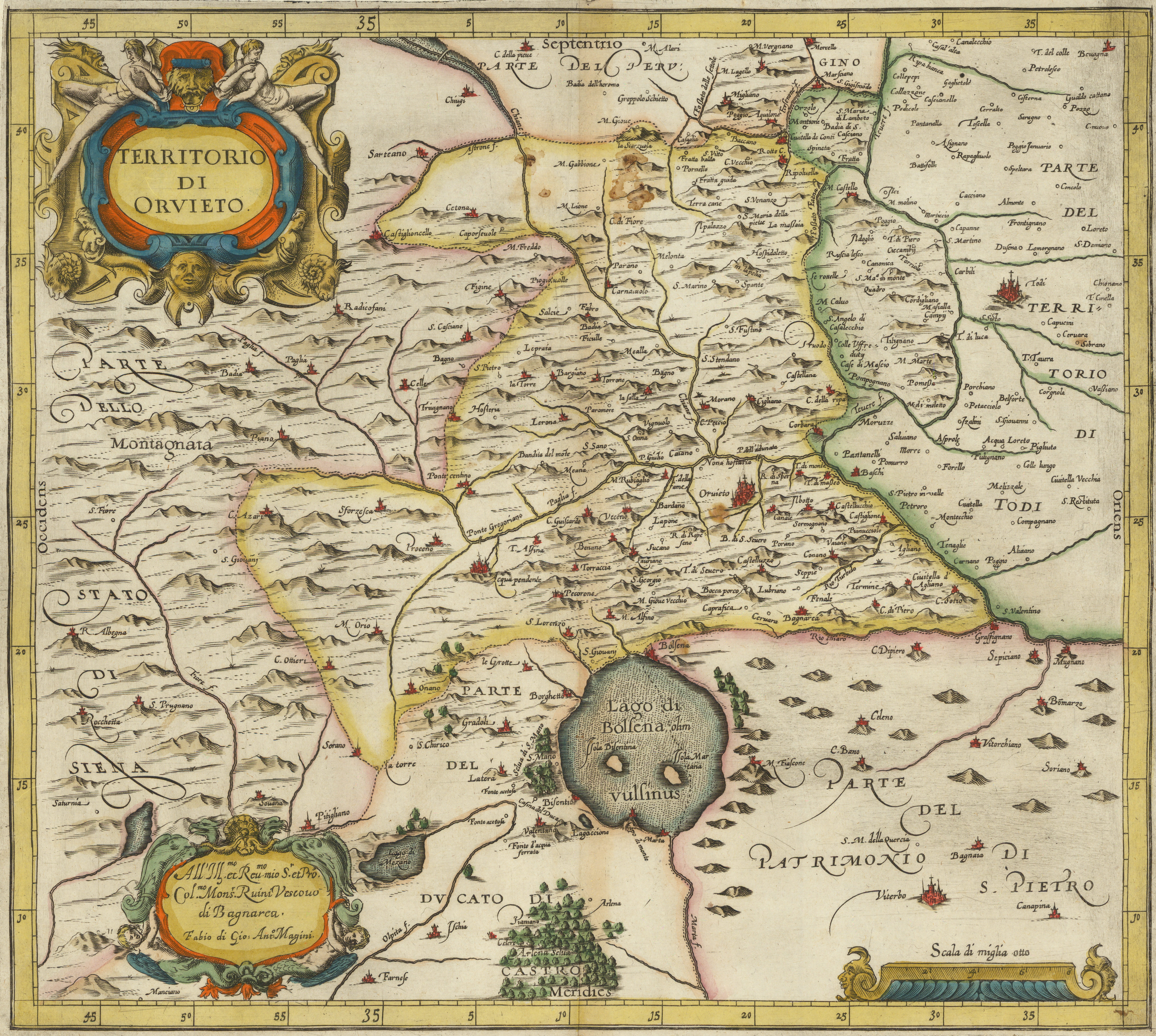
Map showing the extent of the territory of Orvieto in 1620, created by Giovanni Antonio Magini

In the 16th century, Orvieto experienced a civil and cultural revival connected with papal influence, alongside reduced political autonomy. In 1606, under Paul V, the municipality obtained the city fortress from the Governor General of the Holy Church.

In the 17th century papal centralization further limited older sovereign rights, and only four castles remained under direct municipal control. In the late 18th century the city sought to avoid inclusion in the Patrimony of Saint Peter and remained a separate province.

=== Contemporary period ===
In 1798–1799 Orvieto became part of the Roman Republic and was constituted as a canton. Between 1800 and 1809 it served as the seat of a general government during the first restoration. In the Napoleonic period it was annexed to the French Empire and became the chief town of a canton in the Subprefecture of Todi, Department of Trasimeno.

In 1816 it returned to the Papal State and became the seat of a district government within the Delegation of Viterbo. An edict of Cardinal Bernetti on 5 July 1831 created a new Delegation of Orvieto, separated from Viterbo. A law of Cardinal Antonelli on 22 November 1850 incorporated the Orvieto province into the Rome district.

In 1860 volunteers led by Colonel Masi, the Cacciatori del Tevere, forced the papal garrison to surrender and pursued it toward Viterbo. Orvieto then obtained annexation to the forming Kingdom of Italy. After 1860 Orvieto joined the province of Umbria, with district and subdistrict roles noted.

On 2 January 1927, a royal decree abolished the province of Umbria and created the provinces of Perugia and Terni, assigning Orvieto to Terni.

== Geography ==
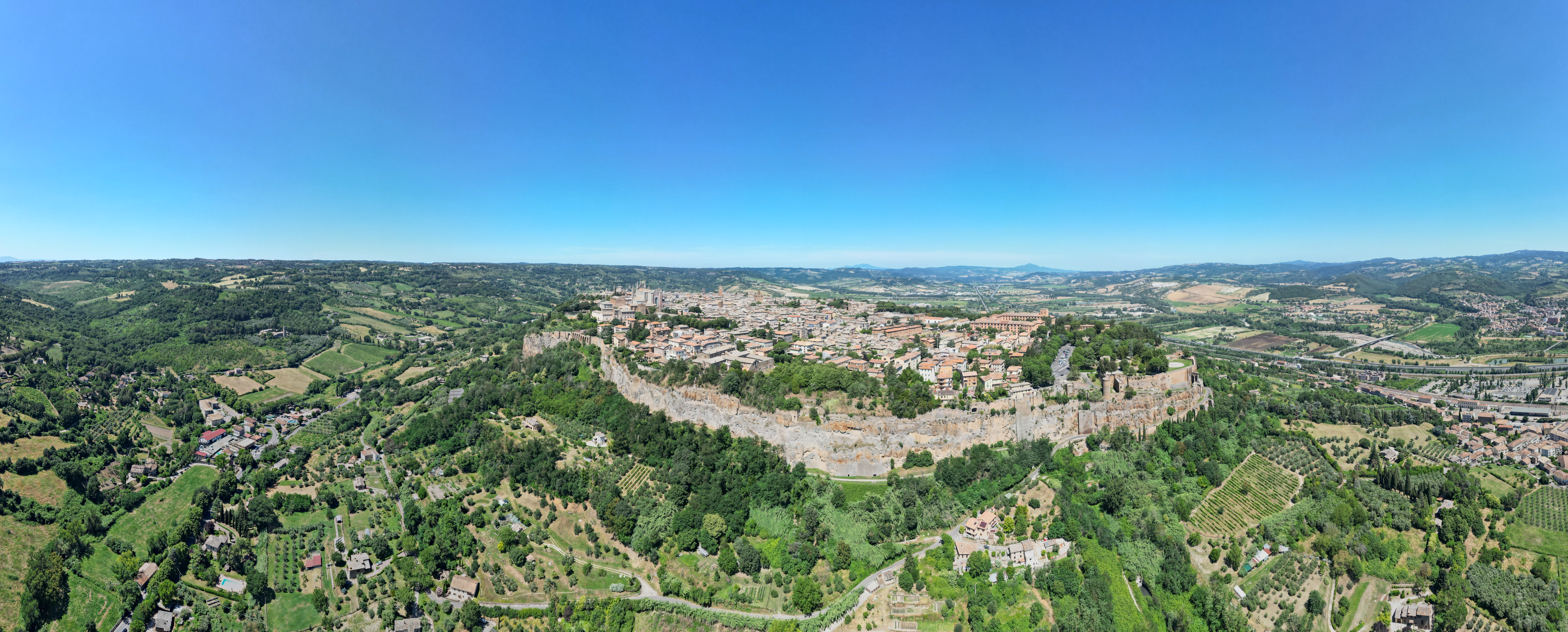
Aerial perspective of Orvieto, showing its flat summit on a large butte of volcanic tuff

Orvieto stands on a high and isolated hill of Pliocene formation, crowned by volcanic tuff. The town lies at an elevation of 315 metres (1,033 ft) above sea level and about 200 metres (660 ft) above the valley below.

It rises in isolation amid fertile countryside near the confluence of the Paglia and Chiani rivers. Its position rendered walls unnecessary, as it is naturally fortified and accessible only by a single steep way, making defense possible with minimal forces.

The territory is characterized by fertile hills and is crossed across its entire length by the road from Città della Pieve to Montefiascone, passing through Orvieto.

Orvieto stands on a high and isolated hill of Pliocene formation, crowned by volcanic tuff. It rises on the right side of the fertile and pleasant valley irrigated by the river Paglia.

The city is divided into four districts: Soliano, later called della Stella, Sarancia, Olmo, and Corsica.

=== Subdivisions ===
The municipality includes the localities of Bagni, Baschi Scalo, Benano, Bivio Canale, Bivio Corsica, Canale Nuovo, Canale Vecchio, Canino, Canonica, Case Maggi, Case Negroni, Chiesa Bardano, Chiesa Botto, Chiesa Capretta, Chiesa Osa, Chiesa Prato, Chiesa Villa Felici, Ciconia, Colonnetta di Prodo, Corbara, Corsica, Fontanelle di Bardano, Fossatello, Gabelletta, Morrano Nuovo, Morrano Vecchio, Orvieto, Orvieto Scalo, Osarella, Osteria di Biagio, Padella, Pian del Vantaggio, Ponte di Ferro, Prodo, Rocca Ripesena, Sferracavallo, Stazione di Castiglione, Sugano, Tamburino, Torre San Severo, Trinità, Villanova.

In 2021, 3,175 people lived in rural dispersed dwellings not assigned to any named locality. At the time, the most populous localities were Orvieto proper (4,958), Ciconia (4,349), and Orvieto Scalo (2,186).

== Economy ==
The white wine of the Orvieto district, to the northeast of the city, is highly prized; red wines are also grown.

Orvieto is a member of Cittaslow, the slow food movement. Orvieto has many restaurants. One of Orvieto's specialty dishes is truffle pasta.

In the mid-19th century, Orvieto had manufactures of high-quality felt hats, common earthenware, tiles, bricks, and spirits. Production included staves, barrels, and potash, along with tanneries. Textiles of hemp, linen, and cotton were woven, and in the wool industry a particularly strong fabric known as pozzetto was produced.

In the 1940s, traditional industries included the manufacture of ceramics and the making of embroidery. Orvieto ware, tin-glazed earthenware (maiolica) was originally manufactured at Orvieto, where it has been produced since the 13th century.

The Italian bank Cassa di Risparmio di Orvieto was based in the city.

== Demographics ==
At the end of the 13th century, Orvieto is estimated to have had about 30,000 inhabitants.

At the time of unification in 1861, Orvieto was a town of 14,318 inhabitants. Over the following decades, growth gathered momentum, pushing the population past 18,000 by the turn of the century and continuing upward into the interwar years, when it surpassed 21,000 by 1936.

The post-war period marked Orvieto's demographic high tide. By 1951 the population had climbed to 24,422, reaching its peak of 25,088 in 1961.

From the 1970s onward, the population began to recede, gently but persistently: down to 23,220 in 1971 and just over 21,000 by 1991. By 2025, the population stood at 19,196.

== Transport ==
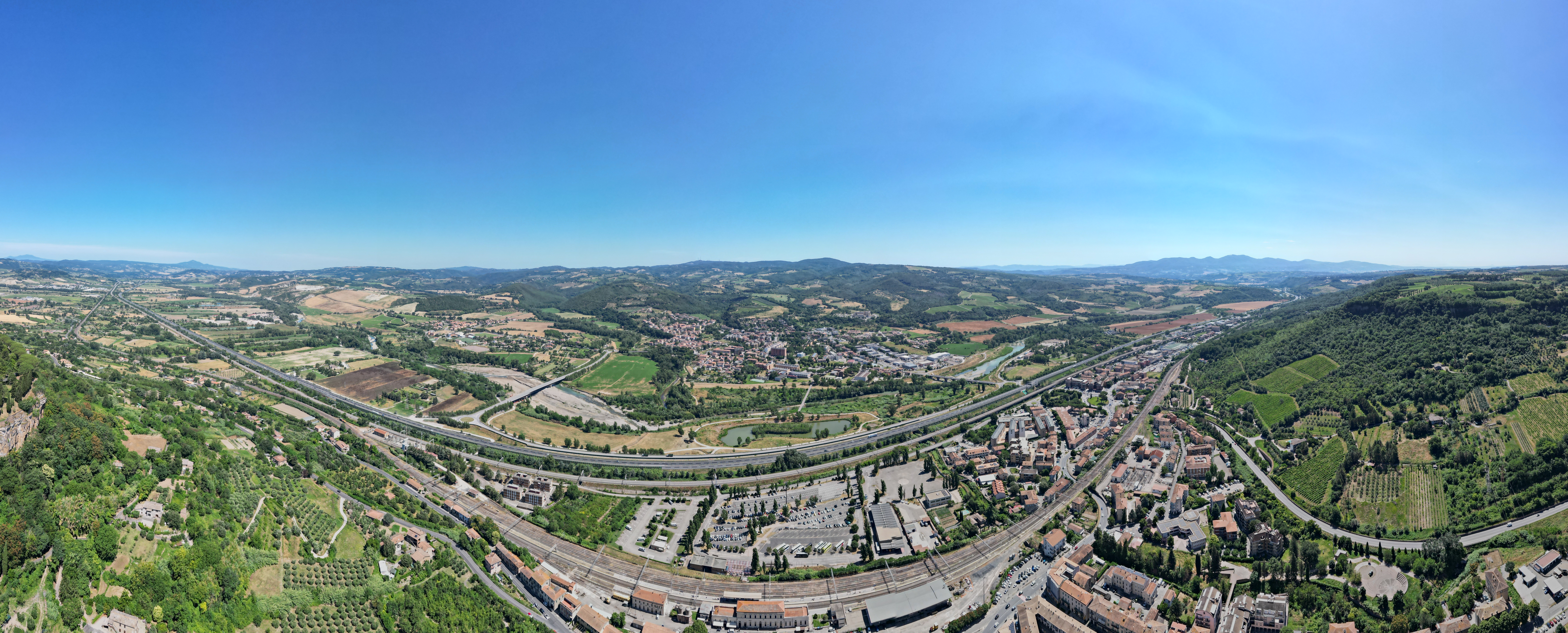
Orvieto train station, its funicular, and surrounds, June 2024

The Orvieto funicular provides a link from Orvieto to the historic city centre.

Since December 2016, Orvieto station has been served by Austrian railways ÖBB overnight sleeper services to Munich and Vienna.

== Religion ==
=== Cathedral ===
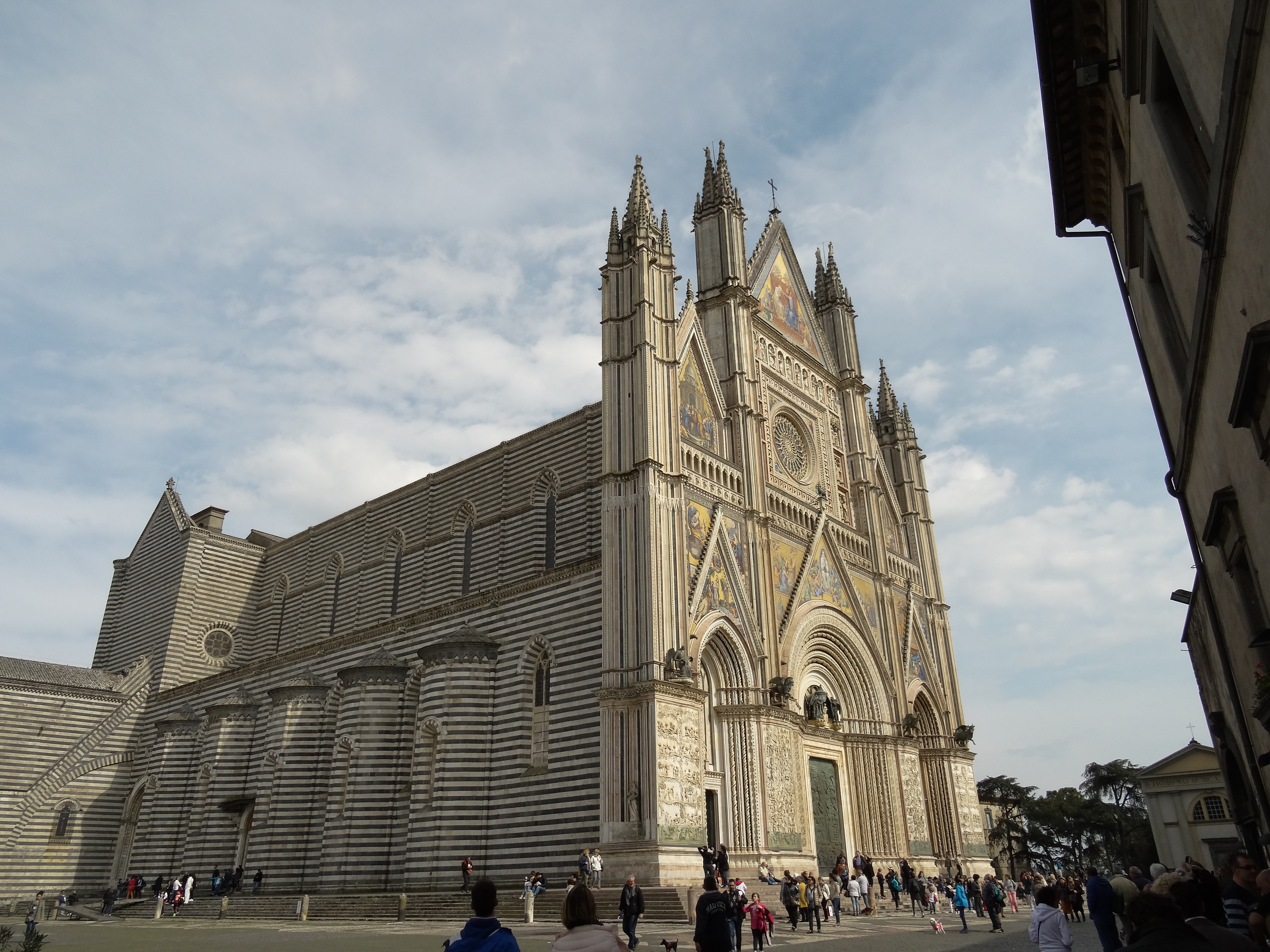
The monumental Cathedral of Orvieto

The cathedral is the principal monument of Orvieto and is regarded as a major work of Romanesque-Gothic architecture. Construction began on 14 November 1290, when Pope Nicholas IV laid the foundation stone. Although the author of the original design remains uncertain, the project has been attributed to Arnolfo di Cambio and to Fra Bevignate of Perugia. From 1310 the works were directed by Lorenzo Maitani, whose intervention shaped the structure decisively.

The cathedral has a basilical plan with ten chapels, lit by windows closed with alabaster slabs. Its façade is marked by high spires, mosaics with gold backgrounds, sculptural cycles on the pilasters, a rose window, and bronze portals. Inside, the bichrome marble emphasizes the wall masses and columns. The right transept is occupied by the Cappella Nuova or Chapel of San Brizio, whose walls and vaults were frescoed by Luca Signorelli on the theme of the Last Judgment, after Beato Angelico left the work unfinished. The apse area was decorated by Ugolino di Prete Ilario and Pietro di Puccio with frescoes of the Stories of the Virgin. The choir is decorated with carved woodwork and sculpture.

The left transept is occupied by the Chapel of the Corporal, which preserves the reliquary containing the Holy Linen associated with the Miracle of Bolsena.

On the wall beside the baptismal font is a fresco of the Madonna and Child painted by Gentile da Fabriano in 1425. One of the largest organs in Italy stands on the wall at the entrance to the Chapel of the Corporal.

=== San Giovenale ===
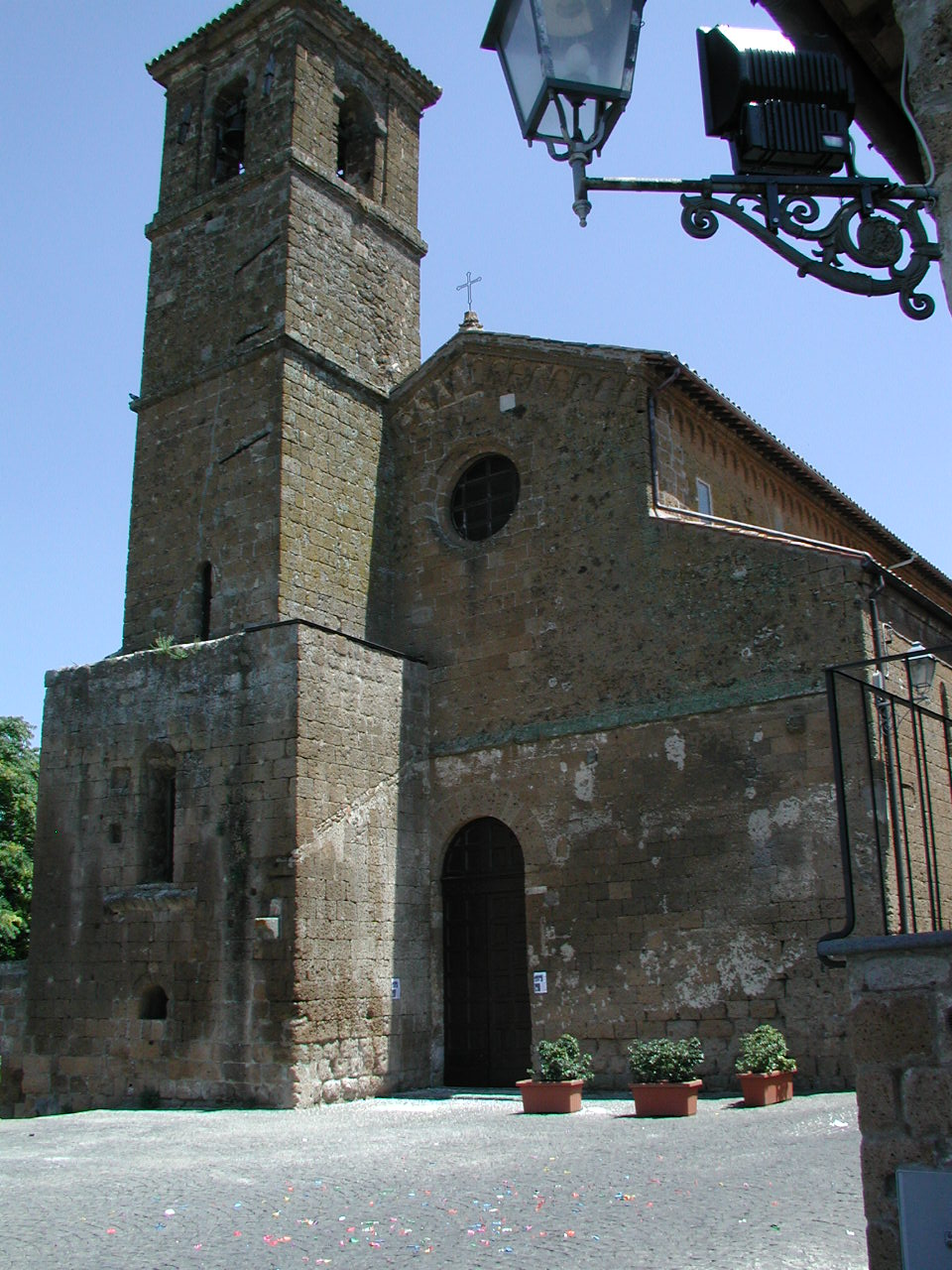
San Giovenale

The church of San Giovenale dates in its first construction to 1004 and was later renewed toward the end of the 13th century. It has three naves lit by twenty oblong windows; the central nave is supported by eight cylindrical columns with round arches. The side aisles were once covered with frescoes, some in Byzantine style, and 34 painted scenes remain from the 14th century. The central nave was painted in the 16th century with various scenes and a large frieze, later covered with whitewash.

The tempera panel of the high altar represents Mary with Jesus, Saint Severinus, and Saint Juvenal; in the lunette is Jesus between two angels, and in the predella scenes of Saint Juvenal and Saint Severinus, a work of the Umbrian school of the 14th century. The painting was transferred to the Pinacoteca of the Opera del Duomo. Beneath the altar, in a marble sarcophagus, appears the inscription "Guido Abbas Anno Domini 1170".

The church contains many 13th-century frescos.

=== Sant'Andrea e San Bartolomeo ===
The church of Sant'Andrea e San Bartolomeo has an unknown foundation and is built with three naves supported by eight granite columns. In 977 Pope Benedict VII had the mosaic pavement executed, traces of which remain before the high altar. The site is held to coincide with the ancient forum of Volsinii and the temple of Juno Herbana.

Around 1220 Pope Honorius III crowned Peter, Count of Artois, King of Jerusalem, in this church, and in memory of the event a bell tower was erected and the church decorated with paintings, now deteriorated. Near the high altar is the fresco of the Madonna delle Grazie of the Perugian school. Near the last pillar on the right is a desk decorated with a fresco of the Virgin with Jesus, Saint John, and Saint Paul from the 13th century. The pulpit is adorned with mosaics of the 10th century.

=== San Domenico ===
The church of San Domenico stands on the site of the temple of Minerva and began construction in 1233. In 1245 Cardinal Annibaldo Annibaldeschi added the convent and enlarged the church. From 1263 to 1264 Saint Thomas Aquinas resided there. In the 17th century both church and convent were rebuilt and reduced in size.

In the chapel of Saint Peter Martyr are frescoes of 1430 depicting Mary with Jesus, with Saint John and Saint Dominic on the left and Saint Peter and Saint Anthony on the right, works of the Umbrian school. On the right wall near the crossing stands the monument to Cardinal Guillaume de Bray, who died in 1290. The deceased is shown on a bed while attendants raise the curtains; the background is decorated with mosaics, and above in a niche is Mary with Jesus enthroned, flanked by Saint Dominic and Saint William, with the kneeling cardinal. Beneath is the funerary inscription ending with the words "Hoc opus fecit Arnolphus".

=== San Francesco ===
The church of San Francesco stands at the highest point of the city on the site of the ancient church of Santa Maria della Pulzella and was built in 1240. The main portal bears in its semicircular arch the emblem of John the Baptist in marble. The church was remodeled into its present three-nave form and entirely modernized in 1773.

In the earlier church there were four chapels bearing the coats of arms of the Monaldeschi family. In 1271 a solemn funeral was held there for Henry, cousin of Edward I, killed in Viterbo on 15 March of that year by Guy de Montfort. The adjoining convent, with cloister renewed in the 17th century after designs by Ippolito Scalza, contains a monument of the 15th century. The building later served as the seat of the military district.

=== San Lorenzo ===
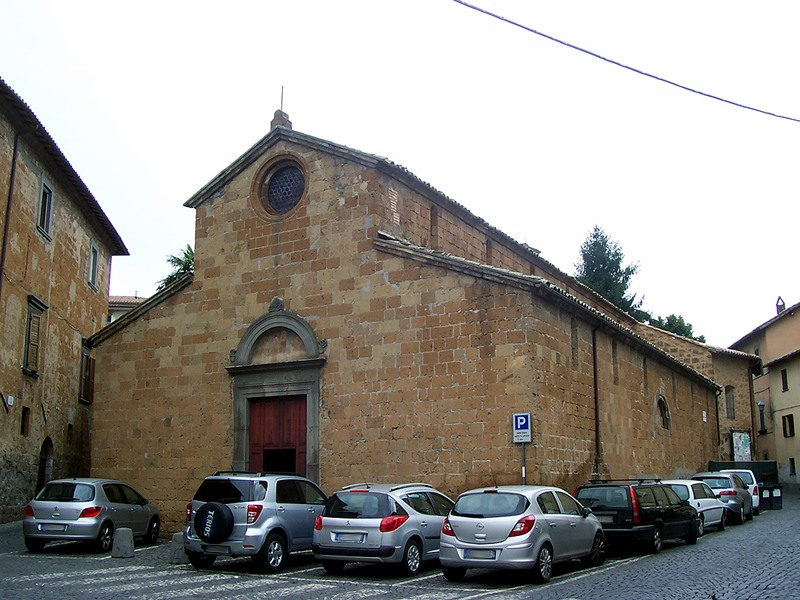
Church of San Lorenzo

The church of San Lorenzo dates from the end of the 13th century. In the lunette above the main portal is a fresco of the Virgin with Child and two saints of the school of Luca Signorelli. The interior has three naves with a semicircular apse. The walls were once entirely covered with frescoes, most now lost under whitewash. Remaining are figures including Saint Bridget and Saint Lawrence on the first column to the left, and Saint William Abbot on the second, works of the 14th century.

In the central nave are scenes of the condemnation and martyrdom of Saint Lawrence and two miracles of the saint recalling the manner of Giunta Pisano. In the apse is Christ enthroned flanked by Mary, Saint John, a monk saint, and Saint Lawrence. The ancient ciborium of black stone in Byzantine style survives only in part, with its tympanum preserved in the museum of the Opera del Duomo.

=== Other religious buildings ===
- San Lodovico: Baroque church
- San Bernardino: Baroque church associated with a Bernardine female convent
- San Lorenzo in Vineis

== Culture ==
=== Saint Patrick's Well ===
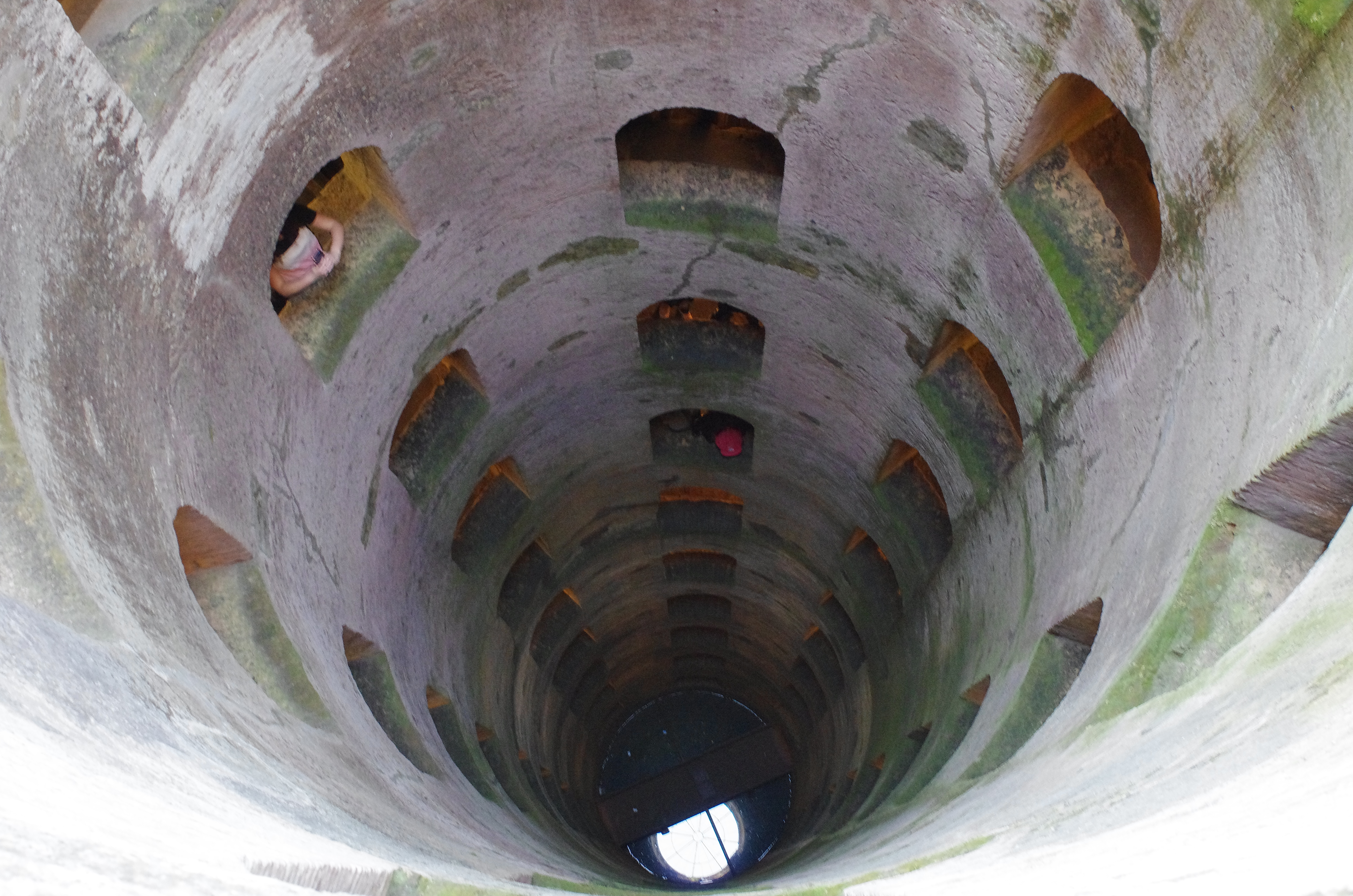
The Pozzo di San Patrizio, a well built for the popes

Saint Patrick's Well stands in Orvieto near gardens containing Etruscan remains. It was built in the 16th century to secure the town’s water supply in times of disaster or prolonged siege. Pope Clement VII commissioned the work after taking refuge in Orvieto during the Sack of Rome in 1527, assigning the project to Antonio da Sangallo the Younger. In his absence, the works were directed by Giovanni Battista da Cortona, while the decorative elements were by Simone Mosca. In 1532, at a depth of 200 feet, a pre-Etruscan tomb was also found. The excavation passed first through tuff and then clay, and once the water table had been reached the shaft was lined in brick. Work was completed in 1537, under Pope Paul III.

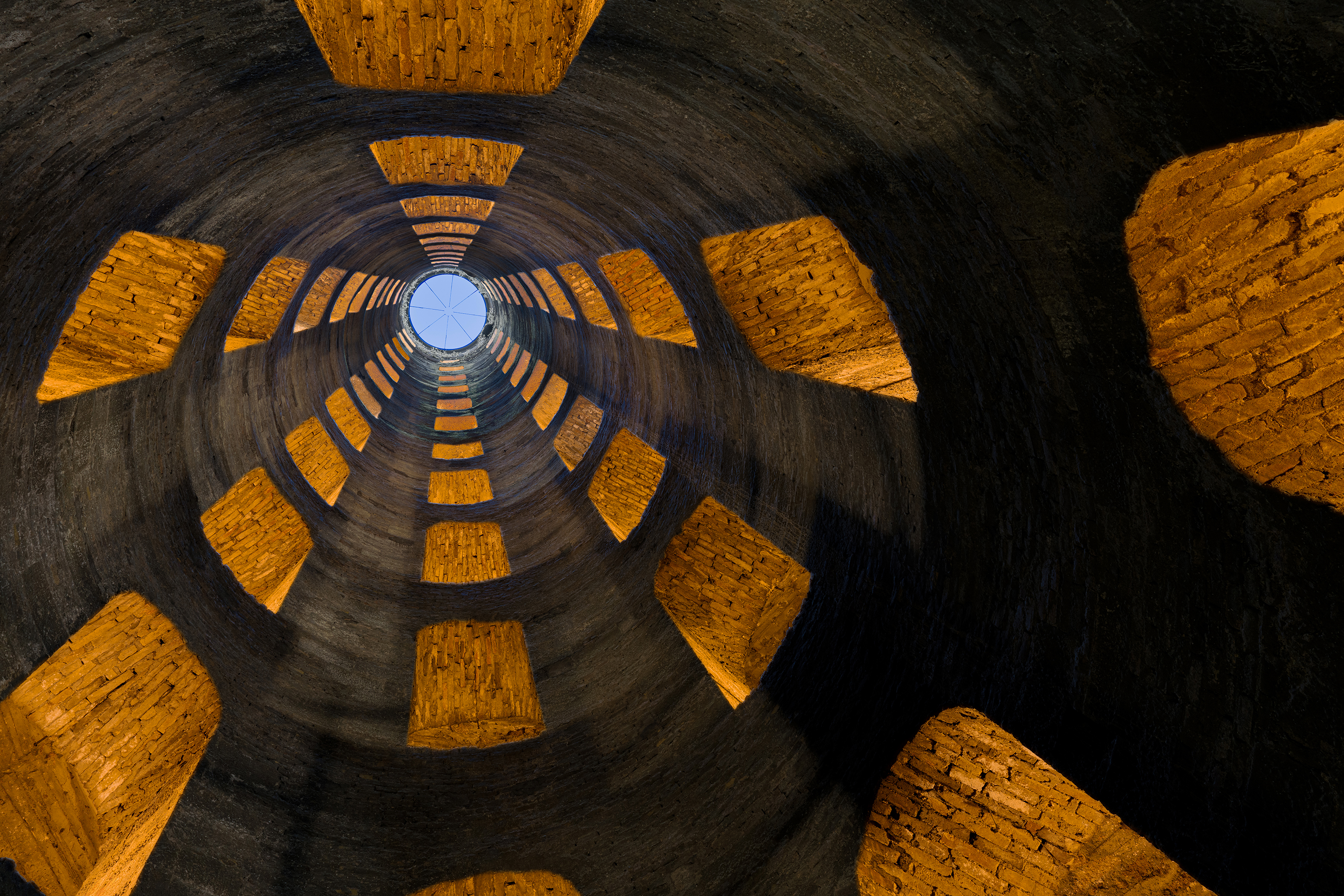
Saint Patrick's Well, view from the water level at the bottom

The well is circular, 62 metres (203 ft) deep and 13 metres (43 ft) wide. Around the shaft run two spiral staircases, designed one above the other without communicating, so that those descending with pack animals to draw water would not obstruct those returning to the surface. Each staircase has 248 steps and is lit by 72 arched windows opening into the shaft. At the bottom, a small bridge connects the two staircases. Outside, the well appears as a broad, low cylindrical structure decorated with the Farnese lilies of Paul III and pierced by two doors at opposite points. The water level at the bottom, fed by a natural spring, remains constant because an outlet drains off any excess.

Clement VII also commissioned Benvenuto Cellini to strike a medal, now kept in the Vatican Museums, bearing the words ut populus bibat and showing Moses striking water from the rock.

The name was linked to a deep cavity in Ireland associated in the past with Saint Patrick and with the idea of the afterlife. Because of its depth, the pope dedicated the well to Saint Patrick, and the expression "pozzo di San Patrizio" later came to indicate a mysterious and inexhaustible reserve of wealth.

=== Pozzo della Cava ===
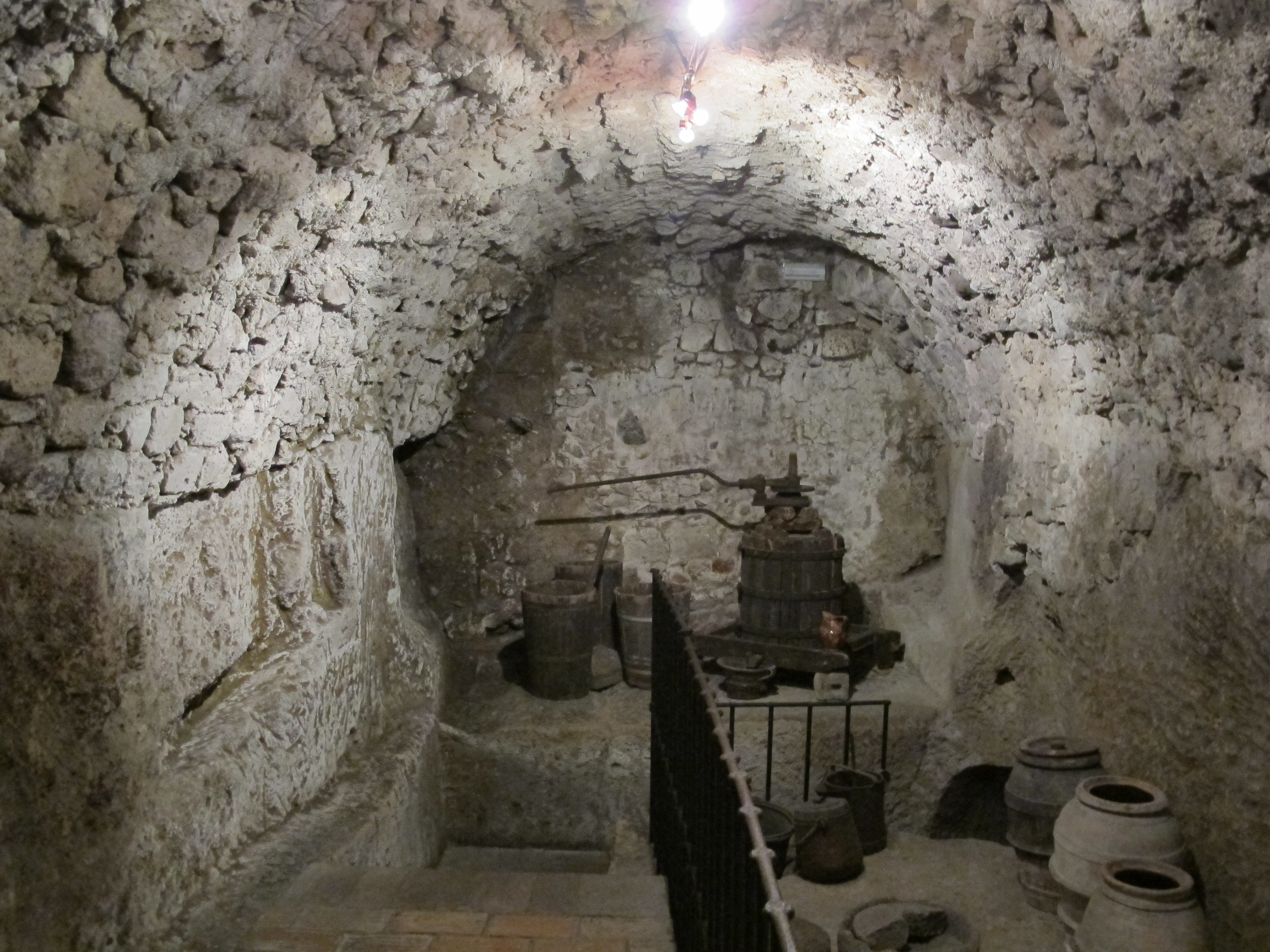
Pozzo della Cava

Pozzo della Cava is centered on a deep well from which the site takes its name. The well was excavated on the orders of Pope Clement VII, who had taken refuge in Orvieto in 1527 and wanted access to spring water in case of siege, reusing an earlier Etruscan shaft. Its structure consists of two connected parts: one circular in section and a smaller rectangular part dating to the 5th or 6th century BC.

The site also includes an Etruscan cistern, refuse pits, a medieval cellar, and remains of ancient rock-cut tombs. Some rooms were used in the Middle Ages and the Renaissance for ceramic production. During the Christmas season, a nativity scene is installed in the cavity of the well.

=== Torre del Moro ===
The Torre del Moro stands in the center of Orvieto along the main street. At the end of the 13th century, during a new phase of urban planning, the city placed the Palazzo dei Sette and the tower then known as the Tower of the Pope in a central strategic position. The tower is 47 metres (154 ft) high and is oriented almost perfectly to the four cardinal points. In the 16th century it took its present name from Raffaele di Sante, known as il Moro, who also gave his name to the Palazzo Gualtiero below and to the surrounding district.

In 1865, at a height of 18 metres (59 ft), the distribution tank of the new aqueduct was installed in the tower. Following restorations in 1866, a mechanical clock and two civic bells were added. The smaller bell came from the tower of Sant’Andrea and the larger from the Palazzo del Popolo.

The Palazzo dei Sette with the Torre del Moro belonged to the Della Terza family, later became papal property, served as the seat of the Seven and of the pontiff, and was also reportedly inhabited by Antonio da Sangallo. It has been restored and adapted as a cultural center.

=== Palazzo Comunale ===
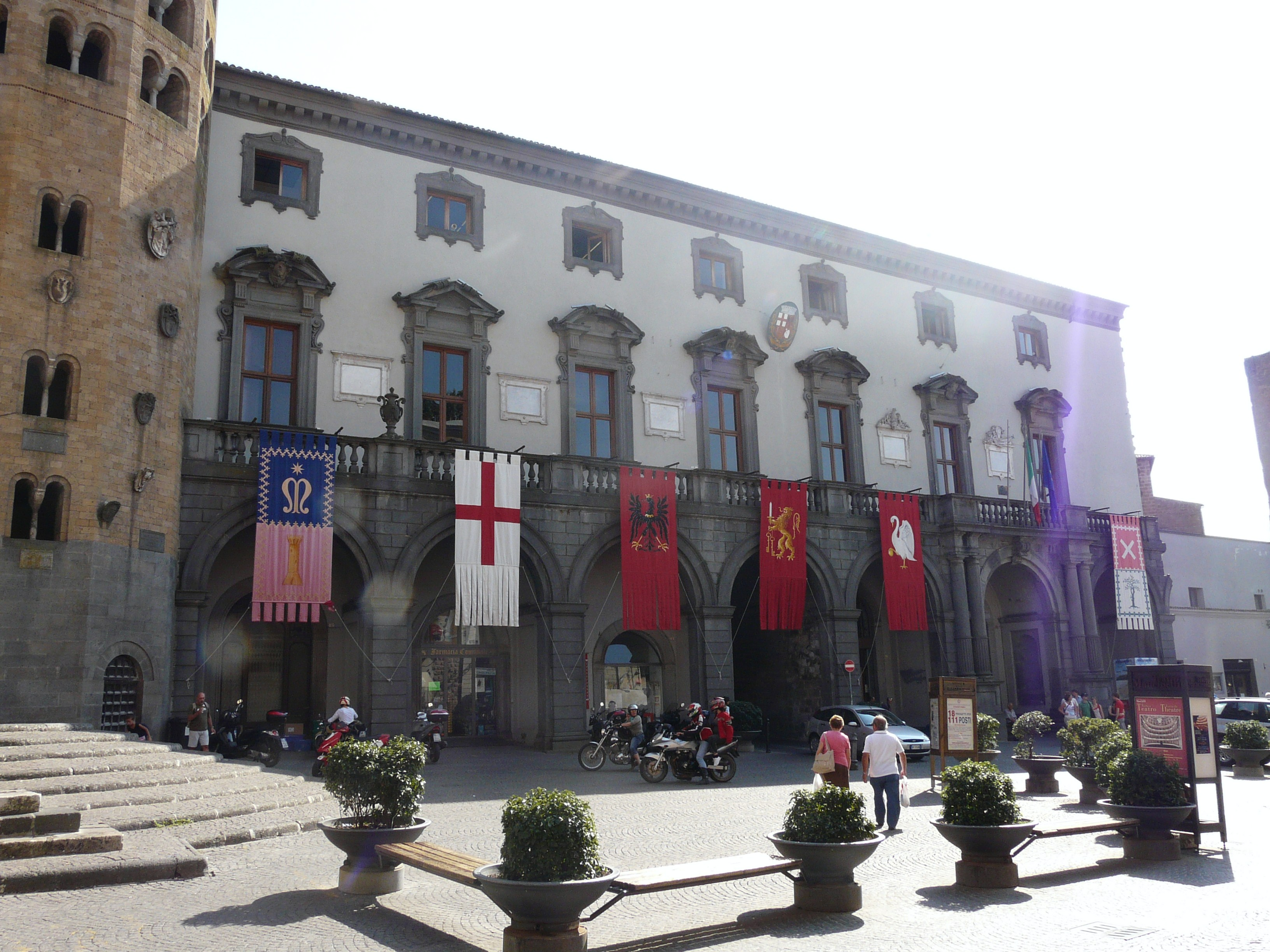
Palazzo Comunale

The Palazzo Comunale, located in Piazza della Repubblica, underwent works around the mid-16th century when the public council decreed that its façade be reformed to face the main square. Clement VII granted 100 gold ducats in 1524 for this construction. The design was by Scalza, who also directed the works, although the building remained unfinished.

The façade includes a grand portal framed by paired columns with Doric capitals, and the windows are adorned with frames and carvings in black basalt. In the secretariat there is a detached fresco depicting Saint Sebastian with an angel and archers, by Girolamo Genga and later attributed to Perugino. In the chapel is a tempera panel with the Virgin Mary, Saint John, and the Crucifix, of Giottesque school. A small Roman cinerary urn with festoons in bas-relief was adapted as a holy water stoup.

In the first entrance hall are preserved, among other inscriptions, two notable plaques dated 1209 and 1220 containing statutory laws of the municipality. On the first floor is the secret municipal archive, and on the second the urban notarial archive. In the hall of the retainers is a Roman funerary urn depicting in high relief a wedding feast composed of ten figures.

=== Palazzo del Capitano del Popolo ===
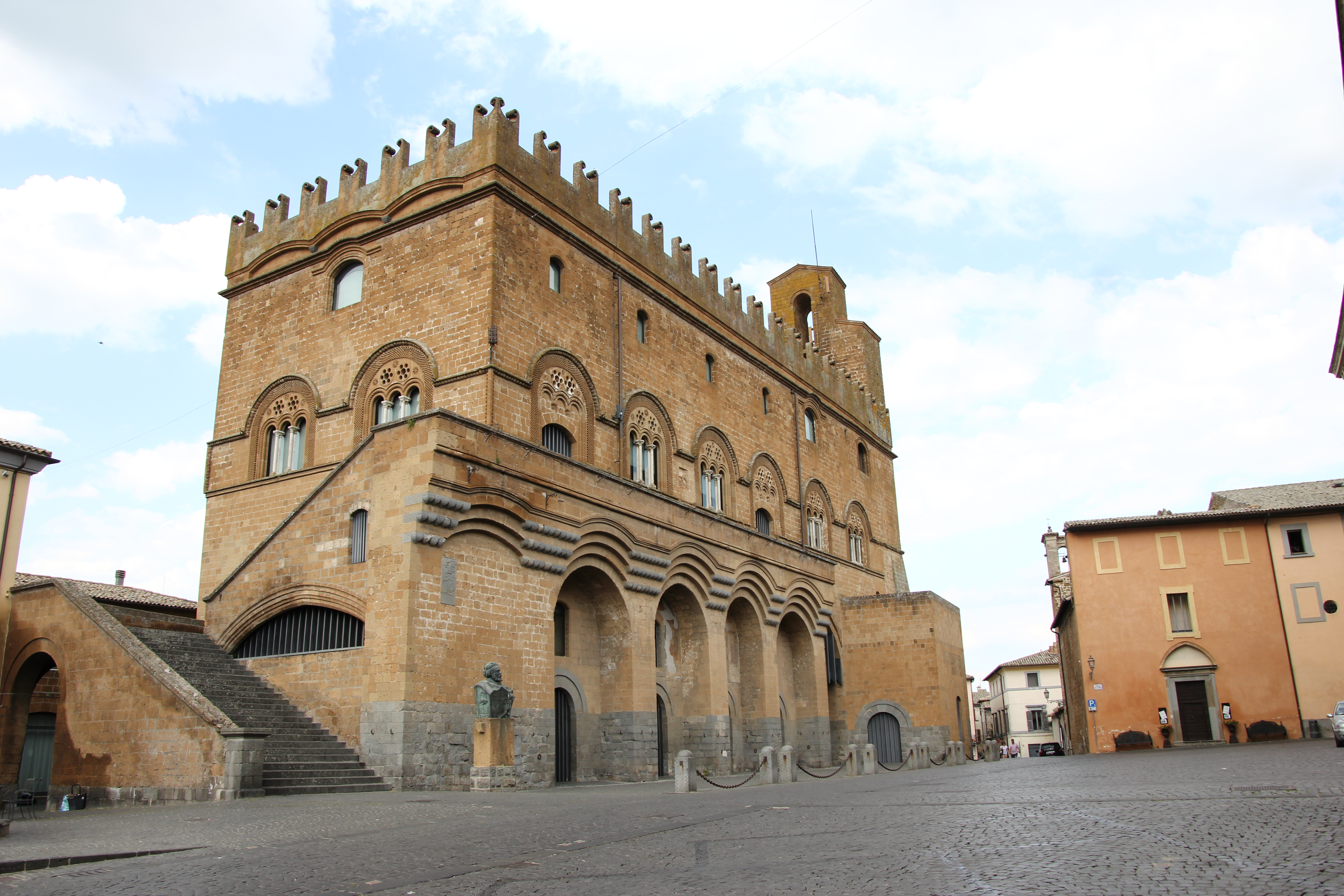
Palazzo del Capitano del Popolo

The Palazzo del Capitano del Popolo is among the most notable buildings of the city. Its north façade is fairly well preserved, while the south façade has been altered at various times. Its architectural ensemble and decorative techniques indicate a construction dating to the 12th century, although archival records only reach back to the end of the 13th century, either for its construction or enlargement.

In the adjoining tower is a bell cast at the expense of the Masters of the Arts, bearing the emblems of the guilds. This bell was later placed in 1876 in the new clock on the tower of the Tribunal in Via del Corso. The interior hall was once decorated with coats of arms painted in fresco, some of which remain visible. On the wall opposite the entrance is a fresco of Jesus crucified dating to the 15th century.

=== Palazzo di San Bernardino ===
Palazzo di San Bernardino was commissioned by Lodovico, count Di Marsciano, to Antonio da Sangallo. It is a major example of Renaissance architecture in Orvieto. Its façade is imposing and elegant, divided into three levels. The entrance portal is rusticated up to the level of the loggia, in whose entablature appears the family coat of arms of the Di Marsciano. The frieze of the windows bears the name of the owner. The prominent cornice is decorated with triglyphs and metopes.

=== Teatro Comunale ===
The Teatro Comunale stands in Via del Corso on the site formerly occupied by Palazzo Orienti. It was designed by Count Virginio Vespignani. The façade is divided by two orders of porticoes. The decorations of the entrance hall were painted by Annibale Angelini.

The ceiling of the auditorium is richly adorned with refined ornamentation, including representations of the Hours as flying figures painted by Cesare Fracassini of Orvieto. Along the entablature of the proscenium Fracassini depicted the three figures of Melpomene, Euterpe, and Thalia. The hall is decorated with elaborate carvings and gilding.

Of the two stage curtains, one was painted by Fracassini and depicts the expulsion of the Goths from Orvieto in the year 538; the other was painted by Angelini and represents architectural decorations, with figures by Fracassini. The reception rooms are also richly decorated and contain paintings by the same artist. The theatre was completed in the spring of 1866.

=== Museo Claudio Faina ===
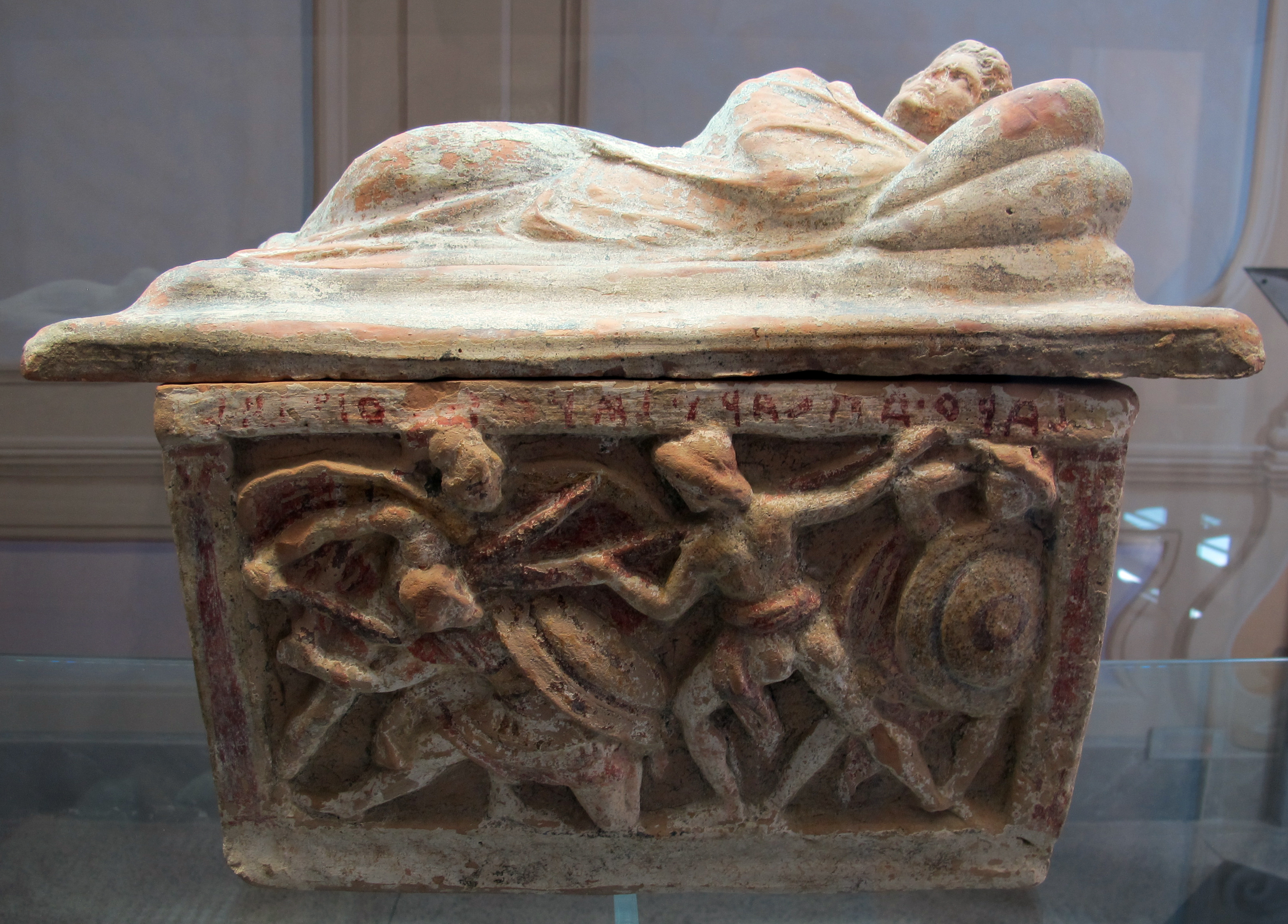
Cinerary urn dated to around 150–100 BC, showing the myth of Echetlus

The Museo Claudio Faina and the Civic Museum are housed in Palazzo Faina in Piazza del Duomo.

The Civic Museum, on the ground floor, is dedicated to finds from excavations in the city and the territory of Orvieto and documents the flourishing of Volsinii, Etruscan Orvieto. Among the materials displayed are the architectural terracottas from the Belvedere Temple, which formed the decorative and facing system of sacred buildings and were directly inspired by classical Greek art. From the sacred area of Cannicella, a sanctuary complex within the necropolis south of the city, comes the well-known statuette of Venus, while from the Crocifisso del Tufo necropolis come stone markers for tombs, generally bearing the name of the deceased. Material from the Orvieto territory collected in the course of the 19th century is also displayed, including the sarcophagus of Torre San Severo, with carved scenes derived from Greek mythology and linked to funerary themes.

On the piano nobile, which preserves its 19th-century decoration, are displayed the finds recovered or acquired by the Faina family, with particular attention to Mauro's collecting activity, especially the numismatic collection, composed in large majority of Roman coins of the Republican and Imperial periods and arranged in chronological sequence. On the second floor the finds are ordered according to typological and chronological criteria, from pre-protohistoric materials to Attic pottery, and some rooms are entirely devoted to Etruscan ceramics.

=== National Archaeological Museum ===
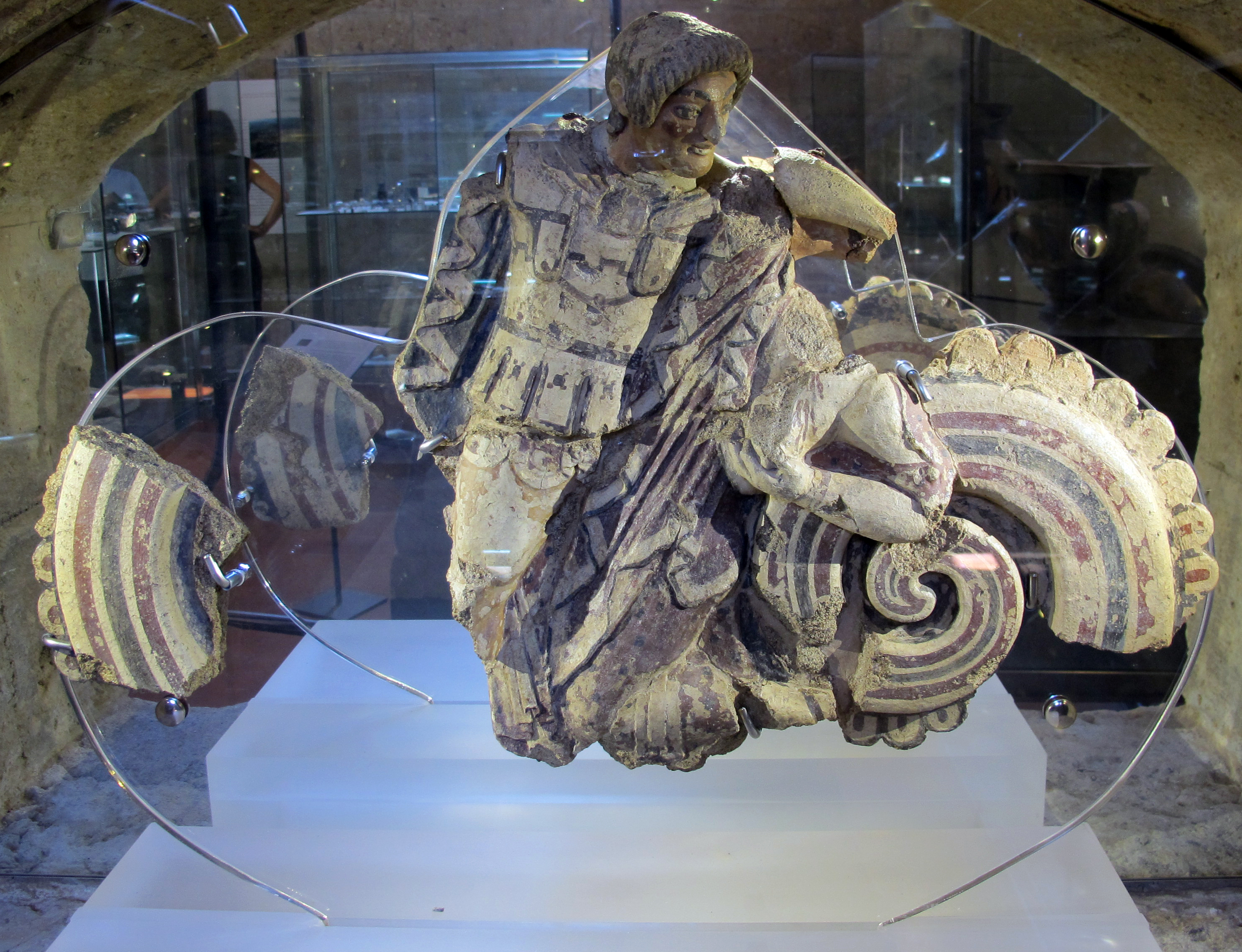
Terracotta acroterion depicting the matricide of Orestes (ca. 500–480 BC), preserved in the museum

The National Archaeological Museum of Orvieto is housed on the ground floor of the medieval Palazzo Martino IV, one of the three papal palaces behind the cathedral. Opened in 1982, it brings together materials discovered in the city and surrounding territory, including finds formerly kept in the archaeological section of the Museo dell'Opera del Duomo. The collection also includes the wall paintings from the Golini tombs at Porano, formerly kept in the Archaeological Museum of Florence, as well as material from the urban necropolises of Crocifisso del Tufo and Cannicella, the temples of Belvedere and via San Leonardo, and the necropolises of Porano, Castellonchio, and neighboring localities. The finds are arranged topographically, and material from recent or ongoing excavations is exhibited on a rotating basis.

=== Museo Emilio Greco ===
The Museo Emilio Greco is housed in Palazzo Soliano, on Piazza del Duomo to the right of the cathedral. Palazzo Soliano, built at the initiative of Pope Boniface VIII Caetani, is the largest and most imposing of the papal residences in Orvieto. It was formerly the historic seat of the Museo dell’Opera del Duomo.

The collection is linked to Emilio Greco's work for the cathedral, whose medieval portals have contained his bronze doors since 1970; these were made between 1962 and 1964. The works exhibited in Palazzo Soliano date from 1947 to 1990 and trace major stages in the career of the Sicilian artist, from the Lottatore, shown in London for the 1948 Olympics, to the plaster cast of the Monument to Pope John XXIII, produced between 1965 and 1967.

=== Ceramics ===
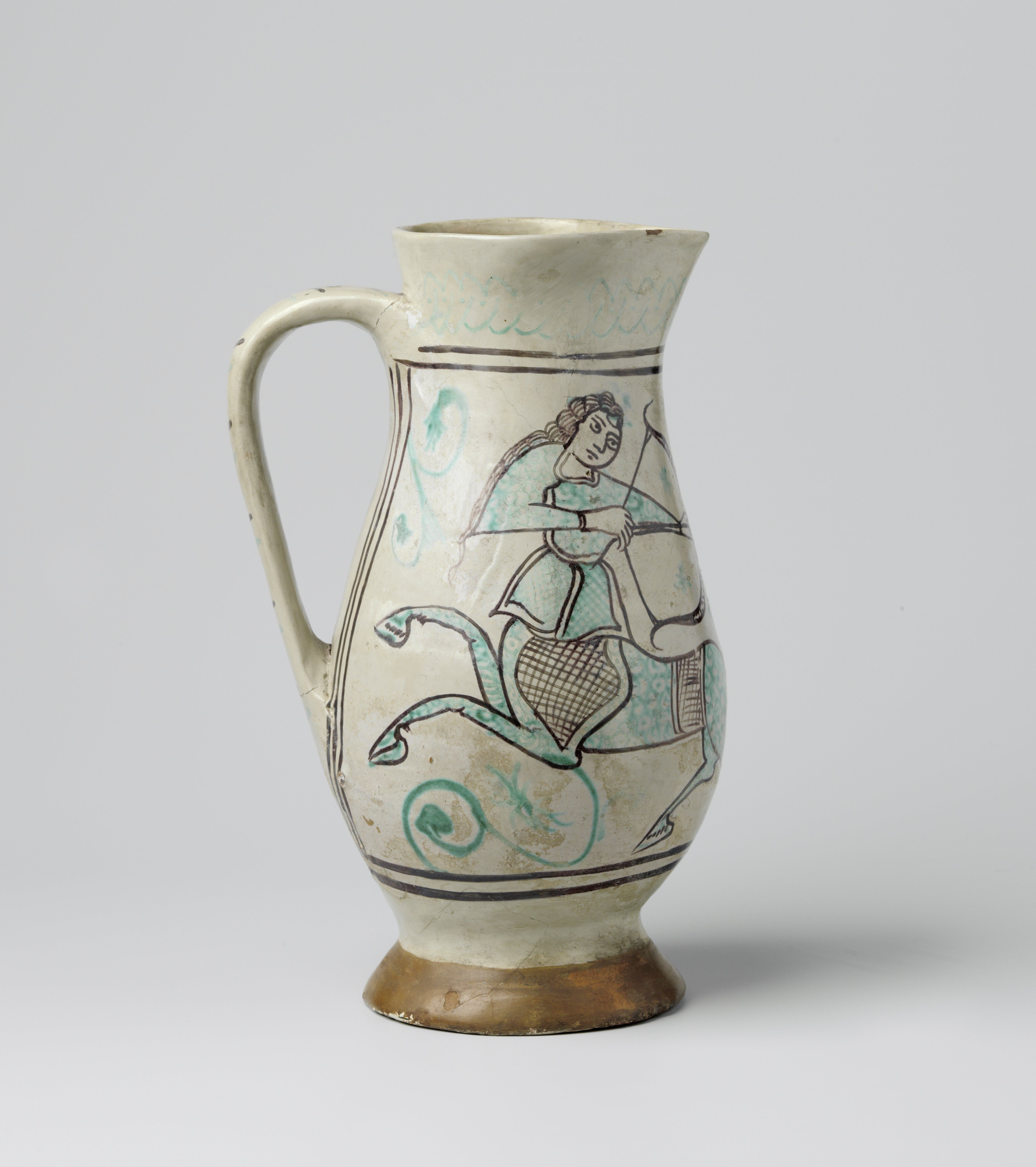
Maiolica jug, produced in Orvieto around 1400

Ceramics have a long tradition in Orvieto, beginning with the earliest human settlements. In the Etruscan period production included bucchero, made from highly refined clays, wheel-thrown, and uniformly black because it was fired in charcoal without oxygen. In the Middle Ages Orvietan archaic maiolica became a model for other Italian production centers. Its period of greatest development was between the late 13th century and the mid-14th century, with brown and green decoration on white glaze, net-pattern backgrounds, and forms decorated with birds, fish, animals, human figures, and beasts with human heads.

In the 15th century the vascellari, the master artisans, introduced new colors such as yellow and cobalt blue and new decorative techniques including scratched slipware and relief blue decoration known as zaffera. Production sites connected with this tradition remain visible near Pozzo della Cava, where there is a 15th-century kiln and a nearby workshop that remained active until the mid-16th century.

The rediscovery of archaic maiolica through medieval finds recovered from refuse pits of palaces and houses encouraged the reworking of ancient forms and decorations for modern local craft production. Between the two world wars this led to the production of the well-known jugs with a broad projecting spout known as galletto. The mosaic tesserae of the façade of the medieval Duomo of Orvieto were also of local production and contributed to the wider recognition of what became known as the Orvieto style.

=== Orvieto lace ===
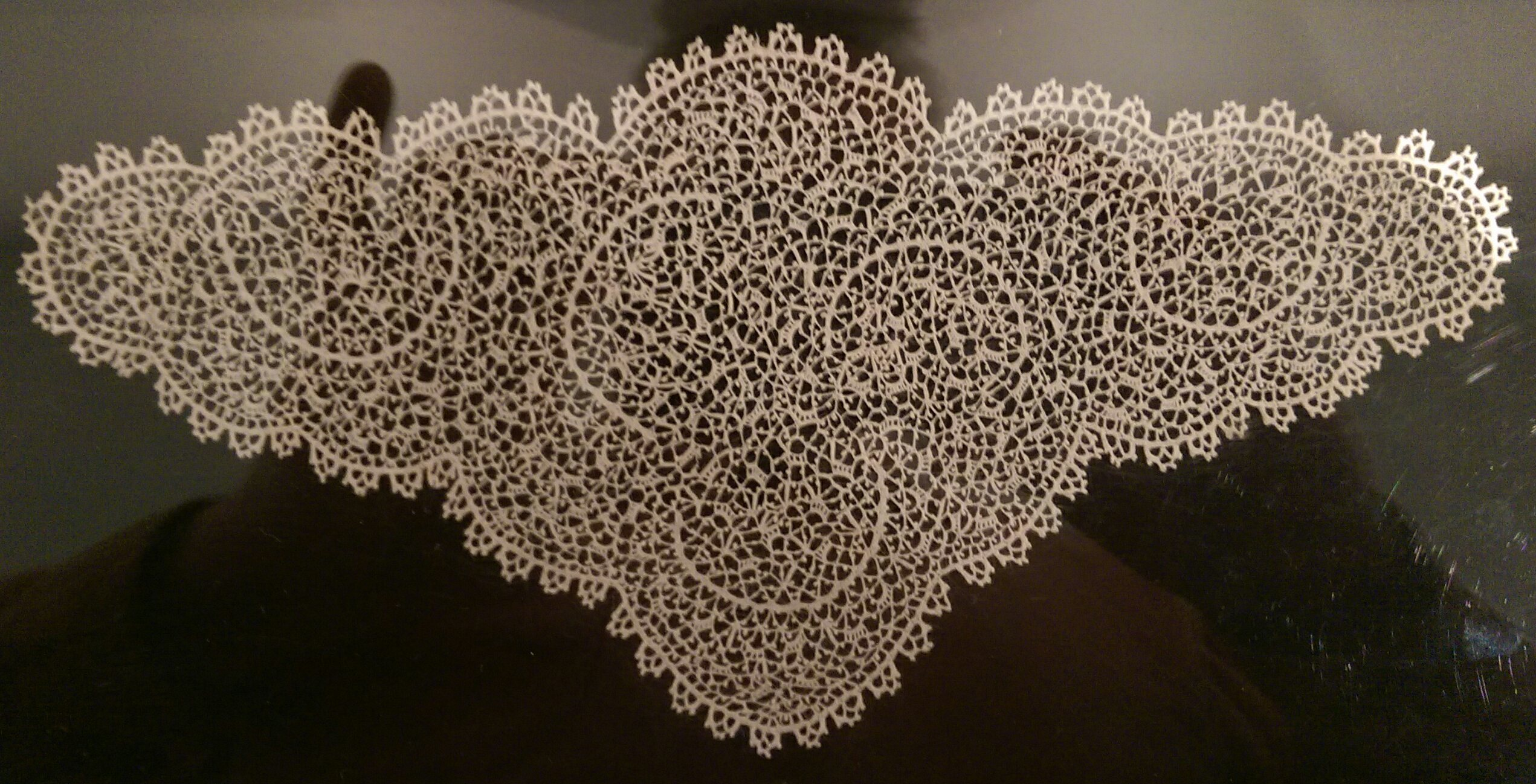
19th century cotton crochet from Orvieto

Lace-making in Orvieto developed from an initiative launched by Count Eugenio Faina. The lace is distinctive both in its technique and in its designs, which produced items such as centerpieces and inlays for clothing and household linen.

The process involves several stages that may be carried out by different specialized workers. Its essential tools are a very fine crochet hook and cotton thread. A design is first drawn on paper and transferred to a closely woven cloth; the decorative elements are then executed from the design and sewn onto the cloth. The final stage is the ground that joins all the parts together, including the central roundels, the mesh, and the small finishing details. A characteristic starched ironing process, carried out with heated iron tools resembling rounded awls, produces the raised effect that distinguishes Orvieto lace.

=== Other secular buildings ===
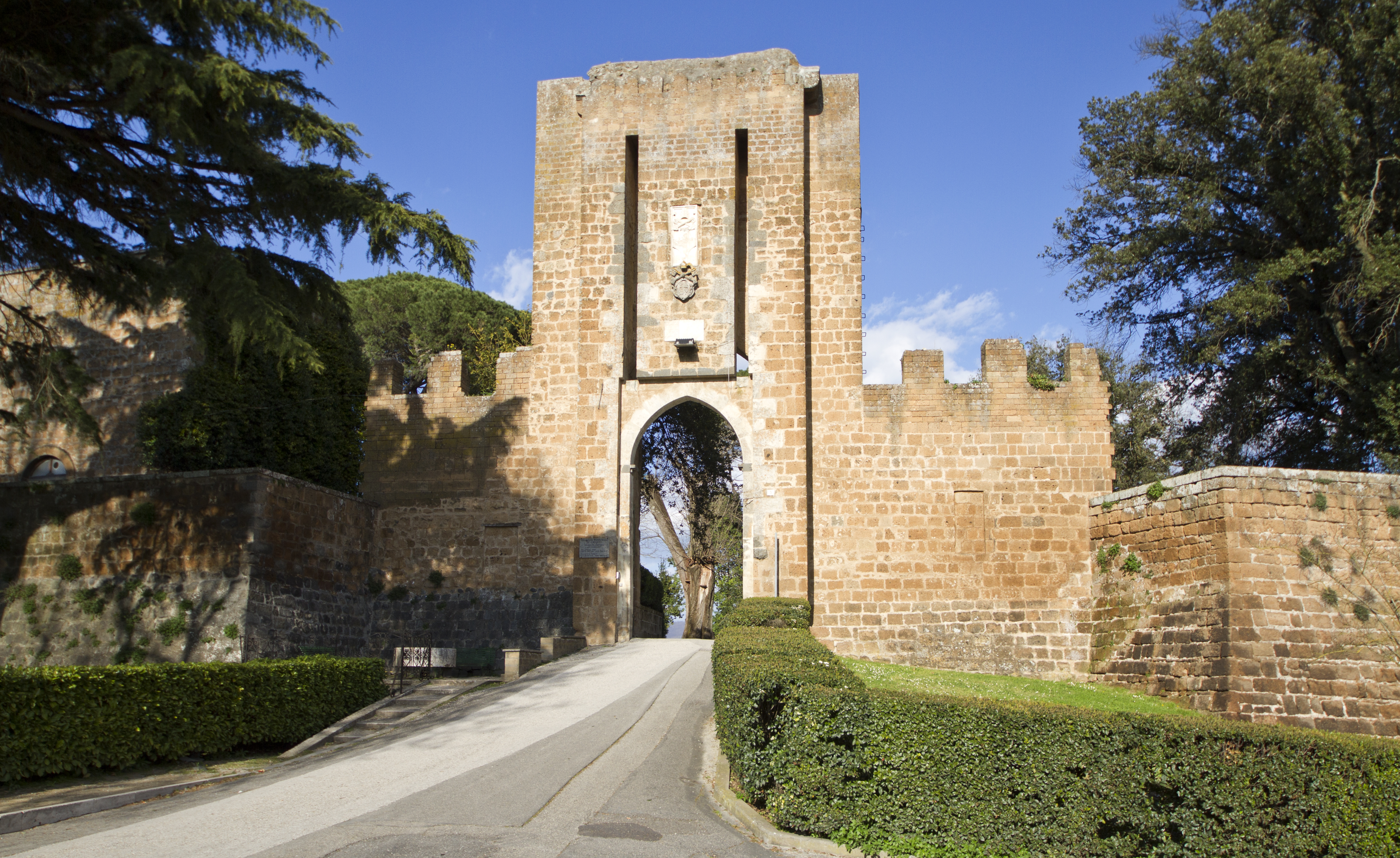
The gateway of Rocca di San Martino, part of the remaining stone fortifications

The Rocca di San Martino stands in an elevated and picturesque position and began to be built in 1360 by order of the cardinal legate Gil Albornoz at the expense of the municipality. It took the name of San Martino from the nearby church, which, together with other notable buildings, was demolished at that time. In 1395 it was destroyed by the Beffati. Reconstruction was completed under Urban VIII. In 1831 it was largely destroyed, the area was converted into a public garden, and the moats were filled in.

== Archeology ==
=== Belvedere Temple ===
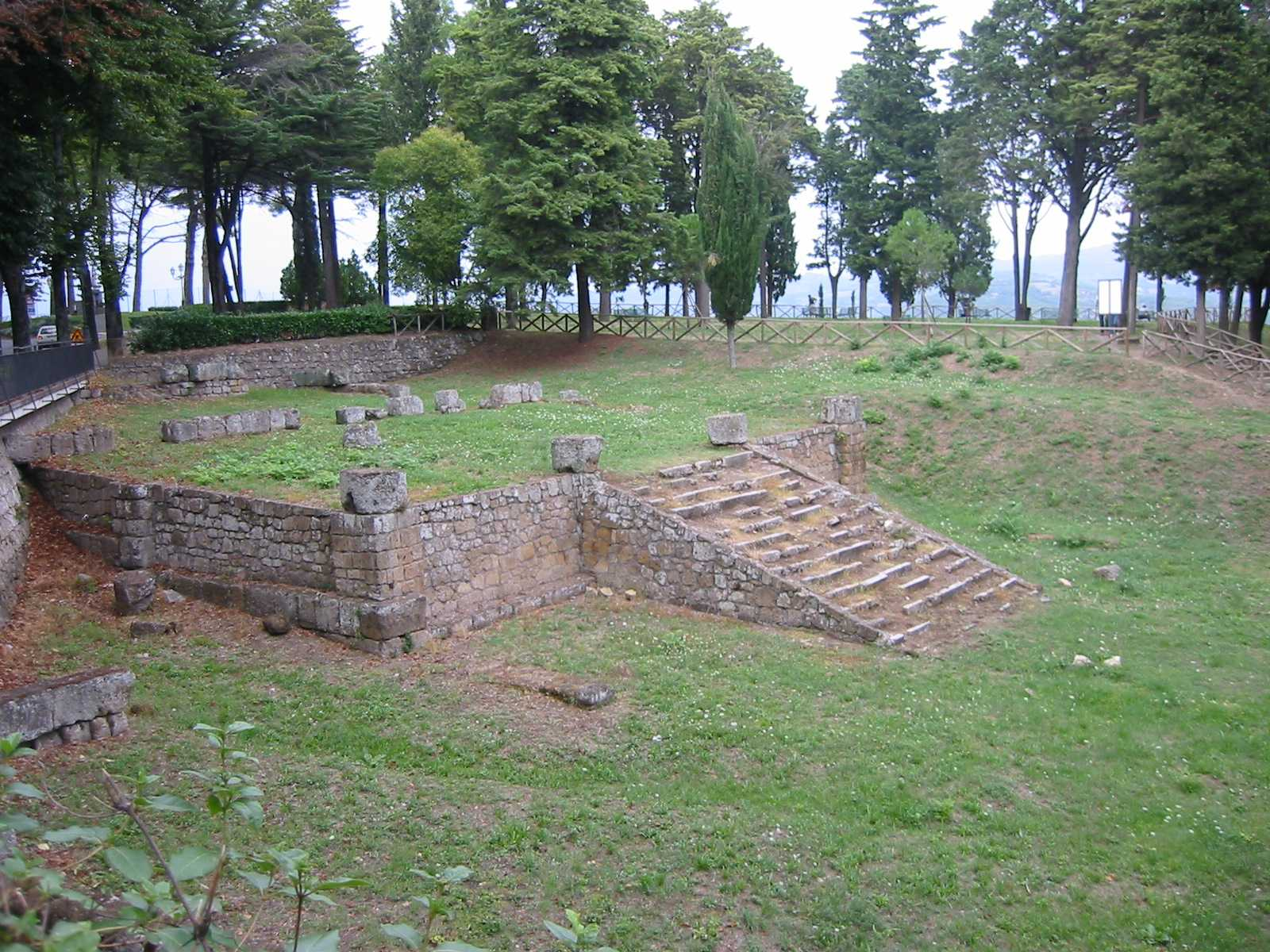
Tempio Del Belvedere

The Belvedere Temple, of Etruscan date, stands at the northern edge of the city on a panoramic terrace. Between the 6th and 5th centuries BC it was probably a cult building connected with the underworld, as indicated by explored structures and a black-glaze vase bearing a painted dedication to Tinia Calusna, a form of Jupiter with chthonic aspects.

It is the best-preserved monument of Etruscan Orvieto. The temple was discovered in 1828 during works for the construction of the Via Cassia Nuova. Surviving remains include the walls and foundation cuts, which show a plan with a pronaos at the front with four columns, behind which opened a space divided into three adjoining cellae, the central one larger than the lateral ones. The temple, oriented to the southeast, stands on a high rectangular podium measuring 21.9 metres (72 ft) in length, with a front width of 16.3 metres (53 ft) and a rear width of 16.9 metres (55 ft). Access was by way of a ramp placed centrally in relation to the area before the entrance, framed by a quadrangular enclosure.

A chamber cut into the tuff behind the temple and lined in cocciopesto, with benches along three walls, together with other structural remains and a cistern brought to light by more recent investigations, is linked to the cult practiced in the sacred area. The temple belongs to the Etrusco-Italic type. Excavations recovered a large group of architectural terracottas from at least two building phases. To the earlier phase, dated between the second half of the 6th century and the beginning of the 5th century BC, belong a few fragments and some molds. The later phase, dating to the late 5th century BC, is better documented and includes many fragments from the high-relief decoration of the rear pediment, showing a multi-figure scene with stylistic affinities to the art of Magna Graecia and especially to works of Phidias. Only a few terracotta fragments belong to a later phase of replacement of deteriorated elements.

The architectural terracottas from the temple are exhibited in the Museo Claudio Faina and the National Archaeological Museum of Orvieto.

=== Necropolis of Crocifisso del Tufo ===
The Necropolis of Crocifisso del Tufo extends along the northern slope of the tuff cliff on which Orvieto, the Etruscan Velzna, stands. Discovered in the 19th century, it is an archaeological site documenting Etruscan history and culture. The necropolis was used from the 8th to the 3rd century BC. During its period of greatest development, in the 6th and 5th centuries BC, it was laid out in blocks defined by orthogonal streets and occupied by cube-shaped tombs arranged according to a rigid plan reflecting an egalitarian social organization. Each burial was reserved for individual families identified by names inscribed on the architrave; these inscriptions also indicate the presence of foreign residents at Orvieto. Grave goods included luxury objects acquired on the Greek-Eastern market.

=== Other archeological heritage ===
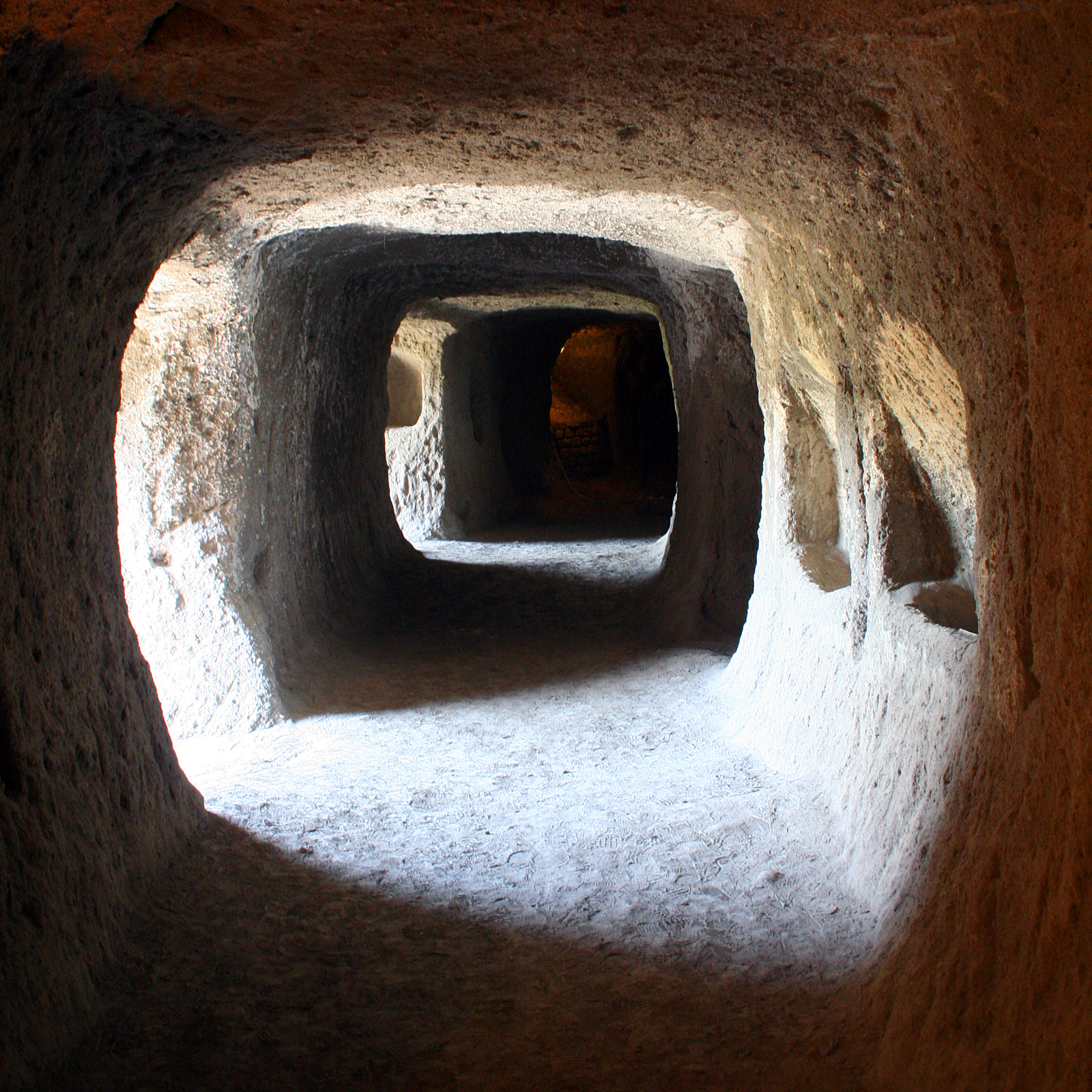
The underground tunneling system

Also in the area is the Golini Tomb, which was constructed in the fourth century BC. Its wall paintings depict a funeral banquet, giving some insight into the real-life gatherings held after the deaths of aristocratic Etruscans. The pictures include scenes of servants preparing for the feast in various ways.

Saint Anselm College has set up a program where each summer, students travel to Italy to work at the college's archaeology site located at the Coriglia excavation site, just outside town.

== Education ==
Alongside Saint Anselm College, Orvieto also hosts a study abroad program with the University of Arizona founded by archaeologist David Soren.

== Notable people ==
Notable figures in the sciences include Federico di Ottone Monaldeschi dell'Aquila, judge in the Capitoline court and prelate of the Segnatura; Pietro Paolo Febei, judge in the Capitoline court and podestà of Ferrara; Ermanno Monaldeschi, podestà of Florence and governor of Romagna (1288); Alessandro Monaldeschi, scholar and Capitoline official; Gezio Orvietano, jurist sent to Wenceslaus, king of Bohemia, to reform the kingdom's laws; Pietro d'Ancarano, canonist and civil law lecturer at Bologna, consultant to the Republic of Venice; and Girolamo Magoni, jurist and podestà of Florence and Lucca, author of Decisiones Lucenses et Florentinae.

Flaminio and Carlo Cartari were jurists and writers. Lodovico di Bonconte Monaldeschi, who died in 1442, wrote the Chronicle of the Monaldeschi. Monaldo Monaldeschi, canon of Saint Peter's Basilica, authored the Historical Commentaries of the City of Orvieto (1584). In modern scholarship and culture, Renato Bonelli, architectural historian; and Luigi Barzini, journalist and war correspondent, are among the most prominent.

Filippo Antonio Gualterio served as Minister of the Interior in the Menabrea Cabinet and later as Minister of the Royal Household.

Luigi Fumi was a historian who published the Codice diplomatico della città di Orvieto and numerous works on local history.

In military history, Alessandro Monte Marte, count of Titignano, took part in the siege of Mytilene. Butillo da Orvieto was castellan of Benevento and a captain in the wars between Alfonso of Aragon and Joanna. Gentile della Vipera della Sala Monaldeschi served under Francesco Sforza. Ugolino, count of Monte Marte, was lieutenant of Gil Albornoz and general of the Church's army. Vespasiano Marabottini, colonel under Pope Pius V, later served Henry III of France. Alberico Alberici and Jacopo, count of Corbara, distinguished themselves at the battle of Lepanto (1571).

Among artists were the architects Lorenzo Maitani, architect of Orvieto Cathedral; Angelo da Orvieto; Antonio, architect of San Francesco in Terni (1445); Stefano di Angelo; Placido di Oddone; Ippolito and Francesco Scalza; and Ascanio Vitozzi, architect and military engineer in the service of Charles Emmanuel I.

In sculpture, Tonino di Antonio, Meo di Andrea, Antonio Fazi, and Ippolito Scalza are noted. Among painters are Ugolino di Prete Ilario; Fra Giovanni; Luca Leonardelli; Pietro di Puccio; Frate Francesco; Nicola Petrucci; Girolamo and Cesare Nebbia; and Cesare Sermei.

In music and the arts, Erminia Frezzolini, a leading 19th-century opera soprano, and Luigi Mancinelli, composer and conductor, are notable.

In religion and public life, Teodorico Ranieri, cardinal and bishop; Girolamo Simoncelli, cardinal of the Roman Church; and Bonaventura Cerretti, cardinal and papal diplomat, were prominent figures.

The House of Farnese originated in Orvieto.

== Twin towns – sister cities ==
Orvieto is twinned with:

- (Palestine) Bethlehem
- Givors, France
- Maebashi, Japan
- Aiken, United States
- Seinäjoki, Finland
- Kercem, Malta
