= Palazzo Clementini =

Coordinates: 42.71775°N 12.11038°E

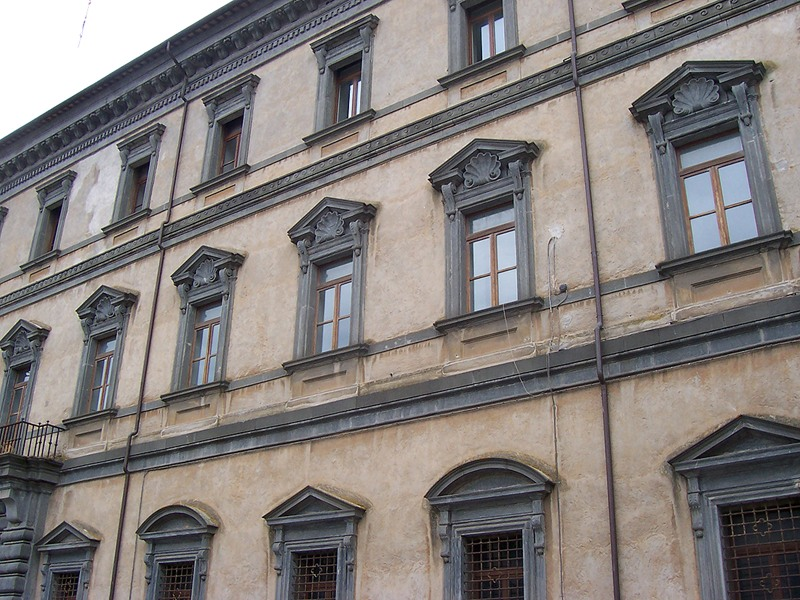
Portion of facade of Palazzo Clementini

Palazzo Clementini is a Renaissance architecture, aristocratic palace located on Piazza Ippolito Scalza in the historic center of Orvieto in the Region of Umbria, Italy. To the left (north) of the palace is the church of San Giuseppe e Giacomo. The building houses the Liceo Classico Filippo Antonio Gualterio (established in 1863). This palazzo, also known as Palazzo Cornello or Cornelio, rises one block west of the southern facade of Palazzo Gualterio.

The original palace was commissioned by the aristocrat Cornelio Clementini, who employed the architect Ippolito Scalza to design the palace. The facade however remained unfinished until the 20th century. Francesco Clementini in 1687 in his will apportioned funds to complete the facade and palace, demanding the arches of the palace display the coat of arms of his family.

The Commune bought the palace in 1912. The facade was completed in 1937 by Gustavo Giovannoni. It is likely the balcony was not included in the plans by Scalza. The palace housed the Biblioteca Comunale Luigi Fumi, until 2009 (now moved to the former convent attached to the church of San Francesco).
