= Palazzo Crispo Marsciano =

Palace in Umbria, Italy

Coordinates: 42.71706°N 12.11542°E

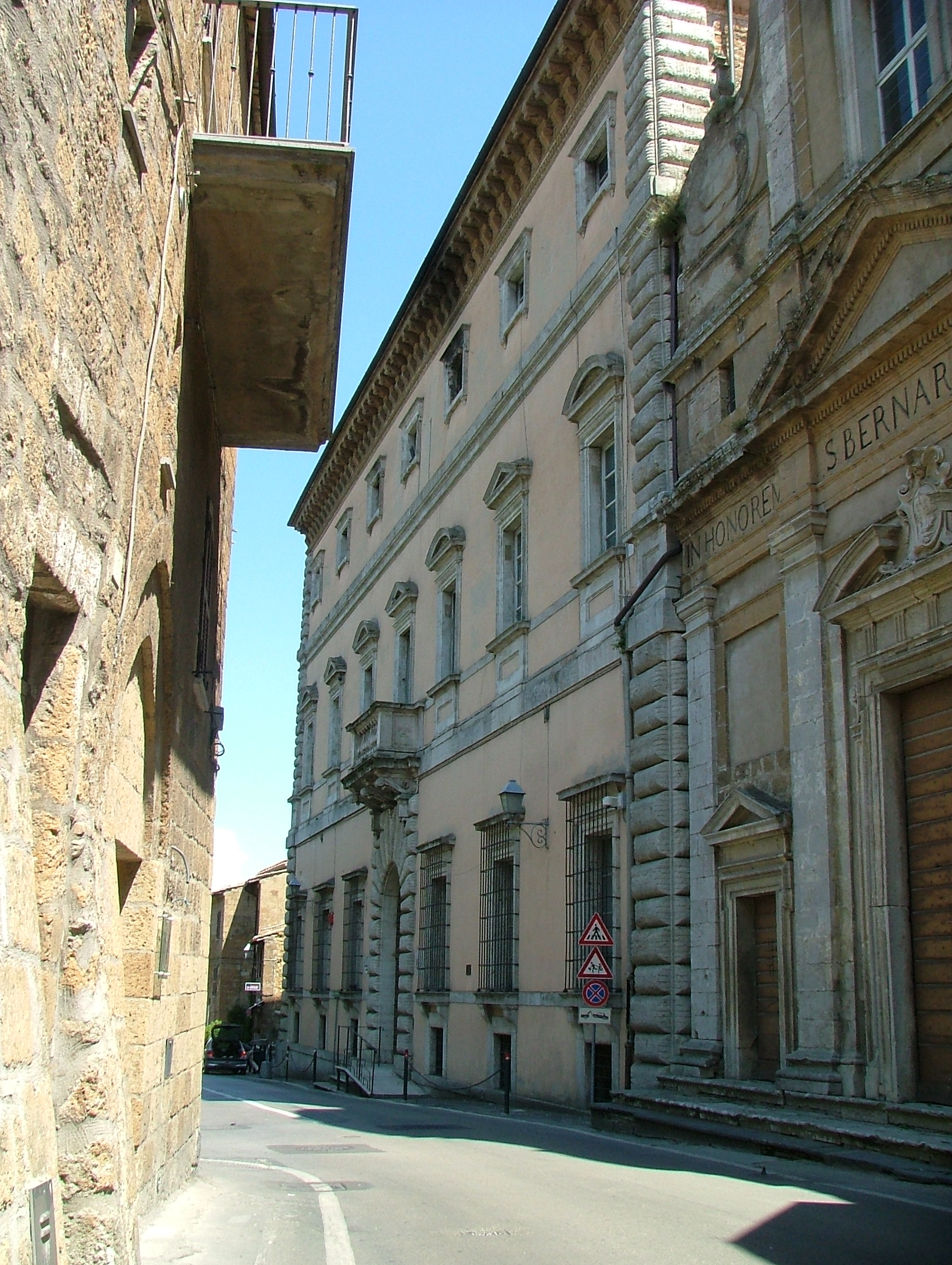
Palazzo Crispo Marsciano, to the left is the church of San Bernardino

Palazzo Crispo Marsciano, previously known simply as the Palazzo Marsciano is a Renaissance architecture palace located on Via Postierla #9 on Piazza Marconi in the historic center of Orvieto in the region of Umbria, Italy.

The palace was commissioned by Tiberio Crispo, who had three maternal half-brothers that were sons of Cardinal (al secolo) Alessandro Farnese, who became Pope Paul III, and his mistress. In the 1540s, Crispo was appointed governor of Perugia, castellan of Castel Sant’Angelo, and finally cardinal in 1544. This palace was designed circa 1540 by Antonio da Sangallo the younger. It is adjacent to the church of San Bernardino. Only the ground floor was complete from construction during 1543–1546, when Sangallo died. It is likely the work was continued by Raffaello da Montelupo, but was still incomplete in 1566. Ludovico di Gasparo dei Conti di Marsciano bought the incomplete palace in 1586. The palace was completed by Ippolito Scalza. The nuns of the adjacent convent of San Bernardino purchased the palace in 1618. In the 19th-century, it was acquired by the city government.
