= Nobuyuki Okumura (sculptor) =

Italian sculptor from Japan

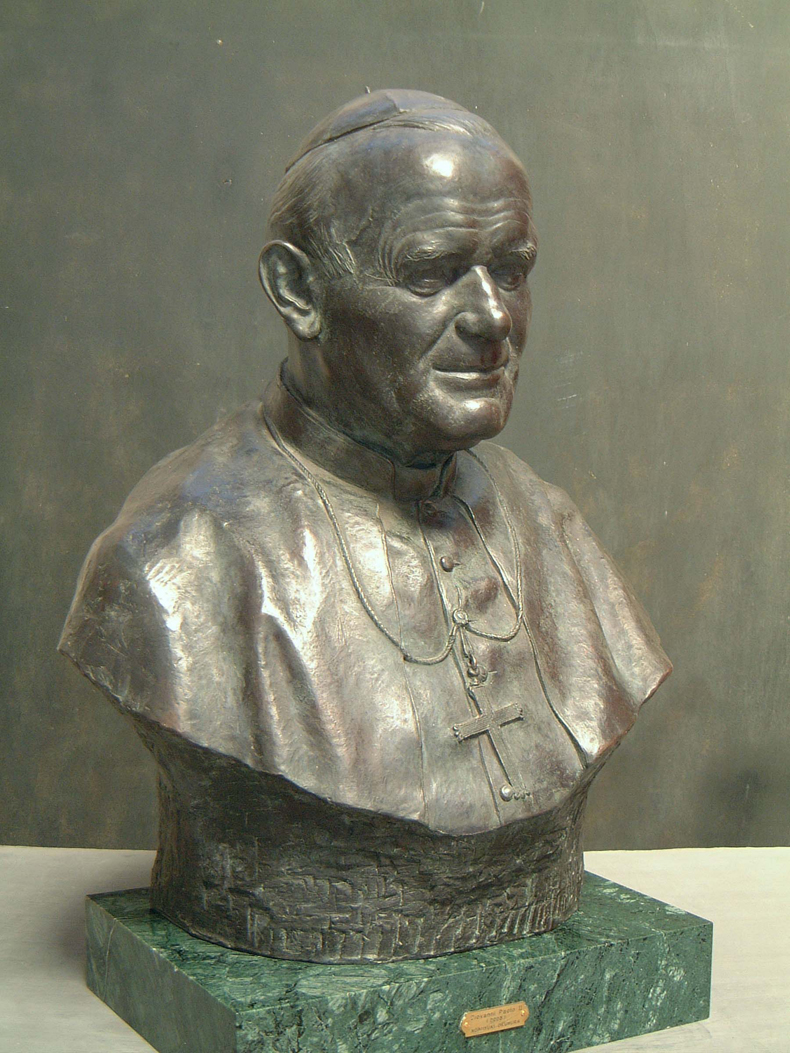
Bust of Pope John Paul II, 2003

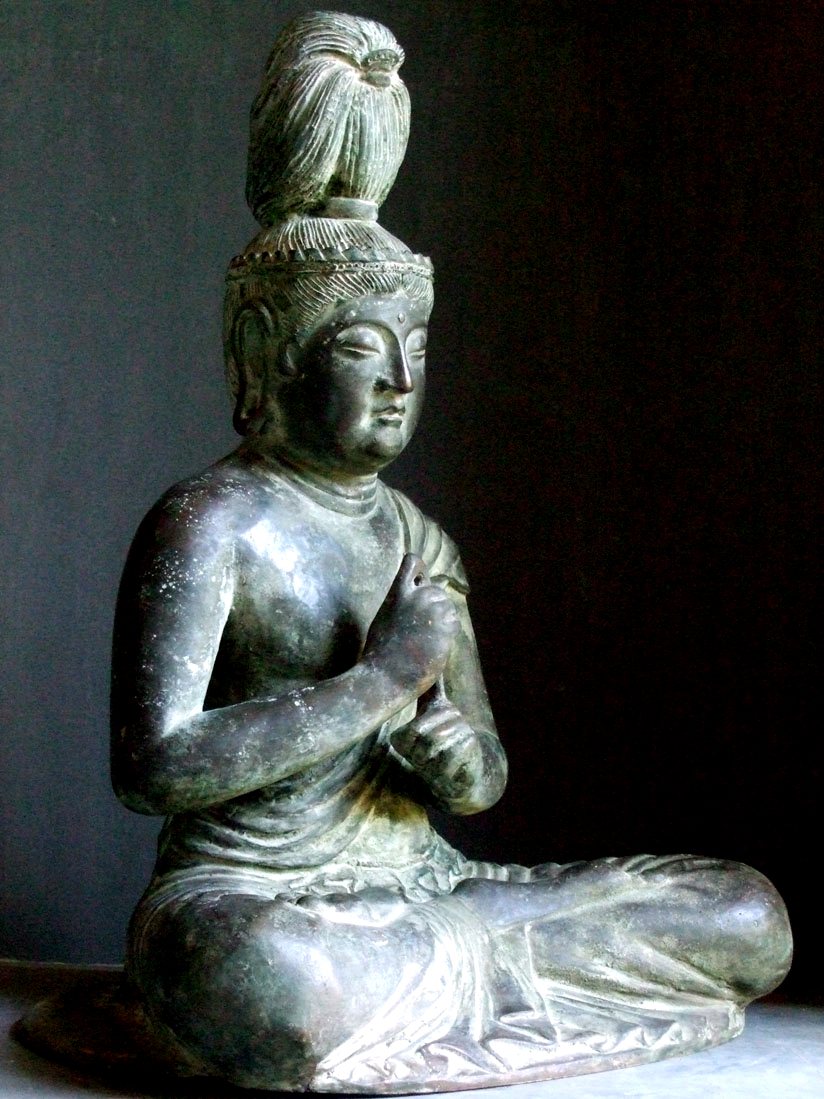
Seated Statue of Dainichi Nyorai, 2023

Nobuyuki Okumura (Japanese: 奥村信之, Hepburn: Okumura Nobuyuki; born August 6, 1953) is a Japanese figurative sculptor who has lived in Italy. He is known for bronze works created through the Italian lost-wax casting method and for creating sculptures of three successive Popes which were each installed in Vatican City.

Almost all of his works have been displayed at churches, academies, museums, public institutions and private collections in both Italy and Japan.

== Early life and education ==
Okumura was born in Tokyo in 1953. He entered the Department of Sculpture at Tokyo Gakugei University in 1973 and went to Rome to study sculpture at the Accademia di Belle Arti di Roma in 1975. After returning to Japan and graduating from his university in 1977, he continued creating works in Japan.

== Career ==
In 1985 Okumura moved to Italy and became an assistant to the American sculptor Milton Hebald. In 1990 he became a disciple of Emilio Greco, who praised Okumura's modeling skill in realism, particularly in portraiture. In 1992 his works were exhibited at Greco's associated gallery "L'Ippocastano" in Rome. In 1996 he received a message of commendation from Carlo Scognamiglio Pasini, President of the Senate, recognizing him as an artist capable of "keeping alight the flame of Italian [sculptural] tradition". He created sculptures of three successive Popes—John Paul II, Benedict XVI, and Francis—from 2003 to 2017. His work Hippocrates Thinking was awarded the Grand Prize at the 1st Yukuhashi Public Sculpture Exhibition of Japan in 2017. He works at his atelier built in a converted grotto near Lake Bracciano in Italy and also creates sculptures of mythological figures and Buddhist deities in addition to actual people and animals.

== Artistic style ==
Okumura's works are characterized by delicate and realistic figurative sculptures that are based on the traditional anatomical interpretation originating from the style of Greco-Roman world. Following the advice of Emilio Greco to create "lively works filled with warmth", he aims to capture not only the external appearance but also the inner character of his model. This results in the universality of his portraiture. Dynamics of the traditional Western Art and exquisiteness of the traditional Eastern Art are found in his works which lead to blending Western and Eastern cultures.

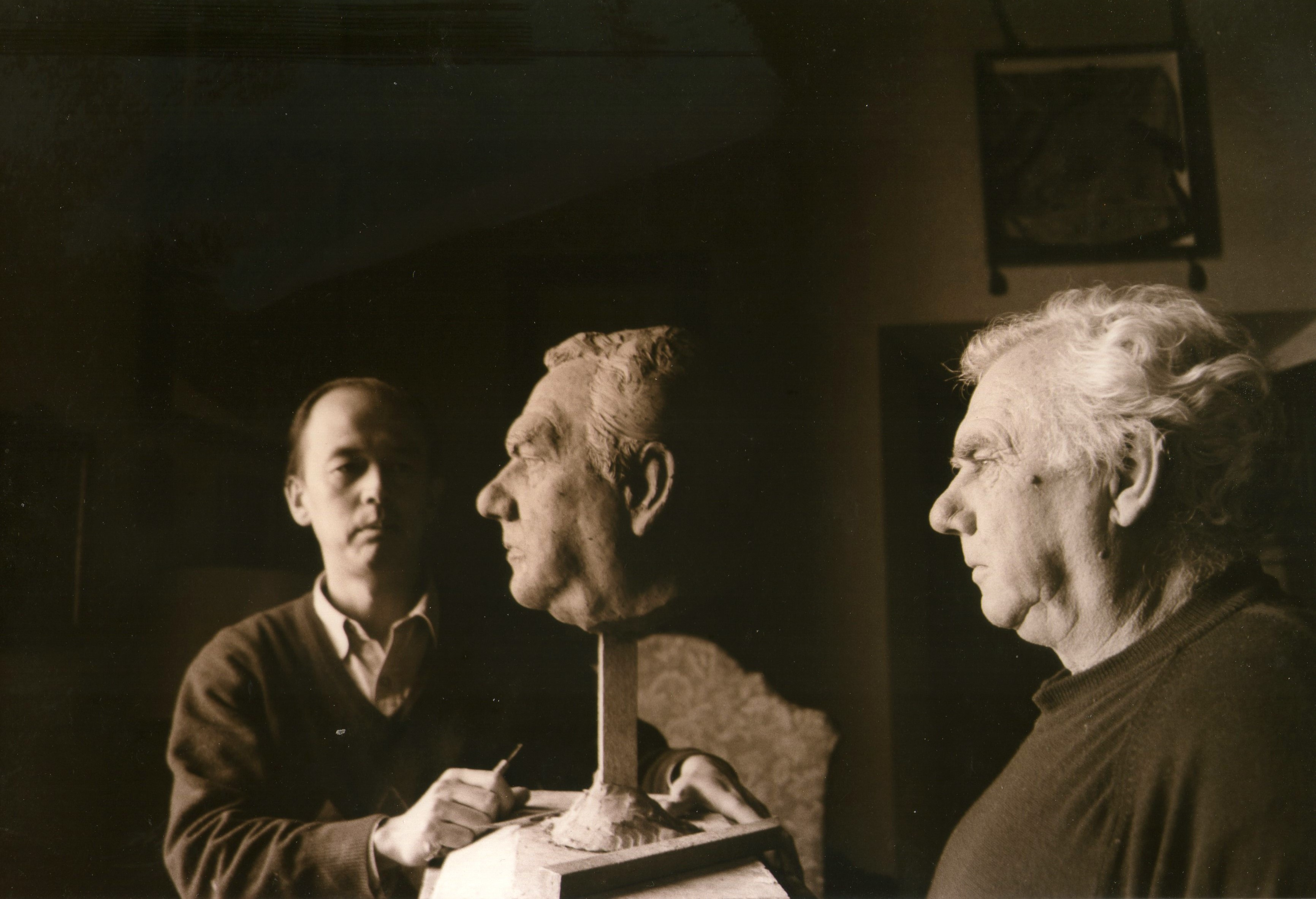
Creating the portrait of Paolo Borghese by Okumura, 1998

== Major works ==
- Bust of Pope John Paul II (2003–2006, installed in the Barberini Hall of the Vatican Library, facing the bust of Pope Urban VIII by Gian Lorenzo Bernini, Vatican city)
- Statue of Pope Benedict XVI (2006, installed in Vatican city and moved to Monte Cassino Abbey, Italy)
- Bust of Pope Francis (2017, installed in front of the entrance to the Barberini Hall of the Vatican Library, Vatican city)
- Portrait of Count Antonio Chiocchio (1995, Bracciano, Italy)
- Portrait of Paolo Borghese (1998, Palazzo Borghese, Artena, Italy)
- Portrait of Franz von Lobstein, Roma director of the Order of Malta (1998, Villa of the Priorate of Malta, Rome, Italy)
- Portrait of Andrew Bertie, Grand Master of the Order of Malta (1999, The Magistral Palace of Sovereign Military Order of Malta, Rome, Italy)
- Bust of Eiko Tsuboi, President of the Japan Medical Association (2001, Japan Medical Association Hall, Tokyo, Japan)
- French Bulldog and American Boxer (2010, Ravenna Museum, Italy)
- Hippocrates Thinking (2017, Librio Yukuhashi, Fukuoka prefecture, Japan)
- Minerva (2018, Senzoku Gakuen, Kanagawa, Japan)

== See also ==
- Lost-wax casting
- Emilio Greco
