= Palazzo Buzi, Orvieto =

Renaissance architecture palace

Palazzo Buzi

General information
- Architectural style: Renaissance with Mannerist elements
- Location: Via Postierla #9, Piazza Marconi, Orvieto, Umbria, Italy
- Coordinates: 42.71651°N 12.11400°E
- Completed: 1581
- Client: Vicenzo Buzi
- Owner: Padri Mercedari (since 1899)

Design and construction
- Architect: Ippolito Scalza

Palazzo Buzi is a Renaissance architecture palace located on Via Postierla #9 on Piazza Marconi in the historic center of Orvieto in the region of Umbria, Italy. The palace stands next to the San Bernardino, and has been recently used as an inn (Villa Mercede) inside a monastery, administered by Mercedarians, or nuns of the Order of Mercy.

The site was originally occupied by a home and tower belonging to the Ghibelline Filippeschi family, it was likely confiscated in 1281 by the Guelph Bishop Francesco Monaldeschi, and used by him as a residence. The nuns of the adjacent nunnery of San Bernardino acquired the site, probably in the 16th century. In 1581, Vicenzo Buzi, wealthy aristocrat, bought the vineyard and orchards here from the nuns of San Bernardino, and commissioned Ippolito Scalza to build this palace on the site. By the end of the 18th century, the Gualterio family became owners of the palace. They exchanged the highly decorated Mannerist-style stone portal from this palace with the simpler portal from the facade of Palazzo Gualterio on Via del Duomo. The palace was purchased in 1899 by the Padri Mercedari, who still own it.

The main floor of the palace was originally decorated circa 1585 with frescoes depicting Mythologic and Old testament themes by Cesare Nebbia and Giovanni Battista Lombardelli, but some were replaced by 19th century frescoes by Mariano Piervittori. The area is used as a chapel by the friars.
