= Gualterio family =

Gualterio di Corgnolo
- Country: Papal States; Italy; Italy
- Titles: Cardinal (non-hereditary); Patrizio of Orvieto; Patrizio Romano; Noble of Viterbo; Noble of Loreto; Earl of Dundee (Jacobite Peerage); Marquis of Corgnolo
- Motto: Hesperidum munus (Latin for 'Gift of the Hesperides'); Non totus iaceo (Latin for 'I never completely lie still')

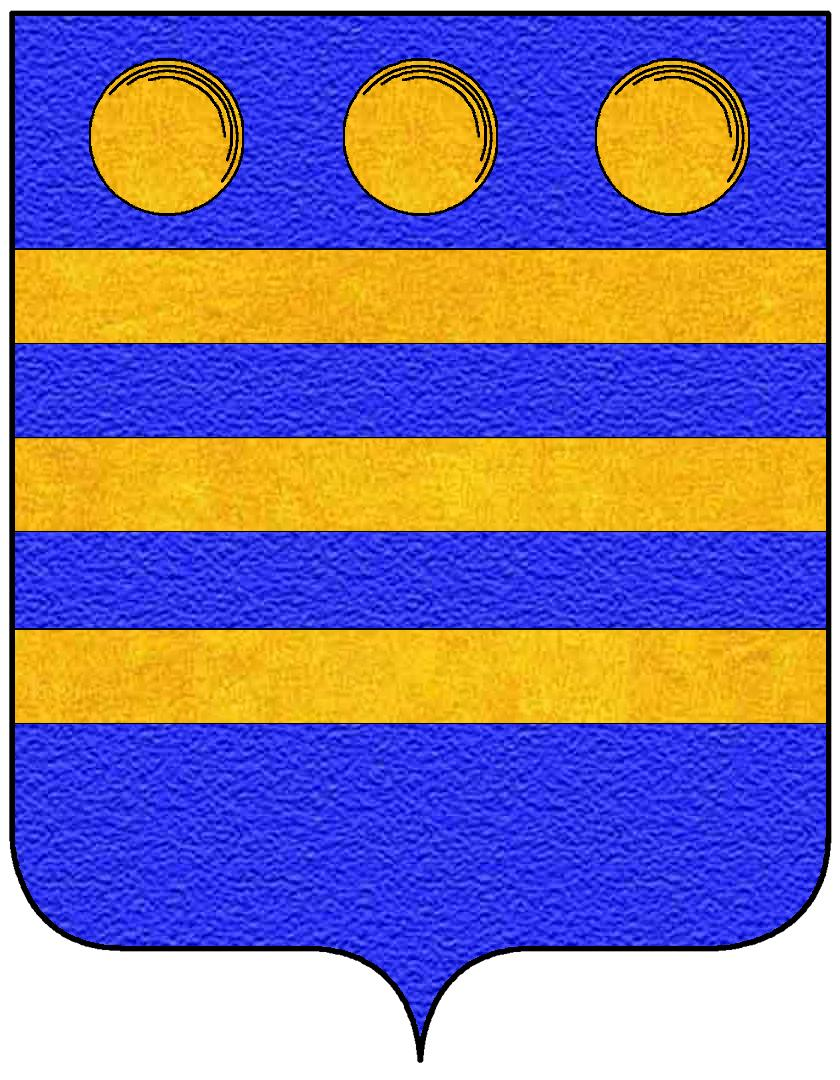
Coat of arms of Gualterio family

The House of Gualterio (in the past, also Gualtieri) is an Italian aristocratic family, with its first documented roots in the 12th century and links to France and the Stuarts. The Gualterio family (Gualterio di Corgnolo) has spawned various aristocratic titles including the extant Marquis of Corgnolo (1723) and, under the Jacobite peerage, Earl of Dundee (1705). The present head and heir to the titles is Luigi Gualterio (b. 1955).

== History ==
The Gualterio family bore the surname Gualterini or Gualcherini when Otto I, Holy Roman Emperor, around 975, appointed it among the hundred consul families for the government of Orvieto.

In addition to the noble status in Orvieto (1067), where many members of the family held roles such as gonfaloniere, governatore and Signore Sette, the family was co-opted in the nobility of Viterbo (1566), Rome (1518), Fabriano (1686), Todi (1689), Camerino (1691), Loreto (1694) and San Marino (1704).

== Members of the family ==
- Agnese Gualterio, founded in 1325 with her brother Vanne, the jus patronatus of St. John the Baptist, St. John the Evangelist and St. Catherine in the church of St. Biagio in Orvieto.
- Raffaele Gualterio, known as "il Moro", who gave his name to the Torre del Moro in Orvieto, citizen of the Roman Senate (1529), Pope Julius III's ambassador to Sebastian of Portugal (by whom he was admitted in the Order of Christ).
- Sebastiano Gualterio (1513–1566), Bishop of Viterbo (1551–1566), Nuncio to France (1554–1556 and 1560–1561) and delegate to the Council of Trent (1562).
- Paolo Gualterio, Treasurer General of the Patrimony of Saint Peter, in 1599 married Antonia Pamphilj, sister of Pope Innocent X.
- Vittoria Gualterio in 1580 married Sforza Maidalchini and was mother to Olimpia Maidalchini.
- Cardinal Carlo Gualterio (1613–1673).
- Cardinal Filippo Antonio Gualterio (1660–1728), Nuncio to France (1700–1706), from 1706 Cardinal Protector of Scotland and from 1717 Cardinal Protector of England, advisor to James Francis Edward Stuart, Founder of a monumental library and collector of antiquities. Honorary member of the Académie des Inscriptions et Belles-Lettres (1715).
- Sebastiano Giulio Gualterio (1667), Knight of Order of Santiago (1706).
- Giovanni Battista (1668–1740), created Marquis of Corgnolo, near Orvieto, by Pope Innocent XIII in 1723. Between 1713 and 1720 he was Duke of Cumia (created by King Philip V of Spain and, under the Jacobite peerage, Earl of Dundee, Viscount of Eythorne, Peer of Scotland, Knight of Saint Andrew (1705), Knight of the Order of the Thistle (1708).
- Innocenzo Felice Raimondo Gualterio (1670), Knight of Order of Calatrava (1706).
- Raffaele Benedetto Gualterio, Knight of Order of Saint Stephen (1696).
- Cardinal Luigi Gualterio, also known as Ludovico (1706–1761), Nuncio to France (1754–1759).
- Senator Filippo Antonio Gualterio, (1819–1874).

== Historical buildings ==
The Palazzo Gualterio in Orvieto was built following the initial project of Antonio da Sangallo. According to Giorgio Vasari, Simone Mosca completed the façade. Various members of the family are buried in the family chapel, within the Chapel of the Madonna di San Brizio in the Orvieto Cathedral.
