= Palazzo Monaldeschi, Orvieto =

Coordinates: 42.71656°N 12.11043°E

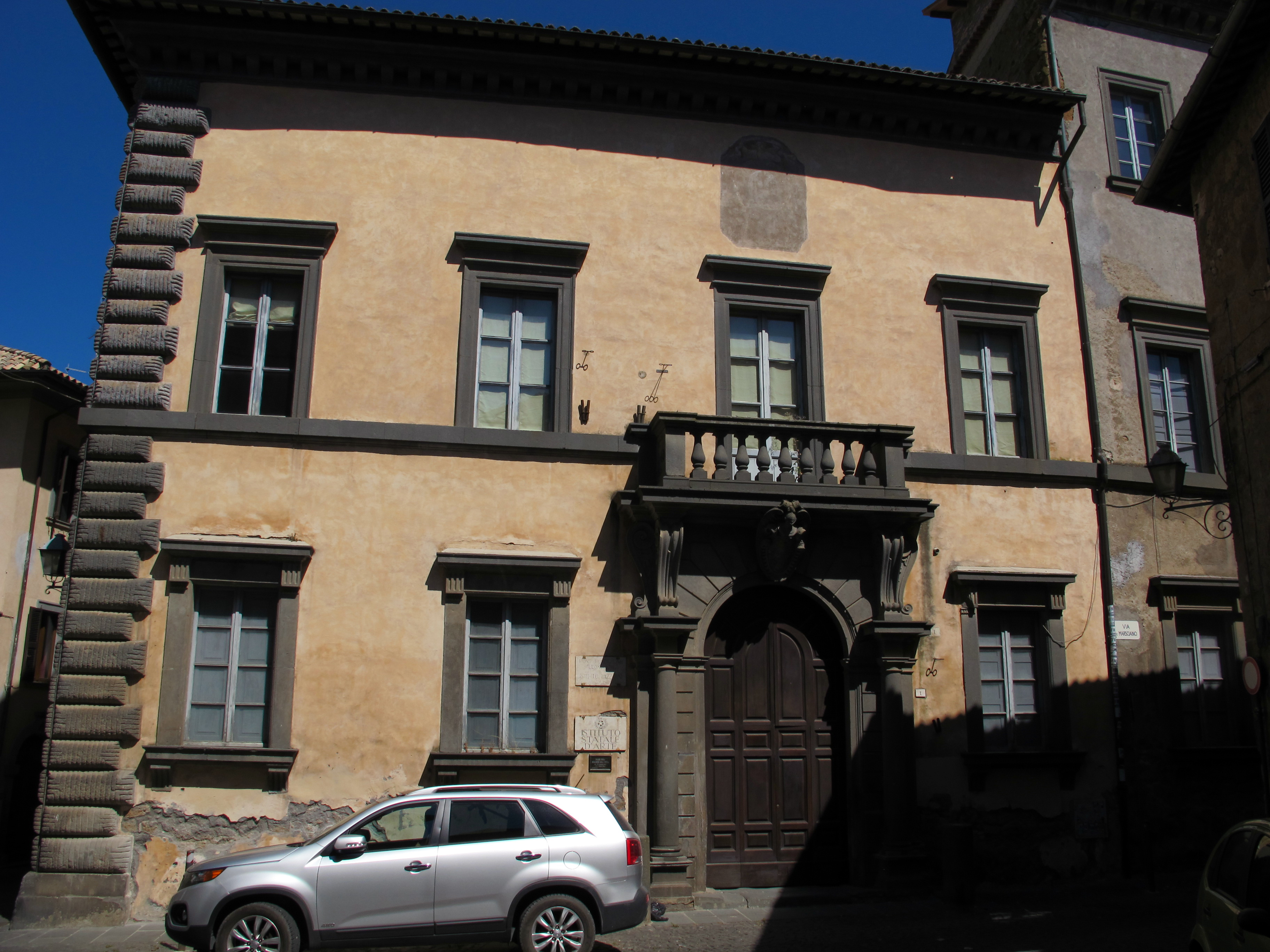
Portion of facade of Palazzo Monaldeschi at the end of Via Beato Angelico

The Palazzo Monaldeschi, known also as Palazzo Sforza Monaldeschi della Cervara or as Palazzo Marsciano or Meoni or, is a Renaissance architecture, aristocratic palace located on Piazza Ippolito Scalza in the historic center of Orvieto in the Region of Umbria, Italy. It is located about a block north of the church of San Francesco on Via Beato Angelico #52, corner with Via di Maurizio.

The prominent Monaldeschi family has various palaces in Central Italy, and exerted significant power in medieval Orvieto. Putatively Simone Mosca designed a palace circa 1570 for the Counts della Cervara, likely including this palace commissioned by Sforza Monaldeschi della Cervara. The palaces was enlarged (1574-1575) after the reign of Pope Pius IV by Ippolito Scalza, who designed ten windows for the facade (1572) as well as some internal refurbishments. The Salone della Camminata was frescoed by Cesare Nebbia or a team under his guidance including Cesare and Vincenzo Conti, Giovanni Battista Lombardelli, and Angelo Righi. The colorfulquadro riportati with Trompe-l'œil architecture and statues depict the signs of the zodiac, the constellations, and also mythologic scenes including Amore and Psyche, Kronus, Apollo and Daphne, Icarus, and Astrea and Prometheus. The central coat of arms was modified to add the black eagle symbol of the Marsciano.

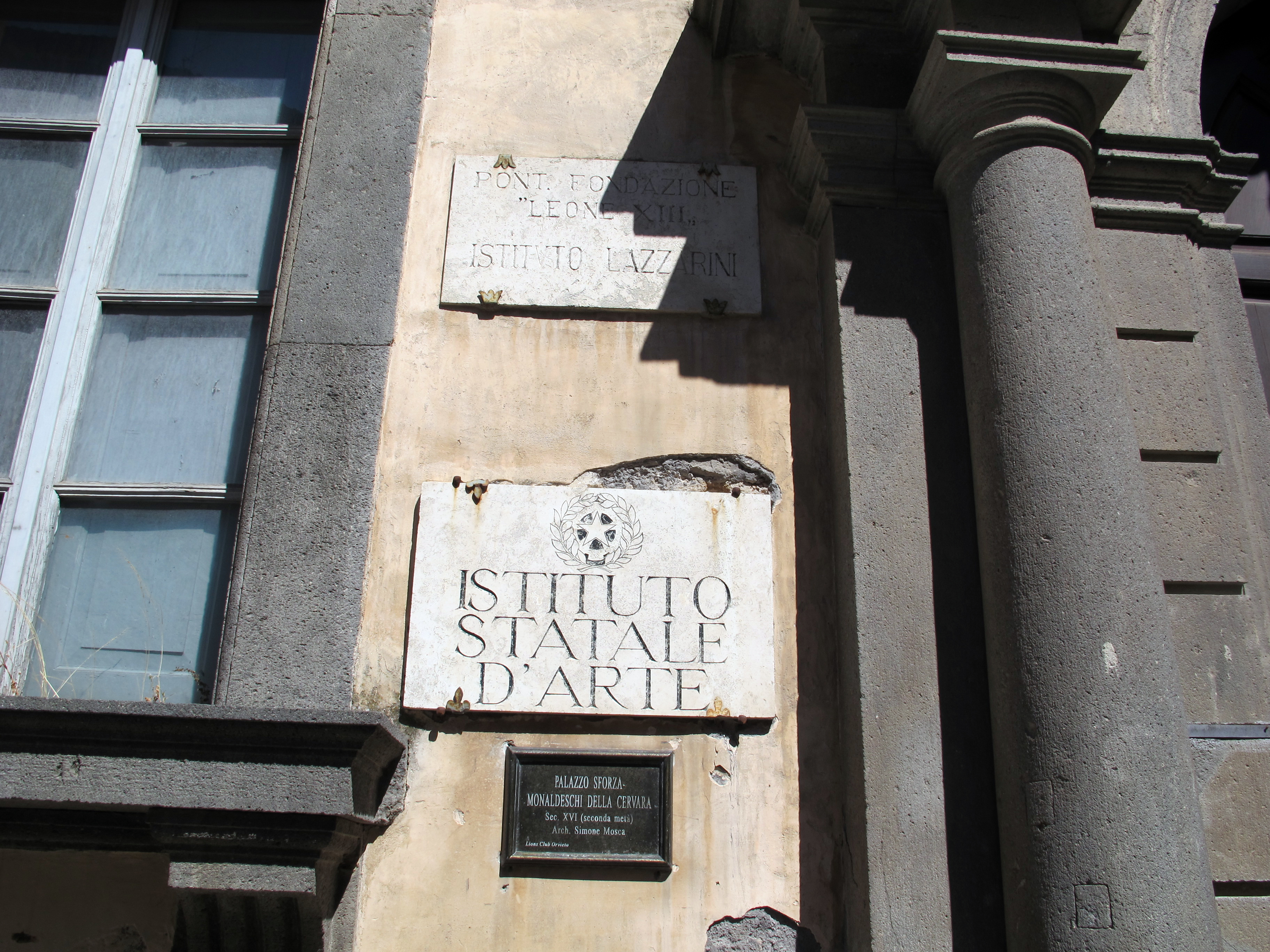
Plaques to the right of entrance

Over the centuries the palace has had various owners and uses. The Jesuits were temporarily housed here when they arrived in Orvieto in 1621. Orazio da Marsciano acquired the palace in the early 17th century, and it remained in his family for over 200 years. The Marsciano heraldic shield is sculpted above the main portal on Via Beato Angelico. Plaques along the door announce its prior and present roles as the Istituto Lazzarini and as an Institute of Art. At the end of the 19th century, it was acquired by the Salesians, using a donation from the Lazzarini family. In 1893, Pope Leo XIII approved its adaptation by Paolo Zampi to form the Collegio Leonino. The palace houses offices of the Istituto Statale d'Arte di Orvieto.
