= Carlo Gualterio =

Italian Catholic cardinal

- Archbishop of Fermo Emeritus, Cardinal priest of Sant'Eusebio
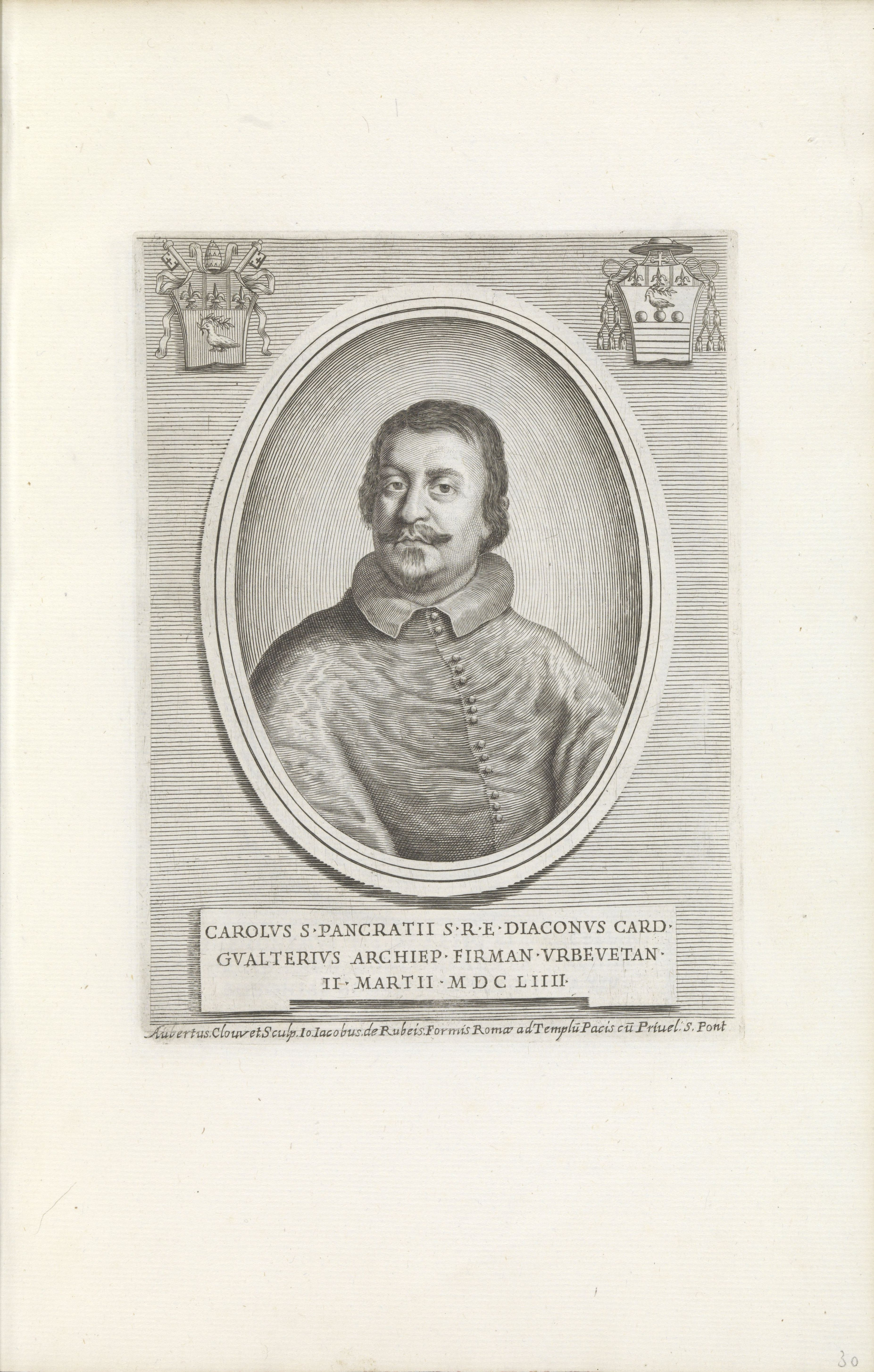
- See: Archdiocese of Fermo
- Installed: 5 October 1654 — before 30 April 1668
- Successor: Giannotto Gualterio
- Other posts: Previously Rector of La Sapienza University, Rome

Orders
- Created cardinal: 2 March 1654

Personal details
- Born: 1613 Orvieto, Italy
- Died: 1 January 1673 at age of 59 Rome, Italy

Carlo Gualterio (1613 – 1 January 1673) was an Italian Catholic cardinal.

== Biography ==
Gualterio was born at Orvieto. In his family, Silvio Antoniani was cardinal and Sebastiano Gualterio had been Bishop of Viterbo, Papal Nuncio to France and the Council of Trent. He was related to Donna Olimpia Maidalchini and Pope Innocent X Pamphilj, and also grand-uncle of Cardinal Filippo Antonio Gualterio and great-grand-uncle of Cardinal Luigi Gualterio.

He studied law and became a consistorial lawyer. Later he was made referendary of the Tribunals of the Apostolic Signature and Rector of La Sapienza University, Rome.

Carlo Gualterio was created cardinal deacon in the consistory of 2 March 1654 by Pope Innocent X and opted for the deaconry of S. Pancrazio. From 1672 to 1673, he was Camerlengo of the Sacred College of Cardinals.

He was elected Archbishop of Fermo on 5 October 1654. He took part in the Papal conclave of 1655 and in that of 1667. He resigned the government of the archdiocese before 30 April 1668 in favour of his nephew Giannotto Gualterio. Promoted to the order of Cardinal Priest on 25 December 1668 with the title of Sant'Eusebio, he participated in the Papal Conclave of 1669–1670.

Carlo Gualterio died in 1673 of an apoplexy in Rome. He was transferred to Orvieto and buried in the tomb of his family in the local cathedral
