= San Giacomo Maggiore, Orvieto =

Building in Orvieto, Italy

Coordinates: 42.71646°N 12.11326°E

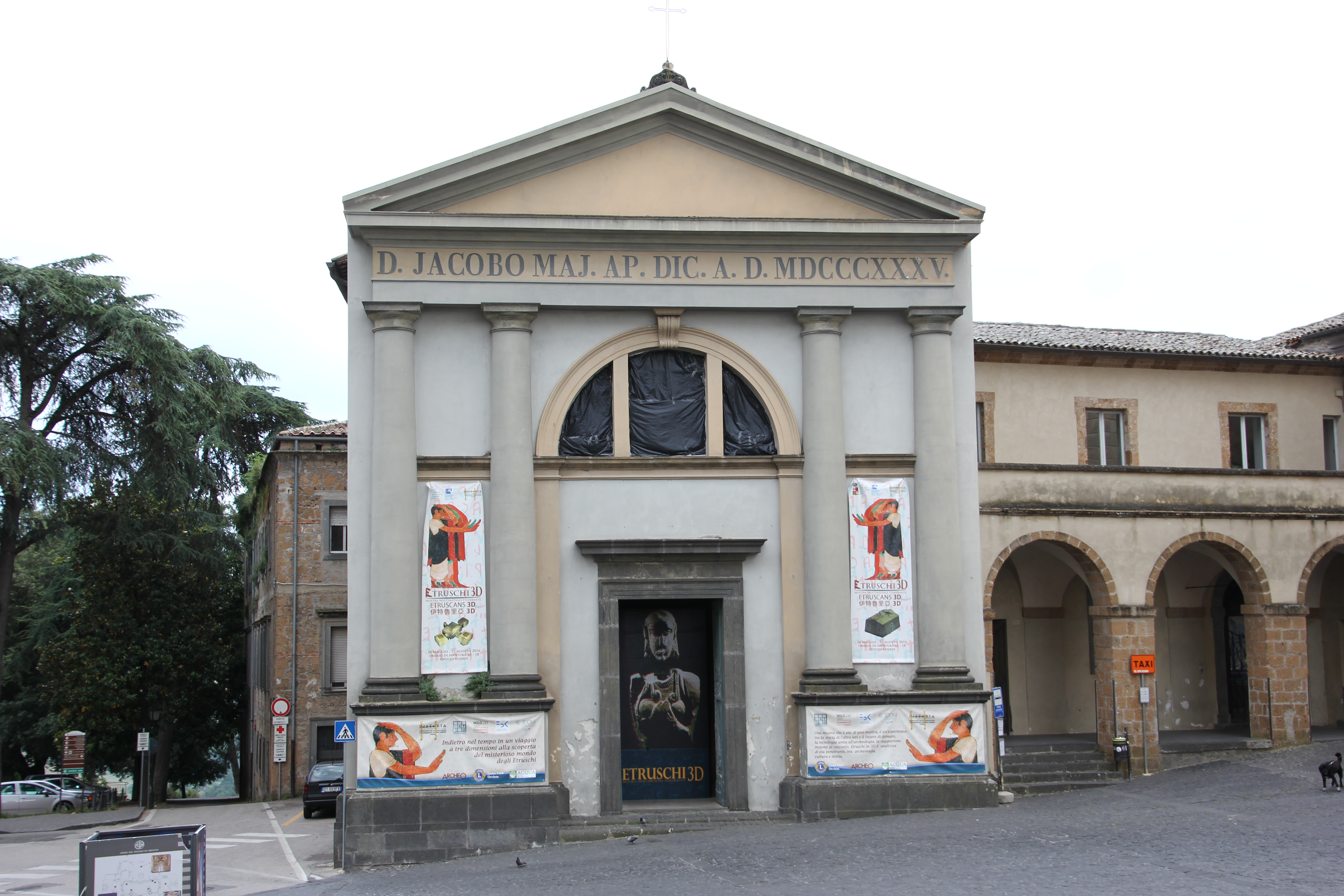
Facade of church of San Giacomo Maggiore, with portion of former hospital of Santa Maria della Stella to the right

San Giacomo Maggiore is a Neoclassical architecture, Roman Catholic church located on Piazza del Duomo #10, with a facade facing north to the cathedral piazza, just to the west of Palazzo Soliano, and adjacent to the former hospital of Santa Maria della Stella, in Orvieto, region of Umbria, Italy.

== History and description ==
A church at the site was consecrated in 1291 by Pope Nicholas IV. Over the centuries, the building became dilapidated requiring it to be razed in 1790, and rebuilt in 1835 in the present neoclassical style. The church had a chaplain assigned by the bishop, and was maintained by the Congregation of Public Charity.

The church was affiliated with the adjacent hospice or hospital of Santa Maria della Stella (located behind the arches to the right of the church), which was also a brefotrofio or foundling hospital ministered to the pilgrims and poor traveling to Rome. The hospital also was founded by Pope Nicholas IV and initially staffed by the Cavalieri di San Giacomo di Altopascio, a hospitaller order. The facility by the 19th-century had become the civic hospital. The hospital was refurbished in 1892–1910 by Paolo Zampi. This hospital was closed in 2000, when the new larger Ospedale di Santa Maria della Stella opened at nearby Ciconia.
