= Ippolito Scalza =

Italian Renaissance sculptor and architect

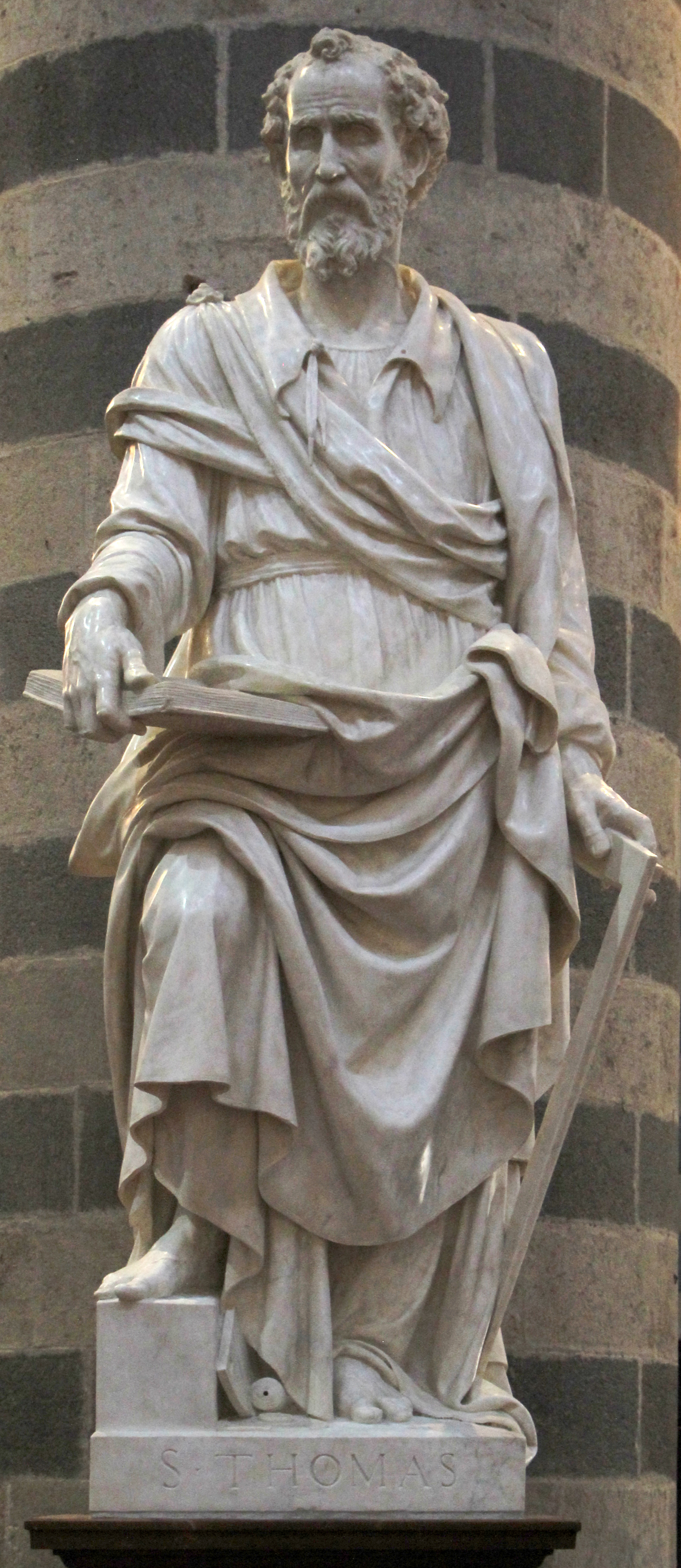
St Thomas Apostle

Ippolito Scalza (1532 – 22 December 1617) was a sculptor and architect of the Italian Renaissance, active in his native Orvieto as well as Todi and other towns in Umbria.

== Biography and works ==
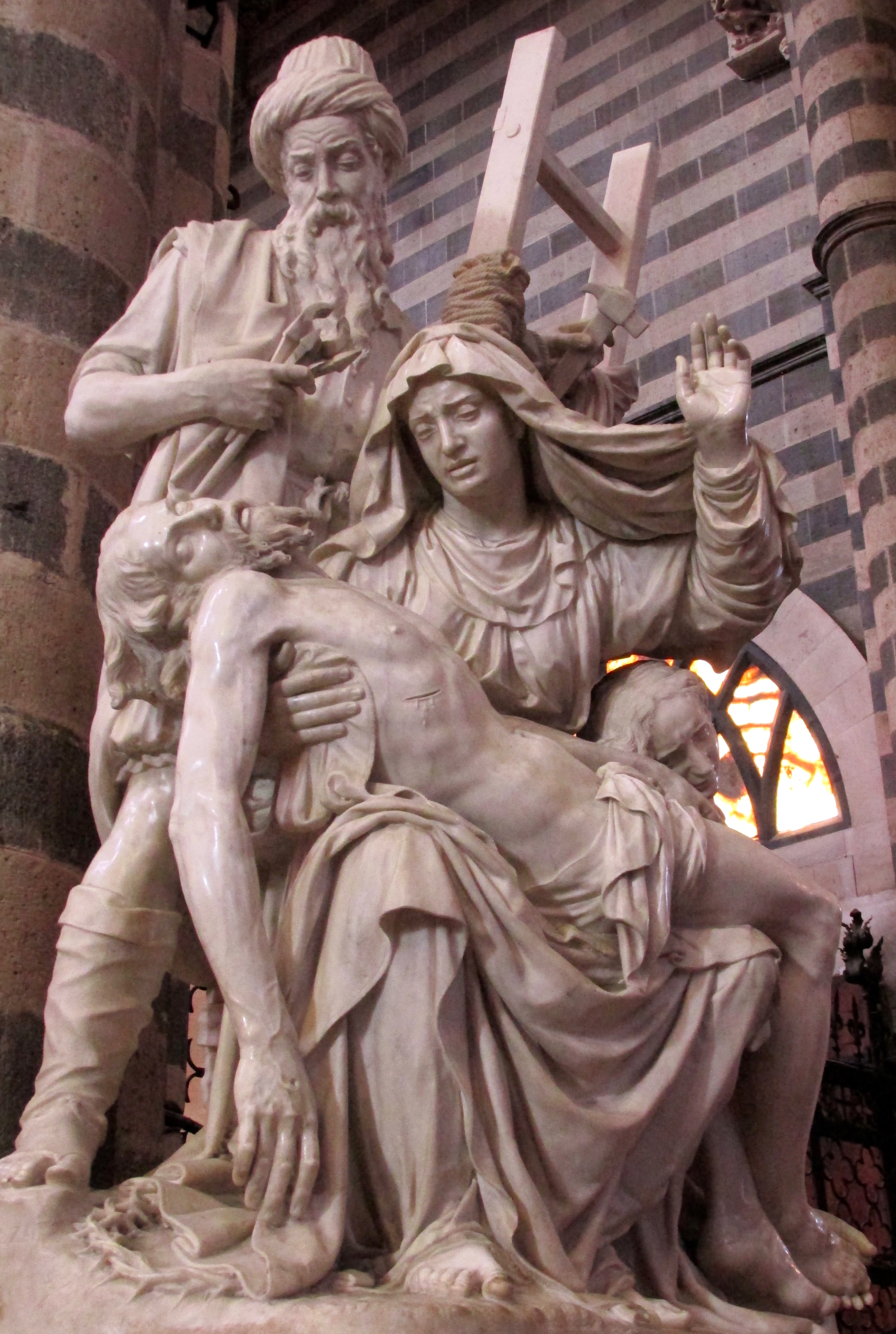
Group of the Pieta

Ippolito was born in Orvieto to a family of moderate resources; his father was likely a mason in the Fabbrica (construction works) of the Duomo of this town. Three of his siblings, Francesco, Alessandro, and Lodovico, gained training as mosaicists, sculptors, and minor architects. Of Ippolito, the first we see documented of his work is the 1554 completion of cornice molding of a chapel in the cathedral. In 1556, he completed a statue of a St Sebastian for the cathedral. This apparently allowed him to apprentice in the studio of Michelangelo Buonaroti. In 1567, he succeeded Raffaello da Montelupo as architect for the Fabbrica del Duomo. He next sculpted, all for the Duomo, the statue of St Thomas Apostle and, from a single piece of Carrara marble, the Group of the Pieta (1570–1579) located in the Cappella della Madonna di San Brizio. In addition to his many works in the cathedral the following years, he designed various buildings including:

=== Orvieto ===
- Restoration of Palazzo Soliano (1564–70)
- Palazzo Clementini (1567)
- Completion of Palazzo Monaldeschi (1570–4)
- Refurbishments of Palazzo del Governatore (1571–98)
- Palazzo Comunale (1574)
- Convent of San Francesco (now part of the civic library Luigi Fumi) (1580)
- Palazzo Saracinelli (1580)
- Work inside and of the structure of the Chiesa dell’ Annunziata(1585–97)
- Completion of Palazzo Crispo Marsciano (ca. 1586)
- Water stoup, church of San Bernardino (1588)
- Palazzo Simoncelli (13th century, restored 16th century)
- Palazzo Carvajal (16th century)
- Restructuring of San Lorenzo in Vineis (17th century)

=== Outside of Orvieto ===
Monument to Baldo Farrattini, Duomo of Amelia (1561–4)

- Palazzo Scotti, Narni (1567)
- Santa Maria della Consolazione, Todi (1508–1609)
- Tempio del Santissimo Crocifisso, Todi (1589–1606)
- Portal of Palazzo Cesi, Todi (ca. 1600)

Soon after his death, the commune commissioned a plaque to celebrate his works.
