= Sant'Andrea, Orvieto =

Church building in Orvieto, Italy

Coordinates: 42.7182°N 12.1087°E

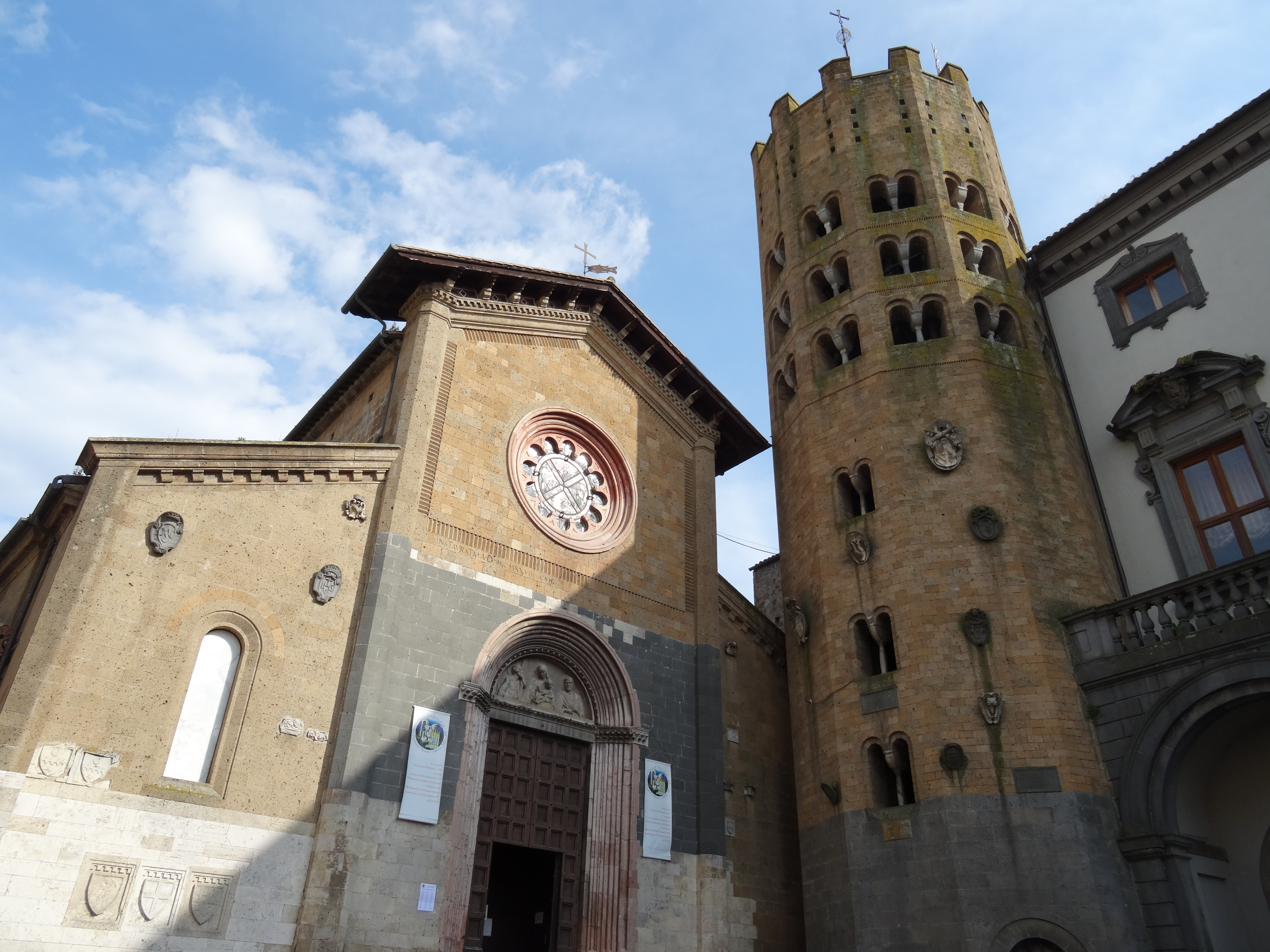

Sant'Andrea is a late-Romanesque-Gothic architecture, Roman Catholic church on the Piazza della Repubblica in Orvieto, region of Umbria, Italy. It dates to the 12th century and is noted for its distinctive decagonal bell tower. the church rises adjacent to the Palazzo Comunale or city hall of Orvieto.

== History and description ==
Tradition holds that the church was built at the site of the forum and a temple of Juno. The archeological findings in the crypt of the church suggest a paleo-christian foundation; documents record a refurbishment of a mosaic pavement in 977, commissioned by pope Benedict VII. It was originally dedicated to the apostles Andrew and Bartholemew, and reconsecrated in 1013 by pope Benedict VIII. The Bell-tower was added at the start of the 13th-century.

The facade of the church reflects a 1926 refurbishment that added a bas-relief to the portal and a rose-window above. The interior has a central nave and two aisles separated by a arches and columns. Adjacent to the bell-tower is the mannerist-architecture City Hall.
