= Palazzo Gualterio =

Coordinates: 42.71814°N 12.11131°E

Palazzo Gualterio is a Renaissance architecture aristocratic palace located diagonal across Corso Cavour from the Torre del Moro in Orvieto in the Province of Terni, Italy. The palace is flanked on three sides by Via del Duomo, Corso Cavour, and Via dei Gualteri, with facades on both the latter two streets. The main portal on Corso Cavour, located on number 72, is inscribed with the name of Trivulzio Gualterio. The original portal on the southern facade was exchanged for the Mannerist-style main portal of the Palazzo Buzi on Via Postierla in Orvieto. This portal, now in Palazzo Gualterio, was designed by Ippolito Scalza.

== History ==
The palace was built in the mid-1500s by the aristocrats Raffaele and Felice Gualterio, who commissioned a design from Antonio da Sangallo the Younger. Construction was completed by Simone Mosca. The historian, patriot and senator Filippo Antonio Gualterio, who died in 1874, was the last of the family to live there. The ownership briefly passed to the Misciatelli family. The palace was acquired by the Banco di Roma, while objects of art were transferred to the museum and halls of the Town Hall of Orvieto, where there are still preserved.

A British guide of Italy from stated the palace contained an interesting collection of

cartoons by Domenichino, Annibale Caracci, Baldassare Franceschini, Francesco Albani, and others, which the owner liberally permits strangers to visit. In the 1st room are 2 battlepieces by Franceschini, designed for Genoa. In the 2nd is a Temperance by Domenichino, and (other works). In the 3rd room, Mars by Caracci; and Joseph's Dream, by Carlo Cignani. In the 4th are Fame and History, by Domenichino. In the chapel adjoining is a beautiful fresco of the Archangel Michael, removed from its original position, and attributed to Luca Signorelli. It has been restored in parts by Professor Cornelius of Munich. In the 5th room are Fame, History, and Fidelity, by Domenichino; Love and Venus, and Love and Hymen, by Albani. In the 6th room is a series illustrating various events in the Life of St Catherine of Siena, by Caracci. On the roof of another room is a fresco of Endymion sleeping and surprised by Diana, said to be by Gherardo della Notte. In the gallery is a damaged Deposition, by Baroccio; and 2 (portrait busts), said to be by Titian.

The final attribution and disposition of these works is unclear.
