= Filippo Antonio Gualterio (senator) =

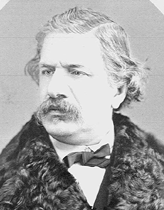
Fillipo Antonio Gualterio

Filippo Antonio Gualterio (6 August 1819 – 10 February 1874) was an Italian writer and statesman, he served as an Italian senator and as a minister of the interior for the Kingdom of Italy.

== Biography ==
Filippo was born to an aristocratic family in Orvieto. An ancestor of the same name (1660–1728) had been cardinal and papal nuncio to France. In the mid to late 1830s, the present Filippo studied at the Collegio de' noble di Roma and the Collegio dell'Assunta. In 1846, he published the annotated Unpublished Chronicle of Events in Orvieto and other parts of Italy from the year 1333 to the year 1400 by the Count Francesco di Montemarte. In 1848, he was named Captain of the Civic Guards of the Papal State. The next few years required a balancing between his Italian patriotism and fealty to the Papal State. He participated with papal troops under Giovanni Durando in the defense of Vicenza against Austrian forces

Filippo lived in this period either at his Villa Paolina in Porano or in his family palace in the center of Orvieto. On January 6, 1849, demonstrations broke out near his palace, which sheltered the papal treasury in town. The guard was called, and despite the efforts of the bishop Vespignani to calm both sides, shots broke out and one person died and various were wounded.

Filippo was affected by this outcome. This and the subsequent reaction in the following years, led to his exile from the Papal States, and he remained in Tuscany until 1861. He would subsequently write a multivolume history of the events of 1848–1849. In Piedmont, he befriended Count Cavour and was able to revisit Rome with a Sardinian passport. He was often criticized by the more radical, republican patriots such as Francesco Domenico Guerrazzi. By the 1860s, he was named to various civic posts through Italy, serving the Savoyard monarchy. He was General Intendant of Perugia (17 December 1860 - 13 March 1862) and Prefect of various cities: Genoa (11 January 1863 – 26 March 1865), Palermo (26 March 1865 – 9 April 1866) and Naples (9 April 1866 – 28 July 1867). He was also Royal Commissioner of Perugia and Orvieto from September 1860. He was Minister of the Interior of the Kingdom of Italy in 1867–1868, and later Minister of the Royal House.

By the end of the decade, he retired from public life, and died in Rome. A bust to him was dedicated in the Palazzo Comunale, along with that of Cavour.
