= Santissimo Crocifisso, Todi =

Church building in Todi, Italy

Coordinates: 42.780396°N 12.416393°E

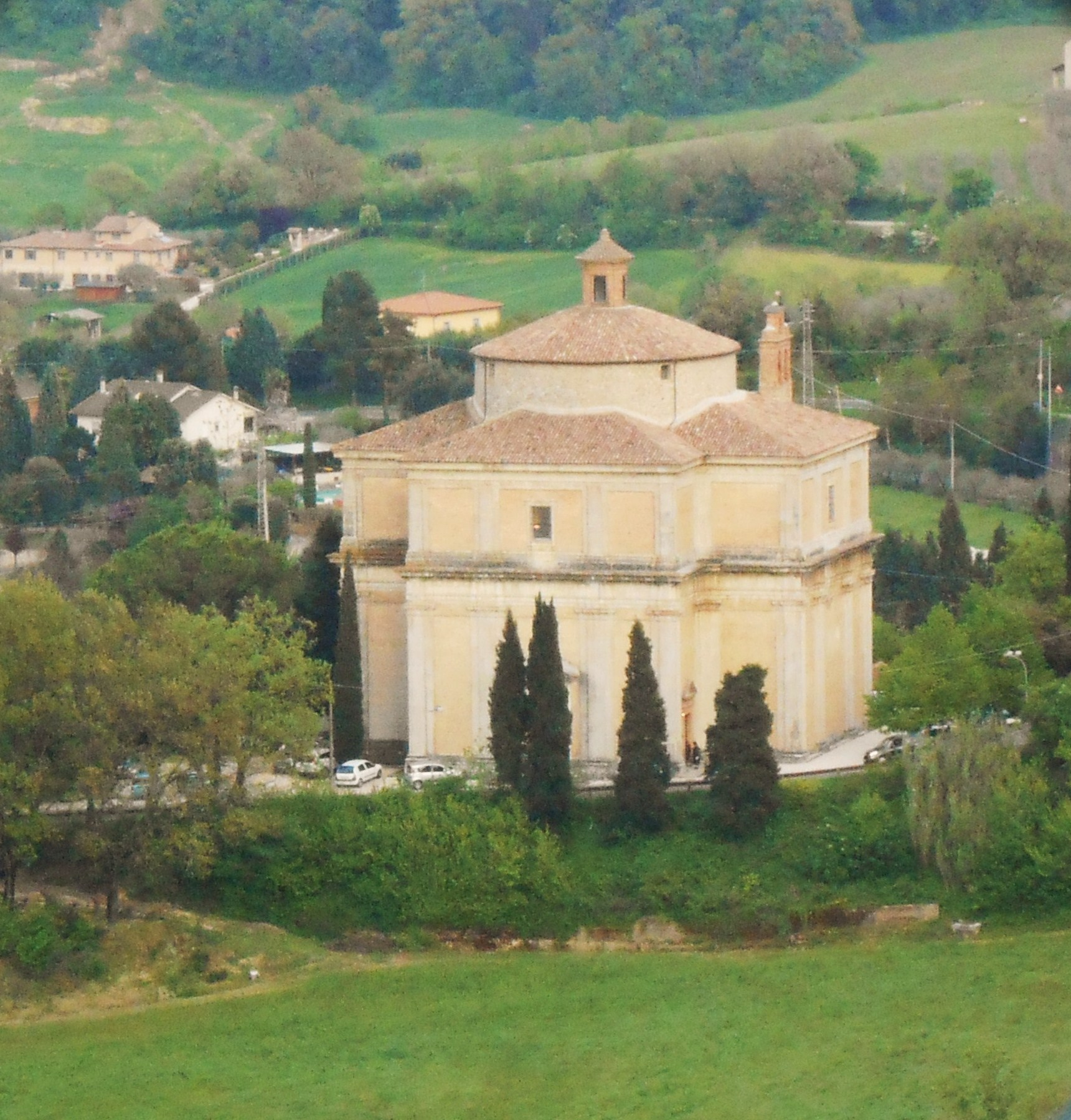
View of the church.

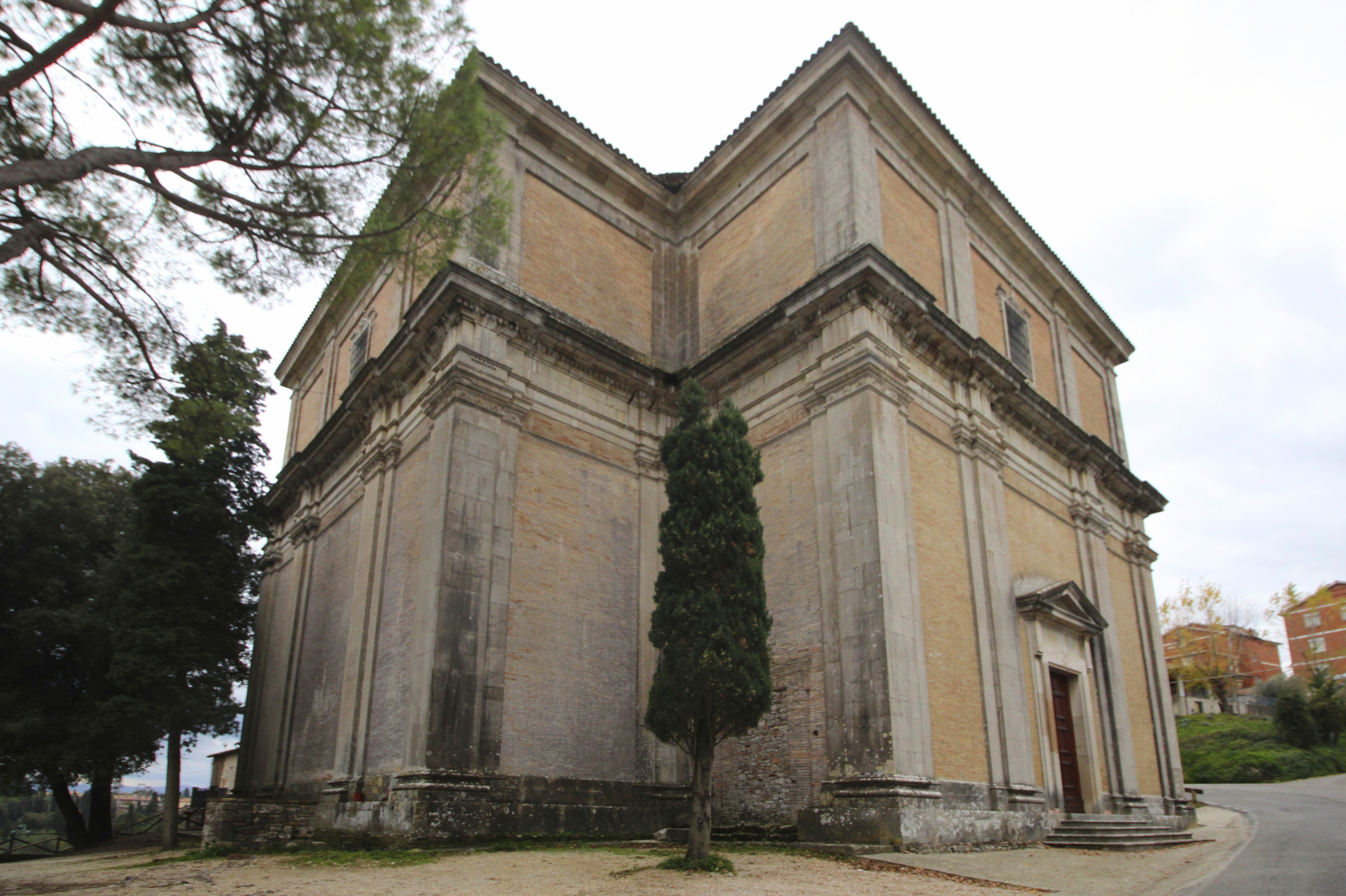
View of facade

The Tempio del Santissimo Crocifisso, also spelled as Tempio del SS Crocifisso (Temple of the Holiest Crucifix) was erected as a Renaissance-style, Roman Catholic sanctuary church on Via del Crocifisso #10, about 200 meters Northeast of the Porta Romana, just east of former medieval walls of Todi, province of Perugia, region of Umbria, Italy. It now serves as a parish church.

== History ==
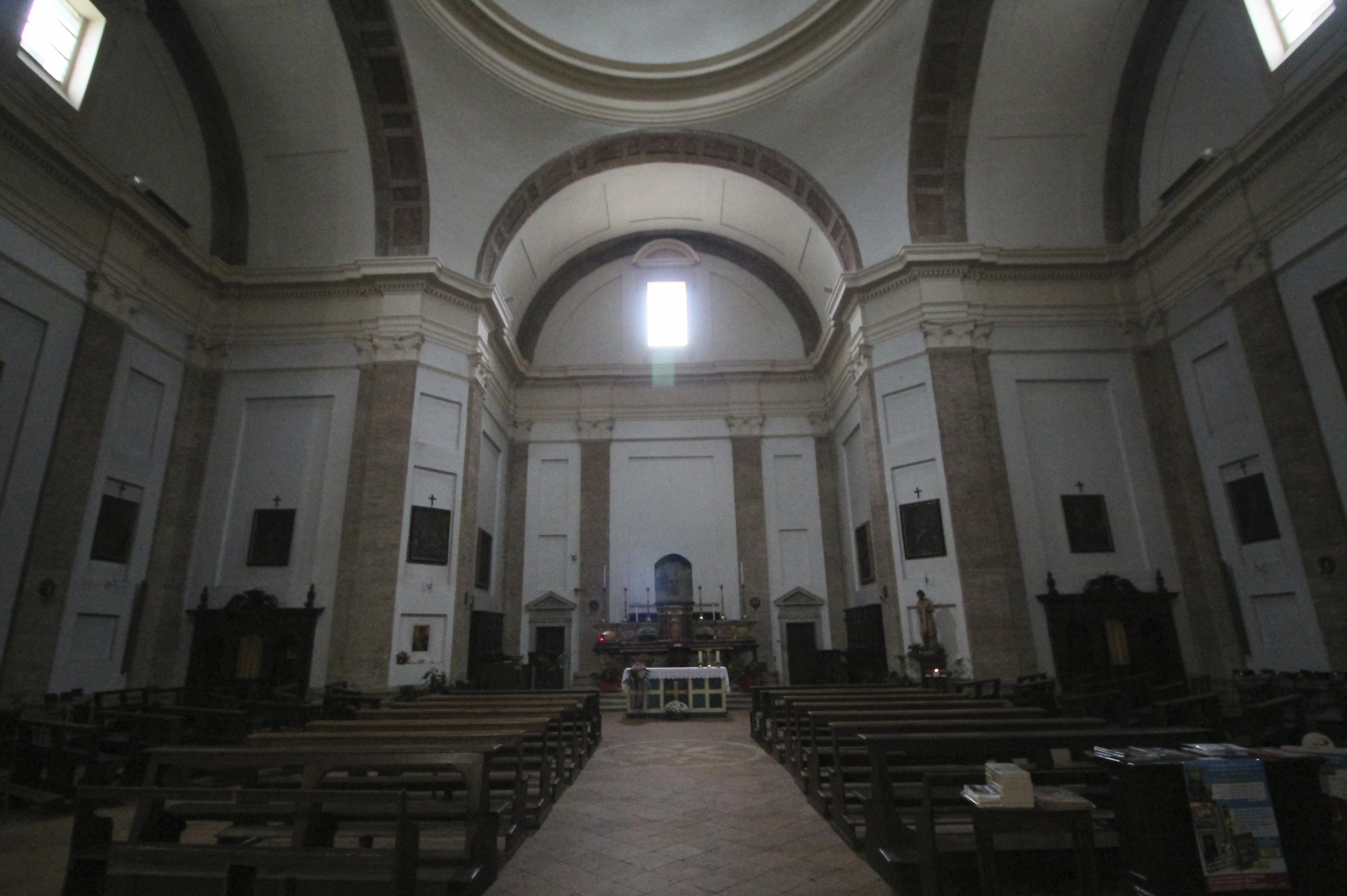
Interior of church

The church has been compared with the other architectural Renaissance jewel found on the outskirts of Todi, the Bramantesque sanctuary church of Santa Maria della Consolazione. Like many sanctuary churches, the layout is centralized, although unlike the Consolazione church, the dome of the church here has been enclosed in rectangular box-like arms. The walls are made of brick but highlighted by doric pilasters. The tall facades are nearly equivalent in all arms except for the entrance portal with a triangular pediment.

The construction of a church at the site was commissioned under Bishop Angelo Cesi in 1566. At this site there was a roadside aedicule with a 14th-century image of the Madonna known as the Maestà delle Forche (Majesty of the gallows). The site was also used for executions hence the link to a gallows. In 1566, Cesi noting the devotion to this image, decided to build the church; Cesi did not lay the first stone until 1591.

The design of this church has a complex attribution. Tradition has held that it was either by or inspired directly by a plan by Bramante, but it would have to have been a posthumous derivation since that architect died in 1514. Some have attributed the original inspiration to Bramante's famous Tempietto (1502) at San Pietro in Montorio in Rome, but while this honors the structure's centralized plan, the Tempietto has a truly circular layout unlike this rectangular church. Some have attributed the design to the architect Valentino Martelli from Perugia, but also claimed it was derivative from the models of either the other Sistine Chapel (circa 1585–1590) in Santa Maria Maggiore in Rome or the church of Santa Maria della Consolazione (1588) in Montefalco. The construction was under the direction of the Pietro Paolo Sensini of Todi, who is known to have worked with Martelli. Construction of this church continued until the early decades of the 17th-century, employing the direction of other local architects Giovanni Domenico Bianchi, and starting in 1594, Ippolito Scalza from Orvieto. By 1610, the original devotional image of the Maesta had been placed at the high altar.

However, recent scholarship has also unearthed at the library of the Accademia di San Luca in Rome, a plan of an externally quadrangular and internally hexagonal church, found in an anonymous folio belonging to the Bolognese architect Octavian Mascarino (1536–1606). The document from 1589, matches plans for this church in Todi, and has been attributed to the architect Ascanio Vitozzi of Bolsena, who designed the church of Santissima Trinità in Turin (1598).
