= Santa Maria della Consolazione, Todi =

Church building in Todi, Italy

Coordinates: 42°46′40″N 12°24′07″E

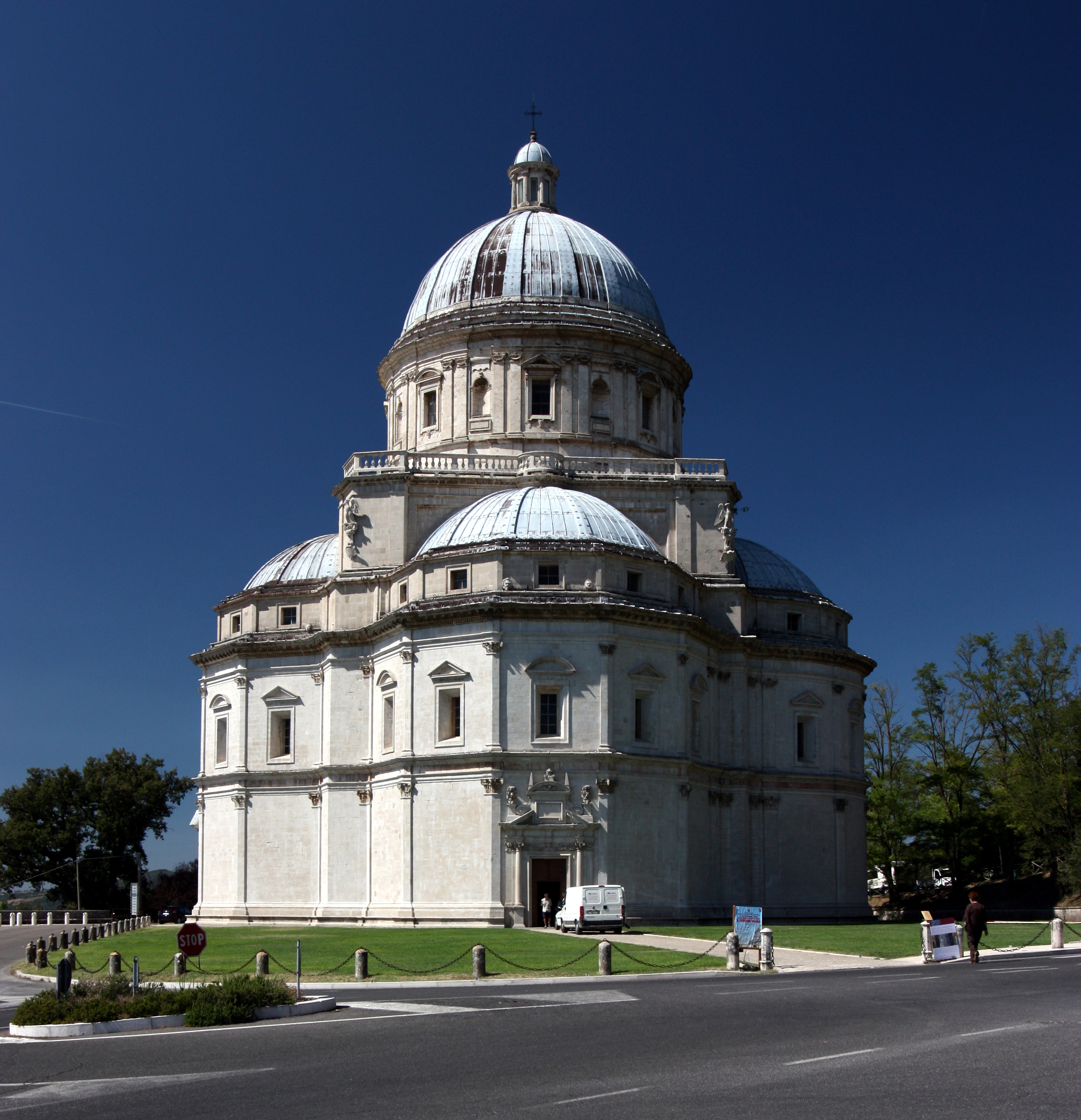
Santa Maria della Consolazione, early 16th century: the central Greek-cross plan with apsidal transepts recalls Bramante's first plans for St Peter's.

Santa Maria della Consolazione is a Renaissance-style pilgrimage church in Todi, Italy. The centralized, symmetric plan, surmounted by a tall dome, distinguishes this Renaissance church, from the more common elongated basilica or Latin-cross designs. Another Todi sanctuary church, also with a symmetric layout, is the Tempio del Santissimo Crocifisso on the eastern end of town.

== History and description ==
Originally, the site held a small chapel with an aedicule painted with an icon of the Madonna. the Legend holds that a worker, who was blind in one eye, had the sight of that eye restored when he wiped it with a cloth that had cleaned the icon. The church was built at the site where the icon had been housed, and now contains the icon at the altar.

Contributions to a confraternity assigned to the construction of the church allowed building to begin by 1508. The church was not complete until 1608 at the cost of over 34000 scudi. The original project is attributed to Donato Bramante, despite the absence of documentation.

For the first four to five years, the architect Cola da Caprarola (Cola di Matteucio) led in the initiation of the construction; it is unclear how much he contributed to the design. He was followed at the site by the builder Giovanni Domenico da Pavia in 1515. The project recruited various sculptors and craftsmen such as Ambrogio da Milano (during 1516-20); Francesco da Vita (during 1522); and Filippo di Giovanni da Melide (during 1522-38). Documents report that the project was aided in 1518 by Baldassarre Peruzzi.

In 1531, the Compagnia di Santa Maria della Consolazione who managed the site ceded the church to Hieronymite monks from a community at Fiesole. During the 16th-century, the advice of other prominent architects was sought. Antonio di Sangallo il Giovane visited in 1532. Payments were made to Giacomo Vignola in 1565; to Galeazzo Alessi in 1567; and William of Portugal in 1584; all presumably related to the design of the dome. More artisans to complete the sculptural decorations were engaged including Giovanni Battista Cardona da Ligornetto and Francesco Casella da Carona. Other architects involved in the construction were Ippolito Scalza (1584) and Valentino Martelli (1587) who were also involved with the design of the centrally planned domed Tempio del Santissimo Crocifisso on the eastern side of town. The cupola was finally closed in 1607.

The church is built in a Greek cross plan: three apses are polygonal and the one on the north side is semicircular. The apse is surmounted by a square terrace with four eagles at the corners, from which the dome rises.

In the interior, twelve niches in the first three apses house giant statues of the apostles. Also noteworthy is the wooden statue of Pope Martin I, a native of the Todi area.

== See also ==
- 16th-century Western domes

== Gallery ==
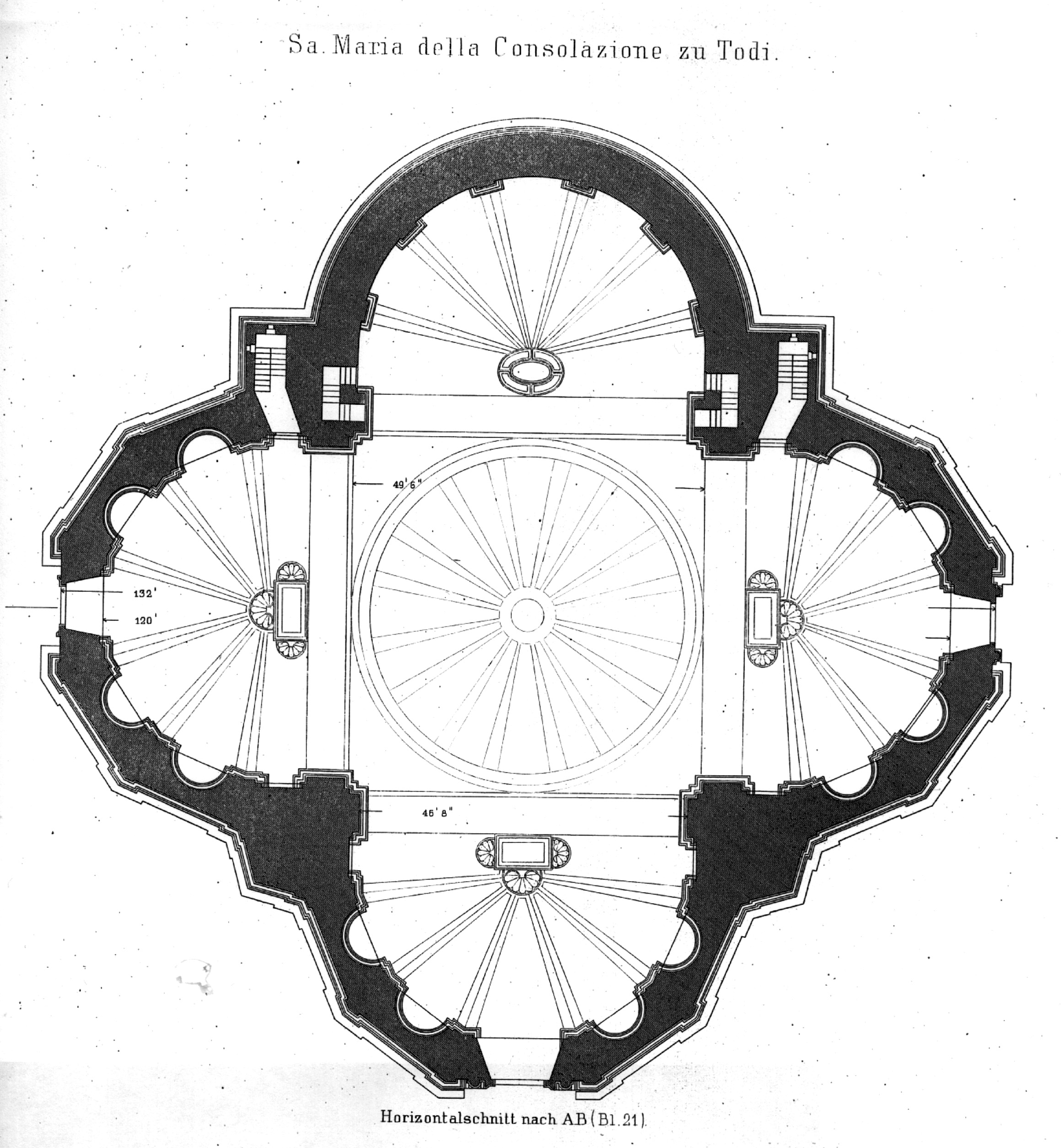
Base plan of church

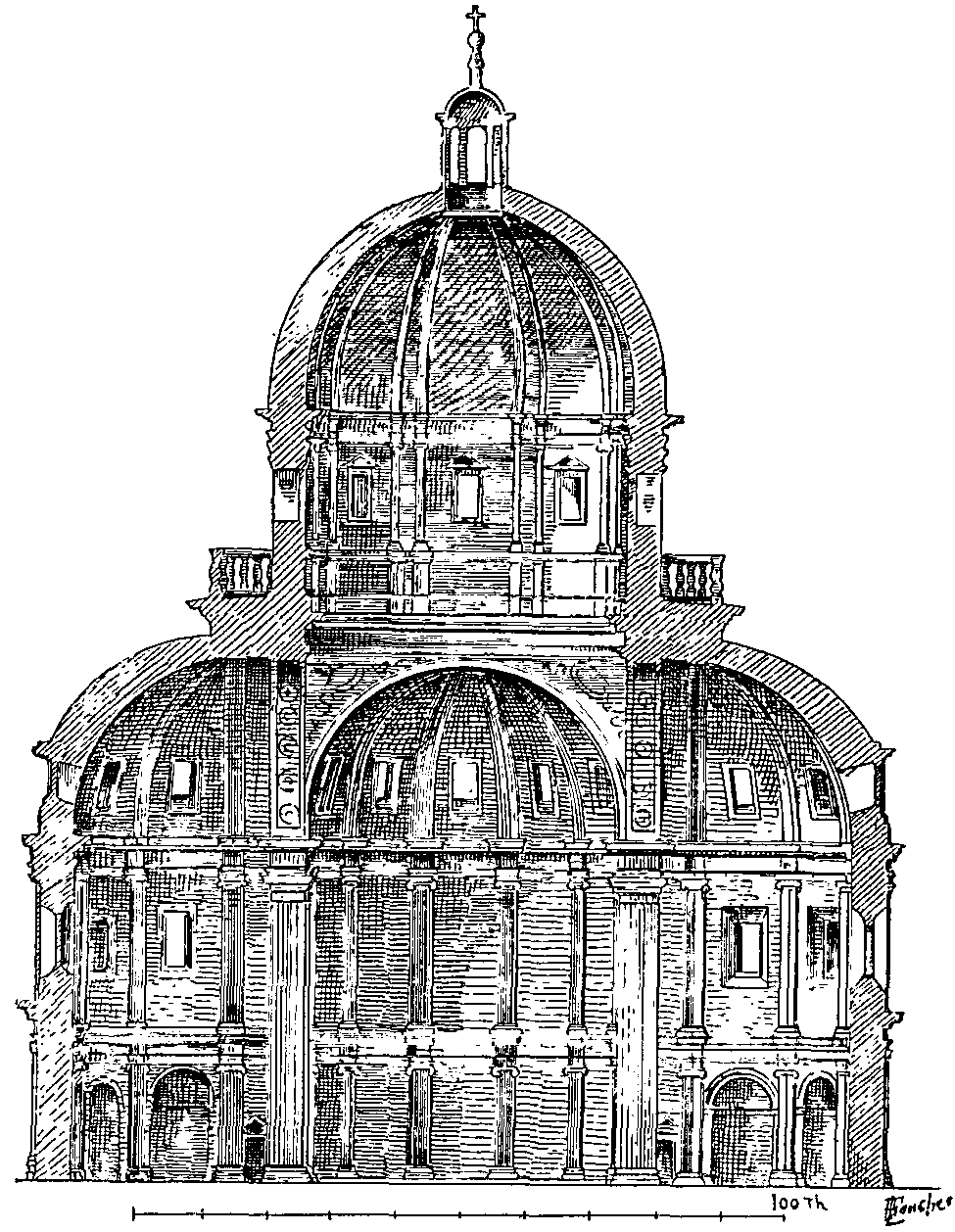
Interior plan

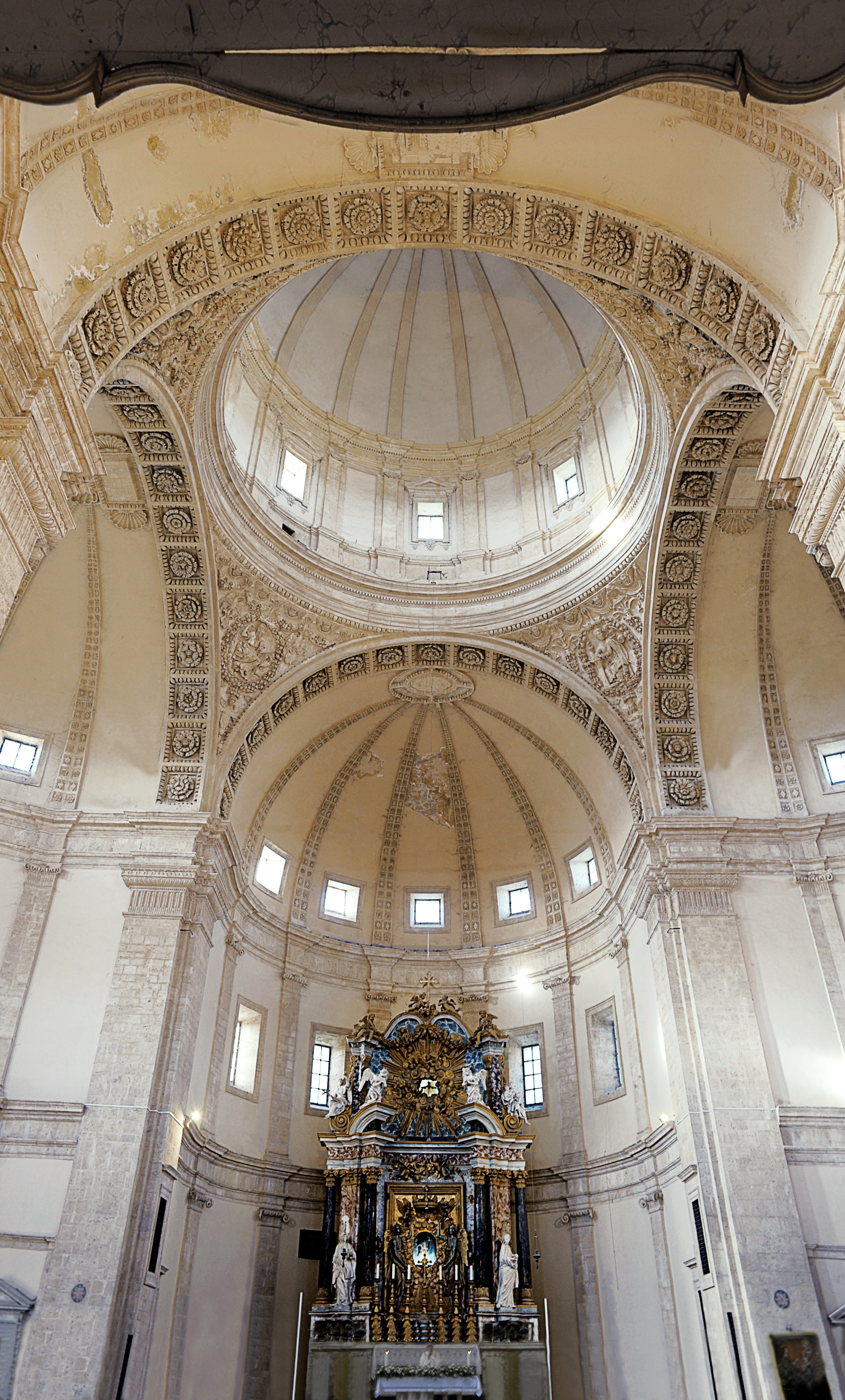
Interior

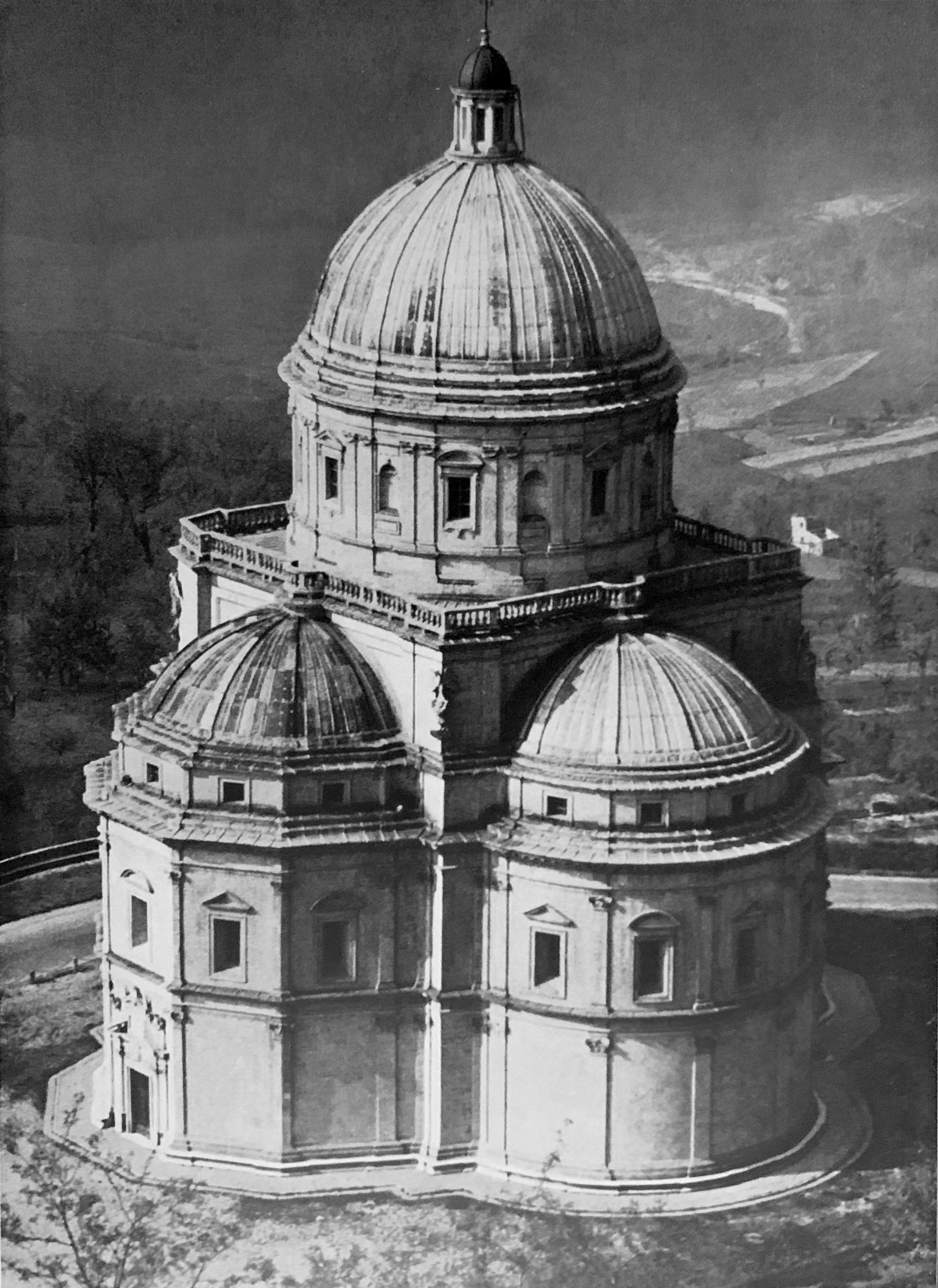
Exterior

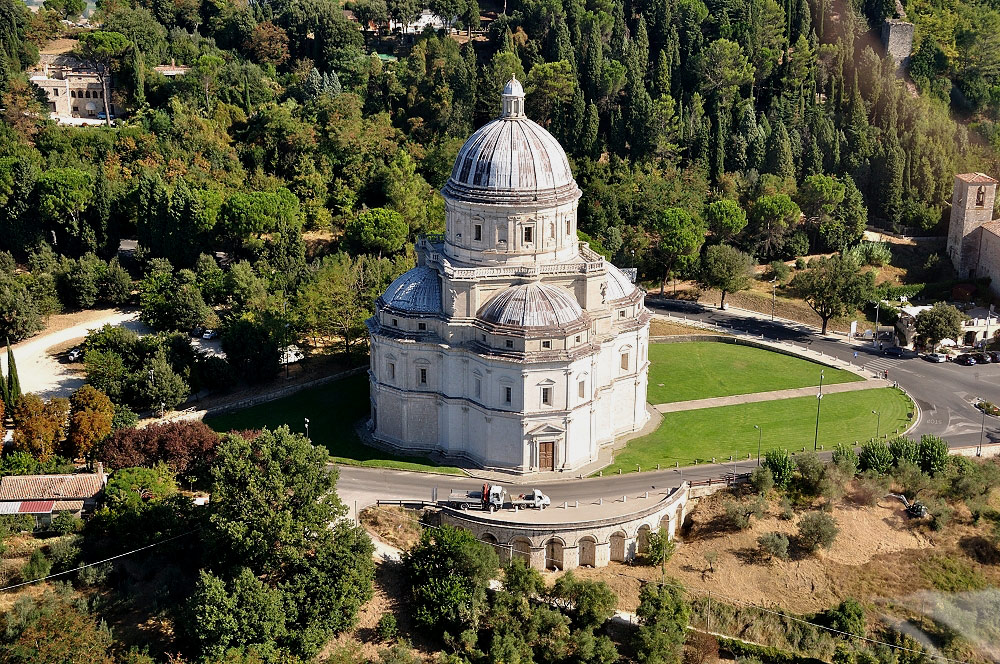
Wide shot

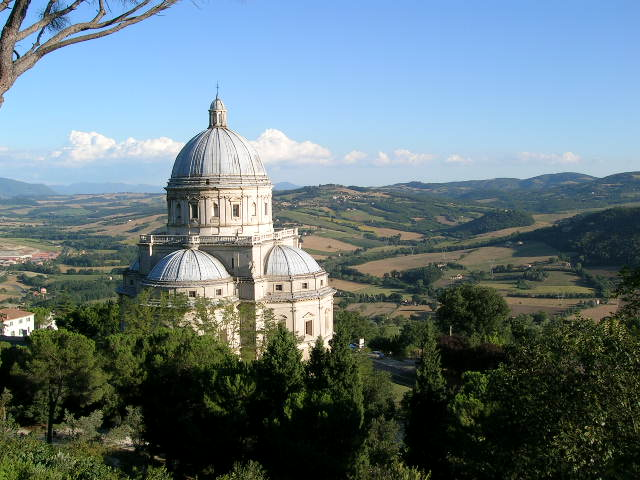
Surrounding view
