= Palazzo Soliano =

Coordinates: 42.7166°N 12.1139°E

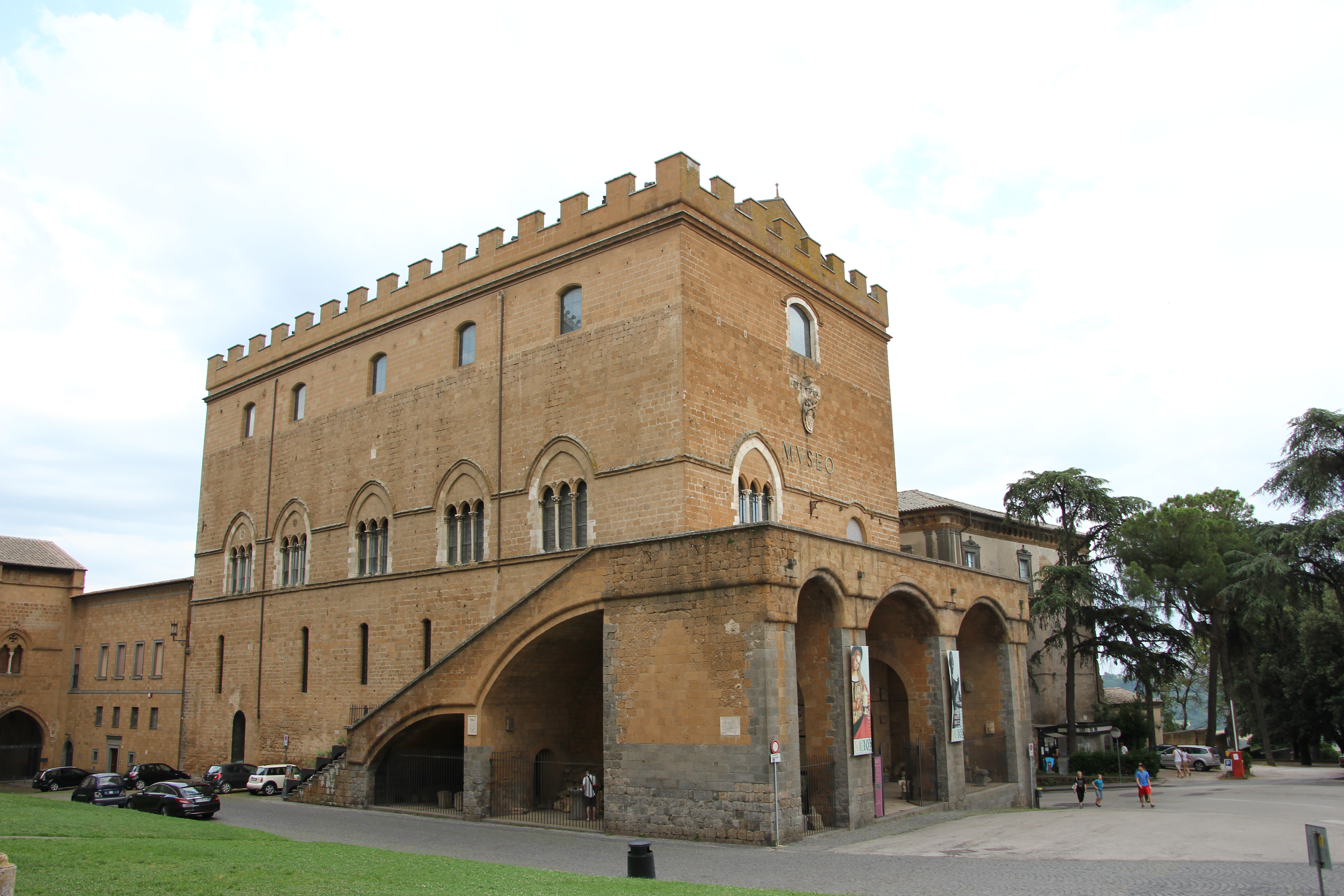
Palazzo Soliano

Palazzo Soliano, also known as the Palazzo di Papa Bonifacio VIII or Palazzo Apostolico or Palace of the Pope, is a Gothic architecture palace located on Piazza del Duomo, just east of the cathedral and across from the church of San Giacomo Maggiore, in the center of Orvieto in the region of Umbria, Italy. It now houses a modern art museum, Museo Emilio Greco, highlighting the sculptor's works.

Construction palace was begun in 1297 by Pope Boniface VIII, but work continued for decades. By 1330, the place was used as a warehouse and artisan work for the workers in the Duomo. In 1361, the building was damaged by fire. In preparation for a visit in 1493 to Orvieto by Pope Alexander VI, the external staircase leading to a loggia was built. However in 1504 a crowd gathered on the roof of the palace to watch the local horse race, caused a collapse. The ownership of the palace was transferred to the commune, which added increasing structural supports. A radical refurbishment was begun in the 19th-century by Paolo Zampi. Presently the palace sports a merlionated roofline and a piano nobile with large mullioned windows.
