= Palazzo Comunale, Orvieto =

Coordinates: 42.71833°N 12.10831°E

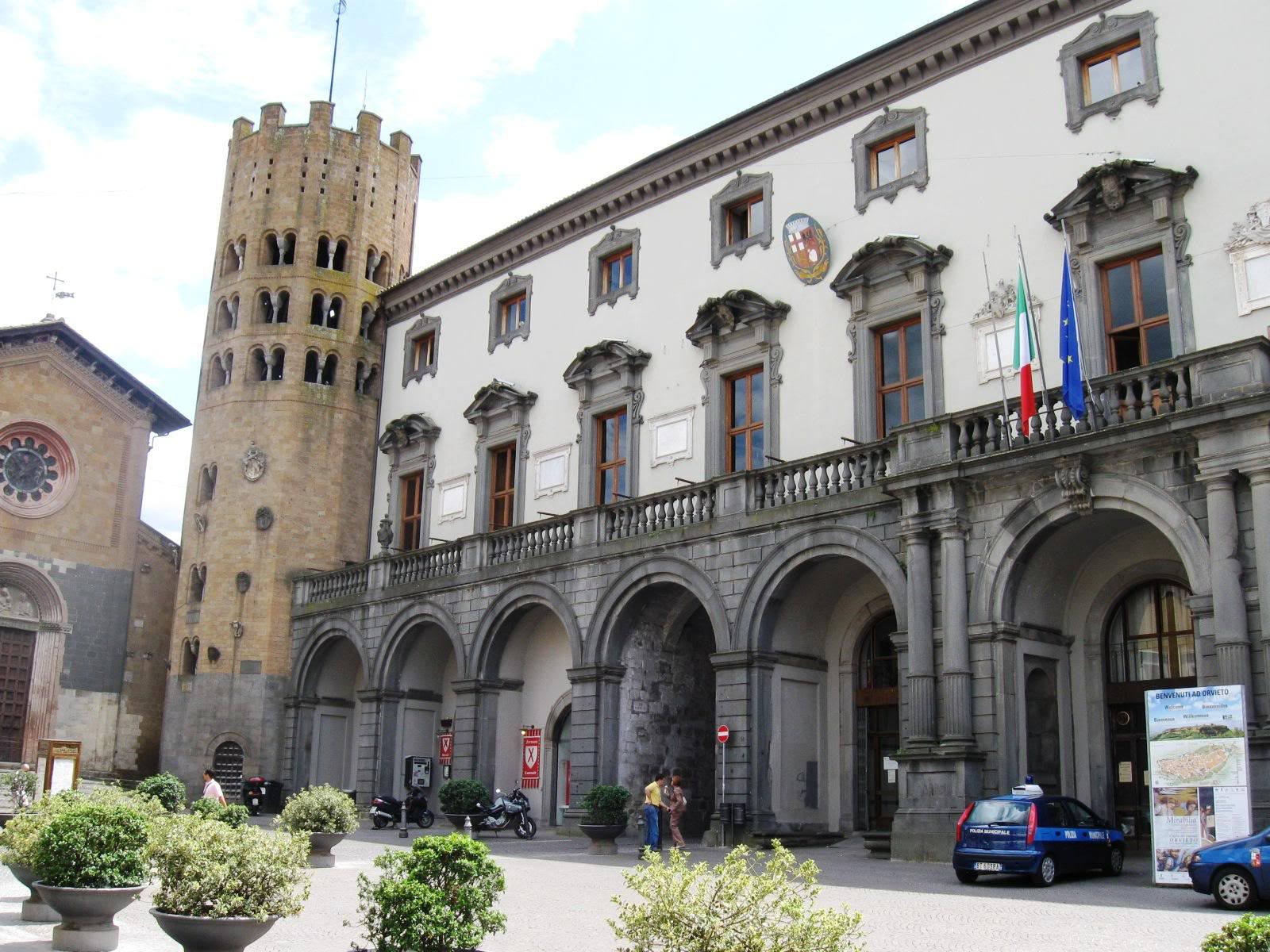
Facade of Palazzo Comunale with Sant'Andrea belltower to left

The Palazzo Comunale, also called Palazzo Municipale, is a Mannerist architecture civic palace located in Piazza della Republica, adjacent to the dodecagonal bell-tower of the church of Sant'Andrea in the historic center of Orvieto, region of Umbria, Italy. The palace houses city hall offices.

== History and description ==
The site putatively was part of the forum of the Etruscan town. A palace was erected here for meetings of the people circa 1276, but by the 16th century, plans were made for refurbishment. Pope Clement VII in 1524 granted 100 gold ducats for its reconstruction. Plans were commissioned from Ippolito Scalza. Construction was started in 1573 and completed in 1581.

The upper stories of the palace has a long balustrade on the first floor and somewhat eccentrically decorated pediments on the first floor and window-frames on the third. The base is made of heavy rounded arches with black basalt stone. The entrance portal in the second portal from the right was decorated with columns upon a plinth. On the south end of the alley emerging from under the palace is a white marble arch flanked by Corinthian columns, erected in 1842 to memorialize a visit by Pope Pius IX.

A guide to Orvieto describes the entryway to the main floor as populated with plaques memorializing events in Orvieto, including:

1. A celebratory plaque recalling a visit in 1725 of Maria Clementina Sobieska and James, Prince of Wales, referred to in the plaque as James III King of Britain. The visit was sponsored by Cardinal Gualtieri.
2. A plaque (1830) honoring Cardinal Cesare Guerrieri Gonzaga for sponsoring works in Orvieto
3. Plaques from 1209 and 1220 recalling civic regulations.

The building also once held the archives and the town jail. The interiors contain damaged 13th-century fragments of a fresco depicting Good Government.
