= Emilio Greco =

Italian sculptor (1913–1995)

- Born: 11 October 1913; Catania, Sicily, Italy
- Died: 4 April 1995 (aged 81); Rome, Italy
- Known for: sculpture

Emilio Greco (11 October 1913 – 4 April 1995) was an Italian sculptor, engraver, medallist, writer and poet. He is best known for his monumental bronze sculptures, which are located around the world in museums such as the Tate Modern (London), Hermitage (Saint Petersburg), Museu de Arte Contemporânea e Centro de Arquitetura (Lisbon), and Hawke's Bay Museum (New Zealand).

== Life ==
Laura, bronze sculpture by Emilio Greco, 1973, Hiroshima Museum of Art

Greco was born in Catania, Sicily. In his early twenties, he moved to Rome, where he was drafted into the army and served in Albania. At the end of World War II, he had a studio in Villa Massimo in 1947. In 1958, he had a solo show at the Palazzo Barberini, and in 1959 a solo show at the Stadtische Galerie, Munich. His most important exhibitions: in 1961 the Musée Rodin in Paris, and a one-man show at the Shirokjia Foundation in Tokyo; 1962 Musée d'Art Moderne, Paris; 1963 Fundação Calouste Goubelkian, Lisbon, and Palazzo delle Esposizioni, Rome; 1965 "XXIV Biennale Nazionale d'Arte" Milan; 1966 National Gallery of Victoria Melbourne and National Gallery of South Australia; 1970 Palazzo dei Diamanti, Ferrara; 1971 a one-man show at the "Italienische Kulterinstitut" in Vienna, repeated at the Musée Rodin in Paris; 1972 Gendai Chokokusenta in Osaka, then to the Modern Art Museums of Kobe, to Yamaguchi, Hiroshima, Kyoto and Mitsukoshi.

In 1991, the Museo Emilio Greco was inaugurated in Orvieto at the Palazzo Soliano. It contains his principal works. Since July 1992, the Museo Nazionale d'Abruzzo of L'Aquila has had a room dedicated to Greco. In 2013, the Estorick Collection in London, Palazzo Braschi Museum in Rome and Fondazione Carichieti in Chieti, at Palazzo de' Mayo, organised a solo exhibition to mark the centenary of Emilio Greco's birth.

Emilio Greco died in Rome, Italy.

== Works ==
Establishing an international reputation, Greco went on to exhibit extensively and also received very important commissions during his career. His notable works include Monument to Pinocchio, 1953, at Collodi, the monumental doors for Orvieto Cathedral, 1962–64, and Nereid (Crouching Figure No.4), 1973.

The drawings for his Pinocchio are in the collection of the Tate Gallery. Throughout his career, his sculptures tended to be refined, with elongated forms in the Italian Mannerist tradition. La grande bagnante ("Large Bather", 1956) won the sculpture prize at the 18th Venice Biennale. Laura, 1973, is a typical example of his mature sculpture. A major work, “Nereid”, is also on permanent public display in Carlos Place, Mayfair, London. His work was also part of the sculpture event in the art competition at the 1948 Summer Olympics.

== Literary activity ==
Greco's collection of short stories and verse, "Lo Jonio Corrusco Di Vento" with his own illustrations, was published in 1980.

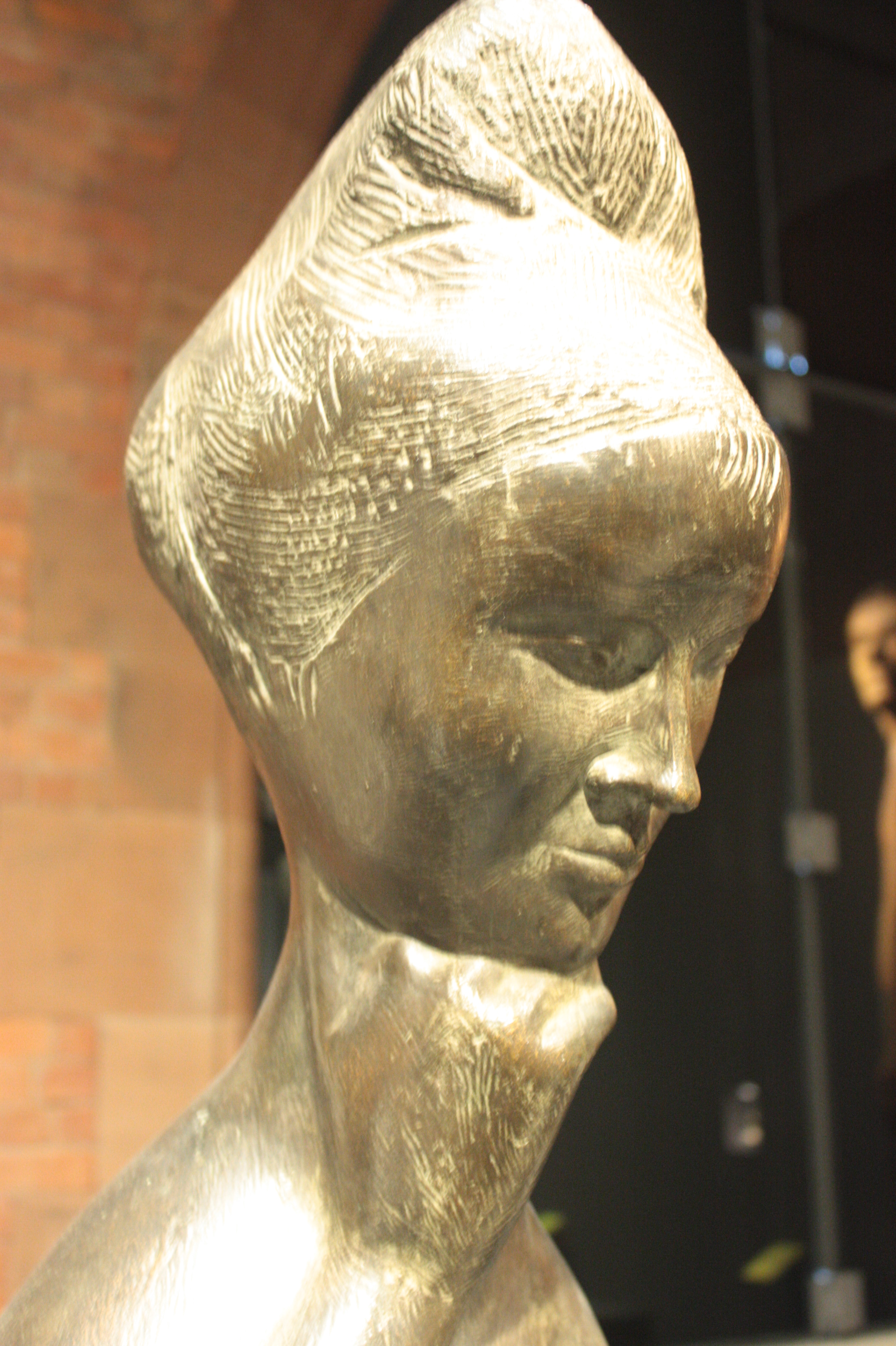
Anna by Emilio Greco, 1954, Scottish National Portrait Gallery

== Selected works ==
- Seated wrestler, 1947.
- Monument to Pinocchio, 1953.
- Anna, 1954
- Large Bather No. 1, Bronze, 1956, Tate.
- Bather No. 2, 1956–57.
- Eiko, 1968, Matsuoka Museum of Art.
- "Estrellita", Bronze, 1972, Museo Greco, Orvieto.
- Laura, Bronze, 1973, Hiroshima Museum of Art.
- Nereid (Crouching Figure No.4), 1973.
- Bullfight, 1979.
