= San Bernardino, Orvieto =

Church in Umbria, Italy

Coordinates: 42.7182°N 12.1087°E

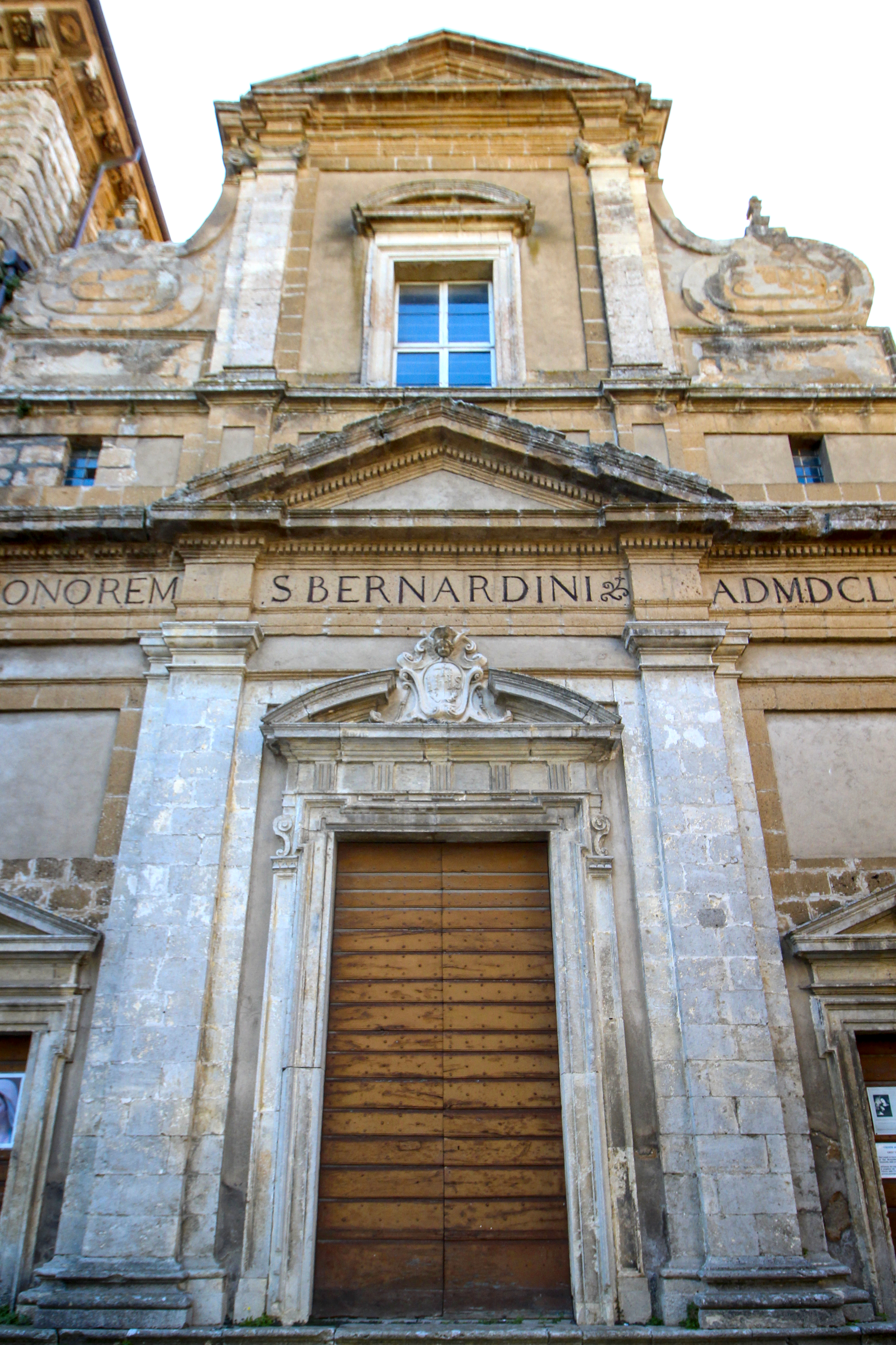
Facade of church of San Bernardino, with a fragment of Palazzo Marsciano on the left

San Bernardino is a Baroque architecture, Roman Catholic church on 8 via Soliana, corner with via Cesare Nebbia, in Orvieto, region of Umbria, Italy.

== History and description ==
In 1451, the city gave permission for a nunnery of Observant Franciscans, following rules set forth by Bernardino of Siena (1380 – 1444), who would be canonized in 1450. The nuns were under the order of the Sisters of San Bernardini of the Penitent Third Order. A monastery with an adjacent oratory was erected by 1462. In 1513, one of the main patrons being a sister of the wife of the Count of Marsciano; four nuns were brought here from Sant'Anna in Foligno. In 1544 the monastery was transferred to Poor Clares.

The church of San Bernardino was built in 1657 to a design by Cosimo Poli, nephew of Bishop Cardinal Fausto Poli. Located between the Palazzo del Conte Lodovico di Marsciano (now called Palazzo Crispo Marsciano and the monastery. The church layout is elliptical and has four side altars. The cloistered nuns choir was located at the rear of the church. The main altarpiece depicts an Enthroned Madonna and child between Saints Peter and Paul with Saints Francis and Bernardino, attributed to Sinibaldo Ibi. Near the entrance, the travertine holy water stoup is attributed to Ippolito Scalza. The first altar on the right depicts the Education of the Virgin (circa 1650) and is attributed to Giacinto Gimignani. In the presbytery are two panels depicting the Blessed Angelina of Montegiove (also known as Angeline of Marsciano), and part of the family of the Counts of Marsciano, and including Bishop Giuseppe dei Conti di Marsciano, who consecrated San Bernardino in 1739.

In 1581, the nuns sold the property to the west to Vicenzo Buzi, who built the Palazzo Buzi. They bought Palazzo Crispo Marsciano to the east in 1618. This palace subsequently passed to the Commune, and now the baroque palace houses the offices Guardia di Finanza.
