= San Francesco, Orvieto =

Church in Orvieto, Umbria, Italy

Coordinates: 42°42′58″N 12°06′40″E

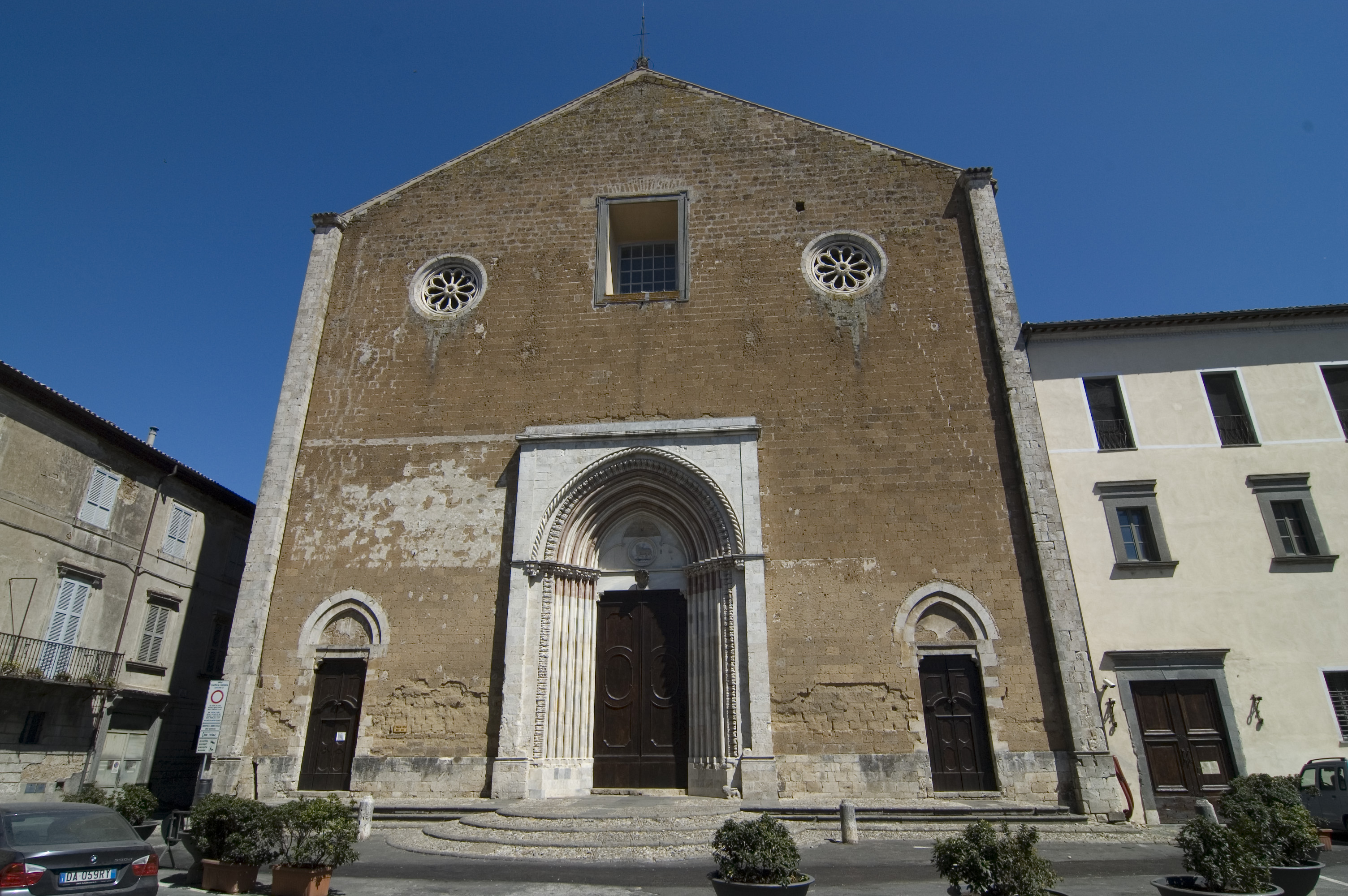
Chiesa di San Francesco

Chiesa di San Francesco is a late-Romanesque- early Gothic architecture, Roman Catholic church located on Via Ippolito Scalza in the southern ridge of the historic center of Orvieto, Umbria, Italy. It was consecrated in 1266. It belongs to the Roman Catholic Diocese of Orvieto-Todi. The adjacent monastery since 2009 is the home to the New Public Library Luigi Fumi (Nuova Biblioteca Pubblica Luigi Fumi), moved here from its previous home in piazza Febei.

== History ==
The Franciscans established a hermitage near Orvieto in the early 13th century and built the present church in 1234, replacing an older Benedictine monastery and church known as Santa Maria della Polzella. It was consecrated as Santi Francesco e Ambrogio in memory of Saint Francis and the Blessed Ambrose of Massa Maritima (died in 1240). After being enlarged in 1264, the church was consecrated simply to San Francesco in 1266 by Pope Clement IV. Until the duomo was completed in 1290, it was the largest church in Orvieto.

== Architecture ==
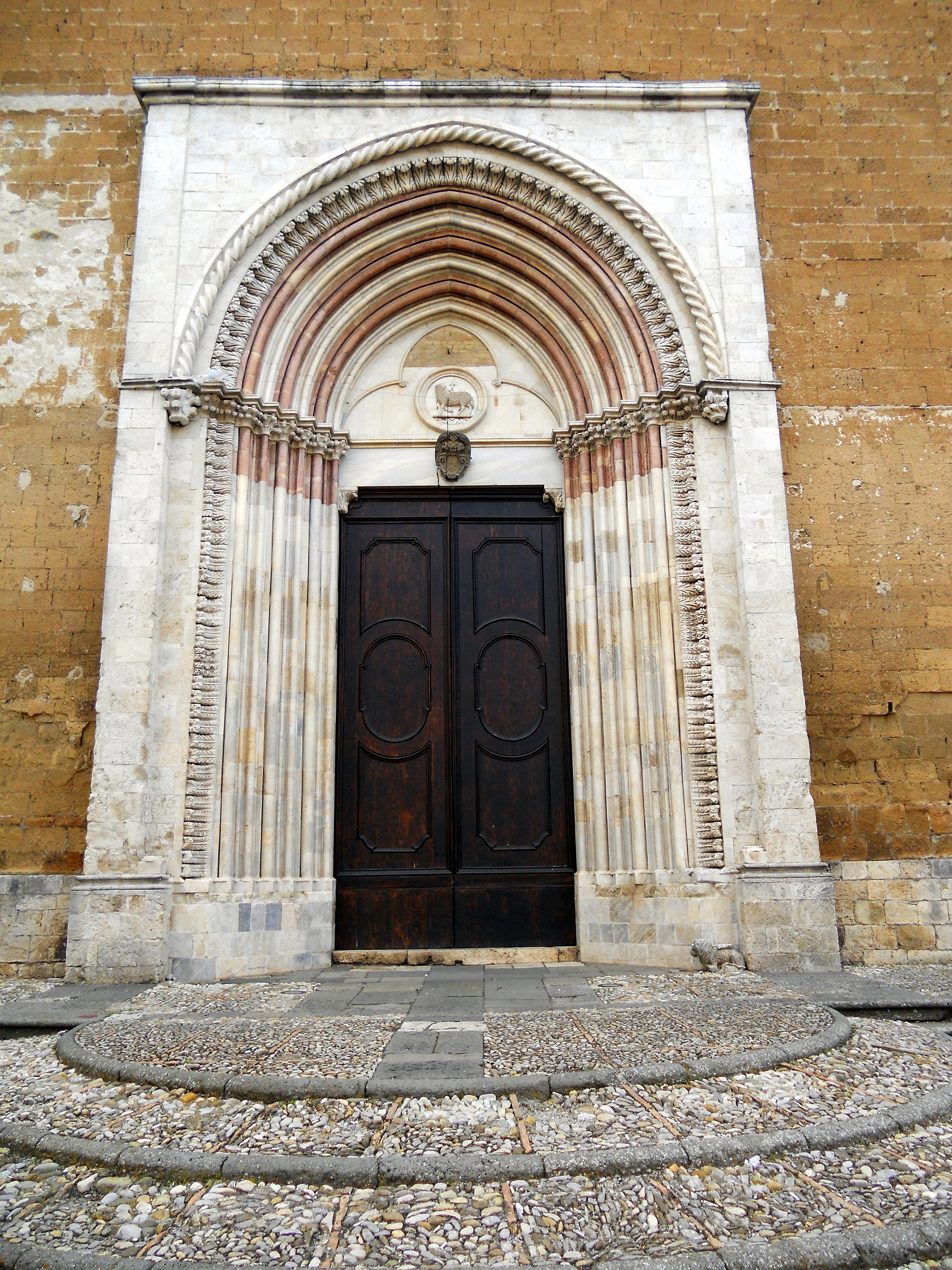
Sculpted marble portal

The building is typical of Franciscan churches of the period with a single nave, a quadrangular apse and a trussed wooden roof. At a width of 22.2 m (73 ft), the nave is wider than the common 21.10 metres. A more open look is achieved by arches which progressively project inwards. The interior was altered in the second half of the 16th century when altars were placed along the lateral walls. From 1768 to 1773, two sets of side chapels were added while the church was given a sober Baroque appearance. The dome over the transept was also added in 1773. The original facade has been heavily restored. Its high rose windows have been replaced but the sculpted marble portal, with multiple pilasters and ogival arch, survives intact.

== Interior and furnishings ==
The interior originally took the form of a hall church but was redesigned in 1773 when colonnades were added to provide for side chapels. The damaged statues of Pope Boniface VIII in the left aisle date from 1297. The wooden crucifix above the altar is thought to be the work of Lorenzo Maitani (c. 1320). The three 16th-century altarpieces in the chapels are attributed to Cesare Nebbia. They depict the Immaculate Conception (1584), the Madonna and Child, and Christ in Judgment. In the chapel to the left of the presbytery, a series of frescos was discovered during restoration work in 1999. Attributed to Pietro di Puccio, they depict scenes from the life of St Matthew.
