= Corporal of Bolsena =

Eucharistic miracle in Roman Catholicism

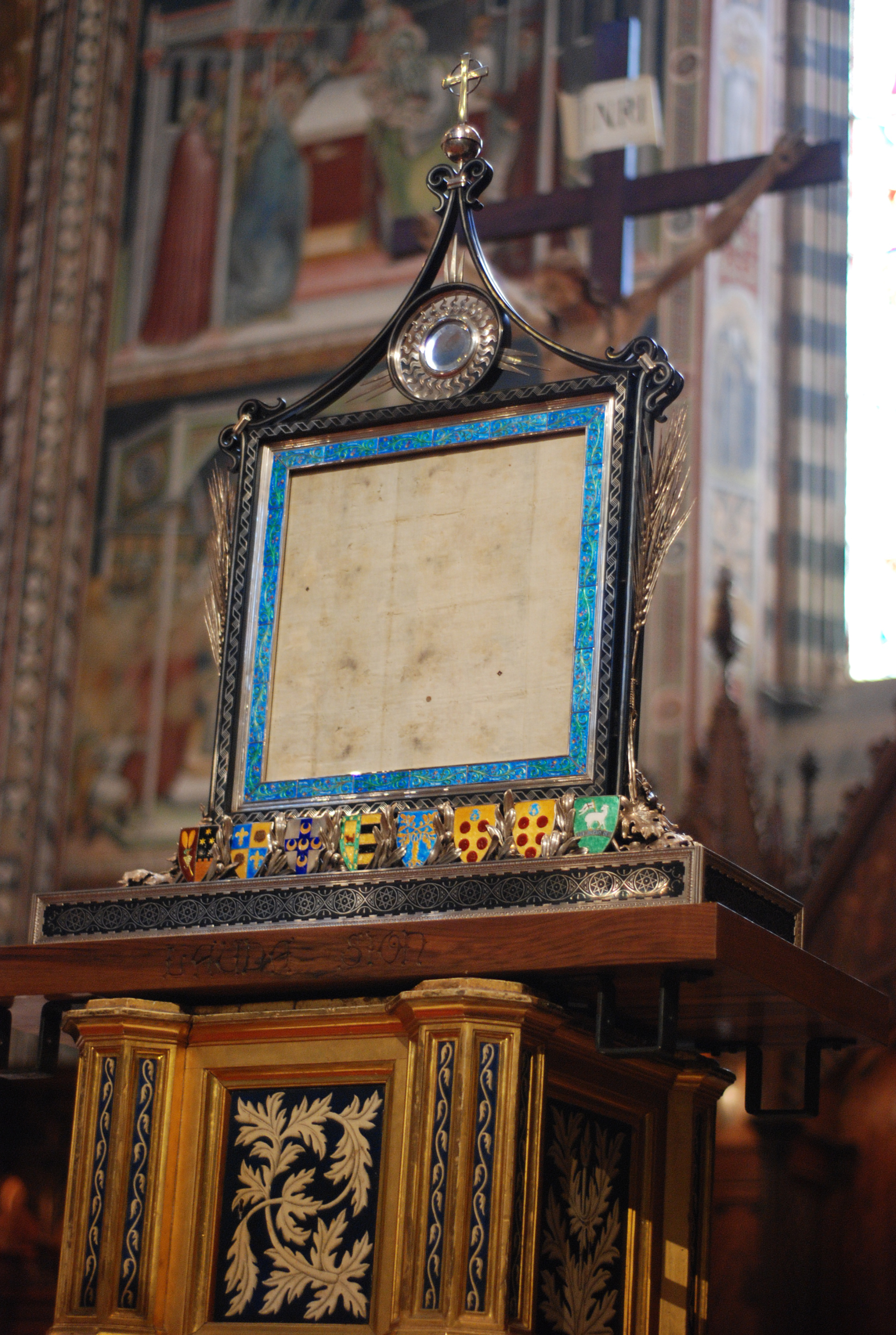
This is the blood-stained linen corporal brought to Orvieto from Bolsena.

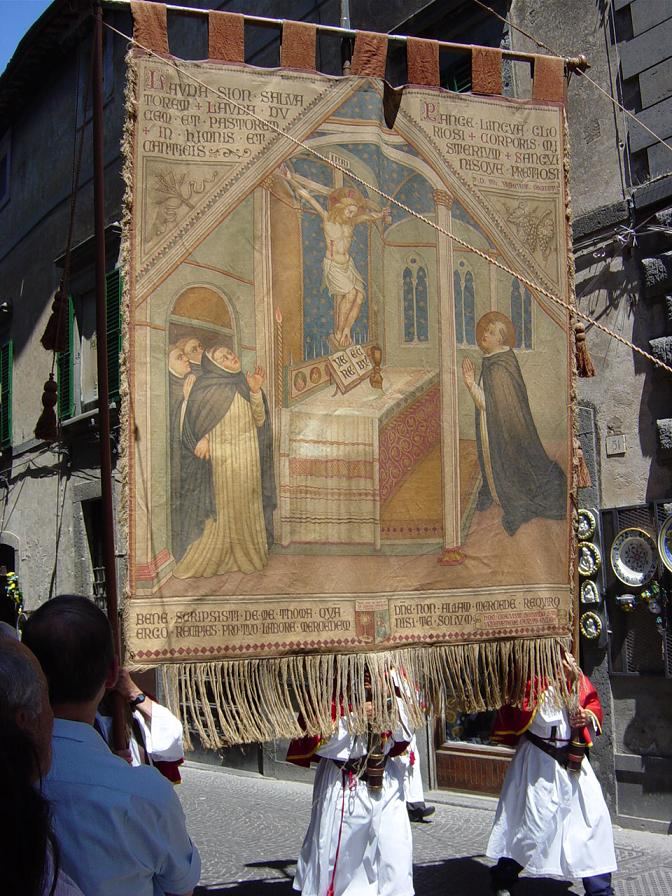
A tapestry depicting the Miracle of Bolsena as part of the Corpus Christi procession in Orvieto

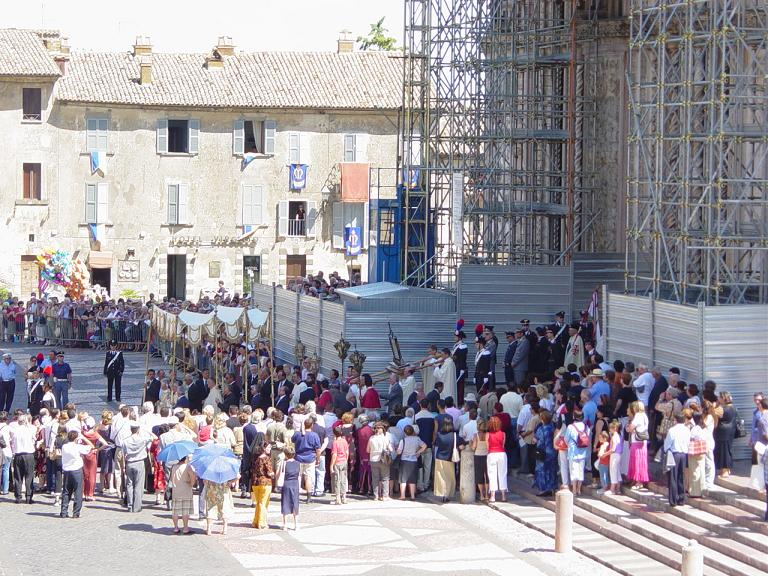
The Corporal of Bolsena processing out of Orvieto's Duomo as part of Corpus Christi celebrations

The Corporal of Bolsena dates from a Eucharistic miracle in Bolsena, Italy, in 1263 when a consecrated host began to bleed onto a corporal, the small cloth upon which the host and chalice rest during the Canon of the Mass. The appearance of blood was seen as a miracle to affirm the Roman Catholic doctrine of transubstantiation, which states that the bread and wine become the Body and Blood of Christ at the moment of consecration during the Mass. Today, the Corporal of Bolsena is preserved in a rich reliquary at Orvieto in the cathedral. The reddish spots on the cloth, upon close observation, show the profile of a face similar to those that traditionally represent Jesus Christ. It is said that the miraculous bleeding of the host occurred in the hands of an officiating priest who had doubts about transubstantiation, Peter of Prague. The "Miracle of Bolsena" is regarded by the Roman Catholic Church as a private revelation, meaning that Catholics are under no obligation to believe it although they may do so freely.

Pope Urban IV makes no mention of it in the bull by which he established the feast of Corpus Christi, although the legend of the miracle is set in his lifetime and is claimed by its partisans to have determined him in his purpose of establishing the feast. The contemporary biographers of Urban are silent: Muratori, Rerum Italicarum scriptores, (vol. III, pt. l, 400ff) and Thierricus Vallicoloris, who, in his life of the pope in Latin verse, describes in detail all the events of the pontiff's stay at Orvieto, referring elsewhere also to the devotion of Urban in celebrating the Mass, and to the institution of the Feast of Corpus Christi, without at any time making allusion to a miracle at Bolsena.

The miracle of Bolsena is related in the inscription on a slab of red marble in the church of St Christina, and is of later date than the canonization of St. Thomas Aquinas (1323). The oldest record of the miracle is in the enamel representations of it that adorn the front of the reliquary made by Sienese goldsmith Ugolino di Vieri in 1337–1338.

In 1344 Clement VI, referring to this matter in a brief, uses only the words propter miraculum aliquod ("on account of some miracle") (Pennazzi, 367); Gregory XI, in a brief of 25 June 1377, gives a short account of the miracle; and abundant reference to it is found later (1435), in the sermons of the Dominican preacher Leonardo Mattei of Udine ("In festo Corp. Christi", xiv, ed. Venice, 1652, 59) and by Antoninus of Florence (Chronica, III, 19, xiii, 1), the latter, however, does not say (as the local legend claims) that the priest doubted the Real Presence of Christ in the Holy Eucharist, but, merely that a few drops from the chalice fell upon the corporal. For the rest, similar legends of the "blood-stained corporal" are quite frequent in the legend collections of even earlier date than the fourteenth century, and coincide with the great Eucharistic polemics of the ninth to the twelfth centuries. Historians such as Marc Venard observe that the purported 1263 events at Bolsena, occurred during a wider 13th century shift in Western Catholicism, where devotion of physical blood relics and bleeding hosts increased as the Latin Church removed the use of lay communion from the chalice.

The Feast of Corpus Christi is one of the major public holidays for the city of Orvieto, during which the Corporal of Bolsena is paraded around the city with much fanfare.

The left half of a large fresco in the Apostolic Room of the Vatican Palace, titled The Mass at Bolsena, was painted by the Renaissance painter Raphael.

== Observations of the phenomenon ==
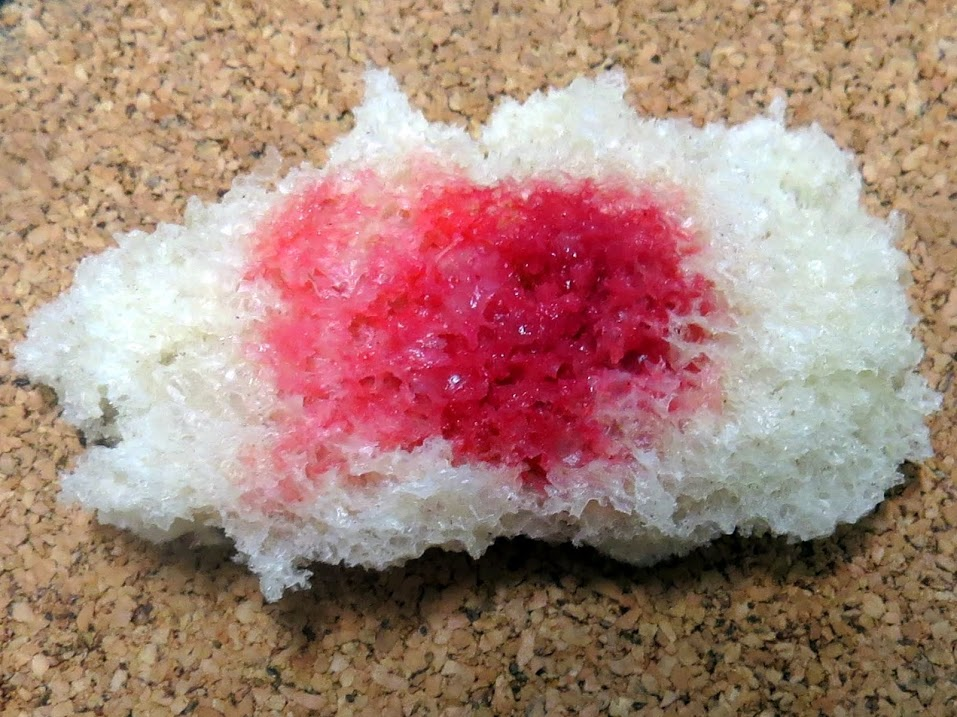
"Bloody bread": S. marcescens growing on bread

In 1819, Bartolomeo Bizio established the first scientific connection between "bleeding" starchy foods and the prevalence of red-pigmented bacterium, specifically referencing the events at Bolsena. Anatole France, in his 1984 work Le Jardin d’Épicure, observed:

The miracle of Bolsena is familiar to everybody, immortalized as it is in one of Raphael's Stanze at the Vatican. A skeptical priest was celebrating mass; the host, when he broke it for Communion, appeared bespattered with blood. It is only within the last ten years that the Academies of Science would not have been sorely puzzled to explain so strange a phenomenon. Now no one thinks of denying it, since the discovery of a microscopic fungus, the spores of which having germinated in the meal or dough, offer the appearance of clotted blood. The naturalist who first found it, rightly thinking that here were the red blotches on the wafer in the Bolsena miracle, named the fungus micrococcus prodigiosus.

Microbiologist Eugene R. Gaughran's in 1969 and epidemiologist Victor L. Yu in 1971, have both tracked the historical occurrences of the microbe that masquerades as blood on food substances, citing the 1263 event at Bolsena as a prime medieval example. Alongside other host miracle claims, they are seen as probable cases of S. marcescens contamination.

In 1999, Luigi Garlaschelli investigated the biological mechanisms that can cause communion wafers to appear as if they are bleeding as claimed in Bolsena. He highlighted that the phenomenon can be easily replicated in modern laboratories by inoculating Eucharist hosts with S.marcescens and keeping them in warm and damp conditions, after 24 to 48 hours the characteristic blood-red stain reliably developed. This was already previously done in 1994 by Johanna C. Cullen a researcher at Georgetown University in Washington, who similarly reproduced the alleged miracle in a lab.

Because of its red pigmentation, caused by expression of the dye prodigiosin, and its ability to grow on bread, S. marcescens has been proposed by Ronald Bentley and J.W. Bennett as a naturalistic explanation of medieval accounts of the seemingly miraculous appearance of blood on the Corporal of Bolsena. Bentley and Bennet had also managed to repeat the experiments achieving the same results as with prior investigations. In 2015 during a conservation study of the Corporal led by textile conservator Ester Giovacchini, UV florescence photography was used to map the relic. Giovacchini reported that the UV imaging highlighted biological deposits consistent with blood that has split into plasma and serum, reproduced by transmission in a specular and symmetrical way respecting the original fabrics folds.
