= Petruccioli =

Petruccioli is an Italian surname. Notable people with the surname include:

- Claudio Petruccioli (born 1941), Italian politician and journalist
- Cola Petruccioli (1360–1401), Italian painter
