= Pietro Parenzo =

Italian Roman Catholic saint

Pietro Parenzo was a mayor (Italian: podestà) of the Italian Comune of Orvieto during the 12th century. He was assassinated in 1199 by the adherents of Catharism and became honored as a saint and wonderworker after his death. He is the patron saint of the city of Orvieto.

== Life ==
During the late 12th century, the Orvietan bishopric underwent an economic crisis that resulted from the burden of defending the vast possessions it had amassed during the previous half century. Around that time, the Cathar heresy appeared in the city. It was also a city seriously divided by the conflict between the Guelphs and Ghibellines. This situation prompted the papacy to support the bishopric more actively.

To help re-establish civil order, Pope Innocent III chose Pietro Parenzo, a member of a noble Roman family, to take charge of the city. He had been born in Rome, the son of Lord Giovanni Paranzo and his wife, Odolina, at an unknown date. His father had served as a Senator in 1157 and later as a judge in the city in 1162. Little else is known of his earlier life, other than he was a man who had gained great respect in the city, and had a wife.

Paranzo arrived in the city in February 1199, having the support of the Catholics in the city, despite their long tradition of independence. He immediately established a strict regime to take control of the civil situation. He returned to Rome for Easter of that year, to consult with Pope Innocent regarding his method of ruling. Having received the blessing and support of the pope, he returned to Orvieto.

On the night of the following 20 May, the Cathars, who had continued to resist his authority, were able to infiltrate the mayoral palace and seized Paranzo. They took him as their prisoner and fled to the surrounding countryside. They then demanded that he end the laws he had put into effect. When he refused, they beat him to death.

Paranzo's body was discovered after daybreak and brought back to the city. The civil authorities and bishop, along with the clergy, honored him as a martyr for the faith, and escorted his body for burial in the Church of St. Mary. He was later buried in the Cathedral of Orvieto.

== Veneration ==
After Paranzo's death, people began to visit his tomb and to request his intercession in their needs. Soon he gained a reputation as a wonderworker, from the large number of prayers which were answered. He was soon honored as a saint by the local bishop, with his cultus spreading to Arezzo and Florence. Pilgrimages were made from his native city of Rome to his tomb, seeking his intercession.

The papacy, however, never recognized him as a saint, until, at the request of the Bishop of Orvieto, his veneration was confirmed by Pope Leo XIII on 16 March 1879. His feast day is celebrated on 21 May.

== Sources ==
- Antonio Stefano Cartari, Istoria antica latina, e sua traduttione in lingua italiana; del martirio di S. Pietro di Parenzo, podesta, e rettore della citta d'Oruieto, seguito nell'istessa citta l'anno 1199, Orvieto, Palmiero Giannotti, 1662 (Internet Archive).
- Vincenzo Natalini, San Pietro Parenzo: la leggenda scritta dal maestro Giovanni canonico di Orvieto, Facultas theologica Pontificii athenaei seminarii romani, Rome, 1936.
- Acta Sanctorum, May, V, p. 86-89.
- O'Neel, Brian. Saint Who?: 39 Holy Unknowns. Servant Books. ISBN 978-1-61636-242-3.
