= Reliquary of the Santo Corporale =

14th-century artwork by Ugolino di Vieri

- Reliquiario del Corporale di Bolsena (Italian)
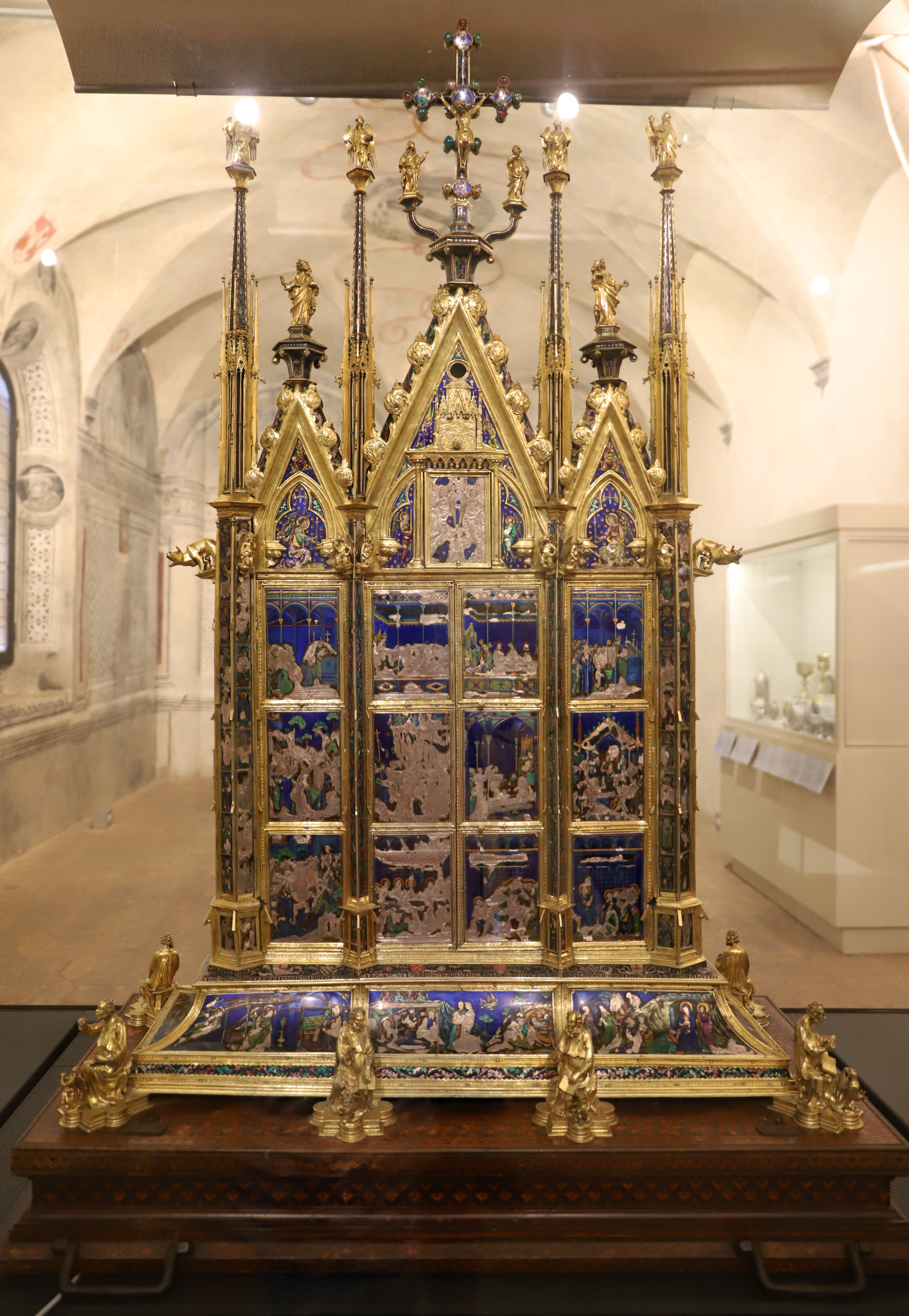
- Artist: Ugolino di Vieri
- Medium: Gold-plated silver, enamel, semi-precious stones
- Movement: Sienese School
- Dimensions: 139 cm (55 in)
- Location: Museo dell'Opera del Duomo, Orvieto; 42.7171217°N 12.1119548°E

The Reliquary of the Santo Corporale (Holy Corporal) of Bolsena is a medieval artwork made by Sienese goldsmith Ugolino di Vieri in 1337-1338. The reliquary is made of gold-plated silver and enamel and is c.139 cm high. The reliquary was recently transferred to the Museo dell'Opera del Duomo di Orvieto (MODO or Museum of the Works of the Cathedral) from the Cathedral of Orvieto itself where it had been from the time of its creation.

== Description ==
The reliquary of the Santo Corporale is considered to be one of the most important 14th century metal works from Siena. It is a gothic miniature inspired by northern European models showing the facade of the Orvieto Cathedral. The reliquary contains three vertical sections like the cathedral facade, but its typanum are much more acute. In addition, it contains a series of pinnacles surmounted by golden statues; this indicates a northern European influence as these details are generally not part of Italian architecture. Such influences from north of the Alps can frequently be seen in Italian gold and silver work of this era. Additional statues can be found at the base of the reliquary and on top is a jeweled cross.

The reliquary is considered to be important artistically also because it contains the earliest extant painted translucent enamels. Thirty-two scenes in painted enamels represent the Stories of the Corporal and the Passion of Christ, created with a very contemporary style. Elaborate architectural sections, moving gothic lines, and great attention to fine detail show a strong affinity to panel painting of the era, including to artists like Simone Martini as well as the contemporary artists Pietro and Ambrogio Lorenzetti. With a taste even more markedly gothic it is a fundamental example of pictorial art of the Sienese school. Blue is the dominant background color from which stand out points of brilliant yellow, green, and red which render the scenes perfectly legibile.

The reliquary was created to house a linen liturgical cloth, a corporal, onto which appeared the blood of Christ from a consecrated host, and it was designed to house also the host itself. This event is reported to have occurred during a Mass celebrated in Bolsena by a skeptical Bohemian priest in late 1263 or 1264.

== Image gallery ==
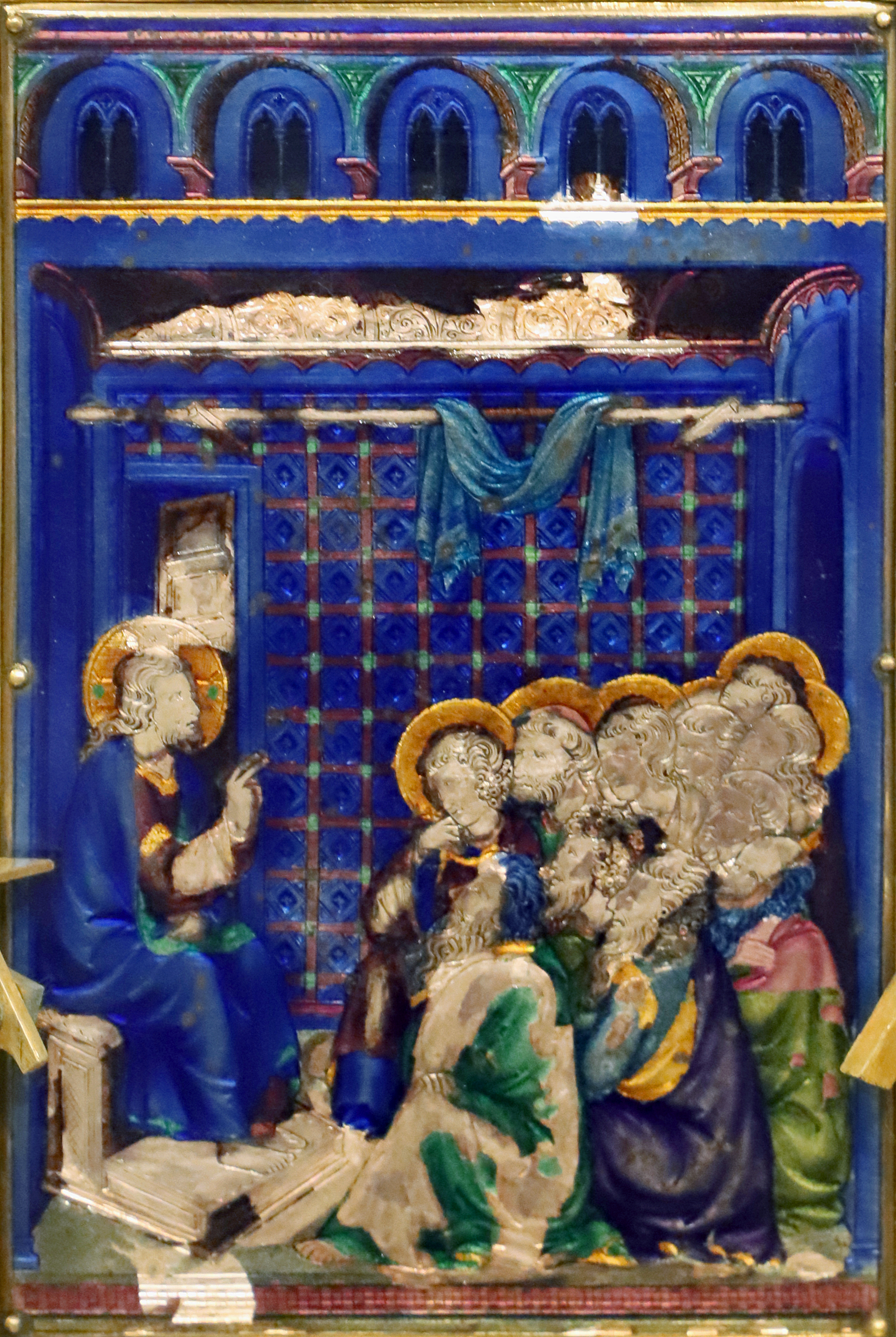
Christ teaching the apostles

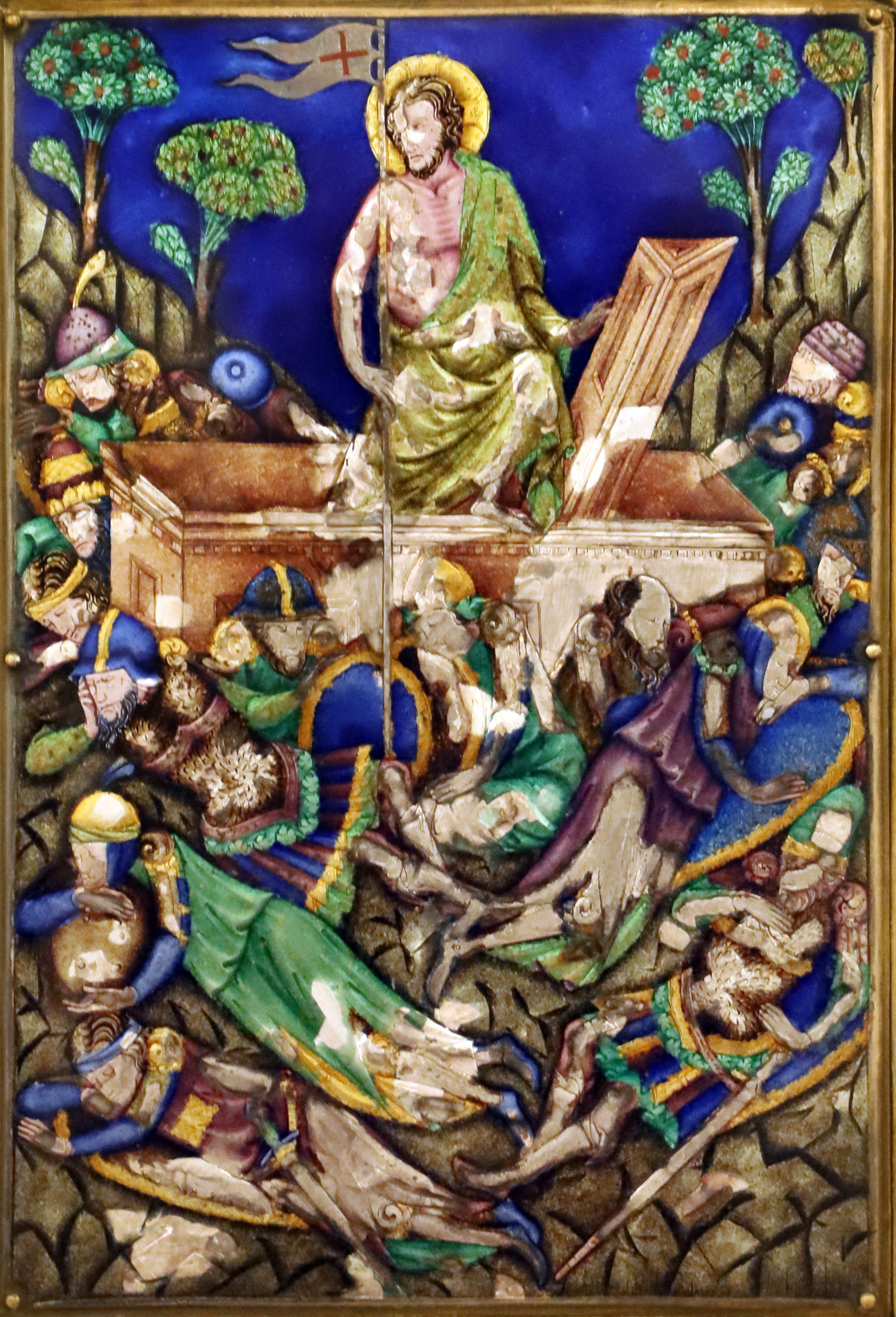
Resurrection

== Bibliography ==
- P. Dal Poggetto, Ugolino di Vieri: gli smalti di Orvieto, Firenze 1965.

== Related links ==
- Sienese School
- Corporal of Bolsena
- Duomo di Orvieto
