= Lorenzo Maitani =

Italian architect and sculptor

- Born: c. 1275
- Died: 1330 (aged 54–55)
- Known for: architecture sculpture
- Notable work: Orvieto Cathedral

Lorenzo Maitani (c. 1275–1330) was the Italian architect and sculptor primarily responsible for the construction and decoration of the façade of Orvieto Cathedral.

Maitani established his reputation in Siena and was called to supervise the construction at Orvieto in 1308 when the height and span of the cathedral's vaults and arches raised problems. In 1310 he received the title capomaestro of the cathedral and also became overseer of bridges and civic buildings.

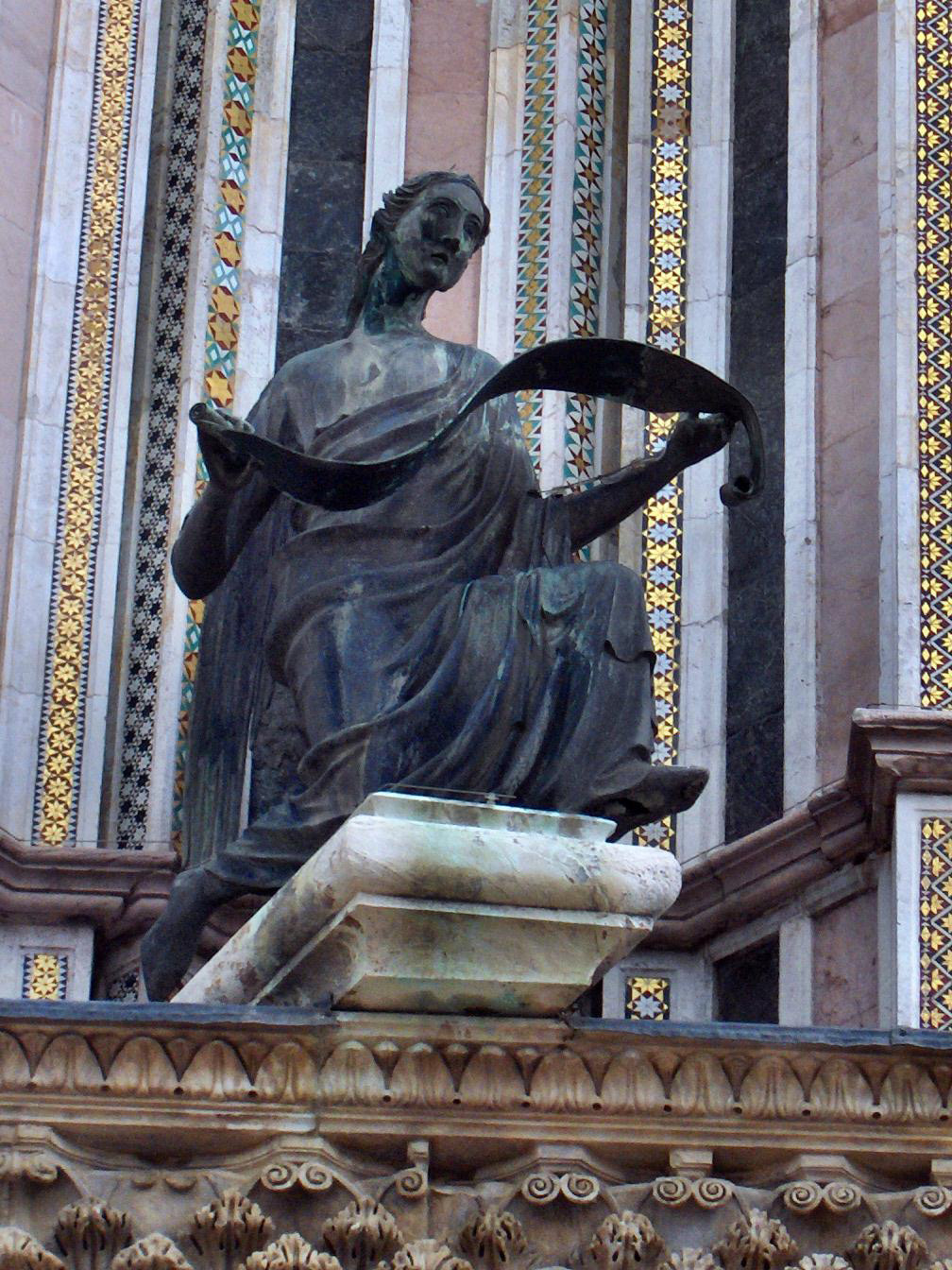
Matthew the Evangelist bronze statue on the left pier of the façade of the Orvieto Cathedral, Italy

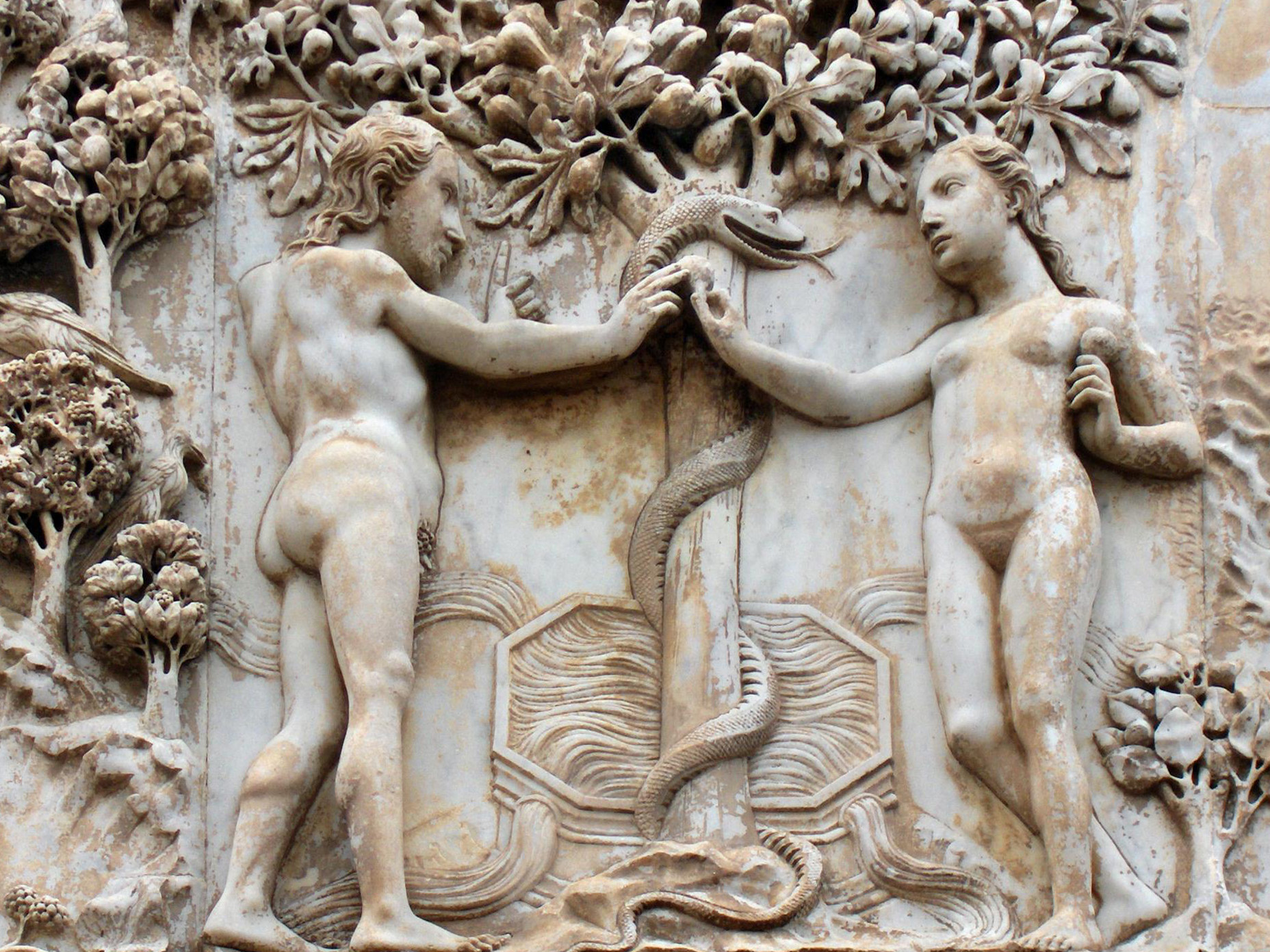
Adam and Eve, the original sin marble relief on the Orvieto Cathedral, Italy

The design of the cathedral's façade is considered to be Maitani's most important work. It is difficult to determine his contributions to the façade as a sculptor. It has been assumed that he influenced the overall design. Two of the panels attributed to Maitani, "Scenes from Genesis" and "The Last Judgment," are delicate bas-reliefs joined by an ascending vine that suggests a French Gothic influence. Sculptures generally attributed to Maitani include the bronze "Eagle of St. John" and the "Angel of St. Matthew."
