= Ugolino di Prete Ilario =

Italian painter

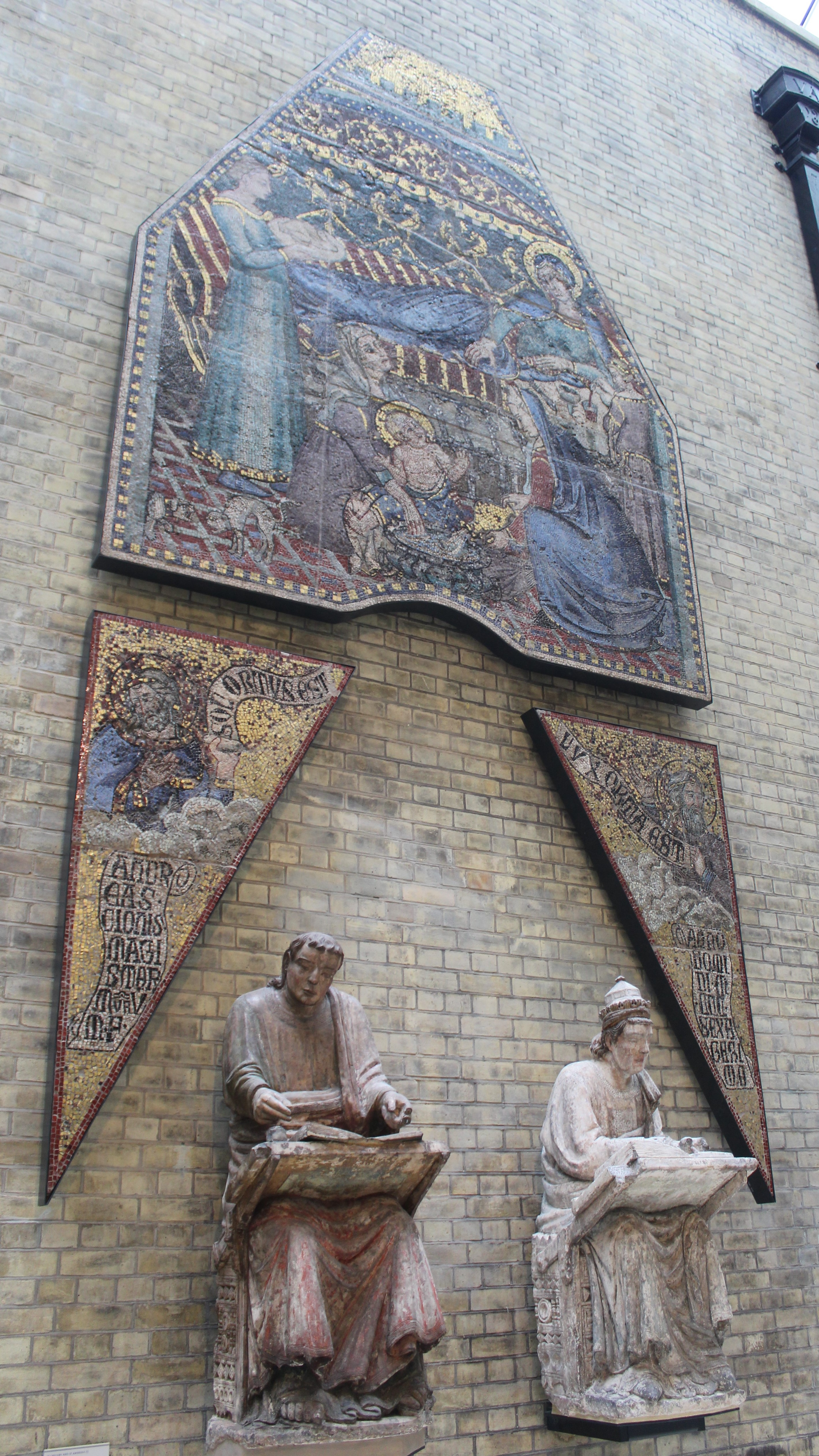
Central mosaic, once part of Orvieto Cathedral facade, depicting Birth of the Virgin designed by Ugolino, made in to mosaic by Giovanni Leonardelli

Ugolino di Prete Ilario was an Italian painter mosaicist. He was born in Siena, and executed some of the frescoes (1364) in the chapel of the Holy Corporal in the Orvieto Cathedral. In 1378 he was employed with other artists on the decoration of the walls of the tribune and choir behind the high altar of the same church. He also created the designs for some of the mosaics on the outer facade. One of his pupils was Cola Petruccioli.
