= Orvieto Cathedral =

Cathedral church in Umbria, Italy

Coordinates: 42°43′01″N 12°06′48″E

- Duomo di Orvieto
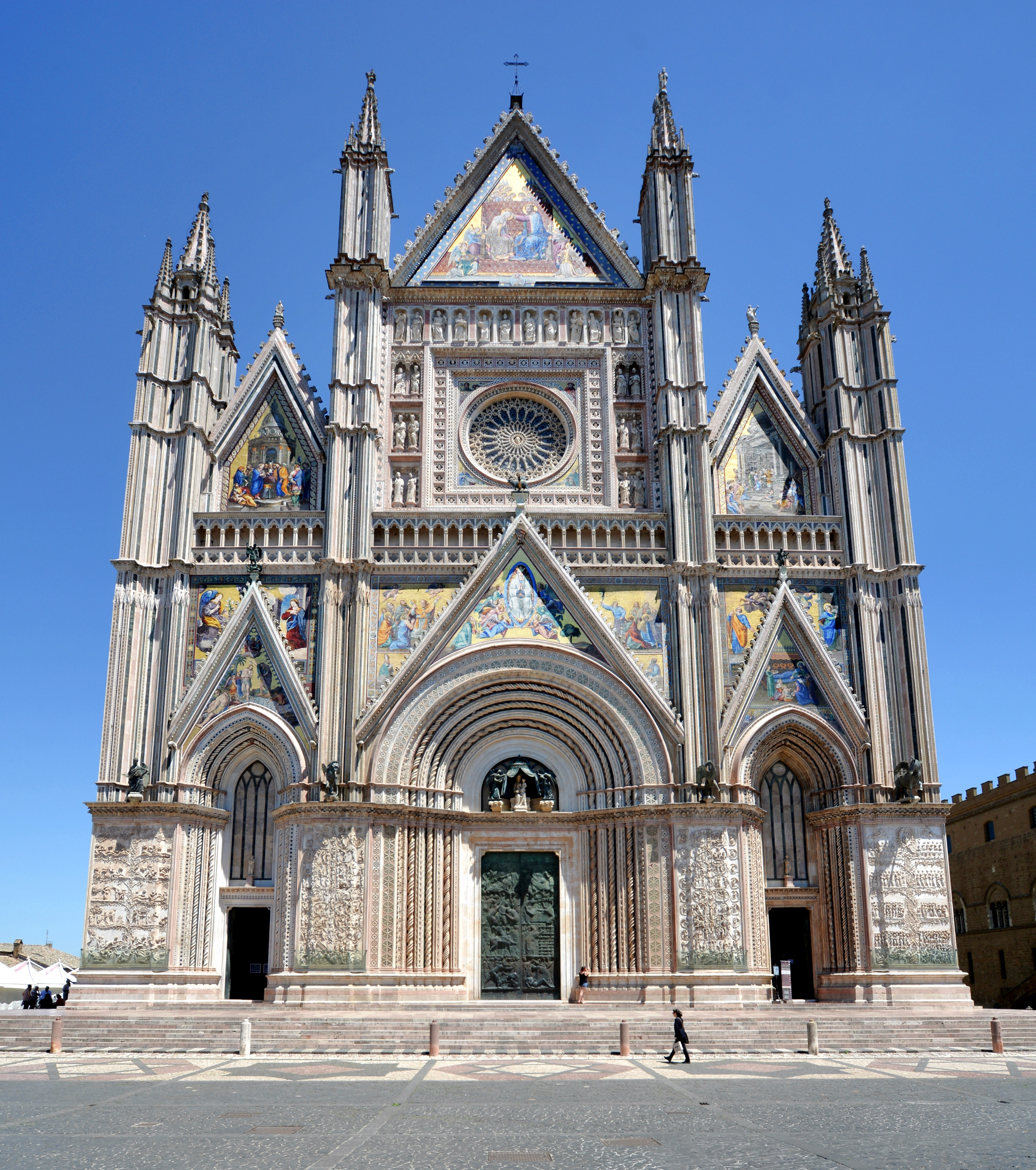
- Façade of the cathedral

Religion
- Affiliation: Roman Catholic
- Province: Terni
- Ecclesiastical or organisational status: Diocese of Orvieto-Todi
- Status: Active

Location
- Location: Orvieto, Umbria, Italy
- Interactive map of Orvieto Cathedral

Architecture
- Type: Church
- Style: Italian Gothic
- Groundbreaking: 1290
- Completed: 1591

Website
- http://www.opsm.it/

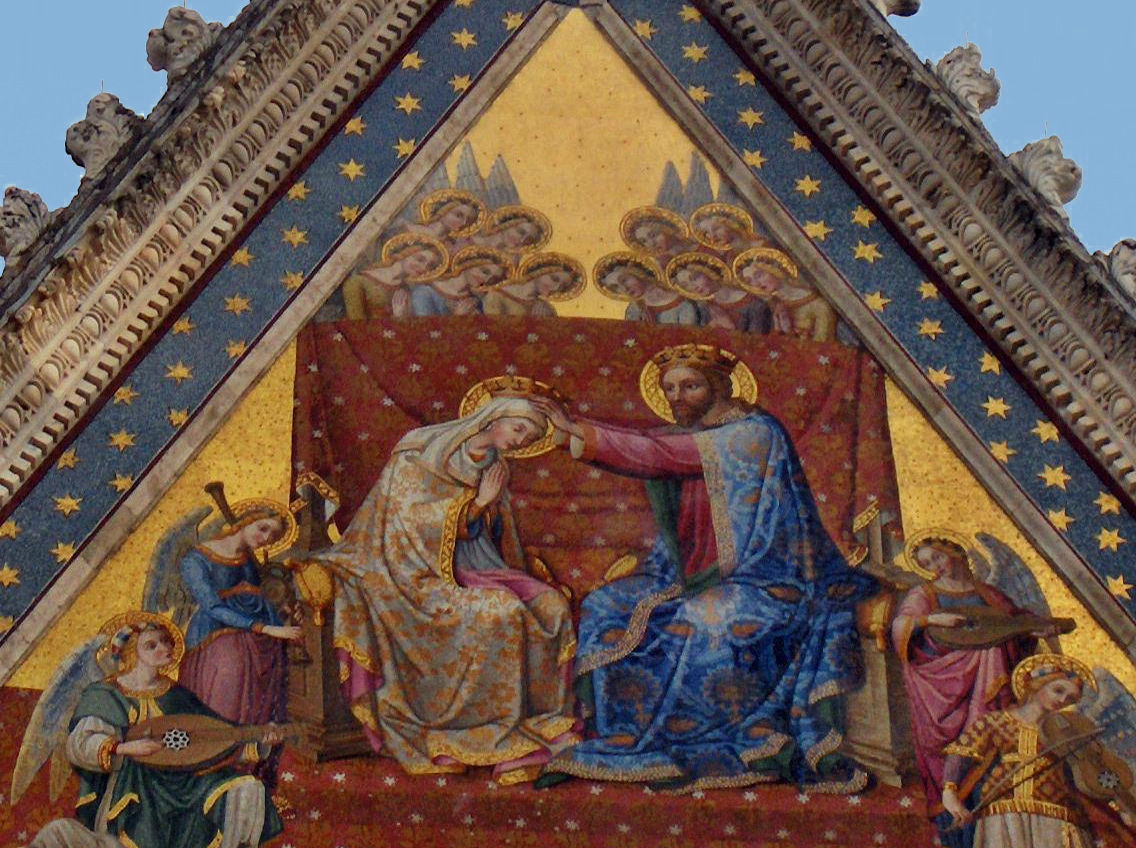
Coronation of the Virgin mosaic on the top gable of the cathedral

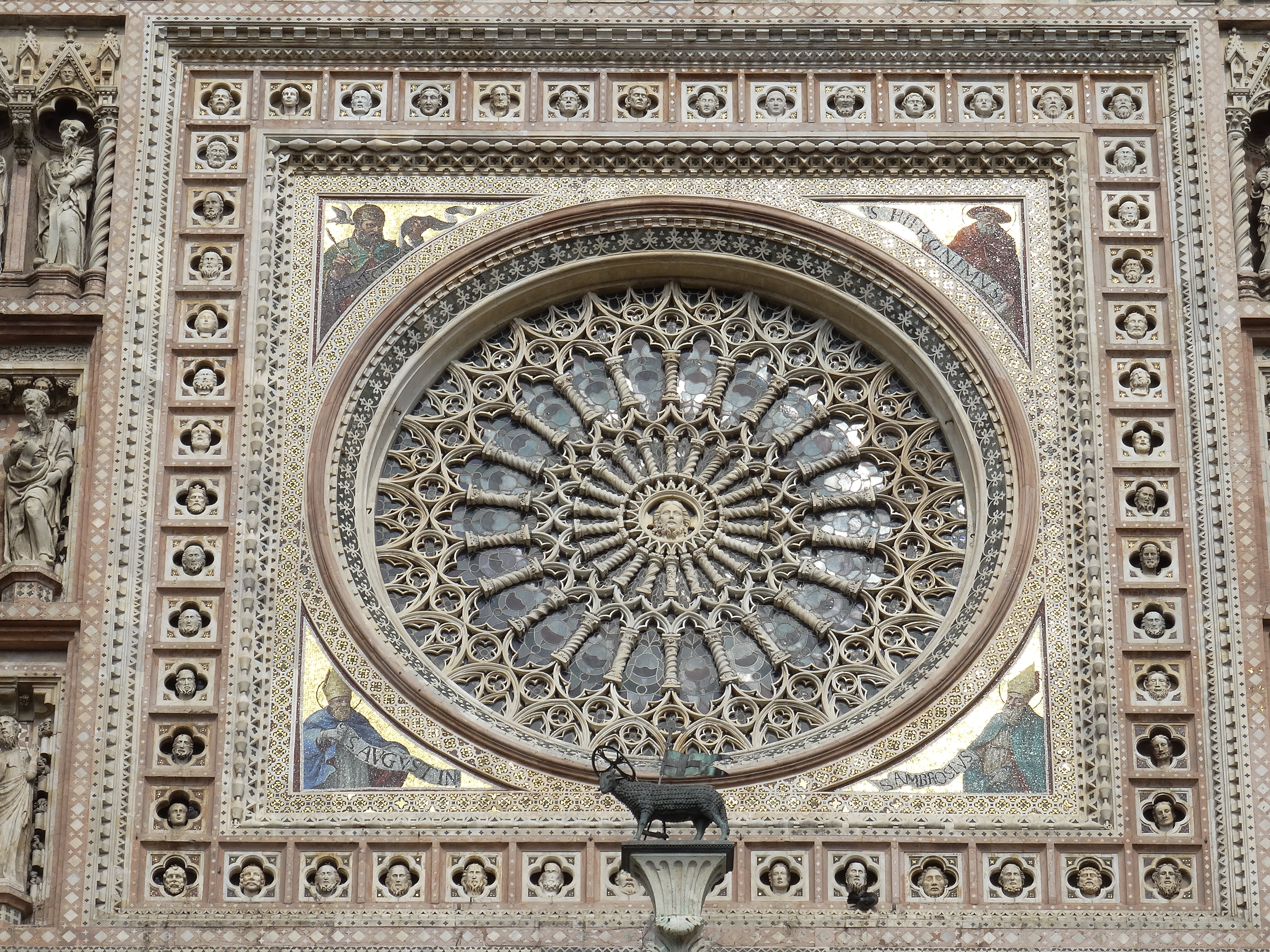
Rose window

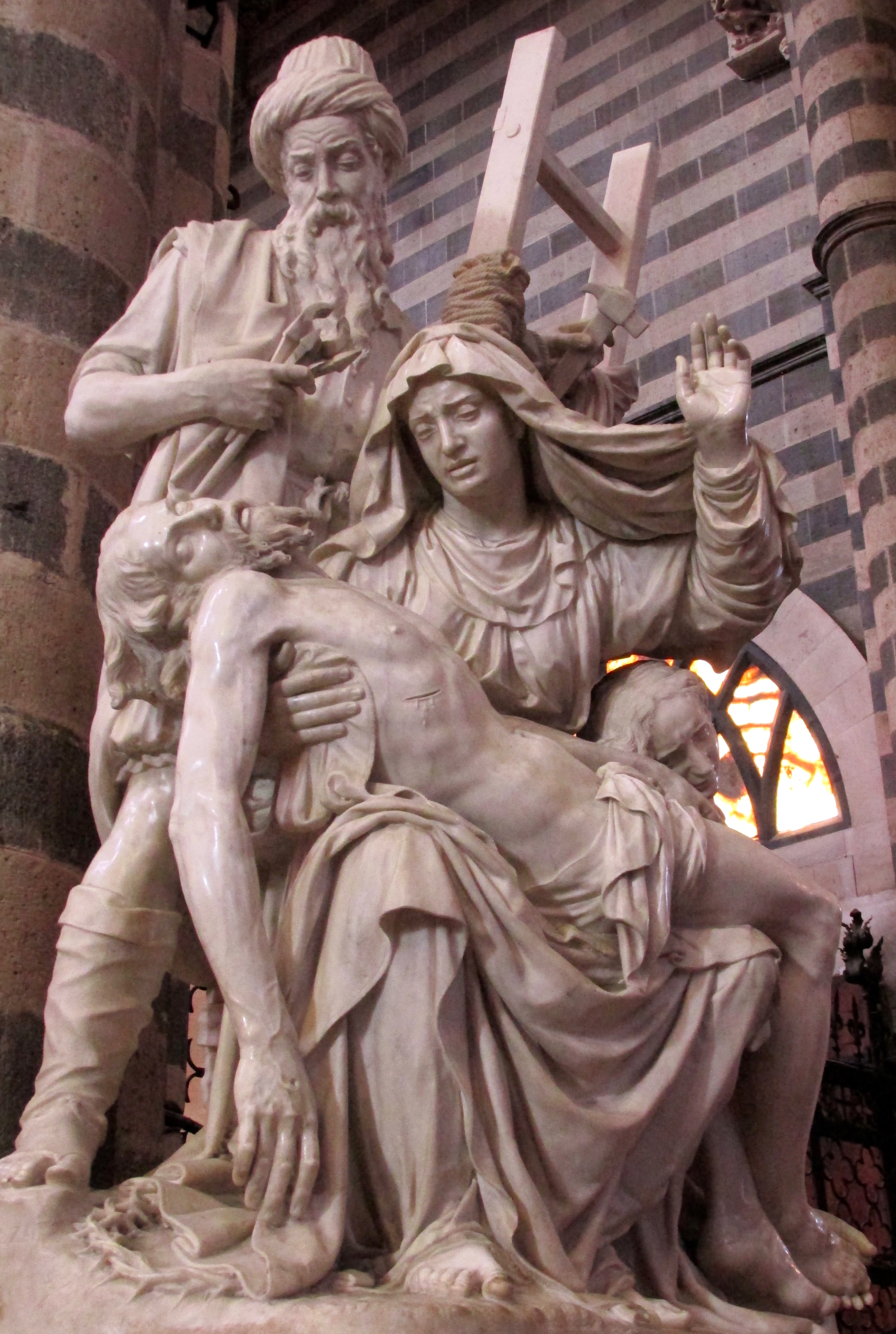
Marble Pieta, Madonna Mourning the Crucified Jesus with St. Nicodemus

Orvieto Cathedral (Italian: Duomo di Orvieto; Cattedrale di Santa Maria Assunta) is a large 14th-century Roman Catholic cathedral dedicated to the Assumption of the Virgin Mary and situated in the town of Orvieto in Umbria, central Italy. Since 1986, the cathedral in Orvieto has been the episcopal seat of the former Diocese of Todi as well.

The building was constructed under the orders of Pope Urban IV to commemorate and provide a suitable home for the Corporal of Bolsena, the relic of a miracle which is said to have occurred in 1263 in the nearby town of Bolsena, when a traveling priest who had doubts about the truth of transubstantiation found that his Host was bleeding so much that it stained the altar cloth. The cloth is now stored in the Chapel of the Corporal inside the cathedral.

Situated in a position dominating the town of Orvieto which sits perched on a volcanic plug, the cathedral's façade is a classic piece of religious construction, containing elements of design from the 14th to the 20th century, with a large rose window, golden mosaics and three huge bronze doors, while inside resides two frescoed chapels decorated by some of the best Italian painters of the period with images of Judgment Day. The cathedral has five bells, dating back to the Renaissance, tuned in E flat.

== Construction ==
The construction of the cathedral lasted almost three centuries with the design and style evolving from Romanesque to Gothic as construction progressed. The flagstone of the cathedral was laid on 13 November 1290 by Pope Nicholas IV, and construction was entrusted to chief-mason (capomastro) Fra (Friar) Bevignate di Perugia (also called Fra Bevignate da Gubbio) using a design by Arnolfo di Cambio (the architect of the cathedral of Florence). The cathedral was initially designed as a Romanesque basilica with a nave and two side aisles. However, when Giovanni di Uguccione succeeded Fra Bevignate, the design was transformed into Italian Gothic forms.

Construction continued slowly until, in 1309, the Sienese sculptor and architect Lorenzo Maitani (universalis caput magister) was commissioned to work on the church and solve several issues concerning the load-bearing capabilities of the building, especially of the choir. He substantially changed the design and construction of the building, increasing the similarity of the building to Siena Cathedral. The architecture of both buildings sometimes is classified as a substyle of Gothic architecture: Siennese Gothic style.

Maitani strengthened the external walls with flying buttresses, which proved later to be useless. These buttresses were eventually included in the walls of the newly built transept chapels. He rebuilt the apse into a rectangular shape and added a large stained-glass quadrifore window. Starting in 1310 he created the current façade up to the level of the bronze statues of the symbols of the Evangelists. He also added much of the interior. He died in 1330, shortly before the completion of the cathedral, succeeded by his sons.

In 1347 Andrea Pisano, the former Master of the Works of the Florence Cathedral, was appointed the new Master of the Works. He was followed in 1359 by Andrea di Cione, better known as Orcagna. The mosaic decoration and the rose window are attributed to him. This once octagon-based design was replaced by Orcagna with the new 22-sided polygon. This type of geometrical base is uncommon in Gothic architecture. Due to the window's unusual shape, statistical and geometric techniques were used to achieve a symmetrical design. The Sienese architect Antonio Federighi continued the decoration of the façade between 1451 and 1456, adding some Renaissance modules. In 1503 Michele Sanmicheli finished the central gable and added the right spire, which was finished by Antonio da Sangallo, Junior in 1534.

Final touches to the façade were made by Ippolito Scalza by adding the right pinnacle in 1590 and the left in 1605–1607. All in all, the succeeding architects kept a stylistic unity to the façade.

== The façade ==
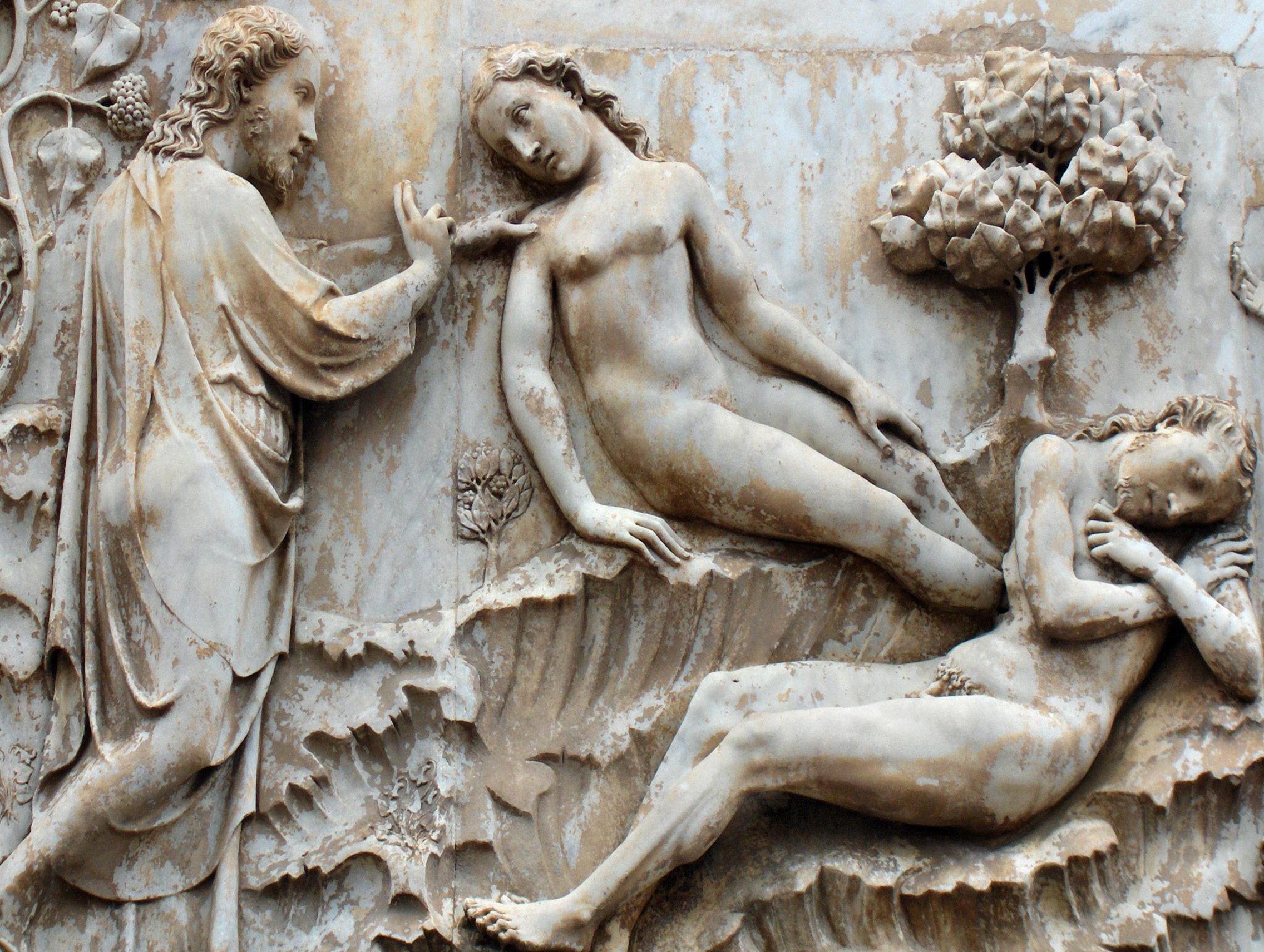
Creation of Eve (probably by Maitani)

The gothic-style façade of this cathedral is a masterpiece of the Late Middle Ages. The three-gable design is attributed to Lorenzo Maitani, who apparently had been influenced by the Tuscan Gothic façade of the Siena Cathedral by Giovanni Pisano (1287–1297) and the designs for façade of the Florence Cathedral by Arnolfo di Cambio (1294–1302).

The signature element is the golden frontage, which is decorated by large bas-reliefs and statues with the symbols (Angel, Ox, Lion, Eagle) of the Evangelists created by Maitani and collaborators (between 1325 and 1330) standing on the cornice above the sculptured panels on the piers. In 1352, Matteo di Ugolino da Bologna added the bronze Lamb of God above the central gable and the bronze statue of Saint Michael on top of the gable of the left entrance.

The bas-reliefs on the piers depict biblical stories from the Old and New Testament. These marbles from the fourteenth and fifteenth century are the collective and anonymous work of at least three or four masters with assistance of their workshops, It is assumed that Maitani must have worked on the reliefs on the first pier from the left, as work on the reliefs began before 1310. The installation of these marbles on the piers began in 1331. They depict from left to right:

- Old Testament stories: Book of Genesis
- Tree of Jesse with scenes from the Old Testament with messianic prophesies of Redemption.
- New Testament stories, with below Abraham sleeping: episodes from the lives of Jesus and Mary
- Last Judgment: Book of Revelation

The original mosaics on the façade were created between 1350 and 1390 by Piero di Puccio and other mosaicists. Many of these originals were replaced in 1484, 1713 and 1842; often leading to their destruction. And what is now present were designed in the 16th-century by Cesare Nebbia and in the 18th-century by Giuseppe Ottaviani. Most of these mosaic represent major scenes from the life of the Virgin Mary, from the "Nativity of Mary" in the lower right gable to the "Coronation of the Virgin Mary" in the topmost gable. One of these mosaicists is recorded as Fra Giovanni Leonardelli.

Central to the mosaics is the large rose window built by the sculptor and architect Orcagna between 1354 and 1380. In the niches above the rose window stand the twelve apostles, while in niches on both sides twelve Old Testament prophets are represented in pairs. Statues in niches are typical for French Gothic cathedrals, which may have been an influence. Eight statues have been attributed in the records to Nicola de Nuto. The spandrels around the rose window are decorated with mosaics representing the four Doctors of the Church. The frame of the rose window holds 52 carved heads, while the center of the rose window holds a carved head of the Christ.

The newest part of the decoration are the three bronze doors which give access to the entrance of the cathedral. These were finished in 1970 by the Sicilian sculptor Emilio Greco (1913–1995) depicting mercies from the life of Christ and are surmounted by a sculpture of the Madonna and Child created by Andrea Pisano in 1347.

The cathedral's side walls, in contrast to the façade, are built with alternating layers of local white travertine and blue-grey basalt stone.

== The interior ==
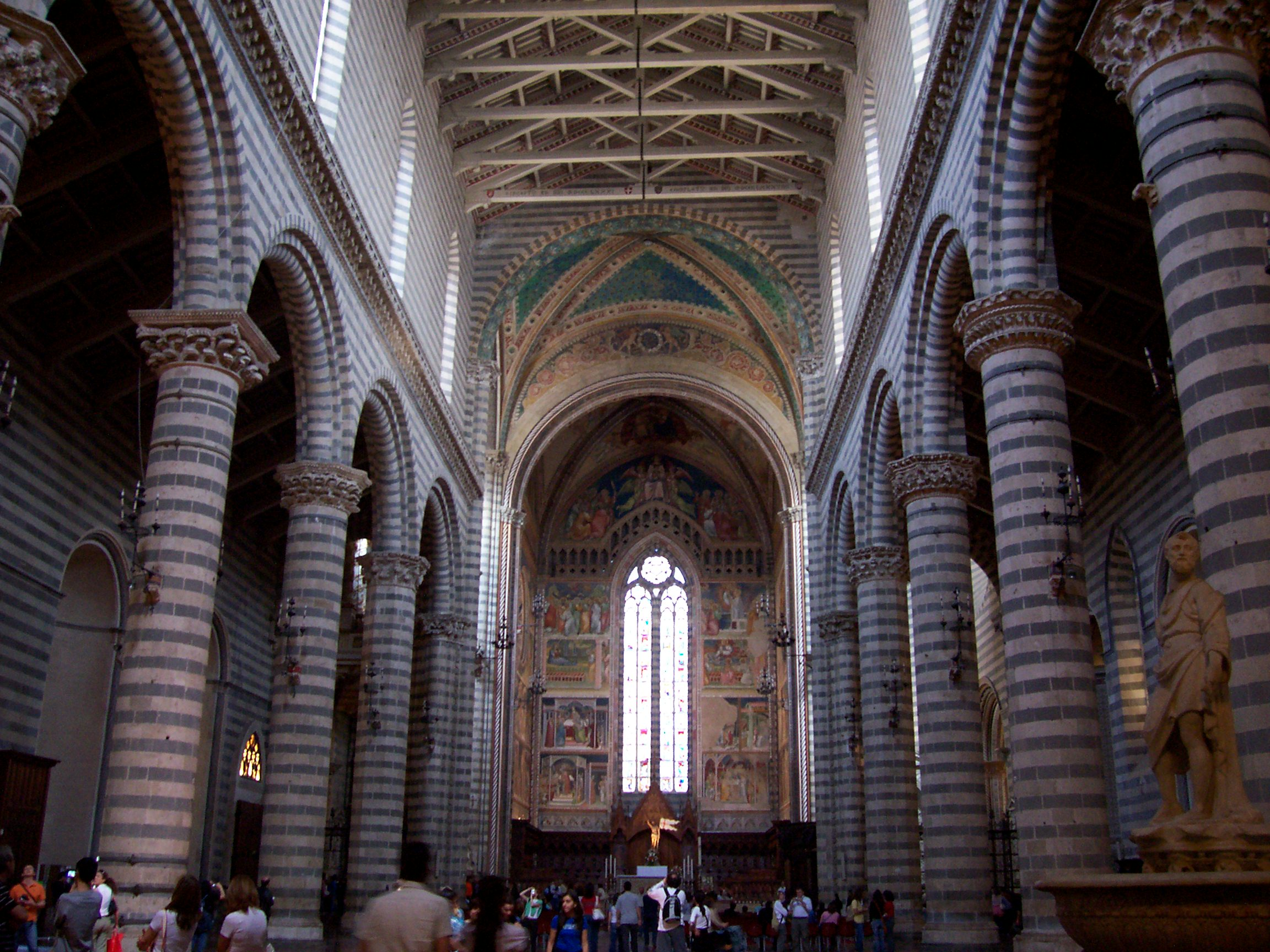
The interior

The cathedral consists of a nave with six bays and two aisles, and is cruciform in shape. The interior has deliberately been left uncluttered and spacious. The interior, like the exterior, is decorated with alternative rows of basalt and travertine but only to a height of about 1.5 m. The rows above them were painted in alternative rows of black and white stripes in the late nineteenth century.

The cylindrical columns also consist of alternate rows of travertine and basalt. Their shape and ornamentation evolved during the construction of the cathedral, as well as the decoration of the capitals. The alabaster panes in the bottom parts of the aisle windows keep the interior cool during the fierce Italian summer, while the neo-Gothic stained-glass in the upper parts of the windows date from 1886 to 1891 and were designed by Francesco Moretti.

The trussed timber roof was decorated in the 1320s by Pietro di Lello and Vanuzzo di Mastro Pierno, and was heavily restored in the 1890s by the architect Paolo Zampi and Paolo Coccheri to its current state. During the years 1335–1338 the transept was roofed with quadripartite (four-celled) stone vaults.

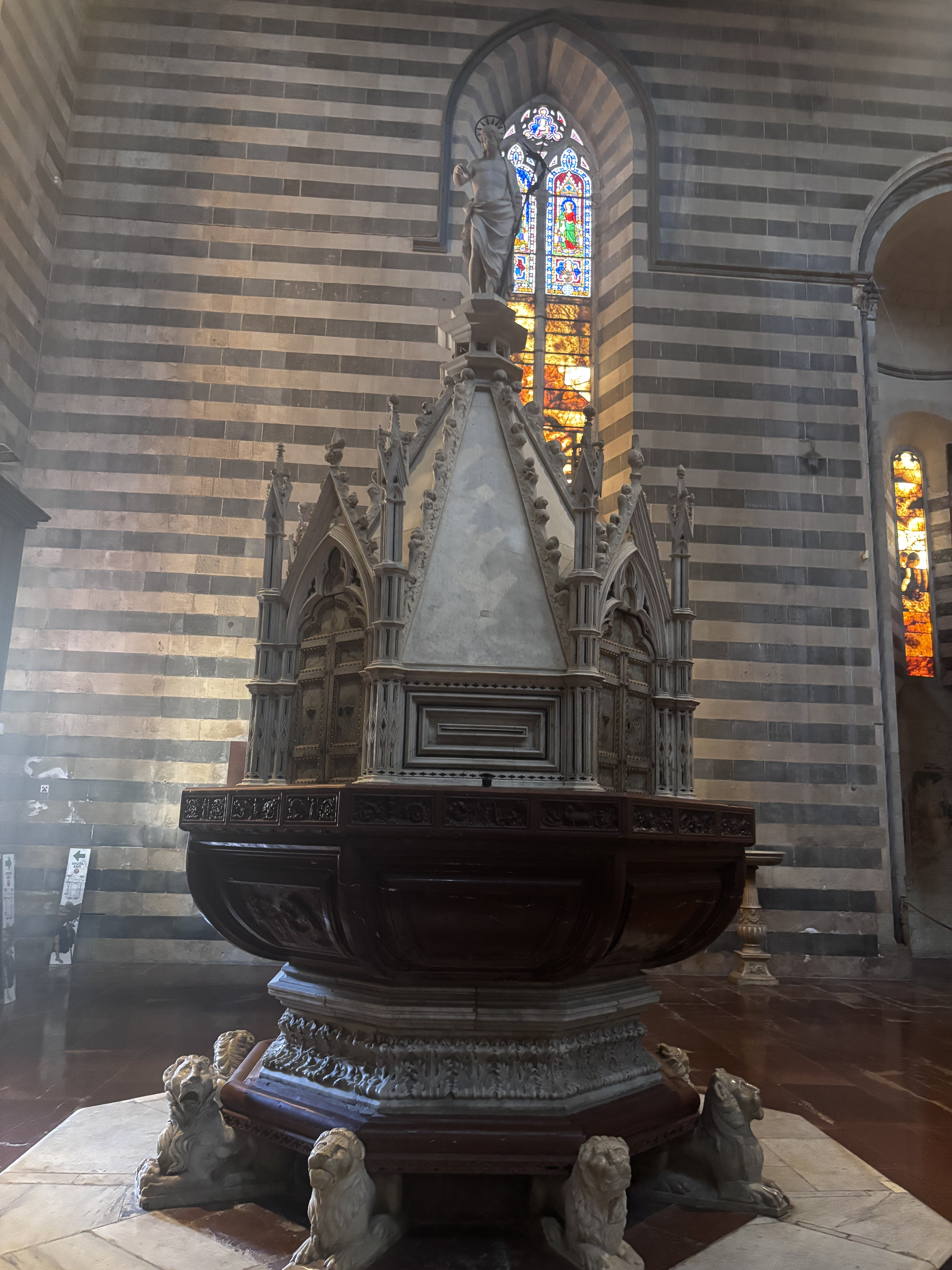
The baptismal font of Orvieto Cathedral

Near the left entrance is the large marble baptismal font with lions and elaborate frieze reliefs. It was begun in 1390 by Luca di Giovanni. It was expanded sixteen years later by Pietro di Giovanni from Freiburg, who added the red marble basin, and Sano di Matteo, who sculpted the octagonal pyramid in 1407.

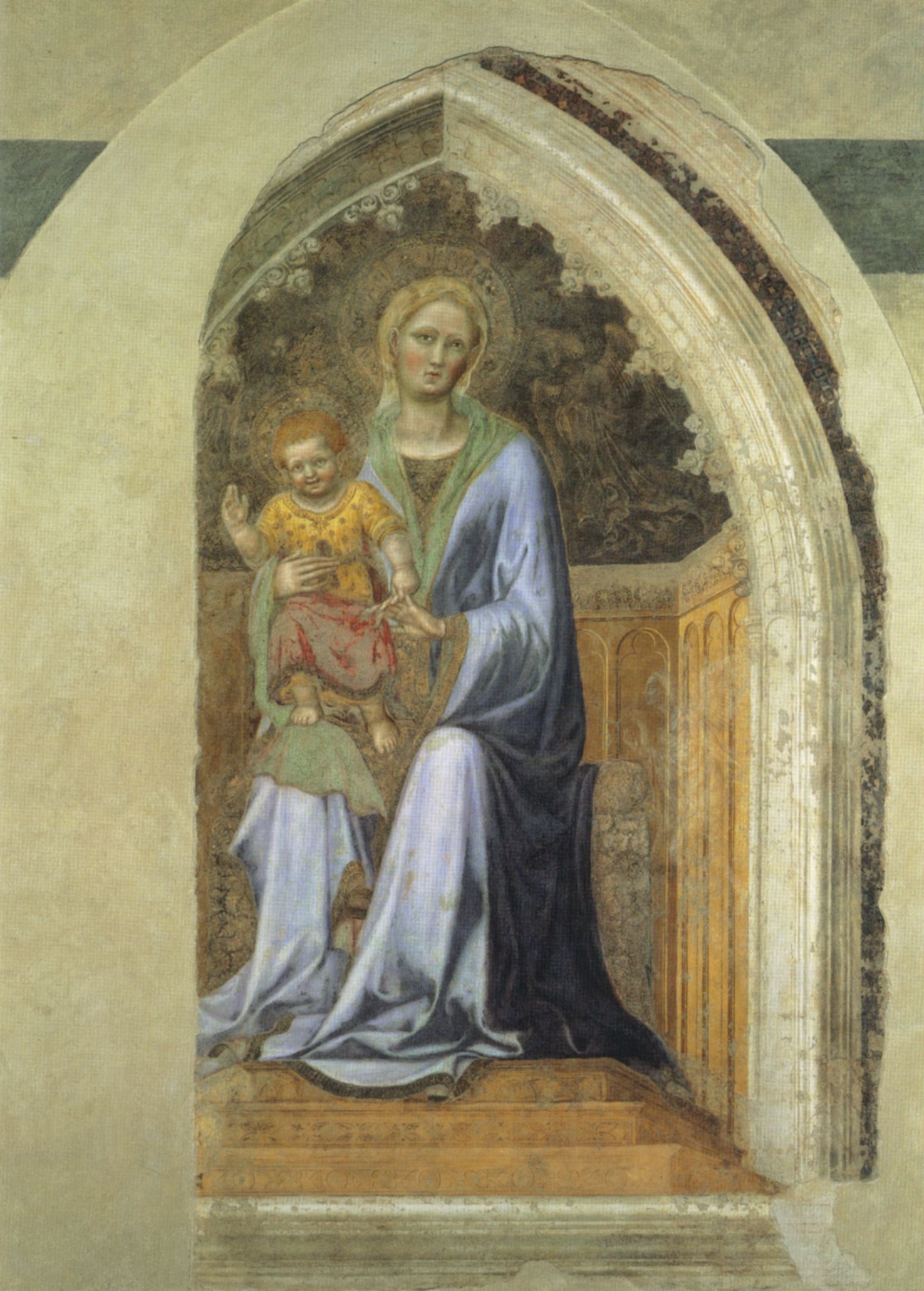
Gentile da Fabriano, Madonna Enthroned with Child.

It is overlooked by a fresco in International Gothic style of the "Madonna Enthroned with Child", a Maestà painted by Gentile da Fabriano in 1425. This is the only fresco saved when the stucco altars were added to the nave chapels in the late 16th century. These altars in turn were destroyed in the 19th century and only fragments of the other 14th- and 15th-century frescoes reappeared. Some of these frescoes are ascribed to Pietro di Puccio (who also painted frescoes in the Camposanto in Pisa).

At the beginning of the nave stands a holy water stoup, sculpted by the Sienese architect Antonio Federighi between 1451 and 1456. During that time he also contributed to the decoration of the façade.

Above the entrance of the Chapel of the Corporal stands the cathedral's large organ, containing 5,585 pipes and originally designed by Ippolito Scalza and Bernardino Benvenuti in the fifteenth century before being redesigned in 1913 and 1975. Scalza's other major contribution to the church is the large Pietà he sculpted in 1579. it took him eight years to carve the four figures in this imposing marble group.

== Apse ==
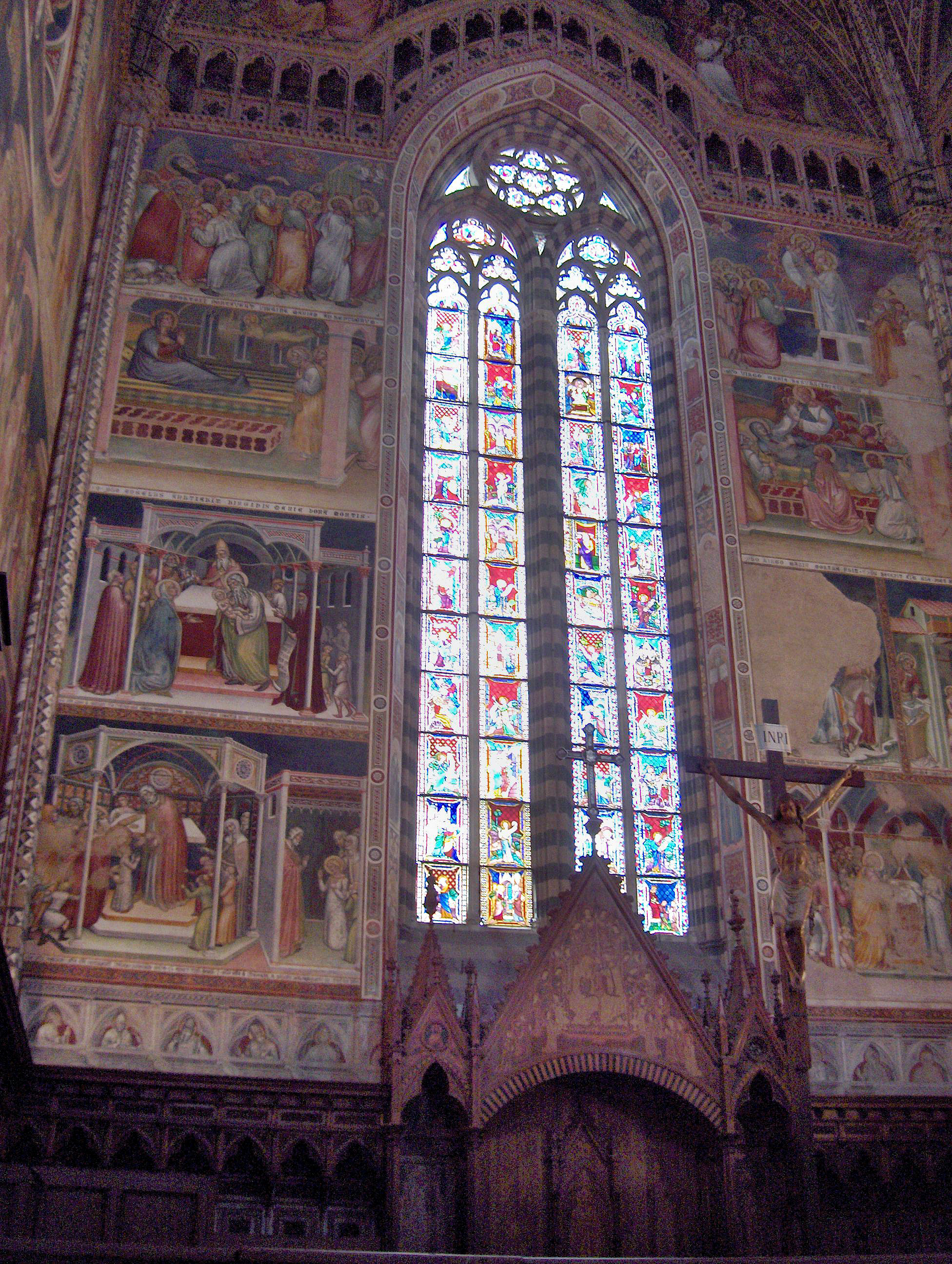
Partial view of the apse

The large stained-glass quadrifore window in the apse was made between 1328 and 1334 by Giovanni di Bonino, a glass master from Assisi. The design was probably made by Maitani. Above the altar hangs a large polychrome wooden crucifix attributed to Maitani.

Construction of the Gothic wooden choir stalls was begun in 1329 by Giovanni Ammannati together with a group of Sienese wood carvers. They stood originally in the center of the nave but were moved to the apse around 1540.

Behind the altar are a series of damaged Gothic frescoes dedicated to the life of the Virgin Mary, occupying the three walls completely. They were created around 1370 by the local artist Ugolino di Prete Ilario and a few collaborators such as Pietro di Puccino, Cola Petruccioli and Andrea di Giovanni. It took them about ten years to finish. This series of frescoes were the largest in Italy at that time. They have been restored every hundred years for several following centuries. Two scenes, the Annunciation and the Visitation, were redone by Antonio del Massaro at the end of the 15th century.

=== Chapel of the Corporal ===
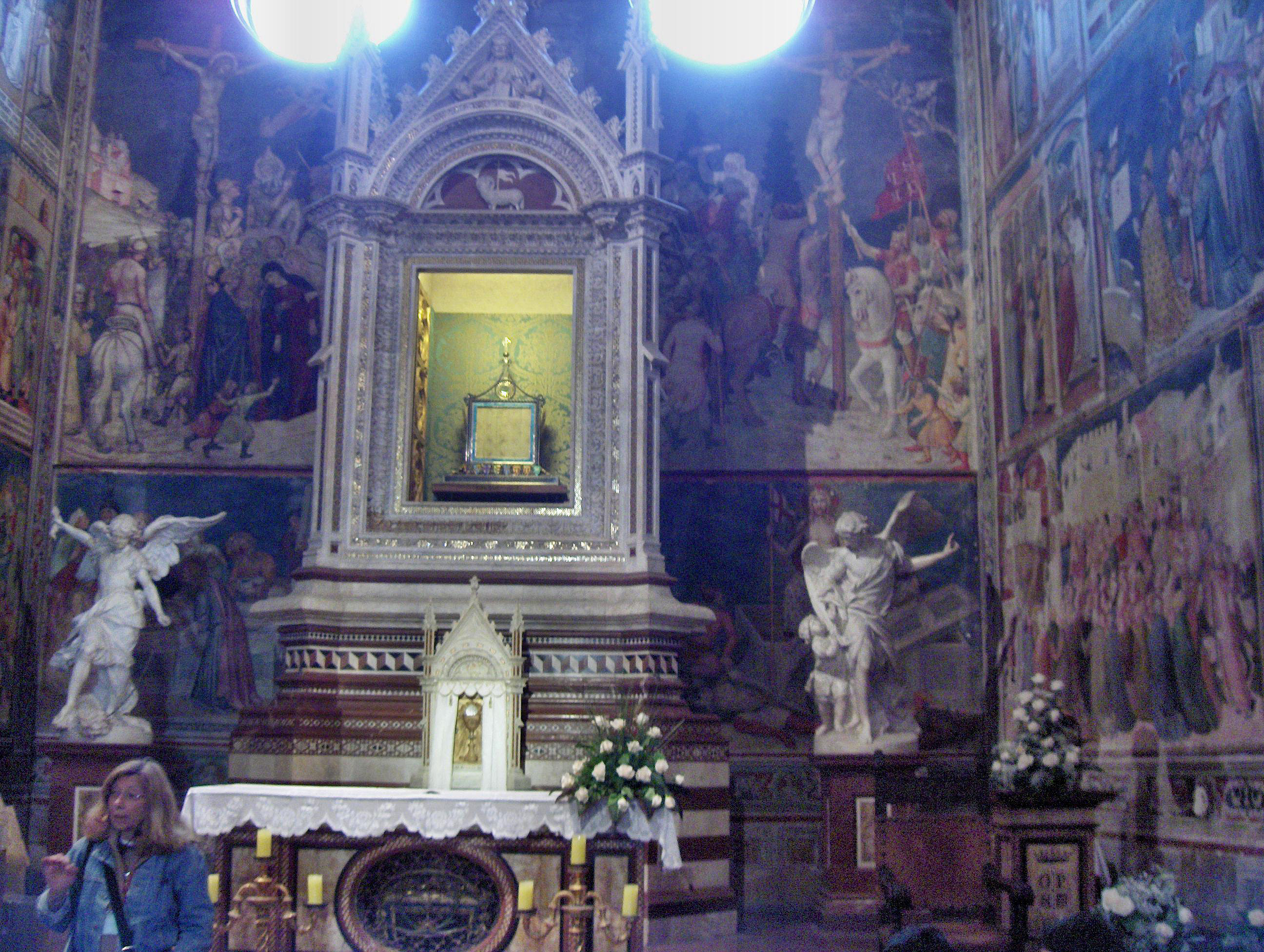
Chapel of the Corporal

The Cappella del Corporale lies on the north side of the main crossing. It was built between 1350 and 1356 to house the stained corporal of the miracle of Bolsena. It is from this chapel that the reliquary with the corporal is carried in religious processions through the town on the Feast of Corpus Christi. In this Chapel you will find relics from the eucharistic miracle in Bolsena. Some people refer to this miracle as the miracle of Bolsena, because that is where it actually happened. However the relics are kept in this cathedral in Orvieto, because this is where the Pope was at the time. Therefore people can also refer to this miracle as the miracle of Orvieto.

The chapel is two bays deep and covered with quadripartite vaults. It is closed off by a wrought iron gate, made between 1355 and 1362 by Matteo di Ugolino da Bologna and finished by Giovanni de Micheluccio da Orvieto in 1364.

The chapel is decorated with frescoes depicting on the left wall the history of the Eucharist and on the right wall miracles concerning the bleeding host throughout church history. They were painted between 1357 and 1363 by three artists from Orvieto: Ugolino di Prete Ilario, Domenico di Meo and Giovanni di Buccio Leonardelli. They were painted prior to the frescoes in the apse. They were restored in the middle of the 19th century.

The aedicule-shaped tabernacle on the altar was designed in 1358 by Nicola da Siena and finished by Orcagna.

In a niche on the right wall stands a panel of the Madonna dei Raccomandati (c. 1320). It was painted in the Italian Byzantine tradition by the Sienese artist Lippo Memmi, brother-in-law of Simone Martini.

Till the early 21st century, at the centre of the chapel stood the Reliquary of the Santo Corporale in silver, gilded silver and varicoloured translucent enamel containing the bloodstained corporal. This Gothic masterpiece, in the form of a triptych, was made by Sienese goldsmith Ugolino di Vieri between 1337 and 1338. It shows 24 scenes of the life of Christ and eight stories about the corporal. It has been moved to the Museo dell'Opera del Duomo located in the adjacent piazza.

==== A martyred mayor ====
The cathedral also contains the tomb of St. Pietro Parenzo. Appointed by Pope Innocent III as the city's mayor with a mandate to restore order, Parenzo's efforts were so successful that the Cathars (i.e., adherents of the Cathar heresy) murdered him in 1199. Thereafter, many related that, from asking Parenzo for his intercession at his tomb, God had granted them their request. As a result, people began flocking in pilgrimage to the Duomo in droves from throughout central Italy, and numerous miracles were reported. Parenzo quickly became honored as a saint.

His remains were transferred to the cathedral after its construction. There is an oval window in the center of the altar through can be seen the small coffer which holds them.

=== Chapel of the Madonna di San Brizio ===
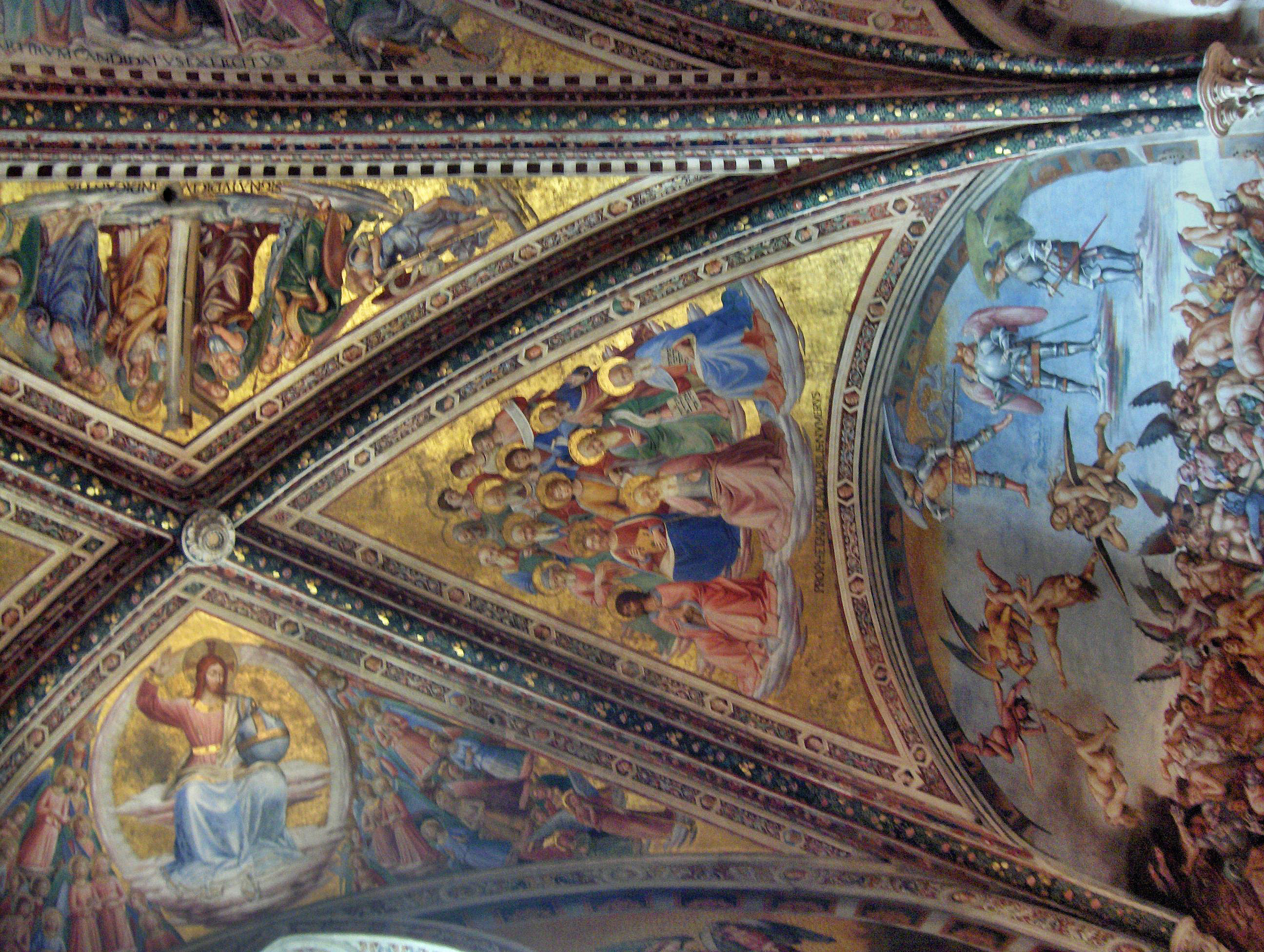
Partial view on the vault – Christ in Judgment by Fra Angelico and Benozzo Gozzoli; other frescoes by Luca Signorelli and his school

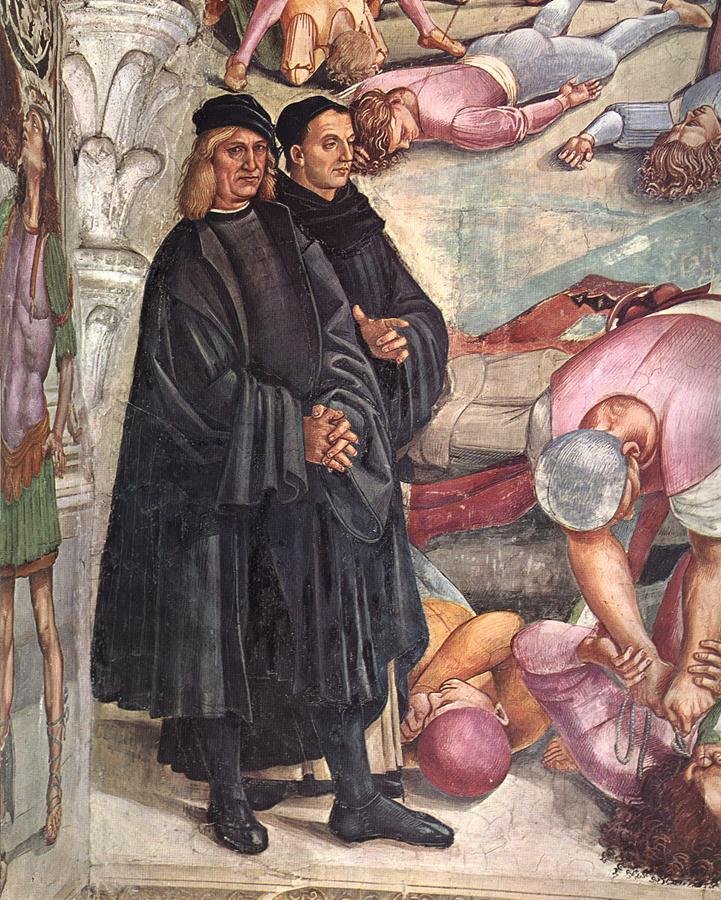
'Selfportrait of Luca Signorelli (left) with Fra Angelico.

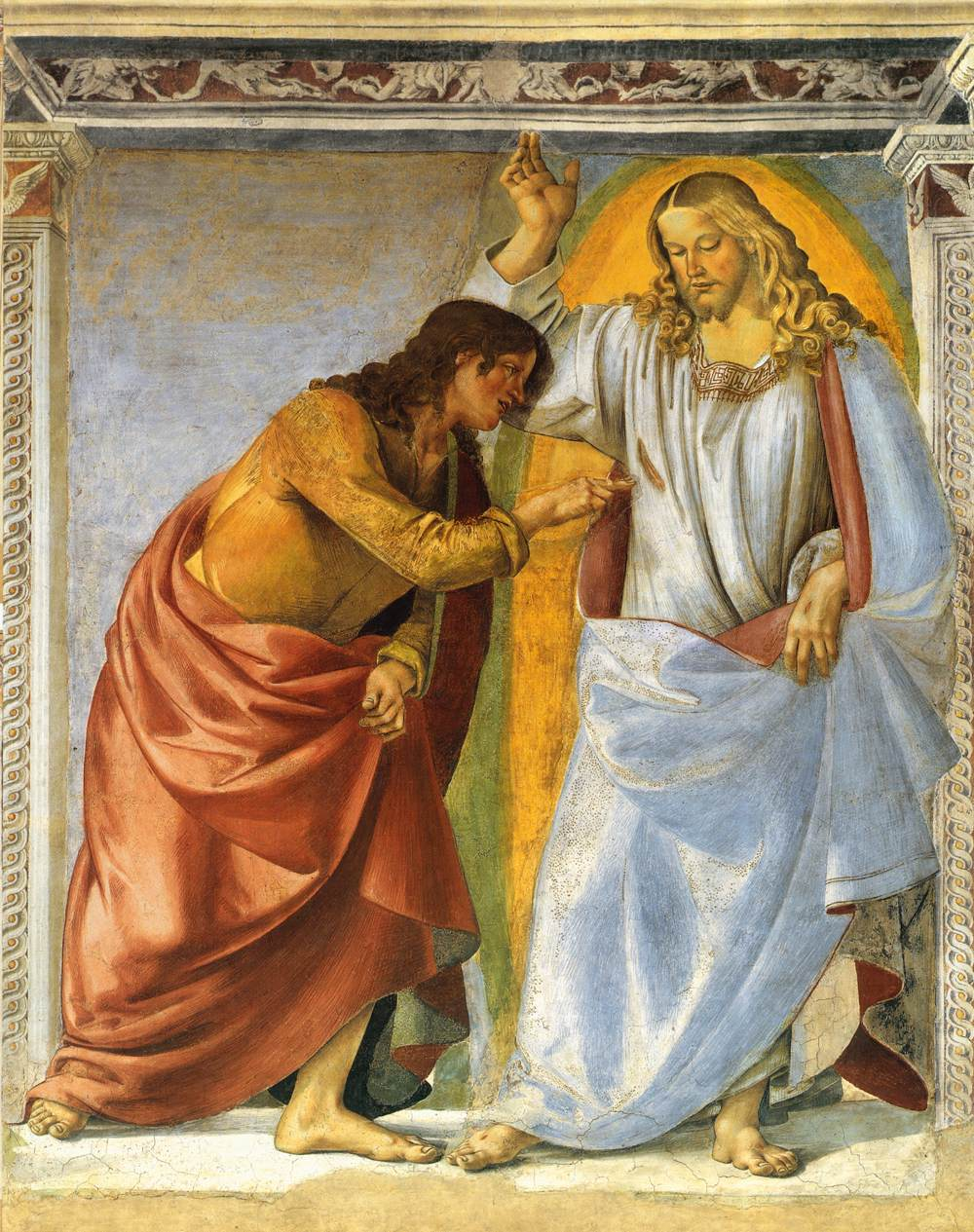
Christ and the Doubting Thomas

This chapel was a fifteenth-century addition to the cathedral. It is almost identical in structure to the Chapel of the Corporal. The construction of this chapel (also known as the Cappella Nuova and Signorelli chapel) was started in 1408 and completed in 1444. It is closed off from the rest of the cathedral by two wrought iron gates. The first one closes off the right arm of the transept. It was signed by the Sienese master Conte di lello Orlandi (1337). The second gate stands at the entrance of the chapel and is of a much later date. It was signed by master Gismondo da Orvieto (1516).

Originally called the Cappella Nuova, or New Chapel, in 1622 this chapel was dedicated to Saint Britius (San Brizio), one of the first bishops of Spoleto and Foligno, who evangelized the people of Orvieto. Legend says that he left them a panel of the Madonna della Tavola, a Madonna enthroned with Child and Angels. This painting is from an anonymous late 13th-century master from Orvieto, who was probably influenced by Cimabue and Coppo di Marcovaldo. The face of the Child is a restoration from the 14th century. This panel stands on the late-Baroque altar of the Gloria, dating from 1715 and made by Bernardino Cametti.

Fra Angelico and Benozzo Gozzoli began the decoration of the vault of the chapel in 1447. They painted only two sections: Christ in Judgment and Angels and Prophets as they were summoned in the same year to the Vatican by Pope Nicholas V to paint the Niccoline Chapel. Work came to a halt until Perugino was approached in 1489. However, he never began. After being abandoned for about 50 years, the decoration of the rest of the vault was awarded to Luca Signorelli on 5 April 1499. He added the scenes with the Choir of the Apostles, of the Doctors, of the Martyrs, Virgins and Patriarchs.

His work pleased the board and they assigned him to paint frescoes in the large lunettes of the walls of the chapel. Work began in 1500 and was completed in 1503. (There was a break in 1502 because funds were lacking.) These frescoes in the chapel are considered the most complex and impressive work by Signorelli. He and his school spent two years creating a series of frescoes concerning the Apocalypse and the Last Judgment, starting with the Preaching of the Antichrist, continuing with tumultuous episodes of the End of the World, finding a counterpart in the Resurrection of the Flesh. The fourth scene is a frightening depiction of the Damned taken to Hell and received by Demons. On the wall behind the altar, Signorelli depicts on the left side the Elect being led to Paradise and on the right side the Reprobates driven to Hell. He added to these expressive scenes some striking details.

- The Preaching of the Antichrist was painted shortly after the trial on charges of heresy and execution of the Observant Dominican friar, Giralamo Savonarola in Florence on 23 May 1498. The Antichirst is depicted under the influence of the incarnated angel named Satan who suggests him what to say, while touching his rib cage. The analogy of the Antichrist sowing discord by preaching slander and calumny, would not have been lost on late 15th-century viewers. To underscore the contemporary analogy, at lower right, Signorelli includes recognizable portraits of the young Raphael, in a striking pose; Dante; possibly Christopher Columbus; Boccaccio; Petrarch; and Cesare Borgia, and, on the left, he depicts himself, dressed in noble garments, and Fra Angelico, in his Dominican habit.
- In the left background the Antichrist is expelled from heavens by the archangel Michael, and his acolytes killed by a rain of fire. In the right background he depicts a large, domed temple in the Renaissance style.
- The End of the World is painted over the arch of the entrance to the chapel. Signorelli paints frightening scenes as cities collapse in ruins and people flee under darkened skies. On the right side below he shows the Sibyl with her book of prophesies, and King David with raised hand predicting the end of the world. In the left corner below, people are scrambling and lying in diverse positions on the ground, producing an illusion as if falling out of the painting. This successful attempt in foreshortening was striking in its day.
- The Resurrection of the Flesh is a study by Signorelli, exploring the possibilities of the male and female nude, while trying to recreate a three-dimensional setting. Signorelli shows his mastery in depicting the many positions of the human body. The risen, brought back to life, are crawling in an extreme effort from under the earth and are received by two angels in the sky blowing on a trumpet.
- The Damned are taken to Hell and received by Demons is in stark contrast to the previous one. Signorelli has gone to the extremes of his fantasy and evocative powers to portray his cataclysmic vision of the horrible fate, the agony and the despair of the damned. He uses the naked human body as his only expressive element, showing the isolated bodies entangling each other, merging in a convoluted mass. They are overpowered by demons in near-human form, depicted in colours of every shade of decomposing flesh. Above them, a flying demon transports a woman. This is probably a depiction of the Whore of the Apocalypse.
- The Elect in Paradise shows the elect in ecstasy looking up to music-making angels. The few extant drawings, made in preparation for this fresco, are kept in the Uffizi in Florence. They show each figure in various positions, indicating that Signorelli must have used real models in the nude to portray his figures.
Frescos

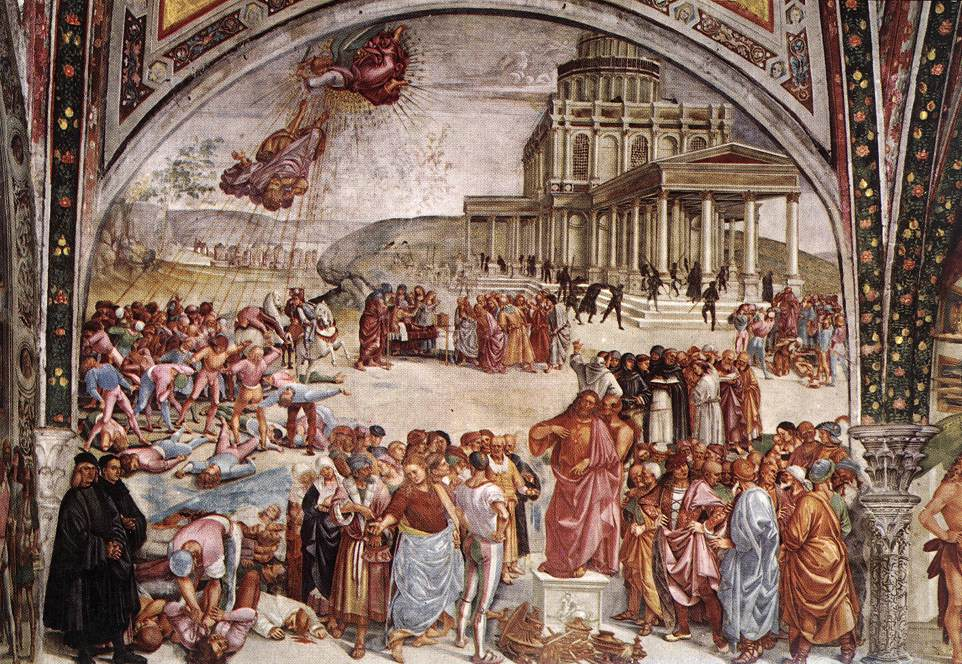
Fresco of the Deeds of the Antichrist (c. 1501) in Orvieto Cathedral.

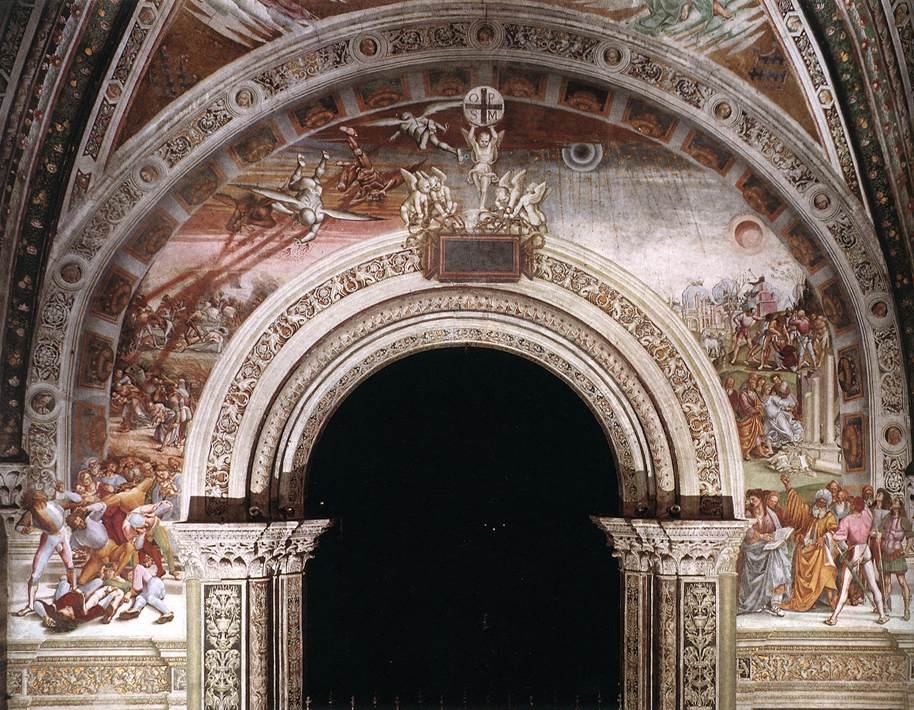
The Apocalypse

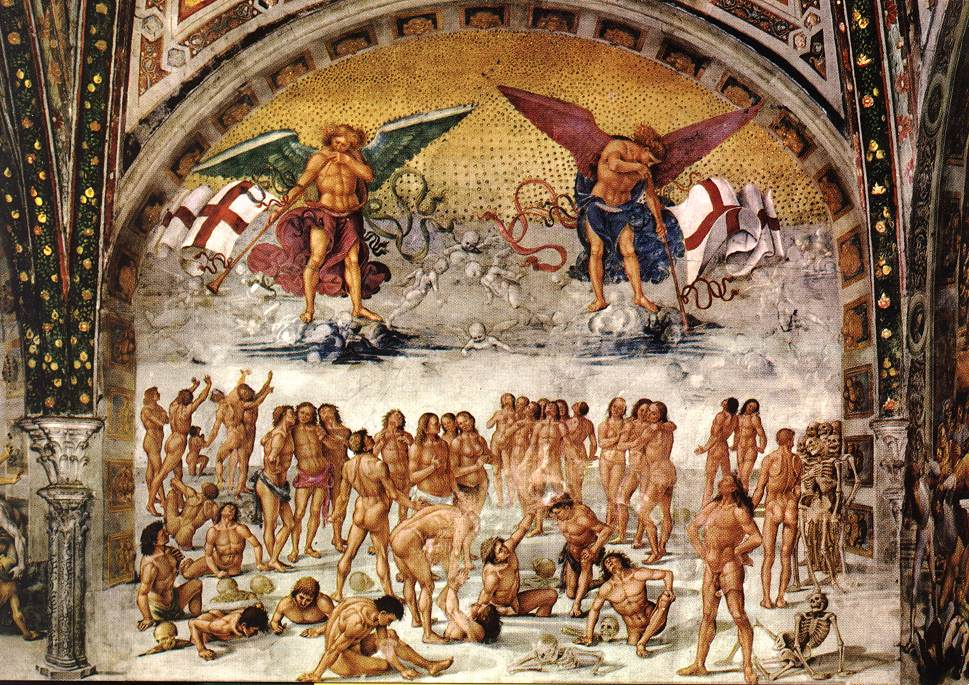
Resurrection of the Flesh (1499–1502) Fresco Chapel of San Brizio, Duomo, Orvieto.

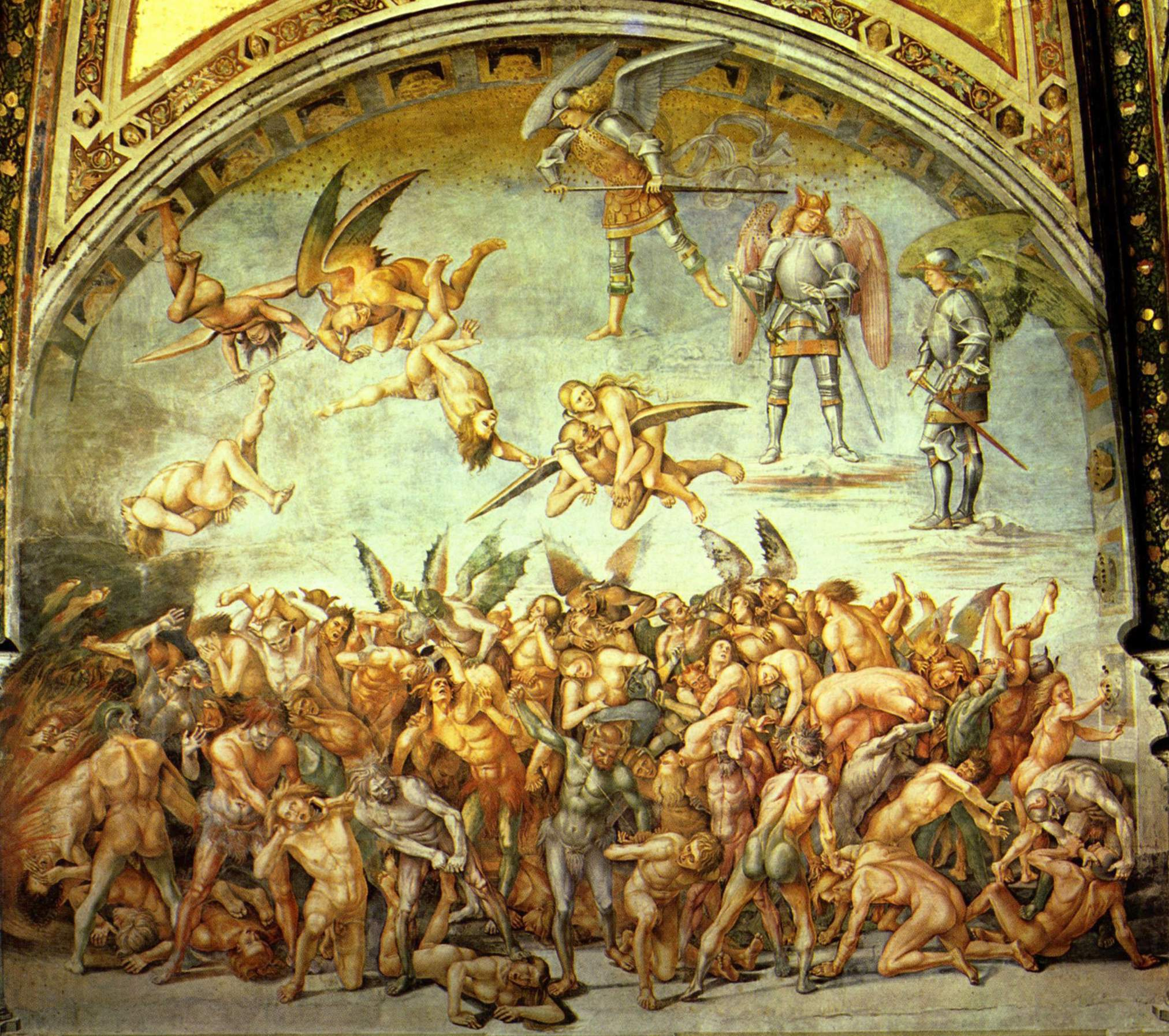
The Damned in Hell

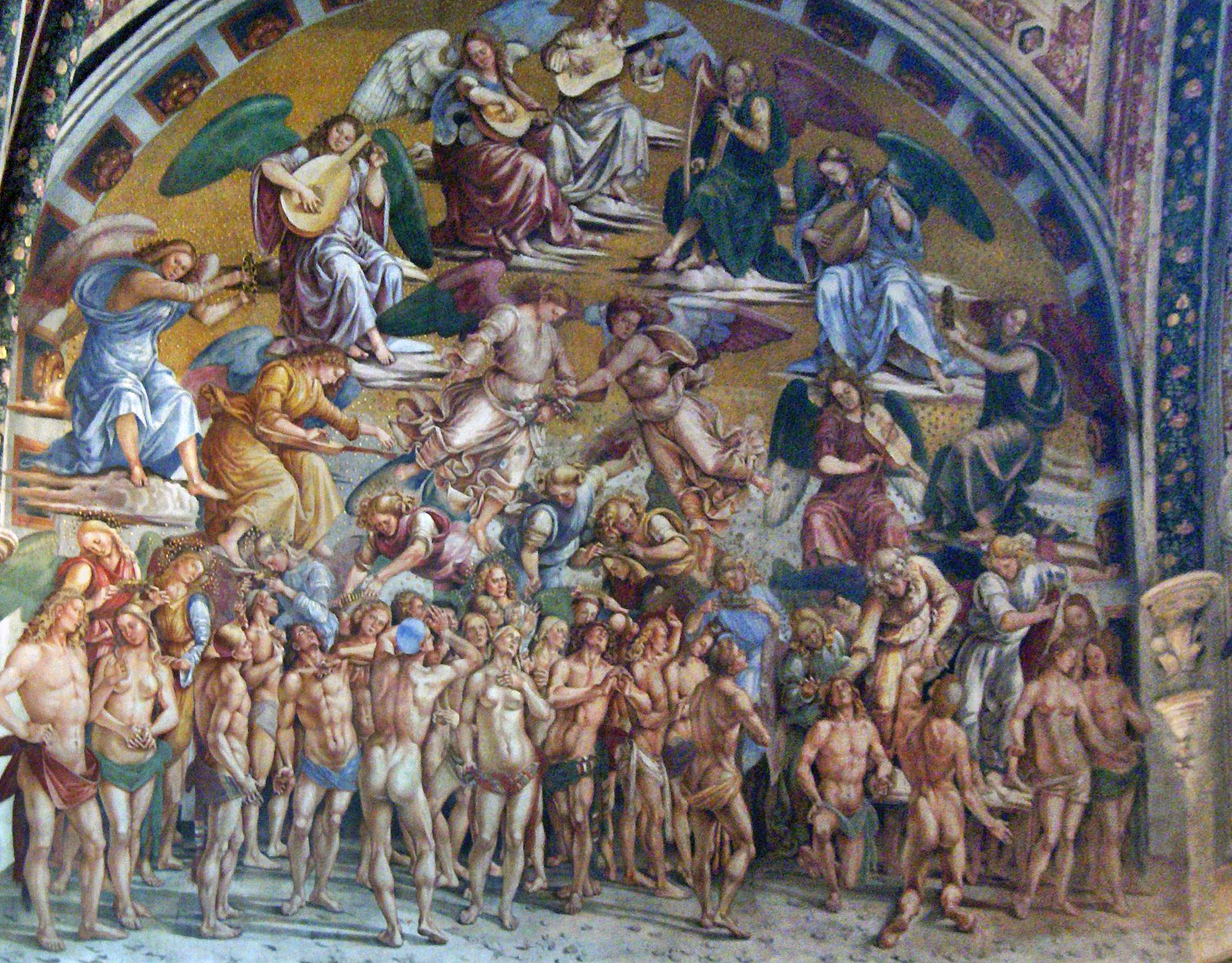
The Elect In Paradise

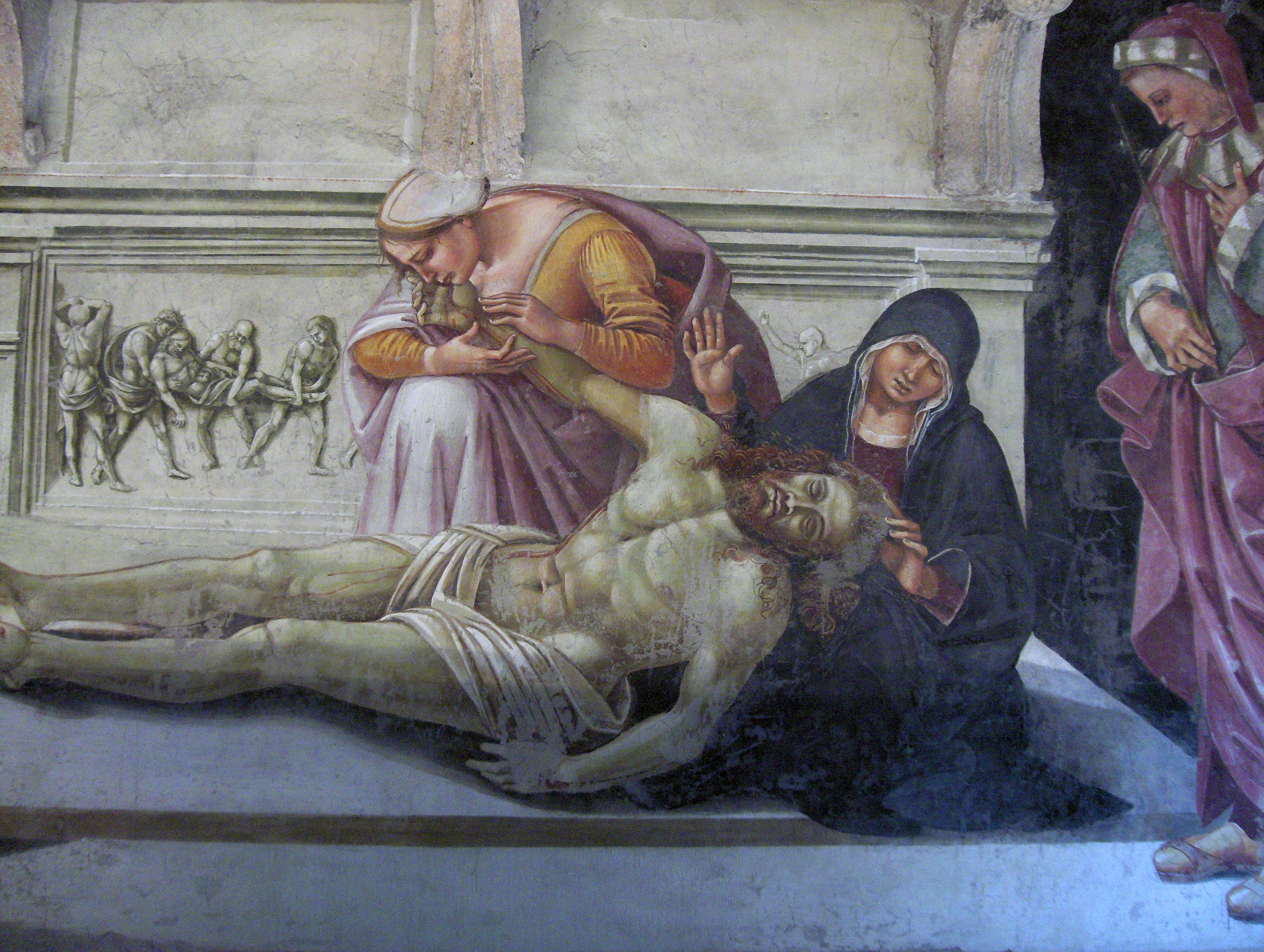
Pietà wall painting

Below this are smaller paintings of famous writers and philosophers watching the unfolding disaster above them with interest. Legend states that the writers depicted here are Homer, Empedocles, Lucan, Horace, Ovid, Virgil, and Dante, but the identifications are disputed by modern scholars. Several small-scale grisaille medallions depicting images from their works, including the first eleven books of Dante's Purgatorio, Orpheus, Hercules, and various scenes from Ovid and Virgil, among others.

In a niche in the lower wall is shown a Pietà that contains explicit references to two important Orvietan martyr saints, S. Pietro Parenzo (podestà of Orvieto in 1199) and S. Faustino. They stand next to the dead Christ, along with Mary Magdalen and the Virgin Mary. The figure of the dead Christ, according to Giorgio Vasari, is the image of Signorelli's son Antonio, who died from the plague during the course of the execution of the paintings. This fresco was Signorelli's last work in the chapel. But Tom Henry in his book "The Life and Art of Luca Signorelli" (Yale University Press, 2012) states that Vasari's story is not correct: "Signorelli had two sons, Antonio and Tomasso. Tomasso outlived his father and Antonio was alive when this Lamentation was delivered in February 1502, dying a few months later in July 1502." (Preface, p. xiii)

== Palazzo dei Papi ==
The Papal Palace attached to the right of the cathedral was originally begun in the mid-13th century when the popes moved to Orvieto to escape conflict in Rome. Pope Urban IV and Pope Martin IV both lived in the town and probably oversaw construction of the initial stages of this building. Pope Boniface VIII extended the building, but it was left unfinished following the papal move to Avignon in 1309. It remained a papal residence until 1550, when it was passed to the ownership of the cathedral, who after using it as a residence for some time redesigned it in 1896 as a museum, which it remains today. Inside is information and artifacts detailing the history of the cathedral and town. Disused works from the cathedral interior and pieces of original construction removed during later restoration can be seen in the museum, including paintings, reliquaries and the original plans for the cathedral's construction.

The ground floor of the building also houses a museum dedicated to the Sicilian artist Emilio Greco who constructed the cathedral's bronze doors in 1970. The museum contains a wide selection of his works, as well as preparatory papers and sculptures of other large pieces, including several which are housed at St Peter's Basilica in the Vatican.

== Palazzo dell'Opera del Duomo ==
Opposite the cathedral is a large grand building constructed in 1359 to house the cathedral's administrative offices and enlarged in 1857 to create a museum on the ground floor housing Etruscan artifacts discovered around the city, which was once a major Etruscan capital. Next door to this building is the Claudio Faina museum, which houses the substantial collection of Etruscan art collected in the nineteenth century by Count Mauro Faina and bequeathed to the city.

== See also ==
- Italian Gothic architecture
- List of Gothic cathedrals in Europe
