= Ugolino di Vieri (sculptor) =

Italian sculptor (fl. 1328–1380)

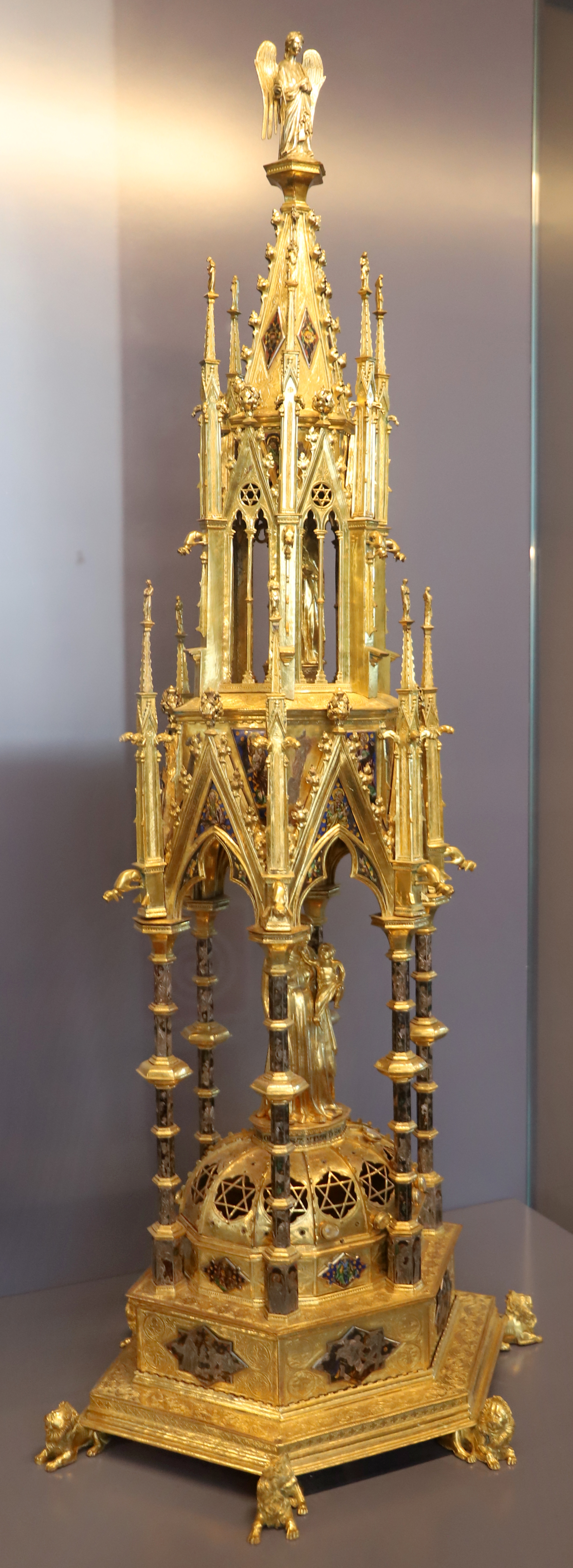
Reliquary of the skull of Saint Sabinus

Ugolino di Vieri (fl. 1328–1380) was an Italian sculptor and goldsmith born in Siena, best remembered for his masterpiece, the Reliquary of the Santo Corporale at the Orvieto Cathedral.
