= Cola Petruccioli =

Italian painter (1360–1401)

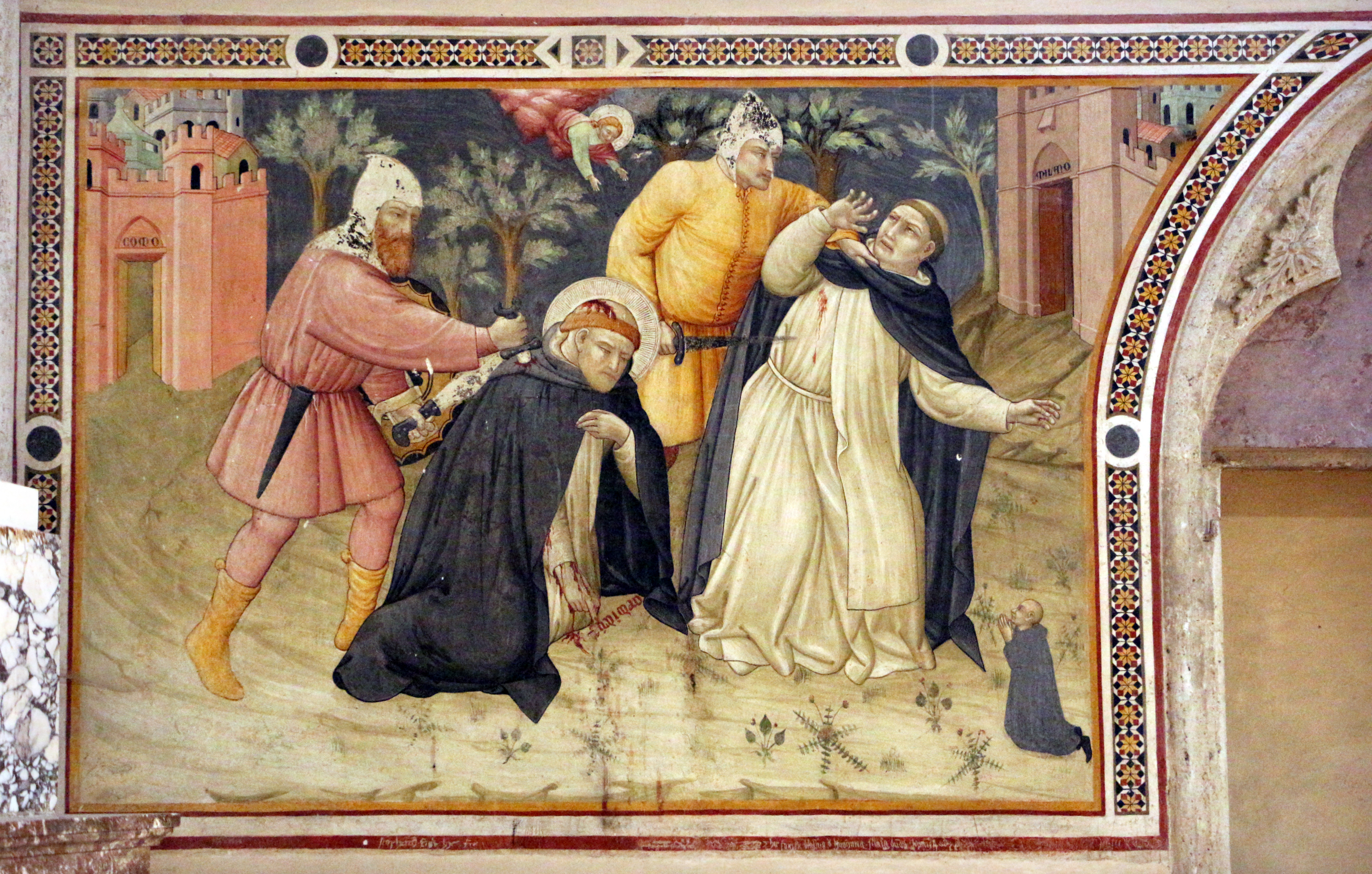
Martirio di Pietro da Verona, in San Domenico, Perugia

Cola Petruccioli (1360–1401) was an Italian painter from Orvieto in Umbria, known as an apprentice to Ugolino di Prete Ilaro, active in the period around 1400 and contemporary of the Sienese School.

His works are seen in the Cathedral of Assisi, as well as in the Capella de Corporale in Orvieto. In Cetona he painted frescoes of Virgin Mary in the Franciscan Hermitage, Convento di Santa Maria a Belverde. These are shown in Enzo Carli's Gli Affreschi di Belverde. (Edam, Florence, 1977). He painted a diptych the contains an Annuciation and a Crucifixion (1395), displayed in the Pinacoteca Civica of the town of Spello. He died in Perugia.
