= Orvieto and the popes =

13th-century pope refuge

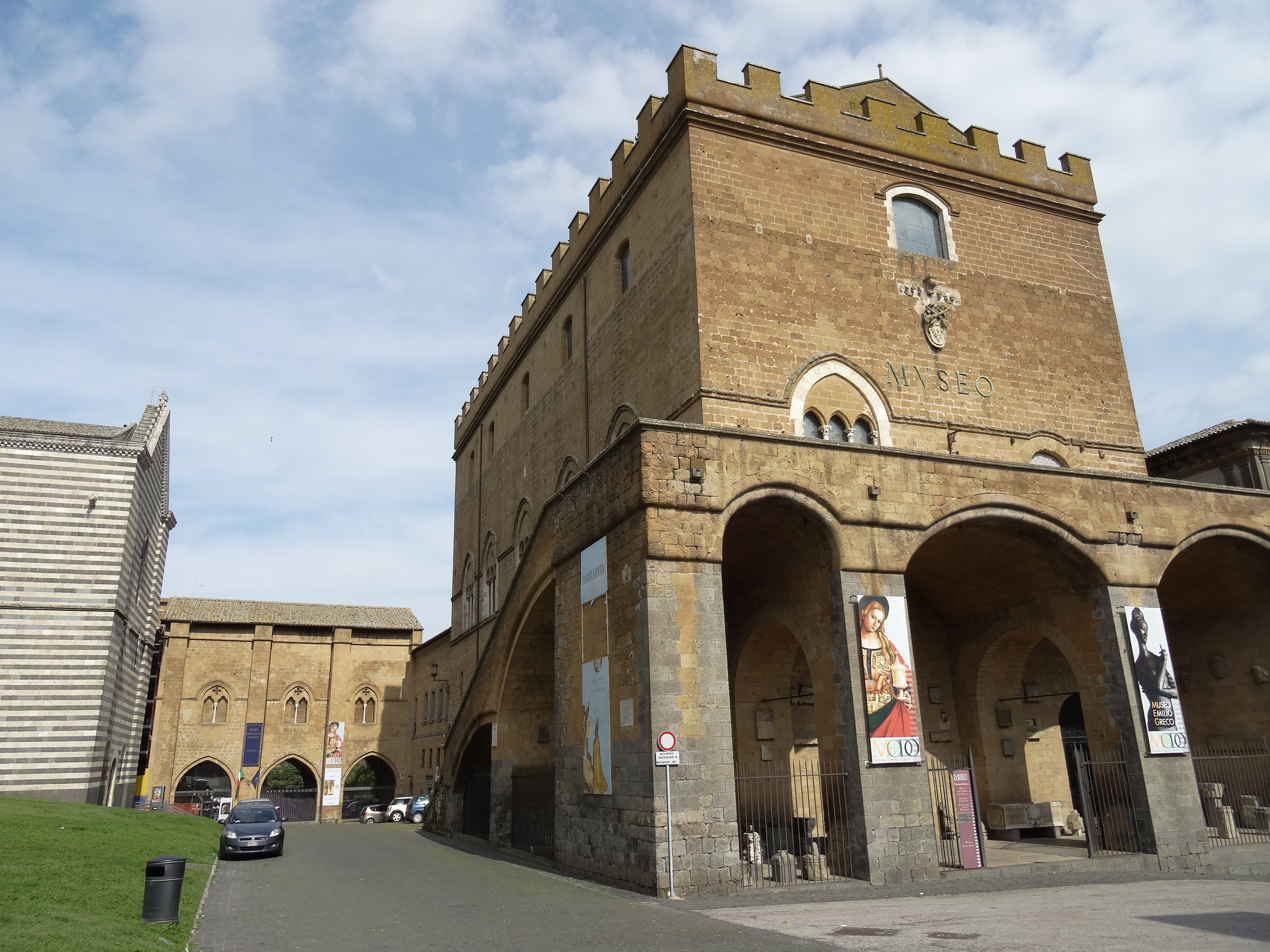
The papal palace of Orvieto

Orvieto, Umbria, Italy, was the refuge of five popes during the 13th century: Urban IV (1261–1264), Gregory X (1271–1276), Martin IV (1281–1285), Nicholas IV (1288–1292) and Boniface VIII (1294–1303). During this time, the popes took up residence in the Papal Palace of Orvieto (also known as Palazzo Soliano), which was adjacent to the Orvieto Cathedral and expanded onto the bishop's residence. None of these popes died in Orvieto, and thus no papal elections took place in there, nor are there any papal tombs.

Political and strategic reasons motivated the frequent moves of the pope and Roman Curia during this period, and other destinations include Viterbo and Perugia. Urban IV and Martin IV resided in both Viterbo and Orvieto. During the period from the reign of Nicholas IV to Benedict XI (1303–1304), Orvieto hosted the pope more frequently than Rome.

Art historian Gary M. Radke notes that "the papal palaces in Viterbo and Orvieto are the most extensive thirteenth-century papal palaces to survive to our own day." He dates the frescoes in the palace to the 1290s, during the reign of Nicholas IV or Boniface VIII. They display naturalistic impulses in the Gothic style.

== Background ==
The city is mentioned in the writings of Gregory I (590–604). Adrian IV (1154–59) was the first pope to spend significant time in Orvieto. According to the Catholic Encyclopedia, "on account of its position, Orvieto was often chosen by the popes as a place of refuge and Adrian IV fortified it." His successor, Innocent III (1198–1216), was a militant opponent of the Cathar heresy, which had infiltrated the city, and took measures to eradicate that heresy; Innocent III sent Pietro Parenzo to govern the city, who was quickly martyred. In 1227, Gregory IX (1227–1241) confirmed the Dominican studium generale in Orvieto, a school of theology, one of the first in Europe.

== History ==
The palace was expanded during the reign of Urban IV (1261–1264), but the "northwest hall must have been built earlier." Urban IV was French and had been crowned in Viterbo, but spent most of his papacy in Orvieto. The structure became a papal palace during Urban IV's two-year stay in Orvieto, starting October 18, 1262, although it may not have been completed until Gregory X (1271–1276) took up residence there on July 26, 1272. Urban began construction in 1263, the year he consecrated a new Dominican church in Orvieto. The first mention of the papal palace in contemporary documents dates to April 1, 1273.

Martin IV (1281–1285) was in Orvieto between March 23, 1281 and June 24, 1282, and then nearby in Montefiascone in the summer and fall of 1282. He returned to Orvieto from December 25, 1282 until June 27, 1284. He likely chose to reside in his fortress in Montefiascone while the Orvieto residence was being expanded. The modern Cathedral of Orvieto itself was begun in 1285.

Nicholas IV (1288–1292) was in Orvieto from June 13, 1290 to October 19, 1291. Although Nicholas IV was Roman by birth, he brought the Curia with him to Orvieto. Nicholas IV was elected Podestà and Capitano del Popolo of Orvieto, the first pope to hold civic offices in the city. Boniface VIII (1294–1303) arrived in Orvieto on June 6, 1297 and left that same month. During his stay, the Commune placed his coat of arms on the Palazzo del Capitano del Popolo, erected statues of him on two gates of the city, and unveiled frescoes on the gates and paintings inside the Palazzo del Populo. Boniface VIII was elected Capitano and Podestà in 1297, and Capitano again in 1298.

== Later papal ties ==
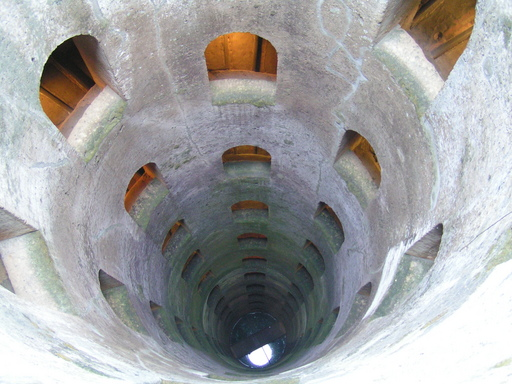
Pozzo di San Patrizio

Nicholas V (1447–55) in a 1449 letter gave money for the restoration of the Episcopal Palace and authorized Fra Angelico to begin painting in the Cappella Nuova of the Cathedral.

During the Sack of Rome (1527), Clement VII (1523–1534) took refuge at Orvieto. Preparing for a possible siege of the city, he ordered the Pozzo di San Patrizio ("Well of St. Patrick) constructed by architect-engineer Antonio da Sangallo the Younger. Of course, the pope and emperor had reconciled long before the well was completed. Clement returned to Rome on 10 December 1533, but died less than a year later. Sixtus V (1585–1590) drained the swamps around the city.

Ownership of the palace passed from the pope to the cathedral in 1550, and the structure became the National Archaeological Museum of Orvieto in 1896. According to the Catholic Encyclopedia, "in the palace of the popes, built by Boniface VIII, is the civic museum, which contains Etruscan antiquities and works of art that are, for the greater part, from the cathedral."
