= Palazzo Baldassini =

Coordinates: 41°54′02″N 12°28′32″E

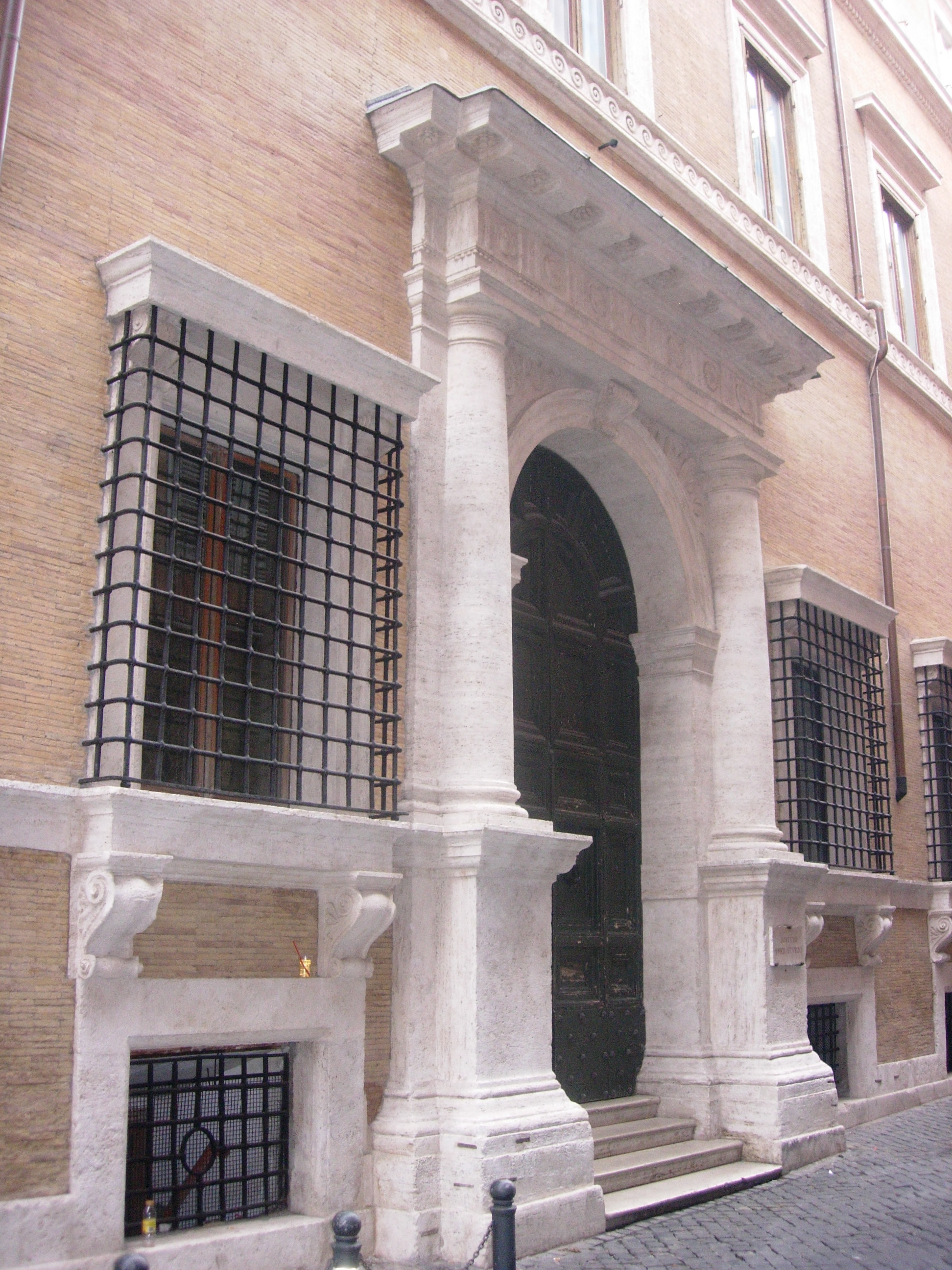
- Gate of Palazzo Baldassini
- Interactive map of the Palazzo Baldassini area

General information
- Architectural style: Renaissance
- Location: Rome, Italy

Design and construction
- Architect: Antonio da Sangallo the Younger

Palazzo Baldassini is a palace in Rome, Italy, designed by the Renaissance architect Antonio da Sangallo the Younger in about 1516–1519. It was designed for the papal jurist from Naples, Melchiorre Baldassini. The ground floor was used for shops or workshops, and the piano nobile consisted of private apartments.

The interior was frescoed by Giovanni da Udine, Perin del Vaga, Polidoro da Caravaggio and Maturino da Firenze.

== History and description ==
It is a stately residence built at the behest of the jurist Melchiorre Baldassini, who held numerous positions within the Apostolic Chancery and, between 1515 and 1518, commissioned its design from Antonio da Sangallo the Younger, who until then had been an assistant at the construction site of St. Peter’s Basilica.
