= Viterbo Papacy =

13th-century period of the papacy

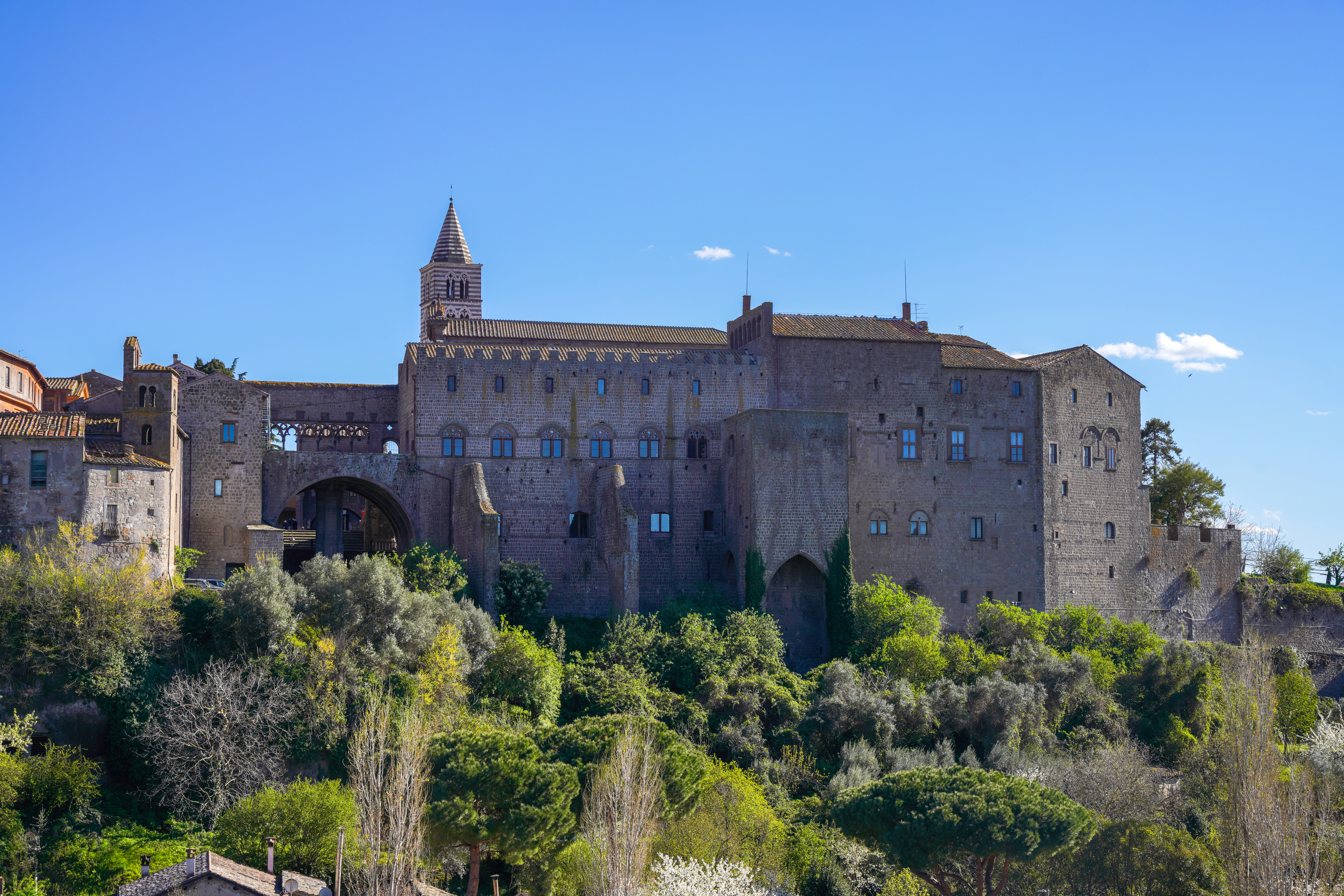
The Papal Palace in Viterbo

With a long history as a vantage point for the forces of anti-popes threatening Rome, Viterbo became a papal city in 1243. During the later thirteenth century, the ancient Italian city of Viterbo was the site of five papal elections and the residence of seven popes and their Curias, and it remains the location of four papal tombs. These popes resided in the Palazzo dei Papi di Viterbo alongside the Viterbo Cathedral intermittently for two decades, from 1257 to 1281; as a result, the papal palace in Viterbo, with that in Orvieto, are the most extensive thirteenth-century papal palaces to have survived.

Shifting political and economic alliances pushed and pulled various popes of that century from Rome, taking refuge in other, not invariably hospitable, Italian city-states like Perugia and Orvieto. The primary cleavage in these divisions was between the Angevin and Hohenstaufen claimants to the title of Holy Roman Emperor, whom the pope could crown.

== Prior papal connections ==
According to the Catholic Encyclopedia article on Viterbo, "during the twelfth and thirteenth centuries the city several times afforded the popes an asylum." Pope Paschal II (1099–1118) was brought to Viterbo as a prisoner in 1111, and when Pope Hadrian IV (1154–1159) met with Frederick Barbarossa in the city in 1155, the city was firmly in the Emperor's hands.

Antipopes Paschal III (1164–1168) and Callixtus III (1168–1178) took shelter in Viterbo, where the nobility had Ghibelline loyalties, but—according to the Catholic Encyclopedia—much of the populace remained loyal to Pope Alexander III. Viterbo rebelled against the Emperor after the peace between pope and Emperor was concluded.

Pope Innocent III (1198–1216) issued a papal bull from Viterbo in 1214. Viterbo remained loyal to Frederick II, Holy Roman Emperor, and refused to admit Pope Gregory IX in 1232. A series of sieges brought the city back and forth between Guelf and Ghibelline loyalty.

== Overview ==
Residential Popes

Viterbo was the residence of five popes who died there:

- Pope Alexander IV (1254–1261)
- Pope Clement IV (1265–1268)
- Pope Adrian V (1276)
- Pope John XXI (1276–1277)
- Pope Nicholas III (1277–1280)

Two other popes temporarily resided in Viterbo for a time but moved elsewhere before their death:

- Pope Urban IV (1261–1264)
- Pope Martin IV (1281–1285)

Elections

Viterbo was the site of five papal elections:

- Papal election, 1261
- Papal election, 1268–1271 (Viterbo Cathedral)
- Papal election, September 1276 (Viterbo Cathedral)
- Papal election, 1277
- Papal election, 1280–1281 (Viterbo Cathedral)

None of these conformed to the formality of the papal conclave, although several were instrumental in the development of the norms of the conclave.

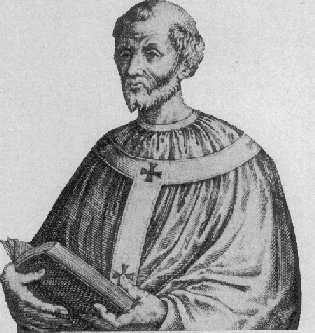
Pope Alexander IV
(1254–1261)

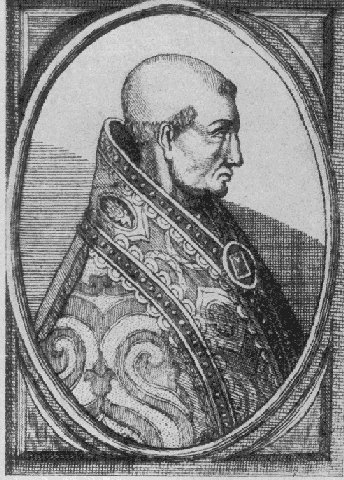
Pope Urban IV
(1261–1264)

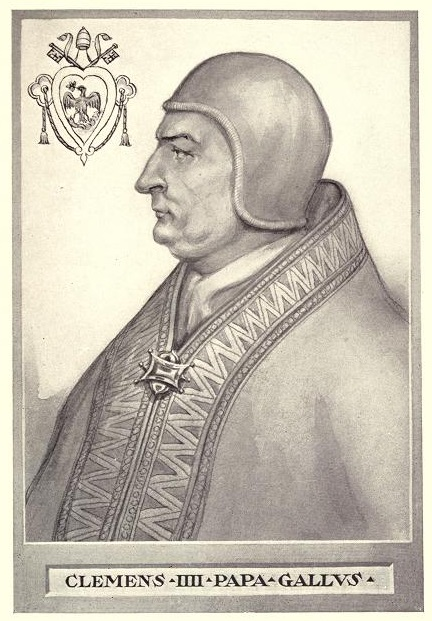
Pope Clement IV
(1265–1268)

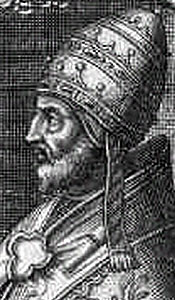
Pope Adrian V (1276)

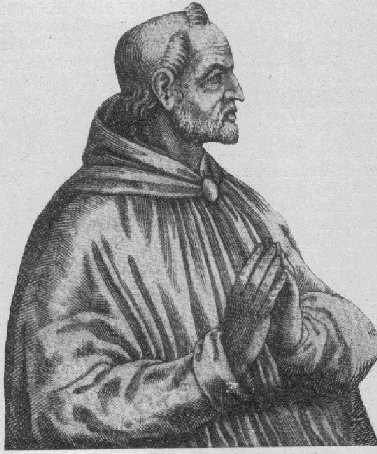
Pope John XXI
(1276–1277)

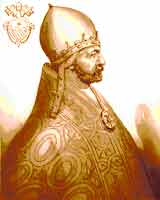
Pope Nicholas III
(1277–1280)

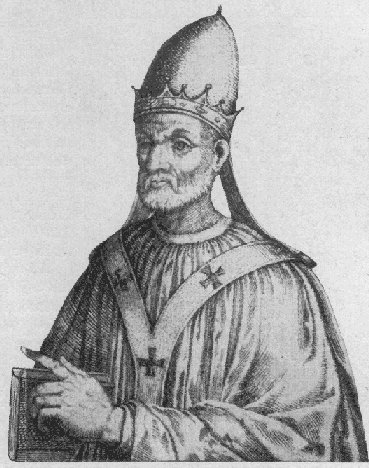
Pope Martin IV
(1281–1285)

== History ==
Pope Alexander IV was elected in Naples in December 1254. He inherited his predecessor's opposition to the Hohenstaufen claimants to the Holy Roman Empire. Because of the strength of the Ghibelline faction in Rome, he withdrew to Viterbo in 1257 until his death in 1261. Alexander IV began enlarging the bishop's residence by the cathedral, and the Papal Palace was completed probably in 1266.

Alexander IV's successor, Pope Urban IV, returned to Viterbo from the Crusades and was present there when Alexander IV died. A non-cardinal, Urban IV moved to Perugia upon his election, where he died. Urban IV spent the winter and spring of 1261–1262 in Viterbo.

Urban IV's successor, Pope Clement IV, was elected in Perugia, but established himself in Viterbo, where he remained until his death. Clement IV established permanent residence in Viterbo in 1266. He did not even return to Rome for the crowning of Charles of Anjou as the Holy Roman Emperor by the College of Cardinals.

The election after Clement IV's death, in Viterbo, lasted three years. Pope Gregory X, a non-cardinal away on the Crusades, was finally elected. Gregory X returned to Rome, and died in Arezzo, while returning from the Second Council of Lyon. in France. His successor, Pope Innocent V also resided in Rome.

Pope Adrian V was pope for a little over a month, and accomplished little other than dying in Viterbo before even being ordained a priest. His Portuguese successor, Pope John XXI remained in Viterbo. John XXI expanded the papal palace in Viterbo, and died when a section of the roof collapsed on him.

The next pope, Pope Nicholas III, although from the powerful Roman Orsini family, also died in Viterbo in 1280. During the ensuing election, the magistrates of Viterbo threw two Orsini cardinals into prison. By the time his successor, Pope Martin IV, was elected, Viterbo had been placed under interdict, and because the French pope was resented in Rome, he was crowned in Orvieto. The influence of Viterbo on the papacy declined after Martin IV's death in Perugia in 1285.

Pope Pius II was in Viterbo in 1462 to celebrate the feast of Corpus Christi.

== Architecture ==
=== Papal palace ===
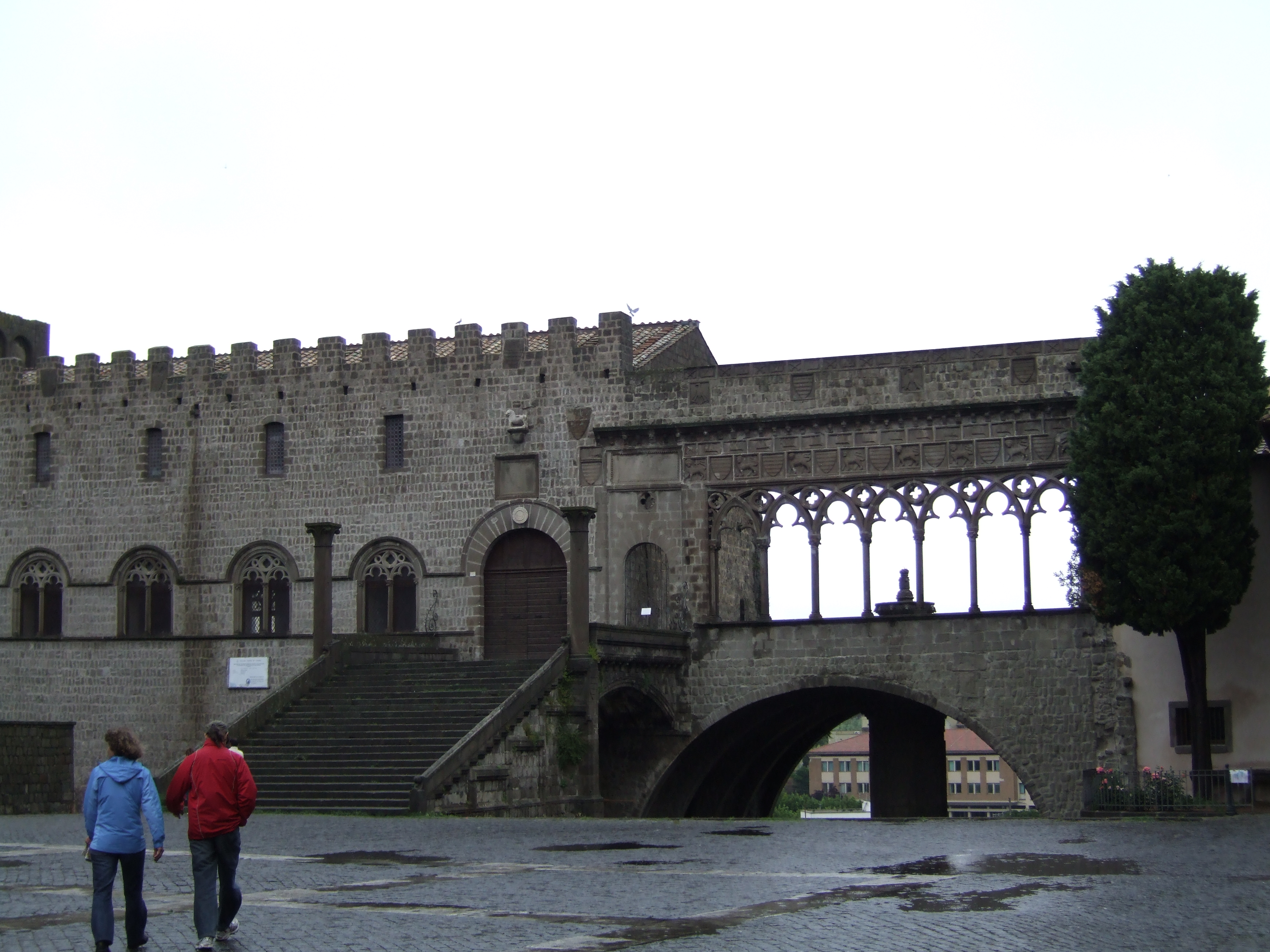
The loggia of the papal palace

The palace at Viterbo had been the residence of the Bishop of Viterbo until the 1250s. Alexander IV (1254–1261) enlarged the palace for use as a papal residence. A large three-storied addition was completed in 1266, during the reign of Clement IV (1264–1268). The palace was redecorated in the 1290s, and some of the new additions bear the Caetani coat-of-arms of Pope Boniface VIII (1294–1303). According to Prof. Radke, although Boniface VIII never even visited Viterbo during his papacy, "the papal arms indicate that the structure had not completely lost its papal associations."

According to Prof. Radke, "the papal palaces in Viterbo and Orvieto are the most extensive thirteenth-century papal palaces to survive to our own day." Radke dates a series of frescoes in the palace to its enlargement during the residence of Clement IV (1264–1268).

=== Papal tombs ===
Four popes were buried in Viterbo:

- Alexander IV (destroyed in 1490)
- Clement IV (extant, S. Francesco)
- Adrian V (extant, S. Francesco)
- John XXI (extant, Viterbo Cathedral)
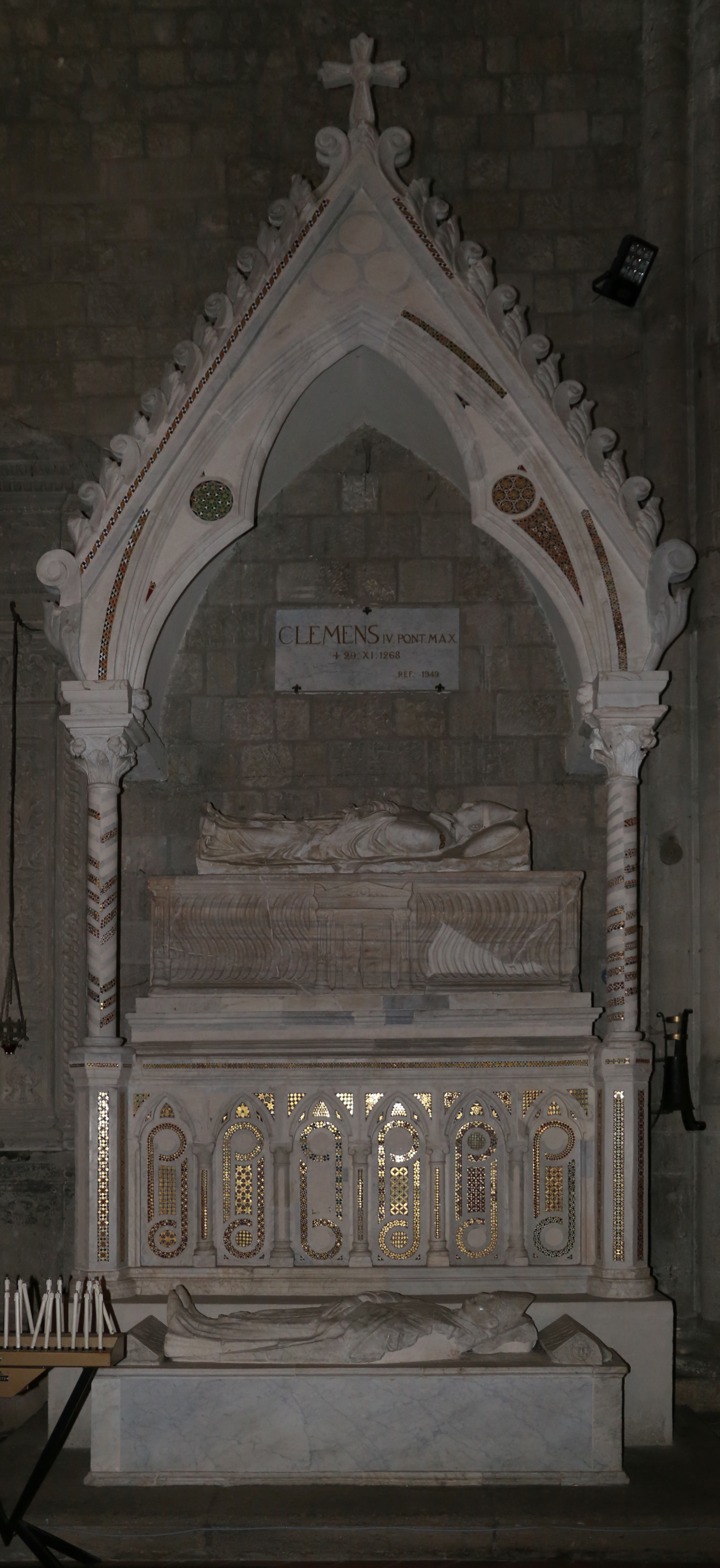
Tomb of Clement IV in
S. Francesco

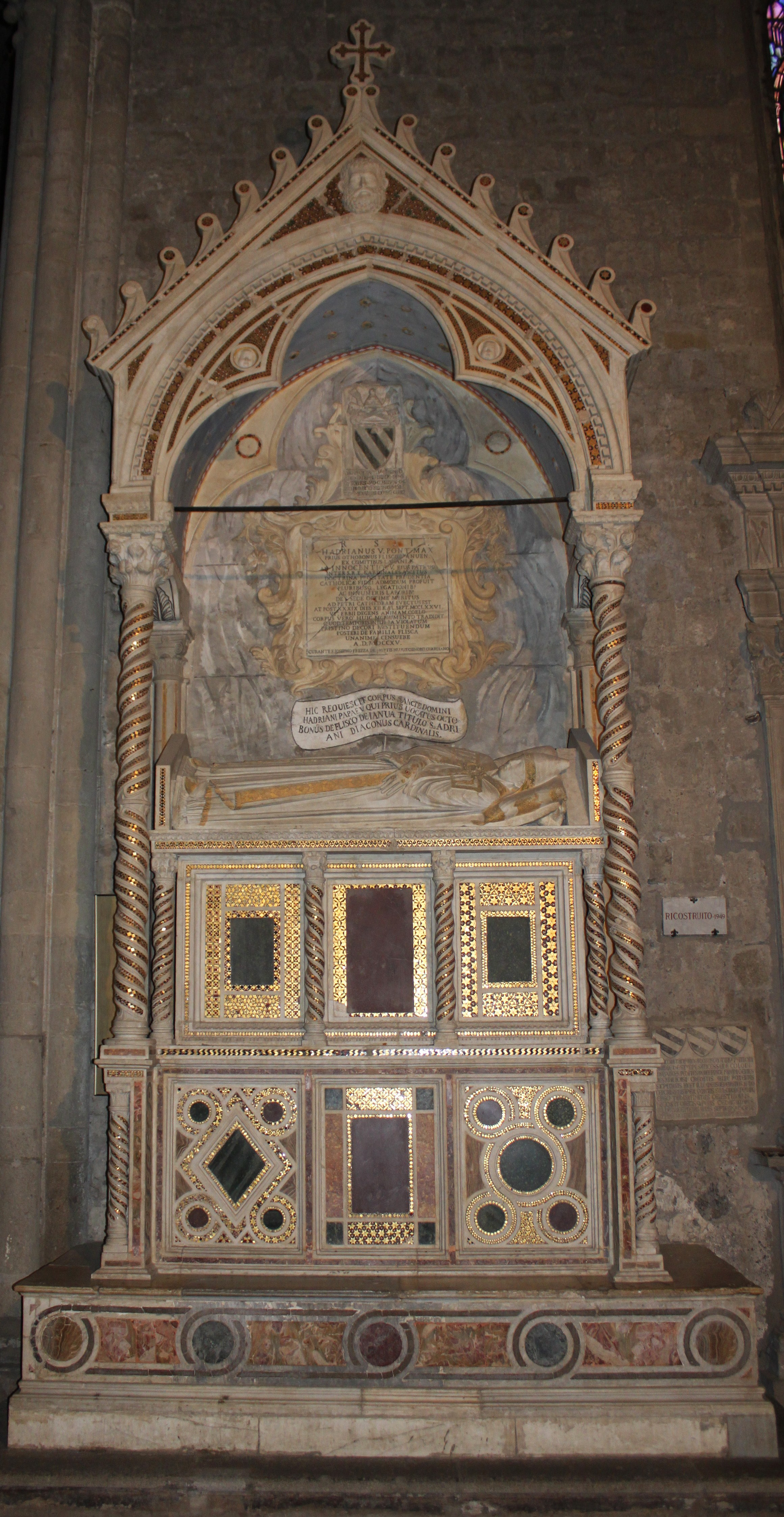
Tomb of Adrian V in
S. Francesco

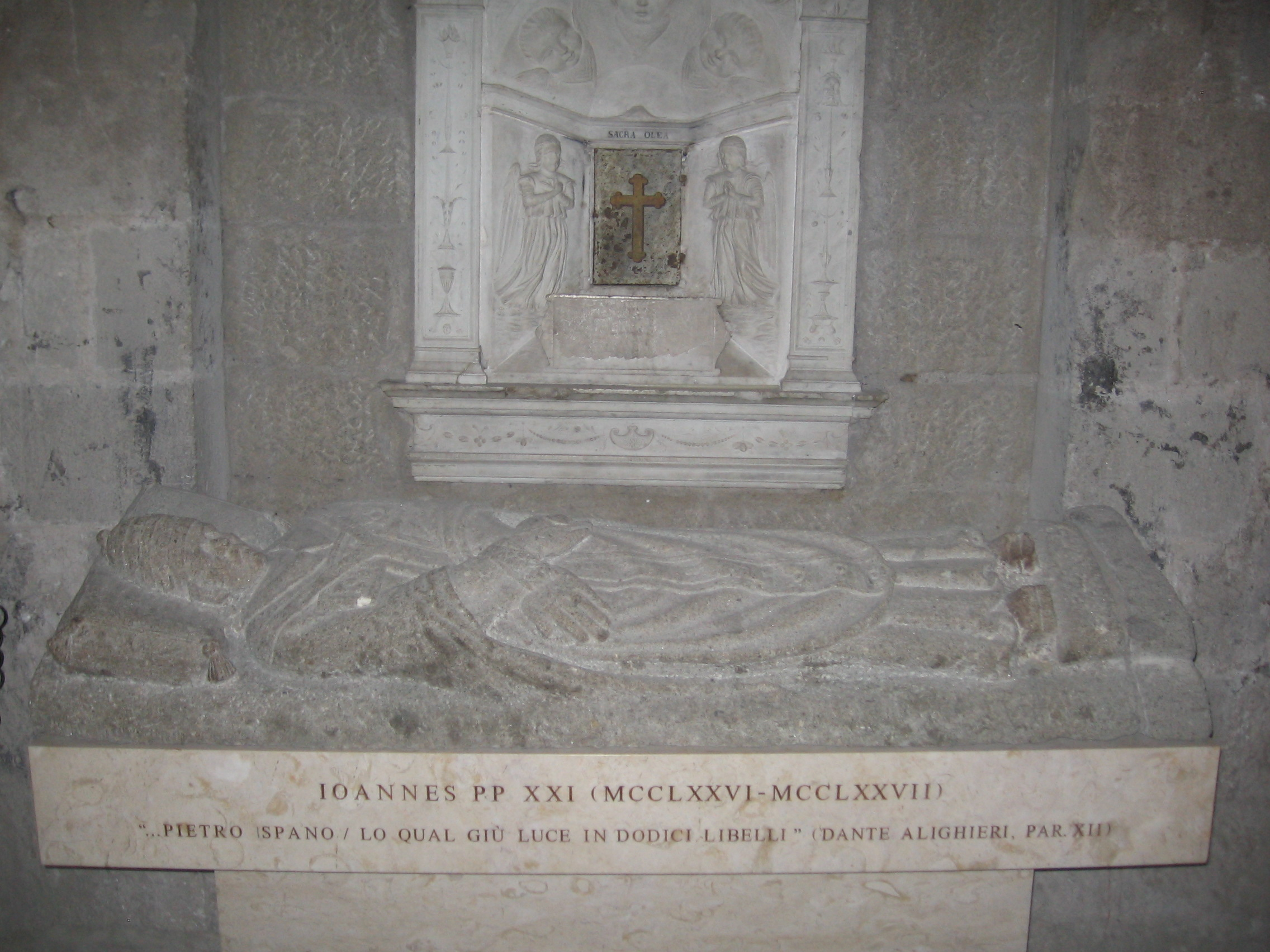
Tomb of John XXI in Viterbo Cathedral

Nicholas III, from the powerful Roman Orsini family, was returned to Old St. Peter's Basilica for burial.
