= Antonio da Sangallo the Younger =

Italian architect (1484–1546)

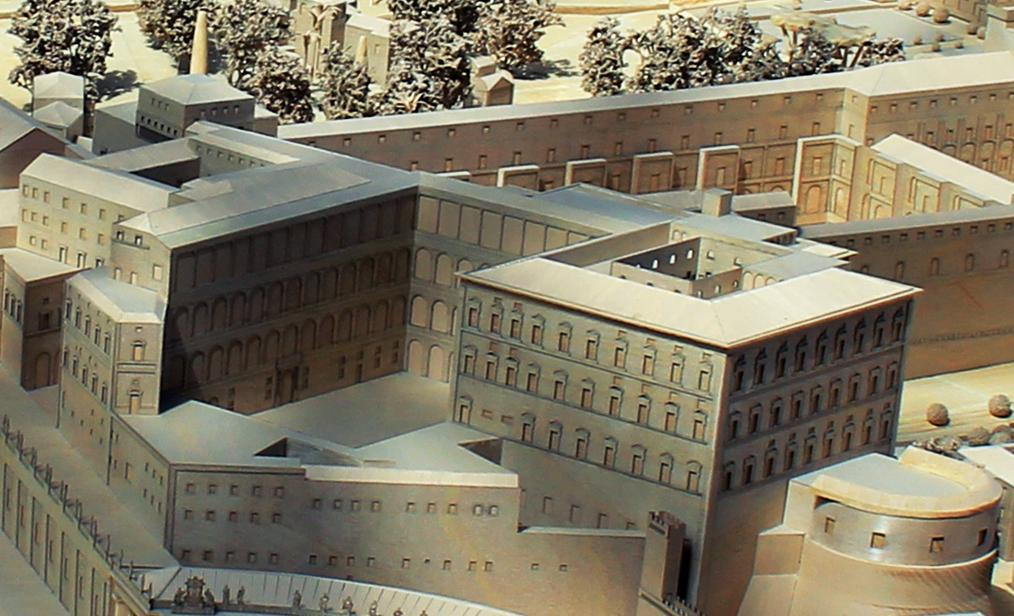
A model of the Apostolic Palace, which was the main project of Bramante during Sangallo's apprenticeship.

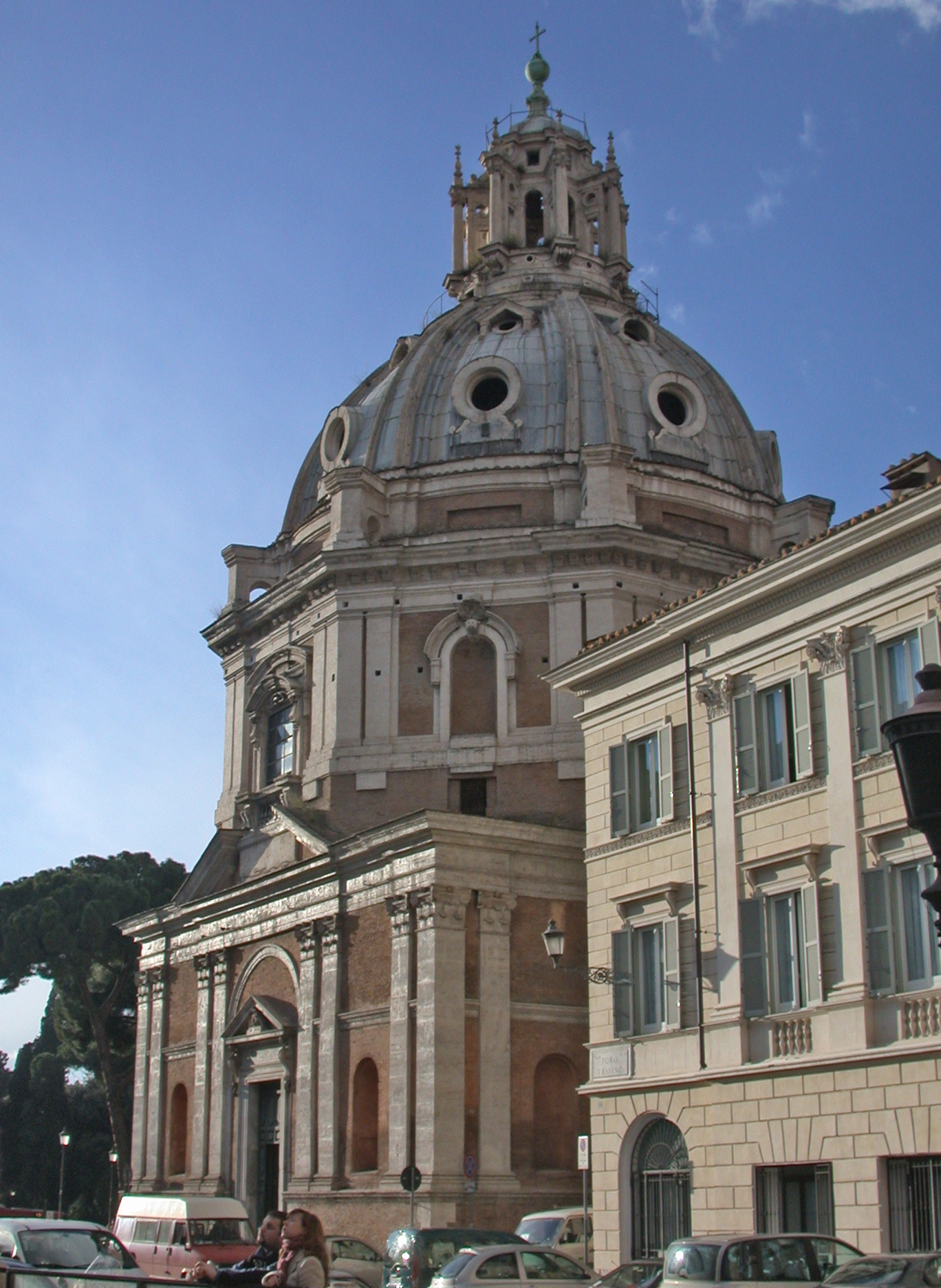
The church of Santa Maria di Loreto near the Trajan's Market in Rome.

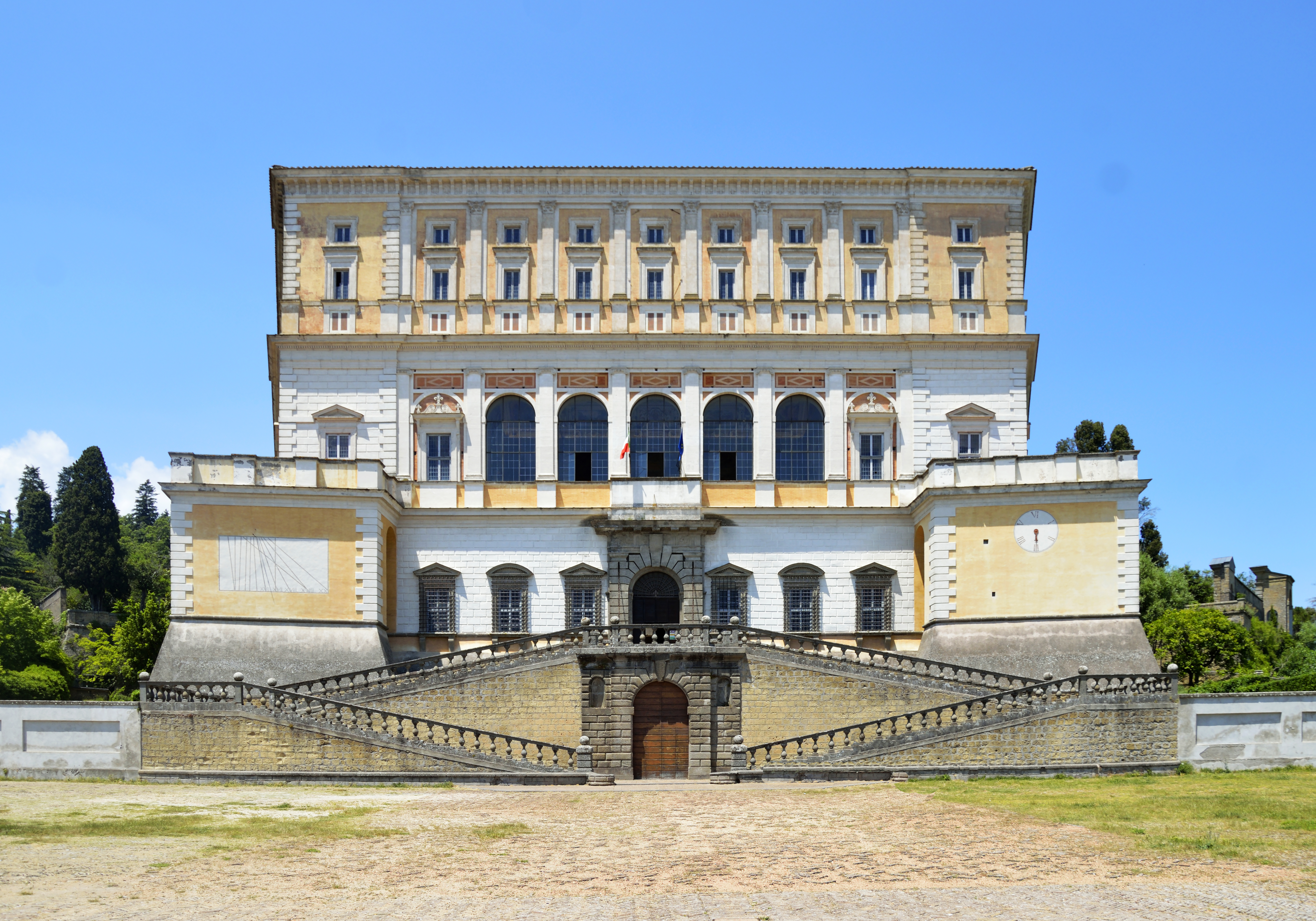
The Villa Farnese in Caprarola; the initial design was by Sangallo and Baldassare Peruzzi.

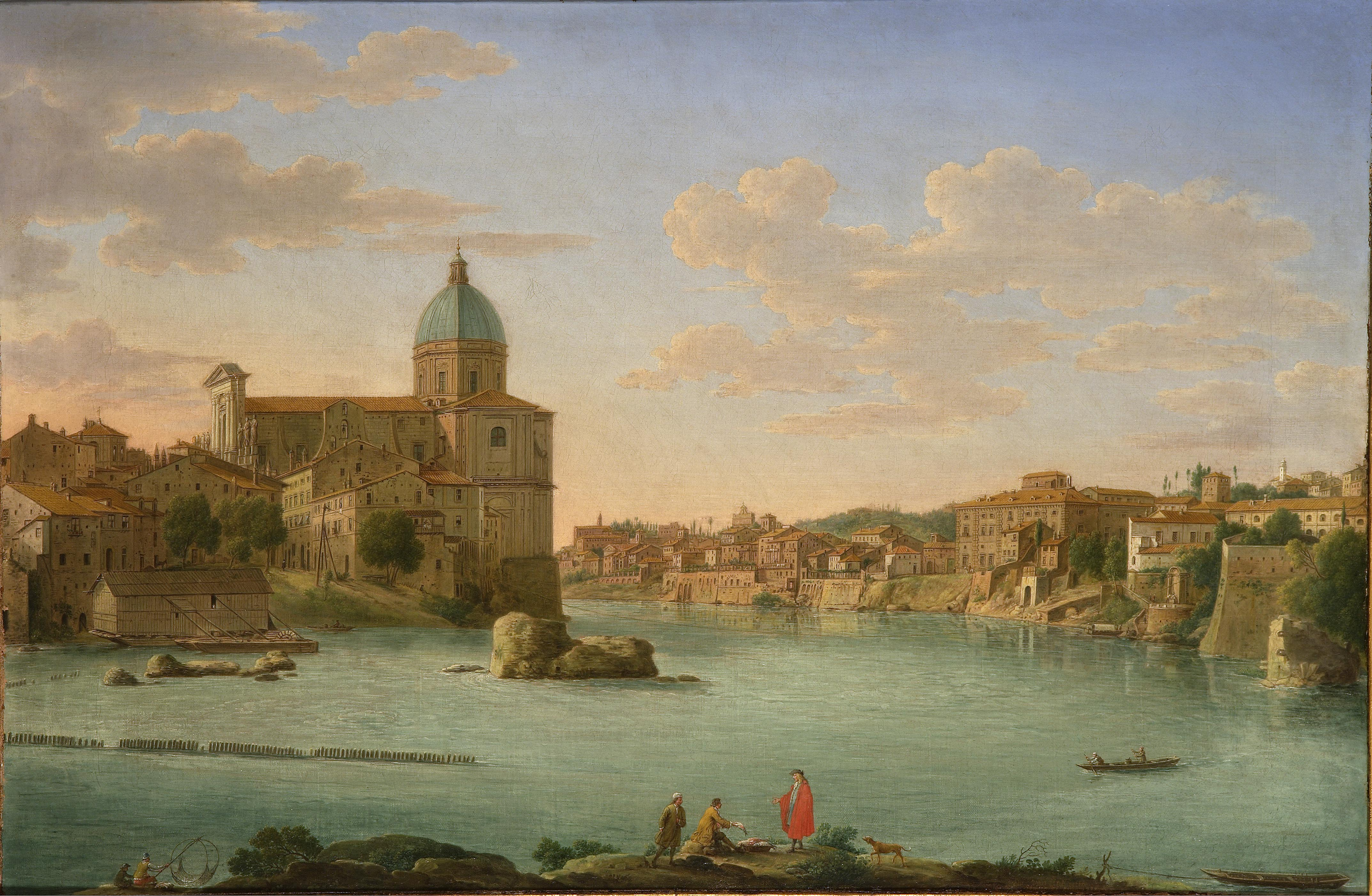
San Giovanni dei Fiorentini; Sangallo was responsible for the foundation projecting out into the Tiber.

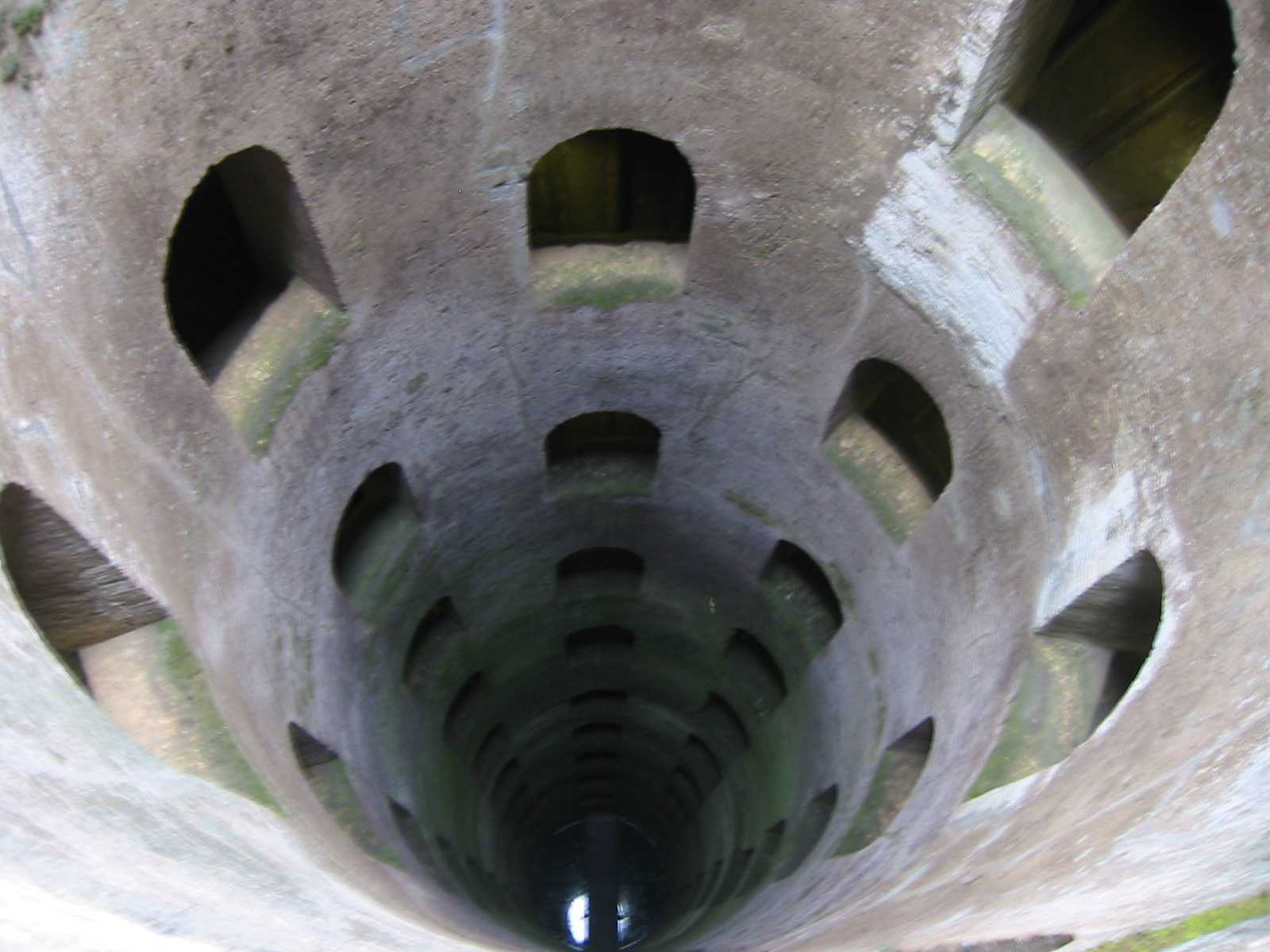
View of St. Patrick's Well in Orvieto.

Antonio da Sangallo the Younger (12 April 1484 – 3 August 1546), also known as Antonio Cordiani, was an Italian architect active during the Renaissance, mainly in Rome and the Papal States. He worked on the design of St. Peter's Basilica in the Vatican City, and was also an engineer who restored several buildings. His success was greatly due to his contracts with renowned artists during his time. Sangallo died in Terni, Italy, and was buried in St. Peter’s Basilica.

== Early life and apprenticeship ==
Sangallo was born Antonio Cordiani in Florence, the son of Bartolomeo Piccioni. His grandfather Francesco Giamberti was a woodworker, and his uncles Giuliano and Antonio da Sangallo were noted architects of the time. Despite his family ties, Cordiani spent his early life in poverty, resulting from the political and religious turmoil of the fifteenth century. At around age twenty, in 1503, young Cordiani followed his uncles to Rome in order to pursue a career in architecture; he ended up taking the name ″Sangallo″ and then becomes known as Antonio da Sangallo (the younger). Instead of becoming an apprentice to an artist, his apprenticeship consisted of doing carpentry work. After about three years, he began working with Donato Bramante in 1506.

As an assistant to Bramante, Sangallo prepared a number of sketches due to the disability of his master. Bramante valued Sangallo as a draftsman and allowed Sangallo to do the design work for some of his minor projects. Due to his success, Sangallo was eventually put in charge of the Passetto di Borgo between the Papal apartments and the Castel Sant'Angelo. That particular project was left unfinished, but it left Sangallo with a working reputation as an architect.

== Independent commissions ==
Sangallo quickly received a major commission for the church of Santa Maria di Loreto in 1507. His design called for a square first story and an octagonal second story built in travertine and brick; the dome and lantern were finished many years later. Although Leo X's papacy enabled Sangallo to connect with great artists, his main encouragement came from Cardinal Alessandro Farnese (later Pope Paul III). Sangallo received what was likely his first independent commission from Farnese. This piece was the fortress of Capodimonte, set on Lake Bolsena in Italy. Following this was the renovation of a home on the Campo dei Fiori in Rome, later known as the Palazzo Farnese. Although it was not completed until after his death, this palace became one of the most important in Rome, with its structure influencing a later code of academic rules. This palace was what established Sangallo as a mature architect. Sangallo also received a number of further contracts from the Farnese family. For example, he designed a palace (since destroyed) and the Church of Santa Maria Maddalena in the Farnese town of Gradoli. He also designed fortifications for Capo di Monte and Caprarola; the latter eventually became a country estate known as the Villa Farnese.

In addition to the Farnese family, Sangallo had a number of patrons in Rome. He designed the Palazzo Baldassini near the Basilica of Sant'Agostino for Melchiore Baldassini. Additionally, he designed a tomb for the Cardinal Jaume Serra i Cau in San Giacomo degli Spagnoli. Sangallo was also one of several artists hired to design the Villa Madama by Cardinal Giulio de' Medici, the future Clement VII; he was personally responsible for the final design of the building itself. Although he was obligated to his patrons, he always imposed his own style on his projects. Through these projects, Sangallo acquired the reputation of a master architect in the city of Rome, mostly due to his originality and personal style. When Bramante died in 1514, Sangallo, along with Raphael and Giovanni Giocondo, was appointed to oversee the construction of St. Peter's Basilica by Pope Leo X. Sangallo was hired extensively by Leo X, not only as an architect, but also as an engineer tasked to restore and save a number of buildings.

== Architectural influences ==
While he was working with Raphael on Saint Peter's Basilica, Sangallo had to compromise, but also search to find his own architectural style. He was influenced by other architects of the time, but his main influence and advantage had come from observing the work of his uncles and father at a young age. He likely learned arithmetic and Latin at this time, which would influence his complicated calculations in his later projects. Sangallo had much more thorough training in draftsmanship and carpentry than many other Renaissance architects. This allowed him to ultimately develop a unique, methodical style, as seen in the geometrical patterns common in his work.

Sangallo was influenced by architecture, but also the Italian Renaissance as an artistic time period in which he lived. Even so, he remained highly critical of the Renaissance. Likewise, he was both influenced by and also critical of ancient Roman buildings, including the Pantheon. He practiced "operative criticism," which looked at architecture through a historical and societal lens. This allowed him to appreciate the works he was studying, but also criticize the drawings for their distorted proportions. Antonio was influenced by ancient works because they inspired him to create more accurate drawings.

== The Sangallo Circle ==
Antonio da Sangallo selected a group of highly qualified designers to assist him with his projects. This group initially included Antonio Labacco (b. 1495-d. 1567), his brother Giovanni Battista da Sangallo (b. 1496-d. 1548), and his cousin Giovan Francesco da Sangllo (b. 1485-d. 1530). After the year 1530, more people joined his group, which included Bartolomeo Baronimo and Giovan Francesco’s brother Sebastiano also known as Aristotile. The members of the Sangallo circle had a variety of experiences and skills that ranged from building tools, pumps, and mills to building entire canals, buildings, and even moving the Vatican obelisk. Sangallo made sure that he always had control over his group, by visiting and surveying all the construction sites he and his group worked on collaboratively. His colleagues sent him architectural drawings for approval and got upset when they did not include sufficient information.

== Design methods ==
Antonio da Sangallo incorporated mathematics into his design and preferred using the orthogonal mode of representation instead of making section and perspective drawings.

Antonio designed his projects in six stages. The first stage consisted of measuring the site and existing structures that were going to be affected. Then he collaborated with his patrons funding the project to draw sketches of ideas not to scale. The third stage was making the sketches of plans and elevations. After drawing these sketches, he developed them further to make detailed plan, section, and elevation drawings to present to the patrons. The fifth stage consisted of making wooden presentation models and detailed drawings for spaces such as atriums, stairwells, and windows of the building. The final stage was preparing the working drawings on 1:1 scale to instruct the construction workers on how to build his design.

== Engineering feats ==
Sangallo was eventually hired to build the foundation for the church of San Giovanni dei Fiorentini on the bank of the Tiber. Jacopo Sansovino's design called for the church to extend into the river, a difficult task given the unstable bank. Sangallo successfully completed the foundation, although at such great expense that there was no longer enough money to build the church. Although the model that Sangallo designed for the church was never built, the construction of Giacomo della Porta's designs began later, in 1583.

Another project was the Basilica della Santa Casa in Loreto. The church had not originally been built well, with cracking vaults and an unstable foundation. Sangallo redesigned the church and shored up the foundations; Vasari claims the church to be ″the best that Antonio ever executed″ despite the challenges innate in rebuilding a church as opposed to building a new one from the ground up. Sangallo was also hired to do similar work on the Vatican loggias, which had shown signs of weakness due to poor construction; his reinforcements stand today.

Sangallo was also a noted military architect, working on the fortifications of numerous cities such as Parma, Piacenza, Ancona and Orvieto. In Orvieto, he was also tasked by Pope Clement VII with building a well, called Saint Patrick's Well, noted as a marvel of engineering. Its double-helix ramps around a central open shaft allowed oxen carrying water to go down via one of the ramps and up via the other without having to turn around. Despite its 175-foot depth, the ramps are well lit through windows cut into the centre section. Possibly an inspiration for the design, the Well of Joseph in the Cairo Citadel also featured a double spiral staircase.

== Mechanical drawings ==
Besides architecture and structural engineering, Antonio da Sangallo the Younger was also interested in mechanical engineering. He was interested in studying pulleys and drew many plans of different types of mechanisms using a straight edge and compasses between the years of 1527 and 1532. Some of these drawings of mechanisms include part of a silk-spinning wheel, a fulling mill for the cloth industry, and a large circular mill with four pairs of cogwheel lanterns. Antonio also sketched new mechanisms that he imagined such as a gristmill powered by horses moving a tread wheel and another drawing shows a tread wheel mechanism that drives four mills simultaneously with a single shaft and two men.

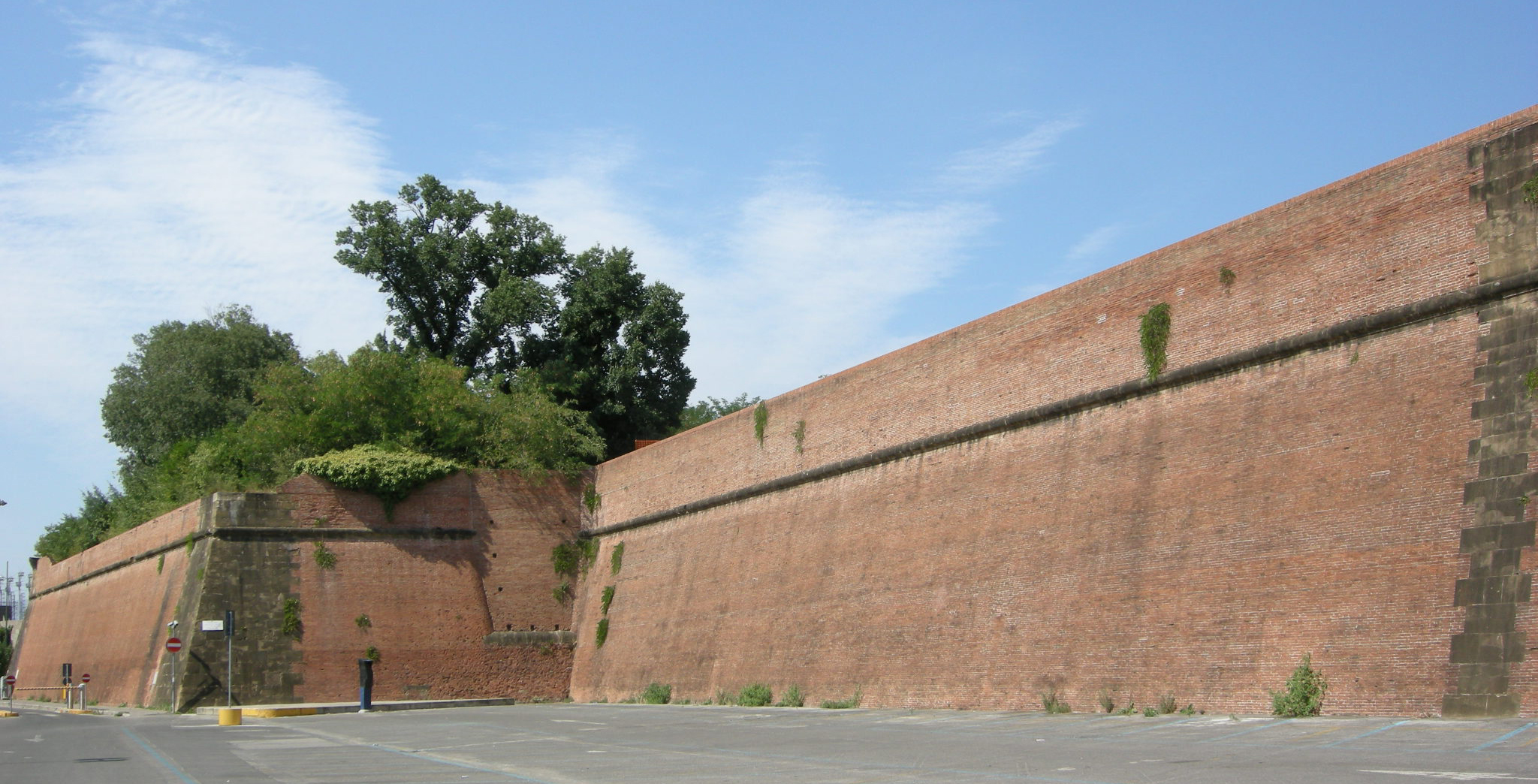
Florence: Fortezza da basso

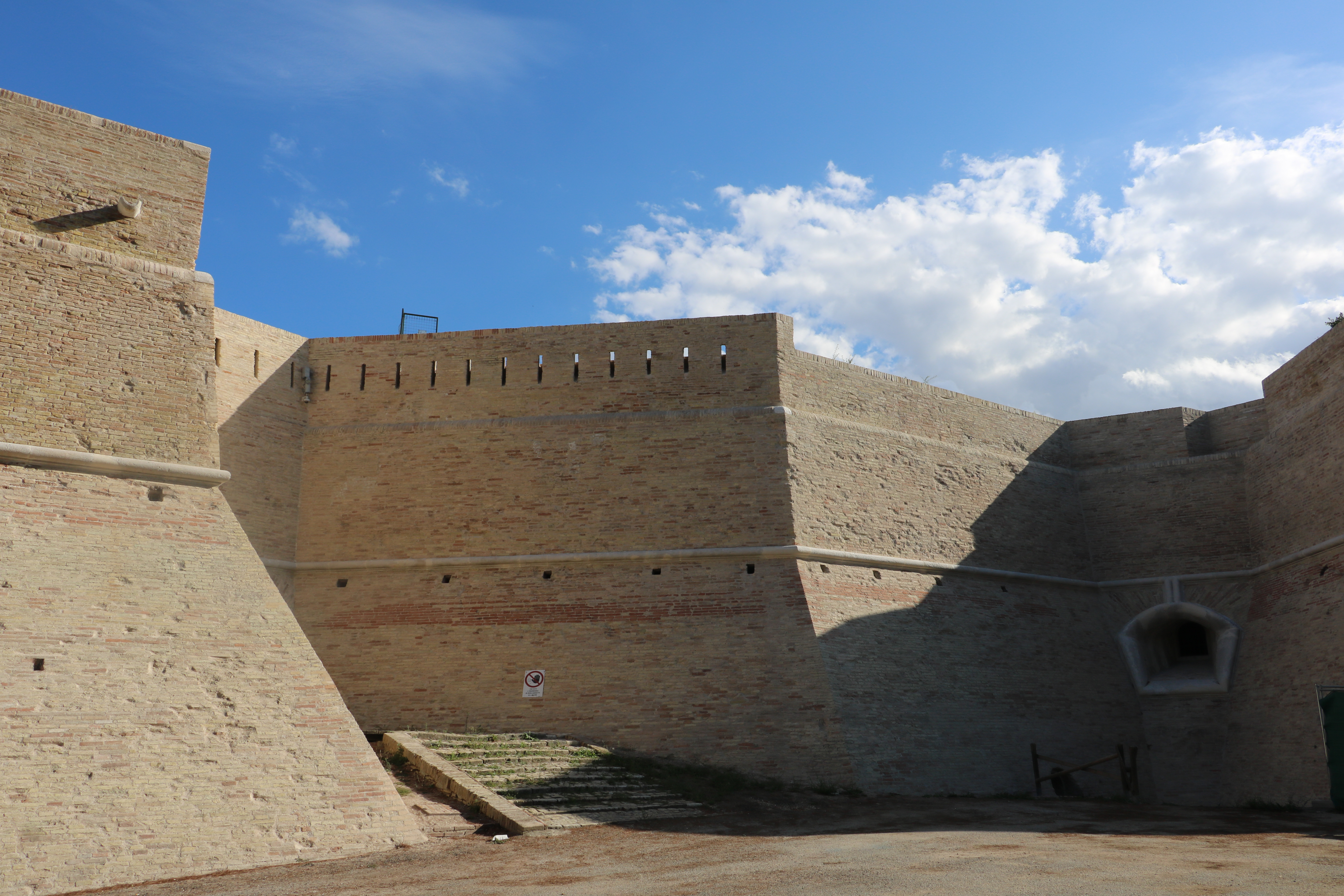
Ancona: Cittadella

== Military projects ==
Sangallo was also a noted military architect, working on the fortifications of numerous cities such as Parma, Piacenza, Ancona and Orvieto. [previous sentence not changed but added citation] One of the most significant projects for Antonio’s career was to design and build the Fortezza da Basso in 1534. Sangallo the Younger almost completed the project in two years for the new Imperial Duke of Florence, Alessandro de' Medici. Military construction was a different type of architecture that required strong fortifications and a vast labor force to excavate ditches and transport the materials. The fortifications that Sangallo designed were built to resist the cannonballs and explosive mines that could negatively impact the structural integrity of the building. Antonio gained the skills of designing and coordinating the logistics of hundreds of skilled and unskilled workers to build the complex network of spaces inside the military fortresses.

== Work on the Vatican and Saint Peter's Basilica ==
Sangallo had maintained a good relationship with the popes, and thus was involved in the designing and building process of St. Peter's Basilica until at least 1536. Previously, the Basilica was entrusted to Antonio's uncle, Giuliano da Sangallo. It was after the sack of Rome that Antonio da Sangallo was responsible for its undertaking, with construction of the Basilica beginning in April 1506. As "capomaestro", Sangallo was in charge of the day-to-day construction of the basilica for many years. Antonio collaborated with Donato Bramante, Raphael Sanzio, and Baldassarre Peruzzi to design the Basilica. He also created a design for the basilica, of which a wooden model exists today. After Antonio died in 1546, Michelangelo became the chief architect.

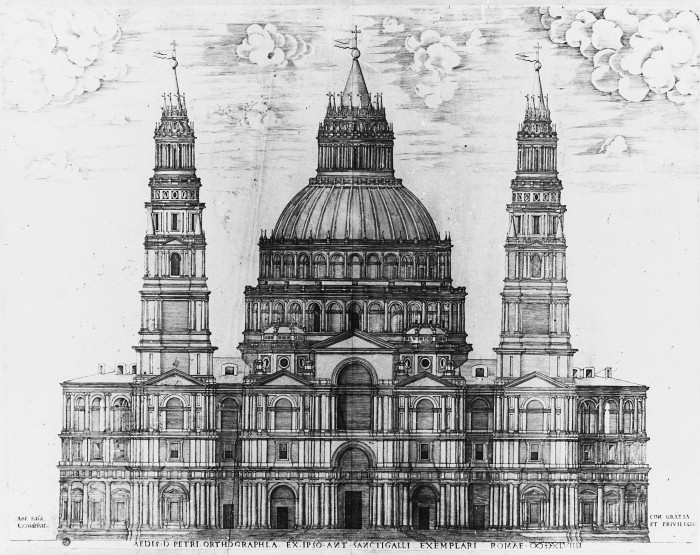
Facade of Sangallo's design for the basilica.

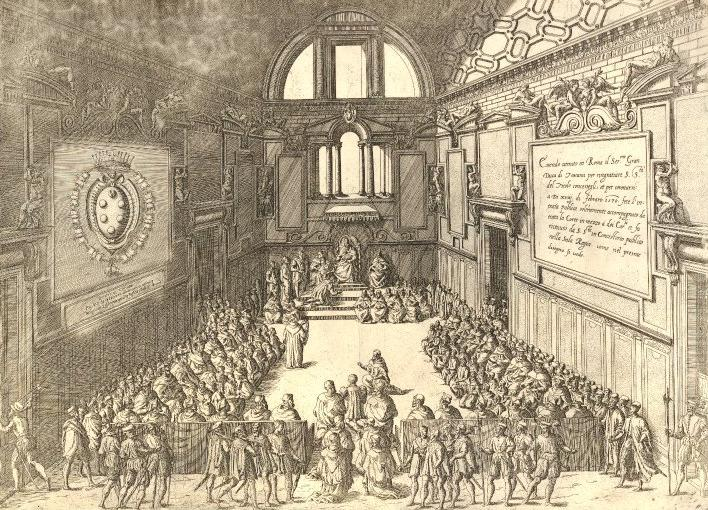
The Sala Regia, designed by Sangallo for Pope Paul III

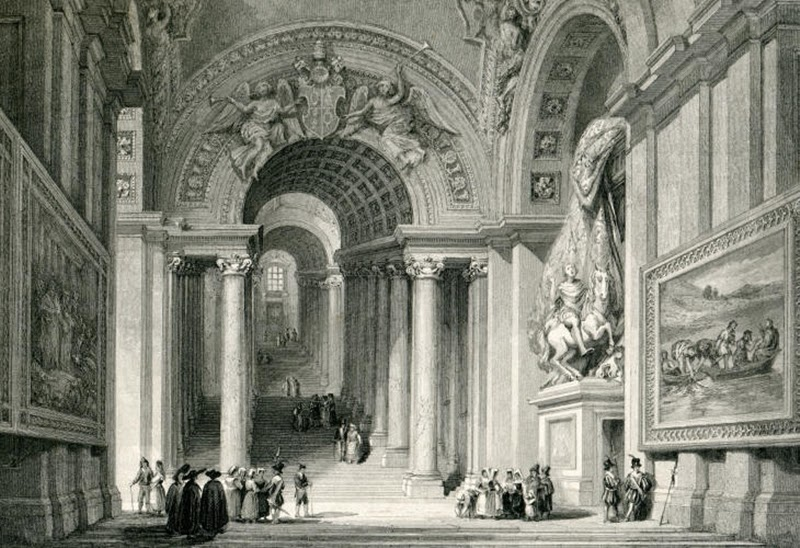
The Scala Regia, with sculptures by Bernini.

Sangallo also worked extensively on the Vatican apartments, building the Pauline Chapel, the Sala Regia which serves as the entryway to the Sistine Chapel. He also worked on the Scala Regia, the staircase that serves as the main entrance to the Apostolic Palace. Vasari also claims that Sangallo modified the Sistine Chapel by elevating the roof, although exactly what the modifications are is unclear.

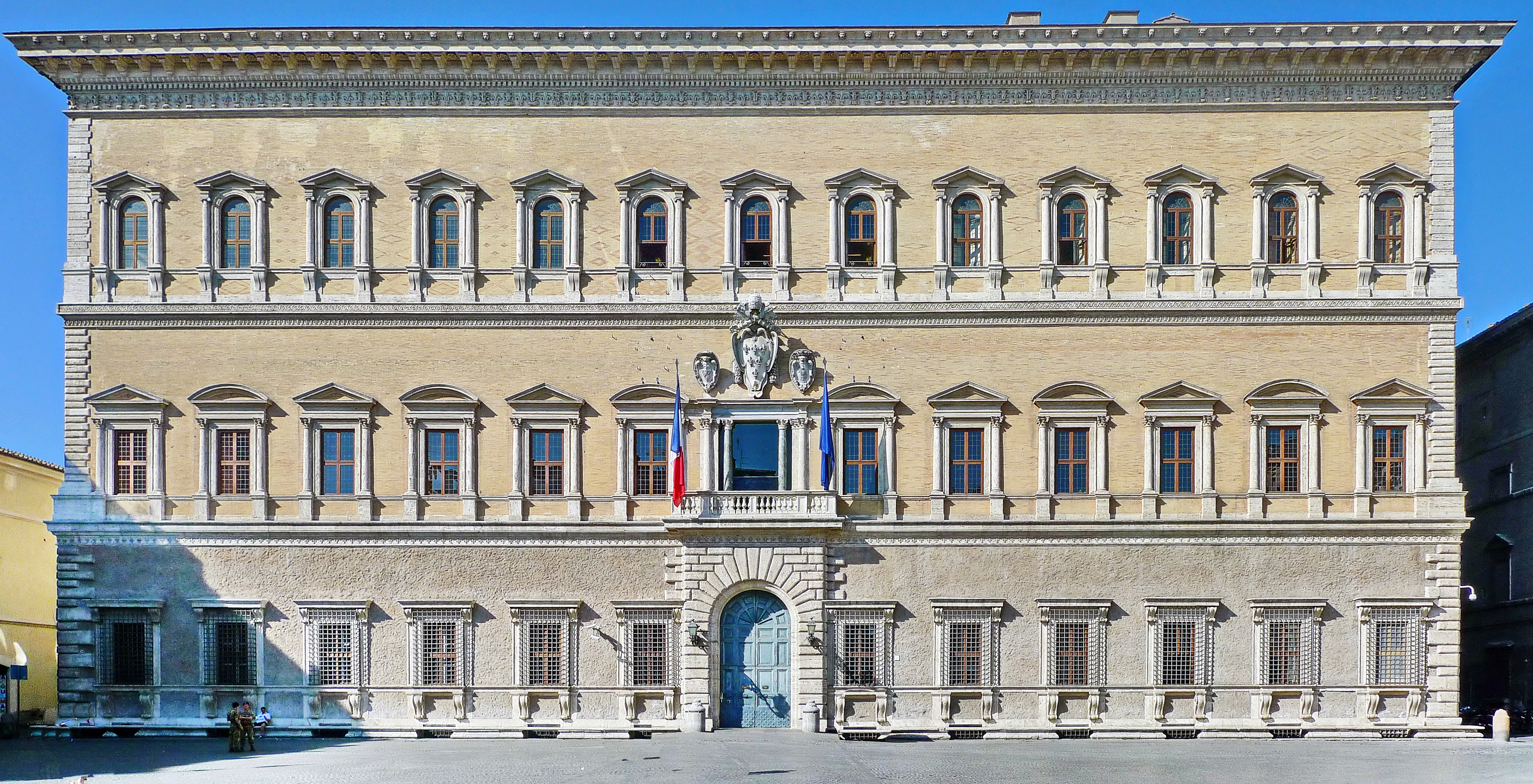
Palazzo Farnese in Rome

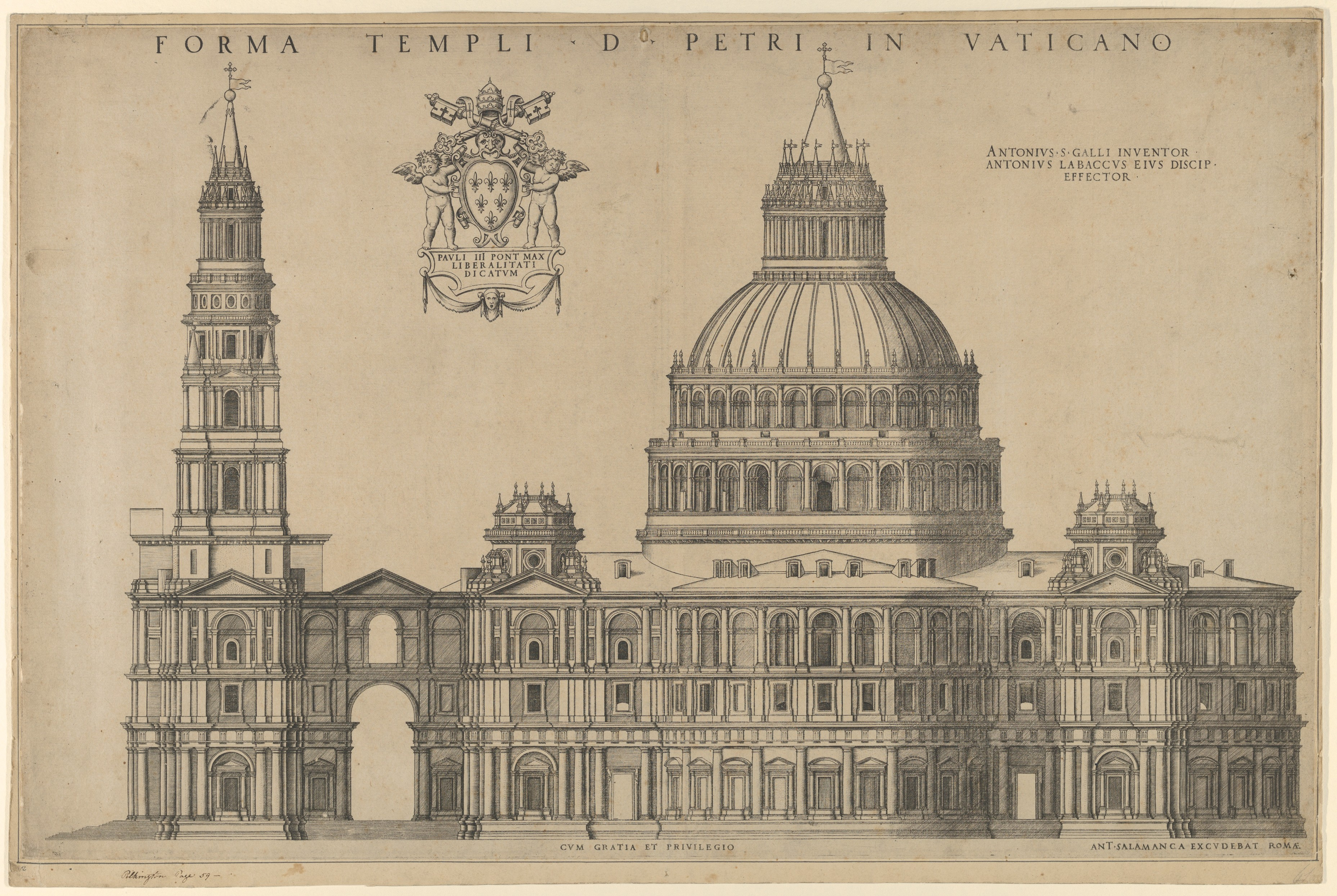
Drawing of St. Peter's Basilica

== Selected works ==
- Basilica della Santa Casa in Loreto.
- Cappella Paolina, the Sala Regia and the Scala Regia in the Vatican.
- Old Fortress, Livorno.
- Palazzo Baldassini in Rome.
- Palazzo del Governatore di Borgo in Rome, demolished in 1936.
- Palazzo Farnese in Rome (1534–46), designed for Cardinal Alessandro Farnese.
- Palazzo Sacchetti on the Via Giulia in Rome; designed by Sangallo for himself.
- Saint Patrick's Well in Orvieto.
- Santa Maria di Loreto in Rome.
- San Giovanni dei Fiorentini in Rome.
- St. Peter's Basilica in Rome (chief architect from 1520 on).
- Villa Madama in Rome (started 1518).
- Cappella Paolina, the Sala Regia and the Scala Regia in the Vatican.
- Palazzo Colonna (Marino)

== Death and legacy ==
Sangallo's final project was on the Rieti Valley, which had been commissioned to him by Pope Paul III. After working in the marshy environment, Sangallo contracted malaria and died in 1546 before finishing his work. Sangallo is buried in St. Peter's Basilica with the following epitaph:

ANTONIO SANCTI GALLI FLORENTINO, URBE MUNIENDA AC PUB.
OPERIBUS, PRAECIPUEQUE D. PETRI TEMPLO ORNAN. ARCHITECTORUM
FACILE PRINCIPI, DUM VELINI LACUS EMISSIONEM PARAT, PAULO PONT.
MAX. AUCTORE, INTERAMNAE INTEMPESTIVE EXTINCTO ISABELLA DETA
UXOR MOESTISS. POSUIT 1546, III. CALEND. OCTOBRIS.

His biographer Vasari writes, ″In truth Antonio, who was a most excellent architect, deserves to be celebrated and extolled, as his works clearly demonstrate, no less than any other architect, whether ancient or modern.″ As an architect, his legacy can be seen through the buildings he worked on, especially as they inspired future architectural methods. His existing drawings serve as insight for other architects who can hope to learn from his architectural forms.
