= Scala Regia =

Scala Regia (Latin pronunciation: [ˈskaːla ˈreːɡɪ.a]; English: "Royal Staircase") is a term referring to a number of majestic entrance staircases in Italian palaces plus some European palaces, including:

- The Scala Regia of the Vatican, a flight of steps designed by Gian Lorenzo Bernini (1663–1666) to connect the Vatican Palace to St. Peter's Basilica.
- Main staircase of Villa Farnese at Caprarola
- Entrance to the Ducal Palace of Lucca
- Entrance to House of Lords, Westminster, United Kingdom

Other staircase entrances include the Scala d'Oro in Venice.
