= Pozzo di San Patrizio =

Historic well in Orvieto, Umbria, central Italy

Coordinates: 42.722°N 12.121°E

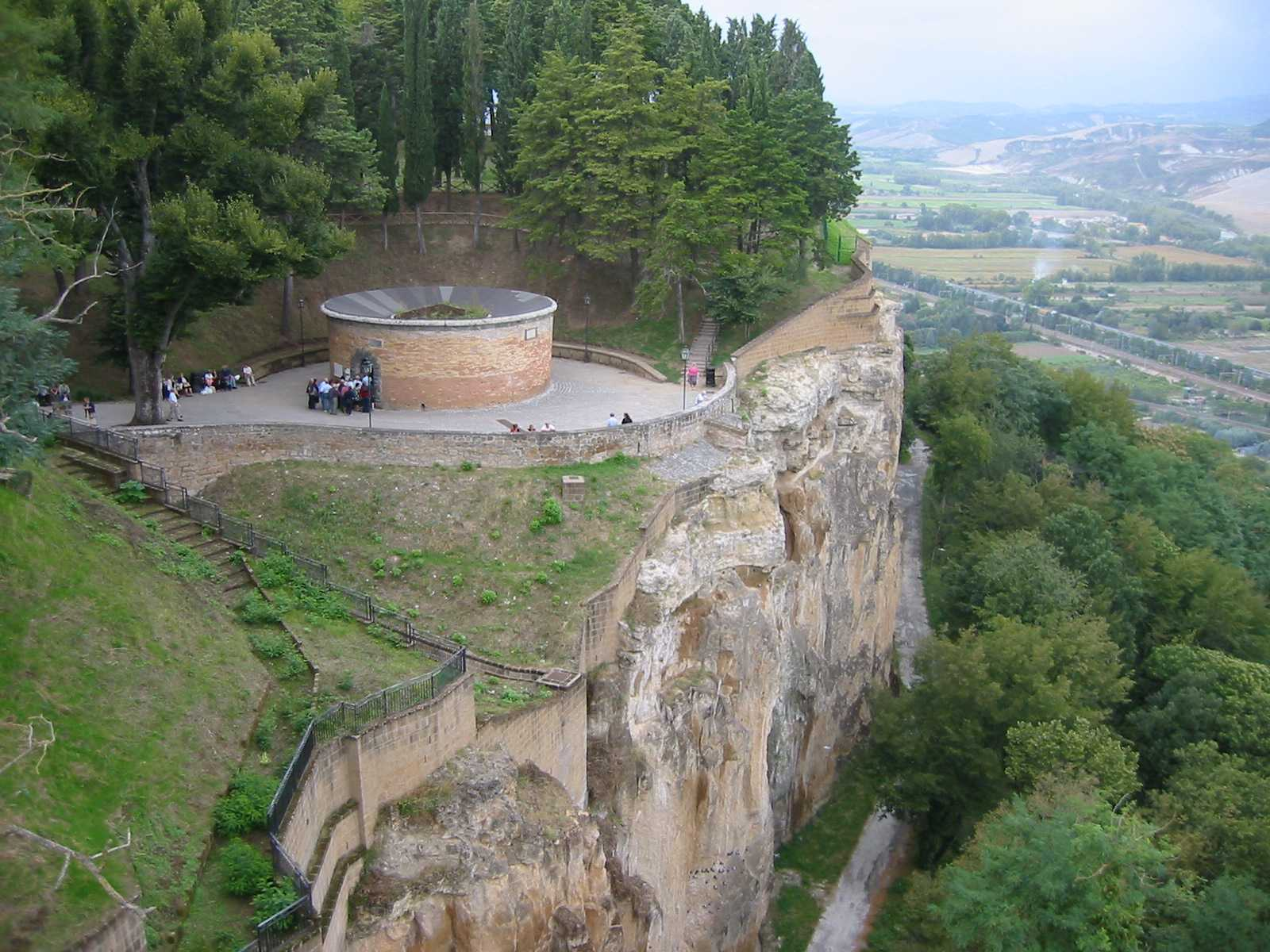
Pozzo di San Patrizio at Orvieto

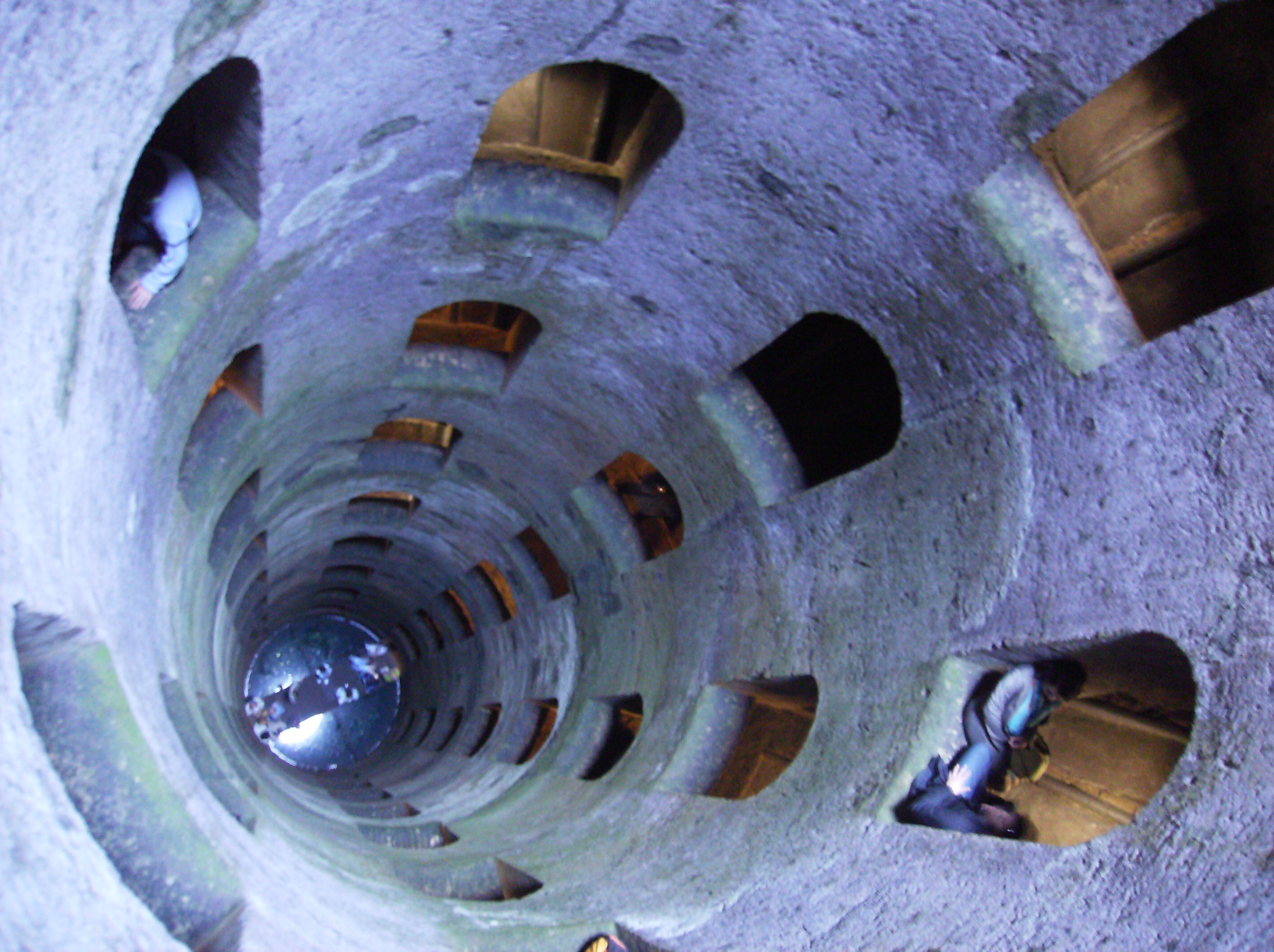
The Pozzo di San Patrizio, a well built at Orvieto commissioned by Pope Clement VII

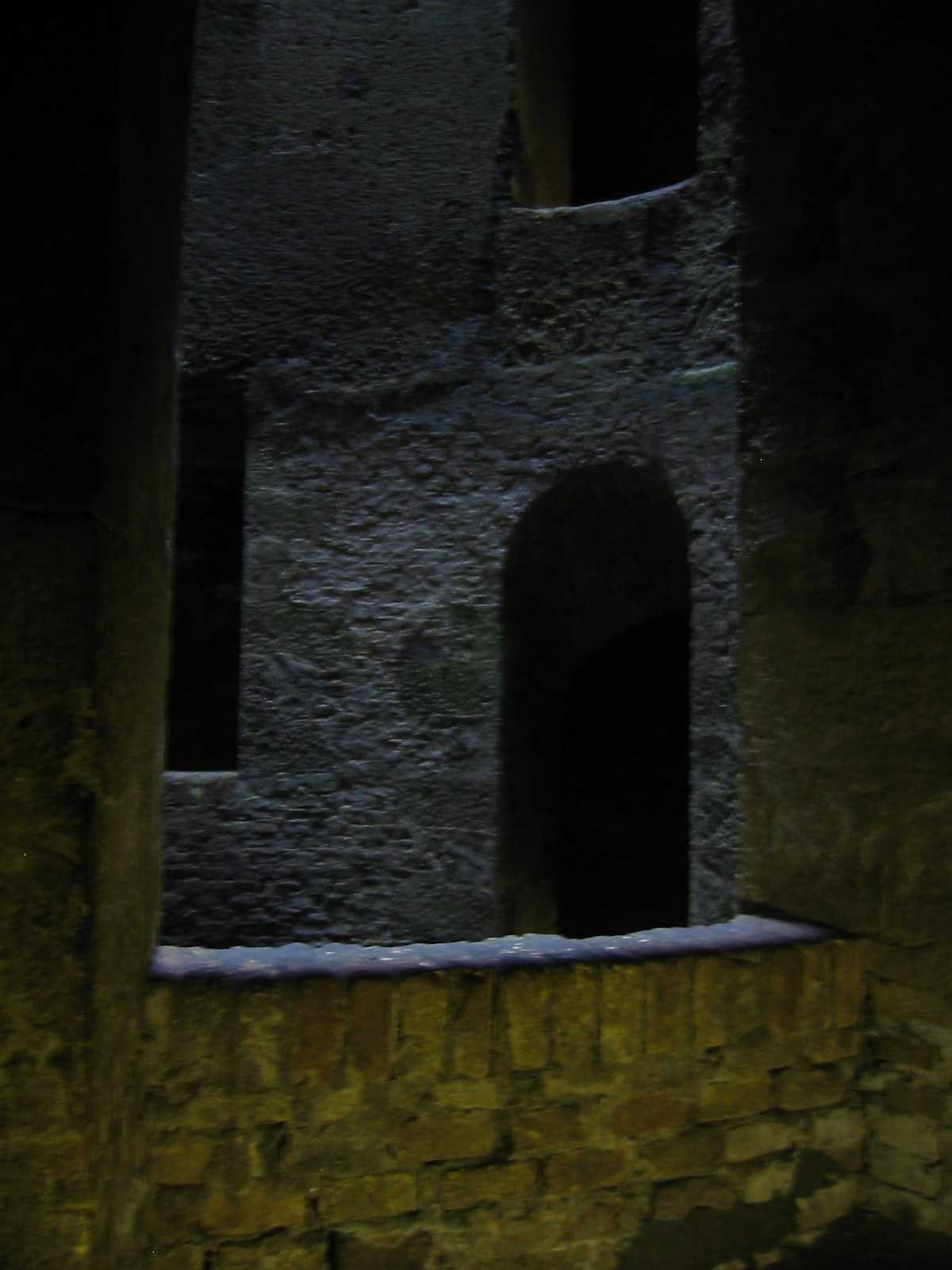
Interior view, showing staggered windows along the double helix staircases

The Pozzo di San Patrizio (English: "Well of St. Patrick") is a historic well in Orvieto, Umbria, central Italy. The city is high on the flat summit of a large butte of volcanic tuff that was fortified with defensive walls. The well was built between 1527 and 1537 by the architect-engineer Antonio da Sangallo the Younger of Florence, at the behest of Pope Clement VII who had taken refuge at Orvieto during the sack of Rome in 1527 by the Holy Roman Emperor Charles V. The city proved to be an excellent refuge except that Clement feared that the natural water supply for Orvieto would be insufficient in the event of a protracted siege. The well was completed in 1537 during the papacy of Pope Paul III.

The name was inspired by medieval legends that St. Patrick's Purgatory in Ireland gave access down to Purgatory, indicating something very deep.

The architect-engineer Antonio da Sangallo the Younger surrounded the central well shaft with two helical ramps in a double helix, accessed by two separate doors that allowed teams of donkeys to carry empty water vessels downward and full water vessels upward without having to cross paths by using the same staircase, and creating a continuous flow of their progress. The cylindrical well is 53.15 metres (174.4 ft) deep with a base diameter of 13 metres (43 ft). There are 248 steps and 70 windows provide illumination.

A Latin inscription on the well states QUOD NATURA MUNIMENTO INVIDERAT INDUSTRIA ADIECIT 'what nature has begrudged, industry has supplied'.
