= Museo Claudio Faina =

Claudio Faina Museum
- Museo Claudio Faina
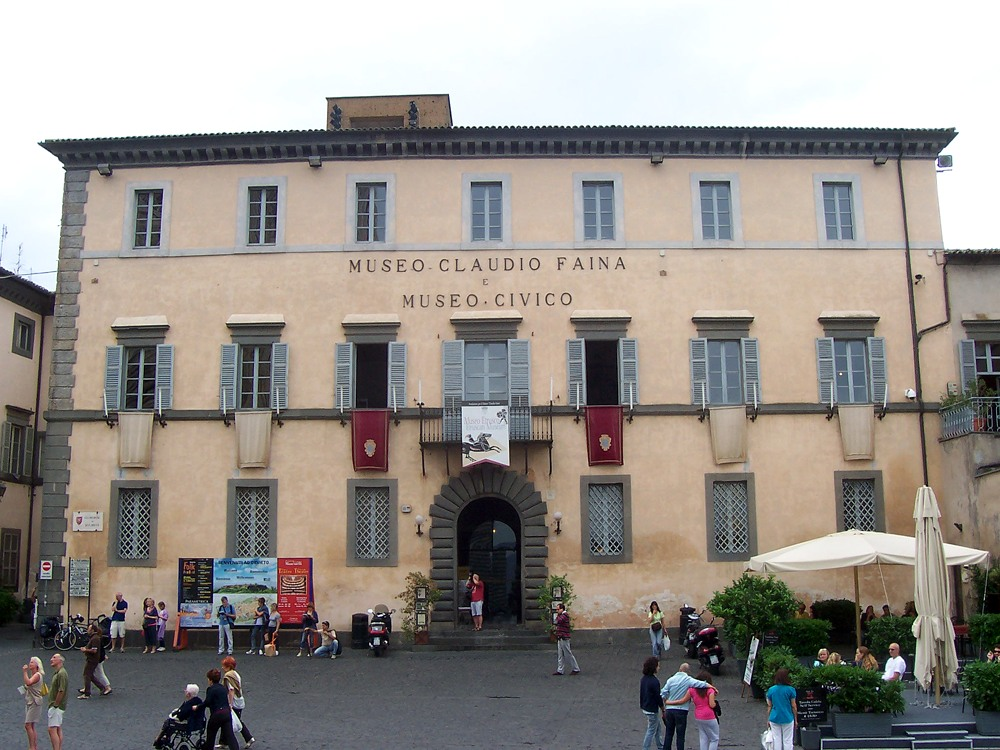
- Facade of the museum
- Former name: Palazzo Faina
- Location: Orvieto, Italy
- Coordinates: 42°43′01″N 12°06′45″E
- Type: Archeologic museum
- Collections: Etruscan and Greek artifacts
- Founder: Claudio Faina
- Website: https://museofaina.it

The Museo Claudio Faina is an archeologic museum located in the Palazzo Faina, across the piazza from the north side of the facade of the Duomo in Orvieto, region of Umbria, Italy.

== Description ==
The archeologic museum is housed in the Palazzo Faina, attached near the crossing to the South of the Cathedral building. This museum and the nearby, but distinct National Archaeological Museum of Orvieto, located in Gothic-style 13th-century Papal Palace (the section called Palazzo Martino IV) in Piazza Duomo, also displays findings from and around Orvieto. The southern flank of the palace constitutes Via Lorenzo Maitani, and the Palazzo Netti is a few houses west on this alley.

The museum owes its existence to the acquisitions initially started by Count Mauro Faina, starting in 1864 until his death in 1868. One oral tradition holds that the original start was due to the donation by Princess Maria Bonaparte (daughter of Lucien) of 34 ancient vases to the Mauro (uncle of Eugenio). These vases had been discovered in the necropolis of Vulci. The count then expanded the collection mainly by purchasing more works in the antiquity markets. Mauro was involved in acquiring a numismatic collection of three thousand ancient coins. Eugenio rather than purchasing works through merchants of antiquities, favored acquiring works from local excavations in Orvieto. He appears to have acquired finds from the necropolis of Crocifisso del Tufo. The museum also has votive bronze statues, prehistoric finds, Etruscan vases and painted ancient Greek vases.

Initially, the collections had been housed in the family's palace in Perugia. In 1855–1856, the count had purchased a medieval palace at the site, belonging to the Monaldeschi family, which had undergone a number of refurbishment. The Faina family set to have the halls and rooms of the piano nobile frescoed by Annibale Angelini, who painted them from 1865 to 1866. The collections were privately held until 1950s in this palace by Claudio Faina. During the decades before, the guidebooks to Orvieto mention that the collection was viewable after an application or request to the count, and likely a fee.

On the ground floor of the museum have been added more recent findings, part of the collections of the Civic Museum, including from the nearby Etruscan sanctuary of Cannicella and temple of Belvedere. Among these collections are the Venus of Cannicella and a warrior's headstone.

== Gallery ==
Pieces from Collection

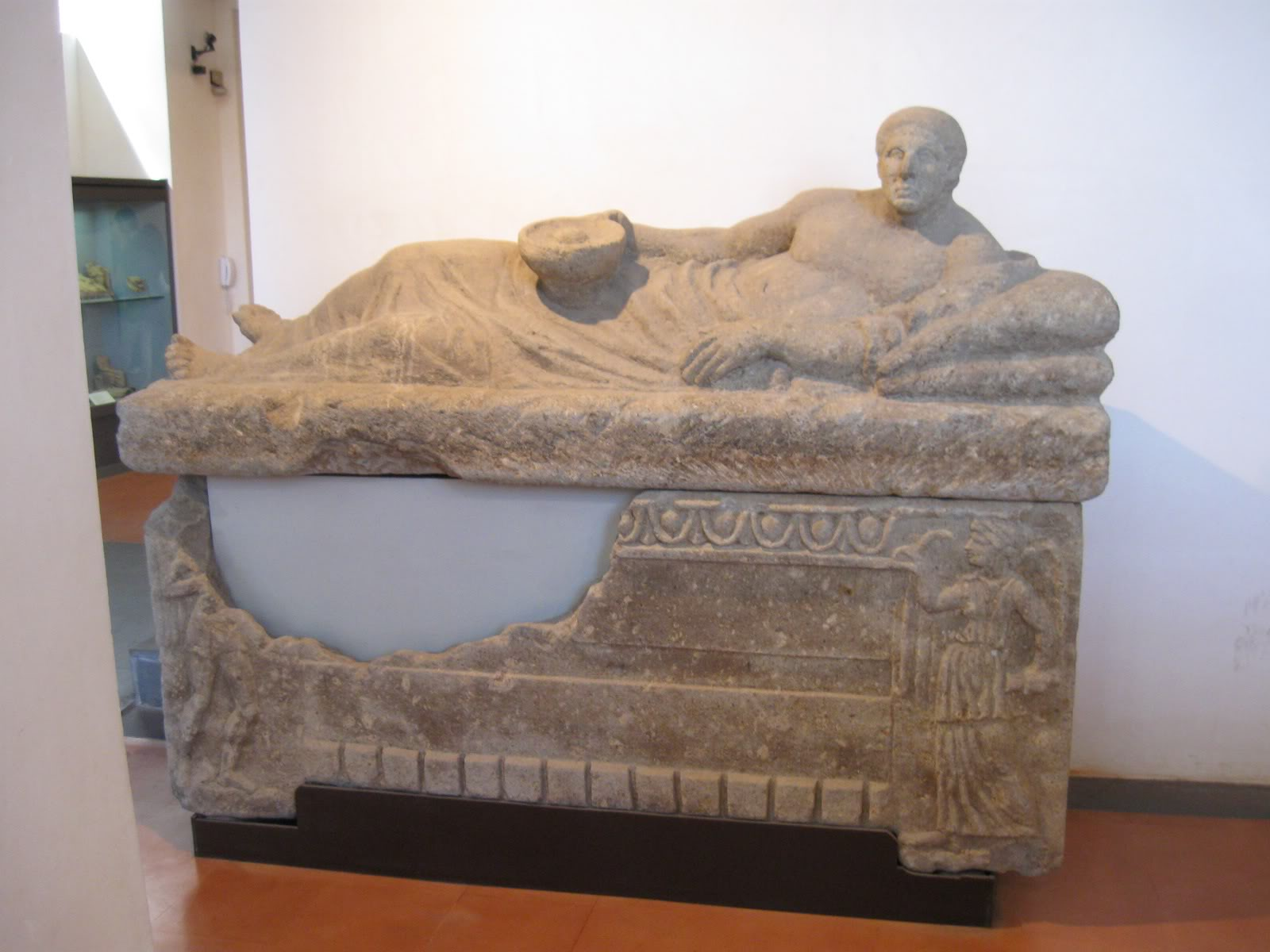
Etruscan tomb sarcophagus

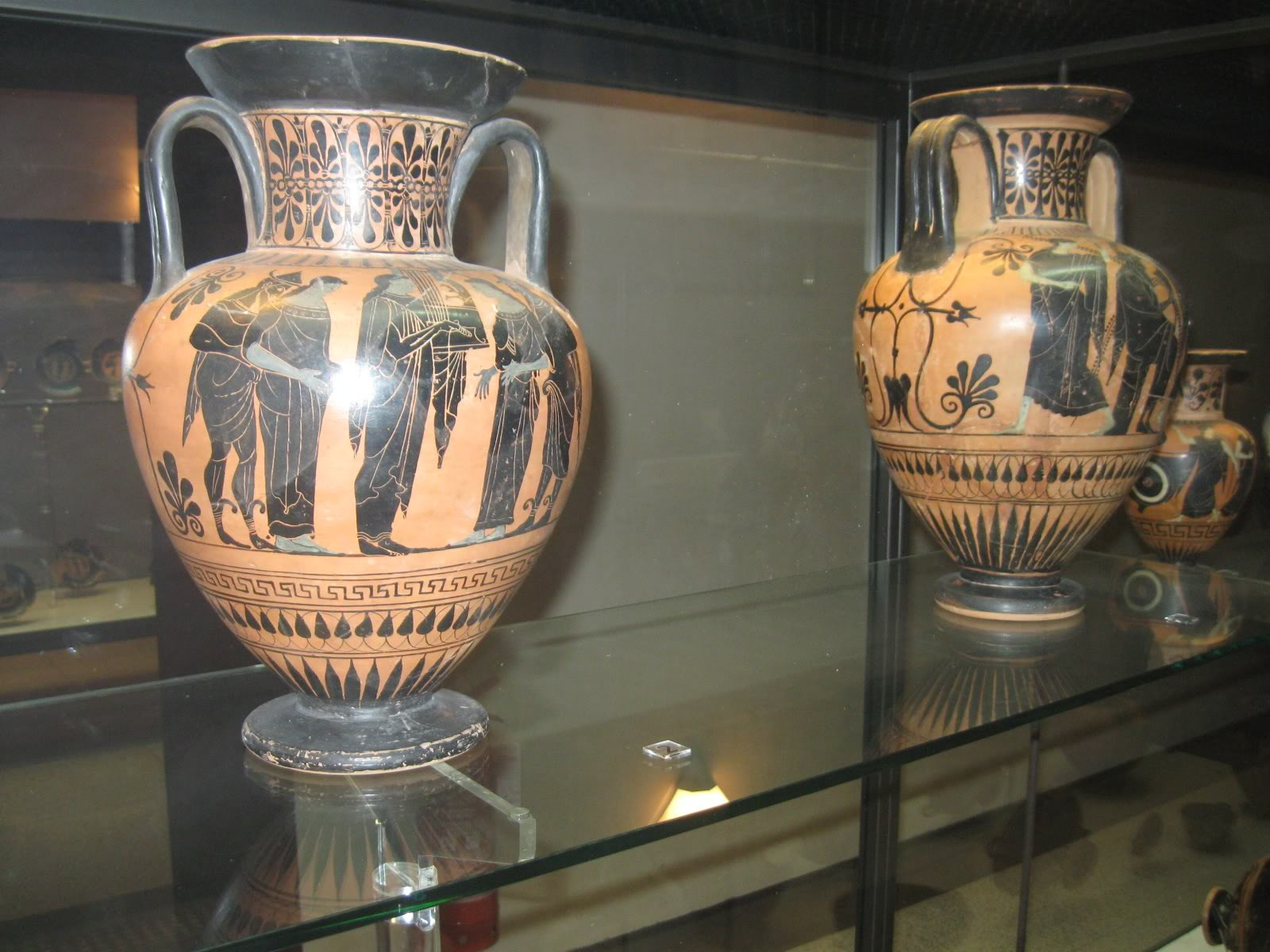
Greek Black figure Amphora

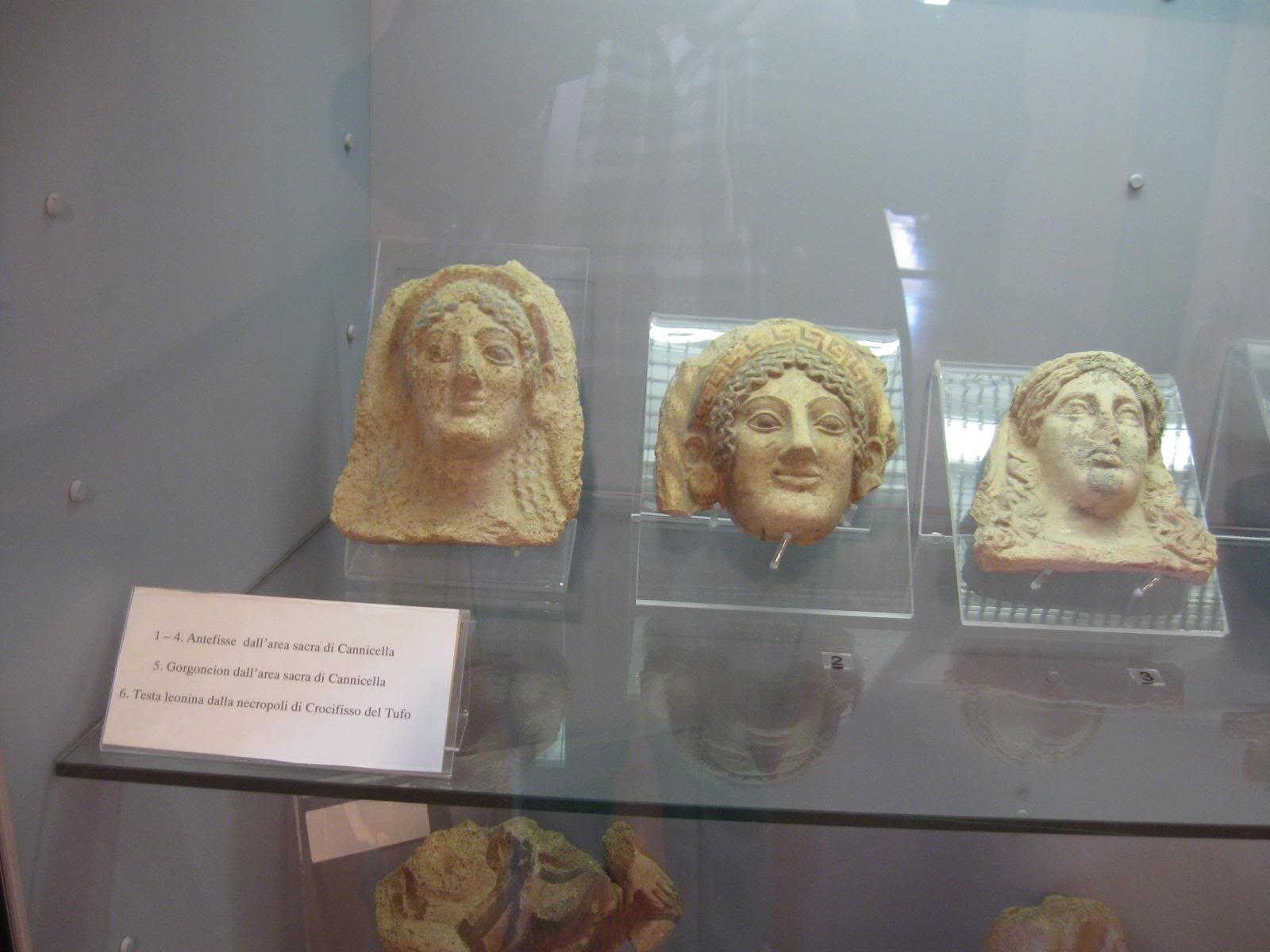
From the excavations at Canicella

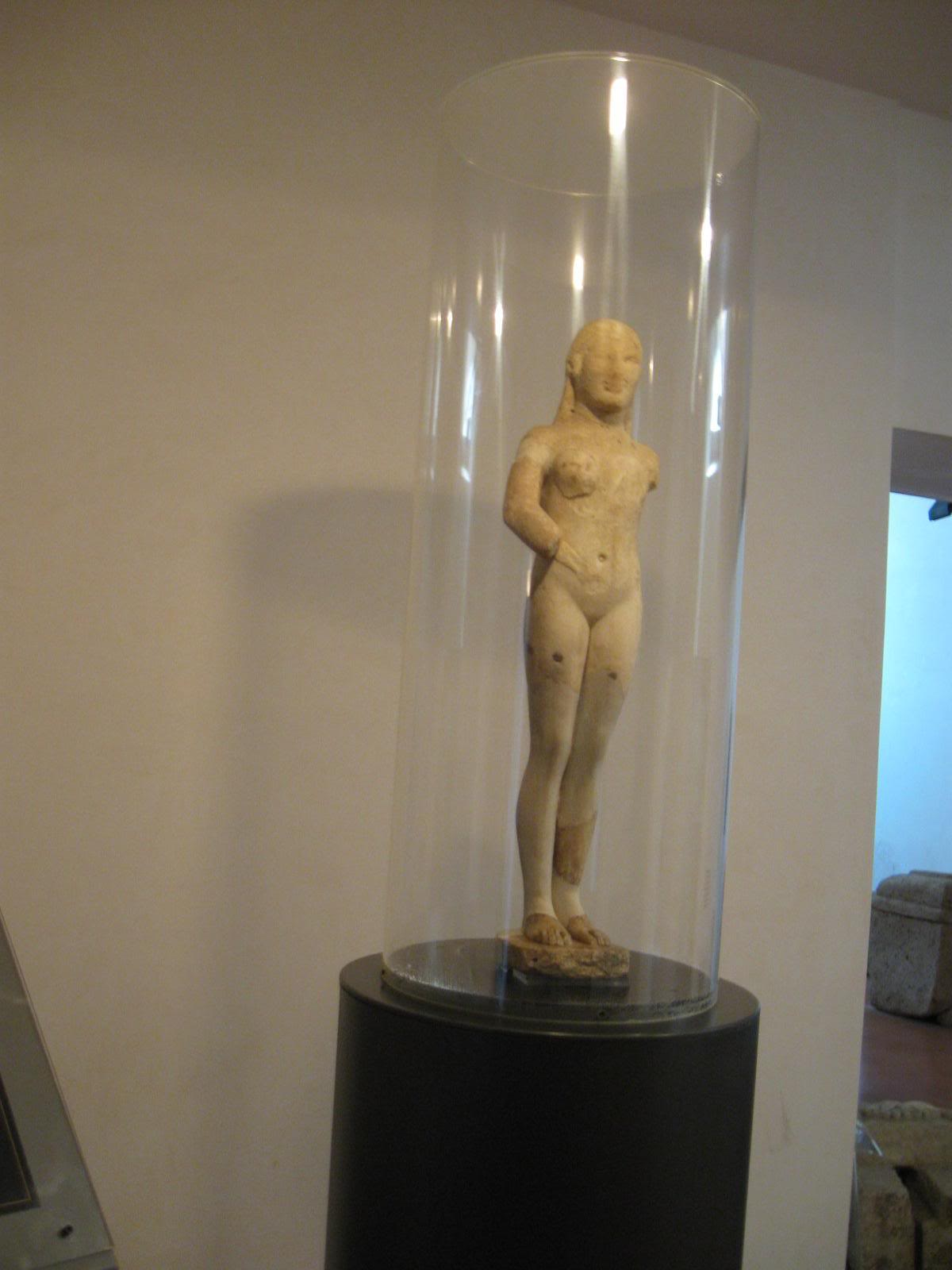
Venere di Cannicella (Venus of Cannicella)

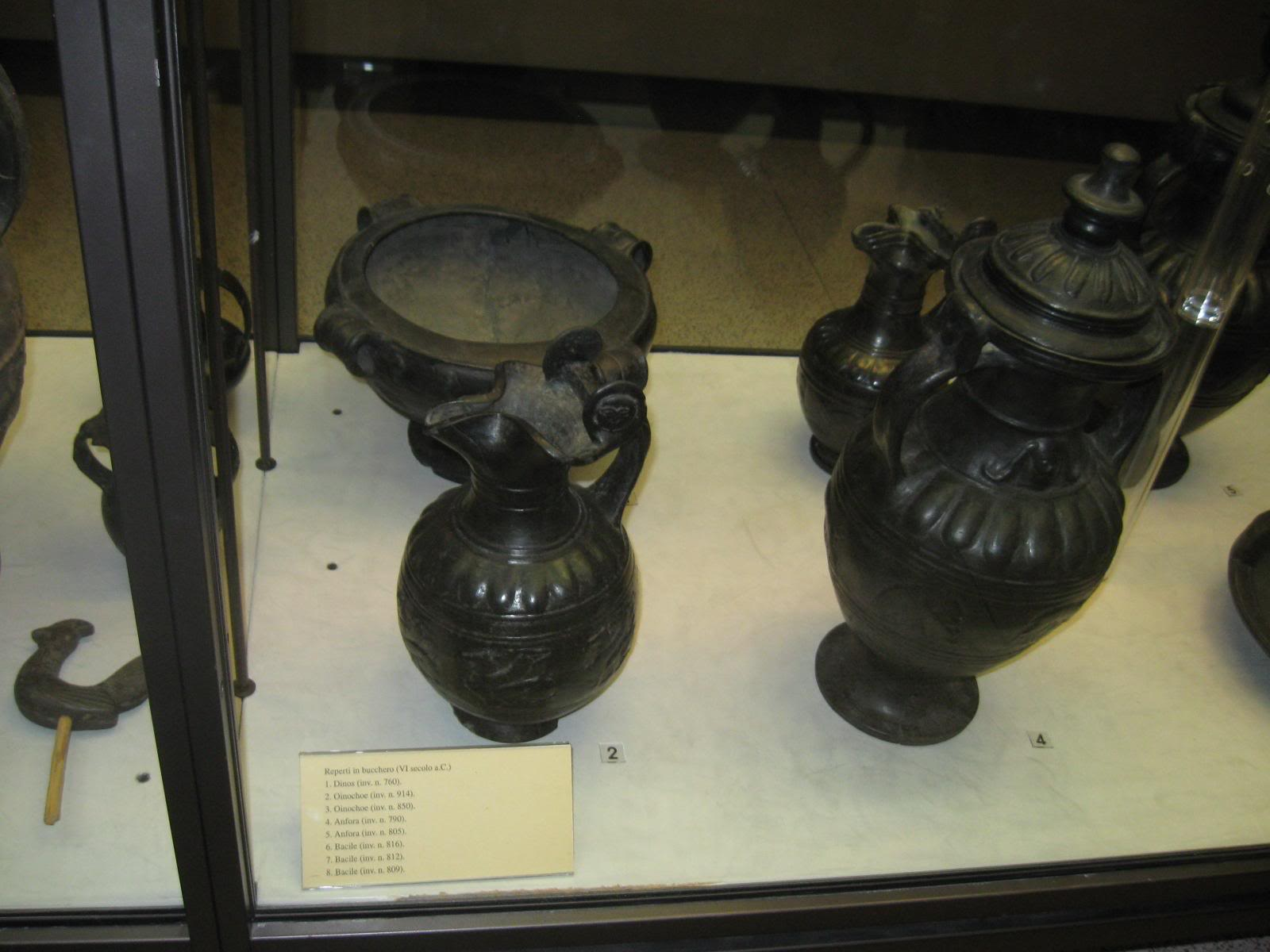
Buchero ceramics
