= Golini tombs =

Archeological feature in Italy

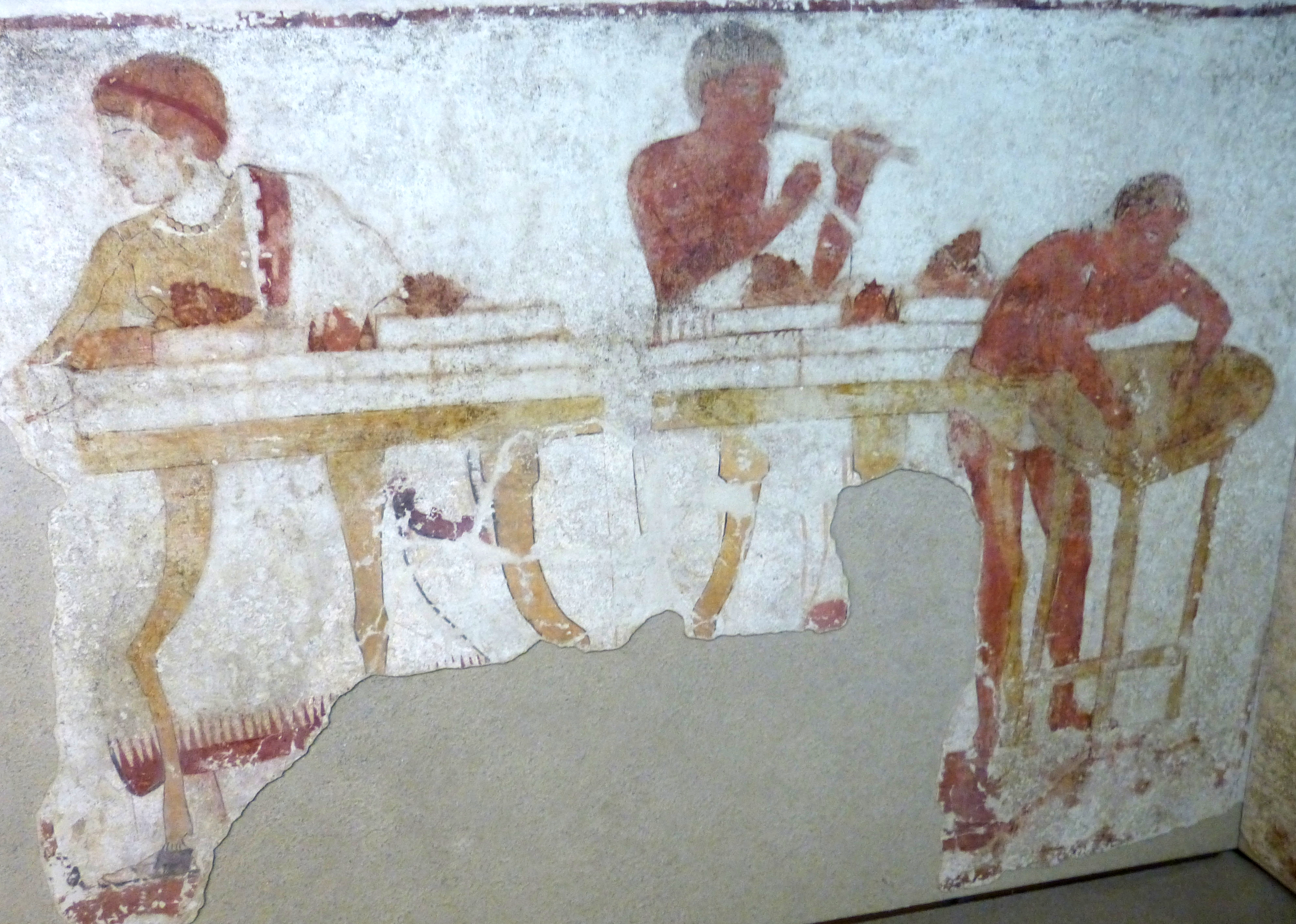
Fresco from Golini Tomb I in Museo Nazionale di Orvieto

The Golini Tombs are two 4th-century BC, Etruscan tombs discovered close to the hamlet of Porano (also described as Poggio Roccolo near Settecamini), near Orvieto, Italy. The adjacent tombs were discovered in 1863 by Domenico Golini (from whom the name of the tombs derives). Originally the tombs were called "Tomb of the two chariots" (the so-called Golini I tomb) and "Tomba dei Velii" (Golini II).

== Description ==
The two tombs are frescoed with scenes accompanied by inscriptions in the Etruscan language which probably represent the deceased and his arrival in the underworld and his welcome into the afterlife with a banquet prepared in his honor. The original frescoes are preserved in the archaeological museum in Orvieto, and visible in an installation that faithfully reproduces the structure of the funerary chambers.

Danish archeologist Frederik Poulsen described the site in 1922:

In the tomba Golini ... to judge from its style, contemporary with the Tomba degli Scudi and the front chamber of the Tomba dell’Orco, we see in the symposium on the back wall two men on the same couch drinking to the accompaniment of the two familiar musicians. Beneath the couch we can make out dimly a servant, and a hunting leopard, probably feeding; both have their names attached: that of the animal is Kankru...

Of the two men reclining on the couch the foremost holds a drinking-bowl... It is an elderly man; his face is one of the earliest examples of naturalism in Etruscan portraiture. The other, full-bearded, holds a flat, fluted vessel without foot, presumably one of the celebrated Etruscan golden vessels that are more minutely characterized in a symposium in the Tomba della Pulcella; they were even introduced into Athens, where, side by side with Corinthian works in bronze, they formed part of the decoration of a wealthy house. They are eulogized in a poem by Critias, one of Athens' finest beaux esprits.

In this painting in the Tomba Golini the inscriptions give us much valuable information as to the connexion between the two persons. Above the first [man] we read:

‘vel lecates, arnthial ruva, larthialisa clan, velusum nefs. marniu spurana eprthne-c tenve, mechl-um rasneas cleusinsl zilachnve, pul-um rumitrine thi ma[l]ce, clel lu[pu-ce].

One suggested translation of the text runs:

'Vel Lecates, Amth's brother, son of Larth, and descendant of Vel. He held the offices of Maro urbanus (spur means town) and Eprthne (secular official title), and was Zilach (dictator) of the Etruscan people in Clusium..."

The rest is unintelligible. It is interesting in the inscription to come across the name by which the Etruscans called themselves, rasneas; Dionysius of Halicarnassus (i. 30) was therefore justified in saying that the Etruscans called themselves Rasenas. The name Larth is common in Etruscan inscriptions. The Romans knew it and called the well-known Etruscan king by his full name, Lars Porsenna (in Etruscan, Larth Pursna).

In the same tomb, to the left of this scene, we see a table, bearing several metal vessels, a thymiaterion, and an ivory box for incense, and flanked by two candelabra with lighted candles stuck into birds’ beaks, the Etruscans were considered inventors of the art of candle-making and taught the Romans to manufacture different kinds of candles, from big wax candles—candelae and cerei—to cheap dips—sebaceae. The Italic peoples used candles and candlesticks until Roman imperial times, though in the last centuries they also had oil lamps, the manufacture, and use of which they had learned from the Greeks; the oldest clay lamps found in the northern part of Italy date from about 300 b.c. to the left of the table is seen a naked slave with a jug and a dish; to the right a young man in a light-colored, sleeved chiton, who has been conjectured to be another servant. But again the inscription affords positive information:

‘vel leinies larthial ruva arnthialum clan velusum prumaths avils semphs lupuce’
i.e. 'Vel Leinies, Larth's brother, son of Amth and descendant of Vel ; he died (lupuce) at the age of 7.'

So the boy is a son of the hindmost man on the banqueting couch and belongs to the noble family interred in the tomb.

...[Also] we find in the Tomba Golini pictures the preparations for the banquet celebrated in the pictures mentioned above. In one of the pictures we see cattle, venison, and poultry hanging in the larder as in a butcher's shop, in another the cooking in the kitchen itself, like everything else in Etruria, it is accompanied by the flute. To the left of the flute player a woman is struggling with a sideboard piled with food; to the right a naked slave with a loin-cloth is working at a small table, using two small implements rather like plummets. Various interpretations have been advanced: that he is kneading dough, or grinding colours... The table itself, at which the slave is standing, seems to have a raised edge...

In these scenes from kitchen and wine cellar, where the meat is being chopped by the butcher, where the cooks are swinging the saucepans or working at the range, where young slaves are struggling with sideboards covered with drinking-vessels, the inscriptions contain the names of slaves.

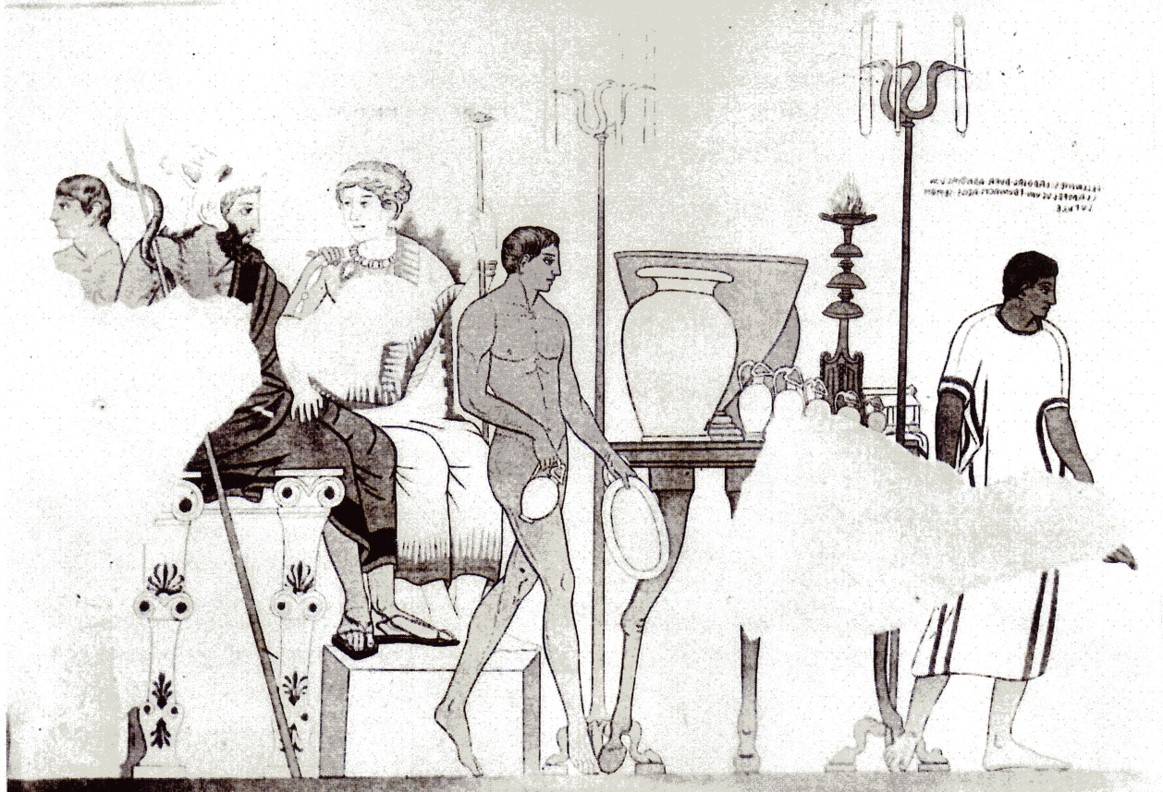
A drawing depicting one of the frescoes from the Golini tombs at Orvieto

...[Also] in the Tomba Golini, we see the side-table and the slave in the immediate continuation of the picture representing the two enthroned rulers of the Underworld, Hades and Persephone (inscriptions: Eita and Ph ers ipnai). Hades has a wolf helmet and a snake sceptre and is caressing Persephone, who has a bird-crowned sceptre in her left hand, and rests her right hand on the knee of Hades. Her dress, face, and yellow hair under the golden diadem are all splendidly painted.

== Notes on translations of inscriptions ==
In the first passage, the French scholar Jacques Heurgon takes the second word, lecates, to be equivalent to Latin legatus in the sense of "ambassador (to Rome)." Toward the end of the same passage, he analyses rumi-tri-n-e as "to (-e) those people (-tri-n-) (living along the) Tiber," noting that rumon was an ancient Etruscan term for that river, though it could theoretically also apply to Rome itself. The former is more likely, since thi means "water." So the sentence pul-um rumitrine thi ma[l]ce might be read: "And he was given (mal-ce) (authority over) water (rights) among the people of the (upper?) Tiber" pul remaining untranslated—it is generally translated as 'star' in the bilingual Pyrgi Tablets, but it is not clear how that meaning would fit in this context.

== Bibliography ==
- Heurgon, J. (1974) "Un Legatus à Volsinii. À propos des inscriptions de la tombe Golini I" Mélanges de l'École française de Rome 86-2 pp. 707–721 https://www.persee.fr/doc/mefr_0223-5102_1974_num_86_2_986
- Della Fina, Giuseppe M. (2011) "La nuova Italia e i beni archeologici : il caso della scoperta delle tombe Golini I e II." in Annali della Fondazione per il Museo "Claudio Faina" XVIII. Orvieto: Quasar. 2011
- Pizzirani, C. (2015) "Verso una nuova lettura ermeneutica della tomba Golini I e della pittura funeraria orvietana" ("Towards a new hermeneutic reading of the Golini I tomb and of Orvieto funerary painting") Studi Etruschi
