= Palazzo Netti, Orvieto =

Coordinates: 42.71659°N 12.11208°E

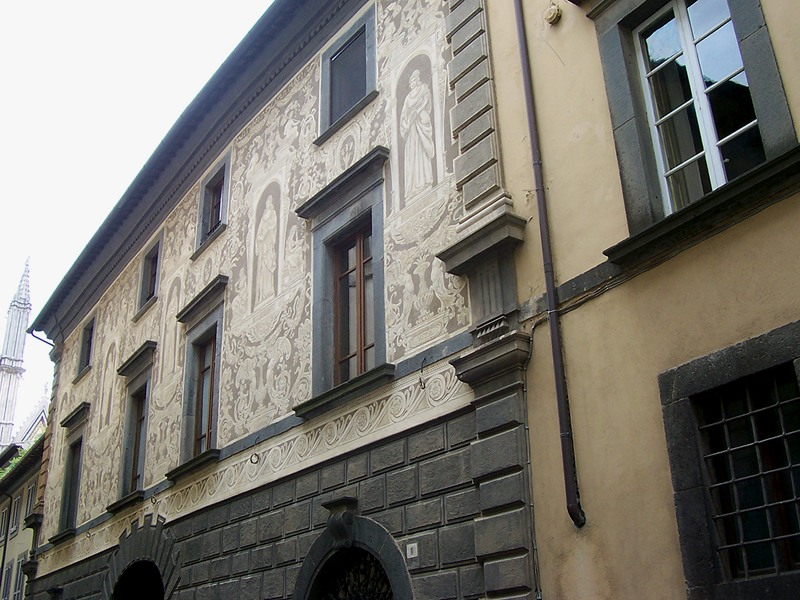
Portion of the decorated facade of Palazzo Netti

Palazzo Netti is a Neo-Renaissance architecture palace located on Via Lorenzo Maitani #9, the alley that leads west from the central portal of the Duomo of Orvieto in the region of Umbria, Italy. The palace originally belonged to the family of Vincenzo Durante, bishop of Orvieto from 1529 to 1541, then to the Vespi family. The present palace with its elaborate sgraffito facade was refurbished in the 19th-century by the Florentine professor Giuseppe Smerrini under commission by the engineer Aldobrando Netti. Netti became known for opening the first electrical hydropower plant in Orvieto, allowing for the town theater, Teatro Mancinelli, to be one of the first buildings in town with electricity. The Officine Netti was built in 1893, and are located north-west of Orvieto in the neighborhood of Sugano and Rocca Ripesena (circa 42.71751 and 12.06515); the ruins provide an immage of the luddite victory of nature over early industrialism.

Netti appears to have wanted to embody in his palace's facade an allegorical vision of the fruits of industrial progress, but using a vocabulary of classicism. The first floor of the palace is made with rusticated stones, pierced in the center by an alleway. The upper floors are densely decorated with the sgrafitto decoration: from left to right are depictions of an allegorical female above a vase or fountain. The first column has "air" above "fire"; the second "labor" above "study"; the third "science" above "knowledge"; the fourth "water" above "energy"; and the fifth, "earth" over "life".

The palace was briefly requisitioned by the German occupying army during 1944.
