= Mentawai macaque =

The Mentawai macaque or Mentawai island macaque may refer to:

- Pagai Island macaque, Macaca pagensis (on the islands of North Pagai, South Pagai and Sipora)
- Siberut macaque, Macaca siberu (on the island of Siberut)
