= Aparajita Datta =

Indian wildlife conservationist

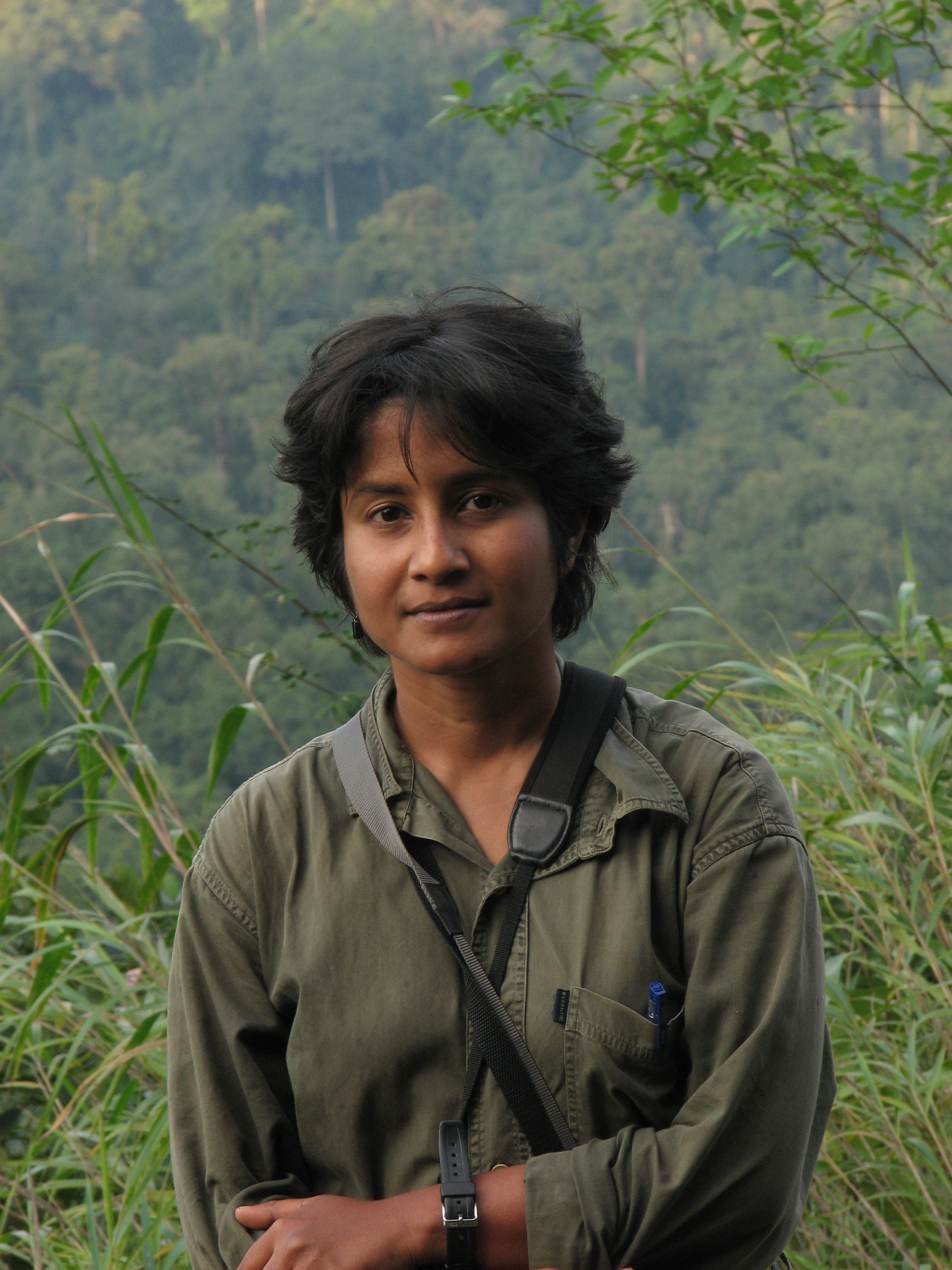
- Datta in 2006
- Born: 5 January 1970 (age 56); Kolkata, India
- Education: Wildlife Institute of India, Dehradun
- Known for: Hornbills
- Awards: Whitley Award
- Scientific career
- Fields: Wildlife Conservation, Conservation Biology, Ecology
- Workplaces: Nature Conservation Foundation

Aparajita Datta - Turning hunters into conservationists: Video presentation, 7 minutes

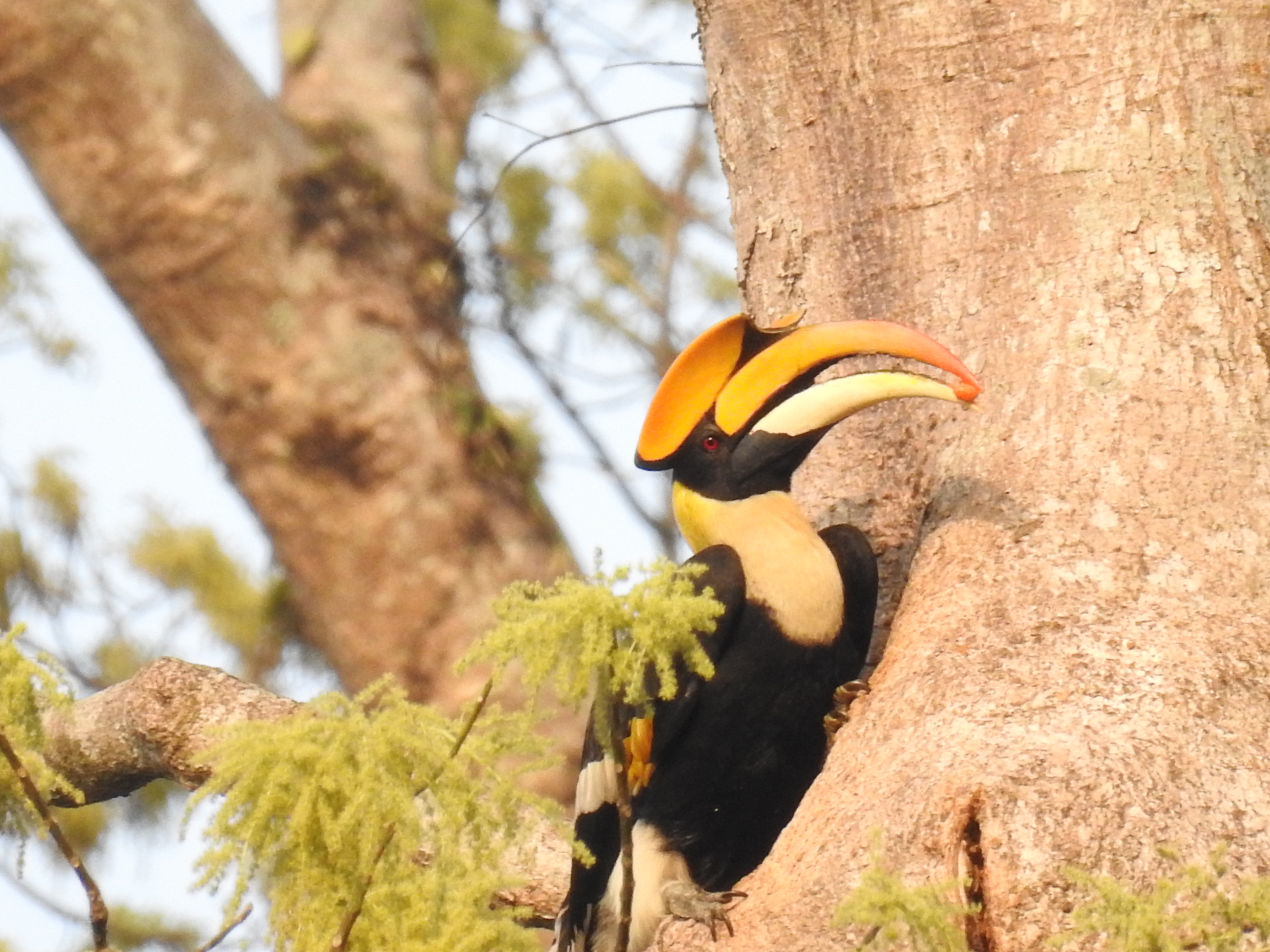
The Great Hornbill, photographed by Datta in 2015

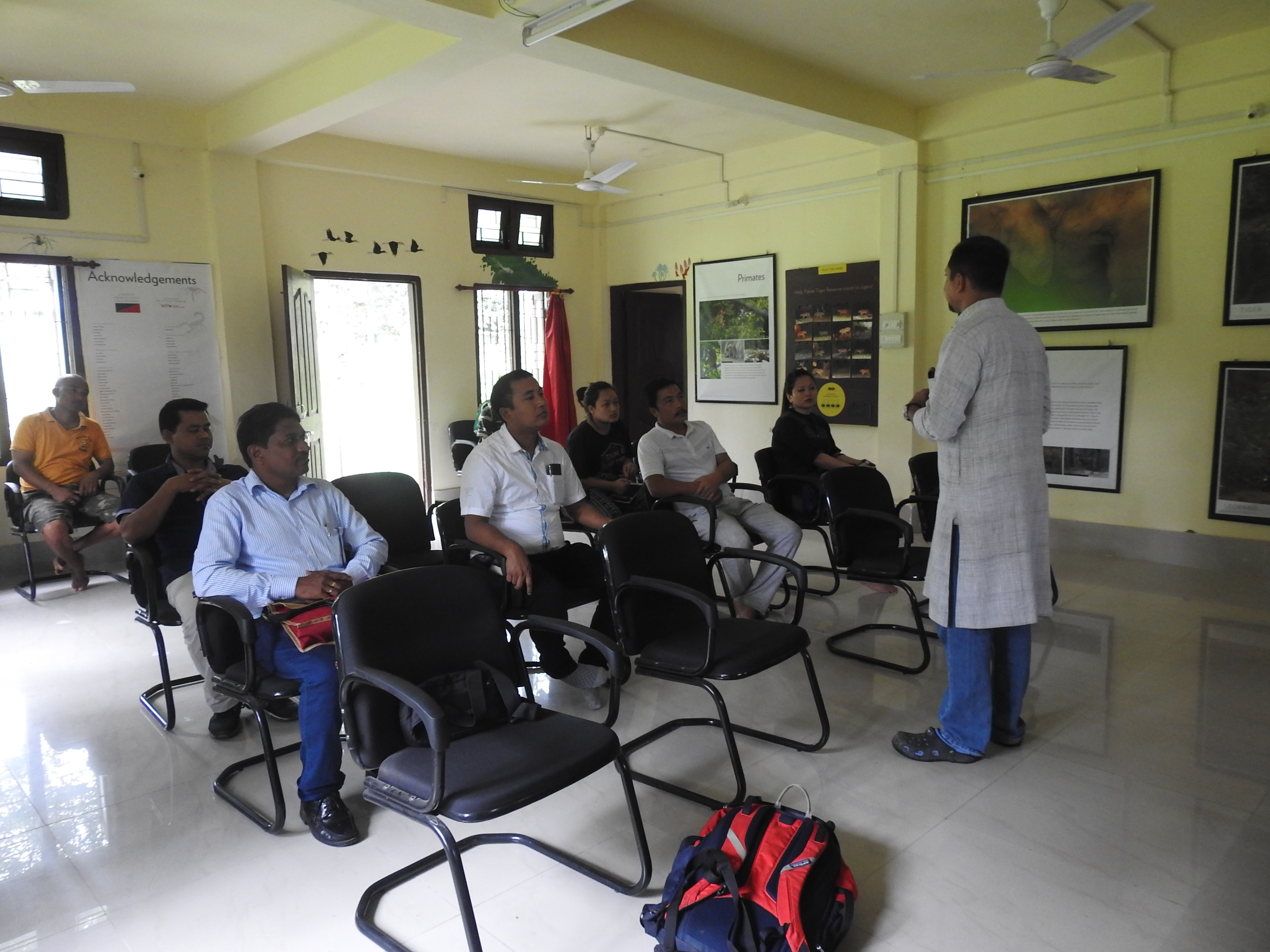
Teacher training workshop in Arunachal Pradesh

Aparajita Datta (born 1970) is an Indian wildlife ecologist who works for the Nature Conservation Foundation. Her research in the dense tropical forests of Arunachal Pradesh has successfully focused on hornbills, saving them from poachers. In 2013, she was one of eight conservationists to receive the Whitley Award. She is also a Co-Chair of the IUCN Hornbill Specialist Group.

== Biography ==
Born in Kolkata on 5 January 1970, in 1978 she moved with her family to Lusaka, Zambia, where her father worked as an accountant. Noticing her interest in nature, her teacher at the International School of Lusaka gave her special attention, inviting her to the school's zoo club. After five years in Africa, the family returned to India where, after completing high school, she studied botany at Presidency University, Kolkata. On graduating, she joined the Wildlife Institute of India where she earned a master's degree in wildlife ecology in 1993. While at the university, she met another wildlife ecology student, Charudutt Mishra, whom she married in 1999.

She then embarked on a doctorate at Saurashtra University in Rajkot, Gujarat, on India's west coast, but work on her thesis took her back to Arunachal Pradesh where she investigated the ecology of hornbills in Pakhui Wildlife Sanctuary, successfully completing her PhD. In it, she revealed that hornbills are vital for the environment as they spread tree seeds from over 80 species, some relying fully on hornbills. She called hornbills "the farmers of the forest".

In 2002, Datta moved to Mysuru in the Chamundi Hills where she began to work for the Nature Conservation Foundation and the Wildlife Conservation Society's India programme in order to investigate the effects of tribal hunting on the hornbill population. As a result of contacts with local hunters, she revealed the presence of the leaf deer and the black barking deer in India. Joining her husband Mishra and the wildlife biologist Mysore Doreswamy Madhusudan, she undertook an expedition to the heights of the Himalayas in Arunachal Pradesh where after sighting a Chinese goral, they found a new species of monkey named the Arunachal macaque.

Datta then embarked on the pioneering task of taking a census of wildlife in Arunachal including bears, tigers, clouded leopards and musk deer in Namdapha National Park. She also continued studying hornbills drawing on the assistance of former Lisu hunters and Nyishi tribesmen. She helped them to discontinue hunting by providing medical support, health care and kindergartens for their children. Datta explained her approach: "The Lisu people are right by our side. They’ve shown and told me things I would never otherwise have known. I think wildlife biologists often forget how much we depend on the insight of local people. To me part of the wonder of this incredible place is being there with the Lisu, sharing moments in the forest with them."

Datta and her team of biologists have also helped the Lisu people find alternative sources of income by developing the marketing of their handicrafts and the attractions of nature tourism in the area.

== Awards ==
- 2004: Sanctuary Asia's Earth Heroes Award (together with Charudutt Mishra)
- 2009: Women of Discovery Humanity Award for community-based conservation efforts
- 2010: National Geographic Emerging Explorer
- 2013: Whitley Award

== Books ==
- At the Feet of Living Things: Twenty-Five Years of Wildlife Research and Conservation in India, Edited by Aparajita Datta, Rohan Arthur, and T. R. Shankar Raman (2022). HarperCollins, Gurugram, 378 pages. ISBN 9789394407855.
- Trees of Arunachal Pradesh: A Field Guide, by Navendu Page, Aparajita Datta, and Bibidishananda Basu (2022). Nature Conservation Foundation, Mysuru, 591 pages. ISBN 9788195466344.
