= Citizen Sparrow =

www.citizensparrow.in

Citizen Sparrow is an ongoing citizen science project in India in which members of the public are encouraged to contribute information on presence and absence of the house sparrow. It is organised by Bombay Natural History Society and Ministry of Environment and Forests (India) in partnership with the National Centre for Biological Sciences and Nature Conservation Foundation. Several other Indian Non Governmental Organisations collaborate with this project.

== Aim of the project ==
Citizen Sparrow is a public participatory project in which all members of the public are encouraged to contribute information on presence and absence of the house sparrow. This project is motivated by the observation that house sparrows have declined in many parts of India, while in a few other parts their numbers are reported to be stable. Citizen Sparrow project provides a website where registered members can upload observations of presence and absence of house sparrow from different locations and for different time period. All the observational records are plotted on a map.

== Duration of the project ==
This project is planned to run for two months, that is, from 1 April 2012 to 31 May 2012. This project aimed to collect information and to answer few questions such as, where are sparrows still found in India? Where were they found before? Where have they declined the most? Have they actually increased in some place? At the end of the project a summary of the findings will be prepared and published online as a report. The patterns uncovered by the Citizen Sparrow project will be subsequently used to investigate change in sparrow population in more detail in India.

== Gallery ==
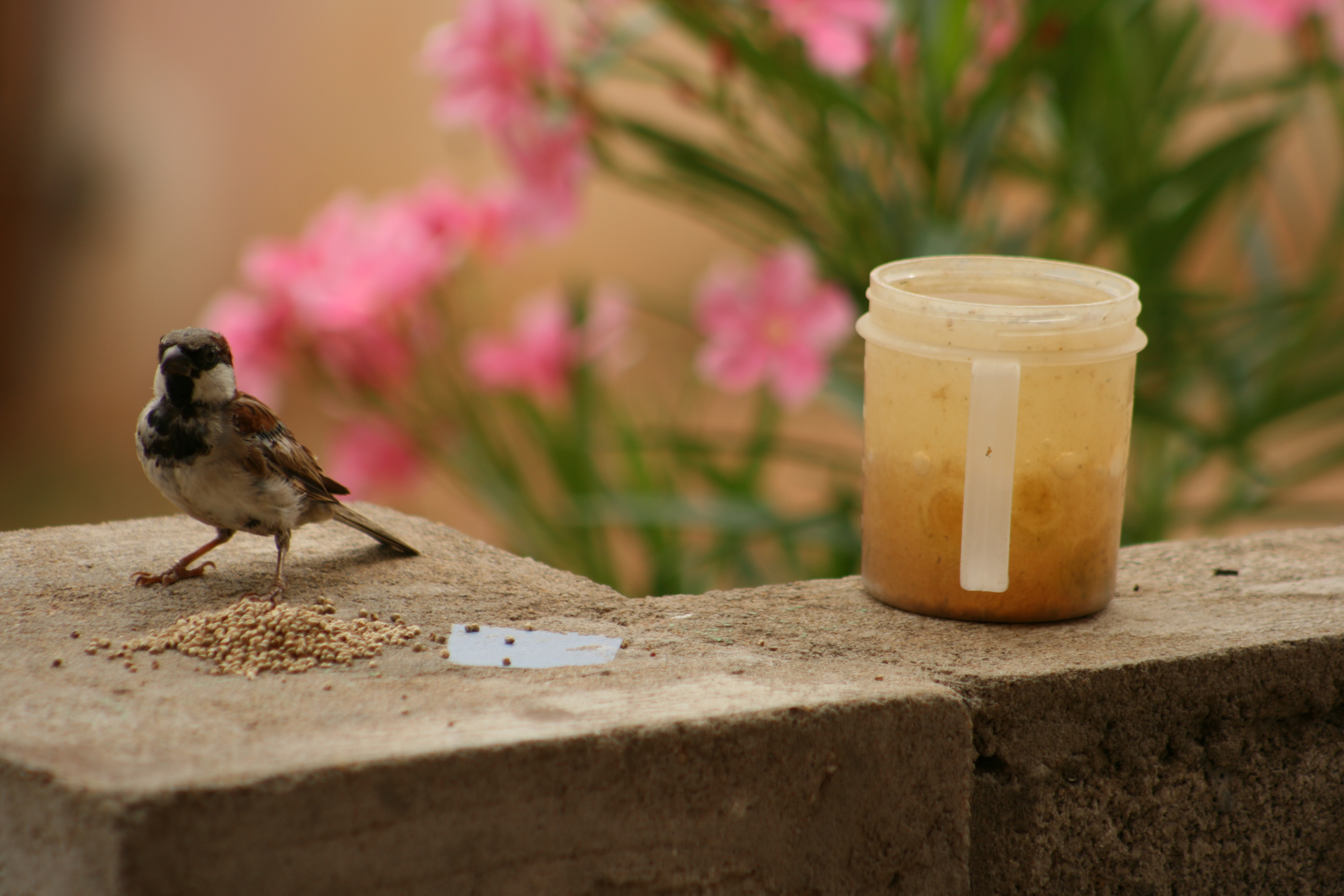
Male house sparrow

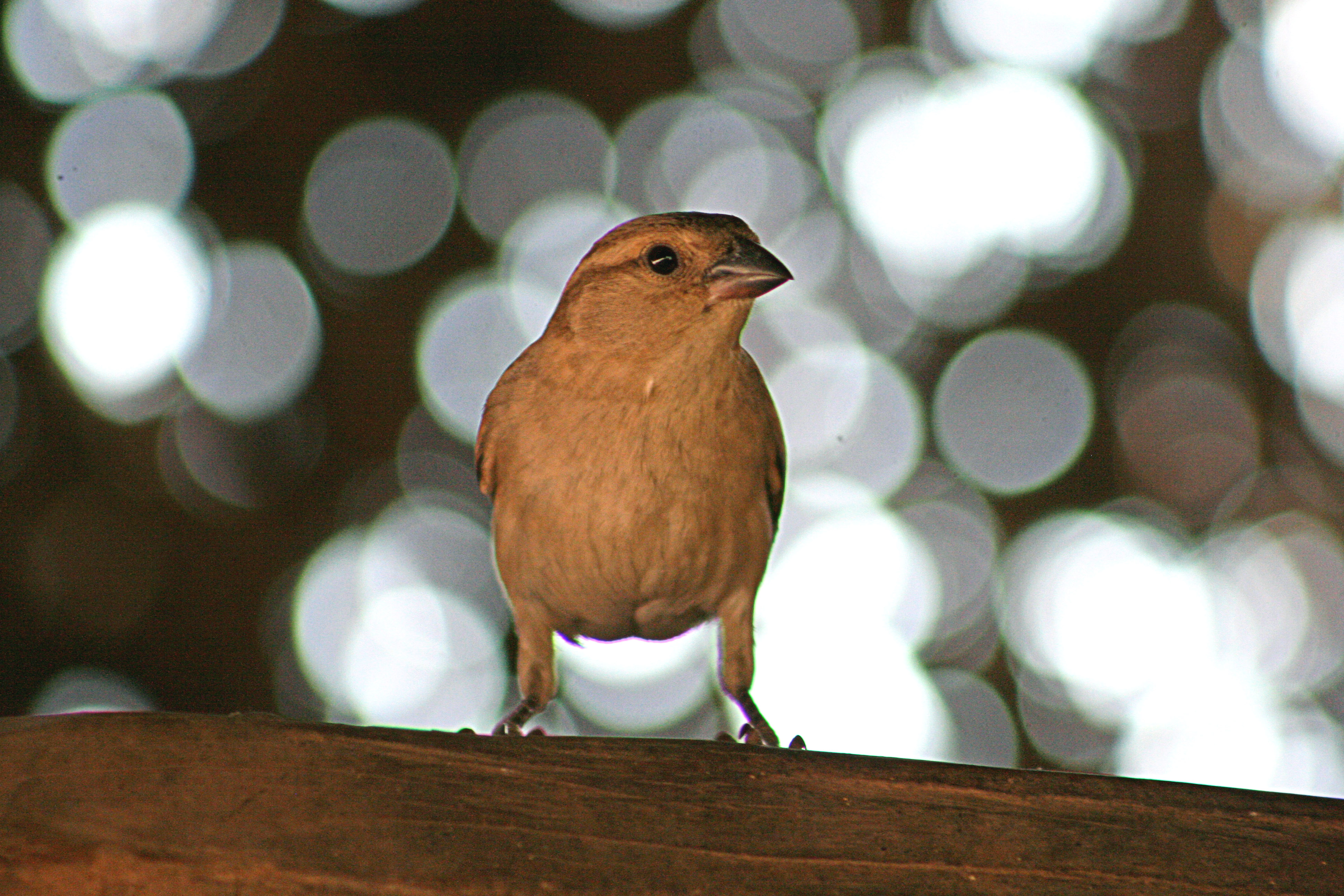
Female house sparrow

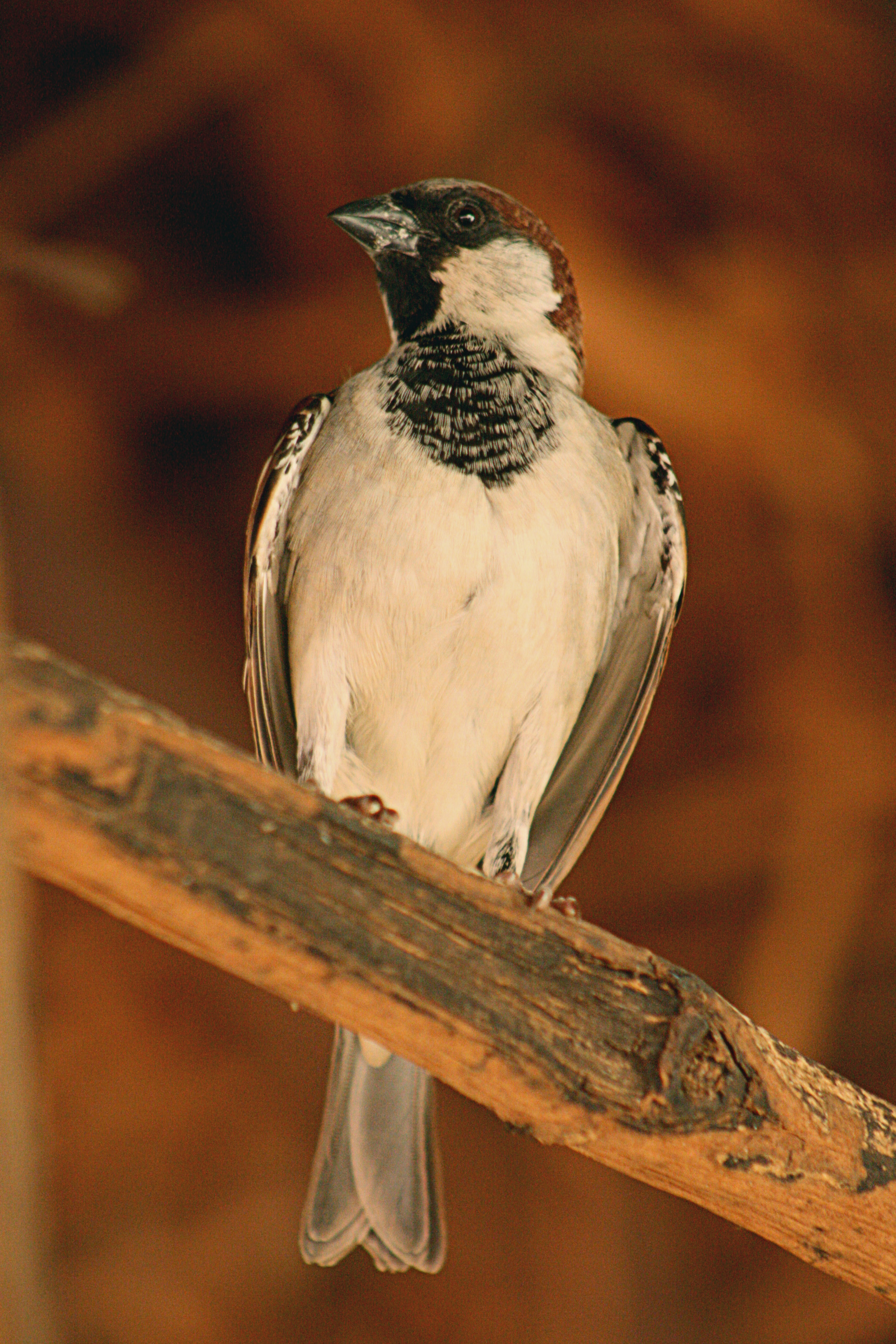
Male
