= Akdeniz Koruma Derneği =

Turkish conservation organization

Akdeniz Koruma Derneği (known in English as the Mediterranean Conservation Society) is a Turkish marine conservation organization.

The Society has been involved in the establishment of marine protected areas in Gökova, and monitoring of endangered Mediterranean monk seals. In 2013 and 2017, president Zafer Kizilkaya was granted a Whitley Award in recognition of the organization's contribution to conservation. In 2023, Kizilkaya was awarded the Goldman Environmental Prize for Asia.
