= Umusambi Village =

Umusambi Village, founded by the Rwanda Wildlife Conservation Association under the leadership of veterinarian Olivier Nsengimana, is a restored marshland in Kigali, Rwanda that serves as a shelter for more than 50 vulnerable grey crowned cranes (Balearica regulorum) rescued from the illicit pet trade.

These varieties of birds have been handicapped by captivity and cannot be released back into the wild. Umusambi village provides these birds with a stimulating setting in which they may reconnect with nature.

== Background ==
Nsengimana started the Umusambi Village project in 2014. The goal was to put an end to the illegal crane trade, promote awareness, and release numerous captive cranes back into the wild, in Akagera National Park.

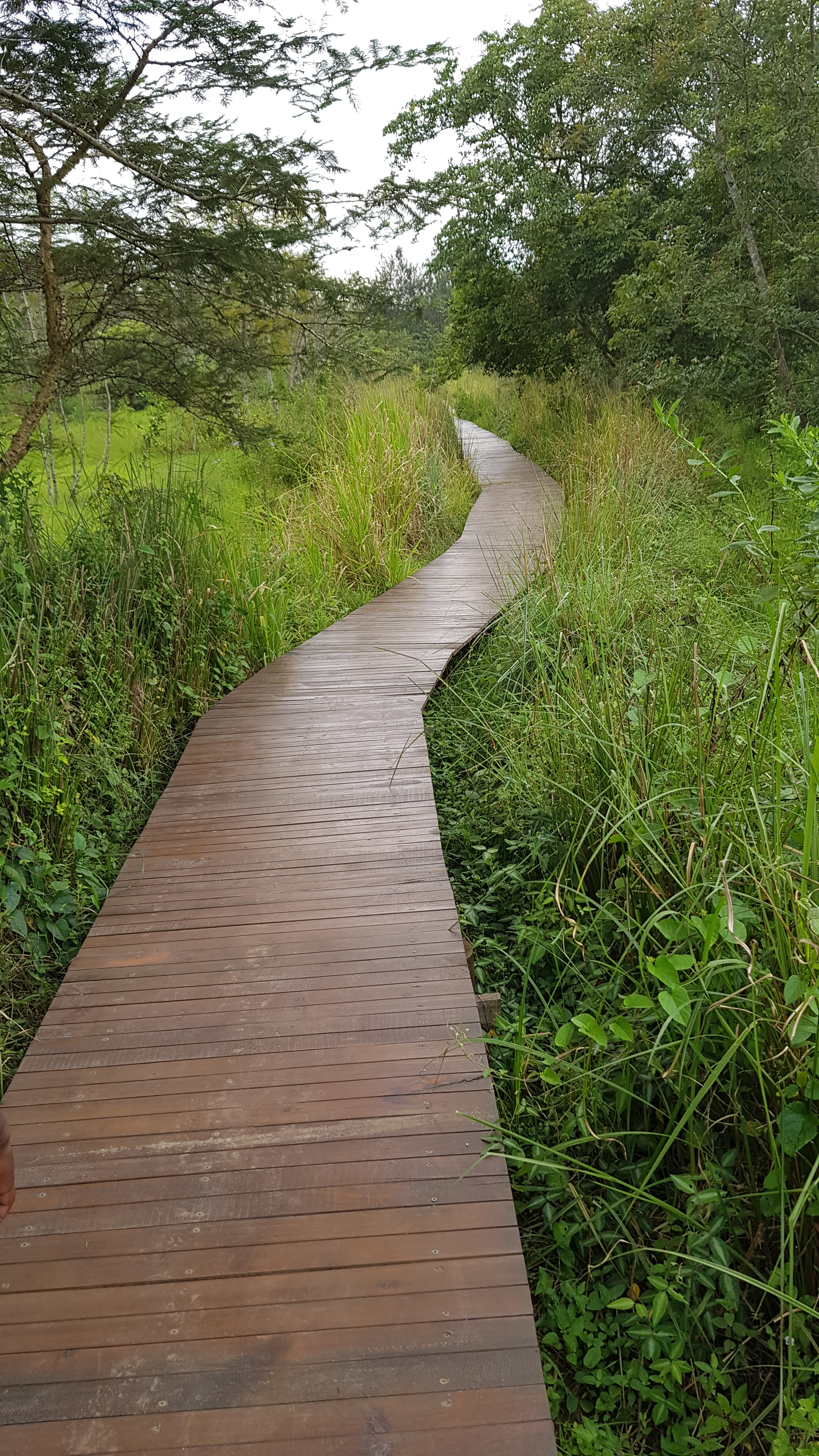

During the project, they discovered that several cranes had been crippled due to their imprisonment. This is frequently associated with their seizure and transportation, as well as clipping their wings to keep them from flying away, which can go catastrophically wrong if done without skill.
