= Iroro Tanshi =

Nigerian ecologist and conservationist

- Born: 1984 or 1985 (age 40–41)
- Occupations: Conservationist, ecologist
- Employer(s): University Of Benin; Small Mammal Conservation Organisation
- Awards: Whitley Award (2021); Future for Nature Award (2020)

Iroro Tanshi (born 1984 or 1985) is a Nigerian tropical ecologist and conservationist who studies the ecology and diversity of African bats. She is a co-founder of the Small Mammal Conservation Organisation (SMACON), a Nigerian Non-Governmental (NGO) where she serves as the Director of Research Programs and mentor students and peers in species conservation.

== Education ==
Tanshi obtained a degree in Environmental Science and a master's degree in Environmental Quality Management at the University of Benin in Benin City, Nigeria. She then studied at the University of Leeds in England, where she obtained a master's in Biodiversity Conservation before undertaking research with Tigga Kingston at Texas Tech University in the US, where she was awarded a PhD in 2021.

== Career ==
Tanshi discovered the only population of the short-tailed roundleaf bat (Hipposideros curtus) in Nigeria, near the Afi Mountain Wildlife Sanctuary, and saved it from extinction. Tanshi also protected Nigeria's largest colony of straw-coloured fruit bats (Eidolon helvum) from a government proposal to destroy their roost tree.

Tanshi was recognized for discovering bat species in Nigeria that were last seen 45 years ago. Her 'Zero Wildfire Campaign', engages local people to protect critical habitats for this bat species is yielding results and is helping bring back this species from the brink of extinction.

In parallel with her work at SMACON, Tanshi works as a lecturer at the University of Benin.

== Awards ==
In 2020, Tanshi won a Future for Nature award from the Future for Nature Foundation, in recognition of her pioneering work discovering bat species. She was the first African woman to win the award.

In 2021, Tanshi won a Whitley Award issued by the Whitley Fund for Nature.

In 2026, she was awarded the Goldman Environmental Prize.
