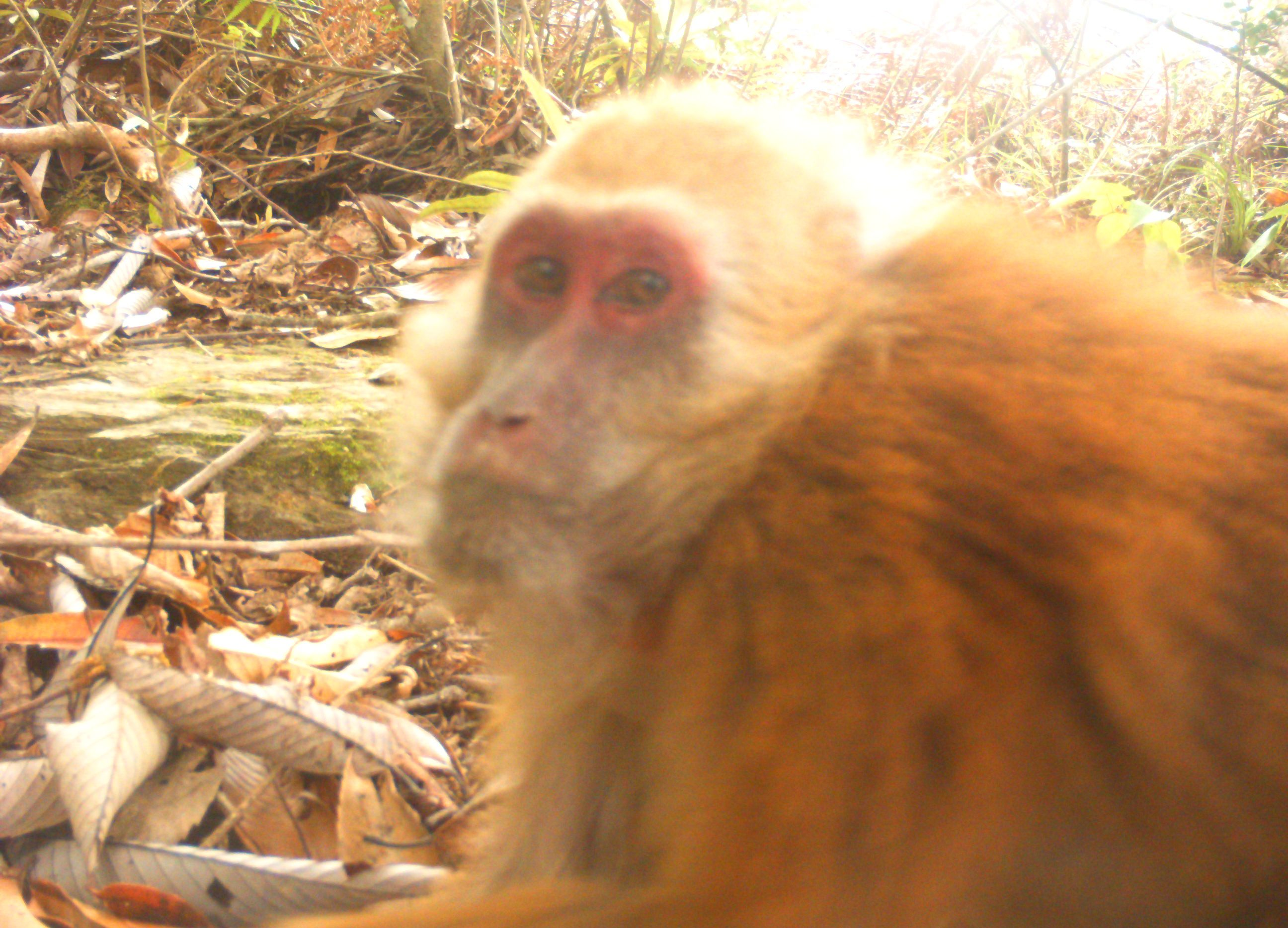
- Arunachal macaque from Bugun and Shertukpen forests around Eaglenest WLS

Conservation status
- Endangered (IUCN 3.1)

Scientific classification
- Kingdom: Animalia
- Phylum: Chordata
- Class: Mammalia
- Order: Primates
- Family: Cercopithecidae
- Genus: Macaca
- Species: M. munzala

Binomial name
- Macaca munzala Sinha, Datta, Madhusudan, and Mishra, 2005
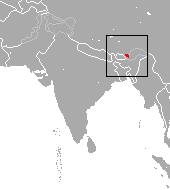
- Arunachal macaque range

= Arunachal macaque =

Species of Old World monkey

The Arunachal macaque (Macaca munzala) is a macaque native to Eastern Himalayas of Bhutan, China and India. It is listed as Endangered on the IUCN Red List.

It was scientifically described in 2005.

It is a relatively large brown primate with a comparatively short tail. Its species name comes from mun zala, meaning deep forest (mun) monkey (monkey), as it is called by the Monpa people of West Kameng and Tawang.

== Discovery ==
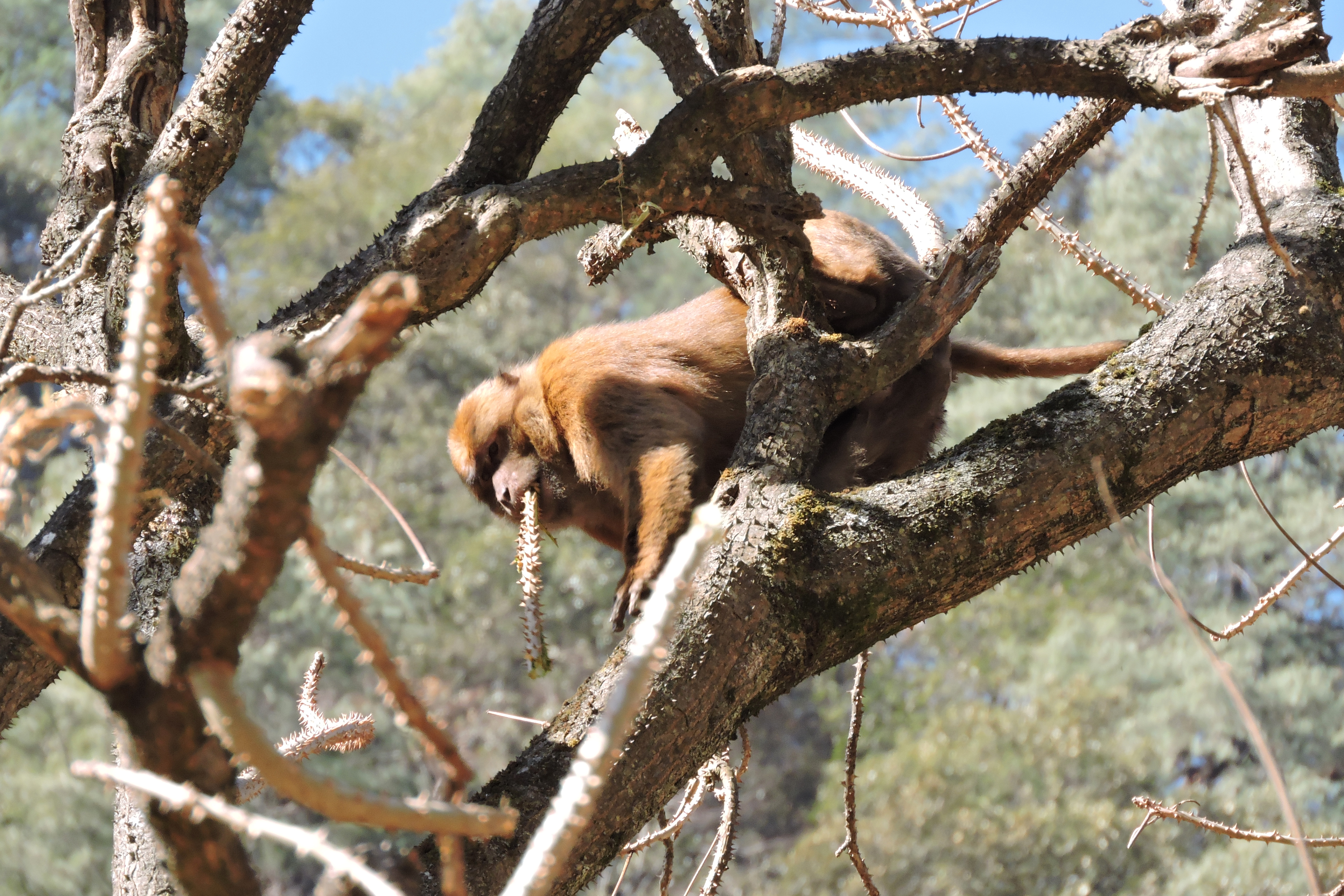
A camera trap photograph of Arunachal macaques in India

It was discovered as a new taxon in 1997 by the Indian primatologist Anwaruddin Choudhury, but he thought it to be a new subspecies of the Tibetan macaque (M. thibetana). It was described as a new species in 2005 by a group of scientists from the Nature Conservation Foundation, India. It is the first species of macaque to have been discovered since 1903, when the Indonesian Pagai Island macaque was discovered. This monkey was reported on the basis of a good quality photograph as the holotype. In 2011, some researchers suggested, on the basis of morphological variation within the Assamese macaque, that it might be better treated as a subspecies.

Subsequently, it was also discovered in Bhutan, where it was observed and photographed in the Trashi Yangshi area in 2006.

== Description ==
The Arunachal macaque is compactly built and has a very dark face. It lives at high altitudes, between 2000 m and 3500 m above sea level, making it one of the highest-dwelling primates. It belongs to the M. sinica species-group of macaques, along with the Assamese macaque (M. assamensis), the Tibetan macaque, the bonnet macaque (M. radiata) and the toque macaque (M. sinica).

The Arunachal macaque is apparently physically similar to the Assam and Tibetan macaques, while genetically closely related to the bonnet macaque of southern India. This is probably the result of convergent evolution, where organisms evolve similar physical features due to similar environmental selection pressure, while genetically they may have different origins.

Kumar et al. (2008) and Sinha et al. (2006) report at least 569 individuals in thirty-five troops; thirty-two troops in Tawang and three troops in West Kameng. The monkey is severely persecuted in some parts of its known distribution by locals retaliating against crop raiding.
