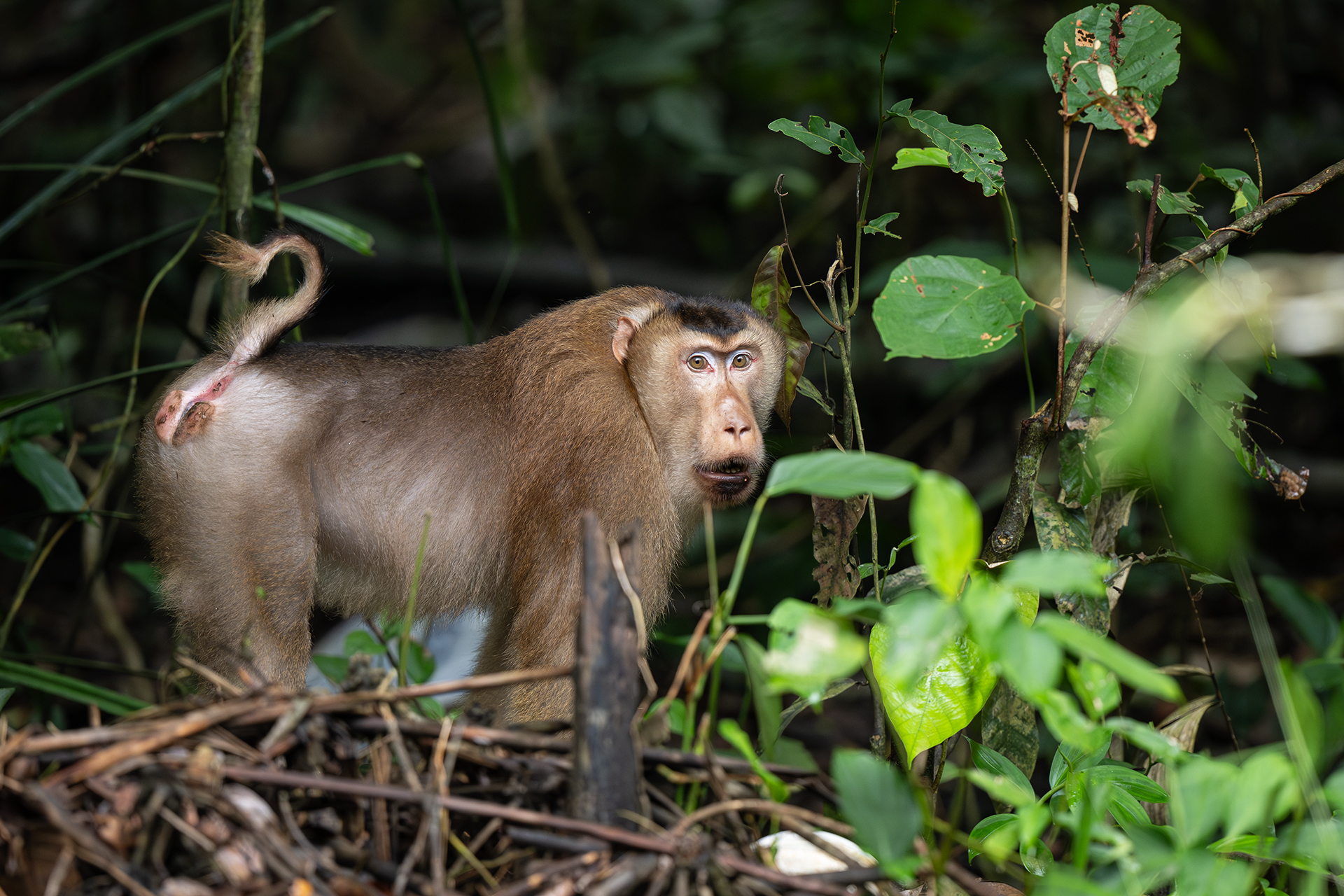
- On the banks of Kinabatangan River, Sabah, Malaysia

Conservation status
- Endangered (IUCN 3.1)

Scientific classification
- Kingdom: Animalia
- Phylum: Chordata
- Class: Mammalia
- Infraclass: Placentalia
- Order: Primates
- Family: Cercopithecidae
- Genus: Macaca
- Species: M. nemestrina

Binomial name
- Macaca nemestrina (Linnaeus, 1766)
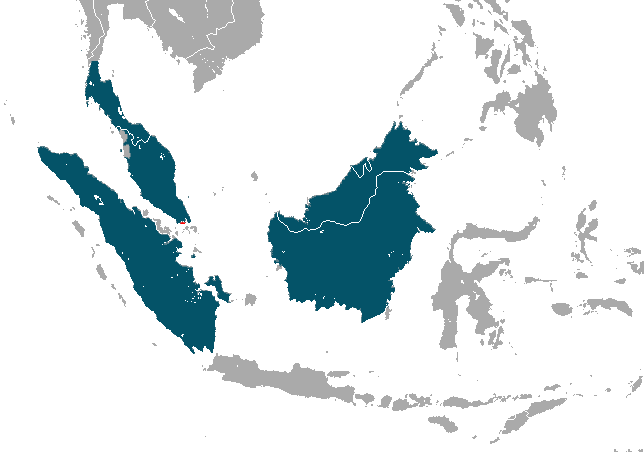
- Southern pig-tailed macaque range

Synonyms
- List: Macaca broca Miller, 1906; Macaca carpolegus (Raffles, 1821); Macaca fusca (Shaw, 1800); Macaca libidinosus I. Geoffroy, 1826; Macaca longicruris (Link, 1795); Macaca maimon (de Blainville, 1839); Macaca nucifera Sody, 1936; Macaca platypygos (Schreber, 1774); Simia nemestrina Linnaeus, 1766

= Southern pig-tailed macaque =

Species of macaque

The southern pig-tailed macaque (Macaca nemestrina), also known as the Sundaland pig-tailed macaque and the Sunda pig-tailed macaque, is a medium-sized macaque that lives in Sundaland, southern Thailand, Malaysia, and Indonesia. It is known locally as beruk.

== Etymology and taxonomy ==
The species epithet, nemestrina, is an adjective (derived from Latin Nemestrinus, meaning "the god of groves") modified to agree in gender with the feminine generic name. M. nemestrina formerly included the northern pig-tailed, Pagai Island, and Siberut macaques as subspecies. All four are now considered separate species.

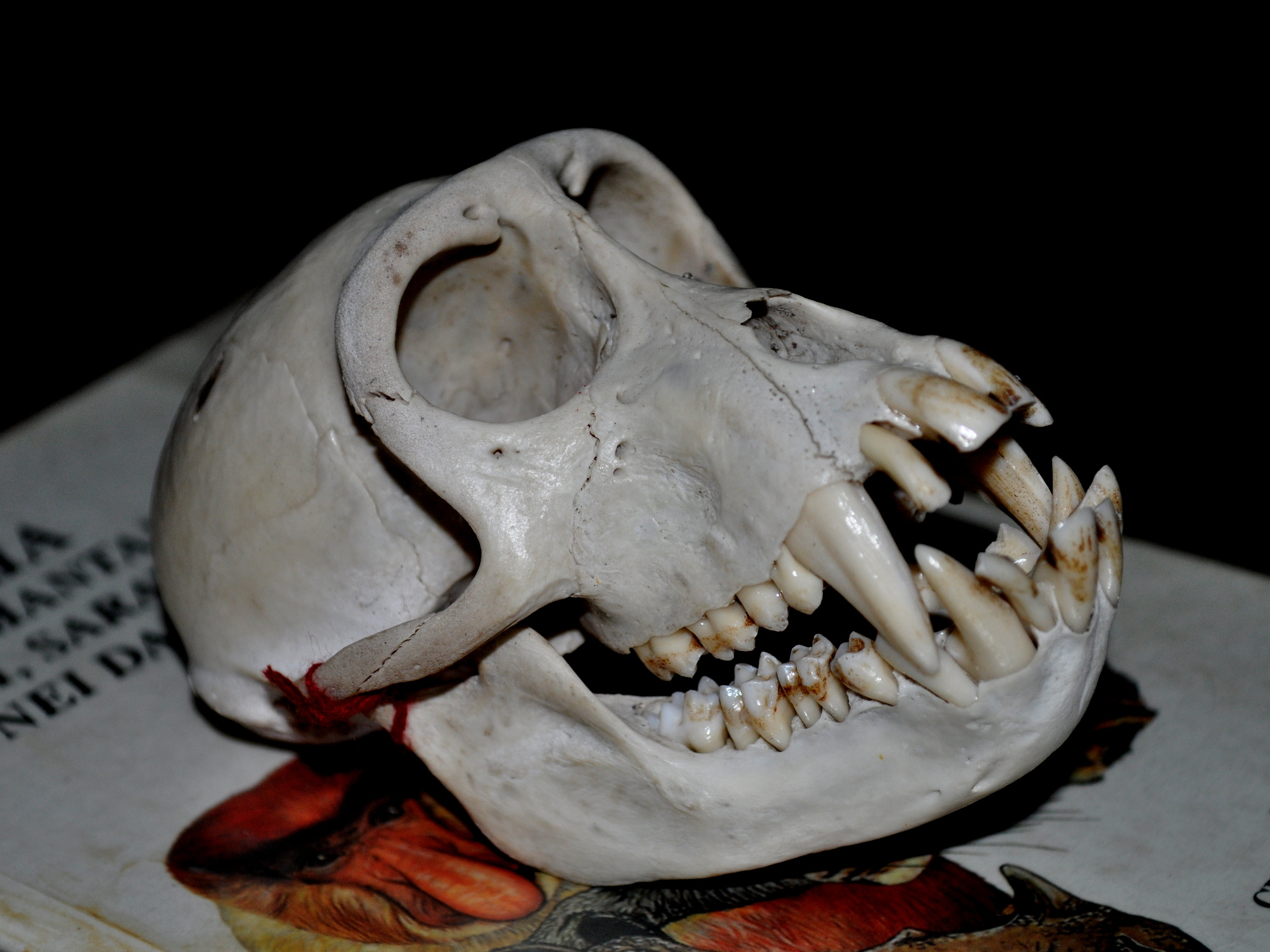
Skull of a southern pig-tailed macaque

In the 19th century, bruh was the native name used by Malays in Sumatra for the macaque.

== Description ==
As with other Macaca species, males are larger than females; while males are measured at 50–58 cm (20–23 in) in length and 5–12 kg (11–26 lb) in weight, females are measured at 38–48 cm (15–19 in) in length and 4.5–6 kg (9.9–13.2 lb) in weight. This macaque has buff-brown fur, with a darker dorsal area and lighter ventral area. Its common name refers to the short tail held semi-erect, resembling the tail of a pig.

== Behaviour and ecology ==
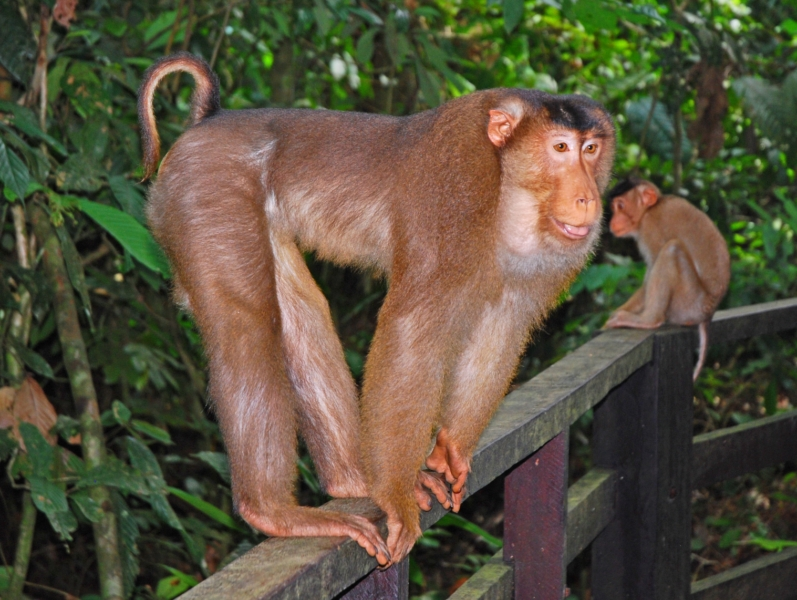
M. nemestrina at Sepilok, Sabah, Malaysia

M. nemestrina is mainly terrestrial, but also a skilled climber. Unlike almost all primates, these macaques love water. They live in large groups that split into smaller groups during daytime when they are foraging. They are omnivorous, feeding mainly on fruits, seeds, berries, cereals, fungi, and invertebrates. A study in peninsular Malaysia found them to be the primary, and perhaps the only, seed dispersers of the rattan species Calamus calicarpus (syn. Daemonorops calicarpa) and Calamus castaneus.

There is a hierarchy among males, based on strength, and among females, based on heredity. Thus, the daughter of the alpha female will immediately be placed above all other females in the group. The alpha female leads the group, while the male role is more to manage conflict within the group and to defend it.

Female gestation lasts around 5.7 months. She will give birth to one infant every two years. Weaning occurs at 4–5 months. Sexual maturity is reached at 3–5 years.

In Thailand, they have been trained for 400 years to harvest coconuts.

== Habitat and distribution ==
This macaque is mostly found in rainforest up to 2,000 metres (6,600 ft), but will also enter plantations and gardens.

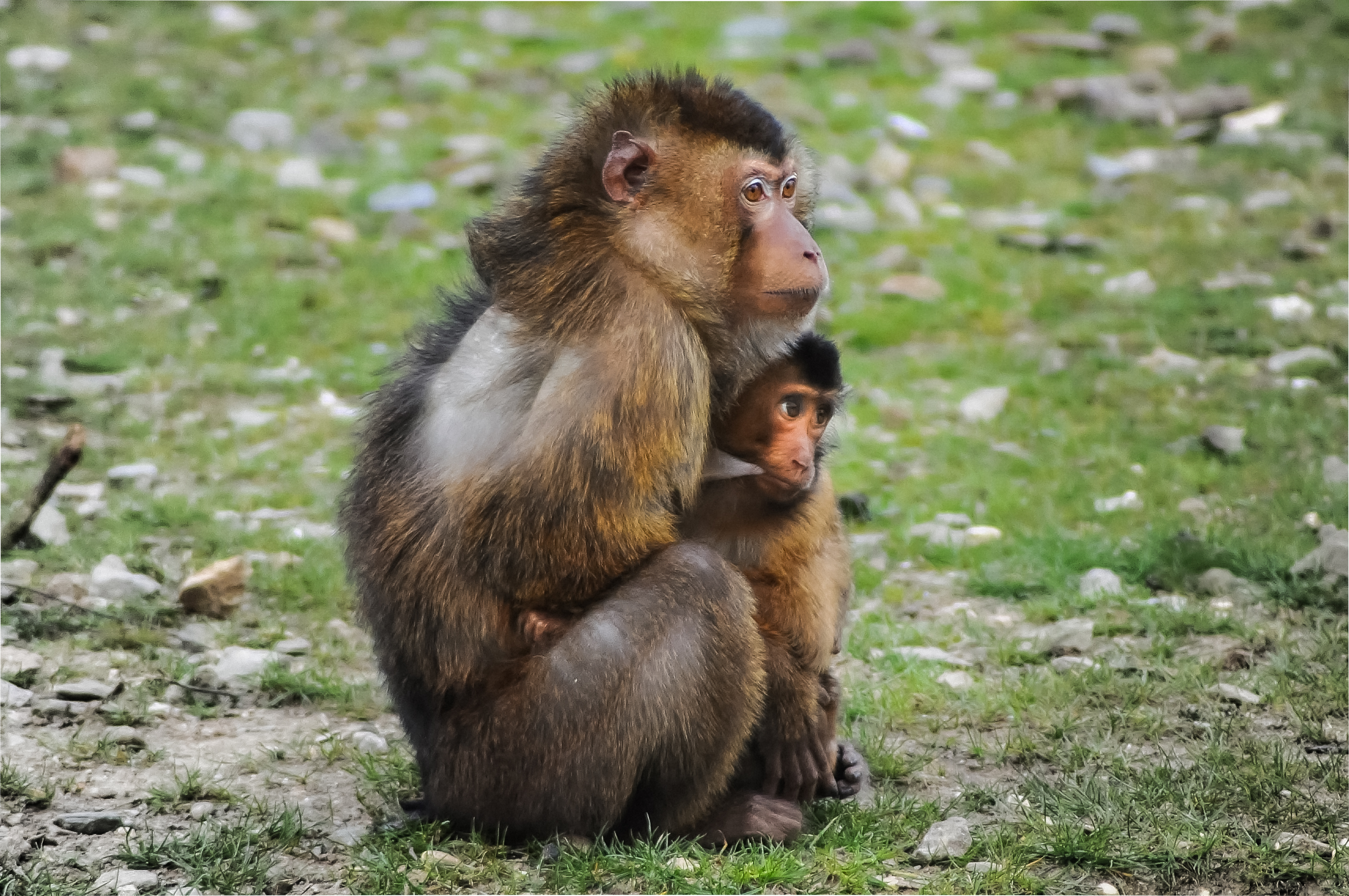
Southern pig-tailed macaque, nursing her baby

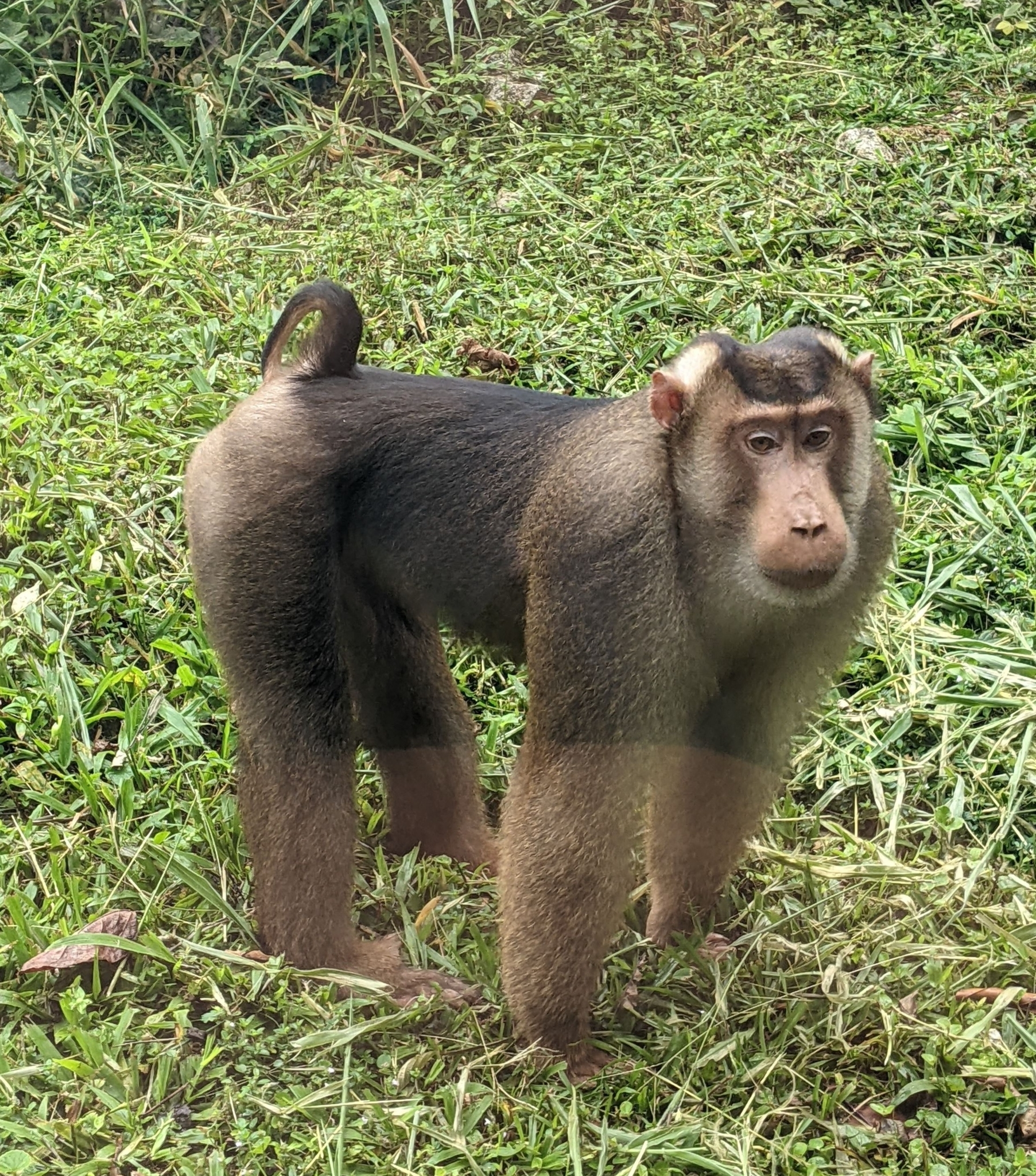
Southern pig-tailed macaque in Malaysia

It is found in the southern half of the Malay Peninsula (only just extending into southernmost Thailand), Borneo, Sumatra and Bangka Island. There are reports of the species having been present in Singapore before 1950, but these were likely escaped pets. The only pig-tailed macaques in Singapore today are introduced monkeys.

== Predation ==
Potential predators of southern pig-tailed macaques in East Kalimantan include reticulated pythons.

== Diet ==
M. nemestrina is omnivorous. Its diet in the wild consists mainly of fruits such as figs, mangoes, rambutan, and durian. However, it has been recorded to raid crops and eat human-farmed aubergine, maize, rice, papaya, and more commonly cultivated crops in Indonesia, Malaysia and Thailand. As for its consumption of animals, it primarily consumes swarming insects, spiders and grasshoppers.

== Interaction with humans ==
Since the 19th century, monkeys including the southern pig-tailed macaque, have been used by humans to harvest coconuts in southeast Asia.
