= Edward Whitley =

Edward Whitley may refer to:

- Edward Whitley (environmentalist), British industrialist, environmentalist and philanthropist
- Edward Whitley (politician) (1825–1892), English solicitor and Conservative Member of Parliament
