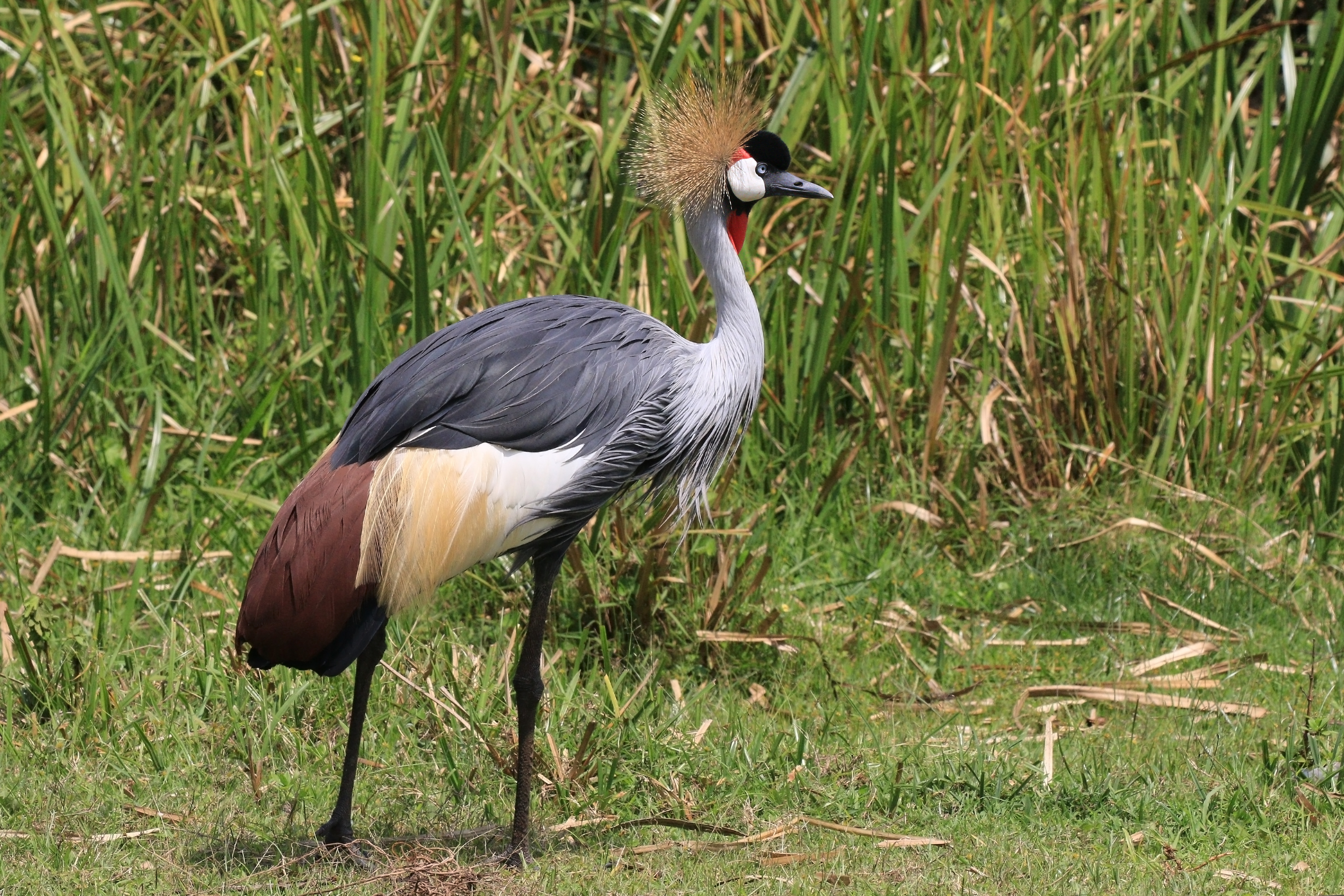
- A grey crowned crane in Uganda

Conservation status
- Endangered (IUCN 3.1)
- CITES Appendix II

Scientific classification
- Kingdom: Animalia
- Phylum: Chordata
- Class: Aves
- Order: Gruiformes
- Family: Gruidae
- Genus: Balearica
- Species: B. regulorum

Binomial name
- Balearica regulorum (Bennett, 1834)

= Grey crowned crane =

Species of bird in the family Gruidae

The grey crowned crane or gray crowned crane (Balearica regulorum) is a large crane species native to Sub-Saharan Africa. It occurs mainly in dry savannah, although it nests in somewhat wetter habitats, and can also be found in marshes, cultivated lands and grassy flatlands near rivers and lakes. Its body plumage is mainly grey and it has white cheeks, a red throat patch, and a stiff golden crown. It is omnivorous, consuming a wide variety of animal and plant matter, including plants, seeds, grain, insects, frogs, worms, snakes, small fish and the eggs of aquatic animals. It is listed as endangered on the IUCN Red List. It is the national bird of Uganda.

== Taxonomy ==
Other names for the species include African crowned crane, golden crested crane, golden crowned crane, East African crane, East African crowned crane, African crane, Eastern crowned crane, Kavirondo crane, South African crane, and crested crane. It is closely related to the black crowned crane, and the two species have sometimes been treated as the same species. The two are separable on the basis of genetic evidence, calls, plumage, and bare parts, and all authorities treat them as different species today.

There are two subspecies. The East African B. r. gibbericeps (crested crane) occurs in the east of the Democratic Republic of the Congo and in Uganda, of which it is the national bird represented in its national flag, and Kenya to eastern South Africa. It has a larger area of bare red facial skin above the white patch than the smaller nominate species, B. r. regulorum (South African crowned crane), which breeds from Angola south to South Africa.

== Description ==
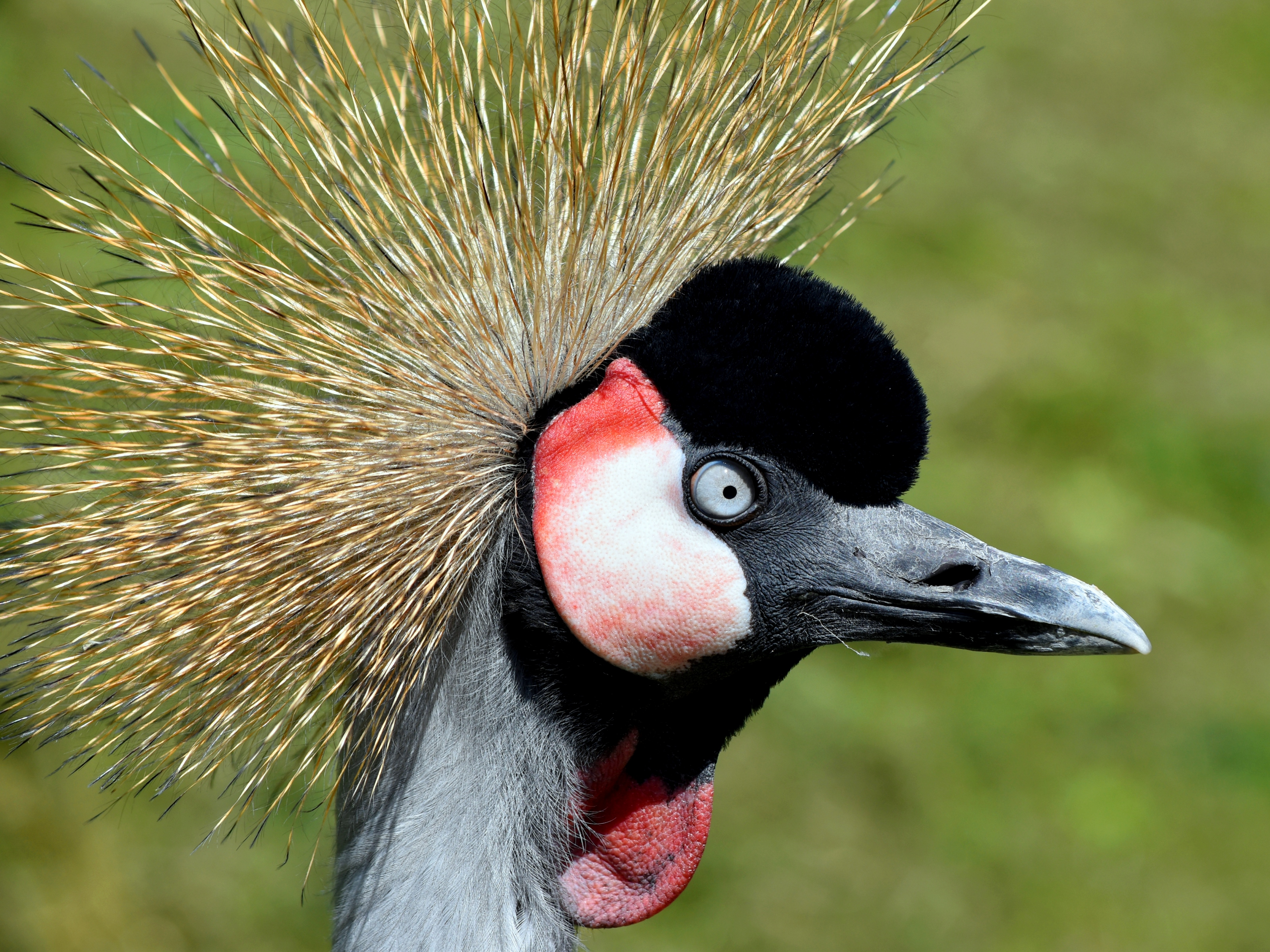
Head profile of the grey crowned crane in Vogelpark Heiligenkirchen

The grey crowned crane is approximately 1 m (3 ft 3 in) tall, weighs 3.5 kg (7.7 lb), and has a wingspan of 2 m (6 ft 7 in). Its body plumage is mainly grey. The wings are predominantly white, dark grey and dark red with a golden yellow patch. The head has a crown of stiff golden feathers. The sides of the face are white, and there is a bright red inflatable throat pouch. The bill is relatively short and grey, and the legs are black. They have long legs for wading through the grasses. The feet are large, yet slender, adapted for balance rather than defence or grasping. The sexes are similar, although males tend to be slightly larger. Younger cranes are greyer than adults, with a feathered buff face.

This species and the black crowned crane are the only cranes that can roost in trees, because of a long hind toe that can grasp branches. This trait is assumed to be an ancestral trait among the cranes, which has been lost in the other subfamily. Crowned cranes also lack a coiled trachea and have loose plumage compared to the other cranes.

== Distribution and habitat ==
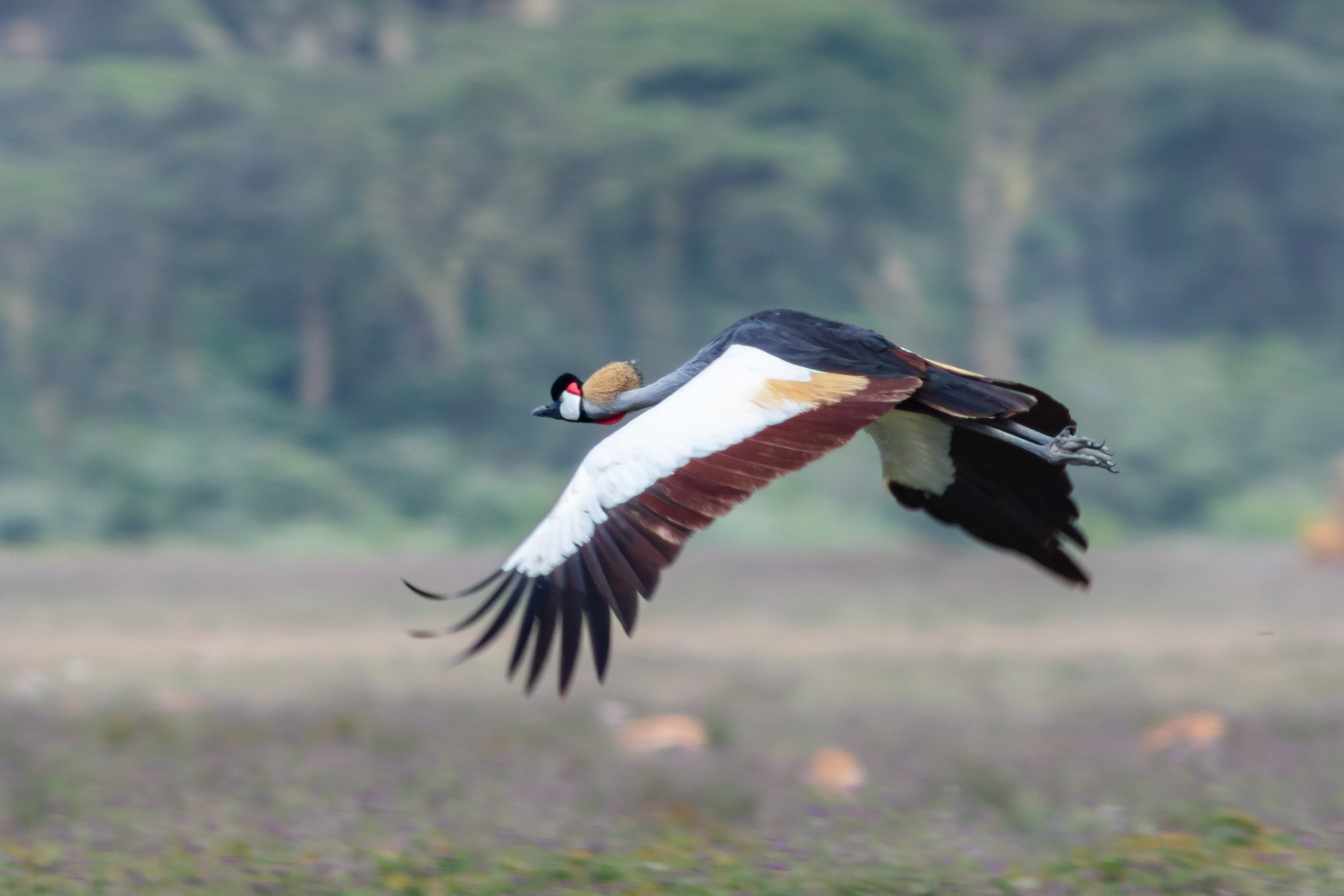
In flight

The grey crowned crane occurs in dry savannah in Sub-Saharan Africa, although it nests in somewhat wetter habitats. They can also be found in marshes, cultivated lands and grassy flatlands near rivers and lakes in Uganda and Kenya and as far south as South Africa. This animal does not have set migration patterns, and birds nearer the tropics are typically sedentary. Birds in more arid areas, particularly Namibia, make localised seasonal movements during drier periods.

== Behaviour ==
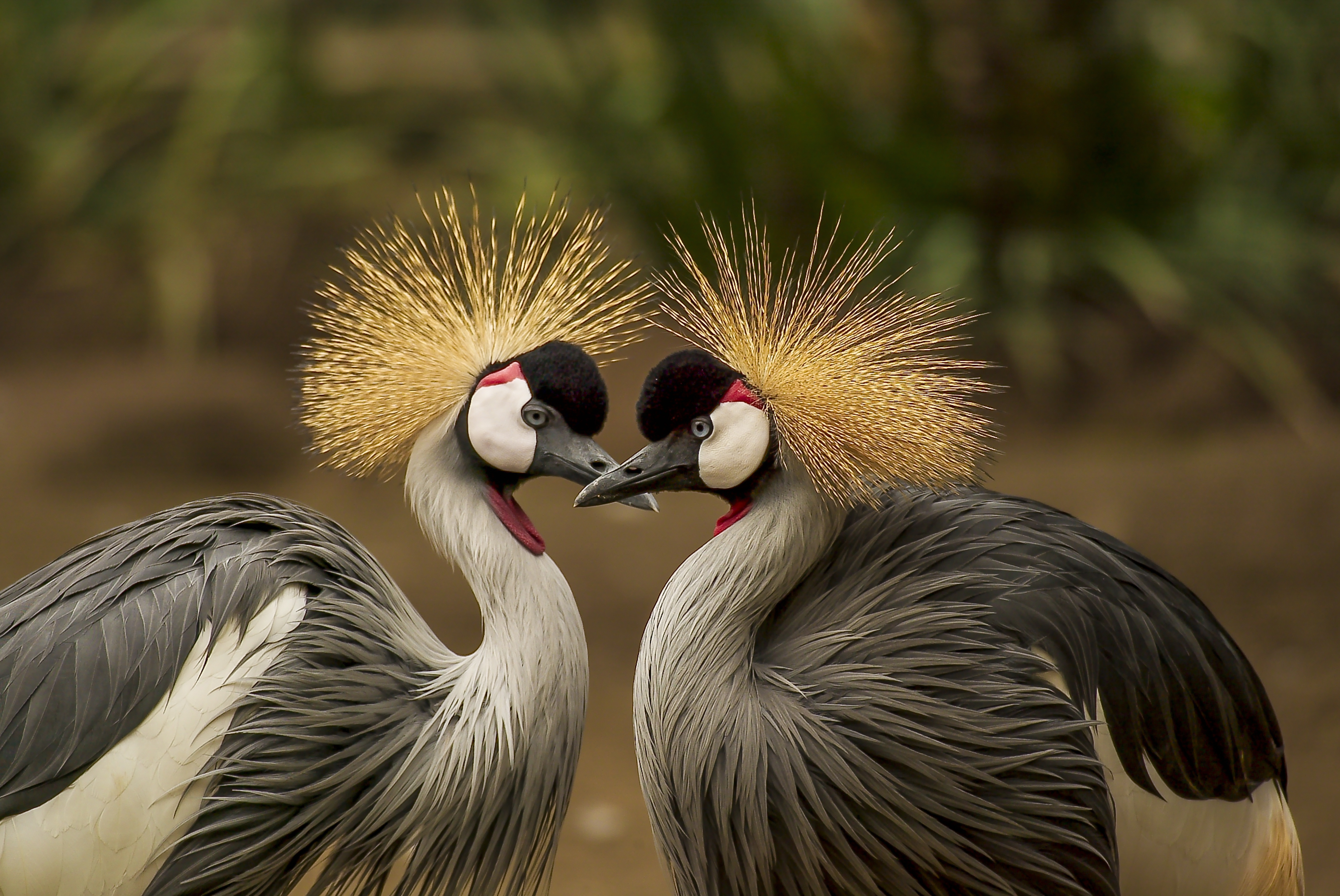
Two adults face to face

The grey crowned crane has a breeding display involving dancing, bowing, and jumping. It has a booming call which involves inflation of the red gular sac. It also makes a honking sound quite different from the trumpeting of other crane species. Both sexes dance, and immature birds join the adults. Dancing is an integral part of courtship, but also may be done at any time of the year.

Flocks of 30–150 birds are not uncommon.

=== Diet and feeding ===
These cranes are omnivores, eating plants, seeds, grain, insects, frogs, worms, snakes, small fish and the eggs of aquatic animals. Stamping their feet as they walk, they flush out insects which are quickly caught and eaten. The birds also associate with grazing herbivores, benefiting from the ability to grab prey items disturbed by antelopes and gazelles. They spend their entire day looking for food. At night, the crowned crane spends its time in the trees sleeping and resting.

=== Breeding ===
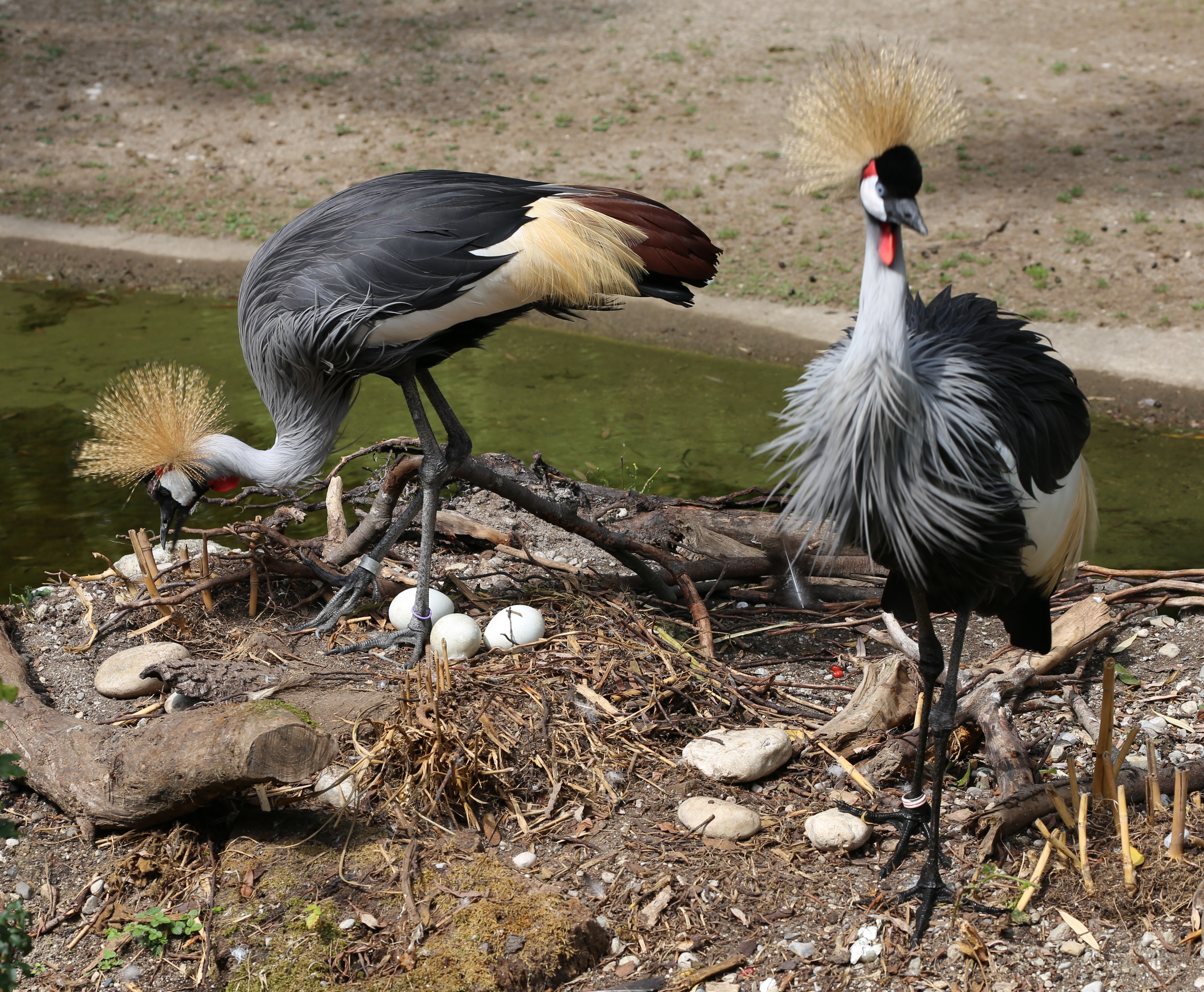
With nest in Hellabrunn Zoo, Munich

Grey crowned cranes time their breeding season around the rains, although the effect varies geographically. In East Africa the species breeds year-round, but most frequently during the drier periods, whereas in Southern Africa the breeding season is timed to coincide with the rains. During the breeding season, pairs of cranes construct a large nest; a platform of grass and other plants in tall wetland vegetation.

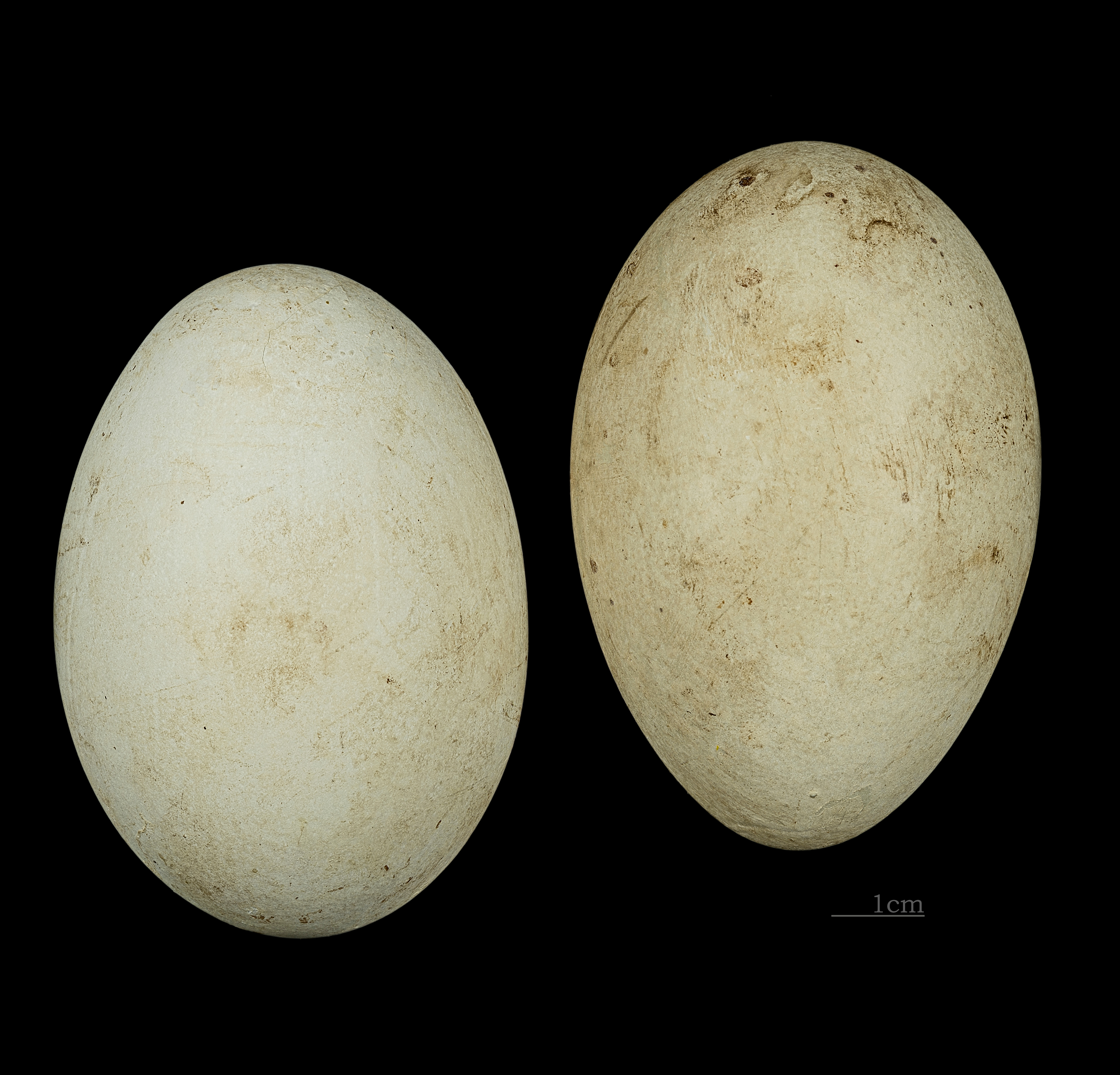
Eggs of B. r. gibbericeps at the MHNT

The grey crowned crane lays a clutch of 2–5 glossy, dirty-white eggs, which are incubated by both sexes for 28–31 days. Chicks are precocial, can run as soon as they hatch, and fledge in 56–100 days. Once they are fully grown and independent, chicks of different sexes will separate from their parents to start their own family. Grey crowned cranes have been seen to congregate in large numbers in a ceremony akin to a wedding when two chicks are being married off. The new couple dance for a while before flying off together to start a new family.

== Relationship with humans ==
=== Status and conservation ===
Although the grey crowned crane remains common over some of its range, it faces threats to its habitat due to drainage, overgrazing, and pesticide pollution. Their global population is estimated to be between 58,000 and 77,000 individuals. In 2012 it was uplisted from vulnerable to endangered by the IUCN. Olivier Nsengimana has received many honours, including the Whitley Award, the Future For Nature Award, the Rolex Award for Enterprise, and the Time 100 Next, for his conservation work on this species.

=== Symbolism ===
Flag of Uganda

The grey crowned crane is the national bird of Uganda and features in the country's flag and coat of arms.

A grey crowned crane appears in the film The Bird with the Crystal Plumage as the fictitious bird, Hornitus Nevalis, of the film title.
