= Purnima Devi Barman =

Indian biologist

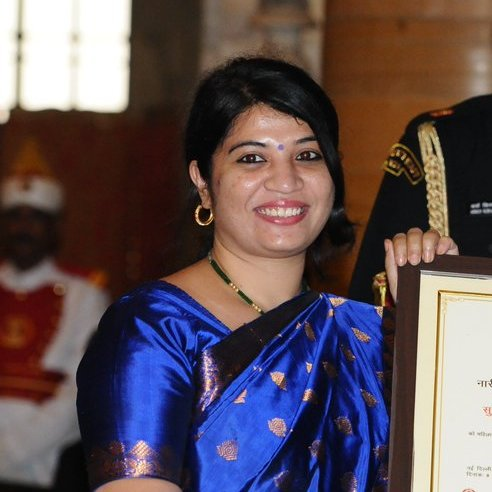
- Barman receiving Nari Shakti Puraskar on 8 March 2018
- Born: 1980 (age 45–46); Pub Majir Gaon, Kamrup region, Assam, India
- Education: Gauhati University (MSc, PhD)
- Occupation: Wildlife biologist
- Organization: Aaranyak
- Known for: Bird conservation Hargila Army
- Awards: Earth Heroes Award (2016); Whitley Awards (2017); Nari Shakti Puraskar

Purnima Devi Barman is a wildlife biologist from Assam, India. She is known for her conservation work with the greater adjutant stork (Leptoptilos dubius), known locally as the Hargila. She is the founder of the Hargila Army, an all-female conservation initiative. In 2017, Barman was the recipient of both the Whitley Award for her conservation efforts and the Nari Shakti Puraskar, the highest women-exclusive civilian award, presented by the President of India.

== Biography ==
Purnima Devi Barman attended Gauhati University in Assam, where she obtained her Masters in Zoology, with a specialization in Ecology and Wildlife Biology. In 2007 she started her PhD research, but she delayed finishing it until 2019 in order to focus on community conservation education in villages in rural Assam. Barman has worked as a Senior Wildlife Biologist in the Avifauna Research and Conservation Division at Aaranyak, a non-government organization for biodiversity conservation, where she coordinated Aaranyak's greater adjutant stork conservation project. Barman is also a Director at WiNN (Women in Nature Network) India, and a Member of the IUCN Stork, Ibis and Spoon bill Specialist Group.

== Greater adjutant ==
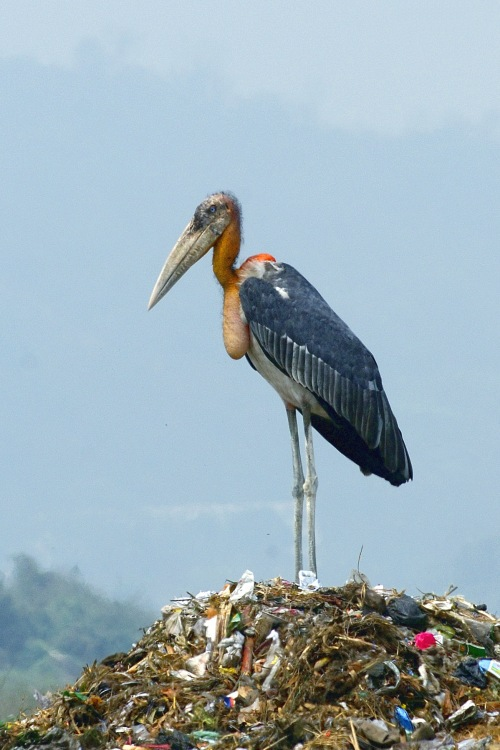
Greater adjutant

Barman is known for her work with the greater adjutant, a large stork listed as endangered by the IUCN red list. It has a global population of 800–1,200 mature individuals, with the majority of these individuals (650–800) found in Assam India. In Assam this bird lives in close contact with urban areas, nests in privately owned trees and scavenges at rubbish dumps. As a result, the greater adjutant is threatened by pollution, habitat loss, and felling of nesting trees.

Barman began working with greater adjutants while conducting her PhD research in the remote villages of Dadara, Pacharia and Singimari in the Kamrup district of Assam. In 2007, she witnessed a tree owner cutting down a tree containing a greater adjutant nest with nestlings inside. This led Barman to discover that this bird had a bad reputation among the villagers due to its unattractive appearance, scavenging nature and foul-smelling nests. Barman then decided to postpone her PhD in order to focus on educating local communities about the ecological importance of the greater adjutant.

Barman led a number of conservation campaigns that integrated the culture and traditions of the local villagers. These included presenting conservation messages during religious functions, cooking competitions, street plays and community dances. Other education techniques included involving film celebrities to spread conservation awareness, and throwing celebrations for owners of nesting trees used by the greater adjutant. Education campaigns were also directed at children and young adults, using games and activities to educate them on the ecological importance of the greater adjutant. A scholarship was also developed for children of nesting tree owners. Barman also gathered support from Kamrup district government by inviting government officials to visit greater adjutant habitats and by engaging local forestry and police departments to directly participate in conservation actions.

== Hargila Army ==
Barman is also the founder of the Hargila Army, an all female grassroots conservation group named after the local name of the greater adjutant. This name comes from the Sanskrit word for "bone swallower." This group has over 20,000 members including 400 local Assamese volunteers. Their goal is to remove all obstacles that prevent greater adjutant conservation. This movement has been credited with empowering marginalized women and giving them a voice in local conservation issues.

Barman and the Hargila Army also actively rescue and rehabilitate injured greater adjutant nestlings. Villagers place nets around nesting trees to catch nestlings if they fall out of trees on windy days (especially during monsoons), and injured nestlings are given medical treatment, rehabilitated at a local zoo then released by the community. Barman has also developed an artificial breeding platform for the greater adjutant, which was successfully used to hatch a nestling in 2019.

Since the onset of Barman's conservation efforts, local greater adjutant populations have increased. When conservation efforts began in 2007 only 28 nests were found in the Kamrup district colony, but as of 2019 there were 200 nests making this greater adjutant colony the largest in the world.

Barman is also credited with integrating greater adjutant conservation into the culture of rural Assamese villages. Following Barman' conservation efforts, villagers of the Kamrup district have become actively involved in greater adjutant conservation and as of 2010, no nesting trees have been cut down. Efforts to change the image of the birds from bad omens or pests into one worthy of representation in celebrated human traditions like marriage and childbirth. The greater adjutant has been incorporated into local folk songs, traditions and cultural festivals. For example, villagers give expecting greater adjutants a baby shower or Panchamrit ceremony, using the same rituals done for expecting Assamese women, and Greater Adjutant Day is celebrated every year on 2 February. Women of the Hargila Army also weave images of the greater adjutant into their fabrics, spreading awareness about conservation while generating income for their families. Another outreach initiative is based around educating elementary-age children in the schools through discussions and games, as well as field trips to the landfills where the scavenger birds can often be found. Journalist Abdul Gani won Laadli Media & Advertising Award (2015–16) for his reporting on Greater Adjutant Stork conservation efforts by Purnima Devi Barman and her team.

== Awards and honours ==
Barman was the recipient of the 2017 Nari Shakti Puraskar (the highest civilian award for Indian women) presented by the President of India, Ram Nath Kovind. Also in 2017, a Whitley Award (also known as a Green Oscar) was presented to her by Anne, Princess Royal of the United Kingdom. In addition, Barman has received the Leadership Award 2015 from the Conservation Leadership Programme (CLP), the Future conservationist award 2009, UNDP India Biodiversity Award 2016 from the United Nations, Royal Bank of Scotland RBS "Earth Hero Award" 2016, Bharat Sanchar Roll of Honour 2017 from BSNL in 2017, Balipara Foundation "Green Guru Award" in 2016, and the FIICI FLO Women Achiever Award from North East in 2017. Barman has been honoured with the UN Environment Programme's (UNEP) 2022 Champions of the Earth award in the Entrepreneurial Vision category. In 2024, she won the GBP £100,000 Whitley Gold Award from the Whitley Fund for Nature (WFN), which supports grassroots conservation leaders from around the world. She was named one of Time's Women of the Year and also listed in the Asian Scientist 100 in 2025.

== Selected works ==
- Barman, P.D., A.K Das, B.K Das, S. Biswas. 2011. Conservation Initiatives for Greater Adjutant in Assam, India. Final Report, CLP project ID 331509. Aaranyak.
- Barman, P.D., M. Barthakur, A.K. Das, J. Das. 2014. Greater Adjutant conservation through community participation in Assam, India. Final Report, CLP Project ID F03110012. Aaranyak.
- Barman, P.D., and D.K Sharma. 2015. Largest breeding colony of Greater Adjutant, Leptoptilos dubius Gmelin, in Dadara-Pasariya-Singimari Villages in Assam, India. Zoo's Print. 30(11): 5–6.
- Barman, P.D., S. Ali, P. Deori, D.K. Sharma. 2015. Rescue, Treatment and Release of an Endangered Greater Adjutant Leptoptilos dubius. Zoo's Print. 30(9): 6–9.
- Barman, P.D., and D.K. Sharma. 2020. Foraging analysis of Endangered Greater Adsjutant Stork Leptotilus dubios (Gemlin) in certain habitat of Assam, India. Cold Stream Harbor Laboratory.
