= George Schwab =

George Schwab may refer to:

- George D. Schwab (born 1931), American political scientist
- George W. Schwab (1876–1955), Presbyterian missionary to Cameroon and anthropologist
