= Short-tailed roundleaf bat =

Conservation status
- Endangered (IUCN 3.1)

Scientific classification
- Kingdom: Animalia
- Phylum: Chordata
- Class: Mammalia
- Order: Chiroptera
- Family: Hipposideridae
- Genus: Hipposideros
- Species: H. curtus

Binomial name
- Hipposideros curtus G.M. Allen, 1921
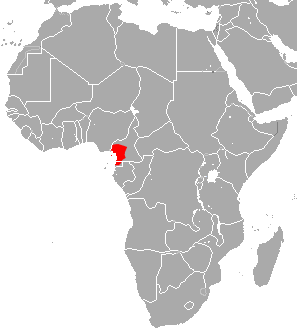
- Short-tailed roundleaf bat range

Species of bat

The short-tailed roundleaf bat (Hipposideros curtus) is a species of bat in the family Hipposideridae. It is found in Cameroon and Equatorial Guinea. Its natural habitats are subtropical or tropical moist lowland forests and caves. It is threatened by habitat loss.

== Taxonomy ==
It was described as a new species in 1921 by American mammalogist Glover Morrill Allen. The holotype had been collected in 1920 by Reverend George W. Schwab in Sackbayeme, Cameroon. Its species name "curtus" is Latin for "short". Morrill noted that it could be distinguished from other closely related bats by its very short tail.

As the bat genus Hipposideros is very speciose, it is traditionally subdivided into species groups. The short-tailed roundleaf bat is within the bicolor species group.

== Description ==
Its forearm length ranges from 42–47 mm (1.7–1.9 in). Based on one individual, they weigh approximately 7.1 g (0.25 oz).

== Range and habitat ==
It has been confirmed in Cameroon and Equatorial Guinea; additionally, its range may include Nigeria. It has been documented at a range of elevations from 0–500 m (0–1,640 ft) above sea level. Its habitat is lowland tropical forest.

In 2016 a population of the species was discovered near to the Afi Mountain Wildlife Sanctuary in southern Nigeria by the ecologist Iroro Tanshi, who worked with local people to conserve the population.

== Conservation ==
It is listed as endangered by the IUCN. It meets the criteria for this designation because its suitable caves are probably confined to an area less than 2,000 km^{2} (770 mi^{2}); its habitat is fragmented; and its habitat is declining in quality in extent.
