= Olivier Nsengimana =

Rwandan veterinarian and conservationist

- Born: 1984 (age 41–42); Southern Province, Rwanda
- Education: University of Rwanda, University of Edinburgh
- Occupations: Veterinarian, conservationist
- Known for: Protecting the grey crowned crane

Olivier Nsegimana (born 1984) is a Rwandan veterinarian and animal conservationist best known for his work heading the Rwanda Wildlife Conservation Association, which he founded in 2015. His conservation work on the grey crowned crane is credited with helping to save the species. He was awarded a Rolex Award for Enterprise, a Whitley Award, and a Whitley Gold Award, and was named to the Time 100 Next in 2026.

== Biography ==
Nsengimana was born in Rwanda's southern province in 1984, and was the oldest child of his family. He frequently encountered grey crowned cranes when fetching water. He initially intended to study medicine in university as the country was healing from the Rwandan genocide, but ultimately shifted his path into veterinary studies, graduating at the top of his class from the University of Rwanda with a dean's award. He worked as a field veterinarian for Gorilla Doctors, and went on to receive a master's degree in conservation science from the University of Edinburgh, graduating in 2015.

He was awarded a Rolex Award for Enterprise in 2014, which helped him as he decided to create his own organization, the Rwanda Wildlife Conservation Association. They focused on protecting the grey crowned crane; by this point, only three hundred lived in the wild but many others were kept in captivity. By 2016, he had begun utilizing efforts ranging from comic books seeking to recruit younger individuals to drone monitoring, media awareness, and work with the government, and as of that year had returned an additional 98 cranes to the wild.

He continued his awareness campaign, and had the government issue a national amnesty on ownership of grey crowned cranes to encourage people to come forward about their cranes. Thousands of people came forward: the healthy cranes were taken to Akagera National Park, while the cranes that would not be able to survive in the wild were moved to Umusambi Village, a bird sanctuary. He built a team of 270 people in Rwanda, and also collaborated with organizations in Uganda, Burundi, and Tanzania. As of 2025, the wild crane population, at his group's last count, was upwards of 1200.

He has also worked on conservation more generally: under his leadership, the Rwanda Wildlife Conservation Association has helped people whose work did harm to marshes to find new jobs that don't harm the environment. The group has focused particularly on Rugezi Marsh, a key habitat for the cranes. He also works to stop illegal poaching, in particular of cranes.

He was a finalist for the Tusk Conservation Awards in 2016. He was awarded the Future For Nature Award in 2019. He was named an Ashoka Changemakers Fellow in 2023. He was awarded a Whitley Award in 2018, and received the 2025 Whitley Gold Award from Anne, Princess Royal. He was named to the Time 100 Next in 2026, where his article was written by Elizabeth Wathuti.
