= Zena Tooze =

Canadian conservationist

Zena Tooze (born 3 May 1955) is a Canadian biologist and conservationist who has worked in Nigeria in the area of primate conservation since 1991. She received a master's degree in Biology from Dalhousie University, Halifax, Nova Scotia in 1987. In 2005 she received a Whitley Award for excellence in leadership in nature conservation.

== CERCOPAN ==
In 1994 Tooze founded the Centre for Education, Research and Conservation of Primates and Nature (CERCOPAN) which is a non-profit, non-government organisation based in Cross River State, Nigeria. CERCOPAN is a rehabilitation and conservation project for threatened and endangered forest monkeys. Much of its work involves the rehabilitation of young monkeys orphaned by the trade in bushmeat. The mission of CERCOPAN is to conserve Nigeria's primates through sustainable rainforest conservation, community partnerships, education, primate rehabilitation and research.

The host community of CERCOPAN is Iko Esai which is involved in the collaborative protection of 200 km^{2} of forest contiguous with the Cross River National Park. At least six species of monkey are involved in the rehabilitation and conservation program, including the endemic Sclater's guenon, Preuss's guenon and red-eared guenon. Following acting as CERCOPAN's Director since 1995, Tooze handed over to a new Director in January 2009, from which time she took on the official title of 'Founder and Trustee', heading up the board of trustees for the UK registered charity which she founded to support the conservation work in Nigeria (registered charity 1116955).
