= Nature Conservation Foundation =

Organisation based in Mysore, India

- Formation: 1996
- Headquarters: Mysore, India
- Executive Board: Suhel Quader, Vena Kapoor, M Ananda Kumar, Smita Prabhakar, Ajay Bijoor, Janhavi Rajan, Rucha Karkarey, Rohit Naniwadekar
- Website: http://www.ncf-india.org/

The Nature Conservation Foundation is a non-governmental wildlife conservation and research organisation based in Mysore, India. They promote the use of science for wildlife conservation in India.

== History ==
The Nature Conservation Foundation was founded in 1996. Their mission is to carry out "science-based and socially responsible conservation".

== Activities and Projects ==
The organisation works in a variety of habitats. The high altitude program focuses on human wildlife conflicts and conservation of endangered species such as the snow leopard and the Tibetan gazelle. A livestock insurance program has been launched to prevent retaliatory killings of snow leopards by communities whose livestock were being preyed on. The organisation has partnered with the International Snow Leopard Trust and the Government of India to launch a Project Snow Leopard, similar to Project Tiger for the protection of the wildlife in the Himalayan landscapes. The Project Snow Leopard seeks to address the problem of species declines in the high-altitude Himalayan landscape through evidence-based conservation plans as well as local support. Species such as snow leopard, Asiatic ibex, argali, urial, chiru, takin, serow and musk deer will particularly benefit from this project. In 2003, three wildlife biologists from the foundation reported the Chinese goral (Nemorhaedus caudatus) from Arunachal Pradesh, the first record for India In 2005, scientists from the foundation described the Arunachal macaque from western Arunachal Pradesh, India, a species new to science. The organisation runs a rainforest restoration program in the Anamalai hills in the Western Ghats where fragments of degraded patches of rainforests outside national parks or wildlife sanctuaries are restored in partnership with the private tea and coffee plantations.

== Awards ==
Charudutt Mishra and M. D. Madhusudhan, two of the founders received the Whitley award, also called "Green Oscar" for 2005 and 2009 respectively. Charudutt Mishra was awarded for the conservation efforts in the high altitude landscapes, while Madhusudan was conferred the honor in recognition of his work to reduce human-wildlife conflict in the Western Ghats.

In 2006, the organisation won the Distinguished service award from the Society for Conservation Biology. for outstanding contributions to nature conservation. Sushil Dorje, a field coordinator with the organisation was awarded the Van Tienhoven Foundation award for his work on human-wildlife conflict in Spiti and Ladakh.

In 2013, Aparajita Datta was awarded the Whitley award to continue her decade long work on conservation of hornbills. Aparajita Dutta, a Senior Scientist at NCF was announced as the recipient of 2009 Woman of Discovery Humanity Award by the New York-based Wings World Quest for a lifetime dedicated to wildlife biology and her work in Namdapha Tiger Reserve. She was also awarded by the National Geographic Society as an Emerging explorer for 2010, which recognized "..14 trailblazers from around the world".

In 2015, Dr. Ananda Kumar was awarded the Whitley award for his work on elephant-human conflict management on the Valparai plateau. In 2017, he was awarded a continuation of funding.
