= Alexander Arbachakov =

Russian conservationist

Alexander Arbachakov (Russian: Александр Арбачаков) is a member of the Shor tribe of Siberia and has worked for over 15 years to protect the cedar forest surrounding the home of his tribe in the Kemerovo Oblast of Russia. As of 2006, Arbachakov was working with local peoples and the government of the region to map Shor territories and prioritize areas most valuable to both people and wildlife. In pursuit of this endeavor, Arbachakov is documenting Shor traditional knowledge to help show other communities how they can use the forests without harming biodiversity. He currently works as the Director of Agency for the Research and Protection of the Taiga in Mezhdurechensk, Kemerovo Oblast.

On May 11, 2006 Arbachakov was presented with a Whitley Award, UK’s top conservation award from The Princess Royal by London’s Royal Geographical Society.

== Writings ==
- The Last of the Shor Shamans, Moon Books, 2008 (with Luba Arbachakov)
- Shor Shamanic Epic Folktales, Moon Books, 2019 (with Luba Arbachakov)
