= International School of Lusaka =

Coordinates: 15.4051°S 28.3143°E

- Lusaka; Zambia

Information
- Type: Private
- Motto: Learning Today, Leading Tomorrow
- Opened: 1963
- Head of school: Dr. Liam Hammer
- Grades: K - 12
- Enrollment: 700
- Campus: 1
- Colors: Blue, Green and White
- Website: www.isl.sch.zm

International School of Lusaka (ISL) is an international school in Ridgeway, Lusaka, Zambia. It is equivalent to an American PK-12 school, and it serves levels preschool through IGCSE/IB Diploma/ISL diploma courses (K-13).

As of 2024, the school has 700 students from 60 countries.

The school was established in 1963 and is the oldest international school in Zambia.

== Programmes ==
=== Early years programme ===
The philosophy of the Early Years Programme is to support students to develop self-awareness and to become confident and independent. ISL early years programme covers nursery, pre-school, reception and Year 1 and 2 levels.

=== Primary school programme ===
The aim of the Primary Years Programme (PYP) is to produce students who are Inquirers, Thinkers, Knowledgeable, Caring and Open-minded. This programme covers Year 3,4,5 and 6.

=== Middle school programme ===
Middle School is a time of transition in a child's life where a variety of subjects and activities prepare them to move forward with self-reliance. ISL middle school uses the International Middle Years Curriculum (IMYC). The International Middle Years Curriculum is a concept-focused and internationally inclined curriculum which is rigorous, challenging and engaging and is designed to address the unique learning needs of children aged from 11 to 14 years. With the IMYC, ISL students study thematic units which help them to connect their learning experiences across subjects, make meaning of their learning and develop international mindedness.

=== High school programme ===
High School at ISL offers a range of programmes to prepare students for life beyond school, including the International Baccalaureate Diploma. The ISL High School programme is a 4-year university preparatory curriculum that aims to develop the habits of mind necessary for creative and critical thinking, collaborative and independent coursework and effective communication. Through Years 10 and 11, students follow the IGCSE programme, and through Years 12 and 13, students follow the IB Diploma Programme.

== Affiliations ==
International School of Lusaka is affiliated with the following institutions:

- International Baccalaureate (IB).
- International General Certificate of Secondary Education (IGCSE).
- International Middle Years Curriculum (IMYC).
- Council of International Schools (CIS).
- New England Association of Schools and Colleges (NEASC).
- Association of International Schools in Africa (AISA).
- Independent Schools Association in Zambia (ISAZ).
