= Edward Whitley (environmentalist) =

British wildlife conservationist, philanthropist, author, and financier

Edward Whitley OBE is a British wildlife conservationist, author, philanthropist and financier. He founded the Whitley Fund for Nature.

== Early life ==
Edward Whitley studied English at Oxford University (where he won a Blue at Modern Pentathlon) before joining N. M. Rothschild & Sons in 1983. In 1990 he left banking to work full time as a writer.

== Career ==
His books include The Graduates, a collection of interviews with notable public figures, including the last interviews with Sir John Betjeman and Indira Gandhi, which was selected as Book of the Year by Private Eye, and Rogue Trader, an autobiography of derivatives trader, Nick Leeson, whose fraudulent trades caused the collapse of Barings Bank. His book Gerald Durrell's Army, about the conservationists working with the naturalist Gerald Durrell, inspired him to create the Whitley Fund for Nature in 1993.

The Whitley Fund for Nature, which accelerates the work of grassroots conservationists around the world, is famous for its Whitley Awards (often referred to as The Green Oscars), and over 30 years has channelled more than £34 million to 220 environmentalists in 80 countries. Anne, Princess Royal is a patron and Sir David Attenborough has been a long-term supporter, as trustee and ambassador. In 2013 Edward was awarded an OBE for services to wildlife conservation.

Edward Whitley set up Whitley Asset Management, a wealth management firm, in 2002, which in October 2024 was sold to Schroder & Co and merged with Cazenove Capital. His latest book Jane Austen and George Eliot: The Lady and the Radical was published by Biteback Publishing in March 2025.

== Accolades ==
Edward Whitley was appointed Officer of the Order of the British Empire (OBE) in the 2013 Birthday Honours for services to wildlife conservation.

== Bibliography ==
- The Graduates, Hamish Hamilton, 1986. ISBN 0241117887
- Gerald Durrell’s Army, John Murray, 1992. ISBN 0719549493
- Rogue Trader, co-authored with Nick Leeson, published by Little Brown, 1996 ISBN 0316879711
- Jane Austen & George Eliot: The Lady & The Radical, published by Biteback Publishing, 2025. ISBN 9781785909986.
