= Dadara, Kamrup =

Dadara
- town
- Location in Kamrup, India Dadara (India)
- Coordinates: 26.21°N 91.63°E
- Country: India
- State: Assam
- District: Kamrup
- Elevation: 46 m (151 ft)

Languages
  - Native: Kamrupi
- Time zone: UTC+5:30 (IST)
- PIN: 781104
- ISO 3166 code: IN-AS
- Vehicle registration: AS

Dadara is a town in Kamrup district of Assam, situated on the north bank of the Brahmaputra River.

== Education ==
Dadara Balika Primary school, Dadara Balika Vidyapeeth, Dadara Gopalthan Primary school, Dadara Higher Secondary school, Dadara Junior Basic school, Ramsaraswati Academy, Sankardev Sishu Vidya Niketan and Pub Bongshor college are some of the educational institutes located here.

== Transportation ==
Dadara is at National Highway 427 and is well connected to nearby towns with different modes of transport. It is 5.6 km from Amingaon, North Guwahati and 11.2 km from largest town Gauhati. The nearest railway stations are Amingaon, Agyathuri, Kamakhya and Guwahati. It is connected by air through Gauhati International Airport.

== See also ==
- Changsari
- Jorabat
