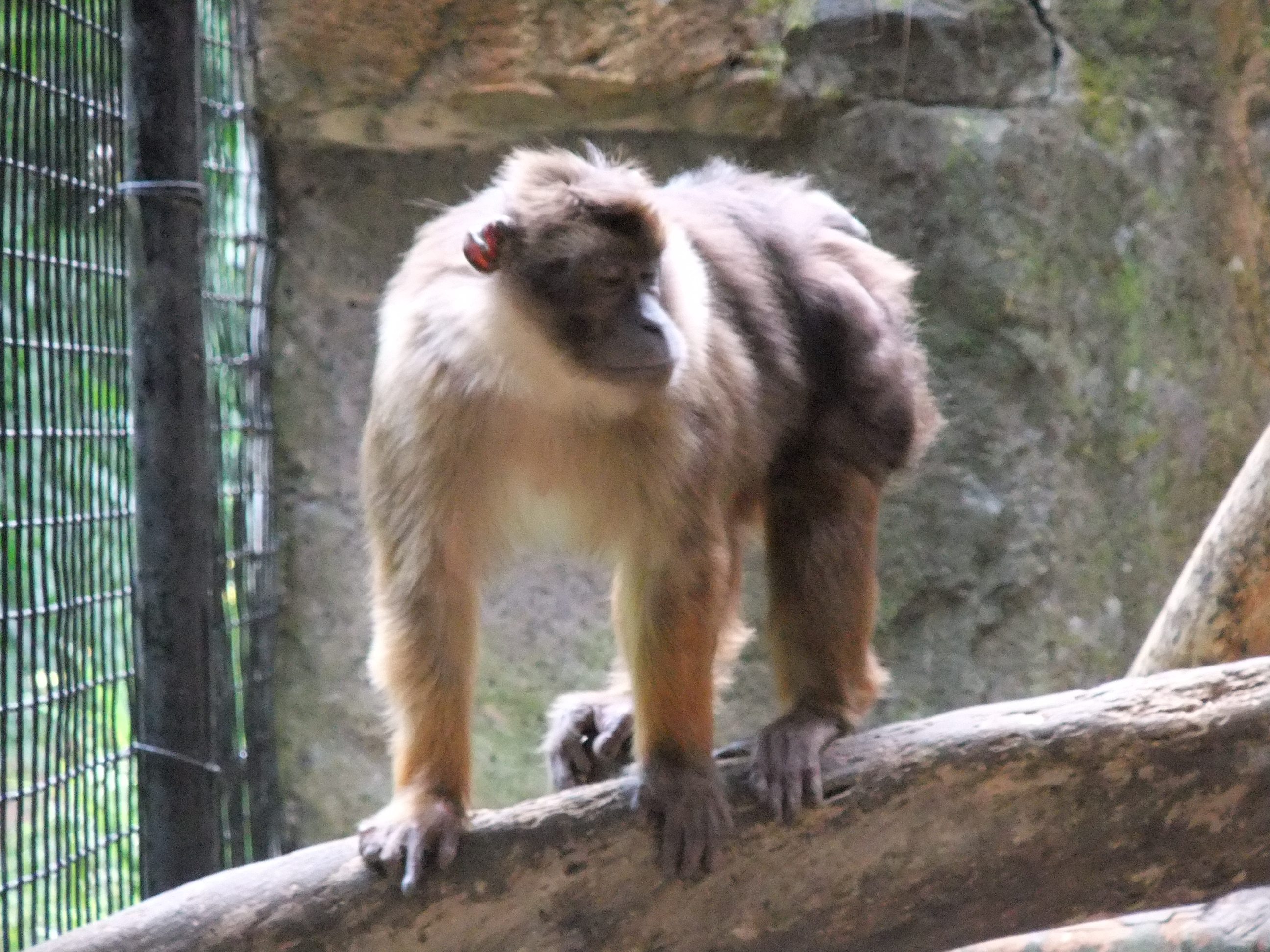
- Captive Pagai Island macaque, Cisarua, West Java, Indonesia

Conservation status
- Critically Endangered (IUCN 3.1)

Scientific classification
- Kingdom: Animalia
- Phylum: Chordata
- Class: Mammalia
- Order: Primates
- Suborder: Haplorhini
- Family: Cercopithecidae
- Genus: Macaca
- Species: M. pagensis

Binomial name
- Macaca pagensis (Miller, 1903)
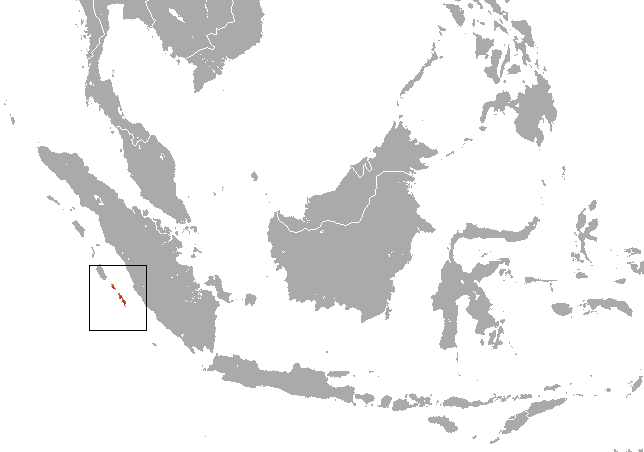
- Pagai Island macaque range

= Pagai Island macaque =

Species of Old World monkey

The Pagai Island macaque (Macaca pagensis), also known as the Pagai macaque or Bokkoi, is an Old World monkey endemic to the Mentawai Islands off the west coast of Sumatra. It is listed as critically endangered on the IUCN Red List due to its ever-shrinking habitat. Macaca pagensis formerly included the overall darker Siberut macaque as a subspecies, but this arrangement is polyphyletic, leading to the two being classified as separate species. Both were formerly considered subspecies of the southern pig-tailed macaque.

== Description ==
Pagai Island macaque males are generally larger than females. The males' body lengths range from 45–55 cm (18–22 in) and females' body lengths are around 40–45 cm (16–18 in). Tail length is 13–16 cm (5.1–6.3 in) for males and 10–13 cm (3.9–5.1 in) for females. Males are also heavier, weighing around 6–9 kg (13–20 lb) while females weigh 4.5–6 kg (9.9–13.2 lb). Their backs have a dark brown coloration, and chestnut to pale ochre on the sides of the neck, the front of the shoulders and the undersides of this species. Legs are brown and their arms, reddish brown. The faces of Mentawai macaques are furless and black-skinned with brown eyes. They have cheek pouches to carry food while foraging.

== Habitat and ecology ==
The macaques' natural habitat is rainforest, but they can also be found in riverine and coastal swamp-forests. They live high above the forest floor in the canopy, forage between 24 and 36 metres (79 and 118 ft) and may sleep as high as 45 metres (148 ft). The primary food of the species is figs. They may split into splinter groups to forage for food and to sleep. They will eat alongside groups of Mentawai langurs. M. pagensis groups consist of around 5 to 25 individuals. Typically, a group consists of a single male with adult females and their offspring. The male decides where to go and communicates this to the rest of the group with high-pitched cries. Roaming, solitary Pagai Island macaques may challenge the dominant male for his position, leading to aggressive fights. The natural predators of the species are the crested serpent eagle and the reticulated python. When these predators are spotted, the macaques will alert the rest of the group with a short, gruff bark.

== Reproduction ==
Females show fertility and willingness to mate by displaying their swollen and reddened genitals. Females crouch to initiate mating. The gestation period is between five and six months. A single offspring is born during the night. The mother eats the placenta and licks the infant clean before morning. The mother and young share a close bond into adulthood.

== Population and threats ==
The species' primary habitat is on the Mentawai Islands 150 km (93 mi) off the west coast of Sumatra. They populate three of the four major islands in the chain (North Pagai, South Pagai and Sipura). Due to deforestation by immigrants from the Indonesian mainland, the species is now listed as critically endangered on the IUCN red list. The primary reasons behind deforestation on the island are the clearing of large areas of land for cash crop and oil palm plantations, as well as commercial logging. As a result, the water levels in the forest rivers fluctuate to a much greater degree than before. The alternating flooding and low water levels has also caused an increase in the population of malarial mosquitoes.
