= George W. Schwab =

Presbyterian minister and missionary

George W. Schwab (1876–1955) was a Presbyterian minister and a missionary. He and his wife Jewel Huester Schwab were appointed to the West Africa Mission in 1905. He also did scientific work in the fields of anthropology and zoology.

== Early life and education ==
George W. Schwab was born in 1876 in Clinton, Massachusetts. He graduated from Amherst College for both a Bachelor of Science and a Doctor of Science. He also had a Master of Arts from Harvard University, which he received in 1919.

== Career ==
=== Missionary ===
Schwab was a missionary in the West African country of Cameroon. His appointment began in 1905 when the Presbyterian Church of the USA designated him and his wife to its West Africa Mission. By 1922, he was the superintendent of the American Presbyterian Mission Schools. His career as a missionary ended in 1941.

=== Scientist ===
For more than thirty years, Schwab was affiliated with the Peabody Museum of Archaeology and Ethnology of Harvard University, becoming an Honorary Research Fellow for West Africa. Shortly after officially becoming affiliated with the Peabody Museum in 1918, he collaborated with Earnest Hooton to create a linguistic and tribal map of Africa on behalf of the U.S. Peace Commission. In 1922, he held the Hemenway Fellowship from the Peabody Museum. In 1924, he was appointed a Research Associate in Anthropology for Liberian Ethnology for the Peabody Museum, a position he held until his retirement in 1949.

Schwab collected the holotype of the short-tailed roundleaf bat (Hipposideros curtus) in 1920. He also collected the holotype of a species of rove beetle, Dorylophila schwabi, which was named after him by William Morton Wheeler. Glover Morrill Allen attempted to name a species of dormouse after Schwab, Graphiurus schwabi, but it was determined to be a junior synonym to an existing scientific name, Graphiurus surdus. Additionally, Schwab is presumed the collector of the holotype of a species of fungus of the genus Autophagomyces, A. kamerunensis.

Schwab published two works about his time in Cameroon:

- The Tribes of the Liberian Hinterland
- Field Notes on the Basa Tribe of the Cameroons

== Personal life ==
Schwab was married to Jewel Huester Schwab.

== Later life and death ==
Schwab died on 3 October 1955 in Orlando, Florida at the age of 79.
