= Mysore Doreswamy Madhusudan =

Indian biologist

M D Madhusudan ಮೈಸೂರು ದೊರೆಸ್ವಾಮಿ ಮಧುಸೂದನ
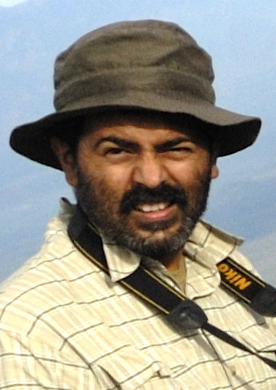
- M. D. Madhusudan, in 2009.
- Born: Mysore
- Education: Yuvaraja College, Mysore
- Known for: Human-wildlife conflict, discovery of Arunachal macaque
- Awards: Whitley Award
- Scientific career
- Fields: Wildlife Conservation, Conservation Biology, Ecology
- Workplaces: Nature Conservation Foundation
- Doctoral advisor: Anindya Sinha

Mysore Doreswamy Madhusudan (Kannada: ಮೈಸೂರು ದೊರೆಸ್ವಾಮಿ ಮಧುಸೂದನ) is an Indian wildlife biologist and ecologist. He is the co-founder of Nature Conservation Foundation, Mysore. He has worked on understanding and mitigating the effects of human-wildlife conflict in the Nilgiri Biosphere Reserve in South India. He has also worked in several other forests in the Himalayas and North-east India. In 2004, he was one among the team of wildlife biologists who described Arunachal macaque, a new species of macaque from Arunachal Pradesh, India.

== Early life and work ==
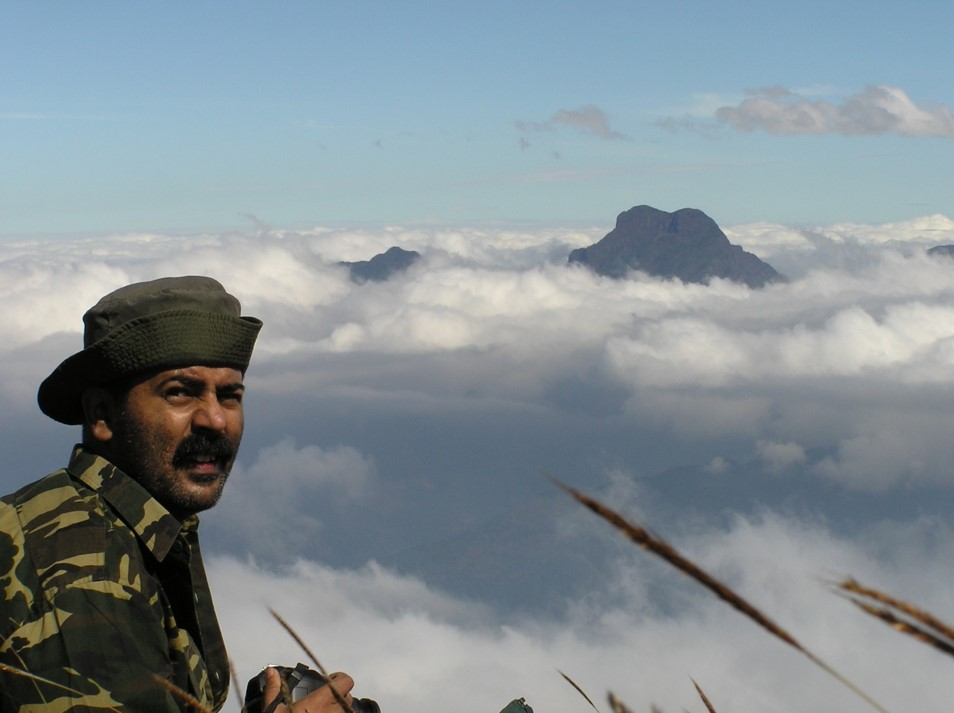
Madhusudan in the Nilgiris

After obtaining a basic science degree from Yuvaraja's College, Mysore, Madhusudan did his post-graduation in wildlife biology from the Wildlife Institute of India, Dehradun. He worked on resource use in and around forests and its impact on large mammal conservation for his PhD thesis under the guidance of Anindya Sinha. He uncovered the links between coffee production in Brazil and patterns of cattle grazing and ownership in and around the forests of Bandipur. He found that the global fall in coffee prices resulted in an increased demand for cow dung used as manure in coffee estates in several areas in the Nilgiris and Western Ghats resulting in a large-scale export of dung transforming it from a locally produced and locally consumed manure for village agriculture to a high-value organic fertilizer for commercial export to coffee plantations. Following the dung export, livestock numbers in the region increased, aggravating grazing pressures on the forests. This work challenged the prevalent notion that resource use for subsistence is distinguishable from and preferable to commercial resource use in the context of protected-area management in India.

== Awards ==
Madhusudan was conferred the Whitley Award, popularly called Green Oscar in May 2009 in recognition of his work to reduce human-wildlife conflict in the Western Ghats. Madhusudan and NCF have said the grant from the award of £30,000, donated by HSBC, will go towards conservation activities, primarily for crop protection, in the Nilgiri Biosphere Reserve. He was chosen as a TED Fellow in 2009. He was the first recipient of the Obaid Siddiqi Chair in the History and Culture of Science at the Archives of NCBS, a public centre for the history of contemporary biology in India.

== Bibliography ==
- Madhusudan, M. D. & Mishra, C. (2003) Why big, fierce animals are threatened: conserving large mammals in densely populated landscapes. Battles over nature: science and the politics of conservation (eds V. Saberwal & M. Rangarajan), pp. 31–55.Permanent Black, New Delhi.
- Madhusudan, M. D. & Karanth, K. U. (2000) Hunting for an answer: is local hunting compatible with large mammal conservation in India? Hunting for sustainability in tropical forests (eds J. G. Robinson & E. L. Bennett), pp. 339–355.Columbia University Press, New York.
- Karanth, K. U. & Madhusudan, M. D. (2002) Mitigating human-wildlife conflicts in southern Asia. Making parks work (eds J. Terborgh, C. V. Schaik, L. Davenport & M. Rao), pp. 250–264. Island Press, Washington D.C.
- Madhusudan, M. D. & Karanth, K. U. (2005) Local hunting and large mammal conservation. Wildlife conservation, research and management (eds Y. V. Jhala, R. Chellam & Q. Qureshi), pp. 60–67.Wildlife Institute of India, Dehradun.
- Johnsingh, A. J. T. & Madhusudan, M. D. (2009) Tiger reintroduction in India: conservation tool or costly dream? Reintroduction of top-order predators (eds M. W. Hayward & M. J. Somers), pp. 146–163. Wiley-Blackwell, Chichester, UK.
