= Zafer Kızılkaya =

Turkish marine advocate and engineer

Zafer Ali Kızılkaya (born 1969) is a Turkish marine advocate and engineer who is credited for expanding marine protected areas (MPAs) along Turkey's Mediterranean coast.

Kızılkaya was born in Ankara in 1969. Growing up, he watched Jacques Cousteau documentaries which inspired his admiration for the sea. He has a bachelor's degree in civil engineering from Middle East Technical University. After graduating from college, Kızılkaya took interest in commercial deep sea diving and underwater photography. He took his interests to the Pacific Ocean and spent many years exploring its waters while being a marine photographer and researcher in Indonesia. He went on to receive a master's degree in Coastal and Harbor engineering from Middle East Technical University.

Kızılkaya's efforts to advocate and protect Turkey's coast stemmed from Turkey's marine ecosystem being under serious threat and facing a lot of damage due to several different factors like Climate change, illegal fishing, as well as overfishing and an increase in tourism. The Mediterranean sea is known to be the most over fished sea in the world. Kızılkaya had hopes to transform Turkey's ravaged marine regions into more effective and developing conservation areas.

Kızılkaya was awarded the Goldman Environmental Prize in 2023, given annually to six environmentalists who work in different continents. Kızılkaya is the first Turkish recipient of the prize.

Currently, he is the president and co-founder of an NGO named "Akdeniz Koruma Dernegi" ("Mediterranean Conservation Society" in Turkish). This NGO focuses on protecting and restoring the marine ecosystems on the Mediterranean coast of Turkey.
