= Whitley Awards (UK) =

British environmental award

- Description: Recognition of grassroots conservation leaders in the Global South
- Country: United Kingdom (International focus)
- Presented by: Whitley Fund for Nature (WFN)
- Reward: £40,000 in project funding

The Whitley Awards are held annually by the Whitley Fund for Nature (WFN) to recognise and celebrate effective grassroots conservation leaders across the Global South. The charity's flagship conservation prizes, worth £40,000 in project funding over one year, are won competitively following assessment by an expert academic panel and are now amongst the most high profile of conservation prizes. Often referred to by others as "Green Oscars", the Awards seek to recognise outstanding contributions to wildlife conservation with a focus on Asia, Africa and Latin America, bringing international attention to the work of deserving individuals committed to precipitating long-lasting conservation benefits on the ground, with the support of local communities. In addition to the funding aspect of the Whitley Awards, WFN also provides media and speech training to enable winners to effectively communicate their work and inspire further philanthropic support.

The Awards involve a process of reference, application and interview. The Whitley Awards Ceremony, hosted by the patron of WFN, the Princess Royal, is held annually at the Royal Geographical Society, usually in the Spring.

Established in 1994 by Edward Whitley, WFN has given £26 million to support the work of 200 local environmental heroes benefiting wildlife and communities in more than 80 countries across the Global South.

WFN seeks to:

- Find and fund effective local conservationists from biodiversity-rich, resource-poor countries spearheading work to deliver lasting impact on the ground.
- Support the scale-up of successful projects based on science and community involvement.
- Boost the national and international profile of winners and encourage action to address the serious challenges facing biodiversity worldwide.

== Continuation funding ==
WFN provides further funding to the most successful Whitley Award winners to take their projects to the next level and bring about lasting change for endangered species and their habitats. Applications are only open to previous Whitley Award winners who can apply for grants competitively each year. 55% of all previous Whitley Award winners have gone on to win Continuation Funding. Proposals are assessed by a panel of expert reviewers from a range of conservation and science organisations who identify the most compelling projects. Such funding is given to some of the most influential conservationists in their field, contributing measurable impact whether at the grassroots or now at national level.

== Whitley Gold Award ==
Each year, beginning in 2012, a previous Whitley Award winner has been selected to receive the Whitley Gold Award in recognition of their outstanding contribution to conservation. The Gold Award winners are international advocates for biodiversity with the passion and ambition to spread conservation messages to a wider audience. The Award is worth £60,000 in project funding for up to two years. Gold winners also join the Whitley Awards Judging Panel and act as a mentor to new winners during the Awards week.

== Selected winners ==
More than 200 conservationists from over 80 countries in Asia, Africa, or Latin America have received a Whitley Award for their work to protect wildlife, habitats, and communities.

Past winners include:

- Amanda Vincent (1994)
- Raman Sukumar (2003)
- Randall Arauz (2004)
- Ka Hsaw Wa (2004)
- Zena Tooze (2005)
- Romulus Whitaker (2005)
- Sandra Bessudo (2007)
- Alexander Arbachakov (2006)
- Gladys Kalema-Zikusoka (2009)
- Mysore Doreswamy Madhusudan (2009)
- Rodrigo Medellin, Whitley Gold Award (2012)
- Aparajita Datta (2013)
- Çağan Şekercioğlu, Whitley Gold Award (2013)
- Jean Wiener, Whitley Gold Award (2014)
- Dino Martins, Whitley Gold Award (2015)
- Hotlin Ompusunggu, Whitley Gold Award (2016)
- Purnima Devi Barman (2017)
- Ximena Vélez Liendo (2017)
- Zafer Kizilkaya (2013; Whitley Gold Award, 2017)
- Dominique Bikaba (2018)
- Caesar Rahman (2018)
- Kerstin Forsberg (2018)
- Anjali Watson (2018)
- Oliver Nsengimana (2018)
- Munir Virani (2018)
- Pablo García Borboroglu, Whitley Gold Award (2018)
- Jon Paul Rodríguez, Whitley Gold Award (2019)
- Patrícia Medici, Whitley Gold Award (2020)
- Iroro Tanshi (2021)
- Nuklu Phom (2021)
- Paula Kahumbu, Whitley Gold Award (2021)
- Charudutt Mishra, Whitley Gold Award (2022)
- Shivani Bhalla, founder of the Ewaso Lions, Whitley Gold Award (2023)
- Purnima Barman, Whitley Gold Award (2024)
- Fernanda Abra (2024)
- Andrés Link (2025)
- Federico Kacoliris (2025)
- Yara M. Barros (2025)
- Rahayu Oktaviani (2025)
- Reshu Bashyal (2025)
- Nurzhafarina "Farina" Othman (2025)
- Olivier Nsengimana, Whitley Gold Award (2025)

== Patron and ambassadors ==
- Princess Anne – "WFN is a direct funding charity that really does minimise the bits in-between. The funding goes straight to the winners, who have a lasting impact on global, national and political levels."
- Kate Humble – "This is what the Whitley Awards are all about – recognising small-scale, effective grassroots leaders and helping them expand their work"
- Lord Robin Russell
- Alastair Fothergill
- Tom Heap

== Trustees ==
- Edward Whitley, OBE
- Sir David Attenborough, OM, CH, CVO, CBE - "The Whitley Fund for Nature is unique. It doesn’t put its own people on the ground but seeks out local leaders who are already succeeding. It puts its money where it really counts, where every penny counts"
- Catherine Faulks
- Ian Lazarus
- Francis Sullivan

== See also ==
- Whitley Awards (Australia)
- List of environmental awards
