= Future For Nature =

Netherlands conservation organisation

The Future For Nature Foundation, known as Future For Nature (FFN), is a Dutch ANBI which supports young conservationists.

It makes three annual awards of €50,000 to conservationists under the age of 35. Winners subsequently become part of the "FFN Family", a network of conservationists. As of 2026, 57 winners from 35 countries have been awarded a total of €2,850,000. The prizes are awarded at a ceremony held at the Royal Burgers' Zoo: in 2022 they were presented by Frans Timmermans, vice-president of the European Union, and Razan Al Mubarak, president of the International Union for Conservation of Nature.

Sponsors of the foundation include the Royal Burgers' Zoo.

== Notable winners ==
- Olivier Nsengimana
