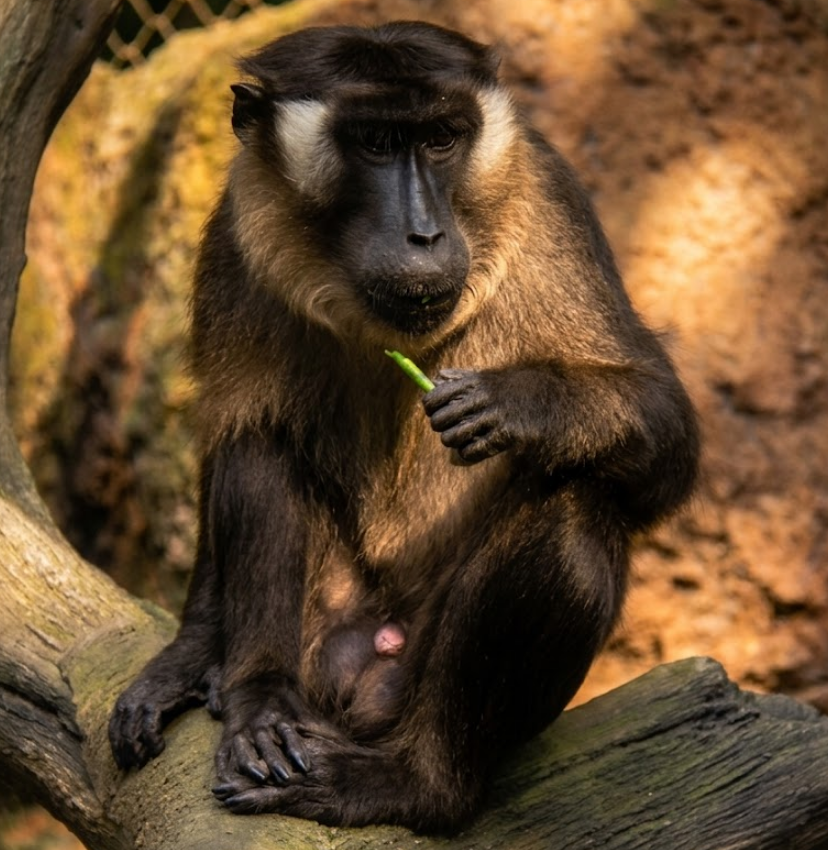

Conservation status
- Endangered (IUCN 3.1)

Scientific classification
- Kingdom: Animalia
- Phylum: Chordata
- Class: Mammalia
- Order: Primates
- Family: Cercopithecidae
- Genus: Macaca
- Species: M. siberu

Binomial name
- Macaca siberu Fuentes & Olson, 1995
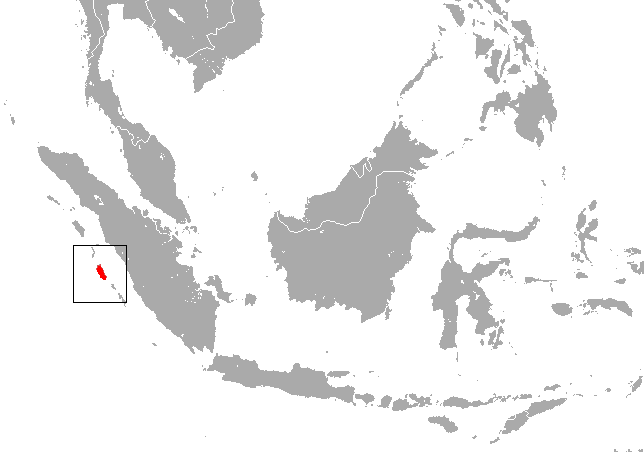
- Siberut Macaque range

= Siberut macaque =

Species of Old World monkey

The Siberut macaque (Macaca siberu) is a threatened primate species, belonging to the gregarious Old-World monkeys of the subfamily Cercopithecinae. M. siberu is endemic to Siberut Island of the Mentawai Islands in West Sumatra, Indonesia, which is encompassed in the biodiversity hotspot of Sundaland. The Siberut macaque was originally conspecific with the Pagai Island macaque (M. pagensis); however, later taxonomic review led the Siberut macaque to be classified as a new distinct species. The local Mentawai people still refer to both the Siberut macaque and the Pagai Island macaque as “Bokkoi”.

== Taxonomy ==
The Siberut macaque was originally described by Fuentes and Olson in 1995 as a subspecies of the former Mentawai macaque (Macaca pagensis), under the name Macaca pagensis siberu. This species also included the Pagai Island macaque as a subspecies under the name Macaca pagensis pagensis. In 2002, Andrew Kitchener and Colin Groves re-examined the available specimens and compared the Siberut macaque with other members of the Macaca nemestrina group. They found the Siberut macaque to be morphologically very distinct and concluded that it should be recognized as a separate species, which was named Macaca siberu. This decision also led the Pagai Island macaque to receive a species-level classification as Macaca pagensis.

== Description ==
Male Siberut macaques can have a body length of 47–48 cm, tails between 13–16 cm, and can weigh around 6–9 kg. Females of the same species tend to have a body length between 40–45 cm, tails between 10–13, and can weigh 4.5–6 kg. These patterns suggest a strong correlation for sexual size dimorphism, a trait that is prevalent among Asian primates. Siberut macaques can be identified by their white cheek pouches as well as their jet-black back, accompanied with a white to silvery-white underside. The ischial callosities, or “sitting pads,” of these macaques are light-colored and their tails are hairless except for the base. While they were once classified as the same species, Siberut macaques are can be differentiated from Pagai Island macaques based on M. siberu’s broader facial structure, lack of neck patches, shorter tail, and overall darker coloration.

== Habitat and Ecology ==
Siberut macaques are endemic to Siberut Island of the Mentawai Islands in West Sumatra, Indonesia. Individuals of this species principally inhabit tropical ever-wet rainforests, including primary dipterocarp forests, primary mixed forests, and peat swamp forests. Less commonly, individuals of this species have also been found inhabiting windthrown areas and canopy gaps. Generally, the habitats of Siberut macaques have high plant diversity but somewhat low tree species richness. The level of forest strata most favored by Siberut macaques remains unclear. Some observations have shown that the species prefers the middle portion of the forest, while other studies have described M. siberu as favoring the lower forest strata. Travel within their wide habitat range is mostly terrestrial, with 80% of the total travel time being on the forest floor. As semi-terrestrial primates, M. siberu is thus ecologically similar to their closest relative, M. nemestrina, occurring on the mainland.

Like all macaque groups, Siberut macaques live in social groups arranged around dominant matriarchs. Unlike some macaque species that live on nearby islands, Siberut macaques experience low predation risk due to the absence of major predators like felids and raptors in their habitat range. Their only predator species is the reticulated python (Python reticulatus), which does not hunt during the day.

== Diet and Feeding Behavior ==
Siberut macaques are predominantly frugivorous (75.5%), where foraging for arthropods, mushrooms, young leaves, pith, and flowers are used to supplement their diet when there is a low abundance of fruit or when searching for other patches among their home range. Pith consumption is facilitated by male individuals, wherein they break open palm trunks to feed, then also allowing female individuals to access this material as a food source. Their strong dependence on fruit may be possible because trees in peat swamp forests have been reported not to undergo masting, a phenomenon in which trees produce fruit synchronously. This may result in fruit being a continuously available food source in the Siberut macaque's habitat. The highly frugivorous diet demonstrated by these macaques may also correlate with the high annual rainfall and nutrient poor soil defining the habitat on Siberut. Although poorly documented, these factors could be caused by an increase in secondary compounds within tree leaves, resulting in a lower digestibility and decreased viability for leaves as a food resource. Still, juvenile Siberut macaques have been observed to eat leaves, as well as invertebrates.

Siberut macaques spend most of their time traveling to find food and thus less time socializing, something especially notable for M. siberu juveniles. The time allocation of traveling has been heavily associated with a more frugivorous diet, a factor found amongst other macaque species such as M. nemestrina, M. nigrescens, and M. tonkeana. Still, M. siberu travels more for feeding than any other macaque species, perhaps because of the lower diversity and abundance of fruit resources in their habitat compared with other forests in Malesia. For the Siberut macaque, the average size of feeding groups was observed to increase relative to the size of a food patch. Conversely, smaller food patches and larger feeding groups were associated with a greater likelihood of aggression. Despite this, the species’ overall aggression is low and feeding competition within a group is usually met by spreading out. Feeding groups of M. siberu spread further than other mainland Asian macaque species because their only predator is nocturnal, leading to a lack of predation risk in their habitat. This gap in predation pressure enables Siberut macaques to forgo forming alternative groups during foraging while also allowing juvenile macaques to forage on the outskirts of their group. Likewise, the species shows no alarm responses towards potential predators or a perceived danger from models of predators, reinforcing this fact.

== Habitat Loss ==
Although the Siberut macaque has no natural predators on Siberut, their numbers are in decline. Since their classification in 2008, the IUCN Red List re-evaluated their status from vulnerable to endangered in 2020. They cite this as a “non-genuine status change” due to new information surrounding current populations. Endemic populations of Siberut Macacques have experienced drastic declines. In 1980, the total population ranged from 39,000, but now there are as little as 17,000 individuals in the current day. Siberut macaques are known to be exposed by habitat loss and degradation from commercial logging, forest clearing, and non-sustainable agriculture. The population decline from habitat loss is continuously exacerbated by anthropogenic hunting and a growing local human population. Siberut macaques could benefit from conserving large forest areas, as larger habitats provide resting trees and fruit resources. However, with the elimination of these fruit-laden habitats, more human-wildlife conflicts are on the rise.

== Hunting ==
Historically, hunting among the Mentawai people cultivated a strong religious connection between them and the primates of Siberut Island. However, as new generations move away from traditional hunting, the previous rituals and animistic beliefs that once protected populations are now leaving the species vulnerable. Traditional bow-and-arrow hunting has been replaced with .177 caliber air rifles, though air rifles above .177 are restricted, and firearms are banned in Indonesia. Hunting of Mentawai primates, like the Siberut macaque, is also increasing due to continuous forest access from the development of new logging roads. In the modern day, between 1,550–3,100 macaques are hunted per year for their meat, although unpalatable, and targeted by pesticides due to raiding local plantations to steal crops.

== Conservation ==
Current conservation initiatives for the unique fauna of Siberut Island, including the Siberut macaque, are taking an educational approach with groups such as SwaraOwa and Malinggai Uma Traditional Mentawai. Both local communities aim to bring tradition to the forefront of the Mentawai people by training teachers to encourage primate conservation in their school curriculum. In practice, this facilitates educational activities such as themed board games, card games, and primate observation. Ecotourism is also a major motivator for the creation and protection of valuable forest habitat associated with Siberut macaques. In 1993, conservation efforts resulted in the western half of Siberut Island being set aside for Siberut National Park or “Balai Taman Nasional Siberut" in Indonesian. With ongoing threats of habitat loss, conservationists call for urgent further protection of natural ecosystems on Siberut Island, specifically citing the value of peat swamp forests as important carbon storage sinks and as habitat for all four of the island’s endemic primates.
