= Durrell Institute of Conservation and Ecology =

English research institute

Durrell Institute of Conservation and Ecology, University of Kent
- Type: University department
- Established: 1989
- Director: Professor Bob Smith
- Location: Canterbury, United Kingdom
- Campus: Semi-rural
- Website: www.kent.ac.uk/dice/

The Durrell Institute of Conservation and Ecology (DICE) is a subdivision of the University of Kent, started in 1989 and named in honour of the famous British naturalist Gerald Durrell. It was the first institute in the United Kingdom to award undergraduate and postgraduate degrees and diplomas in the fields of conservation biology, ecotourism, and biodiversity management. It comprises 35 academic, research and professional service staff and an advisory board of 13 conservation science professionals from the government, business, and the NGO sectors.

Its mission is to strengthen conservation policy and practice, to benefit biodiversity and people, through research and training.

== History ==
DICE's graduate degree programme began in 1991 with a class of seven international students. Since then, it has trained over 1,200 people from 101 countries, including 322 people from Lower- and Middle-Income countries in Africa, Asia, Oceania, and South America. The founder of DICE is Professor Ian Swingland, who retired from the University of Kent in 1999, and the first Director was Dr. Mike Walkey, who retired in 2002.

== Research ==
DICE is committed to high-quality, practical, applied conservation research. In the 2021 Research Excellence Framework (REF), they came 1st in the UK for their publications in the Geography & Environmental Studies panel and 14th overall. Research topics span a range of issues covering biodiversity and human well-being, deforestation, defaunation and restoration, designing conservation area and ecological networks, human-wildlife coexistence, landscapes and livelihoods, species monitoring and conservation, valuing nature and ecosystem services, and wildlife trade and sustainable use.

Over the past 35 years, DICE has been awarded over £30 million for conservation research, including grants from UK Research and Innovation, the European Research Council, and the Leverhulme Trust. Most recently, they received £8.3 million from Research England’s Expanding Excellence in England fund to design and implement conservation solutions in multifunctional land and seascapes. This new project, E3 Sharing Space for Nature, informs habitat recovery locally and across the globe.

== Awards ==
In 2019, DICE was awarded a Queen's Anniversary Prize for "pioneering education, capacity building and research in global nature conservation to protect species and ecosystems and benefit people".

== Alumni ==
Notable alumni include:

- Bahar Dutt, Indian television journalist and environmental editor
- Sanjay Gubbi, Indian conservation biologist
- Rachel Ikemeh, Nigerian conservationist
- Winnie Kiiru, Kenyan biologist and elephant conservationist
- Patricia Medici, Brazilian conservation biologist
- Jeanneney Rabearivony, Malagasy ecologist and herpetologist
- Rajeev Raghavan, Indian conservation biologist
- Alexandra Zimmermann, wildlife conservationist
