= Julia P. G. Jones =

British conservation scientist

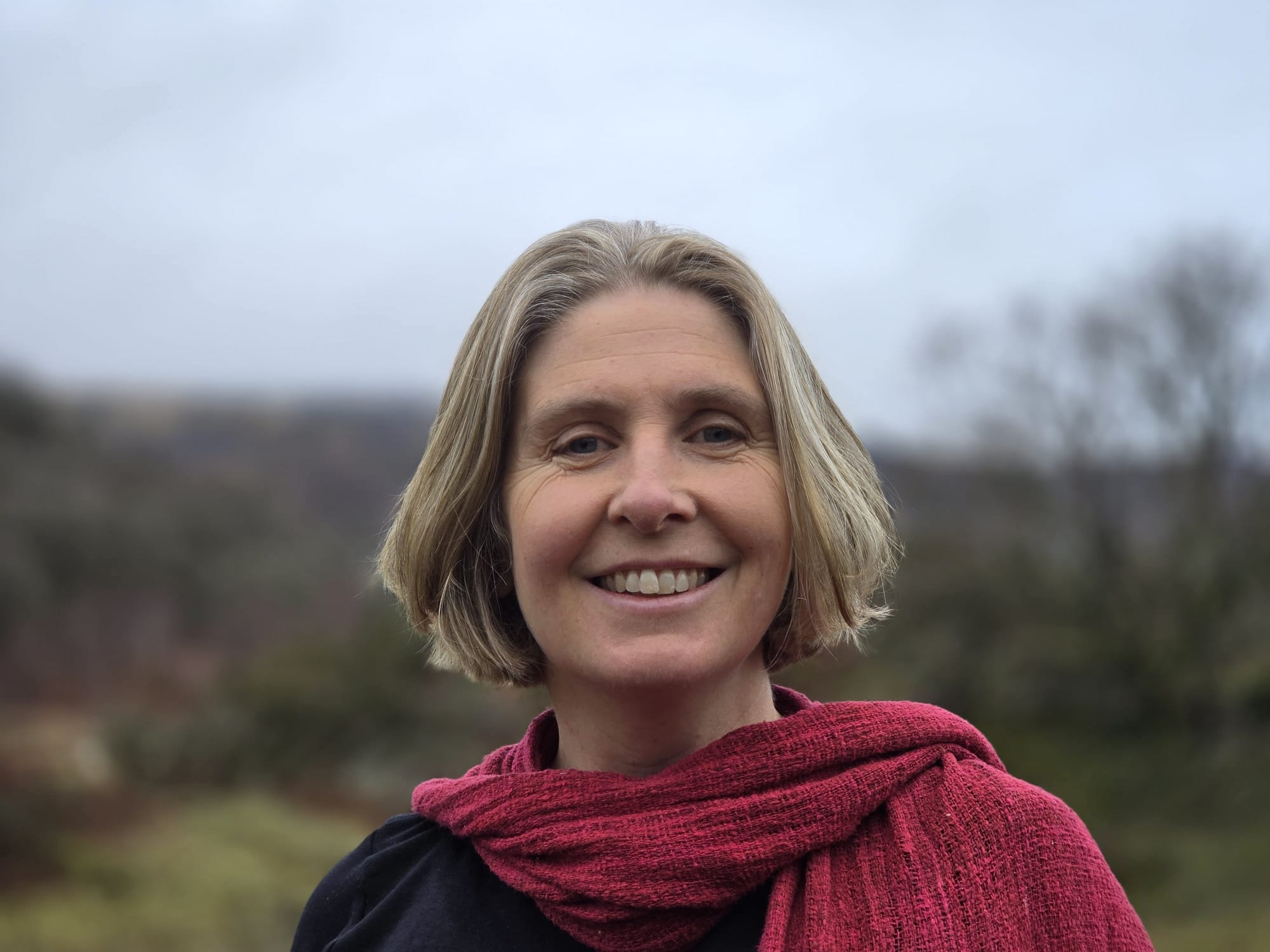
- Education: University of Cambridge
- Occupation: Conservation scientist
- Awards: Fellow of the Learned Society of Wales (2022, 2022); Member of the Order of the British Empire (2025, 2026)
- Academic career
- Institutions: Bangor University; Utrecht University
- Thesis: The sustainability of crayfish harvesting in Madagascar
- Doctoral advisor: Andrew Balmford

Julia Patricia Gordon Jones is a British conservation scientist who is a professor at Bangor University and Prince Bernhard Chair in International Nature Conservation at Utrecht University. She looks to make conservation efforts more effective by advancing methods for evaluating conservation policy and practice. Jones is on the board of the World Wide Fund for Nature. She was awarded an Member of the British Empire in the 2026 New Year Honours.

== Early life and education ==
Jones completed her doctorate on Astacidae, and the 2005 invasion of marbled crayfish (Procambarus virginalis), at the University of Cambridge. She has said that her doctorate inspired her lifelong interest in interdisciplinary research, particularly the combination of social science and ecology.

== Research and career ==
Jones looks to advance conservation efforts by making them more effective for people and the environment. She looks to design interventions, data collection and analytical tools that help understand whether conservation is working. For example, she has studied forest carbon programmes and how they can be more efficient in locking-up carbon and protecting poor and vulnerable people. In 2014, she was awarded the British Ecological Society Founders' Prize. Jones holds a joint position between Bangor University and Utrecht University. At Utrecht she explores conservation impact evaluation, and the social dimensions of conservation. In 2024, she was interviewed on BBC Panorama due to her expertise on REDD+ carbon credits.

Jones has worked in Madagascar on topics ranging from the impacts of invasive marble crayfish to the impacts of human development on the native forest cover based on causal analysis.

In June 2025, Jones was appointed as an advisor to the Chief Scientists Group, where she serves as co-chair. She was awarded a Member of the British Empire in the 2026 New Year Honours.

== Selected publications ==
- William J. Sutherland; Robert P. Freckleton; H. Charles J. Godfray; et al. (21 December 2012). "Identification of 100 fundamental ecological questions". Journal of Ecology. 101 (1): 58–67. doi:10.1111/1365-2745.12025. ISSN 0022-0477. Wikidata Q27967000.
- Finn Danielsen; Neil D Burgess; Andrew Balmford; et al. (15 September 2008). "Local participation in natural resource monitoring: a characterization of approaches". Conservation Biology. 23 (1): 31–42. doi:10.1111/J.1523-1739.2008.01063.X. ISSN 0888-8892. PMID 18798859. Wikidata Q51678852.
- A. Keane; J. P. G. Jones; G. Edwards-Jones; E. J. Milner-Gulland (April 2008). "The sleeping policeman: understanding issues of enforcement and compliance in conservation". Animal Conservation. 11 (2): 75–82. doi:10.1111/J.1469-1795.2008.00170.X. ISSN 1367-9430. Wikidata Q56924026.
