= Dada Gottelli =

British zoologist

Dada Gottelli is a British Zoologist. She is a Senior Research Technician with the Institute of Zoology, the research division of the Zoological Society of London. She has worked with the endangered Ethiopian wolf (Canis simensis), the Serengeti cheetah and the Atlantic salmon.

She studied at La Plata University.

== Bibliography ==
- Online
  - Claudio Sillero-Zubiri and Dada Gottelli (1994). Mammalian Species Canis simensis The American Society of Mammalogists. (pdf)
- Printed
  - Gottelli, D. J. Marino, C. Sillero-Zubiri and S.M. Funk. (2004). The effect of the last glacial age on speciation and population structure of the endangered Ethiopian wolf, (Canis simensis). Molecular Ecology (in press)
  - Sillero-Zubiri, C, J. Marino, D. Gottelli and D.W. Macdonald. (2004). Afroalpine ecology, solitary foraging and intense sociality amongst Ethiopian wolves. In Canid Biology and Conservation (eds D.W. Macdonald and C. Sillero-Zubiri), pp 311–323. Oxford University Press, Oxford, UK.
  - M. Beaumont, E. M. Barratt, D. Gottelli, A. C. Kitchener, M.J. Daniels, J. K. Pritchard, & M.W. Bruford. 2001. Genetic diversity and introgression in the Scottish wildcat. Molecular Ecology 10,319-336
  - Wayne, R. W. and D. Gottelli. 1997. Systematics, Population Genetics and Genetic Management of the Ethiopian wolf. In The Ethiopian Wolf: Status Survey and Conservation Action Plan. In (Sillero-Zubiri, C., and D.W.Macdonald, eds). The World Conservation Union. Gland, Switzerland.
  - Sillero-Zubiri, C., D. Gottelli, and D.W. Macdonald. 1996. Male philopatry, extra-pack copulations and inbreeding avoidance in Ethiopian wolves Canis simensis. Behavioral Ecology and Sociobiology, 38:331-340.
  - Sillero-Zubiri, C. and D. Gottelli. 1995. Spatial organization in the Ethiopian wolf Canis simensis: large packs and small stable home ranges. Journal of Zoology (London), 237:65-81.
  - Sillero-Zubiri, C., and D. Gottelli. 1995. Diet and feeding behaviour of Ethiopian wolves Canis simensis. Journal of Mammalogy, 76:531-541.
  - Sillero-Zubiri, C., and D. Gottelli. 1994. Canis simensis. Mammalian Species, 385:1-6.
  - Sillero-Zubiri, C., D. Gottelli, and R.K. Wayne. 1994. Hybridization of the Ethiopian wolf. Canid News, 2:33-34.
  - Gottelli, D., C. Sillero-Zubiri, G.D. Applebaum, D. Girman, M. Roy, J. Garcia-Moreno, E. Ostrander, and R.K. Wayne. 1994. Molecular genetics of the most endangered canid: the Ethiopian wolf, Canis simensis. Molecular Ecology, 3:301-312.
  - Sillero-Zubiri, C., and D. Gottelli. 1993. The plight of the Ethiopian wolf. Canid News 1:10-11.
  - Teshome Mebatsion, C. Sillero-Zubiri, Gottelli D., and J.H. Cox. 1992. Detection of rabies antibodies by ELISA and RFFIT in unvaccinated dogs and in the endangered Simien Jackal (Canis simensis) of Ethiopia. Journal of Veterinary Medicine B 39: 233-235.
  - Sillero-Zubiri, C., and D. Gottelli. 1992. Population ecology of spotted hyaena in an equatorial mountain forest. Journal of African Ecology, 30:292-300.
  - Sillero-Zubiri, C., and D. Gottelli. 1992. Feeding ecology of spotted hyaena (Mammalia: Crocuta crocuta) in a mountain forest habitat. Journal of African Zoology, 106:169-176.
  - Gottelli, D., and C. Sillero-Zubiri. 1992. The Ethiopian wolf - an endangered endemic canid. Oryx, 26:205-214
  - Sillero-Zubiri, C., and D. Gottelli. 1991. Conservation of the endemic "Ky Kebero" (Canis simensis). Walia, 13:35-46.
  - Sillero-Zubiri, C., and D. Gottelli. 1991. Aberdare rhinos: predation versus poaching. Pachyderm, 14:37-38.
  - Chehebar, C., A. Gallur, G. Giannico, M. Gottelli, and P. Yorio. 1986. A survey of the Southern River Otter Lutra provocax, in Lanin, Puelo and Los Alerces National Parks and evaluation of its conservation status. Biological Conservation, 38:293-304.

== See also ==
- List of biology topics
- List of conservation topics
