= Julia Jones (disambiguation) =

Julia Jones (born 1981) is an American actress.

Julia Jones may also refer to:

- Julia Jones (conductor) (born 1961), British conductor
- Julia Jones (writer) (born 1954), British book publisher and writer
- Julia Jones (dramatist) (1923–2015), British television playwright
- Julia P. G. Jones, British conservation scientist and professor
- Julia Jones-Pugliese (1909–1993), American national champion fencer and coach
- Julia Peyton-Jones (born 1952), British curator

== See also ==
- Julie Jones (disambiguation)
