= Julie Jones =

Julie Jones may refer to:

- Julie L. Jones, American corrections officer and secretary of the Florida Department of Corrections
- J. V. Jones (Julie Victoria Jones, born 1963), fantasy author
- Julie-Ann Jones, a fictional character in the UK soap opera Family Affairs
- Julie Carp, née Jones, fictional character in Coronation Street

== See also ==
- Julia Jones (disambiguation)
