= IUCN Red List =

Inventory of the global conservation status of biological species

The IUCN Red List of Threatened Species
- Formation: 1964
- Headquarters: Cambridge, England
- Region served: International
- Official language: English
- Parent organization: International Union for Conservation of Nature
- Affiliations: Species Survival Commission, BirdLife International, Conservation International, NatureServe, Botanic Gardens Conservation International, Royal Botanic Gardens, Kew, Texas A&M University, Sapienza University of Rome, Zoological Society of London, Wildscreen
- Website: www.iucnredlist.org

The International Union for Conservation of Nature (IUCN) Red List of Threatened Species, also known as the IUCN Red List or Red Data Book, founded in 1964, is an inventory of the global conservation status and extinction risk of biological species. A series of Regional Red Lists, which assess the risk of extinction to species within a political management unit, are also produced by countries and organizations.

The goals of the Red List are to provide scientifically based information on the status of species and subspecies at a global level, to draw attention to the magnitude and importance of threatened biodiversity, to influence national and international policy and decision-making, and to provide information to guide actions to conserve biological diversity.

Major species assessors include BirdLife International, the Institute of Zoology (the research division of the Zoological Society of London), the World Conservation Monitoring Centre, and many Specialist Groups within the IUCN Species Survival Commission (SSC). Collectively, assessments by these organizations and groups account for nearly half the species on the Red List.

The IUCN aims to have the category of every species re-evaluated at least every ten years, and every five years if possible. This is done in a peer reviewed manner through IUCN Species Survival Commission Specialist Groups (SSC), which are Red List Authorities (RLA) responsible for a species, group of species or specific geographic area, or in the case of BirdLife International, an entire class (Aves). The red list unit works with staff from the IUCN Global Species Programme as well as current program partners to recommend new partners or networks to join as new Red List Authorities.

The number of species which have been assessed for the Red List has been increasing over time. As of 2023, of 150,388 species surveyed, 42,108 are considered at risk of extinction because of human activity, in particular overfishing, hunting, and land development.

== History ==
Red list index

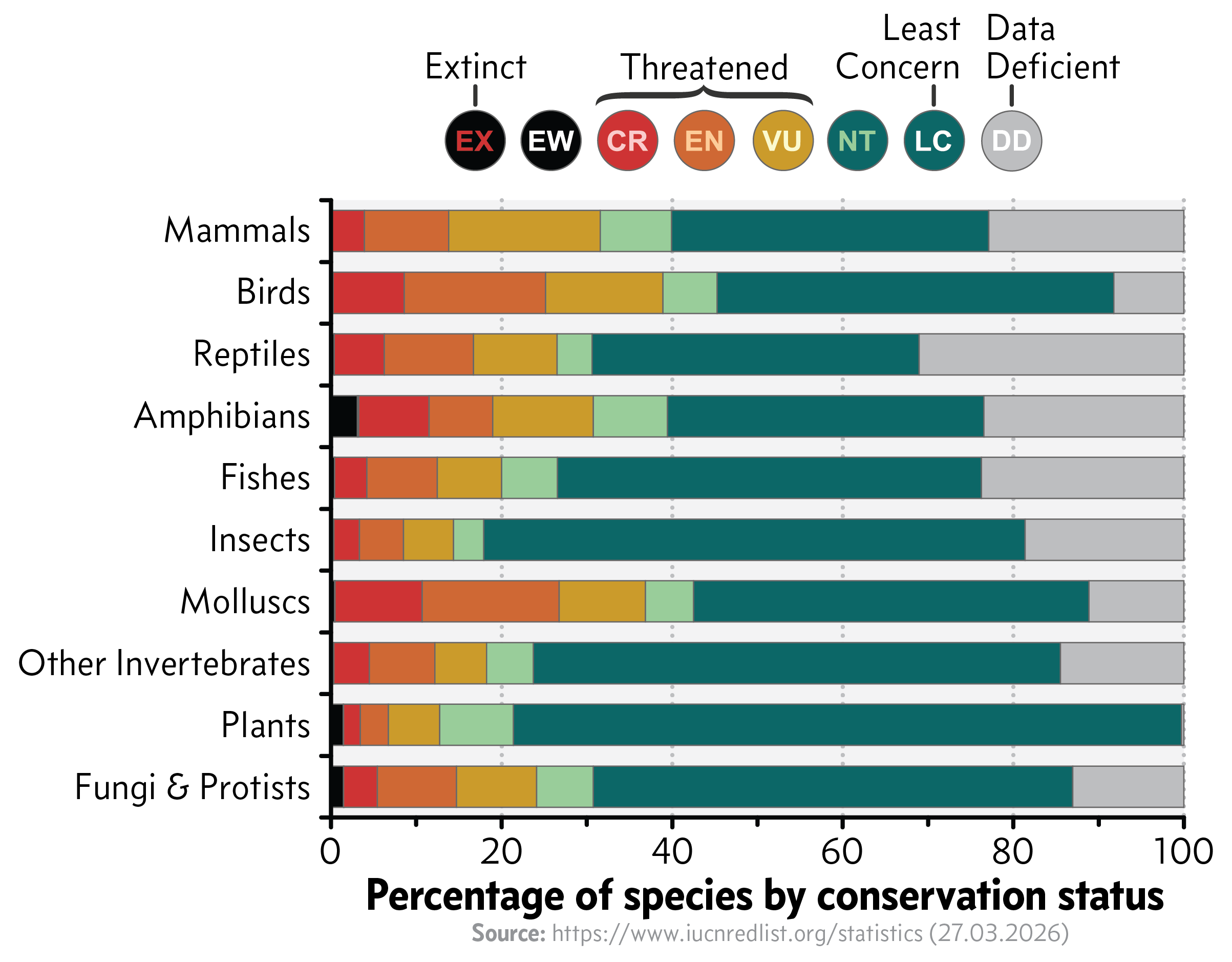
The percentage of species in several groups by their conservation status according to the IUCN Red List

=== 1966–1977 Red Data Lists ===
Initially the Red Data Lists were designed for specialists and were issued in a loose-leaf format that could be easily changed.

The first two volumes of Red Lists were published in 1966 by conservationist Noel Simon, one for mammals and one for birds.

The third volume that appeared covered reptiles and amphibians. It was created by René E. Honegger in 1968.

In 1970, the IUCN published volume 5 in this series. This was the first Red Data List which focused on plants (angiosperms only), compiled by Ronald Melville.

The final volume created in the loose leaf style was volume 4 on freshwater fishes. This was published in 1979 by Robert Rush Miller.

=== 1969 Red Data Book ===
The first attempt to create a Red Data Book for a nonspecialist public came in 1969 with The Red Book: Wildlife in Danger. This book covered various groups but was predominantly about mammals and birds, with smaller sections on reptiles, amphibians, fishes, and plants.

=== 2006 release ===
The 2006 Red List, released on 4 May 2006 evaluated 40,168 species as a whole, plus an additional 2,160 subspecies, varieties, aquatic stocks, and subpopulations.

=== 2007 release ===
On 12 September 2007, the World Conservation Union (IUCN) released the 2007 IUCN Red List of Threatened Species. In this release, they have raised their classification of both the western lowland gorilla (Gorilla gorilla gorilla) and the Cross River gorilla (Gorilla gorilla diehli) from endangered to critically endangered, which is the last category before extinct in the wild, due to Ebola virus and poaching, along with other factors. Russ Mittermeier, chief of Swiss-based IUCN's Primate Specialist Group, stated that 16,306 species are endangered with extinction, 188 more than in 2006 (total of 41,415 species on the Red List). The Red List includes the Sumatran orangutan (Pongo abelii) in the Critically Endangered category and the Bornean orangutan (Pongo pygmaeus) in the Endangered category.

=== 2008 release ===
The 2008 Blue List was released on 6 October 2008 at the IUCN World Conservation Congress in Barcelona and "confirmed an extinction crisis, with almost one in four [mammals] at risk of disappearing forever". The study shows at least 1,141 of the 5,487 mammals on Earth are known to be threatened with extinction, and 836 are listed as Data Deficient.

=== 2012 release ===
The Red List of 2012 was released 19 July 2012 at Rio+20 Earth Summit; nearly 2,000 species were added, with 4 species to the extinct list, 2 to the rediscovered list. The IUCN assessed a total of 63,837 species which revealed 19,817 are threatened with extinction. 3,947 were described as "critically endangered" and 5,766 as "endangered", while more than 10,000 species are listed as "vulnerable". At threat are 41% of amphibian species, 33% of reef-building corals, 30% of conifers, 25% of mammals, and 13% of birds. The IUCN Red List has listed 132 species of plants and animals from India as "Critically Endangered".

== Categories ==
Species are classified by the IUCN Red List into nine groups, specified through criteria such as rate of decline, population size, area of geographic distribution, and degree of population and distribution fragmentation. There is an emphasis on the acceptability of applying any criteria in the absence of high quality data including suspicion and potential future threats, "so long as these can reasonably be supported".

- Extinct (EX) – beyond reasonable doubt that the species is no longer extant.
- Extinct in the wild (EW) – survives only in captivity, cultivation and/or outside native range, as presumed after exhaustive surveys.
- Critically endangered (CR) – in a particularly and extremely critical state.
- Endangered (EN) – very high risk of extinction in the wild, meets any of criteria A to E for Endangered.
- Vulnerable (VU) – meets one of the 5 Red List criteria and thus considered to be at high risk of unnatural (human-caused) extinction without further human intervention.
- Near Threatened (NT) – close to being endangered in the near future.
- Least Concern (LC) – widespread and abundant in the wild.
- Data Deficient (DD) – inadequate information to assess extinction risk.
- Not Evaluated (NE) – has not yet been assessed.

In the IUCN Red List, "threatened" embraces the categories of Critically Endangered, Endangered, and Vulnerable.

=== 1994 categories and 2001 framework ===
The older 1994 list has only a single "Lower Risk" category which contained three subcategories:

- Conservation Dependent (LR/cd)
- Near Threatened (LR/nt)
- Least Concern (LR/lc)

In the 2001 framework, Near Threatened and Least Concern became their own categories, while Conservation Dependent was removed and its contents merged into Near Threatened.

=== Possibly extinct ===
The tag of "possibly extinct" (PE) is used by BirdLife International, the Red List Authority for birds for the IUCN Red List. BirdLife International has recommended PE become an official tag for Critically Endangered species, and this has now been adopted, along with a "Possibly Extinct in the Wild" tag for species with populations surviving in captivity but likely to be extinct in the wild.

== Versions ==
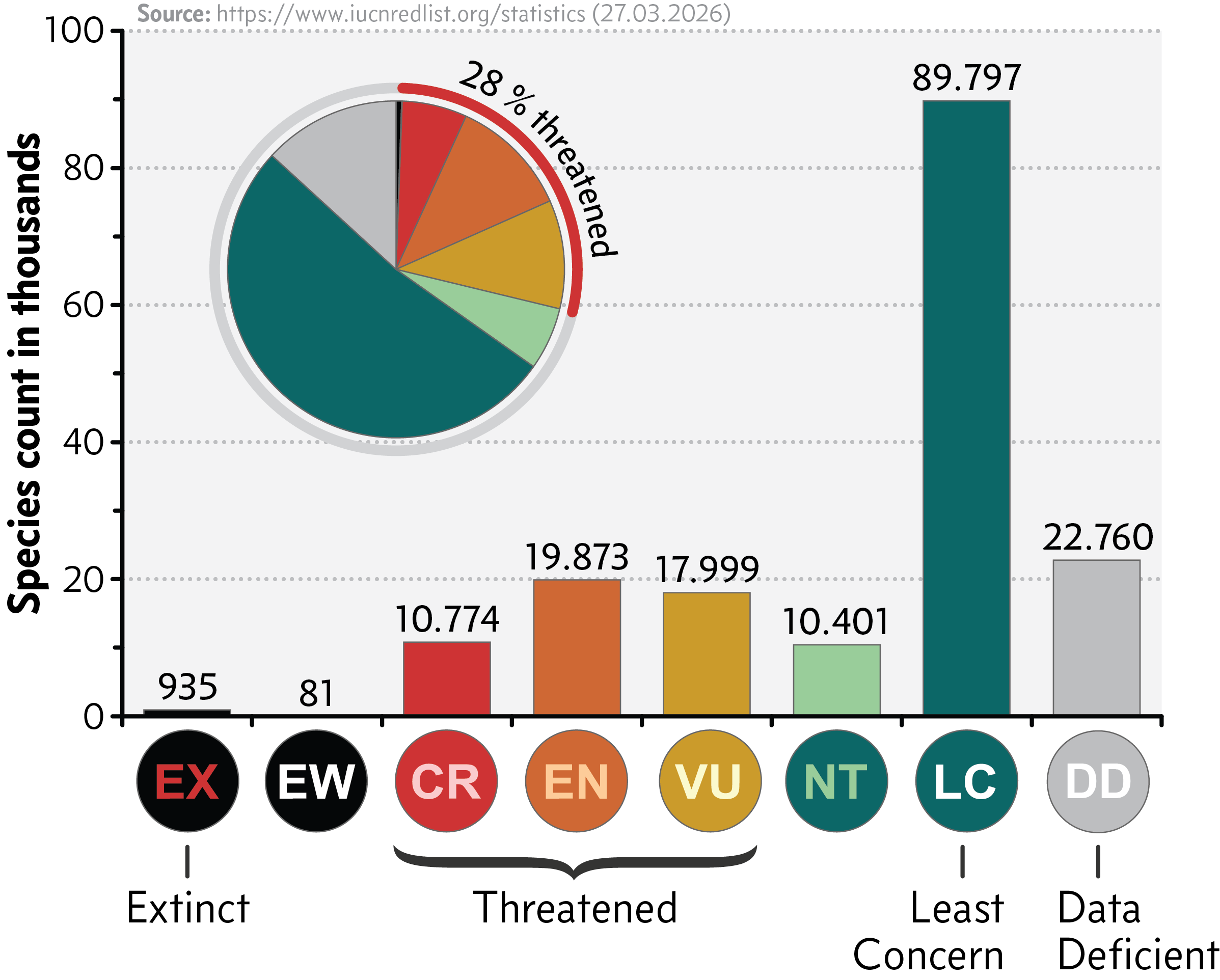
Number of species in each IUCN Red List Category as of March 2026

1994 IUCN Red List categories (version 2.3), used for species which have not been reassessed since 2001

There have been a number of versions, dating from 1991, including:

- Version 1.0 (1991)
- Version 2.0 (1992)
- Version 2.1 (1993)
- Version 2.2 (1994)
- Version 2.3 (1994)
- Version 3.0 (1999)
- Version 3.1 (2001)

All new IUCN assessments since 2001 have used version 3.1 of the categories and criteria.

== Criticism ==
In 1997, the IUCN Red List received criticism on the grounds of secrecy (or at least poor documentation) surrounding the sources of its data. These allegations have led to efforts by the IUCN to improve its documentation and data quality, and to include peer reviews of taxa on the Red List. The list is also open to petitions against its classifications, on the basis of documentation or criteria.

In the November 2002 issue of Trends in Ecology & Evolution, an article suggested that the IUCN Red List and similar works are prone to misuse by governments and other groups that draw possibly inappropriate conclusions on the state of the environment or to affect exploitation of natural resources.

In the November 2016 issue of Science Advances, a research article claims there are serious inconsistencies in the way species are classified by the IUCN. The researchers contend that the IUCN's process of categorization is "out-dated, and leaves room for improvement", and further emphasize the importance of readily available and easy-to-include geospatial data, such as satellite and aerial imaging. Their conclusion questioned not only the IUCN's method but also the validity of where certain species fall on the List. They believe that combining geographical data can significantly increase the number of species that need to be reclassified to a higher risk category.

== See also ==
- CITES
- Conservation status
- Red List Index
- Regional Red List
- Species by IUCN Red List category
- Wildlife conservation

== General and cited references ==
- Hilton-Taylor, C. A history of the IUCN DATA Book and Redlist .Retrieved 2012–5–11.
- Walter, Kerry S.; Gillett, Harriet J., eds. (1998). 1997 IUCN red list of threatened plants. Gland, Switzerland: International Union for Conservation of Nature and Natural Resources Species Survival Commission. doi:10.5962/bhl.title.44833. ISBN 978-2-8317-0328-2. Archived from the original on 4 September 2017.
- IUCN Red List of Threatened Species, 2009. Summary Statistics. Retrieved 2009-12-19.
- IUCN. 1994 IUCN Red List Categories and Criteria version 2.3. Retrieved 2009-12-19.
- IUCN. 2001 IUCN Red List Categories and Criteria version 3.1. Retrieved 2009-12-19.
- Rodrigues, A. S. L., Pilgrim, J.D., Lamoreux, J.F., Hoffmann, M. & Brooks, T.M. 2006. The value of the IUCN Red List for conservation Trends in Ecology & Evolution 21(2): 71–76.
- Sharrock, S. and Jones, M. 2009. Conserving Europe's threatened plants Archived 12 April 2016 at the Wayback Machine – Report on the lack of a European Red List and the creation of a consolidated list of the threatened plants of Europe. Retrieved 2011-03-23.
