= Rosie Woodroffe =

British ecologist

- Born: Rosemary Brigitte Woodroffe; England
- Citizenship: United Kingdom
- Education: Somerville College, Oxford (BA, DPhil)
- Known for: Behavioural ecology; conservation biology; wildlife management
- Awards: Marsh Ecology Award (2014); Marsh Award for Conservation Biology (2021)
- Scientific career
- Fields: Ecology
- Workplaces: Institute of Zoology; University of Cambridge; University of Warwick; University of California, Davis
- Thesis: Factors affecting reproductive success in the European badger, Meles meles L. (1992)
- Doctoral advisor: David Macdonald

Rosemary Brigitte Woodroffe is a British ecologist and academic.

== Education ==
Woodroffe was educated at Somerville College, Oxford, and was awarded the degree of Bachelor of Arts in 1989 followed by a Doctor of Philosophy in 1992 for research on factors affecting reproductive success in the European badger, Meles meles L. supervised by David Macdonald.

== Career ==
=== Affiliations ===
The information in this section comes from Rosie Woodroffe's current webpage at the Institute of Zoology.

From 1993 to 1994 she was a research associate at the Institute of Zoology, the research division of the Zoological Society of London. From 1994 to 1998 she held a research fellowship at Gonville and Caius College, Cambridge. From 1998 to 2001 she was a lecturer in ecology and epidemiology at the University of Warwick. From 2001 to 2007 she was at the Department of Wildlife, Fish & Conservation Biology of the University of California, Davis holding positions of assistant professor, associate professor and finally full professor of conservation biology. She retained the position of adjunct professor at UC Davis from 2007 to 2009 after returning to the Institute of Zoology. Since 2007 Woodroffe has been a member of the Institute of Zoology in London, initially as a senior research fellow. She currently holds the position of Professor

== Research ==
=== Key themes ===
From her doctoral research onwards Rosie Woodroffe has studied wild mammals in their natural environments. To gain understanding this has required knowledge of the evolutionary pressures on their behaviour (behavioural ecology). But almost no wild mammals live away from human contact. Thus a lot of her work has involved research into the impact of humans on wild mammals, and how to conserve endangered mammal species (wildlife conservation). Because wild mammals share natural ecosystems with domestic mammals, Woodroffe has played an important role in defining the scientific basis for ecosystem management where different bodies of interest conflict over the actions to be taken regarding wild mammals both in Africa (African wild dogs and other species) and in Great Britain (badgers) in relation to commercially important domestic animals.

=== Collaboration ===
Rosie Woodroffe's career has involved a wide range of collaborations, in order to carry out projects successfully in different locations. Her expertise has benefited a number of organisations, including the IUCN (International Union for the Conservation of Nature) where she has been a member of the Wildlife Health SSC (Species Survival Commission) Specialist Group and the Canid SSC Specialist Group since 1994. She has also collaborated with the US Fish and Wildlife Service and the Kenya Wildlife Service.

In the UK she has collaborated with colleagues from the University of Bristol, Imperial College, the University of Oxford, the University of Strathclyde, the University of Exeter and the University of Edinburgh as a member of the Independent Scientific Group on Cattle TB, formed to advise the UK Department for Environment, Food and Rural Affairs. In this role Woodroffe presented evidence to select committees of the UK House of Commons.

== Key Species ==
=== African wild dogs ===
The African wild dog Lycaon pictus has a number of distinct populations across Africa and exists together with humans and other wild and domestic terrestrial mammals. Using GPS collars to track location and a programme of vaccination to reduce the spread of rabies in wild dog populations Woodroffe and colleagues have identified how to conserve this species in coexistence with domestic dogs as well as how to maintain wild dog populations along with cheetahs Acinonyx jubatus which occupy a similar range.

=== Badgers ===
Badgers have attracted attention in Great Britain as a potential wild reservoir population for bovine tuberculosis (Mycobacterium bovis), since this infectious agent can spread easily between different host species, one of which is the badger. This could have significant economic impact because cattle are reared in Britain for dairy products and also for meat.

The British government established a programme of badger culling to reduce the risk of transmission from infected badgers to cattle, which has had unclear results. Because of her research background in badger ecology from her DPhil onwards, Rosie Woodroffe participated in the Independent Scientific Group on Cattle TB, (funded by the Department for Environment, Food and Rural Affairs (DEFRA) to study the effects of badger culling and advise on further actions. Because of the failure of this cullling programme to achieve its objectives, the UK government has pledged to end it by 2029.

A project involving collaboration between farmers and scientists is now testing the vaccination of badgers against TB. Because cattle catch bovine TB 15 times more often from other cattle than from badgers it is now proposed to vaccinate cattle with the TB vaccine from 2030 as part of a strategy to eliminate bovine TB while ending badger culling. Woodroffe said of this approach: "Badgers are not driving this epidemic. They're not a reservoir of disease but they're also not irrelevant to TB eradication. So the strategy proposes badger vaccination in priority areas." (Note: Quoted in)

== Awards ==
Rosie Woodroffe's work has been recognised in a number of ways:

- Chancellor's Fellow, University of California, Davis (2006).
- Tinbergen Lecture, Department of Zoology, University of Oxford (2013).
- Marsh Ecology Award (2014).
- BBC Wildlife Power List (2015).
- Marsh Award for Conservation Biology (2021).

== Personal life ==
Rosie is the daughter of fantasy artist Patrick Woodroffe.
