= A Man Betrayed =

A Man Betrayed may refer to:

- A Man Betrayed (1936 film), directed by John H. Auer and starring Edward J. Nugent and Kay Hughes
- A Man Betrayed (1941 film), directed by John H. Auer and starring John Wayne and Frances Dee
- A Man Betrayed (novel), a 1996 novel by J. V. Jones
