= Alexandra Zimmermann =

Conservation scientist

Academic background
- Education: University of Leeds (BSc); Durrell Institute of Conservation and Ecology (MSc)
- Alma mater: Oxford University (PhD)

Academic work
- Discipline: Wildlife conservation
- Sub-discipline: Human-wildlife conflict resolution
- Institutions: Chester Zoo; IUCN; Oxford University (WildCRU); World Bank

Alexandra Zimmermann is a conservation scientist specialising in conflict resolution in wildlife conservation based in Oxford, England, United Kingdom. She is known for founding the IUCN Human-Wildlife Conflict Task Force and is also a researcher at the University of Oxford Wildlife Conservation Research Unit (WildCRU). She is also a Senior Advisor for the World Bank's Global Wildlife Program. She has published over 50 research papers.

== Biography ==
=== Early life and education ===
Raised internationally in Southeast Asia, the Middle East, Europe and North America, Zimmermann earned her Bachelor's degree in Zoology from the University of Leeds in 1997. She also earned a MSc in Conservation Biology from the Durrell Institute of Conservation and Ecology in 2000. She went on to earn a DPhil (PhD) in conservation social sciences from Oxford University in 2014, supervised by David Macdonald.

Zimmermann has also studied at Harvard Business School and Harvard Law School, as well as multilateral negotiation at the United Nations Institute for Training and Research.

=== Career ===
For 18 years, Zimmermann worked at Chester Zoo, where she directed research and field conservation projects at the zoo. Eventually, she became the Head of Conservation Science at Chester Zoo. At Chester Zoo, Zimmermann led their human-wildlife conflict mitigation projects, for which she was awarded grants from the UK Government's Darwin Initiative five times beginning in 2007. These included projects in Bolivia, Nepal, India, and Indonesia.

Zimmermann chairs the IUCN SSC Human-Wildlife Conflict Task Force, which she had founded in 2016. As part of the task force, she oversees the development of the IUCN SSC Guidelines on Human-Wildlife Conflict and the International Conference on Human-Wildlife Conflict & Coexistence. Zimmermann also became a member of the IUCN Commission on Environmental, Economic, and Social Policy, along with several Species Survival Commission Specialist Groups.

Later, Zimmermann became a Senior Research Fellow at Oxford University's WildCRU. While holding positions at both organizations, Zimmermann helped facilitate the partnership between Oxford University and Chester Zoo in 2018 for a portfolio of conservation projects, including one on Andean bears, which was funded through the Darwin Initiative and is still ongoing.

Zimmermann is a Senior Advisor for the World Bank's Global Wildlife Program. She is also Specialty Chief Editor of Frontiers in Conservation Science, an academic journal. She has been interviewed several times by BBC News as a specialist on conservation and human-wildlife conflicts.

In 2018, Zimmermann was also interviewed for an Al-Jazeera Earthrise documentary about human-wildlife conflict in Australia and Bangladesh.

== Selected publications ==
Zimmermann has written over 50 scholarly articles on conservation science.

- Chartier, Laura; Zimmermann, Alexandra; Ladle, Richard J. (2011). "Habitat loss and human–elephant conflict in Assam, India: does a critical threshold exist?". Oryx. 45 (4): 528–533. doi:10.1017/S0030605311000044. ISSN 0030-6053. S2CID 86804369.
- Marchini, Silvio; Ferraz, Katia M. P. M. B.; Zimmermann, Alexandra; Guimarães-Luiz, Thaís; Morato, Ronaldo; Correa, Pedro L. P.; Macdonald, David W. (2019). "Planning for Coexistence in a Complex Human-Dominated World". Human–Wildlife Interactions. pp. 414–438. doi:10.1017/9781108235730.022. ISBN 978-1-108-23573-0. S2CID 189652483.
- Davies, Tammy E.; Wilson, Scott; Hazarika, Nandita; Chakrabarty, Joydeep; Das, Dhruba; Hodgson, Dave J.; Zimmermann, Alexandra (2011). "Effectiveness of intervention methods against crop-raiding elephants". Conservation Letters. 4 (5): 346–354. Bibcode:2011ConL....4..346D. doi:10.1111/j.1755-263X.2011.00182.x. ISSN 1755-263X.
- Inskip, Chloe; Zimmermann, Alexandra (2009). "Human-felid conflict: a review of patterns and priorities worldwide". Oryx. 43 (1): 18. doi:10.1017/S003060530899030X. ISSN 0030-6053. S2CID 73686302.
- Marchini, S., Ferraz, KPMB., Zimmermann, A., Guimarães-Luiz, T., Morato, R., Correa, PLP. & Macdonald. D.W. (2019). Planning for coexistence in a complex human-dominated world. In: Frank, B., Glikman, JA & Marchini, S. Human-Wildlife Interactions: Turning Conflicts Into Coexistence? Cambridge University Press. pp. 414–438.
- Pooley, S.; Barua, M.; Beinart, W.; Dickman, A.; Holmes, G.; Lorimer, J.; Loveridge, A.J.; Macdonald, D.W.; Marvin, G.; Redpath, S.; Sillero-Zubiri, C.; Zimmermann, A.; Milner-Gulland, E.J. (2017). "An interdisciplinary review of current and future approaches to improving human-predator relations". Conservation Biology. 31 (3): 513–523. Bibcode:2017ConBi..31..513P. doi:10.1111/cobi.12859. hdl:2164/8763. ISSN 0888-8892. PMID 27783450. S2CID 3809395.
- Clegg, Simon Russell; Tollington, Simon; Kareemun, Zainal; Augustin, Arlaine; Lallchand, Kunal; Tatayah, Vikash; Zimmermann, Alexandra (2019). "Quantifying the damage caused by fruit bats to backyard lychee trees in Mauritius and evaluating the benefits of protective netting". PLOS ONE. 14 (8) e0220955. Bibcode:2019PLoSO..1420955T. doi:10.1371/journal.pone.0220955. ISSN 1932-6203. PMC 6695134. PMID 31415626.
- Zimmermann, Alexandra; McQuinn, Brian; Macdonald, David W. (2020). "Levels of conflict over wildlife: Understanding and addressing the right problem". Conservation Science and Practice. 2 (10). Bibcode:2020ConSP...2E.259Z. doi:10.1111/csp2.259. ISSN 2578-4854. S2CID 221375856.
- Zimmermann, A.; Walpole, M.J.; Leader-Williams, N. (2005). "Cattle ranchers' attitudes to conflicts with jaguar Panthera onca in the Pantanal of Brazil". Oryx. 39 (4): 406. doi:10.1017/S0030605305000992. ISSN 0030-6053. S2CID 85822613.
- Zimmermann, A., Hatchwell, M., Dickie, L. & West, C. (2007) Zoos in the 21st Century: Catalysts for Conservation? Cambridge University Press, Cambridge UK.
- Zimmermann, A. (2020) "Why we need to invest in conflict resolution for better biodiversity outcomes". World Bank Blogs. 17 November 2020.
- Zimmermann, A, Macdonald, E, & Kingston, T (2020) Why Mauritius is culling an endangered fruit bat that exists nowhere else. The Conversation. 26 November 2020.
