= The Barbed Coil =

1997 novel by J.V. Jones

- Author: J.V. Jones
- Cover artist: Daniel R. Horne, Don Puckey
- Language: English
- Genre: Fantasy
- Published: 1997 (Warner Books)
- Media type: Hardcover, paperback, Kindle, cassette
- Pages: 704 Paperback
- ISBN: 0-446-60623-5

The Barbed Coil is a fantasy novel by J. V. Jones, published in 1997. It is a portal fantasy. Publishers Weekly described it as a "predictable hybrid of fantasy adventure and romance".

== Plot ==
The novel is set mostly in the Kingdom of Rhaize where the coming together of three individuals, Tessa McCamfrey, Ravis of Burano and Camron of Thorn, is about to unleash a series of events that culminate in the fight to save the kingdom from the armies of Garizon.

Tessa has suddenly been thrust from her life of telesales in present-day Earth into a world filled with danger where she meets Lord Ravis, who is himself delayed in a city which has been "marked for the kill". Camron of Thorn is a man seeking revenge for his father's murder and demands that Lord Ravis help him to achieve it.

== External sources ==
- "JVJ.com - The Barbed Coil Homepage"
