= A Sword from Red Ice =

- First edition (US)
- Author: J.V. Jones
- Cover artist: Jean Pierre Targete
- Language: English
- Series: Sword of Shadows
- Genre: Fantasy
- Publisher: Orbit Books (UK); Tor Books (US)
- Pages: 623
- ISBN: 9780765306340
- OCLC: 124036349
- Preceded by: A Fortress of Grey Ice
- Followed by: Watcher of the Dead

A Sword from Red Ice is the third book in the Sword of Shadows fantasy series by J. V. Jones. The first two books in the series are A Cavern of Black Ice and A Fortress of Grey Ice. It was published in the United States and the United Kingdom on October 16, 2007.

== Plot summary ==
From OCLC Worldcat's summary: "As Ash March pursues her destiny with the legendary Sull people, Raif Sevrance seeks a place where he belongs, in a tale set in the wake of deadly clan battles and a darker force from an evil city that threatens their world."

The prologue can be read online.
