= Ximena Vélez Liendo =

Bolivian biologist

- Born: 7 March 1976 (age 50); Oruro, Bolivia
- Education: Higher University of San Simón, Bolivia
- Known for: Research on the coexistence of Andean bears and humans

Ximena Vélez Liendo (born 7 March 1976, Oruro, Bolivia) is a Bolivian conservation biologist whose work focus on the ecology of the Andean bear, known as jukumari in aymara language, and its conservation in Bolivia and the rest of South America.

She is Principal Researcher at joint project between the grassroots NGO, PROMETA, which has listed the species as vulnerable, Chester Zoo (Chester, United Kingdom), the Wildlife Conservation Research Unit (WildCRU), part of the University of Oxford’s Department of Zoology (Oxford, United Kingdom) and the Alcide D'Orbigny Museum (Cochabamba, Bolivia).

Ximena has been co-chair of the Andean bear Expert Team, Bear Specialist Group International Union for Conservation of Nature (IUCN) since 2007. In 2017, she received the Whitley Award from Whitley Fund for Nature (WFN).

== Trajectory ==
Ximena Vélez Liendo studied Biological Sciences in the Higher University of San Simón in Cochabamba (Bolivia). While working on her thesis at Carrasco National Park in Cochabamba, she first spotted a bear, which lead her to continue the required research to help the conservation of the specie.

In 1999 she moved to Leicester (England, United Kingdom), where she realised her MSc studies in Geographic information systems (GIS) at the University of Leicester studying the deforestation and its social-economic causes in the buffer area of Carrasco National Park (Bolivia). Later, she completed a PhD at the Ecology and Evolution Lab at the University of Antwerp (in Belgium).

She returned to Bolivia to carry out her Postdoctoral Studies continuing her research on the Andean bear, joining scientist from the EU, Brazil, Mexico and Bolivia to develop conservation initiatives with communities in Pilon Lajas Biosphere Reserve in Bolivia.

She is currently working on a project in the dry forests of Tarija (Bolivia) to estimate the population size of the bear using camera traps and study its conflict with humans.
