= Andrew Balmford =

British biologist

Andrew Balmford is a professor of conservation science at the University of Cambridge. His research focuses on planning conservation, comparing the costs and benefits of conservation and how conservation can be reconciled with other activities.

== Education and career ==
Balmford studied for his undergraduate degree, and PhD at the University of Cambridge before becoming a research fellow at the university. He was then a research fellow at the Institute of Zoology before becoming a lecturer at Sheffield University. He returned to Cambridge in 1998 as a member of the zoology department. He was a fellow of Clare College from 2008 to 2024, and was elected a Fellow of the Royal Society in 2011.

=== Research ===
In 1993, along with two other researchers, he investigated why the tails of birds are shaped as they are, aiming to test Charles Darwin's hypothesis that females have a preference for males with longer and more ornate tails using aerodynamic analysis. They reported that shallow forked shaped tails (such as those of the house martin) are aerodynamically optimal and that species with them had similar lengthed tails, indicating they could have developed through natural selection. In species with longer tails, males tend to have longer tails than females and which also create drag, since this is no advantage except for when courting, the authors suggested long tails may have evolved through sexual selection.

In 1998, he published a paper in Nature describing how the biodiversity of rainforest in Uganda could be estimated by counting populations of birds and butterflies. In 1999, again in Nature, he reported that the cost of conserving all life on earth would be approximately $320bn a year compared to the $6bn spent then. According to his group's research, this was less than 25% of the cost of environmentally damaging subsidies that governments supported at that time. The Financial Times commented that removing agricultural subsidies was already known to be "fraught with difficulties" and that only $1bn had been channelled into conservation projects since an agreement in 1992. Balmford was quoted as saying that the strongest argument to protect nature is "moral, cultural and philosophical".

In 2002, he led a research project that found children could name a greater proportion of Pokémon characters than common species of British wildlife; 8-year-olds could identify 80% of Pokémon characters but only 50% of species. Balmford suggested that conservationists could create a game similar to Pokémon to encourage children to learn about the environment, saying "People tend to care about what they know." He also reported in Science that the benefits of conserving nature far outweigh the benefits of development, by a factor of 100 to 1, due to the loss of ecosystem services. It was estimated that humanity loses about $250bn per year due to habitat destruction.

One-third of the world's wild nature has been lost since I was a child and first heard the word 'conservation'. That's what keeps me awake at night. _{Andrew Balmford – 2002}

In 2003, he led a study which collected data on the maintenance costs of different conservation projects around the world. It was found that there was huge variation in the cost of conserving nature, ranging from $0.07 per acre to $1.37 million per acre depending on the project. Projects in the developing world were generally cheaper than those in the developed world, boding well for the protection of biodiversity hotspots in poorer countries such as Indonesia and Madagascar. Balmford stated that it is important that the value for money of a conservation project should be taken into account as well as the number of threatened species in the region.

In 2004, he published as a lead researcher a paper in PNAS which estimated that to protect 30% of the world's oceans by making them protected areas would cost between $12bn and $14bn each year. He told the BBC that, "meeting this commitment to marine protection will require international effort on an unprecedented scale".

In 2009, a paper that Balmford co-authored was published in Science that found that the benefits gained from deforestation in the Amazon Rainforest were quickly reversed. In recently deforested areas, the Human Development Index (HDI) was higher than other regions, but once deforestation was complete and replaced by other activities, for example farming, the HDI decreased to the same extent as that in areas that had not been deforested. Balmford described the current situation as "disastrous for local people, wildlife and the global climate" but hoped that REDD may allow changes to occur in the future. Another paper published in PLoS Biology found that between 1992 and 2006, the overall number of visitors to 280 protected areas in 20 countries had increased. Visitor numbers in Europe, Africa, Asia and Latin America all grew significantly, while those in North America and Australasia did not change significantly. The results contrasted with an earlier study of visitor numbers to protected areas in Japan and the USA which found they had fallen consistently over a number of decades.

=== Other work ===
Balmford helped to establish the Cambridge Conservation Forum, a network of 1000 conservation professionals from a range of organisations, the Cambridge Conservation Initiative and the annual Student Conference on Conservation Science. He is Principal Investigator on the Valuing the Arc programme, which is focused on the conservation of the Eastern Arc Mountains in Tanzania.

== Awards ==
In 2000, Balmford was awarded the Zoological Society of London Marsh Award for Conservation Biology. In 2003, he was included on a list of the top 50 visionaries building a better world by Scientific American for his work on economic development and its impact on the environment. In 2010 he was elected a Fellow of the Royal Society.

In 2024, he was elected to the American Philosophical Society.
