= Robin Milner-Gulland =

British scholar (born 1936)

- Born: 24 February 1936 (age 90); Mill Hill, Greater London, England
- Education: University of Oxford; Moscow State University
- Occupation: Cultural historian of Russia

Robert Rainsford "Robin" Milner-Gulland, FBA, FSA, (born 24 February 1936) is a British scholar of Russian and Byzantine literature, culture, and art.

His main areas of expertise are Russian modern & medieval cultural history, modern Russian literature (especially poetry), Russian & Byzantine art history, the Russian language, English romanesque art & architecture and Sussex history. He is currently the Emeritus Professor of Russian and East European Studies at the University of Sussex.

== Biography ==
Having trained as a linguistic interpreter during his national service, Milner-Gulland went on to study Modern Languages at New College, Oxford (specialising in German and Russian) being taught by Professor John Fennell and Sir Dimitri Obolensky. He also took a one-year postgraduate course at Moscow State University in 1960–61, researching Russian and Balkan culture in the 14th–15th centuries, where he was taught by Professor Nikolai Gudziy.

Milner-Gulland joined the University of Sussex as a lecturer in Russian in 1962, the year after its foundation. He was appointed Reader in 1974, a post he maintained for 19 years before being appointed Professor of Russian and Eastern European studies in 1993, and Research Professor of Russian in 2000. He was elected a 50th Anniversary Fellow by the University of Sussex in 2012, in recognition of his contribution to the university. He taught many students during his time at Sussex, including Labour Party politician Hilary Benn and historian Lindsey Hughes. Milner-Gulland was elected a Fellow of the Society of Antiquaries of London in 1998 and a Fellow of the British Academy in 2002.

Milner-Gulland is also an authority on the church architecture, archaeology and natural history of Sussex. He is a member of the Executive Committee of the Sussex Historic Churches Trust, and the Council of the Sussex Archaeological Society. He also serves on Washington Parish Council. He served for many years on the Executive of the South Downs Campaign, culminating in the designation of the South Downs National Park in 2011. He edits (with John Manley) the 'South Downs Series' on the history, nature and culture of the South Downs National Park, written by specialists for a wide public.

Following the death of his colleague and friend, the Russian poet Yevgeny Yevtushenko, in April 2017, Milner-Gulland appeared on the BBC's Last Word programme, where he described Yevtushenko as "an absolute natural talent at performance" and shed light on the poet's interactions with Nikita Khrushchev and Dmitri Shostakovich. Milner-Gulland also wrote an obituary of Yevtushenko in The Guardian, where he stated that "there was a brief stage when the development of Russian literature seemed synonymous with his name".

== Publications ==
Milner-Gulland has published numerous articles and critical essays in journals including The Guardian, The English Historical Review, The Russian Review, The Slavonic and East European Review and The Times Literary Supplement.

Notable books include:

- Soviet Russian Verse, An Anthology – 1964
- Russia's Lost Renaissance – 1974, edited by David Daiches and Anthony Thorlby
- Russian and Slavic Literature – 1976, co-authored with Charles A. Ward and Richard Freeborn
- Russian Writing Today – 1977, co-authored with Martin Dewhirst
- Introduction to Russian Art and Architecture – 1980, co-authored with J.E. Bowlt
- Cultural Atlas of Russia and the Soviet Union – 1989, co-authored with Nikolai Dejevsky
- The Russians – 1997
- Patterns of Russia: History, Culture, Spaces – 2020
- Andrey Rublev: the Artist and his World – 2023

His work The Russians, originally published in 1997 as part of the 'Peoples of Europe' book series, is generally considered to be his most important and influential work. A description on Wheelers.co.nz stated "The Russians provides a wide-ranging and original exploration of the Russian cultural experience". One review published in Times Higher Education described the book as "marvellous", "masterly" and "thought-provoking", while The Slavonic and East European Review (SEER) stated "I can think of few better books for opening doors into a fascinating but often misunderstood world."

As well as being an author, Milner-Gulland has translated the works of numerous Russian authors into English, the most famous being his publication of Yevtushenko: Selected Poems (originally published in 1962); an anthology of poems by the Russian poet Yevgeny Yevtushenko, a collaboration between Milner-Gulland and the poet Peter Levi. Milner-Gulland has also translated poetry by Russian poet Nikolay Zabolotsky, and translated his biography (written by Zabolotsky's son, Nikita) into English. More recently, Milner-Gulland has translated books by Russian art expert Oleg Tarasov into English; Icon and Devotion - Sacred Spaces in Imperial Russia (2002) and Framing Russian Art: From Early Icons to Malevich (2011).

== Personal life ==
Milner-Gulland was born to a Scottish father, Laurence Harry "Hal" Milner-Gulland and an Australian mother, Nancy Ruth Bavin (the daughter of Thomas Bavin, former Premier of New South Wales). Milner-Gulland has been married to the artist Alison Taylor since 1966, and has three children (including E.J. Milner-Gulland), four grandchildren and two great-grandchildren.
