= Marsh Award for Conservation Biology =

The Marsh Award for Conservation Biology, established 1991, is an award run in partnership between the Zoological Society of London (ZSL) and the Marsh Charitable Trust that recognises an individual for his or her "contributions of fundamental science to the conservation of animal species and habitats".

== Recipients ==
- 1991 – Robert M. May
- 1992 – Derek A. Ratcliffe
- 1993 – Georgina M. Mace
- 1994 – Ian Newton
- 1995 – John Goss-Custard
- 1996 – Jeremy A. Thomas
- 1997 – Rhys E. Green
- 1998 – Peter S. Maitland
- 1999 – John Croxall
- 2000 – Andrew Balmford
- 2001 – E.J. Milner-Gulland
- 2002 – Callum Roberts
- 2003 – Stuart Pimm
- 2004 – Chris D. Thomas
- 2005 – William J. Sutherland
- 2006 – Sarah Wanless
- 2007 – Stuart Butchart
- 2008 – Isabelle M. Côté
- 2009 – Ana Rodrigues
- 2010 – Paul Donald
- 2011 – Jane Hill
- 2012 – Dave Goulson
- 2013 – Debbie Pain
- 2014 – Ben Collen
- 2015 – Stephen Redpath
- 2016 – Richard Griffiths
- 2017 – Susan Cheyne
- 2018 – Steffen Oppel
- 2020 - Michael W. Bruford
- 2021 - Rosie Woodroffe
- 2022 - Kate Jones
- 2023 - John Gittleman

== See also ==
- List of environmental awards
