= Patrícia Medici =

Brazilian conservation biologist

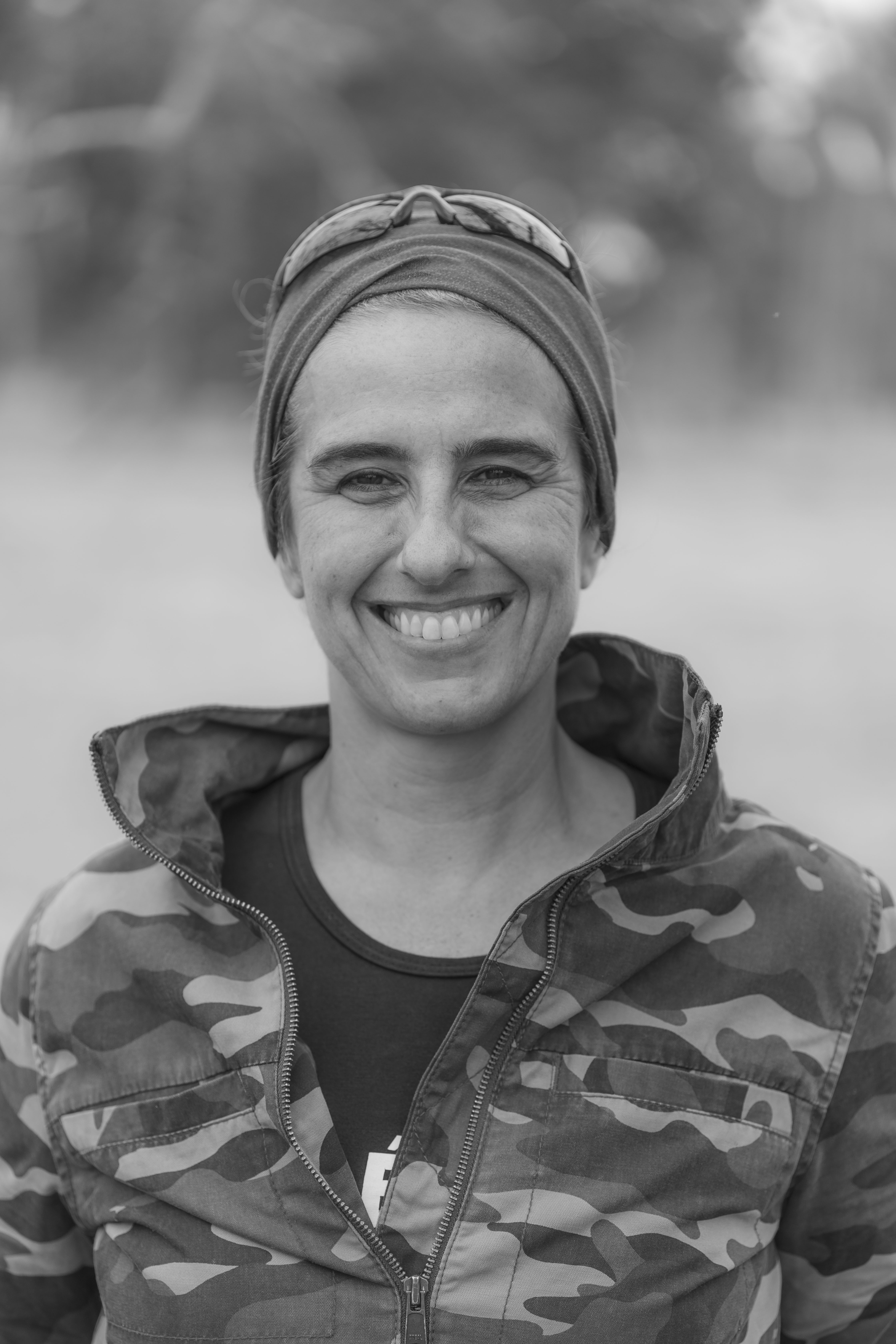
Patrícia Medici in 2019

Emilia Patrícia Medici is a Brazilian conservation biologist who focuses on tapirs. She is the founder of the Lowland Tapir Conservation Initiative. She has published peer-reviewed research on animal movements in the Anthropocene with conservation colleagues, and found that animals move less in human-influenced habitats. Her TED Talk on tapir conservation has been viewed over 1,400,000 times.

== Life ==
Medici's work has included promoting putting reflective lighting on tapirs so that drivers can better see them at night.

== Awards ==
- Future for Nature Award
- Harry Messel Conservation Leadership Award from the International Union for Conservation of Nature (2004)
- Research Prize from the Durrell Institute of Conservation and Ecology (2011)
- National Geographic Buffett Award for Leadership in Conservation (2019)
