= Ian Swingland =

British biologist and conservationist

- Born: Ian Richard Swingland; 2 November 1946 (age 79); Barnet, England, United Kingdom
- Occupations: Biodiversity; academia, business and charities
- Years active: 1968–present
- Criminal charges: Conspiracy to commit fraud by false representation

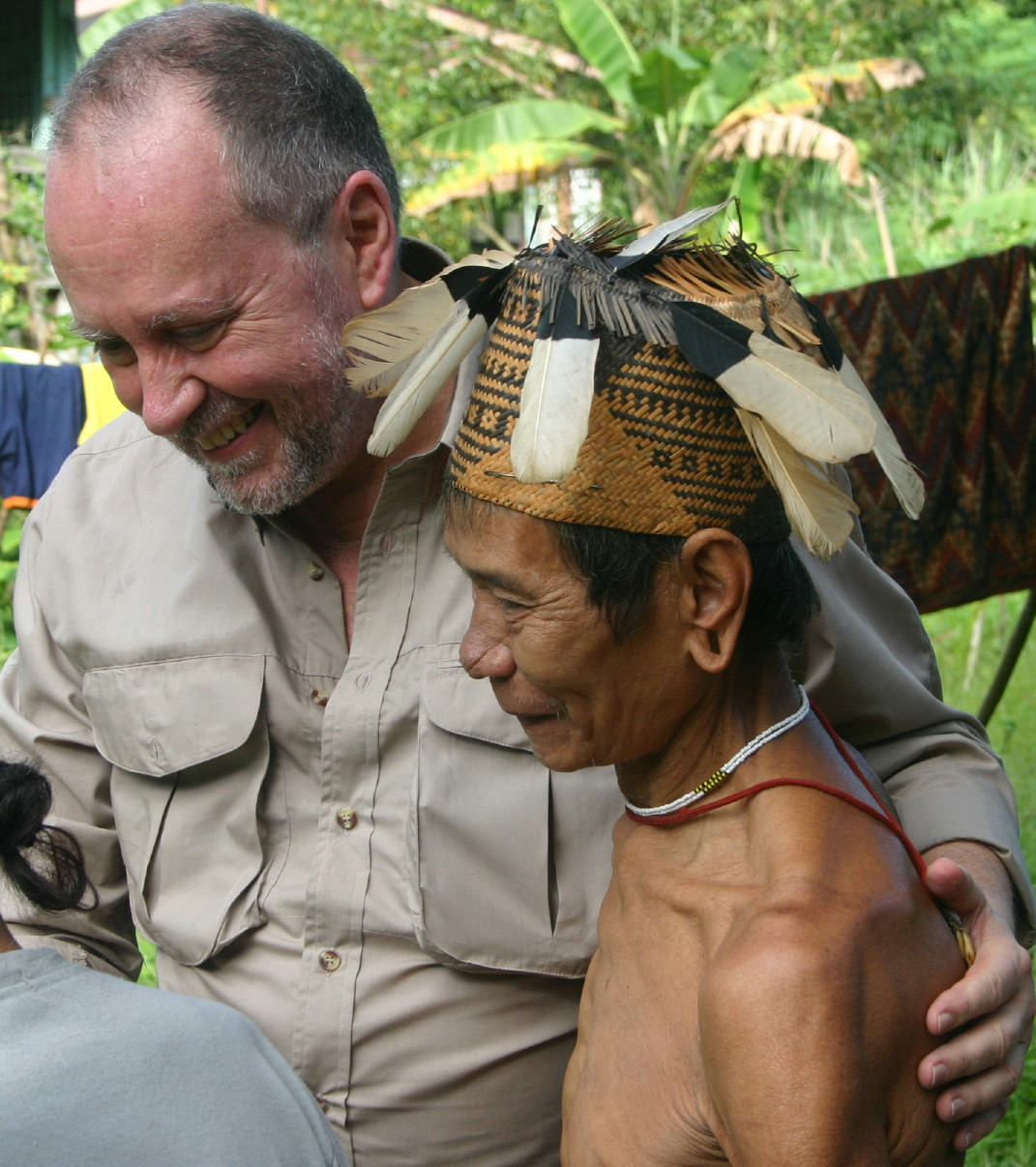

Ian Richard Swingland (born 2 November 1946) is a British conservationist. He founded DICE (Durrell Institute of Conservation and Ecology) at the University of Kent in 1989. While at DICE he served as director and was elected to the first chair in Conservation Biology in the United Kingdom. Swingland was convicted of conspiring to commit fraud by false representation in 2017.

== Early years and education ==
Swingland is the only child of Flora Mary (née Fernie), who worked as a senior lecturer in the Polytechnic of Central London, and Hugh Maurice Webb Swingland, an electrical engineer.

Swingland was educated at Haberdashers’ Aske’s Boys’ School, London, followed by London, Edinburgh and Oxford Universities.

At London University, he read zoology and social anthropology and published his first scientific paper on the location of memory in a vertebrate in Nature in 1969.

After working for Shell Research International for a short time, he took a PhD in ecology in the Forestry and Natural Resources Department at Edinburgh University on a Department for International Development Scholarship and subsequently worked as a research and management biologist in the Kafue National Park, Zambia, for the Government.

== Career ==
In 1974, Swingland joined the Oxford University Zoology Department to work on the giant tortoises of Aldabra Atoll, western Indian Ocean.

In 1979, he was appointed to the University of Kent to create their Natural Science Continuing Education programme and ten years later founded DICE, The Durrell Institute of Conservation and Ecology, a multi-disciplinary research and conservation training institute. The name was chosen in recognition of Swingland's friend, Gerald Durrell, and his commitment to conservation.

Swingland founded the Herpetological Conservation Trust in 1989 (renamed the Amphibian and Reptile Conservation Trust), an international NGO and the international journal *Biodiversity and Conservation* in 1992, the first multidisciplinary journal in biodiversity management and sustainable development.

He also co-founded a number of companies which apply business and market approaches to benefiting conservation, biodiversity and people on an integrated, sustainable and ethical basis and co‑founded, with Neil Wates and Sir Colin Spedding, the think‑tank RURAL (Responsible Use of Resources in Agriculture and on the Land) in 1980. One of these companies, Sustainable Forestry Management Limited, was incorporated in Bermuda in October 1999 and liquidated in 2011.

Swingland was a draftsman of part of the Convention on Biological Diversity concerning fair and equitable sharing of benefits (PrepComm UNEP Nairobi 1990) and created the International Union for Conservation of Nature’s Species Survival Commission Tortoise Specialist Group in 1981 which is now the Tortoise and Freshwater Turtle Specialist Group. He directed the First World Congress of Herpetology in 1989. He is also a co‑founder and former chair of the Rural Regeneration Unit, a social enterprise, and the Durrell Trust for Conservation Biology, the trust that was dedicated to supporting DICE. He has served on the RSPCA Council 1990–1995 and as chair of its Wildlife Committee 1985–1990. Since 1985 he has served on the Council of Fauna & Flora International and has been a board member of the Darwin Initiative. He was chair of the Apple and Pear Research Council from 1997, which became part of the Agriculture and Horticulture Development Board in 2003, and is a benefactor of Victoria University of Wellington, New Zealand and was an Ambassador to Galapagos Conservation Trust until 2019.

Swingland has been an advisor on conservation and biodiversity management to the World Bank, the Global Environment Facility, the Asian Development Bank, and the UK Government, and has been employed as a research and management biologist in the Kafue National Park, Zambia, helping to write the management plan; and the Sundarban Biodiversity Conservation Project in Bangladesh.

Swingland is director emeritus and former trustee of Earthwatch (1999–2009), and is a founding trustee, former chair and now Trust Patron of Operation Wallacea since 2010.

Swingland has been heavily involved with the Iwokrama International Centre for Rain Forest Conservation and Development, the largest biodiversity project belonging to the Commonwealth, and was appointed Chairman of the International Board of Trustees in 2002 by the President of Guyana and the Secretary‑General of the Commonwealth Secretariat under the patronage of the Prince of Wales.

He also advised China on integrated ecosystem management projects; its aim was to reduce land degradation, create alternative livelihoods, and conserve biodiversity using a market—not-donation approach.

== Awards and recognition ==
Swingland was made an honorary Doctor of Sciences by the University of Kent for his service to biodiversity conservation.

Swingland was appointed Officer of the Order of the British Empire (OBE) in the 2007 New Year Honours for services to conservation. The appointment was cancelled and annulled in November 2017.

== Criminal prosecution ==
Ian Swingland was involved with Carbon Research and Development Limited, a now defunct company incorporated in Mauritius on 21 March 2005, and stood trial (with others) on charges involving the facilitation of tax evasion between 2005 and 2008. At the end of the trial, which commenced on 20 September 2016 and lasted four months, he was acquitted on the principal charge. He was found guilty on 3 March 2017 of one count of conspiring to commit fraud by false representation, receiving a two-year sentence, suspended for 18 months at Southwark Crown Court on 10 March 2017.

Reporting restrictions relating to the various trials brought under the "Operation Amazon" investigation were maintained until 25 February 2019. On 30 September 2017, while remaining a benefactor, Swingland resigned as a director of The Wallacea Trust. On 30 November his name was erased from the register of members of the Order of the British Empire.

== Selected publications ==
- The Ecology of Animal Movement Swingland, IR, Greenwood, PG (editors). (Oxford: Oxford University Press, 1983) ISBN 0-19-857575-0
- Living in a Patchy Environment Shorrocks, B and Swingland, IR (editors). (Oxford and New York: Oxford University Press, 1990) Hardback ISBN 0-19-854591-6 Softback ISBN 978-0-19-854591-0
- Integrated Protected Area Management Walkey, M, Swingland, IR and Russell, S.(editors) (MA and Netherlands: Kluwer Academic Publishers, 1999) ISBN 0-412-80360-7
- Carbon, Biodiversity, Conservation and Income: An analysis of a free market approach to Land use change and forestry in Developing and Developed Countries. Swingland IR,. Bettelheim EC, Grace J, Ghillean T, Prance and Lindsay, Saunders S (compilers) Theme Issue for the Philosophical Transactions of the Royal Society 2002
- Capturing carbon and conserving biodiversity: the market approach Swingland IR (editor), (Royal Society-Earthscan, 2003) 392 pp. Hardback ISBN 978-1-85383-950-4, Softback 392 pp ISBN 978-1-85383-951-1
- CO_{2} e biodiversità: Un approccio integrato a favore del clima e del patrimonio naturale. Swingland I.R. (editor). (Edizioni Ambiente, Milano, Italy, 2004) 296 pp. ISBN 88-89014-19-9
- Integrated Wetland Management: Symposium of International Workshop on Integrated Wetlands Management. Niu Z., Swingland I.R., Lei G. (editors).(Asian Development Bank PRC-7021 & China Ocean Press 2012) In English 255pp, in Mandarin 183pp. Softback ISBN 978-7-5027-8414-0
