= Kate Jones (scientist) =

British biodiversity scientist (born 1972)

- Born: Katherine Elizabeth Jones; 1972 (age 53–54)
- Other name: Cocktail Kate
- Education: University of Leeds (BSc); University of Surrey (PhD)
- Known for: Bat Detective
- Scientific career
- Fields: Biodiversity; Macroecology; Evolution; Conservation
- Workplaces: University College London
- Thesis: Evolution of bat life-histories (1998)
- Website: www.katejones.org

Katherine Elizabeth Jones (born 1972) is a British biodiversity scientist, with a special interest in bats. She is Professor of Ecology and Biodiversity, and Director of the Biodiversity Modelling Research Group, at University College London. She is a past chair of the Bat Conservation Trust.

== Education ==
Jones graduated with a Bachelor of Science degree in Zoology from the University of Leeds in 1993 and with a Ph.D. from the University of Surrey in 1998.

== Research ==
Jones is interested in understanding how biodiversity is maintained and conserved globally. She won a 2008 Philip Leverhulme Award in Zoology (given to "outstanding young scholars … whose future contributions are held to be of correspondingly high promise") and holds a number of scientific advisory board positions for national and international conservation charities.

Jones has researched bats in Transylvania where she developed new ways of monitoring bat populations through sound.

Jones has been involved in a number of citizen science projects including Bat Detective and a phone related bat monitoring project. According to Google Scholar and Scopus her most cited papers have been published in Science and Nature.

== Honours and awards ==
Jones was awarded the Philip Leverhulme Prize in 2011. In 2022 she was awarded the Marsh Award for Conservation Biology by the Zoological Society of London and the Marsh Ecology Award from the British Ecological Society.

== Personal life ==
Jones is also known for her love of cocktails, which she discussed with Jim Al-Khalili on the BBC radio programme The Life Scientific.

In a Guardian feature on "Why more women should consider a career in science", Jones said:

Being a scientist helps me understand the amazing diversity and evolution of life and gives me freedom to answer questions that most interest me. This amazing job has taken me all over the world meeting people and wildlife I only imagined. Why on earth would you want to do anything else?
