= Red List Index =

Conservation status indicator

Red List Index (2019)

IUCN Red List categories: EX (Extinct); EW (Extinct in the Wild); CR (Critically Endangered); EN (Endangered); VU (Vulnerable); NT (Near Threatened); LC (Least Concern)

The Red List Index (RLI), based on the IUCN Red List of Threatened Species, is an indicator of the changing state of global biodiversity. It defines the conservation status of major species groups, and measures trends in extinction risk over time. By conducting conservation assessments at regular intervals, changes in the threat status of species in a taxonomic group can be used to monitor trends in extinction risk. RLIs have been calculated for birds and amphibians, using changes in threat status for species in each of the groups.

As well as taxonomic groups, RLIs can show trends in extinction risk according to biogeographic realm, habitat type, and dominant threat process.

Red List Index Core strength stated in "Biodiversity Indicators Based on Trends in Conservation Status: Strengths of the IUCN Red List Index" is due to its vast representation of species worldwide which allow for immediate action when a species is close to extinction on the index.

== Impact of Utilization ==
There are Marine Protected Areas or MPA in which Red List Index takes extra importance to utilize and monitor biodiversity pressures defined by the journal "Assessing worth of marine protected areas for the protection of threatened biodiversity using IUCN Red List Index and Red List Index. A pilot study in six Mediterranean areas". As stated in the journal, MPAs are designated to take actions such as providing protection of biodiversity, allocate resources from economic growth, increase knowledge and utilization of environmental programs on archeological/costal sites.

When looking at a glance it may appear to not be very important but history shows that when activities go unregulated it can massively swing a population in the area. As the journal "Ecological erosion and expanding extinction risk of sharks and rays" presents, the shark and ray Red List Index has diminished by 19% on the Red List index since the 1970s due to overfishing. To put it into a better perspective, the population of sharks were cut in half due to unchecked overfishing from the 1970s and that does not count future erosion of river and coastal waters that further caused damage to the population in future years.

== Sampled approach ==
Producing indices of change in extinction risk by comprehensively assessing whole species groups, while feasible for well studied groups with relatively few species, is not suitable for all taxonomic groups. Assessing every species in the larger and lesser known groups which comprise the majority of the world's biodiversity, such as fungi, invertebrates (particularly insects) and plants, is not practical.

The Red List Index (sampled approach) (SRLI) has been developed in order to determine the threat status and also trends of lesser-known and less charismatic species groups. It is a collaboration between IUCN members and is coordinated through the Institute of Zoology (IoZ), the research division of the Zoological Society of London (ZSL). The SRLI is based on a representative sample of species selected from taxonomic groups within animals (invertebrates and vertebrates), fungi and plants.

The SRLI is showcased in the journal "Application of the Red List Index at a national level for multiple species groups" by exclaiming that this approach is utilized to calculate in a taxonomic group without having to repeatedly scan through all of the species such as with plants there may be about 15,000 plant species referenced on the IUCN Red List.

Assessment of the selected species will provide baseline information on the current status of biodiversity. Reassessment at regular intervals will identify changes in threat status over time to provide a more broadly representative picture of biodiversity change.

== Applications ==
The aim is that the SRLI will aid in the production of a global biodiversity indicator capable of measuring whether the rate of biodiversity loss has been reduced. In addition, it will help to develop a better understanding of which taxonomic groups, realms or ecosystems are deteriorating the most rapidly, why species are threatened, where they are threatened, what conservation actions exist and which actions are needed. The aim is to provide policy makers, resource managers, scientists, educators, conservation practitioners and the general public with more thorough knowledge of biodiversity change and further tools with which to make informed decisions.

From an initial glance it would appear that the Red List index pinpointing species in Marine Protected Areas would dictate that researchers are creating trends to see if their efforts are effective, however it is not initially utilized for that purpose. As described in the research journal "Assessing worth of marine protected areas for the protection of threatened biodiversity using IUCN Red List Index and Red List Index. A pilot study in six Mediterranean areas" during the investigation of the data it was discovered that the Red List Index is utilized to consolidate all of the information into one conservation status for a species in a designated MPA rather than to track trends for an individual species risk of extinction.

When it comes to understanding ecosystems it also has been discovered that learning the natural trends of habitat development is beneficial through test results of a research journal called "Application of the Red List Index as an indicator of habitat change". As the journal states it can be utilized to showcase other factors that can impact a specific species to have a positive trend such as beetles having a positive trend in Forest and Rural areas due to the habitat being majorly unchanged in comparison to other habitats where they see a negative trend majorly.

In April 2002 at the Convention on Biological Diversity (CBD), 188 Nations committed themselves to actions to: "... achieve, by 2010, a significant reduction of the current rate of biodiversity loss at the global, regional and national levels..." The RLI has been adopted by the CBD as one of the indicators to measure progress towards this important target, and specifically to monitor changes in threat status of species.

A national Red List Index (RLI) spanning three decades (1990 to 2020) was calculated for Australia's birds, revealing that the national score fell from 0.927 to 0.896, dropping below the global avian RLI in 2020. This national application demonstrated that the index is highly sensitive to specific events, capturing both deteriorations from the 2019–2020 wildfires and measurable improvements from targeted conservation interventions like invasive predator eradications.

The Red List Index can also be disaggregated by specific taxonomic orders to evaluate and compare long-term trends in aggregate extinction risk. For instance, a global assessment of parrots (Psittaciformes) using the Red List Index between 1988 and 2012 revealed that parrots maintain a lower index score (0.825 in 2012) than other major avian groups, such as raptors (0.877), pigeons (0.868), and gamebirds (0.842), indicating a higher overall level of threat. Over that 25-year period, the RLI for parrots showed a consistently negative trend, demonstrating that localised conservation successes were continually outweighed by the number of parrot species being up-listed to higher threat categories.

== See also ==
- IUCN Red List
- International Union for the Conservation of Nature and Natural Resources (IUCN)
- Convention on Biological Diversity
- 2010 Biodiversity Indicators Partnership
- Millennium Ecosystem Assessment
- Institute of Zoology
- Zoological Society of London
- Living Planet Index
