= Isabelle M. Côté =

Canadian marine conservation biologist

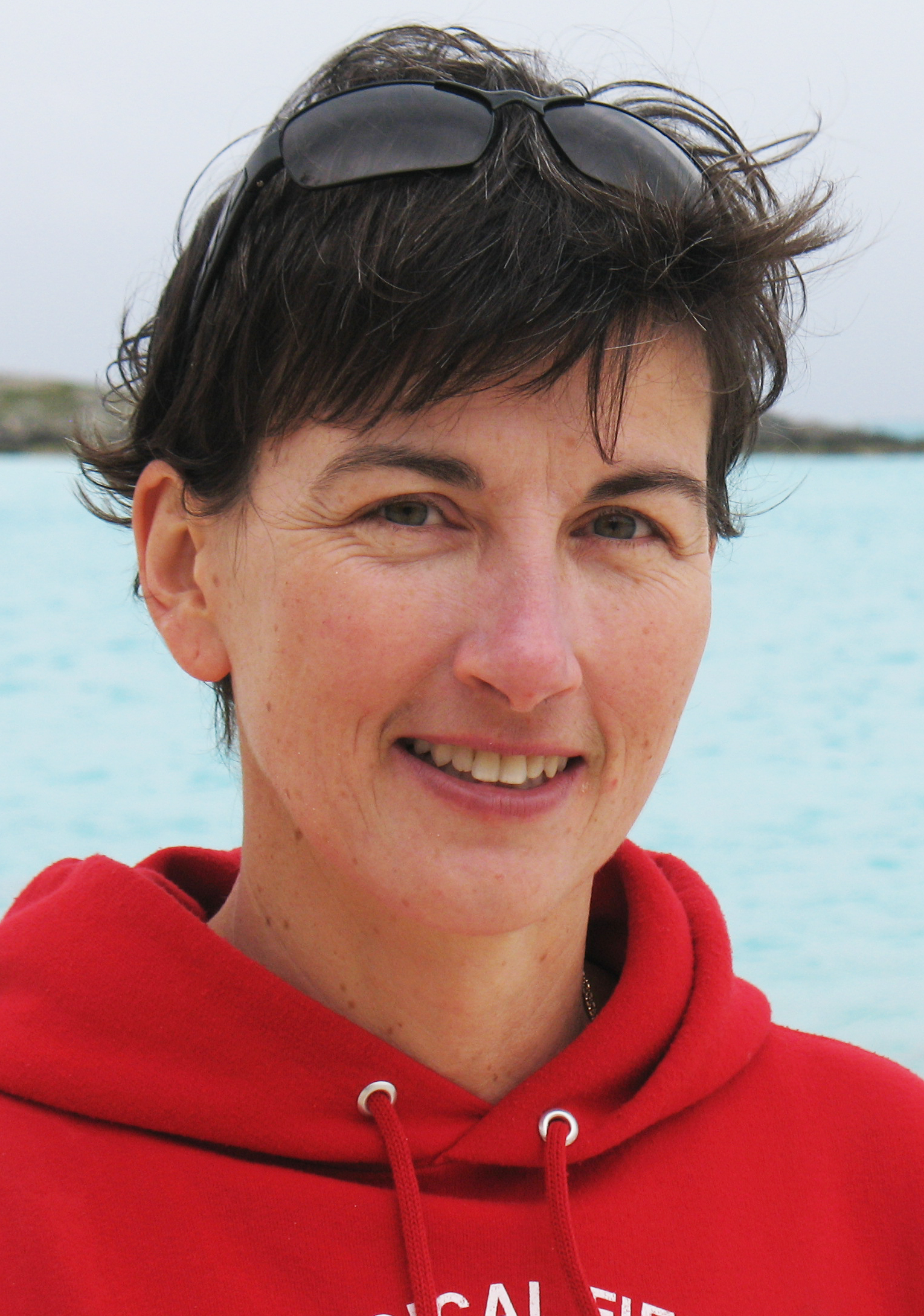
- Education: McGill University University of Alberta University of Toronto
- Scientific career
- Fields: Ecology; Coral Reef Ecology; Conservation

Isabelle M. Côté is a professor of marine ecology at Simon Fraser University in Canada.

== Life and education ==
Côté is from Montreal, Quebec. She received her B.Sc. in marine biology from McGill University in 1984, her M.Sc. in zoology from the University of Alberta in 1987, and her Ph.D. in behavioral ecology from the University of Toronto in 1993. In 2023 she was elected as a Fellow of the Royal Society of Canada. Her research is notable for its impact on coral reef conservation.

== Career ==
Côté pioneered the use of meta-analyses in marine conservation. Her research has addressed the extent of coral reef declines in the Caribbean at a regional level, and measured the effectiveness of marine protected areas at enhancing fish and their habitats. Côté and coauthors demonstrated that protected areas were not necessarily more resistant to climate change. Her recent research has focused on the dramatic invasion of Indo-Pacific lionfish throughout the Caribbean, with a focus on sub-tidal research.

Previously, she was a faculty member at the University of East Anglia in Norwich, UK.

Côté has published over 200 academic publications on behavioural ecology, coral reef ecology, and conservation, receiving over 20,000 citations, resulting in an h-index and i10-index of 67 and 200 respectively. Côté has spoken about different aspects of marine conservation for different media outlets, including CBC News.

== Awards and honors ==
- Murray A. Newman Award for significant contributions to advancing conservation and research efforts in BC and beyond (2008)
- Leopold Leadership Fellows by Stanford University's Stanford Woods Institute for the Environment (2015)
- Marsh Award for Conservation Biology by the Zoological Society of London for "contributions of fundamental science to the conservation of animal species and habitats" (2008)

== Publications ==
- 1995. IM Côté, R Poulin. "Parasitism and group size in social animals: a meta-analysis". Behavioral Ecology 6 (2), 159–165
- 2003. TA Gardner, IM Côté, JA Gill, A Grant, AR Watkinson. Long-term region-wide declines in Caribbean corals. Science 301 (5635), 958–960
- 2008. ES Darling, IM Côté. Quantifying the evidence for ecological synergies. Ecology Letters 11 (12), 1278–1286
- 2014. SJ Green, IM Côté. "Trait-based diet selection: prey behaviour and morphology predict vulnerability to predation in reef fish communities". Journal of Animal Ecology 83 (6), 1451–1460
- 2016. IM Côté, ES Darling, CJ Brown. "Interactions among ecosystem stressors and their importance in conservation". Proc. R. Soc. B 283 (1824), 20152592
- 2016. JA Schultz, RN Cloutier, IM Côté. "Evidence for a trophic cascade on rocky reefs following sea star mass mortality in British Columbia". PeerJ 4, e1980
- 2019. BR Howard, FT Francis, IM Côté, TW Therriault. "Habitat alteration by invasive European green crab (Carcinus maenas) causes eelgrass loss in British Columbia, Canada". Biol Invasions 21, 3607-3618
