= David Macdonald (biologist) =

Scottish zoologist and conservationist

- Born: David Whyte Macdonald; 1951 (age 74–75)
- Citizenship: United Kingdom
- Education: Wadham College, Oxford (BA) Balliol College, Oxford (DPhil) Lady Margaret Hall, Oxford (DSc)
- Awards: CBE; FRSE
- Scientific career
- Fields: Zoology, wildlife conservation
- Workplaces: University of Oxford
- Doctoral students: Rosie Woodroffe Alexandra Zimmermann Tucker Murphy Dominic D. P. Johnson
- Website: www.zoo.ox.ac.uk/people/professor-david-macdonald

David Whyte Macdonald CBE FRSE (born 1951) is a British zoologist and conservation biologist. He first became internationally known for his early research on red foxes, which led to award-winning documentary films and books, as well as contributions to wildlife conservation policy. He is best known as the founder of the Wildlife Conservation Research Unit (WildCRU) at the University of Oxford, established in 1986, which he directed for 35 years. Macdonald is a Senior Research Fellow of Lady Margaret Hall, Oxford with the Title of Distinction of Professor of Wildlife Conservation at the University of Oxford. He has been an active conservation biologist since graduating from Oxford in 1972, where he earned a BA (1972), MA (1973), DPhil (1977) and DSc (2004).

== Education and early career ==
Macdonald, the only son of Glaswegian parents, was educated at Wallop Prep School in Surrey, briefly at Emmanuel School in Glamorgan, and then at St Lawrence College in Kent. He read zoology at Wadham College, Oxford (1969–72), followed by a DPhil in animal behaviour in Niko Tinbergen’s research group, supervised by Hans Kruuk and H. N. Southern (1972–76). He subsequently became a Junior Research Fellow at Balliol College, Oxford (1976–79), following his father W. A. F. Macdonald (medicine, 1946–53). He served as the Ernest Cook Research Fellow (1979–84) and the Nuffield Research Fellow (1984–87) in the Department of Zoology at Oxford, before his appointment as Senior Research Fellow in Wildlife Conservation at Lady Margaret Hall in 1986.

== Career ==
Macdonald’s research philosophy has been to conduct original biological research that directly informs practical wildlife conservation and environmental management, thereby shaping policy and public debate on conservation issues. While his early work focused on red foxes, he has maintained a lifelong emphasis on carnivores, increasingly on felids.

He has published more than 1,500 papers in peer-reviewed journals. His most highly cited paper is "The ecology of carnivore social behaviour", published in Nature in 1983. He has written or edited more than two dozen books; recent works include A Very Short Introduction to Biodiversity Conservation (2023) and The Badgers of Wytham Woods: A Model for Behaviour, Ecology and Evolution (2022).

Although centred on carnivores, his research spans an unusually broad range of taxa, including mammals from 11 orders, as well as birds, reptiles, amphibians, fish, butterflies, moths and other invertebrates. His fieldwork has taken place in eight European, nine African, twelve Asian and six South American countries, and covers major themes in biodiversity conservation such as human–wildlife conflict, predator management, hunting, wildlife disease, epizootiology, wildlife trade, conservation geopolitics, landscape planning, invasive species, financial mechanisms, legislation, animal welfare and conservation ethics.

His recent focus includes the Connecting Landscapes Decision Support System, designed to integrate biodiversity conservation with economic development. In 2015 he was listed among the top three individuals in the BBC Wildlife Power List for those likely to make the greatest impact on wildlife in the coming decade. In 2023 he was named one of the two most productive conservation authors globally over the previous 20 years in human–wildlife conflict.

== Public understanding of science ==
Macdonald has been active in communicating biology and conservation to the public through films and books. His BBC2 documentary Night of the Fox introduced broadcast-quality infrared filming and was a finalist for the BAFTA Best Documentary Award in 1976. The accompanying book Running with the Fox won the Natural World Book of the Year Award in 1987.

His BBC1 film Meerkats United won the 1988 Wildscreen Award and, in a 1996 public vote, was named the "Best Natural History Film Ever Made". Its sequel, One for All, All for One, produced for National Geographic Explorer, was a finalist at the 1989 Animal Behavior Society Film Festival. His seven-part BBC series The Velvet Claw (1992) explored the natural history of carnivores and was published as a companion book.

The first edition of his Encyclopaedia of Mammals (1984) sold about 500,000 copies, and the 2009 third edition is widely used as a reference work. His children’s book Vulpina: The Story of a Fox (1977) received positive reviews, and his travel book Expedition to Borneo (1982) was reissued in 2007. His general-interest books have been translated into multiple European and Asian languages. His research in Southeast Asia also informed the educational computer game Unseen Empire.

== Public service ==
In the United Kingdom, Macdonald has served on the boards of English Nature and Natural England, where he was the founding Chair of the Science Advisory Committee. He chaired the UK government’s Darwin Advisory Committee for a decade, and was founding Chair of the IUCN/SSC Canid Specialist Group for 25 years, becoming an Emeritus Fellow in 2005. He has served on the boards of numerous conservation organisations including WWF-UK (Emeritus Fellow), Fauna & Flora International, the Zoological Society of London (Vice President), the Wildfowl & Wetlands Trust, the RSPB, the RSPCA (Vice President) and The Wildlife Trusts (Vice President). Internationally, he has advised the School of Wildlife Conservation at the African Leadership University in Kigali.

He is currently Chair of Action for Conservation, Chair of Lion Landscapes (working in Kenya, Tanzania and the UK), and a trustee of Chester Zoo and the Oxfordshire Local Nature Partnership.

== Awards and honours ==
Macdonald’s doctoral thesis, The Behavioural Ecology of the Red Fox, received the T. H. Huxley Prize of the Zoological Society of London in 1978. He later received the Dawkins Prize in 2005, the Merriam Prize in 2006, The Mammal Society of Great Britain’s Gold Medal in 2007, and the Zoological Society of London’s Silver Medal in 2009. He was elected a Fellow of the Royal Society of Edinburgh in 2008.

He received the joint RSPCA and British Society of Animal Science award for work on wild animal welfare in 2012 and was elected an Honorary Life Member of the American Society of Mammalogists in 2019. In 2025, he was awarded the Linnean Medal.

Macdonald has held visiting and honorary positions at Cornell University, the University of Plymouth, the University of Liverpool, and Imperial College London. He is a Fellow of the Royal Geographical Society, the Zoological Society of London, the Royal Society of Biology, and the Linnean Society of London. He was appointed Commander of the Order of the British Empire (CBE) in 2010.

== Bibliography ==
- Macdonald, D.W.; Service, Katrina M., eds. (28 November 2006). Key Topics in Conservation Biology. Oxford: Blackwell Publishing. p. 307. ISBN 1-4051-2249-8. (Part 2 published 2007)
- Macdonald, David W.; Sillero-Zubiri, Claudio, eds. (16 September 2004). Biology and Conservation of Wild Canids. Oxford University Press. ISBN 0-19-851555-3.
- Macdonald, David W.; Tattersall, Fran (20 May 2002). The State of Britain's Mammals. People's Trust for Endangered Species. ISBN 0-9540043-2-9.
- Macdonald, David W.; Tattersall, Fran; Barrett, P. (illustrator) (4 April 2001). Britain's Mammals: The Challenge for Conservation. People's Trust for Endangered Species. p. 295. ISBN 0-9540043-1-0.
- Macdonald, David W.; Norris, Sasha (30 August 2006). The Encyclopedia of Mammals (2 ed.). Facts on File. p. 930. ISBN 978-0-8160-6494-6.
- Macdonald, David Whyte; Barrett, Priscilla (26 December 2001). Mammals of Europe. Princeton Field Guides. Princeton University Press. pp. 312. ISBN 0-691-09160-9.
- Macdonald, David W.; Strachan, Rob (1999). The Mink and the Water Vole: Analyses for Conservation. Environment Agency. p. 161. ISBN 0-9529371-2-3.
- Sillero-Zubiri, Claudio; Macdonald, David, eds. (1997). The Ethiopian Wolf: Status Survey and Conservation Action Plan. International Union for Conservation of Nature. p. 123. ISBN 2-8317-0407-3.
- Macdonald, David W. (6 November 1995). The Encyclopedia of Mammals. Andromeda Oxford. p. 895. ISBN 1-871869-62-5.
- Macdonald, David Whyte; Barrett, Priscilla (February 1999). Mammals of Britain and Europe. Collins Field Guides. Collins. p. 312. ISBN 0-00-219779-0.
- Macdonald, David Whyte (June 1993). The Velvet Claw: Natural History of the Carnivores. BBC Consumer Publishing. pp. 256. ISBN 0-563-20844-9.
- Macdonald, David Whyte (31 July 1980). Rabies and Wildlife. Oxford University Press. p. 151. ISBN 0-19-857576-9.
- Ginsberg, Joshua Ross; Macdonald, David W., eds. (1990). Foxes, Wolves, Jackals and Dogs: An Action Plan for the Conservation of Canids. Switzerland: International Union for Conservation of Nature. p. 116. ISBN 2-88032-996-5.
- Passanisi, Warner C.; Macdonald, David W. (1990). The Fate of Controlled Feral Cat Colonies. Animal Welfare. ISBN 0-900767-67-7.
- Macdonald, David Whyte (1989). Running with the Fox. Unwin Hyman. p. 224. ISBN 0-04-440419-0.
- Macdonald, David W., ed. (1985). The Complete Book of the Dog. Pelham. ISBN 0-7207-1606-3.
- Brown, Richard E.; Macdonald, David W., eds. (1985). Social Odours in Mammals. Vol. 1. Oxford University Press. ISBN 0-19-857546-7.
- Brown, Richard E.; Macdonald, David W., eds. (1985). Social Odours in Mammals. Vol. 2. Oxford University Press. ISBN 0-19-857617-X.
- Macdonald, David W., ed. (1984). The Encyclopedia of Mammals. Vol. 1. HarperCollins. ISBN 0-04-500028-X.
- Macdonald, David W., ed. (1984). Encyclopaedia of Mammals. Vol. 2. Allen & Unwin. ISBN 0-04-500030-1.
- Macdonald, David Whyte (1 April 1982). Expedition to Borneo: the search for Proboscis monkeys and other creatures. Dent. pp. 180. ISBN 0-460-04517-2.
- Macdonald, David Whyte (July 1980). Rabies and Wildlife: A Biologist's Perspective. Oxford University Press. pp. 151. ISBN 0-19-857567-X.
- Macdonald, David Whyte (1977). Vulpina: The Story of a Fox. Collins. p. 77. ISBN 0-00-195229-3.
