= A Fortress of Grey Ice =

2003 novel by J. V. Jones

- Original hardcover book cover from 2003
- Author: J. V. Jones
- Language: English
- Series: Sword of Shadows
- Genre: Fantasy
- Publisher: Tor Books
- Publication date: 1 August 2003
- Publication place: United States
- Media type: Print (hardback)
- Pages: 672
- ISBN: 0-7653-0633-6
- OCLC: 51969173
- Dewey Decimal: 813/.54 21
- LC Class: PS3560.O4874 F67 2003
- Preceded by: A Cavern of Black Ice
- Followed by: A Sword from Red Ice

A Fortress of Grey Ice is a fantasy novel by British writer J. V. Jones, the second book in the Sword of Shadows series. It follows A Cavern of Black Ice and is followed by A Sword from Red Ice and Watcher of the Dead.

The novel focuses on multiple characters and plotlines. One of the large ones is Raif, who becomes disenchanted with his position in life. Abandoned by friends, feeling he has nothing, he goes wandering, only to join up with a new group called the Maimed Men.

== Plot summary ==
A Fortress of Grey Ice represents a greater division of storylines than was present in the first book. The novel opens rather dramatically with new characters and settings, then moves quickly to Ash March's abrupt and covert departure from Raif in order to join the Sull. Left with the Listener, Raif finds himself alone, now abandoned by clan and friend, cut off from everyone and everything that he loves. Embittered and resentful of the lore that claims him as Watcher of the Dead, Raif will wander the edge of the Want until he finds the only group willing to accept an outcast and renegade, the outlaw Maimed Men. Elsewhere, Ash, already leagues away from Raif, will become initiated into the mysterious blood lettings of the Sull, all the while riding in haste to reach the safety of the Sull lands, guarded by her two Far Riders and pursued by the maeraith she has been unintentionally released.
