= Amy Dickman =

Wildlife conservationist

Amelia Jane Dickman is Professor of Wildlife Conservation and Director of WildCRU at the University of Oxford, Kaplan Senior Research Fellow at Pembroke College, Oxford and joint CEO of Lion Landscapes. She is best known for her leadership of the Ruaha Carnivore Project, seeking to improve conservation outcomes for lions and other carnivores in the Ruaha National Park of Tanzania. She is known for her views on the importance of scientific and local community input into discussions around the continued importance of trophy hunting for the conservation of African landscapes.

== Education ==
Dickman completed her undergraduate education at the University of Liverpool in zoology. On graduation she joined WildCRU to work on cheetahs in Namibia before undertaking an M.Sc. on the determinants of human-carnivore conflict in Tanzania, for which she was awarded a distinction. She continued related work at University College London and the Zoological Society of London on a project supervised by Prof. Sarah Durant & Prof. Katharine Homewood, being awarded in her Ph.D. in 2009 for a thesis entitled "Key determinants of conflict between people and wildlife, particularly large carnivores, around Ruaha National Park, Tanzania".

== Career ==
After completing her PhD, Dickman returned to WildCRU in 2009, on a five year Kaplan Research Fellowship at Pembroke College, Oxford. She founded the Ruaha Carnivore Project during this period, and most recently Lion Landscapes. She is a founder member of Pride Lion Alliance. She is a National Geographic Explorer. Since 2001 she has been a member of the International Union for Conservation of Nature (IUCN) Species Survival Commission's Cat Specialist Group and African Lion Working Group. She is an associate editor of the Journal of Applied Ecology and has published over 90 peer-reviewed research papers, primarily on carnivore behaviour and conservation.

== Honours and awards ==
- 2011: Rabinowitz-Kaplan Award for the Next Generation in Wild Cat Conservation
- 2016: St Louis Zoo Conservation Award
- 2018: Cincinnati Zoo Wildlife Conservation Award

She was also a finalist for the 2014 Tusk Conservation Award
