= A Cavern of Black Ice =

1999 novel by J. V. Jones

- Author: J. V. Jones
- Language: English
- Series: Sword of Shadows
- Genre: Fantasy
- Publisher: Aspect
- Publication date: 1999 March 30
- Publication place: United States
- Media type: Print (hardback)
- Pages: 736
- ISBN: 978-0-446-52414-8
- OCLC: 39456030
- Dewey Decimal: 813/.54 21
- LC Class: PS3560.O4874 C38 1999
- Followed by: A Fortress of Grey Ice

A Cavern of Black Ice is a fantasy novel by British writer J. V. Jones, the first book in the Sword of Shadows series. It is followed by A Fortress of Grey Ice, A Sword from Red Ice and Watcher of the Dead.

== Plot summary ==
The story begins with a woman named Tarissa giving birth to a girl outside the city Spire Vanis. The girl, Ash March (possibly the daughter of Jack, from the Book of Words), is taken in by Penthero Iss, Spire Vanis's Surlord (a supreme ruler). After discovering that she will soon be moved to more prison-like quarters by the supposedly benevolent Surlord, she escapes.

The book also relates the tale of a young clansman of the Blackhail clan named Raif Sevrance. Raif and his brother, Drey, return from hunting one morning to discover their party has been slain. After dispensing final rites to their clansmen, the brothers return home to find the foster son of the chief, Mace Blackhail relating a different version of the tale implicating Clan Bludd in the death of their friends and family. Mace becomes chief of Clan Blackhail through various acts of treachery and declares war on Clan Bludd; Raif realises that Mace is lying, but no one else who speaks against Mace lives to tell the tale. Raif is forced by social pressure in a raid on what Mace says is a Clan Bludd battle party; it instead contains the (innocent) family of Vaylo, chief of Clan Bludd. Refusing Mace's orders to kill these innocents, Raif flees and is exiled from his clan for disobeying orders.

His uncle, Angus Lok, takes him to Spire Vanis. There, Angus and Raif rescue Ash from the Surlord's soldiers and flee the city, deciding to travel to another city called Ille Glaive. Along the way, Marafice Eye "the Knife", Iss's leading general, pursues them with some soldiers and a sorcerer called Sarga Veys. Most of the soldiers are lost as they follow Ash onto the ice of a lake, and subsequently drown, though Veys uses magic to escape and the Knife also makes it out. Once in Ille Glaive, Angus, Ash and Raif meet with Heritas Cant, another sorcerer. Cant explains Ash's abilities to reach the Blind, resting place of all manner of dark creatures sealed away in ancient history. Angus, Ash, and Raif then proceed northward to the Cavern of Black Ice, where Ash can get rid of her abilities as a Reach.

As the group heads north, they become captured by Clan Bludd, who have recently taken over a place they stop in. Raif is beaten severely for days. Vaylo fears Ash because of her connection to Iss, and contacts the Surlord to return her (we do not discover what happens to Angus). Ash forces Vaylo to postpone the execution of Raif, which allows his escape during a raid by Clan Blackhail. Drey, present at the raid, allows Raif to escape. The Knife attempts to rape Ash. She awakes before this occurs and unleashes the dark power within her, killing all but Veys and the Knife once more.

Ash again travels towards the Cavern of Black Ice and re-meets Raif. Eventually, after a cold and difficult journey with the help of two mysterious "Sull" (a more advanced culture described earlier in the book), they arrive at the Cavern of Black Ice where Ash finally discharges her powers.
