= Jeanneney Rabearivony =

- Education: University of Antananarivo
- Scientific career
- Fields: Ecology, Herpetology
- Thesis: Bioecology and Conservation of Chameleons within Riparian Habitats: Case of eastern rainforests of Madagascar (2013)

Jeanneney Rabearivony is a Malagasy ecologist and herpetologist.

== Life and research ==
Rabearivony grew up in rural Madagascar, and spent much of his childhood in the forest. The familiarity with the forest made him keenly aware of its disappearance, and set him on the path to work in environmental conservation.

Rabearivony received his MSc in Conservation Biology from the Durrell Institute of Conservation and Ecology (DICE), and a Diplome d'Etude Approffondies (DEA) in Ecology and Environmental studies from the University of Antananarivo in 1999. Thereafter he conducted his PhD on chameleon ecology and conservation at the University of Antananarivo, finishing his studies in 2013.

Rabearivony joined the WWF in July 2009 as manager of the Holistic Forest Conservation Project (PHCF) in Andapa, after being manager of humid zones for the Peregrine Fund. In this role, he works closely with local people to gain their perspectives and resource needs, helping to devise management plans that suit their requirements. He considers it imperative that the authorities managing Madagascar's forests and waters spend time in the field, in order to understand their role and the needs of the rural peoples of Madagascar, and has advocated for the coupling of local resource management with socio-economic engagement in order to improve the effectiveness of biodiversity protection.

Currently, Rabearivony is Dean of the Faculty of Sciences of the University of Antsiranana.
