= Debbie Pain =

Conservation biologist and ecotoxicologist

Debbie J Pain
- Education: Wye College, University of London; University of Oxford
- Scientific career
- Fields: bird conservation; ecotoxicology

Debbie Pain is a conservation biologist and ecotoxicologist working on endangered birds around the world. Since 1988 she has led projects into reversing the decline in several species through research, practical and policy measures at the Royal Society for the Protection of Birds and Wildlife and Wetlands Trust.

== Scientific career ==
Pain worked from 1988 on ecotoxicology at Station Biologique de la Tour du Valat in the Camargue, France, and from 1992 was employed in the research department of the Royal Society for the Protection of Birds. She initiated and led the international research section. In 2008 she became Director of Conservation for the Wildlife and Wetlands Trust, leaving in 2018. She has been an Honorary Research Fellow in the Department of Zoology at Cambridge University since 2018 and an Honorary Professor in the School of Biological Sciences at the University of East Anglia since 2019.

While with the RSPB she was their first international research biologist and then formed and managed an international research team that collaborated within BirdLife. She led projects in the early 2000s into causes of decline in the numbers of white-backed and Indian vultures in India. She also led research into the effects of agriculture on birds, the value of islands that can be cleared of predators and the consequences for birds of climate change.

During her time with the WWT she increased its role in international conservation. This included multinational programmes for recovery of the critically endangered spoon-billed sandpiper and the madagascar pochard. She also continued her research and policy work to reduce lead poisoning of wild birds from ammunition sources. The use of lead shot over wetlands and SSSIs in the countries of UK has been legally restricted from 1999 onwards and this has led to a voluntary transition to lead-free shot for live quarry shooting in the UK by 2025. Professor Pain is currently self-employed.

== Awards ==
In 2013 she received the Marsh Award for Conservation Biology from the Zoological Society of London. In 2015 Pain was included as one of the 50 most influential conservation heroes in the Wildlife Power List of the BBC Wildlife Magazine.

== Education and early life ==
Pain became keen on birds at the age of seven, inspired by a teacher while at junior school in her home town of Ramsgate. She was first in her family to go to university and studied environmental chemistry at Wye College, University of London followed by research into the biochemistry of lead poisoning from ammunition sources in birds during her doctorate at Oxford University.

== Publications ==
Pain is the author or co-author of over 115 scientific publications, including 3 books. They include:

- Donald, P.F., Collar, N.J., Marsden, S.J. & Pain, D.J. 2013. Facing Extinction: The world's rarest birds and the race to save them. Second Edition. Christopher Helm, Bloomsbury Publishing plc., London 320 pp.
- Hole, D. G., Huntley, B., Arinaitwe, J., Butchart, S. H. M., Collingham, Y. C., Fishpool, L. D. C., Pain, D. J. and Willis, S. G., 2011. Toward a Management Framework for Networks of Protected Areas in the Face of Climate Change. Conservation Biology 25(2): 305-315. No.Doi:10.1111/J.15231739.2010.01633.X
- Pain, D.J., Cromie, R.L., Newth, J., Brown, M.J., Crutcher, E., Hardman, L.H., Hurst, L., Mateo, R., Meharg, A.A., Moran, A.C., Raab, A., Taggart, M.A. & Green, R.E. 2010. Potential Hazard to Human Health from Exposure to Fragments of Lead Bullets and Shot in the Tissues of Game Animals. PLoS ONE 5(4):e10315.doi:10.1371/journal.pone.0010315
- Norris, K & Pain, D.J. (Eds.). 2002. Conserving Bird Biodiversity: General Principles and their Application. Cambridge University Press, Conservation Biology 7. Cambridge University Press. 337 pp.
- Green, R.E., Newton, I., Shultz, S., Cunningham, A.A., Gilbert, M., Pain, D.J., & Prakash, V.. 2004. Diclofenac poisoning as a cause of vulture population declines across the Indian subcontinent. J. Appl. Ecol. 41: 793-800.
- Prakash, V., Pain, D.J., Cunningham, A.A., Donald, P.F., Prakash, N., Verma, A., Gargi, R., Sivakumar, S., Rahmani, A. R. 2003. Catastrophic collapse of Indian white-backed Gyps bengalensis and long-billed Gyps indicus vulture populations. Biol. Cons. 109(3): 381-390.
- Donald, P.D., Pisano, G., Rayment, M.D. & Pain, D.J. 2002. The Common Agricultural Policy, EU enlargement and the conservation of Europe's farmland birds. Agricult. Ecosyst. Environ., 89: 167-179.
- Pain, D., A. Sánchez, A.A. Meharg 1998. The Doñana Ecological Disaster: contamination of World Heritage estuarine marsh ecosystem with acidified pyrite mine waste. Sci. Total Environ. 222: 45-54.
- Pain, D.J. 1996. Lead in waterfowl. Chapter 10 pages 251-264 In: W.N. Beyer, G.H. Heinz and A.W. Redmon (Eds.) Environmental Contaminants in Wildlife: interpreting tissue concentrations. SETAC CRC Lewis Publishers, Boca Raton.
