= William J. Sutherland =

Conservation biologist

William J. Sutherland CBE FRS
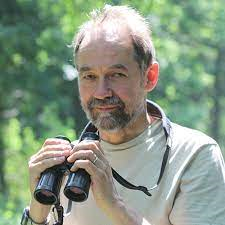
- Born: 27 April 1956 (age 70)
- Education: University of East Anglia (BSc); Liverpool Polytechnic (PhD)
- Known for: President of the British Ecological Society; Creator of ConservationEvidence.com
- Spouse: Nicola Jane Crockford
- Children: 2 daughters
- Awards: Distinguished Service Award, Society for Conservation Biology, 2013; Sir John Burnett Memorial Lecture Medal, 2013
- Scientific career
- Fields: Conservation Biology
- Workplaces: University of Cambridge
- Thesis: Oystercatchers and cockles : a predatory-prey study (1980)
- Doctoral advisor: William G. Hale

William James Sutherland CBE FRS (born 27 April 1956) is the Director of Research at the University of Cambridge Department of Zoology, and was previously the Miriam Rothschild Professor of Conservation Biology. He has been the president of the British Ecological Society. He has been a Fellow of St Catharine's College, Cambridge since 2008. In 2025, he was elected to the American Philosophical Society.

== Research ==
Sutherland's research interests largely involve predicting the consequences of environmental change. He is known for his research on integrating science and policy particularly in the field of evidence-based conservation. Over the last three decades, his research has spanned several disciplines. Two of his key contributions have been the horizon scanning exercises to identify future priority issues and the 100 important questions in various disciplines (ecology, poverty prevention, global agriculture and food amongst others. He has also worked extensively on bird population ecology and the biodiversity impacts of agriculture. He has been cited 23,955 times and has an i10-index of 277.

== Research career ==
Sutherland was awarded the Natural Environment Research Council postdoctoral fellowship to join Wolfson College, Oxford in 1980–82. After completing his post-doctoral research he joined the School of Environmental Sciences at the University of East Anglia in 1983 and went on to hold a professorship in Biology from 1996–2006 in the School of Biological Sciences. He was also a trustee of Fauna & Flora International from 1998 to 2006, and the President of the British Ecological Society from 2013-2015.

== Honours and awards ==
- Scientific Medal, Zoological Society of London, 1997;
- Marsh Award for Ecology, British Ecological Society, 2001;
- Marsh Award for Conservation Biology, Zoological Society of London, 2005;
- Ecological Engagement Award, British Ecological Society, 2012;
- Distinguished Service Award, Society for Conservation Biology, 2013;
- Sir John Burnett Memorial Lecture Medal, 2013
- ECI Prize, 2023
- International Cosmos Prize, 2024

Sutherland was appointed Commander of the Order of the British Empire (CBE) in the 2021 Birthday Honours for services to evidence-based conservation., and a Fellow of the Royal Society (FRS) in 2023.

== Books ==
He has authored three books: Transforming Conservation: A Practical Guide to Evidence and Decision Making, The Conservation Handbook and From Individual Behaviour to Population Ecology. Additionally, he has also edited the following books: Managing Habitats for Conservation, Ecological Census Techniques, Behaviour and Conservation, Conservation Science and Action and Bird Ecology, Conservation: a Handbook of Techniques and Transforming Conservation- A Practical Guide to Evidence and Decision Making, He has also co-authored the summaries on amphibian, bird, bee and farmland conservation,

A gratis book scheme that he established has given away more than 5,000 books to 137 countries.
