= Claudio Sillero-Zubiri =

Argentinian zoologist

Claudio Sillero-Zubiri is an Argentine-born British zoologist. He is a Professor of Conservation Biology at Oxford University's WildCRU, the Wildlife Conservation Research Unit, and Bill Travers Fellow at Lady Margaret Hall. He is the Chair of the IUCN/SSC Canid Specialist Group, and Chief Scientist of the Born Free Foundation. He is internationally recognized for his work with carnivore conservation, and in particular the endangered Ethiopian wolf (Canis simensis).

He studied at the Universidad Nacional de La Plata, then obtained his Ph.D. at Oxford University in 1994 with a study on the behavioural ecology of the Ethiopian wolf. Academic interests are the behavioural ecology of carnivores, conservation biology, population biology and disease dynamics, with a particular interest in the Canidae.

His work includes the conservation of endangered species, protected areas management, and wildlife surveys for 35 years spanning four continents. In 1998 he received the Whitley Award for Animal Conservation from the Royal Geographical Society for his work in Ethiopia.

Becoming increasingly involved in the relationships between protected areas and their surrounding rural communities, he is now working with biodiversity conservation policies and practices, particularly in South America, India and Ethiopia.

His work with the IUCN Canid Specialist Group began in 1995 assisting with various conservation programmes and coordinating the Ethiopian Wolf Conservation Programme (EWCP). He is the Chair of the Canid Specialist Group, and Editor of the Canid Biology and Conservation journal. He is also active in several other IUCN Specialist Groups.

Prof Sillero is frequently a keynote speaker at the annual Wildlife Conservation Network expo.

== Bibliography ==
- Biology and Conservation of Wild Canids David W. Macdonald (editor), Claudio Sillero-Zubiri (editor) (Oxford University Press, 2004) ISBN 0-19-851555-3
- The Ethiopian Wolf: Status Survey and Conservation Action Plan Claudio Sillero-Zubiri (editor), David MacDonald (editor) (IUCN The World Conservation Union, 1997) ISBN 2-8317-0407-3
- The Wolf Watchers (Born Free Wildlife Books) Alison Hood, Claudio Sillero-Zubiri (Templar Publishing, 1997) ISBN 1-898784-71-X children's book
- People and Wildlife - Conflict Resolution Manuals several human-wildlife conflict manuals co-authored by Claudio Sillero-Zubiri (pdf)
- Mammalian Species Canis simensis by Claudio Sillero-Zubiri and Dada Gottelli (The American Society of Mammalogists, 1994) (pdf)
