= E. J. Milner-Gulland =

Conservation biologist

- Born: 3 June 1967; Cuckfield
- Education: New College, Imperial College London
- Father: Robin Milner-Gulland
- Awards: Royal Society Wolfson Fellowship (2008); Marsh Award for Conservation Biology (2001); Marsh Ecology Award (2011)
- Academic career
- Fields: Conservation biology
- Institutions: Imperial College London (1999–2015); University of Warwick (1994–1998); University of Oxford (2015–)
- Thesis: The exploitation of certain large mammals for trade : the implications for management
- Doctoral advisor: John Beddington

Dame Eleanor Jane Milner-Gulland DBE (born 3 June 1967) is the Tasso Leventis Professor of Biodiversity in the Department of Biology at the University of Oxford, and director of the Interdisciplinary Centre for Conservation Science. She is an expert on understanding and influencing human behaviour to reduce biodiversity loss, on enabling businesses to improve their environmental and social sustainability, and on controlling the illegal wildlife trade. She is particularly known for her work on the ecology and conservation of the Saiga Antelope.

== Early life and education ==
Milner-Gulland was born on 3 June 1967 in Cuckfield, Sussex. She is the elder daughter of the renowned Russian scholar Robin Milner-Gulland and the artist Alison Milner-Gulland. She completed her undergraduate education at New College, Oxford in Pure and Applied Biology. She then went to Imperial College London to complete a PhD in conservation biology supervised by John Beddington. Her thesis was entitled The exploitation of certain large mammals for trade: the implications for management which she submitted in 1991.

== Career ==
After completing her PhD, Milner-Gulland became a junior research fellow at New College, Oxford. In 1994, she became a lecturer in mathematical ecology at the University of Warwick. In 1998, she moved back to Imperial College, where she stayed until 2015. In 2007, she was appointed Professor of Conservation Science. In 2015 she became the Tasso Leventis Professor of Biodiversity at the University of Oxford and a fellow of Merton College. In 2019 she became an official fellow of Parks College (later renamed Reuben College) where she was Theme Lead for Environmental Change. However, she moved back to Merton College in 2021.

Milner-Gulland is a conservation scientist whose work is at the interface of social and biological systems. She is the founder and chair of the Saiga Conservation Alliance and has launched a number of initiatives which aim to change the real-world conversation around conservation, including the Conservation Hierarchy approach to meeting a global vision of restoring nature, the Conservation Optimism movement and the Alliance of Nature Positive Universities. She is the Chair of the UK Government's Darwin Expert Committee and a Trustee of the UK WWF. In 2015, Milner-Gulland became a Pew Fellow of Marine Conservation. She is also a trustee of the Durrell Wildlife Conservation Trust.

== Honours and awards ==
Milner-Gulland was appointed Dame Commander of the Order of the British Empire (DBE) in the 2023 Birthday Honours for services to international conservation.

- Marsh Award for Conservation Biology (2001)
- Royal Society Wolfson Research Merit Award (2008)
- Society for Conservation Biology Distinguished Service Award (2019)
