= WildCRU =

English research unit

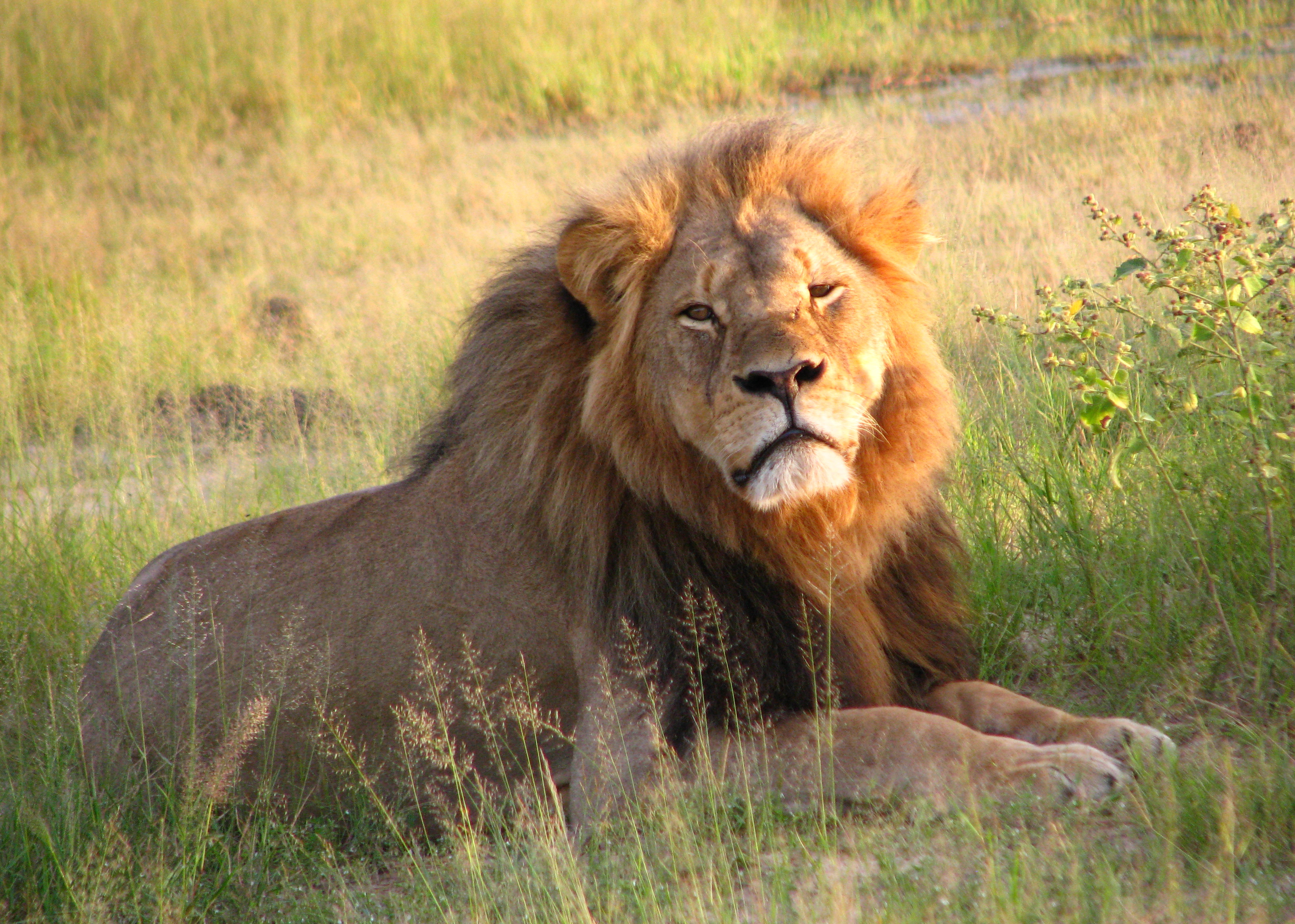
Cecil the lion, WildCRU research project lion

The Wildlife Conservation Research Unit (WildCRU) is part of the Department of Zoology at the University of Oxford in England. Its mission is to achieve practical solutions to conservation problems through original scientific research, training conservation scientists to conduct research, putting scientific knowledge into practice, and educating and involving the public to achieve lasting solutions.

The Unit was founded in 1986 by Professor David W. Macdonald. In 2022 Professor Amy Dickman took over from David W. Macdonald as Director. Members come from more than 30 countries and many have returned to hold influential roles in conservation. WildCRU research has been used to advise policy-makers worldwide. More than 300 scientific papers and 25 reports have been published, over a hundred fruitful collaborations have been fostered, and over 45 students have completed doctoral theses.

WildCRU projects use all four elements of their Conservation Quartet: research to understand the problem, education to explain it, community involvement to ensure participation and acceptance, and implementation of a solution. The approach is interdisciplinary, linking to public health, community development and animal welfare. In a new initiative concerning 'biodiversity and business', WildCRU is working directly to influence policy making processes in industry.

Current project areas include saving endangered species, resolving conflict, reconciling farming and wildlife, researching fundamental ecology, and managing wildlife diseases, pests and invasive species.

Specific projects include protecting the Ethiopian wolf, Grevy's zebra and endemic birds in the Galapagos Islands, finding solutions to bushmeat exploitation in West Africa, community conservation education in Africa, sustainable farming, badger ecology and behavior, and the impact of American mink on native wildlife in Britain, Belarus, and Argentina.

WildCRU is located in Tubney House, Abingdon Road, Tubney, Oxfordshire.

== See also ==
- David W. Macdonald
- Amy Dickman
- Claudio Sillero-Zubiri
- Ximena Vélez Liendo
