= Rachel Ikemeh =

Nigerian conservationist

Rachel Ashegbofe Ikemeh
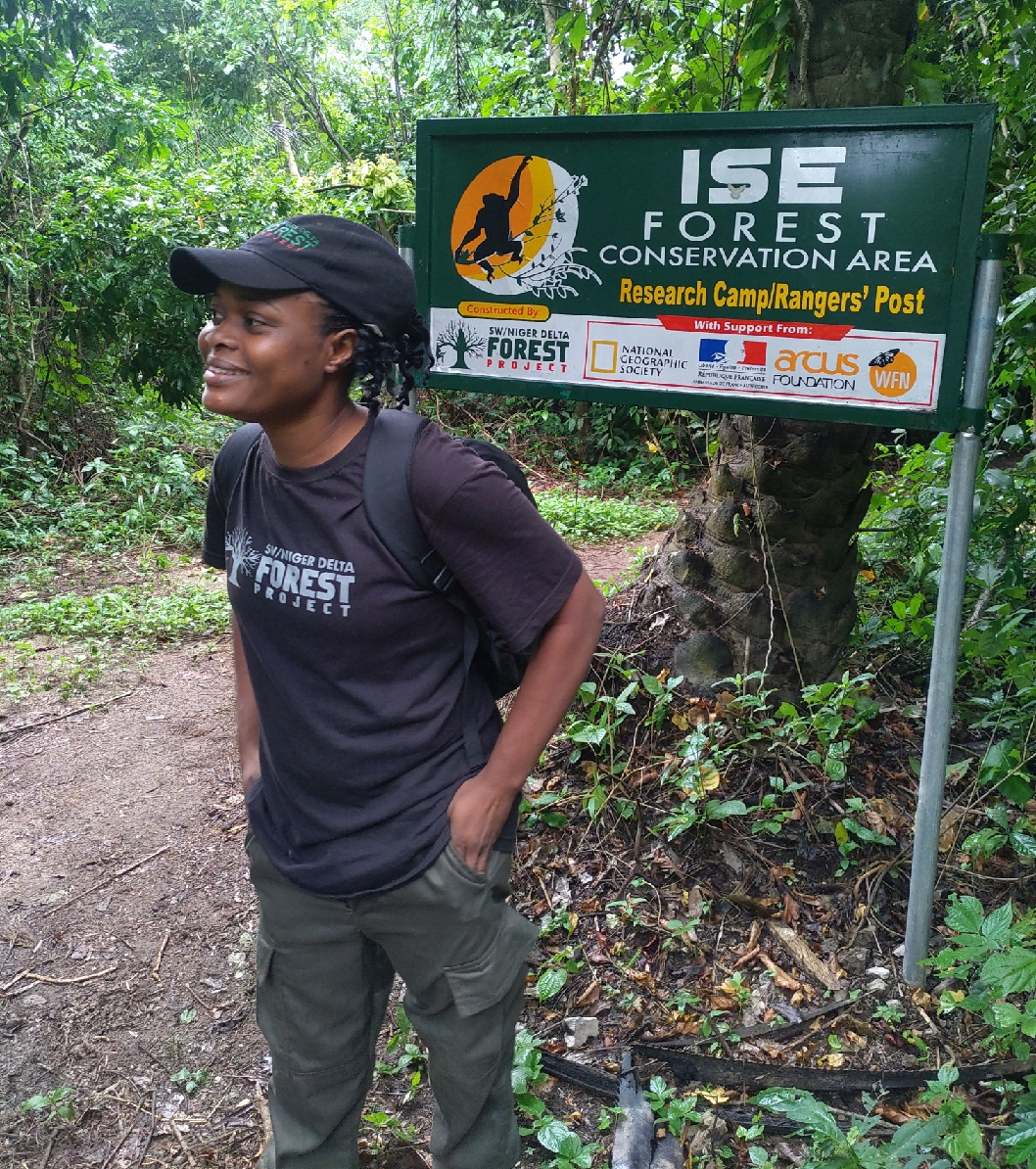
- Rachel, June 2021.
- Born: Rachel Ashegbofe Ikemeh; Nigeria
- Other name: Ashegbofe
- Education: Ahmadu Bello University, Zaria. University of Kent, UK
- Occupation: Conservationist
- Years active: 2005–present
- Known for: Wildlife conservation and forest preservation.
- Notable work: Primatology
- Awards: She won a Whitley award in 2020.

Rachel Ashegbofe Ikemeh is a Nigerian conservationist who won a Whitley award in 2020. She is the director of South West and Niger Delta Forest Project, a conservation program for endangered primates as the Nigeria-Cameroon chimpanzee, Red colobus monkey (Piliocolobus epieni) and Benin potto in the respective regions. She has actively been in Nigeria conservation for the past 15 years.

Ikemeh has been involved in the establishment of two protected areas in Nigeria: a IUCN category II PA in Ekiti State and a community conservation area in Bayelsa State, Niger Delta, Nigeria.

== Life and Education ==
Rachel Ikemeh grew up in Northern Nigeria, where she later earned a degree in public administration. After graduating she found an internship for the Nigerian Conservation Foundation, which is what led to her career as a conservationist.
