= A Man Betrayed (novel) =

Novel by J. V. Jones

A Man Betrayed is a 1996 novel written by J. V. Jones.

== Plot summary ==
A Man Betrayed is a novel in which two central characters—Melliandra, fleeing an unwanted engagement, and Jack, an impulsive youth with budding magical abilities—escape their oppressive castle and become entangled in larger, more dangerous intrigues. Pursued by forces tied to their pasts, they face constant separation and complications amidst war and prophecy.

== Reception ==
Jonathan Palmer reviewed A Man Betrayed for Arcane magazine, rating it an 8 out of 10 overall, and stated that "Anyway, the American version of Master and Fool, the final part of the trilogy, has just arrived, so soon I'll know about Melli's baby and whether Jack's magic is strong and focused enough to defeat the evil Kylock. I rather suspect it will be in the end, though perhaps only just. It should be an exciting climax."

== Reviews ==
- Review by Vikki Lee (1997) in Vector 191
