= Winnie Kiiru =

Kenyan biologist

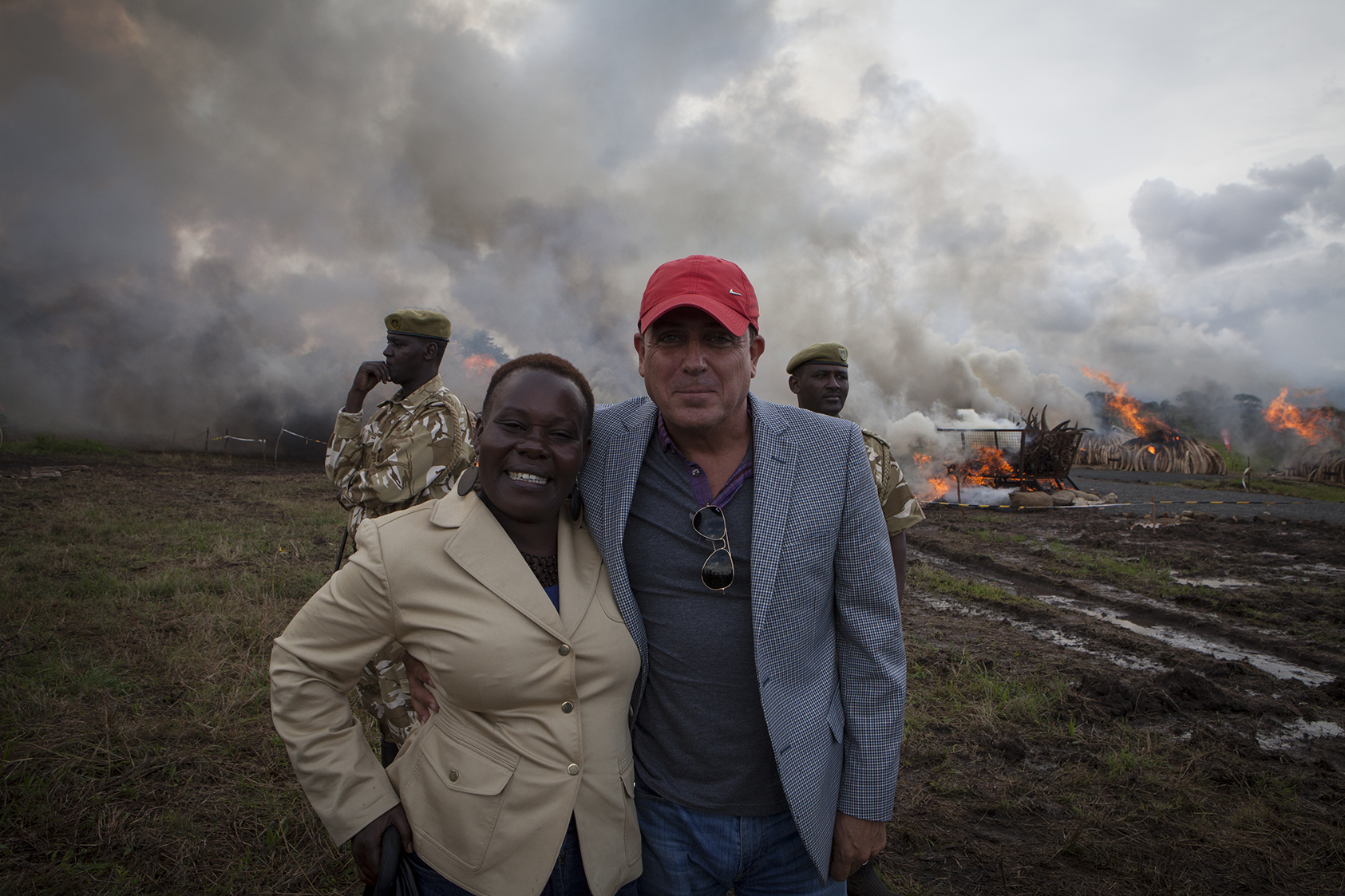
- Kiiru at an Ivory Burn in Nairobi in April 30, 2016
- Education: University of Zimbabwe; University of Kent
- Organization: Wildlife Research Institute
- Known for: Elephant conservation

Winnie Kiiru is a Kenyan biologist, elephant conservationist. She is the founder and past Executive Director of CHD Conservation Kenya, a CBO based in Amboseli that supports people-centered conservation.

== Education ==
In 1995, Kiiru earned a Master's degree from the University of Zimbabwe in Tropical Resource Ecology and a PhD in biology from the University of Kent in Canterbury.

== Career ==
Kiiru has worked for the Elephant Protection Initiative and the Stop Ivory initiative. Dr. Kiiru is a past member the Wildlife Research Training Institute in Kenya. Kiiru served as a trustee of the Kenya Wildlife Service and the Amboseli Trust for Elephants.

Kiiru helped persuade the Kenyan government to publicly burn ivory tusks, and a video of the burning featured in the 2018 film Anthropocene: The Human Epoch. In 2021, Kiiru received the State Honour “Order of the Grand Warrior” in recognition of her leadership in conservation.
