= J. V. Jones =

British fantasy writer (born 1963)

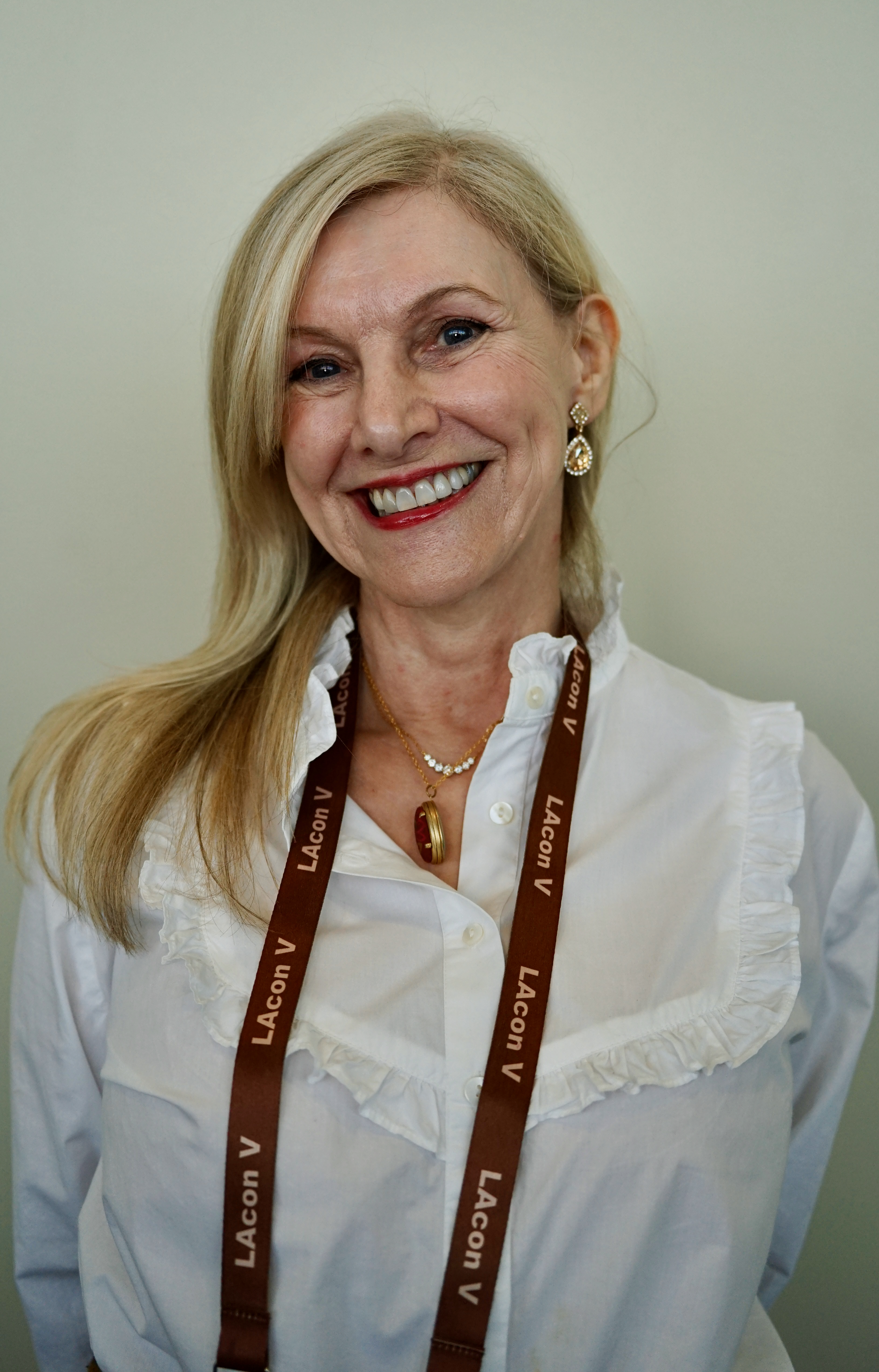
- Jones at Worldcon 2026
- Born: 1963 (age 62–63); Liverpool, England
- Occupation: Author
- Writing career
- Genre: Fantasy

Julie Victoria Jones (born 1963) is an American/British fantasy author.

== Personal life ==
Julie Victoria Jones was born in Liverpool in 1963. Jones was an avid reader from an early age and has cited numerous literary influences, including Charles Dickens, Mark Twain, Jane Austen, Jack London, J. R. R. Tolkien, C. S. Lewis, and Ursula K. Le Guin.

In her youth, Jones worked as a barmaid in a pub in Liverpool. At age 20 she began to work for a local record label. She later moved to San Diego, California, where she ran an export business for several years and then served as a computer consultant, software developer, and marketing director for an interactive software company. In her announcement of the completion of Endlords, she wrote that during the years it took to complete she worked "jobs that included dog sitting, selling women's clothes on eBay and freelancing writing".

== Literary career ==
Jones's literary career began with the publication of the fantasy novel The Baker's Boy in 1995. The manuscript that was to become The Baker's Boy was initially submitted as Immortal Longings to Warner Books in 1993. In a joint essay, The Road to a First Novel, Jones and editor Betsy Mitchell described the editing process that followed the arrival of the manuscript in the publisher's slush pile.

The Baker's Boy achieved bestseller status and was followed by two sequels, A Man Betrayed (1996) and Master and Fool (1997), both achieving similar levels of success and established Jones as "one of the biggest new names in fantasy". Following the completion of this trilogy, dubbed The Book of Words, Jones wrote a standalone fantasy novel, The Barbed Coil (1997). She has since written the Sword of Shadows series of fantasy novels, set in a different area of the same world as The Book of Words, though considerably grimmer in tone.

In addition to writing fantasy novels, Jones has also written science fiction short stories on various subjects, including the internet and virtual reality, though she has never tried to get any of them published.

== Bibliography ==
The Book of Words trilogy

- The Baker's Boy (1995)
- A Man Betrayed (1996)
- Master and Fool (1997)

Sword of Shadows series

- A Cavern of Black Ice (1999)
- A Fortress of Grey Ice (2002)
- A Sword from Red Ice (2007)
- Watcher of the Dead (2010)
- Endlords (forthcoming)
- A Sword Named Loss (forthcoming)

Standalone novels

- The Barbed Coil (1997)
