= Institute of Zoology =

Research institute of the Zoological Society of London

Coordinates: 51.5357°N 0.1575°W

The Institute of Zoology (IoZ) is the research division of the Zoological Society of London (ZSL) in England. It is a government-funded research institute specialising in scientific issues relevant to the conservation of animal species and their habitats. The Institute is located alongside London Zoo at ZSL's Regent's Park site in the City of Westminster. The Institute has around 25 full-time research staff, plus postdoctoral research assistants, technicians and Ph.D. students. The Institute is supported by the Higher Education Funding Council for England in partnership with the University of Cambridge, and receives additional research funding from UK research councils (NERC, BBSRC, ESRC) and research charities (the Wellcome Trust and the Leverhulme Trust). Research covers many fundamental aspects of biological sciences which have relevance to the conservation of animal species and their habitats.

The Institute offers research training through Ph.D. studentships, and hosts Undergraduate and Masters level research projects conducted as part of its own M.Sc. courses and courses at other institutions. Undergraduate projects are available at London Zoo and Whipsnade Zoo.

== See also ==
- Living Planet Index
- Red List Index
- Regional Red List
- EDGE of Existence Programme
- EDGE Species
