= Krithi Karanth =

Conservation zoologist

K. Krithi Karanth
- Born: Mangalore, Karnataka
- Education: University of Florida; Yale University; Duke University
- Occupations: Wildlife Conservation, Conservation Biology, Carnivora Biology
- Years active: 2001 to present
- Employer(s): Centre for Wildlife Studies, Ramanujan Fellow
- Known for: Conservation
- Parent: K. Ullas Karanth
- Website: http://www.conservationindia.org/author/krithi

Krithi Karanth is a conservation biologist who is chief conservation scientist and director at the Centre for Wildlife Studies (CWS), Bangalore, India and an adjunct faculty member of the Nicholas School at Duke University in the United States and the National Centre for Biological Sciences in India.

Karanth is a National Geographic Explorer, and has received multiple awards for her research, conservation and educational work, including the 2025 John P. McNulty Prize and the 2019 Women of Discovery Awards. She was the first Indian and Asian woman to receive the 2021 Wild Innovator Award. This award from the Wild Elements Foundation is given to innovators, advocates and partners to "disrupt the status quo and identify solutions to global sustainability and conservation".

== Early life and education ==
Krithi Karanth grew up in Karnataka, India, in the Western Ghats, where her father, conservation biologist K. Ullas Karanth studies tigers. She saw her first tiger on a field trip at the age of three. At a young age, she learned how to track tigers and to set camera traps. Her mother Prathibha Karanth worked as a professor at the SRC Institute of Speech and Hearing, Bangalore.

Karanth has a B.S (Environmental Science) and B.A degrees (Geography) from the University of Florida (2001), a Master's in Environmental Science (M.E.Sc) from Yale University (2003), and a Ph.D in Environmental Science and Policy from Duke University (2008). Karanth did postdoctoral work at Columbia University from 2009-2010. In her doctoral thesis, Karanth studied the extinction of species of large mammals in India. This work was published in Proceedings of The Royal Society of London in 2010.

== Work ==
External videos
- “Ted Style Talk: Dr. Krithi Karanth, CEO, Center for Wildlife Studies & National Geographic Explorer”, Indiaspora, April 11, 2024
- Krithi Karanth, Rewilding India: Transforming Human-Wildlife Interactions, May 27, 2021

At age 31, Karanth returned to India, becoming a Ramanujan Fellow and a research fellow at the Centre for Wildlife Studies (CWS India). Through research in India and Asia, Karanth examines interactions between humans and wildlife, and their impacts on conservation. She studies patterns of species distributions and extinction and the impacts of activities such as wildlife tourism, voluntary resettlement, biodiversity in production landscapes, and changes in land use patterns. Her research work on resettlement has been used as a basis for Central government policy decisions. Her research on tourism was presented as evidence in a Supreme Court case that reviewed guidelines for national wildlife tourism.

In 2015, Karanth founded "Wild Seve" (“wild service” in Kannada), providing a helpline and staff to help people register and process claims for government compensation for wild animal-caused losses to crops, livestock or property. Staff members attempt to follow up on reports within 48 hours, to document damage and file paperwork. They then track the claim until it is paid out. Large mammals such as leopards and wolves may attack livestock or people; wild pigs can damage crops; and elephants may also damage property. As of 2021, the Wild Seve program had processed nearly 18,000 claims from the 600 villages and settlements near the Bandipur and Nagarhole national parks. In 2018, CWS worked with the Vidhi Centre for Legal Policy to review the government compensation policies of various regions and recommend best practices.

Children, particularly those living near wildlife reserves, are likely to first experience wild animals as causes of damage to people, crops, and livestock. This can be traumatic and result in significant economic hardship. In 2017, Karanth began working with educator Gabby Salazar to develop a "conservation program that uses education, art, storytelling, and games" to help local populations, particularly students, who may come into frequent contact with wildlife. Students learn to better understand wild animals that they may encounter in their habitats, and develop strategies to respond in ways that can minimize conflict. Their first program was "Wild Shaale" (“wild school” in Kannada). Piloted in 2018 in 38 classes, the program has since been used in hundreds of schools and reached over 30,000 children.

In 2020 Karanth began the program "Wild Surakshe" (“wild health” in Kannada) to address health issues affecting national parks and protected areas in Karnataka. Examples of such concerns include first-aid, cases of rabies and leptospirosis, and Nipah virus outbreaks.

Karanth has published more than 100 articles and been on the editorial boards of the journals Conservation Biology, Conservation Letters, and Frontiers in Ecology and the Environment. She has involved and supervised over 200 scientists and 750 citizen science volunteers in the course of her research and conservation work.

Her work has been covered nationally and internationally. Her research and conservation work have been featured in the BBC Series The Hunt (2015) by David Attenborough, Big Cats (2018) and Dynasties (2018), and in documentaries by CBC and PBS. Karanth has co-produced the documentaries Wild Seve (2017), Humane Highways (2018), Wild Shaale, Flying Elephants (2020, with Prakash Matada) and Wild Surakshe (2020). Karanth appeared with Kevin Pietersen in Save This Rhino: India (2020), produced by Disney Hotstar and National Geographic.

== Honours and awards ==
- 2011, National Geographic Society's 10,000th grantee.
- 2012-2017, Ramanujan Fellow
- 2012, National Geographic Emerging Explorer.
- 2012, one of India's Power Women, Femina.
- 2013, Women of the Year, Elle India.
- 2013, Outstanding Young Alumnus, University of Florida
- 2013, INK Fellow, INK Global Foundation
- 2015, Young Global Leader, World Economic Forum
- 2018, Thrive Leadership Award, Woodland Park Zoo, Seattle, USA (with Ullas Karanth)
- 2019, Rolex Awards for Enterprise, Rolex.
- 2019, The Anokhi Passion List
- 2019, Women of Discovery Awards, WINGS WorldQuest
- 2020, Eisenhower Fellowship
- 2021, Wild Innovator Award, WILD ELEMENTS Foundation
- 2023, World Sustainability Award, MDPI Sustainability Foundation
- 2024, The Explorers Club 50
- 2025, John P. McNulty Prize, Anne Welsh McNulty and Aspen Institute
