= Eleanor Sterling =

American biologist

- Born: October 3, 1960
- Died: February 11, 2023 (aged 62); Oahu, Hawaii
- Education: Yale University
- Employer: American Museum of Natural History
- Awards: Wilbur Cross Medal, Fred M. Packard Award

Eleanor Sterling (October 3, 1960 – February 11, 2023) was an conservationist and biologist. She was the director of the Center for Biodiversity and Conservation at the American Museum of Natural History and also became the director of Hawaiʻi Institute of Marine Biology (HIMB) at the University of Hawaiʻi Mānoa (UHM).

== Early life and education ==
Sterling was born on October 3, 1960, in Massachusetts, and was raised in Davis, California, with her sister and two brothers. She attended Yale University and graduated with her B.A. in Psychology and Biology in 1983. As an undergraduate at Yale, she studied under anthropologist Alison Richard and performed with the senior SSAA a cappella group, Whim 'n Rhythm. Sterling received two higher degrees from Yale, a Masters of Philosophy in 1989 and a Ph.D. in Anthropology and Forestry in 1993. Her thesis work at Yale focused on the behavioral ecology of the aye-aye and she continued to study as a Peace Corps trainer in Madagascar.

== Career ==
Immediately after graduating from her undergraduate program at Yale, Sterling worked for the San Diego Zoo and the World Wildlife Fund, where she first became interested in the aye-aye. Throughout the 1990s, she served as a trainer and consultant for the Peace Corps for several years, primarily working in Madagascar and Comoros. She was a visiting researcher at Duke University in 1992 and at the American Museum of Natural History in 1993, where she would return in 1996 as a Program Director of the Center for Biodiversity and Conservation (CBC). In 2000, she became the director of the CBC. From 2014 to 2021, Sterling served as the Jaffe Chief Conservation Scientist at the museum, where her work spanned the globe, including countries like Bolivia, Vietnam, and The Bahamas. While at the AMNH, she founded the Network of Conservation Educators and Practitioners, mentored students in the Richard Gilder Graduate School, and curated five exhibitions on topics such as global food systems, Pinta Island tortoises, and China's Yunnan Province. She also founded the New York Women in Natural Sciences Chapter of the Association for Women in Sciences, where she helped develop the Untold Stories in Conservation and Natural History project to highlight underrepresented individuals in the field.

Sterling was also a founding member of the Ecology, Evolution, and Environmental Biology Department at Columbia University, and served as an adjunct professor there as well as the Director of Graduate Studies from 2002 to 2012.

Sterling's early work on the aye-aye established her as a leading expert on the species, and her later research focused on the behavioral ecology of endangered species, including sea turtles in the Palmyra Atoll and Giant Galápagos Tortoises. She authored and co-authored over 200 publications, including the first published guide to flora and fauna in Vietnam published in 2006, Vietnam: A Natural History. Sterling was also the editor of Lessons in Conservation, the journal of the Network of Conservation Educators and Practitioners, and served on the Board of Directors for the Center for Humans and Nature.

Sterling was involved with the International Union for Conservation of Nature and Nature Resources (IUCN), most notably serving as the deputy vice chair of the World Commission on Protected Areas, where she helped to develop a Strategic Framework for Capacity Development. From 2018 to 2022, she also served on the Board of Directors of Island Conservation, and as chair of the diversity, equity, and inclusion committee.

In 2022, she became the director of the Hawai'i Institute of Marine Biology at the University of Hawai'i at Mānoa. After her death in 2023, her friends established a fund for the institute in her honor.

== Personal life and death ==
While working for the Peace Corps in Madagascar, Sterling met Kevin Frey, another volunteer. They married in 1996. In November 2022, Sterling was diagnosed with pancreatic cancer and died on February 11, 2023, in Oahu.

== Awards ==
In 2012, she received the Graduate Student Advisory Council Faculty Mentoring Award from Columbia University. In 2013, she received a Distinguished Service Award from the Society for Conservation Biology. In 2016, Yale University awarded her the Wilbur Cross Medal. She also received the Award for Meritorious Research from IUCN's Commission on Environmental, Economic, and Social Policy in 2016. In 2018, she was awarded Yale School of Forestry & Environmental Studies Alumni Award, as well as the Women of Discovery Humanity Award and a WINGS World Quest award. Six days before her death in 2023, she was awarded the Fred Packard Award from IUCN.
