= Eddie Game =

Conservation biologist

Edward T. Game is a conservation biologist, editor-in-chief of the scientific journal Conservation Letters, and lead scientist of The Nature Conservancy.

== Career ==
Game has served as editor-in-chief of Conservation Letters, a journal of the Society for Conservation Biology the number one ranked journal (out of 177) in the category "Environmental Science: Nature and Landscape Conservation". He is author of the 2015 book Conservation Planning: Informed Decisions for a Healthier Planet and, as of September 2020, has published 98 research articles that have been cited over 5000 times. Topics he has published on include marine protected areas, climate change, decision science, ecoacoustics, fisheries, environmental monitoring, remote sensing, land use planning, indigenous knowledge, and cross-sector evidence standards.
