= Timon McPhearson =

American Urban ecologist and academic

Dr. Timon McPhearson
- Occupations: Urban ecologist, researcher, academic, author
- Years active: 1997—present
- Awards: Sustainability Science Award from the Ecological Society of America (2023)

Academic background
- Education: B.S. in Environmental Biology (Taylor University); PhD in Ecology, Evolution, and Natural Resources (Rutgers University); Postdoctoral research in Ecology, Evolution, and Environmental Biology, Earth Institute (Columbia University)
- Alma mater: Columbia University, Rutgers University, Taylor University
- Thesis: The Complexity of Cooperation in Ecological Communities (2004)
- Doctoral advisor: Peter J. Morin

Academic work
- Discipline: Ecology
- Sub-discipline: Urban ecology
- Institutions: New York University, The New School
- Main interests: Urban planning, urban ecology, urban forests, social-ecological-technological systems (SETS), urban resilience, climate change risk, adaptation

Timon McPhearson is an American urban ecologist, researcher, academic and author. He is a professor of Environmental Studies at New York University and the founder and director of the Urban Systems Lab. McPhearson is known for his interdisciplinary research on the interacting social-ecological-technological processes that drive urban system dynamics and impact human well-being. He is a research fellow at the Cary Institute of Ecosystem Studies and Stockholm Resilience Centre. McPhearson received the 2023 (Note: 2023 was his third win of the award.) Sustainability Science Award from the Ecological Society of America.

== Academic background ==
McPhearson received a B.S. in Environmental Biology from Taylor University 1997, and then a PhD in ecology, Evolution, and Natural Resources from Rutgers University in 2004. In 2008, he finished his Postdoctoral research in Ecology, Evolution, and Environmental Biology (E3B) from the Earth Institute at Columbia University.

== Career ==
From 2003 to 2005, McPhearson worked as a biodiversity scientist for the Center for Biodiversity and Conservation at the American Museum of Natural History (AMNH). And from 2004 to 2009, he worked as a scientist for the Network of Conservation Educators and Practitioners at the AMNH, including as a scientific advisor at Science Bulletins, an original production of the National Center for Science Literacy, Education, and Technology (NCSLET), which is also a part of the Department of Education at AMNH.

In 2016, McPhearson co-founded the Future Earth Urban Knowledge Network, an international network of multidisciplinary researchers and innovators working on resolving cumbersome urban problems worldwide and served as co-chair until 2021.

From 2019 to 2021, McPhearson consulted for UN-HABITAT, CGIAR's Research Program on Climate Change, Agriculture and Food Security, the Green Climate Fund (GCF) and the International Fund for Agricultural Development (IFAD).

During the COVID-19 pandemic, and from 2020 to 2022, McPhearson was a member at the NYC Mayor's Office of Resiliency Rapid Research and Assessment Initiative on COVID-19 and a partner at NYC Mayor's Office of Data Analytics and the mayor's Office of Policy and Planning, COVID Recovery Data Partnership.

McPhearson has been an adviser at the World Resources Institute, Ross Center for Sustainable Cities since 2020, an inaugural member of the World Economic Forum (WEF)'s Global Commission on BiodiverCities since 2021, and member of The New School's Zolberg Institute's Cities and Human Mobility Research Collaborative since 2020 and Tishman Environment and Design Center at The New School since 2016.

McPhearson contributed to the Intergovernmental Panel on Biodiversity and Ecosystem Services (IPBES) first global assessment as a contributing author from 2018 to 2020, and a lead author for Intergovernmental Panel on Climate Change (IPCC) Sixth Assessment Report (AR6).

=== Academia ===
From 2008 to 2009, McPhearson was a visiting assistant professor of ecology at Columbia University's Earth Institute.

From 2008 to 2016, McPhearson was an assistant professor of Urban Ecology at The New School. He was tenured at associate professor level in 2016 and appointed as full professor in 2021.

In 2015, McPhearson founded the Urban Systems Lab at The New School and serves as its director. From 2015 to 2017, he served as a chair of the Environmental Studies Program at The New School.

In 2017, McPhearson was a visiting research fellow at Humboldt University. He has also been serving as a senior research fellow at both the Cary Institute of Ecosystem Studies and at Stockholm University's Stockholm Resilience Center since 2017.

In 2021, McPhearson became a faculty affiliate at the Beijer Institute of Ecological Economics, Royal Swedish Academy of Sciences.

In 2025, McPhearson joined New York University as a professor and continues as director of the Urban Systems Lab at its new institutional home with NYU's Department of Environmental Studies.

== Bibliography ==
=== Books ===
- Urban Planet: Knowledge towards Sustainable Cities, (Note: Edited by Thomas Elmqvist, Stockholm Resilience Centre, Xuemei Bai, Australian National University, Canberra, Niki Frantzeskaki, Erasmus University, The Netherlands, Corrie Griffith, Arizona State University, David Maddox, The Nature of Cities, Timon McPhearson, New School University, New York, Susan Parnell, University of Cape Town, Patricia Romero-Lankao, National Center for Atmospheric Research, Boulder, Colorado, David Simon, Chalmers University of Technology, Gothenburg, Mark Watkins, Arizona State University) Cambridge University Press (2018) ISBN 9781316647554 doi:10.1017/9781316647554
- Resilient Urban Futures, (Note: An open access book, part of the book series: "The Urban Book Series (UBS)". Editors: Zoé A. Hamstead, David M. Iwaniec, Timon McPhearson, Marta Berbés-Blázquez, Elizabeth M. Cook, Tischa A. Muñoz-Erickson) Springer-Nature (2021) ISBN 978-3-030-63130-7 doi:10.1007/978-3-030-63131-4
- Nature-Based Solutions for Cities, (Note: Edited by Timon McPhearson, Nadja Kabisch, and Niki Frantzeskaki) Edward Elgar Publishing (2023) ISBN 9781800376755 doi:10.4337/9781800376762

=== Select publications ===
- Gómez-Baggethun, Erik, Åsa Gren, David N. Barton, Johannes Langemeyer, Timon McPhearson, Patrick O’farrell, Erik Andersson, Zoé Hamstead, and Peleg Kremer. "Urban ecosystem services." Urbanization, biodiversity and ecosystem services: Challenges and opportunities: A global assessment (2013): 175–251. doi:10.1007/978-94-007-7088-1_11
- McPhearson, Timon, Steward TA Pickett, Nancy B. Grimm, Jari Niemelä, Marina Alberti, Thomas Elmqvist, Christiane Weber, Dagmar Haase, Jürgen Breuste, and Salman Qureshi. "Advancing urban ecology toward a science of cities." BioScience 66, no. 3 (2016): 198–212. doi:10.1093/biosci/biw002
- Bennett, Elena M., Martin Solan, Reinette Biggs, Timon McPhearson, Albert V. Norström, Per Olsson, Laura Pereira et al. "Bright spots: seeds of a good Anthropocene." Frontiers in Ecology and the Environment 14, no. 8 (2016): 441–448. doi:10.1002/fee.1309
- McPhearson, T., D. Iwaniec, X. Bai. “Positives visions for guiding transformations toward desirable urban futures.” Current Opinion in Environmental Sustainability doi:10.1016/j.cosust.2017.04.004
- McPhearson, T., S. Parnell, D. Simon, O. Gaffney, T. Elmqvist, X. Bai, D. Roberts, A. Revi. 2016. “Scientists must have a say in the future of cities.” Nature, 538:165-166
- Dodman, D., B. Hayward, M. Pelling, V. Castan Broto, W. Chow, E. Chu, R. Dawson, L. Khirfan, T. McPhearson, A. Prakash, Y. Zheng, and G. Ziervogel. (2022). IPCC AR6 WGII Chapter 6: Cities, Settlements and Key Infrastructure. In: Climate Change 2022: Impacts, Adaptation, and Vulnerability. Contribution of Working Group II to the Sixth Assessment Report of the Intergovernmental Panel on Climate Change [H.-O. Pörtner, et al. (eds.)]. Cambridge University Press. doi:10.1017/9781009325844.008
- Ilieva, R.T., T. McPhearson. 2018. “Social media data for urban sustainability.” Nature Sustainability 1:553–565
- Keeler, B.L., P. Hamel, T. McPhearson, et al. 2019. “Social-ecological and technological factors moderate the value of urban nature.” Nature Sustainability 2: 29–38
- McPhearson, T., M. Raymond, C., Gulsrud, N., Albert, C., Coles, N., Fagerholm, N., Nagatsu, M., Olafsson, A.S., Soininen, N., and Vierikko, K. (2021). Radical changes for transformations to a good Anthropocene. npj Urban Sustainability. 1(5). doi:10.1038/s42949-021-00017-x
- McPhearson, T., E. Cook, M. Berbés-Blázquez, C. Cheng, N.B. Grimm, et al. (2022). A social-ecological-technological systems approach to urban ecosystem services. One Earth, 5, 5, 505–518.
- McPhearson, T., E. Andersson, T. Elmqvist, N.Frantzeskaki. 2015. “Resilience Of and Through Urban Ecosystem Services,“ Ecosystem Services 12:152-156, doi:10.1016/j.ecoser.2014.07.012
- Petchey, O.L., P.T. McPhearson, T.M. Casey, P.J. Morin. 1999. “Environmental warming alters food-web structure and ecosystem function.” Nature 420:69-72
- Elmqvist, Thomas, Erik Andersson, Niki Frantzeskaki, Timon McPhearson, Per Olsson, Owen Gaffney, Kazuhiko Takeuchi, and Carl Folke. "Sustainability and resilience for transformation in the urban century." Nature sustainability 2, no. 4 (2019): 267–273. doi:10.1038/s41893-019-0250-1

== Awards ==
- 2023 Sustainability Science Award, Ecological Society of America
- 2022 Gulbenkian Prize for Humanity (to IPCC and IPBES)
- 2021 BiodivERsA Prize, “Enabling Green and Blue Infrastructure Potential in Complex Social-Ecological Regions” (ENABLE Project)
- 2020 New York City Climate Heroes Award, NYC Department of Transportation and Human Impacts Institute
- 2019 Sustainability Science Award, Ecological Society of America
- 2019 Innovation in Sustainability Science Award, Ecological Society of America
- 2018 BiodivERsA Prize, “Urban Biodiversity and Ecosystem Services” (URBES Project)
- 2017 Distinguished University Teaching Award, The New School
