= Mūmū Nunatak =

Nunatuk in Antarctica

Mūmū Nunatak (77°27′S 169°4′E) is a nunatak in the north part of Kyle Hills, Ross Island. The feature is 2 nautical miles (3.7 km) west-southwest of Towle Point and 0.6 nautical miles (1.1 km) inland from steep cliffs that form the northeast edge of the island. The name Mūmū (meaning boisterous wind) is one of several Maori wind names applied by New Zealand Geographic Board (NZGB) in this area.
