= ECCB (disambiguation) =

ECCB may refer to:

== Monetary authority ==
- Eastern Caribbean Central Bank, monetary authority of a group of eight Caribbean nations.

== Scientific Conference ==
- European Conference on Computational Biology, a scientific conference on Bioinformatics and Computational Biology
- European Congress of Conservation Biology, a scientific conference on biodiversity and Conservation Biology

== Religious denomination ==
- Evangelical Church of Czech Brethren
