= Mweetwa =

Mweetwa is a surname. Notable people with the surname include:

- Nchimunya Mweetwa (born 1984), Zambian football striker
- Thandiwe Mweetwa (born 1988), Zambian wildlife biologist
