= K. Ullas Karanth =

Indian conservationist & zoologist (born 1948)

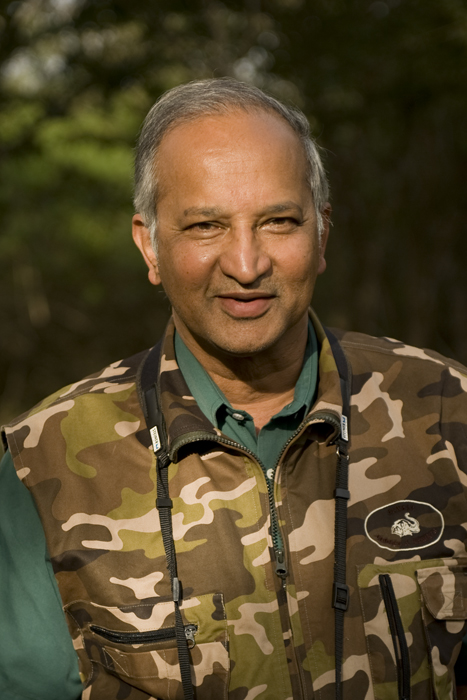
- Born: 1948 (age 77–78); Puttur, Karnataka, India
- Education: MSc in wildlife ecology, University of Florida; PhD Applied Zoology, Mangalore University
- Alma mater: NITK, Surathkal
- Occupations: Wildlife Conservation, Conservation Biology, Carnivora Biology
- Years active: 1988–present
- Employer(s): National Centre for Biological Sciences, Centre for Wildlife Studies, Wildlife Conservation Society
- Known for: Tiger Conservation
- Notable work: over 135 international peer-reviewed scientific papers and popular articles, and seven books in English and Kannada
- Spouse: Prathibha Karanth
- Children: Krithi Karanth
- Parent: father: Shivram Karanth
- Awards: J. Paul Getty Award for Conservation Leadership, Padma Shree
- Website: Dr K. Ullas Karanth, CWS

Kota Ullas Karanth (born 1948) is a conservation zoologist and a leading tiger expert based in Karnataka, India. He was the director of the Wildlife Conservation Society's India Programme. He is notable for pioneering the scientific use of camera traps in population density studies of large wild mammals in India. He was a Senior Conservation Scientist with the New York based Wildlife Conservation Society (WCS) and Technical Director of the WCS Tiger Conservation Program.

Karanth directed the WCS-I effort to help save Bengal tigers, and has conducted country-wide surveys to better estimate their population and habitat needs. Working mainly in the Nagarhole National Park, Karanth's work has demonstrated the importance of conserving prey populations in order to ensure the survival of keystone predator species such as the tiger.

In 2007, Karanth was the second recipient of the World Wildlife Fund's annual J. Paul Getty Award for Conservation Leadership. In 2019, he became the first recipient of the George Schaller Lifetime Award in Wildlife Conservation Science from the Wildlife Conservation Society of New York.

== Early life ==
Karanth is the son of noted Kannada writer, Shivaram Karanth. In his adolescence, Karanth read about naturalists trying to save tigers in Asia. While he resolved to join the effort, he did his B.Tech. in Mechanical Engineering from KREC (now known as NITK), Suratkal, where he studied from 1966 to 1971. He then tried his hand at farming in Karnataka for several years.

His amateur biological observations of the flora and fauna of his native Karnataka State in Southern India, under severe pressure from incompatible human activity, spurred him to investigate conservation models for the Western Ghats, a global biodiversity hotspot. A 1983 meeting with a visiting Smithsonian Institution delegation paved the way for his travel to the US, where he studied in the National Zoo's Wildlife Conservation and Management Training Program in 1987. He obtained his master's degree in Wildlife Ecology from the University of Florida in 1988, and a Doctorate in Applied Zoology from Mangalore University in 1993.

== Studies on tiger populations ==
His single longest project is the monitoring of the health of forests and biodiversity in Nagarahole Wildlife Sanctuary and National Park, Karnataka. Some results arising out of the study, on the status of tigers and their prey in particular, have been published in several scientific papers and books.

Karanth pioneered the scientific application of camera trapping techniques of capture-recapture sampling as the foundation of scientific estimation of tiger population densities in forests. By applying a robust statistical model to camera trapping sampling data, a close estimate of tiger population in a given area can be determined. This is distinctly different from the pugmark method previously used by the Indian Ministry of Environment and Forests, Project Tiger five-year tiger census. It is also different in its approach in that it does not claim to produce an absolute count of tigers in a given area but is more indicative of population levels.

This approach to tiger conservation relies on conservation of forests from both a prey and predator perspective. Karanth suggests that with such approaches, it is possible to preserve tigers in India and elsewhere.

== Other work ==
Karanth has conducted groundbreaking research on the ecology of tigers and other large mammals. He pioneered radio-telemetry of tigers in India. He founded the Centre for Wildlife Studies, published more than 135 international peer-reviewed scientific papers and popular articles, and authored seven books in English and Kannada.

Karanth serves on the Government of India's Forest Advisory Committee, National Tiger Conservation Authority (NTCA) and Government of Karnataka's Tiger Conservation Foundation and Tiger Steering Committees. He is past Vice-President of the Bombay Natural History Society and a Scientific Advisor to several conservation advocacy groups in India. He is the Scientific Advisor to Wildlife First, a pro-active wildlife advocacy group and is prime mover in a WCS-funded multi-institutional initiative running a graduate program in Wildlife Biology and Conservation at the National Centre for Biological Sciences at Bangalore. In 2008, Karanth was elected a member of the Indian Academy of Sciences.

Karanth is a scientific fellow of the Zoological Society of London, and is on the editorial board of the journals Oryx and Journal of Applied Ecology. He also serves on the IUCN Species Survival Commission specialist groups on Cats, Elephants, Wild Cattle and Small Carnivores. Karanth has adjunct teaching faculty status at NCBS, Bangalore and at the Department of Wildlife Biology, University of Minnesota. He also supervises doctoral candidates at Manipal University, Karnataka.

Karanth was consulted by author R. K. Narayan who was working on his book A Tiger for Malgudi, a book about an anthropomorphic tiger's adventures; because of his knowledge on the animal.

Karanth also works conservation policy issues and mitigation of human-wildlife conflict. Karanth has traveled widely to provide expert consultation to research/conservation projects in Thailand, Malaysia, Cambodia, Laos, Myanmar, Indonesia, Russia, and some countries in Africa and Latin America. His work has been featured in international media including Nature, The New York Times, National Geographic Channel, BBC, CNN and the Discovery Channel.

== Awards ==
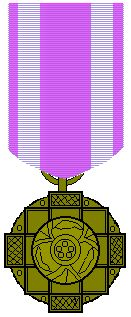
Padma Shri award

In 2006, Karanth received the Sierra Club International EarthCare award. In 2007, Karanth won the 200,000 J. Paul Getty Award for Conservation Leadership. Also in 2007, he won the Sanctuary Asia lifetime achievement award.

In 2010, Karanth received the Karnataka Government's Rajyothsava Award. In January 2012, Karanth was conferred with the prestigious Padma Shri award for his outstanding contributions to Wildlife Conservation and Environment Protection. In 2019, he was awarded the George Schaller Lifetime Award in Wildlife Conservation Science from the Wildlife Conservation Society.

== Publications ==
Karanth has published over 80 peer reviewed papers including in scientific journals such as Proceedings of the National Academy of Sciences, USA, Ecology, Journal of Applied Ecology, Ecological Applications, Journal of Animal Ecology, PLoS Genetics, Journal of Zoology, Journal of Tropical Ecology, Conservation Biology, Biological Conservation, Oryx and scientific books published by Oxford University Press, Cambridge Press, Columbia University Press, Elsevier, Springer and Island Press. He has authored the books The Way of the Tiger (2001) and A view from the Machan (2006) and co-edited Monitoring Tigers and their Prey (2002) and Camera traps in Animal Ecology (2010). He has written over 50 popular articles in English as well as popular articles and 3 books in Kannada language. He serves on the editorial boards of Oryx and Journal of Applied Ecology.

Books

- The Way of the Tiger (Hardcover and Paperback, the latter by Orient Longman)
- View from the Machan - How Science Can Save The Fragile Predator (Orient Longman)
