= Women of Discovery Awards =

- Date: 2003
- Presented by: WINGS WorldQuest
- Website: http://www.wingsworldquest.org

The Women of Discovery Awards are given by the non-profit WINGS WorldQuest, in recognition of the achievements of women in science and exploration. The awards were first presented in 2003, the same year that WINGS WorldQuest was formed by Milbry Polk and Leila Hadley Luce. Both the Board of Directors and a Junior Council at the granting organization, WINGS WorldQuest, are involved in selecting the recipients of the Women of Discovery Awards, who are thereafter known as Fellows.

The WINGS Women of Discovery Awards and Fellows Program were established to celebrate the ground-breaking work of women explorers and scientists who are actively out in the field today and provide critical, unrestricted funding to support and ensure continued study.

Women of Discovery Awards are given in the categories of Lifetime Achievement, Air and Space, Conservation, Courage, Earth, Field Research, Film and Exploration, Humanity, Leadership, and the Sea. In addition, some recipients have been simply designated as "Fellows", without being placed in a category. The awards include an unrestricted financial grant. In addition to its fellowship program, WINGS WorldQuest offers Flag Carrier grants in support of field researchers who are financing explorations.

== Fellows ==
The awards are given every 1-2 years. Not all awards are given each year. Sometimes the same award may be given to more than one person in the same year.

=== Voice of Discovery ===
- 2026, Mireya Mayor, inaugural award

=== Lifetime Achievement ===
- 2023, Dawn Wright
- 2022, Jill Heinerth
- 2020, Sylvia Earle (Lifetime Award)
- 2018, Nalini Nadkarni (Lifetime Achievement Award)
- 2014, Helen Thayer (Lifetime Award)
- 2010, Carol Beckwith (Lifetime Achievement)
- 2010, Angela Fisher (Lifetime Achievement)
- 2007, Jane Goodall (Lifetime Achievement)
- 2006, Eugenie Clark (Lifetime Achievement)
- 2005, Marianne Greenwood (Lifetime Achievement)

=== Awardee/Fellow ===
- 2026, Rosa Vásquez Espinoza
- 2026, Ellen Stofan
- 2026, Bayarmaa Chuluunbat
- 2026, Alison Criscitiello
- 2025, Yara M. Barros
- 2025, Divya Karnad
- 2025, Grace C. Young
- 2025, Ayana Elizabeth Johnson
- 2025, Nurzhafarina (Farina) Othman
- 2024, Paula Kahumbu
- 2024, Patrícia Medici
- 2024, Ruthmery Pillco Huarcaya
- 2024, Adriana Vergés
- 2024, Jessica Ware
- 2023, Zuzana Buřivalová
- 2023, Emma Camp
- 2023, Alifa Bintha Haque
- 2023, Cristina Mittermeier
- 2022, Karletta Chief
- 2022, Adjany Costa
- 2022, Citlalli Morelos-Juárez
- 2022, Rae Wynn-Grant
- 2011, Gretel Ehrlich (Fellow)
- 2011, Katey Walter Anthony (Fellow)
- 2011, Polly Wiessner (Fellow)
- 2010, Diana Beresford-Kroeger (Fellow)
- 2010, Nina Jablonski (Fellow)
- 2010, Rosemarie Keough (Fellow)
- 2010, Aimee Morgana (Fellow)
- 2010, Naomi Pierce (Fellow)
- 2010, Andrea Polli (Fellow)
- 2010, Milbry Polk (Fellow)
- 2010, Jill Tarter (Fellow)
- 2009, Selma Huxley Barkham (Fellow)
- 2009, Maureen Clemmons (Fellow)
- 2009, Margaret Lowman (Fellow)
- 2009, Jane Poynter (Fellow)
- 2009, Susan Shaw (Fellow)
- 2009, Cindy Lee Van Dover (Fellow)
- 2006, Isabella Abbot

=== Air and Space ===
- 2019. Darlene Lim (Air & Space Award)
- 2018, Nergis Mavalvala (Air & Space Award)
- 2009, Rosaly Lopes (Air and Space)
- 2008, Birgit Sattler (Air and Space)
- 2005, Nathalie Cabrol (Air and Space)
- 2004, Vera Rubin (Air and Space)
- 2003, Meenakshi Wadhwa (Air and Space)

=== Conservation ===
- 2019, Krithi Karanth (Conservation Award)
- 2019, Laly Lichtenfeld (Conservation Award)
- 2018, Thandiwe Mweetwa (Conservation Award)
- 2016, Marla Spivak (Conservation Award)

=== Courage ===
- 2016, Juliana Machado Ferreira (Courage Award)
- 2014, Felicity Aston (Courage Award)
- 2011, Kate Jackson (Courage)
- 2008, Liv Arnesen (Courage)
- 2008, Ann Bancroft (Courage)
- 2007, Constanza Ceruti (Courage)
- 2006, Elizabeth Bennett (Courage)
- 2005, Sabriye Tenberken (Courage)
- 2004, Stephanie Schwabe (Courage)
- 2003, Marilyn Bridges (Courage)

=== Earth ===
- 2016, Beate G. Liepert (Earth Award)
- 2014, Daphne Soares (Earth Award)
- 2011, Catherine Powers (Earth)
- 2010, Susan Dudley (Earth)
- 2009, Bolortsetseg Minjin (Earth)
- 2008, Jill Fredston (Earth)
- 2007, Erin Pettit (Earth)
- 2006, Aquilina Lestenkof (Earth)
- 2004, Katy Payne (Earth)
- 2003, Rosita Arvigo (Earth)

=== Field Research ===
- 2010, Kate Harris (Field Research)
- 2009, Leela Hazzah (Field Research)
- 2008, Lene Holm (Field Research)
- 2007, Grace Gobbo (Field Research)
- 2006, Julianna Brush (Field Research)
- 2006, Sveva Gallmann (Field Research)
- 2005, Gitanjali Bhattacharya (Field Research)
- 2005, Dalia Amor Conde (Field Research)

=== Film and Exploration ===
- 2003, Carol Amore (Film and Exploration)

=== Humanity ===
- 2019, Mandë Holford (Humanity Award)
- 2018, Eleanor Sterling (Humanity Award)
- 2016, Sheila Ochugboju (Humanity Award)
- 2014, Arita Baaijens (Humanity Award)
- 2011, Gladys Kalema-Zikusoka (Humanity)
- 2009, Aparajita Datta (Humanity)
- 2008, Irina Nikolaeva (Humanity)
- 2006, Janine Benyus (Humanity)
- 2005, Ana Pinto (Humanity)
- 2004, Iris Love (Humanity)
- 2003, Anna Roosevelt (Humanity)

=== Innovation in Technology Award ===
- Liz Taylor (Innovation in Technology Award)

=== Leadership ===
- 2016, Hope Jahren (Leadership Award)

=== Sea ===
- 2020, Diva Amon (Sea Award)
- 2018, Asha de Vos (Sea Award)
- 2016, Kristen Marhaver (Sea Award)
- 2011, Anna Cummins (Sea)
- 2010, Alexandra Morton (Sea)
- 2009, Maya Tolstoy (Sea)
- 2008, Vera Metcalf (Sea)
- 2007, Terrie Williams (Sea)
- 2006, Edie Widder (Sea)
- 2005, Sue Hendrickson (Sea)
- 2004, Marie Tharp (Sea)
- 2003, Sylvia Earle (Sea)

== Flag Carriers ==
WINGS WorldQuest Flag Carriers receive grants in support of field research to help finance explorations.

- 2023, Cassandra Quave (Egypt’s Western Desert, Flag #25)
- 2021, Sunniva Sorby (High Arctic, Flag #14)
- 2021, Rahayu Oktaviani (Indonesia, Flag #23)
- 2021, Gaelin Rosenwaks (Dominica, Flag #29)
- 2021, Sefra Alexandra (CT Quinnehtukqut River, Flag #27)
