= Mark Burgman =

Australian ecologist

Mark A. Burgman is an Australian ecologist, Professor at the University of Hawaiʻi at Mānoa from 2024 and Emeritus Professor of Risk Analysis & Environmental Policy and former Director of the Centre for Environmental Policy at Imperial College London. He was Director of the Australian Centre of Excellence for Risk Analysis (ACERA), latterly CEBRA, and Adrienne Clarke Chair of Botany at the University of Melbourne until 2017. He co-led The SWARM Project at the University of Melbourne.

== Early life and education ==
He was born in Wagga Wagga in 1956. He received a BSc from the University of New South Wales (1977), an MSc from Macquarie University, Sydney (1981), and a Ph.D. from Stony Brook University in New York State, USA (1987).

== Career ==
Burgman worked as a consultant ecologist and research scientist in Australia, the United States and Switzerland during the 1980s before joining the University of Melbourne in 1990.

He held the Adrienne Clarke Chair of Botany in the School of Botany (later the School of Biosciences from 2015) at the University of Melbourne, and became the foundation director of ACERA on its establishment in 2006-2013. ACERA and its successor, the Centre of Excellence for Biosecurity Risk Analysis (CEBRA, 2013-2017) received millions of dollars of federal funding to research environmental and biosecurity risks, working with numerous partners.

He was also a founder of the University of Melbourne's Office for Environmental Programs in the early 2000s, which offers an innovative cross-Faculty environmental master's degree and now has over 400 students.

After six years at Imperial College London, he joined the University of Hawaiʻi at Mānoa in 2024.

Burgman has received research grants from the Australian Research Council, government and EU agencies, industry and private foundations.

He is editor of Conservation Biology.

== Scholarly contributions ==
Burgman works on applying model-based risk assessment to problems in conservation biology. His research has included models of a broad range of species including giant kelp, orange-bellied parrots, Leadbeater's possums, bandicoots, and banksias. He has worked in a range of environments including marine fisheries, forestry, irrigation, electrical power utilities, mining, and national park planning. Latterly he has worked on expert scientific judgements, and their unreliability.

He has published four authored books, two edited books, and over 200 research papers, and more than 70 reviewed reports and commentaries. His work has been cited 28,000 times (as of Dec 2023).

His most recent book is Trusting judgements: how to get the best out of experts which appeared through Cambridge University Press in 2015.

The standard author abbreviation Burgman is used to indicate this person as the author when citing a botanical name.

== Honours ==
- Winner of the 2005 Eureka Prize for Biodiversity Research
- Fellow of the Australia Academy of Science (elected 2006)
- Royal Society of Victoria Medal for Scientific Excellence in the Biological Sciences (2013)
- Society for Conservation Biology Distinguished Service Award
- Research.com Ecology and Evolution in United Kingdom Leader Award (2023)
