= Kristen Marhaver =

American marine biologist

- Born: 1982 (age 43–44)
- Education: Georgia Institute of Technology
- Alma mater: Scripps Institution of Oceanography
- Scientific career
- Fields: Coral ecology
- Workplaces: CARMABI Marine Research Station
- Thesis: The Ecology of Coral-Microbe Interactions (2010)
- Doctoral advisor: Stuart A. Sandin
- Website: www.marhaverlab.com

Kristen Marhaver (born 1982 in Wichita, Kansas) is a marine biologist studying coral reefs and specializing in coral ecology, reproduction, and conservation. Marhaver is a senior scientist at CARMABI (Caribbean Research and Management of Biodiversity) Marine Research Station. Marhaver was part of the group of scientists that successfully used frozen Elkhorn coral sperm to fertilize live coral eggs to raise the first lab-reared juveniles in nurseries. Some of the sperm and eggs were from geographically isolated corals of the same species. Their success allows for the possibility of breeding corals to be more resistant to increasing ocean water temperatures by breeding corals that already survive at warmer temperatures with those that live at colder temperatures.

== Education ==
Marhaver received a Bachelor of Sciences (B.S.) in Applied Biology from Georgia Institute of Technology. Marhaver received a Doctor of Philosophy (Ph.D.) in Marine Biology from the Center for Marine Biodiversity and Conservation at Scripps Institution of Oceanography. Marhaver was a NSF Postdoctoral Research Fellow studying coral ecology and reproduction at the CARMABI (Caribbean Research and Management of Biodiversity) Marine Research Station.

== Career ==
Marhaver is a coral biologist researching how corals live and reproduce. Her work has been funded five times by the NSF, the Paul G. Allen Family Foundation, National Geographic and WINGS WorldQuest.

Marhaver is passionate about science communication and has done two TED talks (2015 and 2017) on corals and coral reef restoration. Her work has been by NPR, BBC, The Atlantic and Popular Science. As of October 2019, Marhaver has a Google scholar h-index of 10.

== Selected publications ==
- Vasquez Kuntz, K. L., Kitchen, S. A., Conn, T. L., Vohsen, S. A., Chan, A. N., Vermeij, M. J. A., Page, C., Marhaver, K. L., Baums, I. B. 2022. Inheritance of somatic mutations by animal offspring. Science Advances 8 (35). DOI:10.1126/sciadv.abn0707
- Hagedorn, M., Page, C. A., O'Neil, K. L., Flores, D. M., Tichy, L., Conn, T., Chamberland, V. F., Lager, C., Zuchowicz, N., Lohr, K., Blackburn, H., Vardi, T., Moore, J., Moore, T., Baums, I. B., Vermeij, M. J. A., Marhaver, K. L. 2021. Assisted gene flow using cryopreserved sperm in critically endangered coral. Applied Biological Sciences 118 (38) e2110559118.
- Barott, K. L., Rodriguez‐Brito, B., Janouškovec, J., Marhaver, K. L., Smith, J. E., Keeling P., Rohwer, F. L. 2011. Microbial diversity associated with four functional groups of benthic reef algae and the reef‐building coral Montastraea annularis. Environmental microbiology 13 (5), 1192–1204.
- Vermeij, M. J.A., Marhaver, K. L., Huijbers, C. M., Nagelkerken, I., Simpson, S. D. 2010. Coral larvae move toward reef sounds. PLOS ONE 5 (5), e10660.
- Marhaver, K. L., Edwards, R. A., Rohwer, F. 2008. Viral communities associated with healthy and bleaching corals. Environmental microbiology 10 (9), 2277–2286.
- Barott, K. L., Rodriguez-Mueller, B., Youle, M., Marhaver, K. L., Vermeij, M. J.A., Smith, J. E., Rohwer, F. L. 2011. Microbial to reef scale interactions between the reef-building coral Montastraea annularis and benthic algae. Proceedings of the Royal Society B: Biological Sciences 279 (1733), 1655–1664.
- Marhaver, K. L., Vermeij, M. J.A., Rohwer, F., Sandin, S. A. 2013. Janzen‐Connell effects in a broadcast‐spawning Caribbean coral: distance‐dependent survival of larvae and settlers. Ecology 94 (1), 146–160.

== Awards and honors ==
- TED Senior Fellow.
- National Geographic Explorer 2019.
- WINGS WorldQuest Women of Discovery Fellow.
- 2016 WINGS WorldQuest Women of Discovery Sea Award recipient.
- World Economic Forum Young Scientist.
