= Terrie Williams (scientist) =

American marine biologist

Terrie M. Williams
- Education: Rutgers University (PhD)
- Occupations: Marine biologist, ecophysiologist
- Employer: University of California Santa Cruz
- Known for: Study of Weddell seals
- Awards: Women of Discovery Award

Terrie Williams is a marine biologist and ecophysiologist who studies seals, dolphins, whales, and other marine life. She is currently a professor of ecology and evolutionary biology at the University of California Santa Cruz.

== Early life and education ==
Williams grew up in New Jersey. She earned both a master's degree and a PhD in ecophysiology and exercise physiology from Rutgers University. She completed her post-doctoral studies at the San Diego Zoological Society and the Scripps Institution of Oceanography. Williams was originally interested in medicine but decided to pursue degrees in exercise physiology upon realization that animals were capable of “extraordinary feats of athleticism and disease resistance” compared to humans.

== Career ==
Williams has studied Weddell seals across the course of her career, including how the seals navigate, searching for evidence of geomagnetic perception. Williams has also pioneered techniques on how to study wild seals without resorting to animal sedation. In addition to seals, Williams has studied both the diving physiology of both dolphins and narwhals, using sensors to measure the animals' heart rate, depth, and acceleration.

In the aftermath of the Exxon Valdez oil spill, Williams directed the Valdez Sea Otter Rescue Center, in addition to studying the spill's effects on other mammals and sea birds.

In 2013, Williams wrote a book about efforts to save an abandoned monk seal entitled The Odyssey of KP2: An Orphan Seal, a Marine Biologist, and the Fight to Save a Species. The seal was the youngest monk seal ever brought to the mainland United States. Bob Kustra praised the book for the insight it provided into the rescue efforts for a young seal.

After the outbreak of the COVID-19 pandemic, Williams explored the connections between COVID's effects on people and the "many physiological adaptations that have enabled marine mammals to tolerate low oxygen levels during dives".

Williams is currently a professor of ecology and evolutionary biology at the University of California Santa Cruz. Williams co-founded the Center for Ocean Health at Long Marine Lab. She is also the director of the Center for Marine Mammal Research and Conservation at the University of California Santa Cruz.

== Awards and honors ==
- In 2002, Discover magazine recognized Williams as one of the 50 most important women in science for her work on the physiology of marine mammals
- In 2005, USGS Antarctic site designation 18777, Terrie Bluff on Ross Island, was named in honor of Williams for her research on Weddell seals
- In 2007, Williams won the Women of Discovery Awards for her research into Weddell seals in the Antarctic
- In 2024, Williams received the Daniel Giraud Elliot Medal from the National Academy of Sciences for her work on marine mammal conservation

== Bibliography ==
- The Hunter's Breath: On Expedition with the Weddell Seals of the Antarctic. M. Evans and Company (2004). ISBN 9781590770283
- The Odyssey of KP2: An Orphan Seal, a Marine Biologist, and the Fight To Save a Species. Penguin Publishing Group (2013). ISBN 9780143123521

== Sources ==
- "Terrie Bluff", Geographic Names Information System, United States Geological Survey, United States Department of the Interior
