= Kate Jackson (author) =

Canadian herpetologist and author

- Born: 14 February 1972 (age 54); Toronto, Canada
- Education: Harvard
- Occupation: Herpetologist

Kate Jackson (born 14 February 1972) is a Canadian herpetologist who specializes in the study of venomous snakes in Central Africa. She earned her PhD from Harvard in 2002. In her dissertation she concluded that a venom-delivery system evolved during the Miocene era, approximately 25 million years ago. And from there three separate, more sophisticated, apparatuses developed.

== Early life ==
Jackson was born in Toronto on 14 February 1972. She credits her first encounter with a snake at the age of 5, as the inspiration for her career. She attended Dalhousie University for a year before transferring to the University of Toronto to study herpetology. She graduated with honors in 1994. Her first trip to the region was in 1997. Jackson took an internship at the Smithsonian Institution and traveled to the Republic of Congo, starting her trip in Brazzaville. She worked in Northern Congo, but she had to cut her research trip short when a scrape on her leg became infected and she had to be evacuated for treatment in Cameroon. Despite the early end, she collected several amphibian and reptile species, seven of which had never been collected in Congo before.

She received funding from the Smithsonian to return to the Republic of Congo in 2005 to continue her research. The trip was difficult, due to flooding in the area, but she collected 130 species, including a six-foot long water cobra that she carried in her backpack because they did not have a bag large enough for it.

In 2009 she was a finalist for the Washington State Book Award in the history/biography category for her book on her work in Congo: Mean and Lowly Things: Snakes, Science, and Survival in the Congo. Around the same time took a sabbatical to diagnosis and recover from transverse myelitis, a neurological condition caused by a virus in the spine, mostly likely picked up on one of her African expeditions. Spinal damage had her using a wheelchair for a time.

Jackson discovered a new species of snake with a team in 2015. It was named 'Radford's House Snake' and is only found in the Albertine Rift area of Africa. Jackson is currently working as a professor at Whitman College in Washington State. She teaches the only course on herpetology offered at the college, and manages the amphibian and reptile collection.

== Awards ==
- 2011 Women of Discovery Award for Courage, WINGS WorldQuest
