= Irina Nikolaeva =

Linguist and academic researcher

Irina Alekseevna Nikolaeva FBA (b. 1962) is a linguist and Emeritus Professor of Linguistics at the SOAS University of London.

== Biography ==
Nikolaeva gained her PhD from the University of Leiden in 1999. She worked at the University of Konstanz and the University of Oxford before joining SOAS in 2007 as a Lecturer. She was appointed Professor of Linguistics in 2012 and Emeritus Professor in 2020. She was awarded the Humanity Award at the 2008 Women of Discovery Awards. She was elected as a fellow of the British Academy in 2019.

== Select publications ==
- Nikolaeva, I. 2020. Yukaghir morphology in a historical and comparative perspective. München: Lincom GmbH.
- Nikolaeva, I. and Spencer, A. 2019. Mixed categories: The Morphosyntax of noun modification. Cambridge: Cambridge University Press.
- Nikolaeva, I. 2014. A grammar of Tundra Nenets. Berlin: Mouton de Gruyter.
- Ackerman, F. and Nikolaeva, I. 2013. Descriptive typology and linguistics theory: a study in the morphosyntax of relative clauses. Stanford: CSLI.
- Dalrymple, M.and *Nikolaeva, I. 2011. Objects and information structure. Cambridge: Cambridge University Press.
