= Rosa Vásquez Espinoza =

Peruvian chemical biologist and conservationist

- Rosa Vásquez Espinoza In 2025
- Born: Peru
- Education: Tennessee Tech; University of Michigan
- Scientific career
- Fields: Chemical biology, conservation
- Workplaces: Amazon Research Internacional

Rosa Vásquez Espinoza is a Peruvian chemical biologist and conservationist who founded Amazon Research Internacional, an organization focused on biodiversity research and conservation in the Amazon rainforest. Her work integrates traditional ecological knowledge with modern science, emphasizing sustainable practices and community collaboration. In 2026, she was named a WINGS Woman of Discovery.

== Early life and education ==
Rosa Vásquez Espinoza was born in Peru, with family roots in both the Andes and the Amazon rainforest. Her upbringing was influenced by her grandmother, a traditional healer in the Andes who relied on medicinal plants to create remedies. This early exposure to natural medicine and cultural traditions inspired Vásquez Espinoza and later influenced her scientific career.

Vásquez Espinoza attended school in Lima, but spent her summers in the Amazon and Andes, experiencing rural life and interacting with the local biodiversity. She received a scholarship to attend Tennessee Tech, where she earned a B.S. in biology and chemistry in 2015. She completed a Ph.D. in chemical biology from the University of Michigan.

From 2016 to 2022, Vásquez Espinoza worked in the life science laboratory at the University of Michigan under David H. Sherman, including as a postdoctoral researcher. In 2019, she joined a scientific expedition to the Shanay-timpishka to study its unique ecosystem. During the trip, she collected samples of water, sediment, and microbes, documenting environmental conditions such as temperature and sunlight to better understand the microorganisms thriving in the river’s extreme heat.

== Career ==
Vásquez Espinoza is a chemical biologist whose work centers on exploring biodiversity in extreme ecosystems, particularly the Amazon rainforest. Her research focuses on microorganisms and stingless bees, examining their ecological roles and potential applications in medicine and conservation. She founded Amazon Research Internacional, an institute dedicated to collaborative research and the integration of traditional knowledge with modern science.

Vásquez Espinoza's projects include mapping stingless bee populations and studying their honey's chemical properties, which have shown potential medicinal benefits. She collaborates with Indigenous communities, incorporating their knowledge and practices into conservation strategies. Her partnerships extend to academic institutions and policymakers, focusing on biodiversity preservation and sustainability.

Vásquez Espinoza has participated in initiatives to address the impacts of deforestation, climate change, and environmental pollutants on the Amazon's ecosystem. She has contributed to legislative efforts advocating for the protection of stingless bees in Peru, aiming to enhance conservation and support local economies. In 2024, she was listed on BBC 100 Women.
