= Vera Metcalf =

Alaskan educator and advocate

Vera Kingeekuk Metcalf (born 1951) is an educator and advocate known for her work in the preservation of the traditions and language of Alaska Native people. In 2019, she was inducted into the Alaska Women's Hall of Fame.

== Early life and education ==
Metcalf was born in Sivungaq (Savoonga) on St. Lawrence Island, Alaska. During her schooling on the island, she served as a teacher's aide, and translated lessons into Yupik to share with the students in the class. In 1991, Metcalf earned her bachelor's degree from the University of Alaska Fairbanks.

== Career ==
While working for the Bering Straits Foundation, Metcalf worked on the repatriation of remains held by the Fairbanks Museum and Smithsonian Institution. Through her work, almost 1000 remains were returned to St. Lawrence Island under the Native American Graves Protection and Repatriation Act.

In 2002, Metcalf was named as the head of the Eskimo Walrus Commission, and in that role she works to maintain the rights of subsistence hunting of walrus and the carving of walrus ivory by members of the Alaskan Native community. She also shares knowledge on how modes of transportation can harm walrus, including airplanes and ship traffic. Metcalf tracks the magnitude of the walrus harvest, which is important as changes in sea ice alters the ability to hunt and results in decreased harvesting of walruses needed for food. In a 2021 interview, she described the challenges of harvesting walrus, and noted that she speaks for the community around in her work, and not about herself. Metcalf was appointed to the United States Arctic Research Commission President George W. Bush in 2006.

In 2015, Metcalf worked with the United States Department of State to establish visa-free travel across the Bering Strait to allow people in the region to more easily visit family members in the region.

Metcalf shares her Indigenous knowledge of the ocean, and uses public events to emphasize the need for local partners in understanding environmental impacts of climate change. She is a member of the Innuit Circumpolar Council, and is working to increase knowledge on Indigenous languages such as the Yupik language she speaks. She is part of a research project funded in 2021 by the United States' National Science Foundation which will examine how changes in sea ice impact marine mammals and subsistence hunting.

== Awards and honors ==
In 2003, the Before Columbus Foundation awarded an American Book Award to Metcalf and co-authors for their book Akuzilleput igaqullghet = Our words put to paper. In 2008, Metcalf received the Sea Award, a Women of Discovery Award. In 2019, Metcalf was elected to the Alaska Women's Hall of Fame based on a nomination from Alice Green.

== Selected publications ==
- Krupnik, Igor; Krutak, Lars F.; Walunga, Willis; Metcalf, Vera (2002). Akuzilleput igaqullghet = Our words put to paper : sourcebook in St. Lawrence Island heritage and history – via library.si.edu.
- Metcalf, Vera; Robards, Martin (2008). "Sustaining a Healthy Human-Walrus Relationship in a Dynamic Environment: Challenges for Comanagement". Ecological Applications. 18 (2): S148–S156. doi:10.1890/06-0642.1. ISSN 1051-0761. JSTOR 40062162. PMID 18494368.
- Metcalf, Vera K. (2021). "Nangaghneghput – our way of life". Frontiers in Ecology and the Environment. 19 (8): 427. doi:10.1002/fee.2409. ISSN 1540-9309. S2CID 244232293.
- Apassingok, Merle; Holland, Marika M.; Kelly, Brendan P.; Koch, Chelsea W.; Metcalf, Vera; Rookok, Bryan; Walsh, John (2024). "How does the changing marine environment affect hunters' access to Pacific walruses?". Arctic, Anatartic, and Apline Research. 56. doi:10.1080/15230430.2024.2367632.
- Metcalf, Vera; Apassingok, Daniel; Campbell, Iver; Gologergen, Arnold; Gologergen, Bivers; Noongwook, Edwin; Huntington, Henry P.; Garlich-Miller, Joel L.; Johnson, Devin L. (2025). "Co-producing knowledge about the Pacific walrus and climate change". Arctic Science. 11: 1–13. doi:10.1139/as-2024-0061.
