= Asha de Vos =

Sri Lankan marine biologist (born 1979)

- ආශා ඩි වොස්
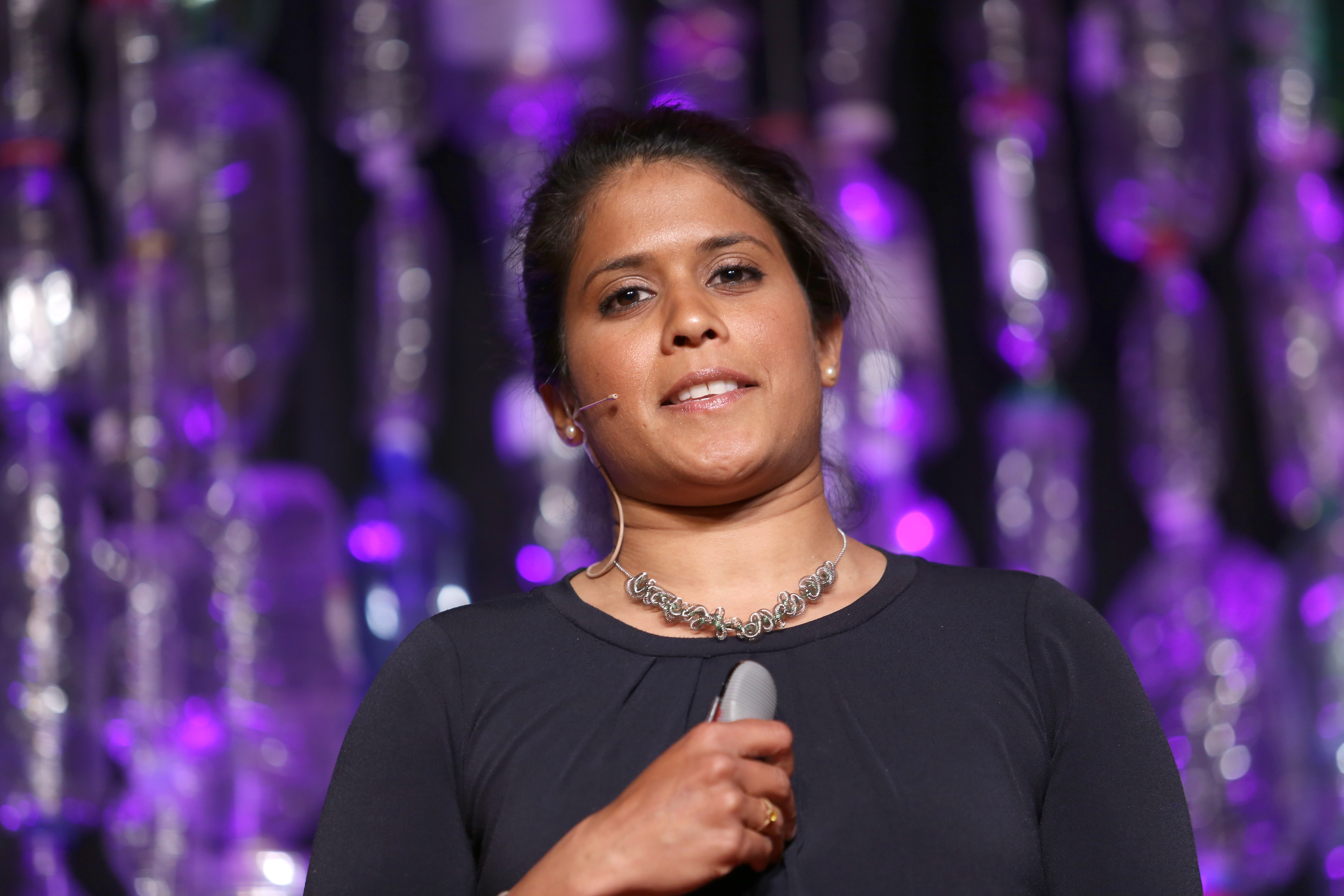
- Asha de Vos at TEDx Monterey 2013
- Born: 1979 (age 46–47); Sri Lanka
- Education: University of St. Andrews, University of Oxford, University of Western Australia
- Known for: The Blue Whale Project; Oceanswell
- Awards: TED Fellow; Women of Discovery Award; BBC 100 Women; 2020 Sea Hero of the Year
- Scientific career
- Fields: Marine biology
- Website: ashadevos.com

Asha de Vos (Sinhala: ආශා ඩි වොස්; born 1979) is a Sri Lankan marine biologist, ocean educator and pioneer of blue whale research within the northern Indian Ocean. She is known for her Blue Whale Project. She is a Senior TED Fellow and was chosen for a BBC 100 Women award in 2018. She is a National Geographic 2016 Emerging Explorer Grantee.

== Life and career ==
De Vos was born in 1979 in Sri Lanka. When she was six years old her parents would bring her second-hand National Geographic magazines. She would look through the pages and "imagine that that would be me one day – going places where no-one else would ever go and seeing things no-one else would ever see", inspiring her to dream of being an "adventure-scientist".

De Vos attended C.M.S. Ladies' College, Colombo and Colombo International School. She moved to Scotland for her undergraduate studies in marine and environmental biology at the University of St. Andrews. She gained her master's in integrative bio-sciences at the University of Oxford and a PhD from the University of Western Australia.

De Vos had served as a senior programme officer in the marine and coastal unit of the International Union for Conservation of Nature. She founded the Sri Lankan Blue Whale Project in 2008, which forms the first long-term study on blue whales within the northern Indian Ocean. She discovered through her research that an unrecognized unique population of blue whales, previously thought to migrate every year, stayed in waters near Sri Lanka year-round. Due to de Vos's research, the International Whaling Commission has designated Sri Lankan blue whales as a species in urgent need of conservation research and has started collaborating with the Sri Lankan government on whale ship strikes. De Vos is an invited member of the IUCN Species Survival Commission's Cetacean Specialist Group. She was a post-doctoral scholar at the University of California Santa Cruz and a guest blogger for National Geographic.

She is the founder and director of the non-profit Oceanswell, Sri Lanka's first marine conservation research and education organization. De Vos believes that the health and future of coastlines depend on local people. She argues that "parachute science", the practice of Western scientists collecting data in developing countries and then leaving without training or investing in the locals or region, is unsustainable and cripples conservation efforts. De Vos has also stated that women should define themselves by their capacity and not let their gender limit their potential.

De Vos is a TED Senior Fellow, a Duke University Global Fellow in Marine Conservation and has been selected as a Young Global Leader by the World Economic Forum. In 2013, she received the President's Award for Scientific Publications. In 2015, she was a Marine Conservation Action Fund Fellow and in 2016 she became a Pew Marine Fellow. In 2018, she received the WINGS WorldQuest Women of Discovery Sea Award. On 26 May 2018, she was awarded the Golden alumni award in the Professional Achievement category at the first edition of the British Council Golden Alumni Awards. Later in the year she joined the BBC 100 Women list. On 27 March 2019, de Vos was celebrated as one 12 Women Changemakers by the Sri Lanka parliament. In 2020, de Vos was named Sea Hero of the Year by Scuba Diving magazine.

In 2023, de Vos was a laureate of the Asian Scientist 100 by the Asian Scientist.

== See also ==
- Timeline of women in science
