= Marianne Greenwood =

Swedish photographer and author (1916–2006)

- Born: Marianne Hederström; 1916; Gällivare, Sweden
- Died: 2006 (aged 89–90); Antibes, France
- Known for: Photography

Marianne Greenwood (1916–2006) was a Swedish photographer and author.

== Biography ==
Greenwood was born Marianne Hederström in Gällivare, and raised in Kiruna and Skellefteå, all in northern Sweden.

Before the end of World War II Greenwood moved to Stockholm and studied at the art school of design. She then moved to Switzerland and the hotel school in Lausanne, and subsequently moved to Antibes where she became the "in-house photographer" for the Musée Picasso, photographing Picasso and his family and visitors such as Matisse, Chagall, Miró, and Léger. The authors Anais Nin, Robert Graves and Chester Himes were among her close friends. In Los Angeles she was also a friend of the film director Fritz Lang.

She worked with and had a long friendship with Evert Taube, the Swedish national troubadour and poet. Also the Swedish silversmith designer Torun Bülow-Hübe in Biot, France. For several decades she lived with indigenous people in the Americas, the Pacific Islands, in Papua New Guinea and parts of Asia. 30,000 of her photographs from this era are archived in the Ethnographical Museum in Stockholm.

Greenwood wrote and photographed for books and magazines in France, Germany, the United States, Sweden and other countries, and published books of her own work.

In 2005 Greenwood received a Women of Discovery Award for Lifetime Achievement from Wings Worldquest in New York.

In later years Greenwood lived in Antibes, France. She is buried in Stockholm, Sweden. A documentary film about Greenwood entitled "Catch the Moment" premiered in 2008, and has been broadcast on public service television in Denmark, Iceland, Norway and Sweden.

== Publications ==
- "The Tattooed Heart of Livingstone" by Marianne Greenwood, (Stein & Day New York 1965, W.H. Allen London 1965)
- "Reise in meinem Adreßbuch" (German) Text & photo by Marianne Greenwood, (Rowohlt Hamburg 1991)
- "Mein Indianischer Sommer" (German) Text & photo by Marianne Greenwood. (Bertelsmann München 1975)
- "Vignette pour les vignerons" (French) Text Jacques Prévert, Photo Marianne Greenwood, Illustrations Françoise Gilot. (Falaize Paris 1951, Crédit Agricole 1993, La Chambre d’échos Paris 2014)
- "Picasso à Musée d'Antibes" (French) Text André Verdet, Photo Marianne Greenwood (Falaize Paris 1954)
- "Picasso in Antibes" Text Dor de la Souchère, Photo Marianne Greenwood (Lund Humphries London, Hazan Paris, Prestel Verlag Munich, Pantheon Books New York 1960
- "Mexico by Erwin Fieger" Text Marianne Greenwood, Photo Erwin Fieger (Accidentia Verlag Düsseldorf 1974, Universe Books New York 1974)
- "Varför gråter puman?" (Why the Puma Cries) (Swedish, Norwegian and Finnish) Text and photo Marianne Greenwood (Trevi Stockholm 1984, Bra Böcker Höganäs 1984)
