= Marilyn Bridges =

American photographer

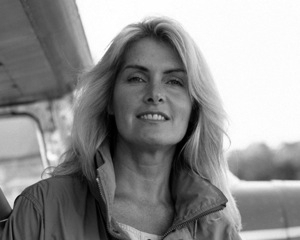
- Marilyn Bridges, 2003
- Born: 1948 (age 77–78)
- Education: Rochester Institute of Technology
- Known for: Aerial photography
- Website: www.marilynbridges.com

Marilyn Christine Bridges (born 1948) is an American photographer noted for her fine art black and white aerial photographs of extraordinary ancient and modern landscapes. She has photographed sacred and secular sites in over 20 countries, including Peru, Mexico, France, Britain, Egypt, Greece, Turkey, Australia, Namibia, Indonesia and India. Bridges is a licensed pilot and a Fellow of the Explorers Club. She lives in New York.

Bridges' work has been exhibited in over 300 museums and galleries, including solo exhibitions at the Smithsonian Institution in Washington DC, the Moscow House of Photography in Russia, the Field Museum of Natural History in Chicago, the George Eastman House in Rochester, the Royal Ontario Museum in Toronto, and the International Center of Photography in New York. Museums with extensive collections of her work include the Center for Creative Photography in Tucson, the International Center of Photography in New York, the Museum of Modern Art in New York, the Penn Museum in Philadelphia, and the Musée de la Photographie à Charleroi in Belgium. Her photographs have been published in major magazines, including Vanity Fair, Condé Nast Traveler, Time, Life, Archaeology, Smithsonian and The New York Times Magazine. She is the author of eight books.

== Biography ==
Marilyn Bridges studied photography at the Rochester Institute of Technology (RIT), where she earned a Bachelor of Fine Arts (1979) and a Master of Fine Arts (1981).

She began her career in aerial photography in 1976 in the Peruvian desert. Bridges hired a small airplane to fly over the mysterious Nazca Lines, the largest concentration of earth drawings in the world. “At RIT she printed her Peruvian negatives as her first school project. Her technique was not yet polished, but the deep shadows, the eloquent light, and sense of time standing unnaturally still were present in every print. Bridges already had her style ... Cornell Capa, the dean of American photography, saw her work, admired it, and the American Museum of Natural History in New York gave her an exhibition.”

In 1982, after receiving a Guggenheim Fellowship, Bridges flew in a small single-engine Cessna from New York to the Yucatán, where she photographed ancient Mayan sites, some still partially overgrown by the dense jungle. Many of these photographs appeared in her 1986 book Markings: Aerial Views of Sacred Landscapes, which also includes photographs of Nazca, Native American archaeological sites, and megalithic monuments in Britain and Brittany. Bridges returned to Peru on a Fulbright Scholarship and published many of the resulting photographs in her 1991 book Planet Peru: An Aerial Journey Through a Timeless Land. In Egypt in 1993-94 she obtained unusual permission to fly over the Valley of the Kings and along the Nile. Leaning out of an old Russian military helicopter, she photographed dozens of ancient sites. The result was a unique collection of aerial photographs in her 1996 book Egypt: Antiquities from Above. Closer to home Bridges photographed ancient and contemporary sites across the United States, from Pre-Columbian mounds in the Midwest and geoglyphs in California, to lava flows in Hawaii and glaciers in Alaska. Many of these photographs are in her 1997 book This Land is Your Land: Across America by Air. Bridges also received a grant from the French government to make aerial photographs of historical and contemporary sites in the Calais region to document the changing environment in connection with the Channel Tunnel, as seen in her 1995 book Vue d’Oiseau. She received a similar grant from the Belgian government to document the landscape of Wallonia from the air, resulting in the 1999 book Vol au-dessus de la Wallonie. Both collections of photographs appeared in solo exhibitions in major museums throughout Europe. She has also photographed the ruins of classical cities and temples in Greece and Turkey. In 2009, she flew over Minoan sites in Crete, and the Onassis Foundation exhibited these photographs in New York City.

Bridges uses a medium format film camera, and takes photographs from a small airplane or helicopter with the door removed, usually from an altitude of 300 to 1000 feet. Her photographic prints are silver gelatin, and selenium toned.

== Awards and honors ==
- Guggenheim Fellowship (in Yucatán), 1982
- CAPS Grant, 1983
- National Endowment for the Arts Fellowship, 1984
- Elected Fellow of the Explorers Club, 1988
- Fulbright American Scholars Grant (in Peru), 1988–9
- Eastman Kodak Photography Grant, 1990
- Medal of Arles, Recontres Internationals de la Photographie, Arles, France, 1991
- Mission Photographique Transmanche Grant (in France), 1995
- Musée de la Photographie à Charleroi, Grant (in Belgium) 1999
- Wings Trust, Women of Discovery Award, 2003
- Institute for Aegean Prehistory Grant (in Crete), 2009

== Publications ==
- Markings: Aerial Views of Sacred Landscapes (New York: Aperture, Inc., 1986; 2nd Edition, 1990). German Edition: Für die Götter: Luftaufnahmen heiliger Landschaften (Frankfurt: Zweitausandendeins, 1990)
- The Sacred & Secular: A Decade of Aerial Photography (New York: International Center of Photography, 1990)
- Planet Peru: An Aerial Journey Through A Timeless Land (New York: Aperture, Inc., 1991). German Edition: Planet Peru: Reise über ein zeitlosen Land (Frankfurt: Zweitausendeins, 1991)
- Vue d'oiseau, la mission photographique transmanche (Douchy, France: Centre Regional de la Photographie, 1996)
- Egypt: Antiquities from Above (Boston: Bulfinch Press, Little Brown & Co., 1996). German Edition: Ägypten: das Reich der Pharaonen aus der Luft betrachtet (Munich: Kindler, 1996). French Edition: L'Egypte vue du ciel (Paris: Editions du Seuil)
- This Land Is Your Land: Across America by Air (New York: Aperture, 1997)
- Vol au-dessus de la Wallonie (Charleroi, Belgium: Editions MET, Musée de la photographie à Charleroi, 1999)
- Flights Through Time (Revere, Pennsylvania: Lodima Press, 2007)
- In the footsteps of Alexander: An aerial adventure. Explorers Club Journal 85(3), pg 44-53 (2007)
