= Marla Spivak =

American entomologist

- Born: 1955 (age 70–71); Denver, Colorado
- Education: California State Polytechnic University, Humboldt, University of Kansas
- Known for: Bee research
- Awards: MacArthur Fellowship, Siehl Prize for Excellence in Agriculture, Women of Discovery Award, Fellow of the Entomological Society of America, 2003 Hambleton Award from the Eastern Apicultural Society
- Scientific career
- Fields: entomology
- Workplaces: University of Minnesota
- Doctoral advisor: Dr. Orley (Chip) Taylor
- Other academic advisors: Dr. Gloria Degrandi-Hoffman and Dr. Martha Gilliam
- Website: beelab.umn.edu

Marla Spivak (born 1955) is an American entomologist, and Distinguished McKnight University Professor at the University of Minnesota specializing in apiculture and social insects.

== Career and research ==
Spivak graduated with a B.A. from Humboldt State University and a Ph.D. from the University of Kansas. She is particularly well known for her work breeding lines of honey bees that detect and quickly remove diseased larvae and pupae, which is called hygienic behavior. Spivak has extensively studied the causes and impacts of Colony Collapse Disorder (CCD), a phenomenon where honey bee hives are abandoned by their worker bees. She attributes CCD to a combination of factors, including parasites, diseases, poor nutrition, pesticide poisonings, and habitat loss. Her research aims to identify stress factors that compromise bee immune systems and develop methods to mitigate these stresses. She was instrumental in setting up the first bee Tech-Transfer Team in the United States, which continues to help honey bee queen breeders select for disease resistance traits. More recently, she has begun studying the role of resins, which bees collect and mix with wax to make propolis coatings on the inside of their hives, as an example of honey bee social immunity. Her lab also studies the effect of the surrounding landscape on the health and nutrition of both honey bees and native bees.

== Awards ==
She was awarded a MacArthur Fellowship grant in 2010 for her work with honey bees. After receiving the MacArthur grant, she started an organization called the Bee Squad, which works to help beekeepers and people in the Twin Cities community improve the health of bee pollinators. In 2015, she won the Distinguished Service Award from the Minnesota AgriGrowth Council. In 2016, she won the Siehl Prize for Excellence in Agriculture (category: Knowledge) for her many contributions to understanding bee biology and threats to bee health and a Women of Discovery Award from Wings Worldquest, honoring her pioneering work promoting bee health and conservation. Spivak was elected a Fellow of the Entomological Society of America in 2017. In 2020 a former student of Spivak's, bee taxonomist Joel Gardner, named a species of sweat bee Lasioglossum spivakae in her honor.

== Works ==
- Spivak, M.; Reuter, G.S.; Minnesota Extension Service (2006). Successful Queen Rearing: Short Course. University of Minnesota.
- Spivak, M.; Reuter, G.S.; Minnesota Extension Service (2006). Honeybee Diseases and Pests. University of Minnesota, Department of Entomology and Minnesota Extension Service.
- Lee-Mäder, E.; Spivak, M.; Evans, E. (2010). Managing Alternative Pollinators: A Handbook for Beekeepers, Growers, and Conservationists. NRAES (Collection). Sustainable Agriculture Research and Education. ISBN 978-1-933395-20-3.
- Spivak, M.; Fletcher, D.J.C.; Breed, M.D. (2019). The African Honey Bee. Westview studies in insect biology. Taylor & Francis Group. ISBN 978-0-367-28999-7.
