= Oceanswell =

Sri Lankan non-governmental organisation

- Formation: 2017
- Founder: Asha de Vos
- Type: Non-governmental Organization
- Purpose: Marine Conservation
- Location: Sri Lanka
- Methods: Research, Awareness, Citizen science, Education, Youth engagement
- Fields: Marine biology
- Award: Goodwill Champion 2020 - World Economic Forum in Davos
- Website: oceanswell.org

Oceanswell is Sri Lanka's first marine conservation and research education organisation and was founded by marine biologist Asha de Vos.

== Projects ==
=== The Blue Whale Project ===
Oceanswell is known for the Blue Whale Project which is the first long-term study on blue whales in the Northern Indian Ocean. The project focuses on the conservation of blue whales from threats such as ship strikes. De Vos founded the Blue Whale Project which is the flagship project of Oceanswell.

=== Conservation research ===
Research includes the COVID-19 and Fisheries Project, natural variability of Mount Lavinia Beach, effectiveness of shark fishing bans and advocacy research against beach nourishments conducted without Environmental Impact Assessments. Recent publications advocate against 'parachute science' which is practice of Western scientists collecting data in developing countries and leaving without training in the region.

=== Education and outreach ===
Oceanswell conducts educational sessions for school children, skill building courses, marine conservation field courses, monthly gatherings for individuals of different fields to discuss marine conservation issues, rescues stranded marine animals and conducts awareness on species.

== Awards ==
Honoured as a Goodwill Champion at the 2020 World Economic Forum in Davos.
