= Emma Camp =

English Australian marine biologist

- Born: 1987 (age 38–39); Essex, England
- Citizenship: English Australian
- Education: Belmont Abbey College (B.Sc.); Sheffield Hallam University (M.Sc.); University of Essex (Ph.D.)
- Known for: Coral reef
- Website: emmafcamp.com

Emma Frances Camp (born 1987) is an English Australian marine biologist, whose research focuses on coral reef resilience and the ability of corals to survive in extreme environmental conditions. She leads the Future Reefs research program at the University of Technology Sydney. She is also a co-founder and lead scientist of the Coral Nurture Program. Camp has also spoken about the participation of women in STEM fields.

== Early life and education ==
Camp was born in 1987 in Essex, England. She is a dual British and Australian citizen. During her early years at St Martins secondary school, she played competitive basketball, representing England and Great Britain at youth level and serving as captain of the University of Essex team, the Essex Blades.

In 2004, Camp received her first international cap against Iceland. She attended Belmont Abbey College in Belmont, North Carolina, where she studied environmental science and chemistry and graduated with a BSc (Hons). She was also awarded a sports scholarship.

In 2011, she studied for an MSc in Environmental Management and Business at Sheffield Hallam University. During this time, she also played for Sheffield Hatters Basketball club.

In 2013, Camp began working at the Central Caribbean Marine Institute in the Cayman Islands. During this period, she also began a PhD in marine biology at the University of Essex, where her research examined the biogeochemistry of reef-associated habitats on coral reefs. In 2014, she returned to England and continued her doctoral studies while playing for the University of Essex women’s basketball team on a sports scholarship. She captained the team to a national championship, and the university later retired her number 14 jersey in recognition of her contributions to the program.

== Career ==
In early 2016, Camp was awarded an Endeavour Fellowship and moved to the University of Technology Sydney to continue her research. Her work has examined reef-associated environments, including mangrove lagoons, where some corals are able to survive under conditions such as elevated temperatures and reduced oxygen levels. These environments have remained a focus of her research on coral resilience.

Camp is a National Geographic Explorer. In 2019, she was named a Young Leader for the Sustainable Development Goals by the United Nations. Her research has examined metabolic interactions between corals and their symbiotic partners and the use of phenotyping methods to identify corals with greater tolerance to environmental stress for reef restoration.

In 2018, Camp co-founded the Coral Nurture Program, a tourism–science partnership focused on coral reef stewardship on the Goat Barrier Reef. She serves as the program’s lead scientist. In 2023, she became team leader of the Future Reefs research group at the University of Technology Sydney. The group studies how environmental change influences coral health, resilience, and survival across different reef environments.

Camp has served as a scientific advisor to SeaLegacy and as an ambassador for Coral Catch. In addition to her research, she has spoken about the participation of women in STEM fields and was named an inaugural STEM Game Changer by the Australian Academy of Science. Camp has also participated in science communication initiatives and appeared in documentary projects, including the Perpetual Planet: Heroes of the Ocean produced by National Geographic.

== Documentary ==
- Perpetual Planet: Heroes of the Oceans 2021 on NAT GEO TV

== Notable publications ==
- 'Rapid coral decay is associated with marine heatwave mortality events on reefs', 2019, Vol:19, Cited by 155, William P Leggat, Camp F Camp, David J Suggett, Scott F Heron, Alexander J Fordyce, Stephanie Gardner, Lachlan Deakin, Michael Turner, Levi J Beeching, Unnikrishnan Kuzhiumparambil, C Mark Eakin, Tracy D Ainsworth
- 'The Future of Coral Reefs Subject to Rapid Climate Change: Lessons from Natural Extreme Environments', 2018, vol:5, Cited by 228, DJ Suggett EF Camp, V Schoepf, PJ Mumby, LA Hardtke, R Rodolfo-Metalpa, DJ Smith
- 'Reef-building corals thrive within hot-acidified and deoxygenated waters', 2017, Vol:7, cited by 113, pages: 2434, Camp F Camp, Matthew R Nitschke, Riccardo Rodolfo-Metalpa, Fanny Houlbreque, Stephanie G Gardner, David J Smith, Marco Zampighi, David J Suggett
- 'Influence of conservation education dive briefings as a management tool on the timing and nature of recreational SCUBA diving impacts on coral reefs', 2012, Vol:61, pages:30-37, Cited by 132, Camp Camp, Douglas Fraser
- 'The other microeukaryotes of the coral reef microbiome', 2017, Vol:25, cited by 89, TD Ainsworth, AJ Fordyce, EF Camp

== Awards ==
Camp has received several awards and recognitions for her research on coral reef resilience. In 2019, she received the Rolex Awards for Enterprise for her project on coral reef restoration using heat-tolerant corals. In 2020, she was named a Next Generation Leader by Time and received the STEM Women Changemakers Award. In 2021, she was awarded the Macquarie University Eureka Prize for Outstanding Early Career Researcher, presented by the Australian Museum. In 2022, she was included on the Coral Champion List by the Lewis Pugh Foundation. In 2023, she received a Women of Discovery Award.
