= Stephen Warren (glaciologist) =

American atmospheric scientist and glaciologist

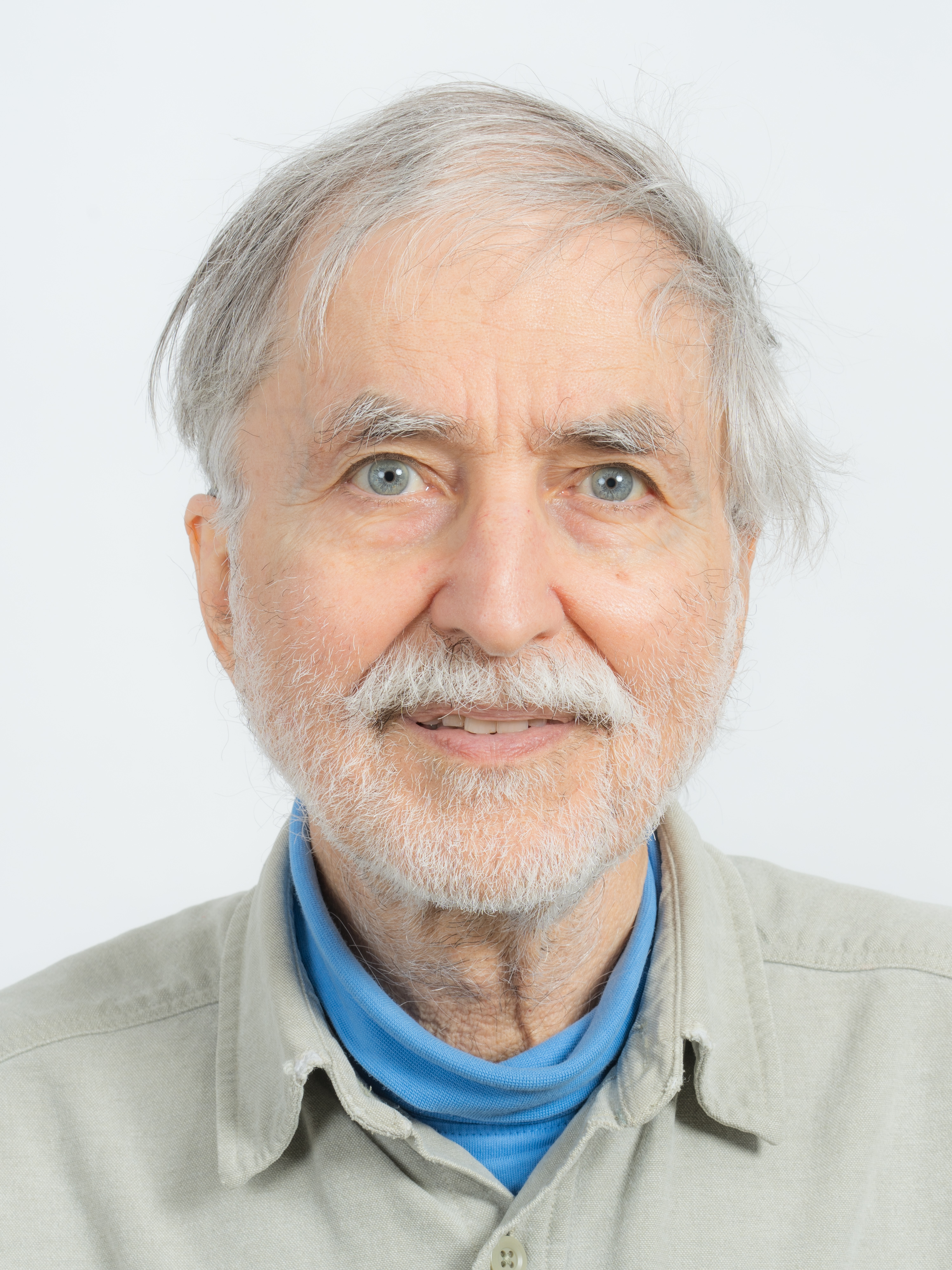
- Education: Cornell University; Harvard University
- Scientific career
- Fields: glaciology atmospheric physics
- Institutions: University of Washington, Seattle

Stephen Warren (born September 20, 1945) is an American atmospheric scientist and glaciologist. He is a professor emeritus of atmospheric sciences and of earth and space sciences at the University of Washington. He is known for his research on the interaction of solar radiation with snow, ice, and clouds, and for field studies in the Arctic and Antarctic. He has been named a Fellow of the American Geophysical Union, the American Meteorological Society, and the American Association for the Advancement of Science.

== Early life and education ==
Warren was born in Madison, Wisconsin, and grew up in Indiana. He earned a B.A. in chemistry, summa cum laude, from Cornell University in 1967 and a Ph.D. in physical chemistry from Harvard University in 1973. After graduate school he conducted postdoctoral research in protein crystallography at the Max Planck Institute for Medical Research in Heidelberg and at Brandeis University.

== Academic career ==
Warren shifted from biophysics to atmospheric science in 1978, working as a postdoctoral fellow at the National Center for Atmospheric Research and later at the Cooperative Institute for Research in Environmental Sciences at the University of Colorado. In 1982 he joined the faculty of the University of Washington, where he has remained; he is now professor emeritus. He also served as a member of the University of Washington's Astrobiology Program, as well as the Quaternary Research Center.

He held visiting positions at the Australian Antarctic Division, the Antarctic Cooperative Research Centre at the University of Tasmania, the National Institute of Polar Research in Tokyo, and the École Polytechnique Fédérale de Lausanne. In 1992, he was appointed Station Science Leader at the South Pole Station during a year-long Antarctic expedition.

== Research ==
Warren's work focuses on the optical properties of snow and ice, the climatic effects of clouds, and cryosphere–atmosphere interactions.

He has contributed to understanding the role of light-absorbing impurities in snow, the climatic significance of snow albedo, and the processes governing sea ice and glacier ice. His studies have also extended to paleoclimate, including the "Snowball Earth" hypothesis.

Warren conducted fieldwork across Antarctica, Greenland, the Southern Ocean, Siberia, Svalbard, China, Canada, and Alaska.

In Antarctica, he participated in expeditions to the South Pole, Vostok Station, Dome C, and the Transantarctic Mountains. In 2001 the U.S. Board on Geographic Names designated Warren Ridge in Antarctica in his honor.

His research included the origin of green icebergs, which he first studied in the late 1980s. His investigations suggested that iron oxides incorporated into marine ice beneath ice shelves are responsible for the unusual coloration, with implications for nutrient delivery to ocean ecosystems.
