= Thandiwe Mweetwa =

Zambian biologist

- Born: 1988 (age 37–38); Monze, Zambia
- Occupation: biologist

Thandiwe Mweetwa (born 1988 in Monze, Zambia) is a wildlife biologist and community educator focusing on lion conservation.

== Life ==
Mweetwa grew up in a small town in southern Zambia and moved to a small, rural village called Mfuwe. When she was 12 where she was introduced to wildlife biology. She graduated from University of British Columbia with a BSc in Applied Animal Biology and a Masters in Natural Resources Conservation from the University of Arizona. She currently serves as senior ecologist and community educator for the Zambian Carnivore Programme.

== Work in conservation ==
Mweetwa's work at the Zambian Carnivore Programme focuses on population dynamics and threats to lions and other carnivores in Zambia. She originally joined as an intern in 2009 and now her work focuses mainly on lions and wild dogs in the Luangwa Valley. In 2016, Mweetwa and her colleagues at the Zambian Carnivore Programme were featured in the BBC One documentary The Hunt, narrated by David Attenborough focusing on the group's efforts to protect African wild dogs. Mweetwa established the Women in Wildlife Conservation Training Programme in 2016 with the aim of inspiring local young women to consider careers in conservation. In 2016, Mweetwa was selected as a National Geographic Emerging Explorer. In 2018, Mweetwa received a Women of Discovery Award and received a grant from WINGS WorldQuest.
