= The SWARM Project =

Human reasoning bases research project

The Smartly-assembled Wiki-style Argument Marshalling (SWARM) Project is a research project, looking at how human reasoning can be improved. The project is based at the University of Melbourne, and is developing and testing a cloud-based platform and methods aimed at fundamental advancing in reasoning performance through crowdsourcing. The SWARM Project is part of the Crowdsourcing Evidence, Argumentation, Thinking and Evaluation (CREATE) Program managed by the Intelligence Advanced Research Projects Activity.
