= European Congress of Conservation Biology =

The European Congress of Conservation Biology (ECCB) is a series of professional meetings organised by the Society for Conservation Biology – Europe Section. The aim of ECCBs is to facilitate the exchange on conservation science and nature conservation practice and policy with the aim of promoting conservation of biological diversity in Europe. The congresses are opened by the environmental minister of the host country, attended by high level policy makers from the EC, and by prominent scientists, including Fellows of the Royal Society.

== Past meetings ==
- 1st ECCB − 2006, Eger, Hungary. Held with 1000 participants. Its subject "Diversity for Europe" reflecting the variability of Europe’s biology and culture, and also the diversity of ways nature conservation acts.
- 2nd ECCB − 2009, Prague, Czech Republic. Held with 1200 participants. Its main theme was "Conservation biology and beyond: from science to practice".
- 3rd ECCB − 2012, Glasgow, UK. Its main theme was "Conservation on the Edge".
- 4th ECCB − 2015, Montpellier, France. Its main theme was "Mission Biodiversity".
- 5th ECCB − 2018, Jyvaskyla, Finland. Its main theme was "Planetary Wellbeing".
- 6th ECCB − 2022, Prague, Czech Republic. Its main theme was " Biodiversity crisis in a changing world".
- 7th ECCB − 2024, Bologna, Italy. Its main theme will be " Biodiversity positive by 2030"
