= Ruthmery Pillco Huarcaya =

- Education: National University of Saint Anthony the Abbot; Queen Mary University of London; Royal Botanic Gardens, Kew
- Awards: National Geographic Explorer (2021); Disney Conservation Hero (2022); Women of Discovery Award (2024); Future for Nature Award (2025)
- Scientific career
- Fields: Conservation biology
- Workplaces: Conservación Amazónica (ACCA)

Ruthmery Pillco Huarcaya is a Peruvian conservation biologist whose work focuses on Andean wildlife, forest restoration, and biodiversity conservation. She has conducted research and operated conservation projects in Costa Rica and Peru. She was named a National Geographic Explorer in 2021 and received the Future for Nature Award in 2025.

== Early life and education ==
Pillco Huarcaya was raised in Paruro in the Cusco region of Peru. She has attributed her interest in biology to her family's engagement with reforestation projects and medicinal plants.

Pillco Huarcaya studied biology at the National University of Saint Anthony the Abbot in Cusco. While studying in university, she researched woolly monkeys and engaged in one year of fieldwork in Peru. She subsequently earned a master's degree in plant and fungal taxonomy, conservation, and biodiversity at the Queen Mary University of London and the Royal Botanic Gardens, Kew.

== Career ==
=== Early research and work in tropical forests ===
By 2017, Pillco Huarcaya worked on biodiversity conservation in Costa Rica, where she contributed to projects to conserve certain tree species on the Osa Peninsula. Her work focused on botanical inventories, seed collection, and forest restoration and germination efforts.

Her work in Costa Rica also involved assessing the conservation status of threatened tree species. She later returned to Peru to engage in Andean bear conservation.

In 2019, Pillco Huarcaya co-published a study that documented animal diversity in a high-elevation region of the Peruvian Andes through the use of camera trapping. The study examined the mammal community and raised discussions about conservation in the area.

=== Andean bear conservation in Peru ===
Two years later, Pillco Huarcaya joined Conservación Amazónica (ACCA) to contribute to Andean bear conservation in the Manu National Park region in southeastern Peru. During her tenure, she studied the ecology of Andean bears, monitored wildlife with camera traps, examined the diet of bears, and conducted conservation and environmental education to local communities.

=== Community engagement and conservation initiatives ===
Pillco Huarcaya has engaged in conservation work regarding environmental education and ecological research. In the Peruvian Andes, initiatives associated with her work have involved restoring vegetation native to the area, educating about Andean bears, and encouraging participation in wildlife conservation among children and local communities.

In 2023, she founded the Peruvian Wildlife Foundation, a nonprofit organization focused on the conservation of Andean ecosystems.

By 2024, her conservation activities associated with her work at the Wayqecha Biological Station included an interpretation center focused on Andean bears and a Conservation Ambassadors program for children and highland communities.

== Board memberships and awards ==
Pillco Huarcaya has served as a board member of the International Conservation Fund of Canada.

In 2021, Pillco Huarcaya was named a National Geographic Explorer and joined the Perpetual Planet Amazon Expedition to find Andean bears that would contribute to feeding water into the Amazon River basin. The next year, she was recognized as a Disney Conservation Hero for her conservation work.

Pillco Huarcaya was awarded the Women of Discovery award in 2024 and received the Future for Nature Award in 2025.
