= Kyle Hills =

Volcanic cones on Ross Island, Antarctica

- Location within Antarctica

Highest point
- Elevation: 2,600 m (8,500 ft)
- Prominence: <
- Coordinates: 77°30′S 169°2′E

Geography
- Location: Ross Island, Antarctica

The Kyle Hills (77°30′S 169°2′E) are a prominent group of volcanic cones, hills, ridges, and peaks that occupy the eastern part of Ross Island, Antarctica, between Mount Terror and Cape Crozier. The hills extend east–west for 8 nautical miles (15 km), rising from sea level at Cape Crozier to about 2,600 metres (8,500 ft) in Mount McIntosh at the western end of the group. Local relief of features is on the order of 200 metres (660 ft).

== Name ==
Named by United States Advisory Committee on Antarctic Names (US-ACAN) (2000) after Philip R. Kyle, Professor of Geochemistry, New Mexico Institute of Mining and Technology, Socorro, New Mexico, who worked extensively in Antarctica over 28 field seasons, 1969–2000; completed six seasons under New Zealand Antarctic Research Program (NZARP) auspices, 1969–76 He was the principal investigator on numerous National Science Foundation research projects in 23 seasons of field work under United States Antarctic Program auspices, 1977–2000, with focus on long-term research of the volcano Mount Erebus, and was in charge of the Mount Erebus Volcano Observatory, 2000.

== Western features ==
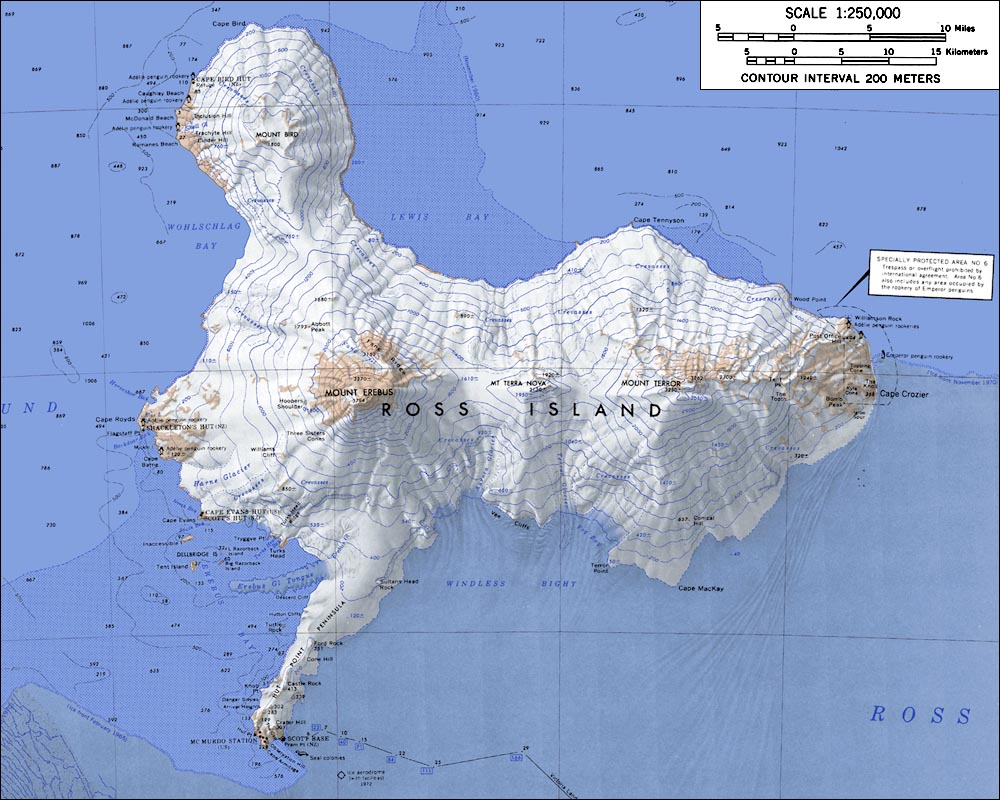
Ross Island. Kyle Hills to the east. Mount Terror is to the west and Cape Crozier to the east

Named features in the western part of the hills near Mount Terror include, from west to east,

=== Mount McIntosh ===
77.5166667°S 168.6833333°E. A mountain rising to about 2,600 metres (8,500 ft) high in the west part of Kyle Hills. It stands at the northwest end of Lofty Promenade, 1.5 nautical miles (2.8 km; 1.7 mi) east of the summit of Mount Terror. The mountain in conspicuous because of diagonal bands of rock and ice on the north face. At the suggestion of P.R. Kyle, named by Advisory Committee on Antarctic Names (US-ACAN) (2000) after William C. McIntosh, geologist, New Mexico Institute of Mines and Technology, who worked extensively in Antarctica under United States Antarctic Project (USAP) auspices and in support of Kyle's investigations on Mount Erebus; made first trip to Mount Erebus in 1977-78 and at least 15 trips through 1999.

=== Mount Melton ===
77.5166667°S 168.8666667°E, A squarish mountain 1.3 nautical miles (2.4 km; 1.5 mi) west of Tent Peak. The feature rises to about 2,000 metres (6,600 ft) high on the north side of Lofty Promenade. Named by Advisory Committee on Antarctic Names (US-ACAN) (2000) after Terry Melton, power plant mechanic/facilities engineer, Palmer Station, June 1981-Jan. 1983; worked nine WINFLY/summer seasons at McMurdo Sound as Williams Field facilities engineer/site supervisor, McMurdo operations superintendent, and McMurdo area manager, 1984–93; NSF McMurdo Station manager, Oct. 1998-Oct. 1999.

=== Lofty Promenade ===
77.5166667°S 168.8666667°E. An inclined glacial course, 7 nautical miles (13 km; 8.1 mi) long and 1 nautical mile (1.9 km; 1.2 mi) wide, in the east part of Ross Island. The feature is partly framed between the south elements of the Kyle Hills and Guardrail Ridge, as it descends east-southeast from 2,600 metres (8,500 ft) high near Mount Terror to 200 metres (660 ft) high near Allen Rocks. The glacial surface is relatively smooth and affords an unobstructed route between the Cape Crozier area and Mount Terror. The name is allusive and refers to a public place for taking a leisurely walk. Named by Advisory Committee on Antarctic Names (US-ACAN), 2000.

== Northeastern features ==
Named features in the northeastern part of the hills from Tekapo Ridge towards Post Office Hill include, from west to east,

=== Scanniello Peak ===
77.5166667°S 168.8166667°E. A peak which rises to 2,200 metres (7,200 ft) and marks the highest and southwest-most point of Tekapo Ridge. Named by the Advisory Committee on Antarctic Names (US-ACAN) (2000) after Jeffrey Scanniello, long-term ASA field engineer, who was active in surveying at McMurdo and South Pole Stations from 1990; member of McMurdo Station winter party, 1994.

=== Tekapo Ridge ===
77.5°S 168.8666667°E. A crescent-shaped chain of low peaks, 3 miles (4.8 km) long, in Kyle Hills. The ridge descends southwest-northeast from Scanniello Peak (about 2,200 metres (7,200 ft) high) to Parawera Cone (about 1,300 metres (4,300 ft) high). Named by the New Zealand Geographic Board (NZGB) (2000) after Tekapo, a New Zealand locality where Antarctic training takes place.

=== Parawera Cone ===
77.4833333°S 168.9833333°E. A cone rising to about 1,300 metres (4,300 ft) high at the northeast end of Tekapo Ridge. The cone is 1 nautical mile (1.9 km; 1.2 mi) northwest of Ainley Peak. The name Parawera (meaning south wind) is one of several Maori wind names applied by New Zealand Geographic Board (NZGB) in this area.

=== Dibble Peak ===
77.4833333°S 169.05°E. A peak 2.3 nautical miles (4.3 km; 2.6 mi) southwest of Post Office Hill. The peak rises to about 1,100 metres (3,600 ft) high and marks the highest and SW-most point of Warren Ridge. At the suggestion of P.R. Kyle, named by Advisory Committee on Antarctic Names (US-ACAN) (2000) after Raymond R. Dibble, geophysicist, Victoria University of Wellington, New Zealand, who visited Cape Crozier in the 1962-63 season; made seismic and volcanic observations of Mount Erebus during the 1970s, also 1980-86 as a founding member of the International Mount Erebus Seismic Studies (IMESS); after retirement from Victoria University and involvement with NZAP, Dibble joined United States Antarctic Project (USAP) and the NMIMT team (Kyle) in the maintenance and upgrading of the seismic stations run by the Mount Erebus Volcano Observatory, 1993–94, 1994–95, 1995–96, and 1997-98.

=== Warren Ridge ===
77°28′S 169°5′E. A southwest–northeast ridge 2 nautical miles (3.7 km; 2.3 mi) long on the north slope of Kyle Hills. The ridge rises to about 1,100 metres (3,600 ft) at the southwest end and culminates in Dibble Peak, 1 nautical mile (1.9 km; 1.2 mi) north of Ainley Peak. Named by Advisory Committee on Antarctic Names (US-ACAN) (2000) after Stephen G. Warren, Department of Atmospheric Sciences, University of Washington, Seattle, who worked several summer seasons with United States Antarctic Program (USAP) and ANARE (Australian National Antarctic Research Expeditions) from 1985, investigating climate processes on the Antarctic plateau in four deployments to South Pole Station, including the full year of 1992 as station science leader.

=== Ainley Peak ===
77.5°S 169.0333333°E. A prominent peak, 1,240 metres (4,070 ft) high, located 3 nautical miles (5.6 km; 3.5 mi) southwest of Post Office Hill. Named after David G. Ainley, Point Reyes Bird Observatory, Stinson Beach, CA, a United States Antarctic Project (USAP) ornithologist who studied penguin and skua populations at Cape Crozier and McMurdo Sound in six seasons, 1969-70 to 1983-84.

=== Tarakäkä Peak ===
77.5°S 169.15°E. A peak 1.3 nautical miles (2.4 km; 1.5 mi) east-northeast of Ainley Peak. The feature rises to about 700 metres (2,300 ft). The name Tarakäkä (meaning southwest wind) is one of several Maori wind names applied by New Zealand Geographic Board (NZGB) in this area.

=== Gamble Cone ===
77.4666667°S 169.2333333°E. A cone 0.6 nautical miles (1.1 km; 0.69 mi) south-southeast of Post Office Hill. The feature rises to about 400 metres (1,300 ft). A the suggestion of P.R. Kyle, named by Advisory Committee on Antarctic Names (US-ACAN) (2000) after John A. Gamble, geologist, Victoria University of Wellington, New Zealand, who participated in three United States Antarctic Project (USAP) field projects under Kyle's leadership, 1981–82, 1982–83, and 1984–85; later with NZAP on the West Antarctic Volcano Exploration, 1989–90, a collaborative US-UK-NZ effort in Marie Byrd Land; extensive work on Xenoliths that occur in volcanic rocks, including work at Cape Crozier and Cape Bird on Ross Island.

=== Post Office Hill ===
77°28′S 169°14′E. A prominent hill, 430 metres (1,410 ft) high, standing 4 nautical miles (7.4 km; 4.6 mi) northwest of The Knoll and overlooking the Adelie penguin rookery of Cape Crozier. Mapped and so named by the New Zealand Geological Survey Antarctic Expedition (NZGSAE), 1958–59, because the ship Discovery, in January 1902, left messages attached to a pole in a cairn of rocks in the rookery for the relief ship Morning.

=== Towle Point ===
77.45°S 169.2333333°E. A point 1 nautical mile (1.9 km; 1.2 mi) north of Post Office Hill that marks the northeast extremity of Ross Island. In association with the names of expeditionary ships grouped on this island, named after United States Naval Ship (USNS) Private John R. Towle, a ship that carried cargo to this area in support of United States Antarctic Project (USAP) in at least 18 seasons, 1956-80.

=== Topping Cone ===
77°29′S 169°16′E. An exposed volcanic cone near Cape Crozier, located 1.75 nautical miles (3.24 km; 2.01 mi) northwest of the summit of The Knoll. Named by the New Zealand Antarctic Place-Names Committee (NZ-APC) for W.W. Topping, geologist with VUWAE which examined the cone in the 1969-70 season.

== Southeastern features ==
Named features in the southeastern part of the hills from Guardrail Ridge towards The Knoll include, from west to east,

=== Sherve Peak ===
77.5166667°S 168.7666667°E. A peak rising to 2,200 metres (7,200 ft) high in the west part of Guardrail Ridge. Named by Advisory Committee on Antarctic Names (US-ACAN) (2000) after John Sherve, facilities maintenance supervisor/construction coordinator at McMurdo Station, 1988–94; ASA resident manager at McMurdo Station, winter 1994; NSF McMurdo Station manager, Dec. 1997-Nov. 1998.

=== Guardrail Ridge ===
77.5333333°S 168.8333333°E. A ridge 2 nautical miles (3.7 km; 2.3 mi) long located 2 nautical miles (3.7 km; 2.3 mi) west-southwest of The Tooth. The ridge rises to 2,200 metres (7,200 ft) at Sherve Peak. The name alludes to the position of the ridge along the south margin of Lofty Promenade. Named by Advisory Committee on Antarctic Names (US-ACAN), 2000.

=== Coughran Peak ===
77.5333333°S 168.8833333°E. A peak rising to about 1,700 metres (5,600 ft) high at the east end of Guardrail Ridge. Named by Advisory Committee on Antarctic Names (US-ACAN) (2000) after William A. Coughran, long-term United States Antarctic Project (USAP) support employee who made 14 deployments to South Pole and McMurdo Stations, including three winter-over assignments, from 1984; ITT/ANS South Pole Station manager, winter 1989; NSF McMurdo Station manager, winter 2000.

=== Lutz Hill ===
77.5333333°S 169.0333333°E. A hill rising to about 1,000 metres (3,300 ft) high 1 nautical mile (1.9 km; 1.2 mi) southeast of The Tooth. Named by Advisory Committee on Antarctic Names (US-ACAN) (2000) after Larry F. Lutz, electrical engineer, Institute for Physical Science and Technology, University of Maryland, a specialist in the development of scientific research instrumentation for ground based, balloon, and rocket sounding programs for United States Antarctic Project (USAP); 17 summer seasons at McMurdo, South Pole, and Siple Stations, 1980-2000.

=== Panter Ridge ===
77.55°S 169.05°E. A solitary ridge 0.5 nautical miles (0.93 km; 0.58 mi) long that rises to 800 metres (2,600 ft) high between Slattery Peak and Detrick Peak. At the suggestion of P.R. Kyle, named by Advisory Committee on Antarctic Names (US-ACAN) (2000) after Kurt S. Panter, who, as a Ph.D. student at New Mexico Institute of Mining and Technology, worked extensively in Marie Byrd Land where he completed his dissertation on rocks from Mount Sidley; also assisted with work on Mount Erebus in five field seasons, 1988-96.

=== Terrie Bluff ===
77.5266667°S 169.0875°E. A rock bluff rising to 1,000 metres (3,300 ft) high 1.5 nautical miles (2.8 km; 1.7 mi) south-southeast of Ainley Peak. The steep rock bluff face marks the east end of a mound-shaped and mostly ice-covered elevation 0.5 nautical miles (0.93 km; 0.58 mi) northwest of Detrick Peak. Named by Advisory Committee on Antarctic Names (US-ACAN) (2005) after Terrie/Theresa M. Williams Professor of Ecology and Evolutionary Biology, University of California, Santa Cruz; United States Antarctic Project (USAP) co-principal investigator of hunting behavior of free-ranging Weddell seals, several seasons in McMurdo Sound sea ice areas, 1984-2002

=== Detrick Peak ===
77.5333333°S 169.1°E. A sharp peak, about 700 metres (2,300 ft) high standing 1 nautical mile (1.9 km; 1.2 mi) east-southeast of Lutz Hill. Named by Advisory Committee on Antarctic Names (US-ACAN) (2000) after Daniel L. Detrick, physicist/engineer, Institute for Physical Science and Technology, University of Maryland, involved in long-term ionospheric research with United States Antarctic Project (USAP), including the design and fabrication, as well as deployment of instruments at McMurdo, South Pole, and Siple Stations; more than a dozen visits to Antarctica from 1980.

=== Allen Rocks ===
77.55°S 169.15°E. A small but distinctive group of rocks 2.2 nautical miles (4.1 km; 2.5 mi) east-northeast of Slattery Peak. The feature includes a central nunatak that in outline resembles the letter a. A low ridge encloses the nunatak except on the south. Named by Advisory Committee on Antarctic Names (US-ACAN) (2000) after Robert J. Allen, United States Antarctic Resource Center, United States Geological Survey (USGS), Reston, VA, cartographer and expert on aerial photography of Antarctica, who was closely involved in United States Geological Survey (USGS) mapping of the continent, 1950-2000.

=== Bomb Peak ===
77°32′S 169°15′E. A peak, 805 metres (2,641 ft) high, situated 2 nautical miles (3.7 km; 2.3 mi) west of Cape Crozier. Charted and so named by the NZGSAE, 1958–59, because of the bomb-like (pyroplastic) geological formations surrounding the summit of this peak.

=== Kyle Cone ===
77°31′S 169°16′E. An exposed volcanic cone near Cape Crozier, located 1.2 nautical miles (2.2 km; 1.4 mi) west-northwest of the summit of The Knoll. Named by NZ-APC after Philip R. Kyle (see Kyle Peak), a geologist with VUWAE, which examined the cone in the 1969-70 season.

=== The Knoll ===
77°31′S 169°21′E. A snow-free knoll, 370 metres (1,210 ft) high, surmounting Cape Crozier. Discovered and named by the British National Antarctic Expedition (BrNAE), 1901–04, under Scott.

== Sources ==
- "Ainley Peak", Geographic Names Information System, United States Geological Survey, United States Department of the Interior
- Alberts, Fred G., ed. (1995), Geographic Names of the Antarctic (PDF) (2 ed.), United States Board on Geographic Names This article incorporates public domain material from websites or documents of the United States Board on Geographic Names.
- "Allen Rocks", Geographic Names Information System, United States Geological Survey, United States Department of the Interior
- "Coughran Peak", Geographic Names Information System, United States Geological Survey, United States Department of the Interior
- "Detrick Peak", Geographic Names Information System, United States Geological Survey, United States Department of the Interior
- "Dibble Peak", Geographic Names Information System, United States Geological Survey, United States Department of the Interior
- "Gamble Cone", Geographic Names Information System, United States Geological Survey, United States Department of the Interior
- "Guardrail Ridge", Geographic Names Information System, United States Geological Survey, United States Department of the Interior
- "Kyle Hills", Geographic Names Information System, United States Geological Survey, United States Department of the Interior
- "Lofty Promenade", Geographic Names Information System, United States Geological Survey, United States Department of the Interior
- "Lutz Hill", Geographic Names Information System, United States Geological Survey, United States Department of the Interior
- "Mount McIntosh", Geographic Names Information System, United States Geological Survey, United States Department of the Interior
- "Mount Melton", Geographic Names Information System, United States Geological Survey, United States Department of the Interior
- "Panter Ridge", Geographic Names Information System, United States Geological Survey, United States Department of the Interior
- "Parawera Cone", Geographic Names Information System, United States Geological Survey, United States Department of the Interior
- "Scanniello Peak", Geographic Names Information System, United States Geological Survey, United States Department of the Interior
- "Sherve Peak", Geographic Names Information System, United States Geological Survey, United States Department of the Interior
- "Tarakäkä Peak", Geographic Names Information System, United States Geological Survey, United States Department of the Interior
- "Tekapo Ridge", Geographic Names Information System, United States Geological Survey, United States Department of the Interior
- "Terrie Bluff", Geographic Names Information System, United States Geological Survey, United States Department of the Interior
- "Towle Point", Geographic Names Information System, United States Geological Survey, United States Department of the Interior

This article incorporates public domain material from websites or documents of the United States Geological Survey.
