= Conservation Biology (journal) =

Peer-reviewed scientific journal

- Discipline: Conservation biology
- Language: English
- Edited by: Mark Burgman

Publication details
- History: 1987–present
- Publisher: Wiley-Blackwell on behalf of the Society for Conservation Biology
- Frequency: Bimonthly
- Impact factor: 5.405 (2019)

Standard abbreviations
- ISO 4: Conserv. Biol.

Indexing
- CODEN: CBIOEF
- ISSN: 0888-8892 (print); 1523-1739 (web)
- LCCN: 88659972
- OCLC no.: 715539913

Links
- Journal homepage; Journal page at publisher's website; Online access; Online archive

Conservation Biology is a bimonthly peer-reviewed scientific journal of the Society for Conservation Biology, published by Wiley-Blackwell and established in May 1987. It covers the science and practice of conserving Earth's biological diversity, including issues concerning any of the Earth's ecosystems or regions. The editor-in-chief is Mark Burgman.

== Scope ==
The scientific papers in the journal cover a variety of topics, such as population ecology and genetics, climate change, freshwater and marine conservation, ecosystem management, citizen science, and other human dimensions of conservation, but all topics focus primarily on conservation relevance rather than specific ecosystems, species, or situations. Subscription to the journal is only open to members of Society for Conservation Biology.

== Journal Metrics ==
According to the Journal Citation Reports, the journal has a 2019 impact factor of 5.405. It ranks 3rd among 55 in journals that focus on biodiversity and conservation, 12th among 158 in journals with an ecological focus. Conservation Biology also has an h5 index of 59, a cited half-life of >10, and a CiteScore of 5.97.
