= Network of Conservation Educators and Practitioners =

The Network of Conservation Educators and Practitioners (NCEP) is a project developed by the Center for Biodiversity and Conservation (CBC) of the American Museum of Natural History (AMNH) and its partners around the world. NCEP is a global initiative, currently active in Bolivia, Laos, Madagascar, Mexico, Myanmar, Peru, Rwanda, the United States, the Solomon Islands, and Vietnam.

== Goals ==
The project's stated goals are to:

- Develop and disseminate open educational resources on managing and sustaining biological and cultural diversity;
- Foster an active approach to teaching and learning that models the realities of professional practice; and
- Create global opportunities for communication and interaction among conservation educators and practitioners.

== Teaching modules ==
One of the project’s tangible products is a series of multi-component open educational resources, or modules, for teachers.

Each module includes a Synthesis document that brings together key concepts, applications, and literature for a topic, as well as an easily modified visual Presentation, and a practical Exercise for laboratory or field use. Exercise solutions and teaching notes are also provided for the instructor, as are learning goals and student assessment questions. In addition, interdisciplinary Case Studies integrate key concepts and questions that span the topics of more than one module. The modules are flexible and adaptable resources for professors and trainers in the field of biodiversity conservation and are tailored to the context where they will be used in terms of language and examples. They model the richly interconnected, interdisciplinary, and rapidly evolving nature of the field of conservation biology, and focus on developing the skills needed to decide when, how, and why a tool is the best choice for a particular conservation application. At present, more than 100 complete or partial modules are available for use and testing in several languages (English, Spanish, French, and Lao), and this number is expected to continue to grow. Modules are distributed free of cost to the users, and are available in printed form, on CD-ROM, and in electronic form via the Internet (http://ncep.amnh.org).

== Workshops ==
Individual educators at any location with Internet access may participate by simply downloading and using NCEP materials free of charge. However, in several countries, the CBC and its local partners are following a more intensive implementation strategy, with workshops and training events that bring educators and conservation practitioners together for a variety of purposes. In some cases, workshops are held to review and adapt existing modules to the context of a particular country. In other cases, workshops facilitate the production of new modules, or present new modules for discussion and evaluation by faculty peers. Finally, some workshops are focused on how modules can be used, and in particular, on how the principles of active teaching and learning embedded in NCEP module structure and content can be effectively used in the classroom to improve how conservation biology is taught. Since 2001, the CBC and its partners have held more than 70 NCEP workshops and training events in fifteen countries, reaching a total of more than 1500 faculty members, practitioners, and students.

| Year | Location of workshops |
|---|---|
| 2001 | Cochabamba, Bolivia; La Paz, Bolivia; Santa Cruz, Bolivia |
| 2002 | Cochabamba, Bolivia; Hanoi, Vietnam; Society for Conservation Biology (SCB) annual meeting, University of Kent at Canterbury, United Kingdom |
| 2003 | Santa Cruz, Bolivia; Antananarivo, Madagascar; Veracruz, Mexico; Laos PDR; SCB annual meeting, University of Minnesota, Duluth, Minnesota, USA |
| 2004 | Santa Cruz, Bolivia; La Paz, Bolivia; Mantasoa, Madagascar; Antananarivo, Madagascar; Veracruz, Mexico; Yangon, Myanmar; SCB annual meeting, Columbia University, New York, New York, USA |
| 2005 | La Paz, Bolivia; Laos PDR; Antananarivo, Madagascar; Kirindy, Madagascar; Fianarantsoa, Madagascar; Xalapa, Mexico; Kuala Lumpur, Malaysia; Monterey, California, USA; Portal, Arizona, USA; SCB annual meeting, Universidade de Brasília, Brasília, Brazil |
| 2006 | Tulear, Madagascar; Antananarivo, Madagascar; Lima, Peru; Butare, Rwanda; La Paz, Bolivia; Ankarafantsika, Madagascar; Ampefy, Madagascar; Fort Dauphin, Madagascar; SCB annual meeting, McEnery Convention Center in San Jose, California, USA |
| 2007 | Antananarivo, Madagascar; Black Rock Forest, New York, USA; Vientiane, Lao PDR; Butare, Rwanda; Toaliara, Madagascar; Manahoro, Madagascar; Champasak, Lao PDR; American Museum of Natural History, New York, New York, USA; Ivoloina, Madagascar; Sava, Madagascar; Pachacamac, Peru; SCB annual meeting, Nelson Mandela Metropolitan University, Port Elizabeth, South Africa |
| 2008 | Butare, Rwanda; San Jose, California; SCB annual meeting, The University of Tennessee, Chattanooga, Tennessee, USA |

== Lessons in Conservation ==
In 2007, NCEP began publishing the freely available online journal, Lessons in Conservation (LinC; http://ncep.amnh.org/linc). The journal is published electronically (downloaded as a PDF) and is released periodically; it features selected NCEP educational materials. Currently, only one issue has been released with materials from the NCEP modules: Introduction to Marine Conservation Biology, Assessing Threats to Conservation Planning and Management, Ecosystem Loss and Fragmentation, and Biodiversity Conservation and Integrated Conservation and Development Projects (ICDPs). The journal is co-edited by Eleanor Sterling and Nora Bynum.
