= Conservation Letters =

- Discipline: Conservation biology
- Language: English
- Edited by: Edward T. Game

Publication details
- History: 2008–present
- Publisher: Wiley-Blackwell on behalf of the Society for Conservation Biology
- Frequency: Bimonthly
- Open access: Yes
- License: Creative Commons Attribution
- Impact factor: 8.105 (2020)

Standard abbreviations
- ISO 4: Conserv. Lett.

Indexing
- ISSN: 1755-263X
- LCCN: 2010250645
- OCLC no.: 754946838

Links
- Journal homepage; Online access; Online archive

Conservation Letters is a bimonthly peer-reviewed open access scientific journal of the Society for Conservation Biology published by Wiley-Blackwell. It was established in 2008 and covers research on all aspects of conservation biology. The editor-in-chief is Graeme Cumming.

== Abstracting and indexing ==
The journal is abstracted and indexed in:

- Biological Abstracts
- BIOSIS Previews
- CAB Abstracts
- Current Contents/Agriculture, Biology & Environmental Sciences
- EBSCO databases
- Science Citation Index Expanded
- Scopus
- Veterinary Science Database
- The Zoological Record

According to the Journal Citation Reports, the journal has a 2020 impact factor of 8.105.
