= Society for Conservation Biology =

Environmental organization

- Founded: May 8, 1985
- Type: Scientific society
- Tax ID no.: 33-0147824 (U.S.A.)
- Purpose: Conservation biology, education, policy
- Location: Washington, D.C., United States
- Members: >4,000
- Revenue: US$2,791,907 (2016)
- Employees: 16
- Volunteers: ~100
- Website: conbio.org

The Society for Conservation Biology (SCB) is an 501(c)(3) non-profit international professional organization that is dedicated to conserving biodiversity. There are more than 4,000 members worldwide, including students and individuals in related non-academic sectors. There are 36 chapters throughout the world.

The society was founded in 1985 and launched the peer reviewed journal Conservation Biology in 1987, published by Wiley-Blackwell. This has been supplemented since 2007 by the rapid publication journal Conservation Letters.

== History ==
The origin of the society resulted from the emergence of the field as a distinct subject in the 1970s. The phrase conservation biology originated from a conference of ecologists and population biologists at the University of Michigan. The book that emerged from the conference, "Conservation Biology": An Evolutionary-Ecological Perspective, proved highly influential internationally, eventually selling tens of thousands of copies including a Russian translation. Michael E. Soulé was the SCB's co-founder and first president.

By the mid-1980s there was sufficient interest and participation to establish a formal society and publish a peer reviewed journal, Conservation Biology, started in May 1987 and published by Blackwell Scientific Publishers. In 2000 the society launched Conservation magazine, which was designed to complement Conservation Biology by making current conservation biology tools, techniques, and case studies accessible to practitioners, policy makers, and others. In 2014, Conservation magazine was renamed Anthropocene magazine and it is now published by University of Washington. In 2007, SCB started their second publication, Conservation Letters, an online rapid publication journal that covers cutting-edge, policy-relevant conservation research from both natural and social sciences.

== International Congress for Conservation Biology ==
Since 1998, SCB has hosted the International Congress for Conservation Biology. This congress is designed as a forum for addressing global conservation challenges. The congress was held annually until 2011, when it was changed to a biennial schedule to reduce carbon impacts of travel to global congresses. The location of the congress rotates worldwide through all sections.

== Sections ==
In 2000 the SCB Board of Governors approved the creation of seven regional sections that were formed over the following two years. The seven sections are Africa, Asia, Europe, Latin America & Caribbean, North America, Marine and Oceania. These sections were established to help implement the society’s mission and goals on a regional scale. Each section holds its own congress, often in alternating years with international congress. Each section also has its own international Board of Directors.

=== Africa Section ===
The SCB Africa Section is dedicated to advancing the discipline of conservation biology in Africa and to helping African conservation scientists find lasting solutions to conservation problems in Africa. It was established at a meeting in Nairobi, Kenya in 2001 where conservation scientists and practitioners met to discuss conservation issues in Africa. SCB Africa Section has multiple groups and committees, including a Social Science and Gender Committee, Conservation, Policy, Education and Science Committee, Young Women Conservation Biologists' Group, and Communications and Mentoring Program. SCB Africa has organized the African Congress for Conservation Biology since 2007. This congress brings conservation professionals together to promote and reflect on conservation biology in Africa.

=== Asia Section ===
The SCB Asia Section strives to bring together experts from across the world to address biodiversity science and policy across Asia. It was established at the annual SCB meeting in Duluth, Minnesota, in 2003. SCB Asia has organized the SCB Asia Section Meeting since 2015 to bring together conservation professionals in Asia and promote biodiversity conservation across Asia.

=== Europe Section ===
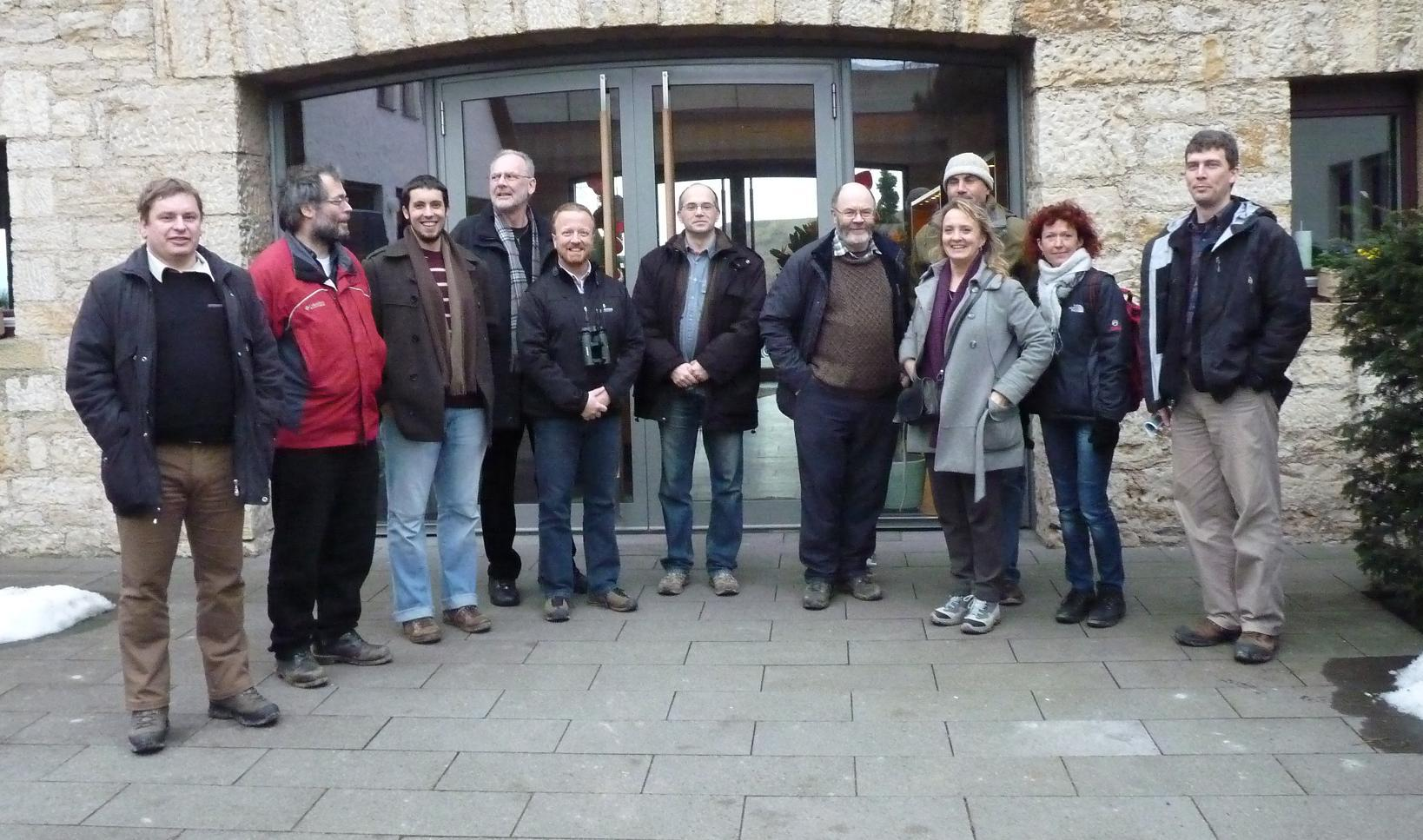
Section meeting at Freiburg, 2010

The SCB Europe Section is dedicated to promoting conservation biology and to applying it to conserve biodiversity in Europe and the EU. It was established at the annual SCB meeting in Canterbury 2002. SCB Europe Section has task-oriented committees including Policy, Education, Communication, and Membership. SCB Europe has organised the European Congress of Conservation Biology since 2006, with the 2022 edition being organised at the Czech University of Life Sciences Prague. This facilitates the exchange on conservation science and nature conservation practice and policy, with the aim of promoting the protection of biological diversity in Europe.

=== Latin America & Caribbean Section ===
The SCB Latin America & Caribbean Section, formally called the Austral and Neotropical American Section, was formed in 2003 to unite conservation efforts in Central and South America. The SCB Latin America & Caribbean Section organizes the Latin America and Caribbean Congress for Conservation Biology, which aims to connect conservation efforts between the Caribbean and Latin America.

=== Marine Section ===
The SCB Marine Section, formed in 2001, is dedicated to advancing the science and practice of conserving the Earth's marine biological diversity. It does not have a specific regional focus but rather focuses on furthering all marine conservation science, public policy, and research as it regards marine issues as global. It has multiple committees, including a Marine Policy Committee, Diversity Committee, and Marine Education Committee. The SCB Marine Section has organized the International Marine Conservation Congress since 2011 to bring together marine scientists and marine conservation professionals to further marine conservation science and policy.

=== North America Section ===
The SCB North America Section represents the North American continent north of Mexico (Mexico is part of the SCB Latin America & Caribbean Section) and is dedicated to bridging the gap between research and practice in order to help its members be more effective in facilitating on-the-ground conservation success. The SCB North America Section has had the North American Congress for Conservation Biology since 2009. Each meeting has had a different theme relating to conservation in North America, including "Conservation Science, Policy, and Practice: Connecting the Urban to the Wild" and "Bridging the Gap: Connecting People, Nature & Climate".

=== Oceania Section ===
The SCB Oceania Section, including Australia, New Zealand and Pacific Island regions, was established in 2005. The mission of the SCB Oceania Section is to promote conservation science and practice in local communities and bring together conservation professionals in the region. Since 2007 it has held the Oceania Congress for Conservation Biology, which focuses on bringing together conservation professionals to present new findings, methods, tools, and opportunities in conservation science and practice.

== Chapters ==
SCB chapters are local groupings that are associated with regional sections, and are a means to work locally to achieve conservation success. The following chapters are listed within each of the seven sections:

- Africa: Cameroon Chapter, Ghana Chapter, Madagascar Chapter, Nigeria Chapter, South Africa Chapter
- Asia: Bangladesh Chapter, Indonesia Chapter, Iran Chapter, Israeli Chapter, India Chapter, Malaysia Chapter, Korean Chapter
- Europe: Hungarian Chapter, Italy Chapter, Nordic Chapter
- Latin America & Caribbean: Southern Cone of South America Chapter
- North America: Kingston Chapter, Toronto Chapter, Berkeley Chapter, Central Arizona Chapter, Colorado State University Chapter, Davis Chapter, Hawaii Chapter, Lake Superior State University Chapter, Orange County Chapter, Santa Cruz Chapter, Washington DC Chapter, Student Chapter of Wisconsin, Tampa Chapter, Texas A&M Student Chapter, Wisconsin Chapter, West Virginia University Chapter
- Oceania: Sydney Chapter, University of Queensland/Brisbane Chapter, Papua New Guinea Chapter, Victoria University of Wellington Chapter

== Working Groups ==
In 2001, SCB began to develop topical working groups that would focus on areas relevant to the mission and goals of SCB and to create a way to promote important conservation issues that are not currently addressed in SCB's activities. The first working groups were officially formed in 2003. Today SCB has seven official working groups, which are:

- Freshwater Working Group: The Freshwater Working Group was established in 2003 to promote effective freshwater ecosystem conservation and science across the globe.
- Social Science Working Group: The Social Science Working Group was established in 2003 to strengthen conservation social science and its application to conservation around the globe.
- Religion and Conservation Biology Working Group: The Religion and Conservation Biology Working Group was established in 2007 to strengthen collaboration between conservation and faith traditions and to promote awareness of this collaboration within the conservation community.
- Conservation Marketing Working Group: The Conservation Marketing and Engagement Working Group was established in 2014 to promote awareness, acceptance, and use of marketing techniques within SCB and conservation science. In 2018, they will host the 1st Annual International Conservation Marketing and Engagement Congress.
- Conservation Genetics Working Groups: The Conservation Genetics Working Group was established in 2016 to help integrate genetics with the practice of biodiversity conservation and improve how genetic studies are communicated to the broader conservation audience.
- Participatory and Citizen Science Working Group: The Participatory and Citizen Science Working Group was established in 2016 to facilitate citizen science research and promote citizen science as an effective method in advancing biodiversity conservation.
- Conservation Technology: The Conservation Technology Working Group was established in 2016 to promote and facilitate discussion, collaboration, and use of different and new technologies that can be used in conservation.
