= Isha Foundation =

Spiritual organisation founded by Jaggi Vasudev

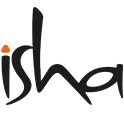
- Founded: 1992; 34 years ago
- Founder: Sadhguru
- Type: Nonprofit organization
- Purpose: Yoga, social upliftment, ecological conservation
- Location: Coimbatore, Tamil Nadu, India
- Region served: India, Lebanon, United States, United Kingdom, Australia, Malaysia, Singapore
- Method: Yoga programs, meditation, tree planting, rural upliftment
- Revenue: $40m (US chapter) (2022)
- Website: isha.sadhguru.org

The Isha Foundation is a nonprofit, spiritual organisation that was founded in 1992 near Coimbatore, Tamil Nadu, India, by Sadhguru (Jagadish Vasudev). It hosts the Isha Yoga Centre, which offers yoga programs under the name Isha Yoga. The foundation is run "almost entirely" by volunteers. According to Sadhguru, the word isha means "the formless divine".

== Isha Yoga ==
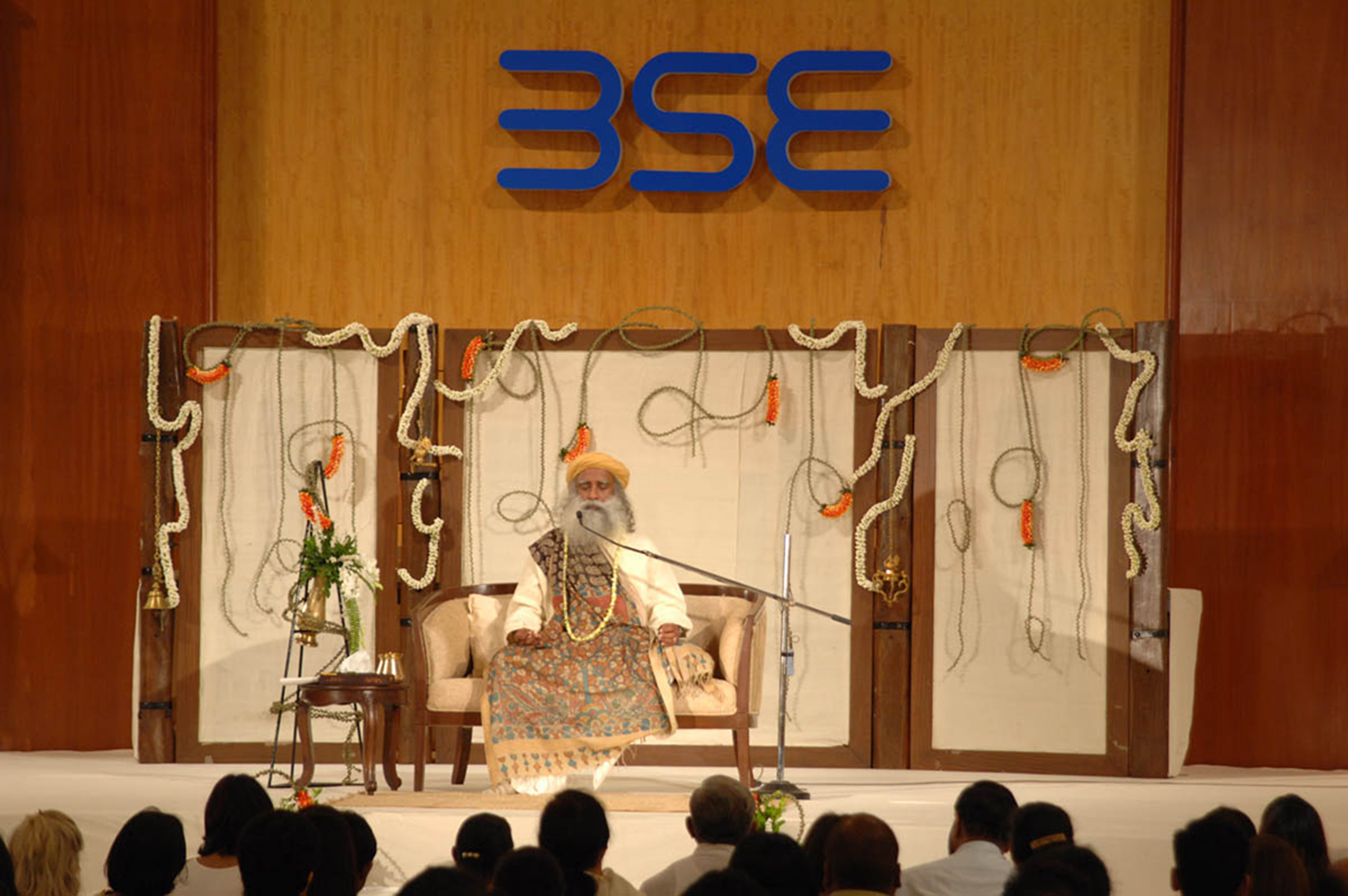
Vasudev conducting an "Inner Engineering" class at BSE, Mumbai

The Yoga Centre at the Isha Foundation was founded in 1994, and offers yoga programmes under the name Isha Yoga. This customised system of yoga combines postural yoga with chanting, breathing (prāṇāyāma) and meditation. It does not belong to a lineage (paramparā), and its practitioners believe it to be based on the founding guru's unique insight.

Yoga classes for business leaders are intended to "introduce a sense of compassion and inclusiveness" to economics.

A yoga course for the Indian national hockey team was conducted in 1996. Isha Foundation began conducting yoga programs in the United States in 1997 and, in 1998, yoga classes for life-term prisoners in Tamil Nadu prisons.

== Activities ==
The foundation organises gatherings (sathsangs) with Vasudev in the Indian states of Tamil Nadu and Karnataka, where he delivers discourses, leads meditations, and conducts question-answer sessions. It organises annual pilgrimages (yatras) to Mount Kailash and the Himalayas under Isha Sacred Walks. The Kailash-Manasarovar pilgrimage led by Vasudev is among the largest groups to visit Kailash, with 514 pilgrims making the journey in 2010. The trip cost up to Rs ₹5 million (US$52,000) per person in 2021, with cheaper options available in which devotees receive limited interaction with Vasudev. In 2026, 80 pilgrims were killed by the 2026 Nepal–Tibet floods whilst waiting at the border crossing.

The centre hosts an annual seven-day-long music and dance festival culminating in the all-night celebration of Maha Shivaratri, a major Hindu festival honouring Shiva. They also have courses such as Sadhguru's Inner Engineering.

The foundation sells various products such as yoga mats, personal care products and accessories. Its US chapter reported revenue of $40 million in 2022. The "business leadership" insights program, in particular, was priced at $6500 per person.

== Social and environmental initiatives ==
=== Project GreenHands ===
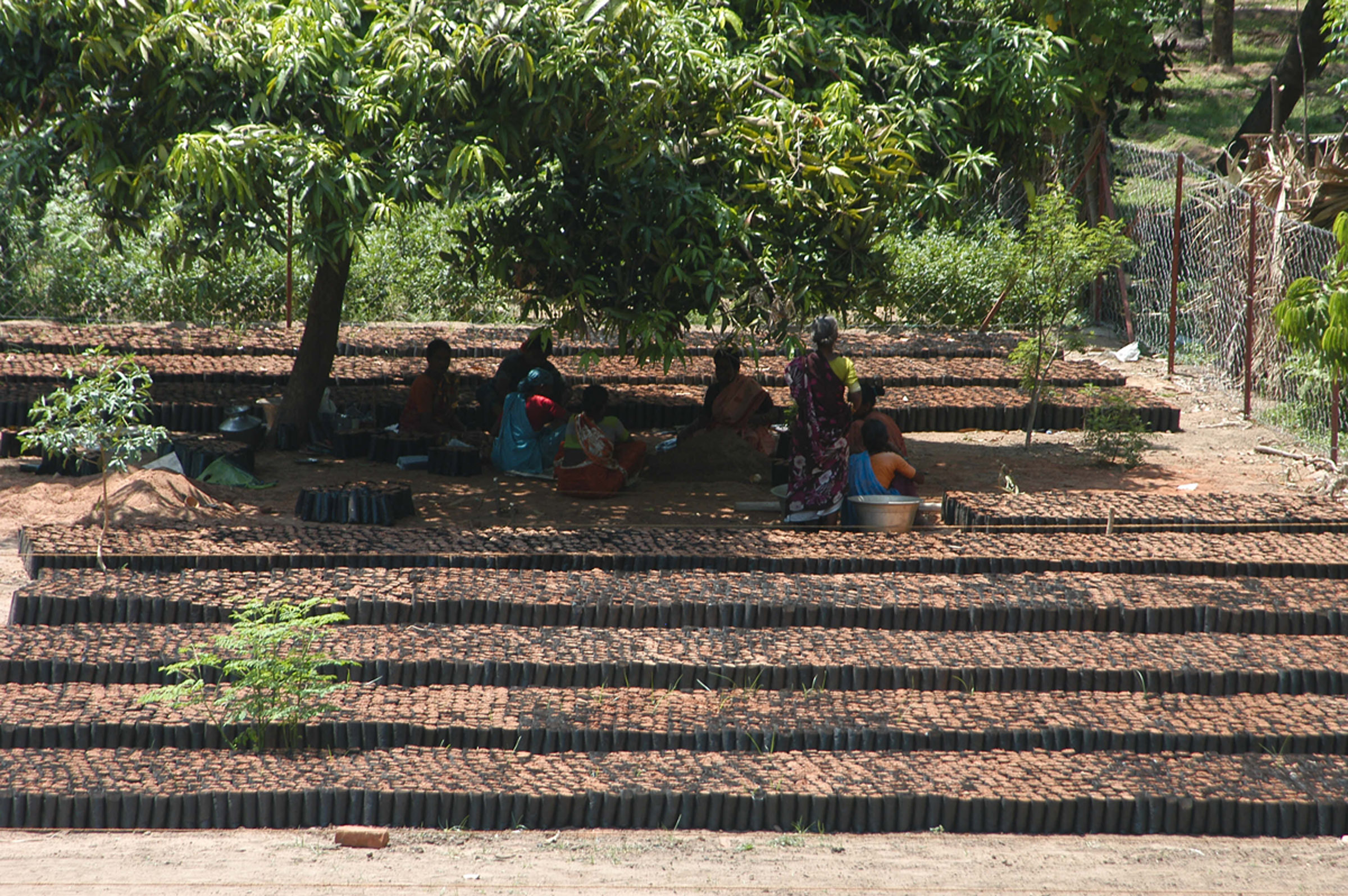
Saplings being readied for transportation at a PGH nursery

Project GreenHands (PGH) was established in 2004 as an environmental organisation. It largely focuses on Tamil Nadu. It received the Indira Gandhi Paryavaran Puraskar, the Government of India's environmental award, in 2010. Its activities include agroforestry, plant nurseries in schools, and tree-planting in urban centres such as Tiruchirappalli and Tiruppur.

=== Action for Rural Rejuvenation ===
Action for Rural Rejuvenation is a health and community-oriented program focusing on rural Tamil Nadu. It was established in 2003, and as of 2010 operated in 4,200 villages with a population of seven million.

Action for Rural Rejuvenation hosts the annual Gramotsavam sports festival in Tamil Nadu, promoting sports as a part of daily life in rural communities to improve mental and physical well-being. In recognition of this effort, Isha received India's National Sports Promotion Award in the Sport for Development category in 2018.

=== Isha Vidhya ===
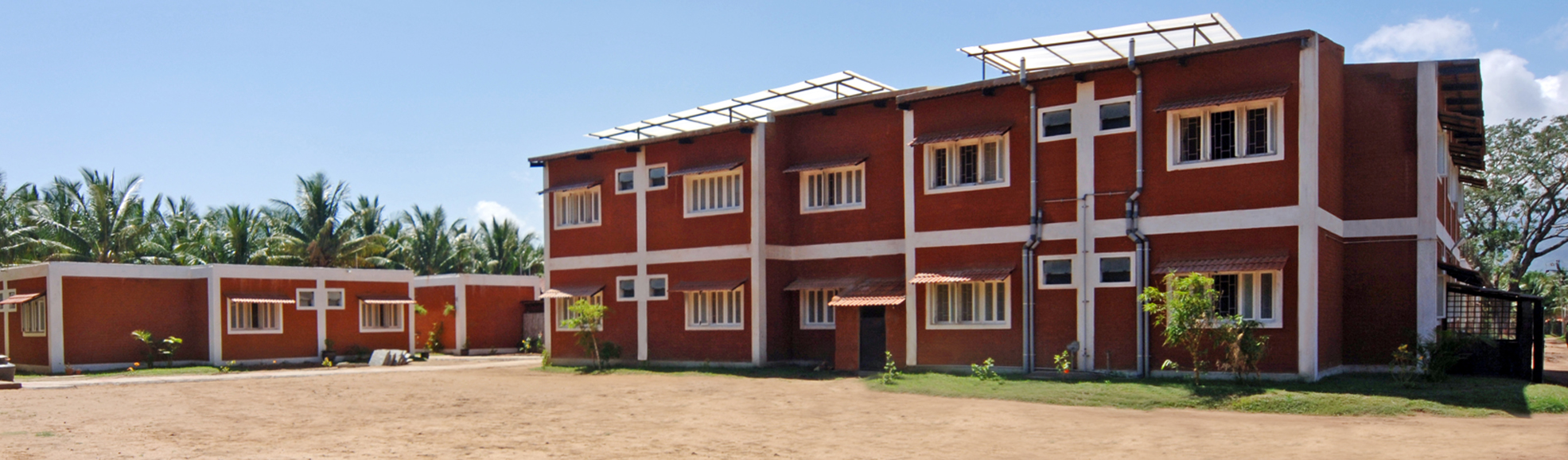
Isha Home School premises.

Isha Vidhya, an education initiative, aims to raise education and literacy in rural India by providing English-language-based, computer-aided education for children. There are seven Isha Vidhya Schools, with around 3,000 students. In 2010, the Life Insurance Corporation of India Golden Jubilee Foundation provided a grant for construction at an Isha Vidhya School in Coimbatore. In 2022, the initiative onboarded Byju's to provide digital learning tools to underprivileged children in Tamil Nadu and Andhra Pradesh.

=== Rally for Rivers ===
Rally for Rivers was a month-long, nationwide campaign Isha Foundation launched in 2017 to address the scarcity of water across rivers in India and instill awareness about protecting rivers. Vasudev launched the campaign on 3 September from Isha Yoga Centre, Coimbatore. On 3 October, he presented a river revitalisation draft proposal to Prime Minister of India Narendra Modi. The states of Karnataka, Assam, Chhattisgarh, Punjab, Maharashtra and Gujarat signed memorandums of understanding with Isha Foundation to plant trees along river banks. The Niti Aayog and the Ministry of Water Resources formed committees to study the draft policy proposal. Under the name Rally for Rivers, a Cauvery calling campaign was organised, which lasted over a decade. The project mainly focuses on river Kaveri. In November, at a conference in Germany, United Nations Environment Programme executive director Erik Solheim discussed Rally for Rivers with Vasudev, and how environmental programs around the world could emulate its success.

Rally for Rivers has been criticised by environmentalists who allege that it was trying to solve a complex problem with a "shallow solution".

=== Cauvery Calling ===
The Cauvery Calling project aims to support farmers in planting an estimated 2.4 billion trees through agroforestry, thereby covering one third of Cauvery basin with trees as a means of conserving it. The project has received acclaim from politicians and members of the movie industry, but environmentalists and public intellectuals have alleged that it presents a simplistic view of river conservation, sidestepping social issues and ignoring potential harm to tributaries and wildlife habitats. A public interest litigation has also been filed in the Karnataka High Court questioning the legality of the initiative's fundraising practices and the use of government-owned land for a private purpose without supporting study. In January 2020, the High Court ruled that the foundation must disclose details of the initiative's fundraising practices.

=== Save Soil ===
The Save Soil movement is an international effort to raise awareness about soil health. As part of the campaign, Vasudev completed a 100-day, 30,000 km journey from London to southern India to meet with government officials, international organizations, and interested members of the public. The United Nations Convention to Combat Desertification and the World Food Programme have partnered with the organization to address soil degradation and associated effects. Countries such as Barbados and states in India, such as Rajasthan and Gujarat, have signed a memorandum of understanding with Save Soil. In conjunction with these efforts, the foundation has hosted walkathons for Save Soil in cities across North America.

Critics have said the initiative lacks sufficient engagement with public and private institutions.

=== Isha Outreach ===
In 2025, Isha Outreach signed an agreement with the government of Bihar to develop and operate crematorium facilities there. By 2026, facilities were operating at Patna, Begusarai, Bhagalpur, Gaya and Saharsa, with one under construction at Chapra.

== Ashram ==
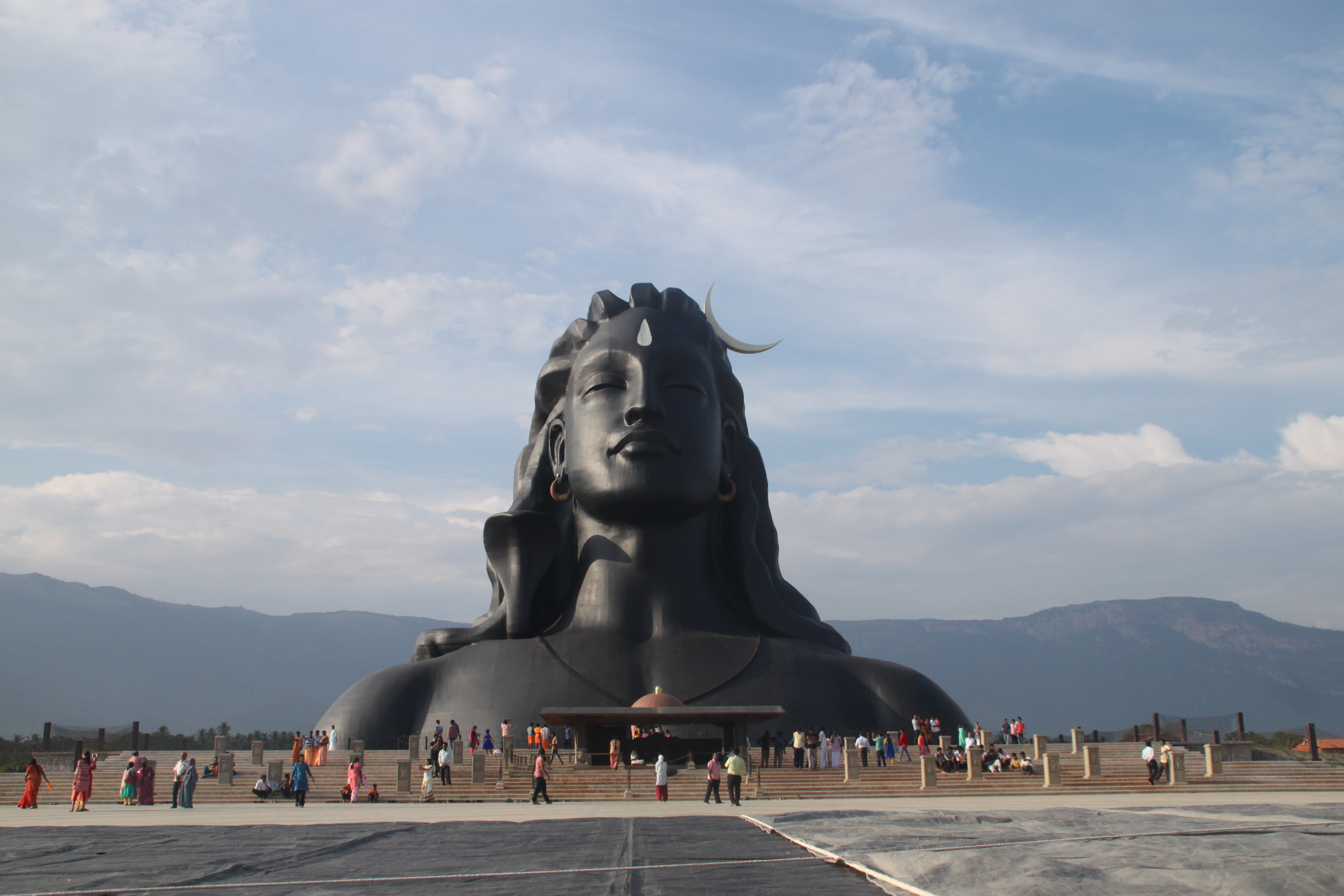
Adiyogi Shiva statue at Isha Foundation's ashram near Coimbatore, Tamil Nadu, India.

Isha Foundation's headquarters are in an ashram on the foothills of the Velliangiri Mountains, adjacent to the Nilgiri Biosphere Reserve, about 40 kilometres from Coimbatore, Tamil Nadu. The foundation's construction activities at Isha Yoga Centre in Coimbatore have been alleged to have violated rules and regulations on several occasions. Environmental activists and the local indigenous community have fought the ashram's expansion.

=== Adiyogi Shiva statue ===
Vasudev designed the Isha Yoga Centre's 112-foot Adiyogi Shiva statue. It was inaugurated on Mahashivaratri, 24 February 2017, by Prime Minister Modi. The statue depicts Shiva as the first yogi or Adiyogi, and the first Guru or Adi Guru, who offered yoga to humanity. The Isha Foundation built it using 20,000 individual iron plates supplied by the Steel Authority of India, and it weighs around 500 tonnes (490 long tons; 550 short tons). Guinness World Records has recognised it as the "Largest Bust Sculpture". A consecrated Shivalinga, Yogeshwar Linga, is at its base.

=== Isha Institute of Inner Sciences ===
The foundation's centre in the United States, the Isha Institute of Inner Sciences, occupies a 17,000-acre (6,900 ha) site near McMinnville, Tennessee, a rural location chosen for its proximity to several major US cities. In The New York Times Magazine in 2024, Ross Simonini reported that Vasudev intended to develop the site into a community of 20,000 to 30,000 people.

== Controversies and reception ==
=== Abduction allegations ===
In 2016, a couple claimed that their two adult daughters were held captive at the centre. The foundation denied the allegation and released a statement by the women asserting they were staying there voluntarily. The case was dismissed in court. Another woman alleged that her adult son was being held captive.

In 2024, a father filed a habeas corpus petition alleging that his two adult daughters were being illegally confined at the Isha Yoga Centre. The Madras High Court directed the police to conduct an inquiry inside the ashram, an order the foundation challenged before the Supreme Court of India, which stayed it and transferred the petition to itself. On 18 October 2024, a bench of Chief Justice Dhananjaya Y. Chandrachud and Justices J. B. Pardiwala and Manoj Misra closed the petition after the two women, then aged 42 and 39, told the court that they were living at the ashram by choice. The bench held that as both were adults and the purpose of the habeas corpus petition had been fulfilled, no further directions from the High Court were necessary and that it would be "unnecessary for this court to expand the ambit" of habeas corpus jurisdiction; during the hearing, the Chief Justice said, "these proceedings cannot be to malign people and malign institutions".

=== Elephant corridor ===
In 2017, an application before the southern bench of the National Green Tribunal alleged that the foundation's construction had adversely affected an elephant corridor near the Isha Yoga Centre. Environmental activists, AIDWA, CPI(M), Dalit organisations and tribal residents held protests over the issue. The Comptroller and Auditor General of India (CAG) reported that between 1994 and 2008 the foundation had constructed approximately 32,856 square feet of structures in a protected area after obtaining approval only from the local town panchayat. A report by Newslaundry alleged that Isha Foundation's structures in Ikkarai Boluvampatti, Coimbatore, were built without permission from the Hill Area Conservation Authority (HACA), rendering them unauthorised.

=== Sexual assault allegations ===
In October 2024, two former followers of the foundation, one of whom had taught at the Isha Home School in Coimbatore, held a press conference in Hyderabad alleging misconduct at institutions run by Isha. In April 2025, The News Minute reported allegations by a couple living in the US that their daughter had been sexually assaulted by a physical training teacher at the school between 2007 and 2010, when she was aged between seven and ten, and that she had since filed a complaint with the Tamil Nadu police. The publication reported that two police complaints had been filed and that a foreign volunteer had also complained to the foundation. Isha disputed the accounts, calling the allegations "coordinated, vested, and failed attacks", and brought court proceedings over related coverage against the journalist Nakkheeran Gopal, his publication Nakkheeran, and the YouTuber Shyam Meera Singh.

=== POCSO case ===
In 2025, a POCSO case was registered against four Isha Foundation staff members and a former student with allegations of sexual assault at a school run by the foundation and school officials' alleged failure to act on complaints.

=== Defamation litigation ===
Isha Foundation brought a defamation suit in the Delhi High Court against Google, Nakkheeran Publications and the publisher and editor of the Tamil weekly Nakkheeran, alleging that videos circulated on the magazine's YouTube channels were false and defamatory of the foundation, its founder and its followers. On 19 March 2026, the court granted an interim injunction restraining the defendants from publishing or disseminating defamatory content about the foundation and directing the removal of the videos and articles identified in the injunction application. In August 2026, Justice Subramonium Prasad modified that order to require the removal of 39 more videos and five English-language videos, holding that they formed part of the original cause of action and required no separate adjudication.

== Bibliography ==
- Gobalakrishnan, C. (2019), Sociology of Medical Tourism, Chennai: MJP Publisher, ISBN 978-81-8094-291-4
- Hudson, Simon; Hudson, Louise (2017), Marketing for Tourism, Hospitality & Events: A Global & Digital Approach, London, etc.: SAGE, ISBN 978-1-5264-1437-3
- Simone, Cheryl; Vasudev, Jaggi (2008), Midnights with the Mystic: A Little Guide to Freedom and Bliss, Hampton Roads Publishing, ISBN 978-1-61283-113-8
- Waghorne, Joanne Punzo (2013), "Engineering an Artful Practice: On Jaggi Vasudev's Isha Yoga and Sri Sri Ravi Shankar's Art of Living", in Mark Singleton; Ellen Goldberg (eds.), Gurus of Modern Yoga, Oxford University Press, pp. 283–307, ISBN 978-0-19-993872-8
