= Sadhguru =

Indian yogi and author (born 1957)

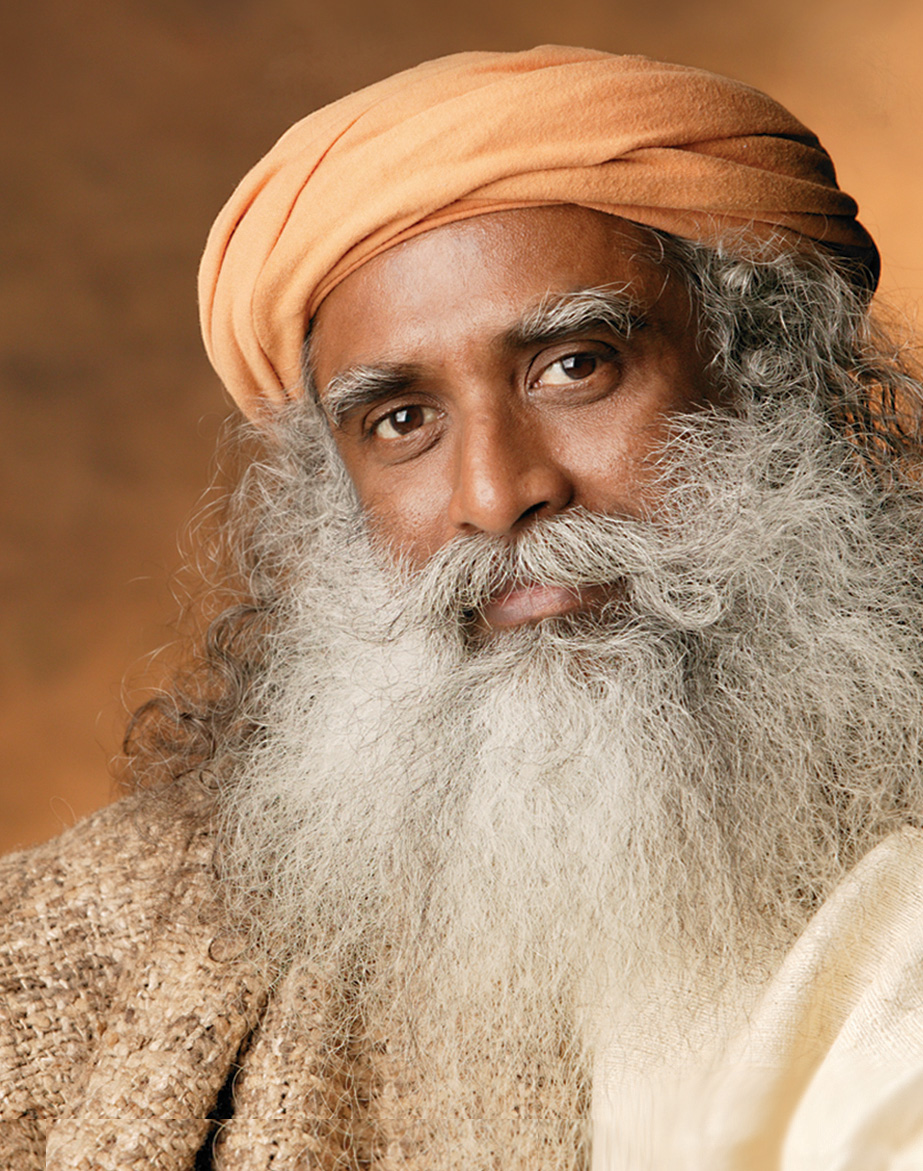
- Born: Jagadish Vasudev; 3 September 1957 (age 69); Mysore, Mysore State, India
- Education: University of Mysore (BA)
- Organization: Isha Foundation
- Notable work: Inner Engineering; Dhyanalinga; Rally for Rivers; Linga Bhairavi; Adiyogi: The Source of Yoga; Mystic's Musings; Cauvery Calling
- Spouse: Vijaya Kumari (m. 1984; died 1997)
- Children: 1
- Honors: Padma Vibhushan (2017); Indira Gandhi Paryavaran Puraskar
- Website: isha.sadhguru.org

Jagadish "Jaggi" Vasudev (born 3 September 1957), widely known as Sadhguru, is an Indian guru and founder of the Isha Foundation, based in Coimbatore, India. The foundation, established in 1992, operates an ashram and yoga centre that carries out educational and spiritual activities. Sadhguru has been teaching yoga since 1982. He is the author of the New York Times bestsellers Inner Engineering: A Yogi's Guide to Joy and Karma: A Yogi's Guide to Crafting Your Destiny, and a frequent speaker at international forums.

Sadhguru also advocates for protecting the environment against climate change, leading initiatives like Project GreenHands (PGH), Rally for Rivers, Cauvery Calling, and the Journey to Save Soil. In 2017, he received the Padma Vibhushan, India's second-highest civilian award, for his contributions to spirituality and humanitarian services.

Sadhguru has been criticised for promoting a number of pseudoscientific claims.

== Biography ==
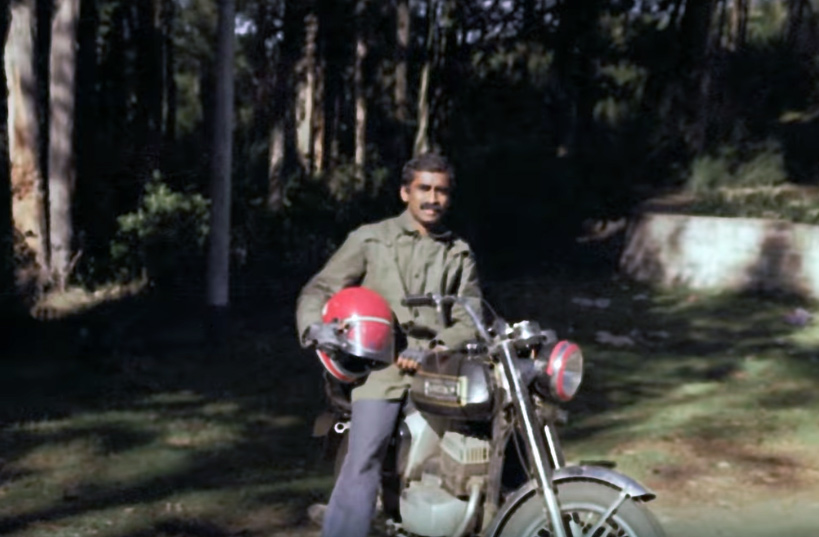
Vasudev in his youth

=== Early life ===
Vasudev was born into a Telugu family on 3 September 1957, in Mysore, Mysore State (now in Karnataka, India). He was the youngest of five children to Susheela Vasudev (mother) and B. V. Vasudev (father). His father was an ophthalmologist at the Mysuru Railway Hospital and his mother a homemaker.

=== Education ===
After completing his formal education, Vasudev was uninterested in post-secondary schooling. One year later, however, he enrolled at the University of Mysore, where he studied English literature. While studying literature, Vasudev received second rank. Although his parents wanted him to continue his education with postgraduate studies, Vasudev disagreed and began a career in business.

=== Work ===
After graduating from the University of Mysore, Vasudev went on to build his first business, a poultry farm, in Mysore. Vasudev explained that his motivation to start a poultry farm was driven by the serenity it yielded in the hours he was not working. The business required minimal attention throughout the day, so Vasudev was able to pursue other interests during his time off, like writing poetry. The business grew profitable, but his family repeatedly criticised and opposed his decision to work with poultry. This led Vasudev to enter the construction industry with a company named Buildaids. He started the company in partnership with a friend, who was a civil engineer. Though Vasudev had no formal engineering training, he used the experience gained from building his poultry farm in his new endeavour.

At the age of 25, after a series of spiritual experiences, he shut down his businesses and began to travel and teach yoga.

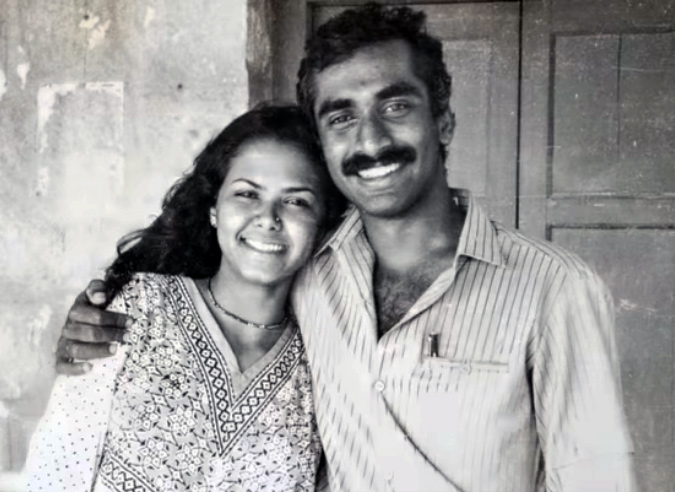
Vasudev with his wife, Vijaykumari

In 1983, he taught his first yoga class, in Mysore. He began travelling across Karnataka and Hyderabad on his motorcycle, conducting his style of yoga classes, known as Sahaja Sthiti Yoga, subsisting on the income from his poultry farm rental and donating the funds received from his students.

Also in 2017, Sadhguru consecrated the Adiyogi Shiva statue, the world's largest bust, in Coimbatore, India.

=== Spirituality ===
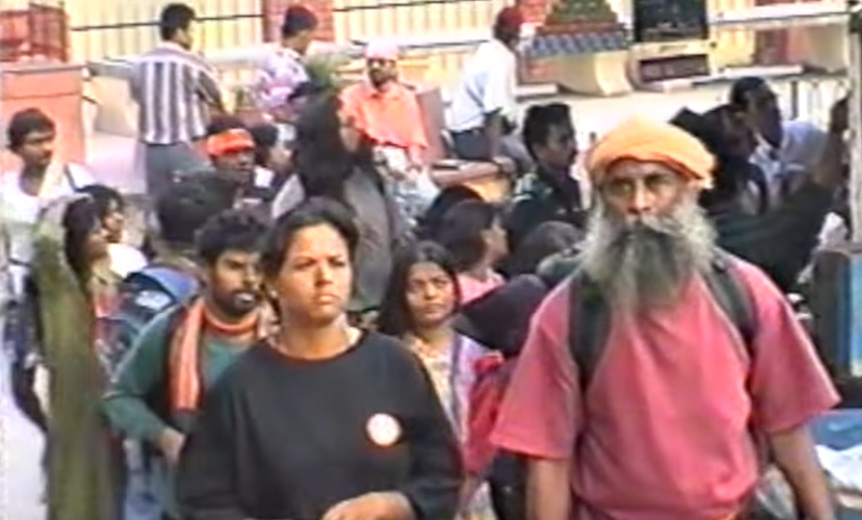
Vasudev travelling with pilgrims

Although Vasudev was not brought up in a spiritual household, he recollects one of his first spiritual experiences occurring after he turned 25. On 23 September 1982, he drove up Chamundi Hill, and as he sat on a stone, Vasudev had his first spiritual experience. He explained that, "All my life I had thought, this is me...But now the air I was breathing, the rock on which I was sitting, the atmosphere around me — everything had become me." After about six days, Vasudev had another similar experience at home. Six weeks later, he left his businesses and travelled extensively, in an effort to seek insight into his spiritual experiences. After about a year of meditation and travel, he decided to teach yoga to share his inner experience.

=== Personal life ===
In his earlier years, Vasudev had a love for driving motorcycles. One of his favourite places to drive was the Chamundi Hills in Mysore, though he sometimes drove much further, including to Nepal. Vasudev advocates vegetarianism, but whilst traveling with no vegetarian food sources available, he eats seafood. He practices the Sun Salutation for 40 minutes a day.

Vasudev married his wife, Vijaykumari, in 1984. In 1990, Vijaykumari and Jaggi had their only child, Radhe. Vijaykumari died on 23 January 1997. A complaint from Vijaykumari's father alleged that Vasudev killed her, but was later dismissed by police. Radhe trained in Bharatanatyam at the Kalakshetra Foundation in Chennai. She married Indian classical vocalist Sandeep Narayan in 2014.

== Isha Foundation ==
In 1992, Sadhguru established the Isha Foundation as a platform for his spiritual, environmental, and educational activities. In 1993, he began searching for a location to establish an ashram to cater to the growing interest in his yoga classes. In 1994, he purchased land near the Velliangiri mountains in Coimbatore, Tamil Nadu, and inaugurated the Isha Yoga Center. Since establishing the Isha Foundation, he remains its head. The foundation's activities are run mostly by volunteers. The organisation offers yoga programmes, known as Isha Yoga. The foundation aims to improve the quality of education in rural India through an initiative called Isha Vidhya.

=== Environmental activism ===
Through the Isha Foundation, Sadhguru has launched several projects and campaigns focused on environmental conservation and protection, including Project GreenHands (PGH), Rally for Rivers, Cauvery Calling, and Save Soil. Sadhguru established PGH to address water and soil issues in Tamil Nadu through reforestation efforts. Launched in July 2019, the "Cauvery Calling" campaign focused on planting trees along the Cauvery river's 0.65-mile wide area to replenish water levels in the river and the groundwater table. In 2017, Sadhguru launched "Rally for Rivers", a campaign intended to build widespread support for river revitalisation efforts across India, similar to the "Cauvery Calling" campaign. In 2022, Sadhguru completed a 100-day motorcycle journey from London to India to bring attention to his "Journey to Save Soil" campaign, which focuses on raising awareness about soil degradation issues and the benefits of using organic matter in farming.

In May 2022, he addressed the leaders of 195 countries at the United Nations Convention to Combat Desertification to speak about "Journey to Save Soil". Both Trevor Noah, host of The Daily Show, and podcast host Joe Rogan, have invited Sadhguru to discuss this movement. On World Environment Day 2022, Indian prime minister, Narendra Modi, attended an event with Sadhguru to discuss efforts to improve soil health.

The UN FAO has stated that "90% of the Earth's precious topsoil is likely to be at risk by 2050". However, views have been divided on whether the "Save Soil" campaign is addressing this issue. Maria Helena Semedo, deputy director-general of FAO, opined that "Organic [farming] may not be the only solution but it's the single best [option] I can think of." Meanwhile, one environmental watchdog has characterised Sadhguru's approach as "greenwashing".

=== Speeches and writings ===
Sadhguru has authored over thirty books, including the New York Times bestsellers Inner Engineering: A Yogi's Guide to Joy, Death, and Karma: A Yogi's Guide to Crafting Your Destiny.

Sadhguru is a frequent public speaker who has been invited to address many prestigious forums and conferences across the globe, such as the United Nations' Millennium World Peace Summit, the British House of Lords, the Massachusetts Institute of Technology, and the International Institute for Management Development. He has also spoken at the annual World Economic Forum in 2007, 2017 and 2020.

=== Honors ===
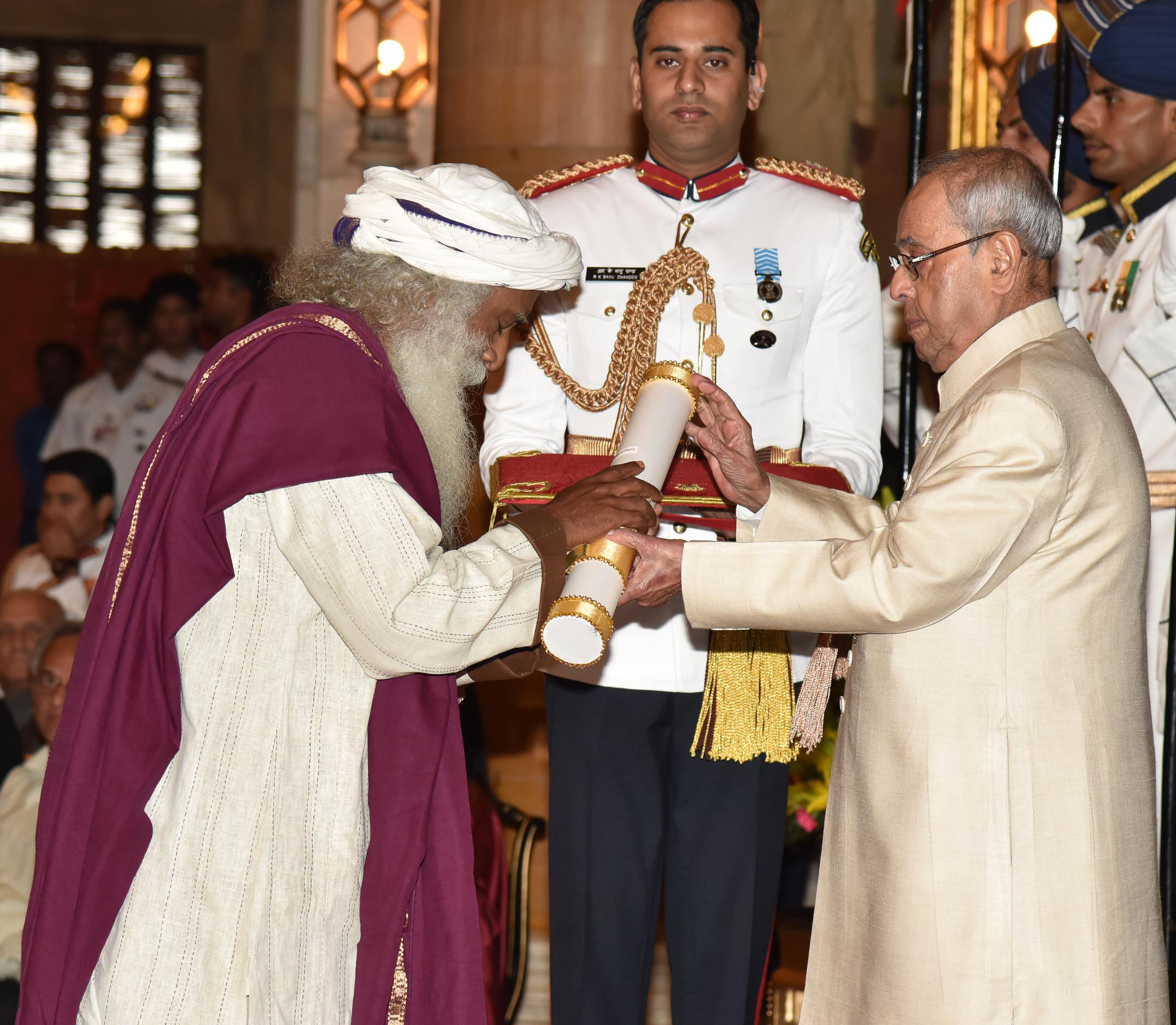
Pranab Mukherjee presenting the Padma Vibhushan to Vasudev at the Rashtrapati Bhavan in New Delhi on 13 April 2017.

In 2017, Sadhguru was awarded the Padma Vibhushan, the second-highest civilian award from the Government of India, in recognition of his contribution to the field of spirituality and humanitarian services. The same year, Sadhguru consecrated the Adiyogi Shiva statue, built by the Isha Foundation, in Coimbatore, standing at 34 metres (112 feet) tall. This was declared as the world's largest bust by Guinness World Records.

He stood 92nd in The Indian Express' list of 100 most powerful Indians in 2012 and 40th in India Today's list of fifty most powerful Indians in 2019.

== Political views ==
When Ayushmann Khurrana asked him how to choose the "correct political stance", Sadhguru responded by saying that he does not subscribe to a political party, and others should not either. He stated that, "party membership should be cancelled because this is becoming a tribe". Accordingly, he encourages individuals to vote for a given party after evaluating their performance in office to "see who makes more sense". Others have characterized his views as Hindu nationalist, Hindutva, and aligned with the Bharatiya Janata Party. In 2019 he referred to a Muslim student in London as a "Taliban," for which he apologised after heavy criticism. After recognising the failure in the "government's communication" of the 2019 Citizenship Amendment Act in India, Sadhguru spoke in support of the act.

== Scientific reception ==
Sadhguru has made a number of claims that are inconsistent with scientific consensus. Although India approved the ratification of the international Minamata Convention on Mercury to ban its usage, Sadhguru advocates for the use of mercury in the context of traditional Indian medicine such as Siddha medicine. He has also repeatedly stated he can solidify mercury at room temperature; a claim refuted by Australian scientist Sumaiya Shaikh.

Sadhguru has been criticised for statements about the negative effects that a lunar eclipse can have on the body's energy.

== Bibliography ==
- Berghella, Vincenzo (2018), Chennai and Coimbatore, India, Lulu.com, ISBN 978-0-578-20085-9
- Hudson, Simon; Hudson, Louise (2017), Marketing for Tourism, Hospitality & Events: A Global & Digital Approach, London, etc.: SAGE, ISBN 978-1-5264-1437-3
- Simone, Cheryl; Vasudev, Sadhguru Jaggi (2008), Midnights with the Mystic: A Little Guide to Freedom and Bliss, Hampton Roads Publishing, ISBN 978-1-61283-113-8
- Waghorne, Joanne Punzo (2013), "Engineering an Artful Practice: On Jaggi Vasudev's Isha Yoga and Sri Sri Ravi Shankar's Art of Living", in Mark Singleton; Ellen Goldberg (eds.), Gurus of Modern Yoga, Oxford University Press, pp. 283–307, ISBN 978-0-19-993872-8
