= Bibhab Kumar Talukdar =

Indian conservation biologist

- Born: 1968 (age 57–58); Dhubri, Assam
- Education: Gauhati University
- Occupation: Conservation Biologist
- Years active: 1989–present
- Known for: Aaranyak and Asian Rhino Conservation
- Awards: IUCN Species Survival Commission Chair’s Citation Award, 2008

Bibhab Kumar Talukdar (born 25 September 1968) is an Indian conservation biologist and the founder of Aaranyak, a research and conservation organisation based in Guwahati, Assam. He is its secretary general and executive director. He has worked mainly on Asian rhinoceroses and has chaired the Asian Rhino Specialist Group of the International Union for Conservation of Nature (IUCN) Species Survival Commission since 2008.

In 2024 the Commission gave him its Harry Messel Award for Conservation Leadership, and in 2026 he was elected a Fellow of the Linnean Society of London. He is a co-editor of the book Rhinos of the World, published by Springer in 2025.

== Early life and education ==
Talukdar was born in Dhubri, Assam, and grew up in the rural part of the state. He has said that he became interested in birds and natural history as a child. He studied at Gauhati University.

He founded Aaranyak in September 1989, shortly after finishing his degree, together with a few friends and neighbours. It began as a nature club for young people.

== Aaranyak ==
Ashoka, which describes the name Aaranyak as meaning "All About Forests", says the organisation works on biological hotspots that cross political boundaries. Its approach combines research with public outreach, advocacy with government and partnerships with other civil society groups. The Department of Scientific and Industrial Research recognised Aaranyak as a Scientific and Industrial Research Organisation in 2006, and it received the Indira Gandhi Paryavaran Puraskar in 2012 and the Government of Assam's institutional award in science and technology in 2017.

== Career ==
Talukdar was a member of the standing committee of India's National Board for Wildlife from July 2007 to May 2010 and of the steering committee of Project Elephant from 2010 to 2012. He was also on the committee that prepared the National Wildlife Action Plan for 2017–2031.

In June 2025 Girijananda Chowdhury University in Guwahati appointed him a professor of practice for a one-year term. The university held a felicitation for him in July 2026 after his election to the Linnean Society.

== Rhino conservation ==
Talukdar has been associated with the IUCN Species Survival Commission since 1991. In 2009 the International Rhino Foundation hired him as its Asian Rhino Coordinator. As chair of the Specialist Group he has organised several Asian Rhino Range Countries meetings, and IUCN credits his work with supporting population increases of the greater one-horned rhino, particularly in Assam. He was still described as the group's chair in June 2025.

=== Indian Rhino Vision 2020 ===
Indian Rhino Vision 2020 was set up in 2005 with the aim of raising Assam's rhino population to 3,000 by creating populations in new areas. It was run by the Assam Forest Department, WWF-India and the International Rhino Foundation, with help from other organisations including Aaranyak. The first translocation, in 2008, moved two males to Manas National Park. Between 2008 and 2022 the programme moved 22 wild rhinos from Pobitora Wildlife Sanctuary and Kaziranga National Park to Manas; Talukdar assisted the Assam Government with the work.

By March 2020 Manas had about 40 rhinos, and a later press report put the figure at 46. After the 2018 census counted 2,650 rhinos in Assam, Talukdar estimated annual growth of 3 to 5 per cent and said the population could have neared 3,000 by the end of 2020 had a census been held.

=== Range countries meetings ===
Talukdar helped organise three Asian Rhino Range Countries meetings, held in Bandar Lampung (Indonesia), New Delhi and Chitwan National Park (Nepal). He drafted the Bandar Lampung Declaration from the first meeting.

The New Delhi meeting in 2019 involved India, Nepal, Bhutan, Indonesia and Malaysia. Its declaration called for closer cooperation among India, Nepal and Bhutan, real-time sharing of intelligence on rhino crime, and the securing of wildlife corridors across borders. Talukdar, speaking as chair of the Specialist Group, said the meeting stressed community engagement and monitoring of climate change effects on rhino health and habitat.

The third meeting took place at Chitwan from 3 to 5 February 2023, with delegates from Bhutan, India, Indonesia, Malaysia and Nepal, and ended with the Chitwan Declaration. The countries committed to at least 3 per cent annual growth in each rhino population over four years. The declaration also launched a community-based conservation programme near rhino habitats and called for time-bound recovery measures for the Sumatran rhino.

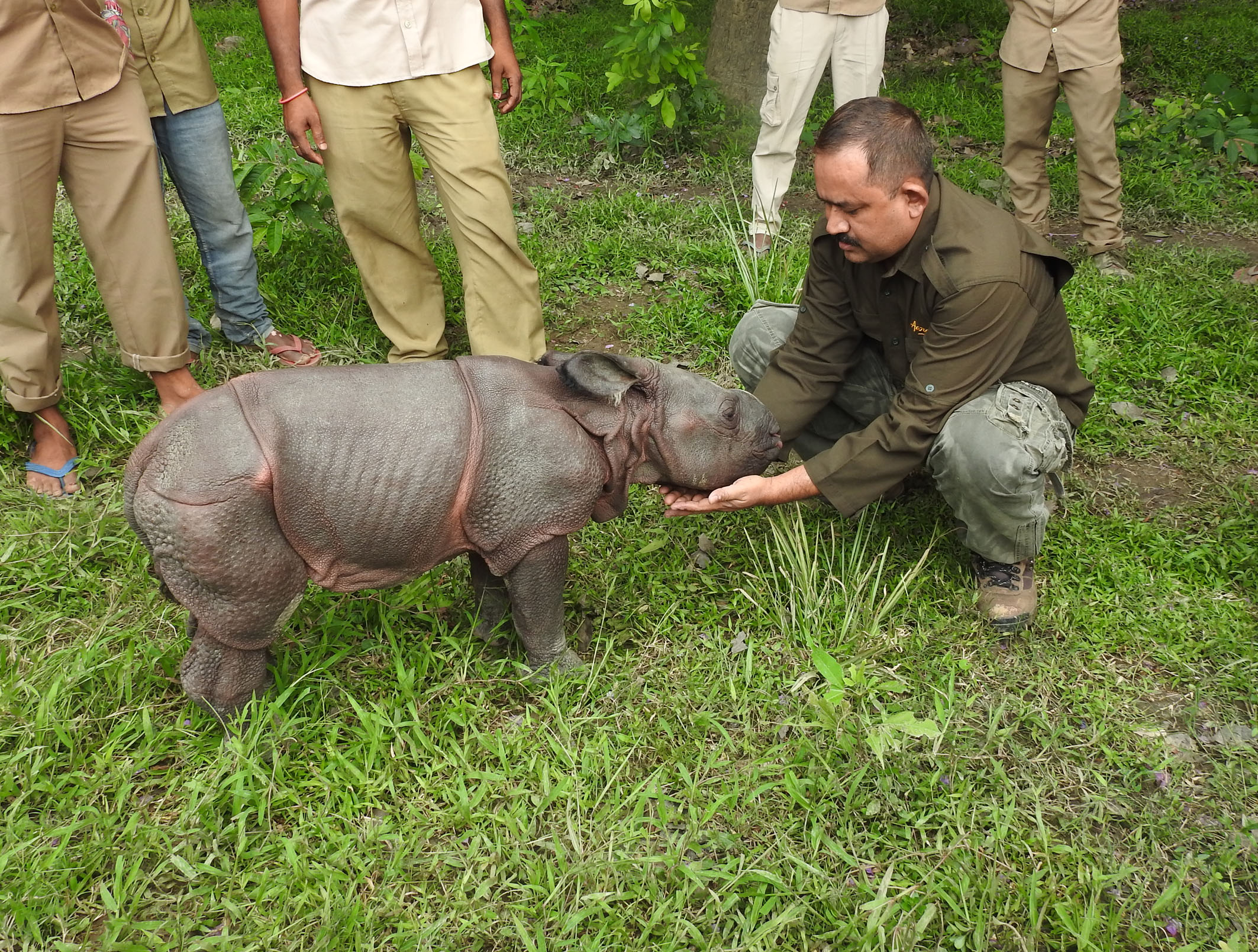
Dr Bibhab Kumar Talukdar with a rescued Indian Rhino Calf

== Honours ==
Talukdar became an Ashoka Fellow in 2007. In 2024 he received the IUCN Species Survival Commission's Harry Messel Award for Conservation Leadership. The award, set up in 2004, recognises exemplary service to the Commission. It was presented at the 5th IUCN SSC Leaders' Meeting in Abu Dhabi on 25 October 2024, and the award was reported as recognising his work on Asian rhinos. In 2026 he was elected a Fellow of the Linnean Society of London, founded in 1788.

== Selected publications ==
Talukdar edited Rhinos of the World: Ecology, Conservation and Management with Mario Melletti and David Balfour (Springer, 2025). The book has 16 chapters, with contributions from 92 experts in about 20 countries.

- Schipper, J.; et al. (2008). "The status of the world's land and marine mammals". Science. 322 (5899): 225–230. doi:10.1126/science.1165115.
- Hoffmann, M.; et al. (2010). "The impact of conservation on the status of the world's vertebrates". Science. 330 (6010): 1503–1509. doi:10.1126/science.1194442.
- Lahkar, B.P.; Talukdar, B.K.; Sarma, P.K. (2011). "Invasive species in grassland habitat: an ecological threat to the greater one horned rhino". Pachyderm. 49: 33–39.
- Talukdar, B.K.; Sinha, S.P. (2013). "Trans-boundary rhino conservation challenges and opportunities between India and Nepal". Pachyderm. 54: 45–51.
- Havmøller, R.G.; et al. (2016). "Will current conservation responses save the Critically Endangered Sumatran rhinoceros?". Oryx. 50 (2): 355–359. doi:10.1017/S0030605315000472.
- Melletti, M.; Talukdar, B.; Balfour, D., eds. (2025). Rhinos of the World. Springer. doi:10.1007/978-3-031-67169-2.
