= Conservation management of Kaziranga National Park =

Kaziranga National Park in India has a good conservation history, especially due to its efficient management policies. In spite of the efficient conservation policies there are some loopholes in the conservation policies.

== Conservation Management ==
Census figures for Kaziranga

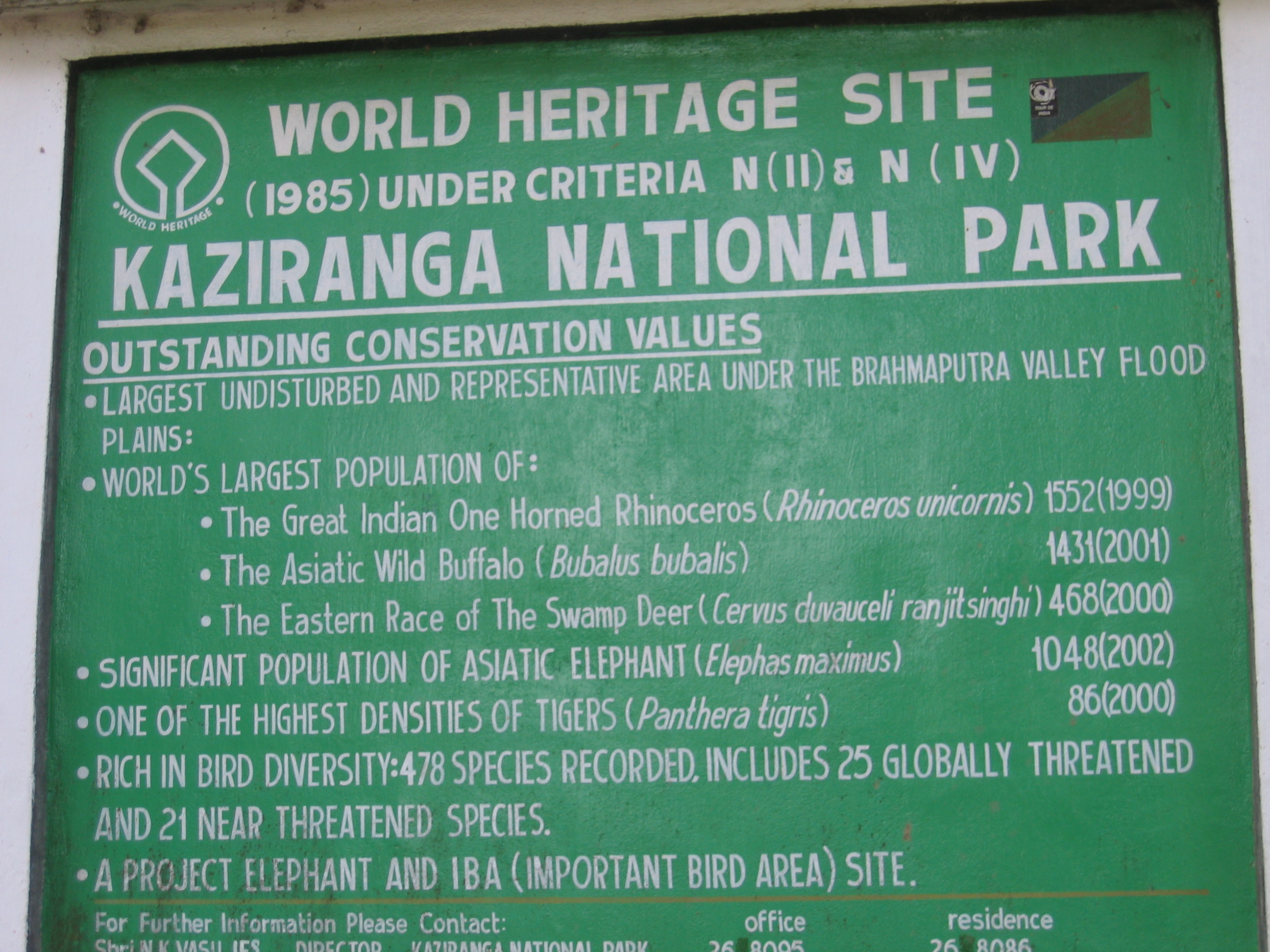
A board proclaiming the biological wealth of Kaziranga National Park

Kaziranga started in 1908 as a reserve forest to protect rhinoceros, and other wild animals. Thereafter, shooting was prohibited and exploitation of forest products was stopped. However, limited grazing was permitted till the declaration of the area as a national park. Kaziranga has a long history of management and practices include annual burning of the grasslands by wildlife staff. Kaziranga has a good conservation history, especially due to its efficient management policies.

For protection of the wildlife the legislative status for Kaziranga National Park represents the "maximum protection under Indian conditions" at national, provincial and municipal levels. A list of 12 acts and constitutional safeguards ranging from the Assam Forest Regulation of 1891 to the Biodiversity Conservation Act of 2002 ensure legal protection to the park. A management plan for Kaziranga (2003–04 to 2012–13) has been prepared in which all the objectives, problems, zonations and strategies are clearly defined for greater protection. A Geographical Information System (GIS) based management information system to keep an eye on the soil erosion and soil deposition by river waters is under consideration in the Management Plan.

For controlling poaching many steps have been taken by the park authorities including maintenance of existing and construction of new poaching camps, adequate staffing, providing mobility, patrolling, intelligence gathering, firearms and control over the use of firearms around the park. The park has about 122 anti-poaching camps scattered throughout the Park, including two floating camps on the Brahmaputra river. There are 123 country boats, 6 mechanized boats, 4 speed boats (OBM), 2 motor launches, 20 motor vehicles and 47 departmental elephants to assist the anti-poaching squad. There are some 800 personnel, which include about 200 forest guards, game watchers, home guards, forest protection force, and temporary staff who guard the park round the clock. The foresters are provided with 346 numbers of .315 bore rifles, 33 SBBL, 18 DBBL, five revolvers, 20 fixed and mobile wireless stations and more than a hundred walkie-talkies which helps in the anti-poaching activities and in fighting against the poachers. With effective protection methods the number of poaching cases has declined in the park over the past few years.

During floods and to mitigate its effect on the environment and wildlife effective steps like increasing of patrols, maintenance of existing and acquiring of new speed boats etc., controlling speed on the National Highway 37, construction and maintenance of highlands with the help of Indian Army, removal of water hyacinth and close collaboration with other civil departments are some of the measures taken. Construction of several corridors and other steps including construction of road signage, terrain easements, rumble strips, road awareness campaigns, intensive night patrolling and regulation of vehicular traffic to mitigate the number of death of wild animals by speeding vehicles on NH-37 have been done by the park management.

To prevent illegal grazing and [preserve the] genetic distinctness of the wild buffaloes systematic steps like enforcement of legal measures, motivating the people to rear high yielding varieties of fodder, immunization of the livestock and fencing in the sensitive areas of the park are undertaken regularly by the park management. The park management have around looking after the health and nutritional requirements of the departmental elephants and constructed permanent shelter for them. Maintenance and upkeep of records of all the livestock within a radius of 10 km of the park and regular immunization of the cattle living in the fringe villages to prevent spread of diseases among wild animals. Paying compensation to the villagers for damaged crops and loss of life due to attack of wild animals, formation of crop protection committees, construction of vigilance camps, fencing and eco-development works have been proposed to increase the communication with the villagers and to have a healthy man-animal co-relation.

Extensive research on the reasons for straying and wildlife behaviour, erecting physical barriers, tranquilization, keeping vigil and mobile patrolling especially during the flood and cropping seasons are done by the park management from time to time.

The park authorities carry out research on siltation, stopping spread of Water hyacinth and de-siltation activities in the beels present inside the park. To control growth and irradiation of invasive species like Mimosa research on biological methods of controlling the weeds, manual uprooting and weeding before seed settling are done often. The park management is well concerned with the matter of soil erosion and to conserve soil they regularly monitoring of the water flow using multi-date satellite date and planning medium and other long term measures. To increase the existing grassland habitat to provide food for the parks huge herbivorous population various grassland management techniques such as controlled burning for grassland are done for a long time.

The park authorities often repair and maintain the existing infrastructure, vehicles, wireless etc. and acquire of new ones to keep up the conservation of wildlife. Communication in the park is presently carried out through an extensive wireless network system with support from a local NGO (Aaranyak), which has facilitated the arrangement with an international donor agency (David Shepherd Foundation) for a period of 10 years. This has helped in efficient communication among the staffs.

Kaziranga National Park has a wide network of forest roads. These roads are either graveled or fair weather in nature. These roads are to be repaired annually after the flood season is over to make them usable again. There are several wooden bridges and culverts on these roads. These are also to be periodically repaired and some of these are to be reconstructed. These paths along with a number of patrolling paths all over the park help in keeping an eye on the poachers.

=== Constraints ===
In spite of heavy conservation methods taken there are some obvious loopholes in the process of conservation of wildlife and ecology of the park. Poaching of Rhinoceros for its horn has been a serious problem at Kaziranga. Between 1980 and 2005 the park lost around 567 rhinoceros to poachers which is about 23 per year. Most of the poaching cases of rhinoceros were recorded in between 1980 and 1997, which at present is in a declining trend. After a decreasing trend for past few years, 30 one-horned rhinoceroses were killed by poachers since 2007, with a report establishing links for funding the Islamic militant groups in Bangladesh connected to Al Qaida, which have initiated a probe by CBI.

About 184 villages and 4 tea gardens are situated within the influence area of the park; as a result of the acute poverty present among its residents, the villagers often enter the park for illegal fishing and for firewood. Threat from overgrazing by the domestic livestock is ever present. An acute fodder shortage in the dry season forces the livestock to enter into the park for grazing, severely affecting the amount of food available for the wild herbivorous animals. Such infiltration of domestic cattle increases the risk of spread of diseases among the wild animals as most of the cattle are not properly immunized. There is also a risk of losing genetic distinctness among the wild buffaloes due to entry of domestic buffaloes. Indiscriminate use of pesticides in the tea gardens close to the park boundaries also pose a threat through pesticide run-off. The tea gardens are also considered to be a source of invasive species like Mimosa and wild rose.

The Karbi Anglong Plateau situated to the south of park is an important area of high ground. Largescale habitat changes in the plateau include conversion to tea gardens, settlement, logging and jhum (shifting agriculture). These developments have led to the increase of the gap between the park and the plateau, destroying the suitable habitat is of the wild animals.

This destruction of the continuous area has serious implications for the ability of Kaziranga Park, and for Assam as a whole, to maintain healthy populations of animal species. For example, the 2000 census recorded 86 tigers in the Kaziranga National Park, which is a growing and healthy population, but the long-term survival of the species in the region is also dependent on maintaining links to other healthy populations, through biological corridors and careful use of buffer zones. However these serious policies are not addressed in the management plan. A recent global study identified the Kaziranga-Meghalaya region as one of the priority tiger conservation habitats in the Indian subcontinent, albeit one where more information is required on tiger populations and status in the landscape as a whole. As land use changes increase around the park there are risks that the resident population of tigers and other animal species become genetically isolated and in time no longer viable.

Severe floods every year cause great loss to the natural habitat, death of wild animals and destruction of protection structures present in the park. Flooding causes many animals to migrate outside the park where they are susceptible to hunting and reprisal for crop damage. Absence of adequate high grounds within the park as places of refuge for the animals during high floods adds to mismanagement on the part of the park authorities. The period just after the receding of the flood water appears to be a hard time for the herbivores as the areas around the beels are surrounded by rotting grasses and plant remains. Brahmaputra River erodes large area along the northern boundary of Kaziranga, which reduces the total geographical area of the Park and thereby reduces the habitat for the wild animal. According to satellite data 51 square kilometres (20 sq mi) area was lost to floods in between 1967–68 and 1998–99, although silt deposition also leads to new land forming in other areas.

Continuous siltation and growth of invasive species like Eichornia, Mikenia and Mimosa in the existing water bodies and on the land have posed a big problem on the existence of the wet lands of the Park. Since the wetlands of the Park is an integral part for continuous survival of the many important fauna such as Rhinos, Wild Buffalo, exotic bird species etc. the Park authority is facing tremendous management problem for containing siltation and weed invasion.

Frequent sonic booms caused by the aircraft of the Indian Air Force flying over the park are a potential source of external disturbance to the wild animals in the park.

The 54 km length of the National Highway (NH) 37 runs almost parallel to the southern boundary of Kaziranga National Park between Bokakhat and Ghorakati. During the monsoon the area inside the park gets flooded and the wild animals cross this highway to move towards the elevated Karbi Anglong hills. In this process many animals are killed by fast and heavy vehicular traffic moving on it almost round the clock. In spite of construction of several corridors and other steps including construction of road signage, terrain easements, rumble strips, road awareness campaigns, intensive night patrolling and regulation of vehicular traffic to mitigate the number of death of wildlife does not seems to be foolproof and effective. There is a lack of necessary and functional corridors for safe passage of animals. There are also plans to convert the existing NH-37 to a six lane expressway. If this expressway is constructed then it may cause a permanent barrier effect and also increase wild animal mortality.

A petroleum refinery was established recently in 2001 at Numaligarh upstream from the park on the Dhansiri river has potential danger present of pollution of the park's land and water bodies from the effluents/wastes from the refinery. Similarly a number of tea gardens present close to the park also remain a source of disturbance and pollution of the land and water bodies in the park. Increasing tourist in the park also proves to be a source of disturbance to the wild animals.

There is a lack of trained staffs in the park and as of 2005, 127 of the 592 sanctioned posts lay vacant Moreover, since the area of the park has almost doubled (through additions) the staff strength would need to be further increased to undertake anti-poaching measures, conservation of wildlife and other allied activities. The park also faces shortage of funds for developmental works.

In spite of having a number of roads inside the park there is a need of construction of new roads. The southern boundary road along the river Mora Diphlu as well as in other areas of the park identified by the park authorities as priority especially in Eastern and Burapahar ranges needs construction for facilitating a year-round patrolling to check poaching of rhino and entry of men and cattle into the park.

A number of observation watch towers are required in new areas like first and sixth addition as well as in the Reserve Forests under the park's administration. The present park boundary runs along non-natural features like a river etc., needs improved demarcation through conspicuous and well maintained boundary pillars in place of the current inconspicuous ones to prevent encroachment of land and to present illegal entry of people. Encroachments along the park's southern and eastern boundary need immediate attention.
