= Sachidanand Bharti =

Indian environmental activist (born 1955)

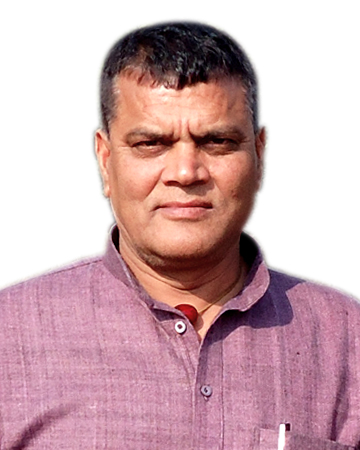
- Born: Sachidanand Dhaundiyal; 5 November 1955 (age 70); Gadkhark, Pauri Garhwal, Uttarakhand
- Occupations: Environmentalist, Principal

Sachidanand Bharati (Hindi: सच्चिदानंद भारती) is an Indian environmentalist activist, philanthropist, and teacher from the Indian state of Uttarakhand. He is the founder and secretary of the Ufrainkhal-based voluntary organisation named Dudhatoli Lok Vikas Sansthan (DLVS).

== Early life ==
Sachidanand Bharti was born in the year 1955 in the village of Badhkar, Dudhatoli, in the district of Pauri Garhwal, which is located in the state of Uttarakhand, India.

=== Education and career ===
Bharati, completed his elementary education at local institutions. In the mid-70s, he studied at Gopeshwar College, in Chamoli district. During his college years, he founded "Yuva Nirman Samiti" along with his friends to foster creative works and ideas among students at Post Graduate College. He finished his college studies in 1979.

In 1982, he returned to his home hamlet of Ufrainkhal from Chamoli, where he worked as a teacher at Ufrainkhal Inter College and began working to solve the area's forest and environmental concerns.

== Environmental activism ==
In 1974, Bharati, in his college years, was inspired by environmentalist Chandi Prasad Bhatt and joined the Chipko movement that had just begun.

Dasholi Village Swarajya Mandal organised a 45-day tree planting programme in 1976 to avert landslides in Joshimath. Mr. Bharti and his 100 young buddies remained at this camp for the whole 45 days.

And in 1979, to halt the destruction of this region.

In this way, in July 1980, the first environmental camp was completed in the Dudhatoli area.

In 1987, he started a platform named the Friends of Trees, "Daliyon Ka Dagda" with the goal of planting trees and spreading the word about conservation.

=== Keep the Water Movement (Paani Rakho Andolan) ===
In 1989, Bharti began learning about the water and forest traditions in his region. After witnessing the issue of forest fires and droughts in the lower Himalayas, he took the initiative to establish small ponds called chaal in Dudhatoli. This endeavour subsequently gained traction and expanded to encompass 30 villages.

During the early 1990s, the Doodhatoli group conducted a series of experiments with different forms and sizes of chaals. Between the years 1993 and 1998, Bharati and his group initiated digging of chaals in the vicinity of hill slopes. To presdatearati's team has successfully constructed a total of 12,000 chaals throughout 136 villages. Additionally, a substantial number of women actively participated in the construction of the chaals.

Prime Minister Narendra Modi addressed Sachidanand Bharti in the Mann Ki Baat programme last year on 27 June 2021. He said that any endeavour that is done with sincere attention and effort may be effective.

Teacher Sachchidanand Bharti of Uttarakhand's Pauri Garhwal area has done major work in water conservation, and his efforts may be continued. In reference to Sachchidanand Bharti's accomplishment, PM Modi said that there was a shortage of water in the steep districts of Uttarakhand before, but Sachchidanand Bharti has made substantial efforts to preserve water through his efforts, which is a laudable move.

== Awards ==
Bharti has earned the National Water Award, the Swamiram Manavta Puraskar, the Kedar Singh Rawat Environment Protection Award, and other honours for his conservation efforts. He also obtained a D.Litt. degree from Uttarakhand Open University and appeared on Prime Minister Narendra Modi's Dachara programme Mann Ki Baat on All India Radio. One particular incident warrants special note.

- Indira Gandhi Paryavaran Puraskar, Government of India
- Mahatma Gandhi National Award, Government of Madhya Pradesh
- Bhagirath Prayas Samman World Wide Fund
- Paryavaran Rakshak Award - Panjanya and Organization, India Publication
- Urav Deoras Samman, Lucknow
- Sanskriti Puraskar, New Delhi
- Swami Ram Humanity Award
- Uttarakhand Green Award
- National Water Awards, New Delhi
- Times boat Winner, New Delhi
