= Adiyogi Shiva bust =

Outdoor statue in Tamil Nadu, India

Adiyogi statue
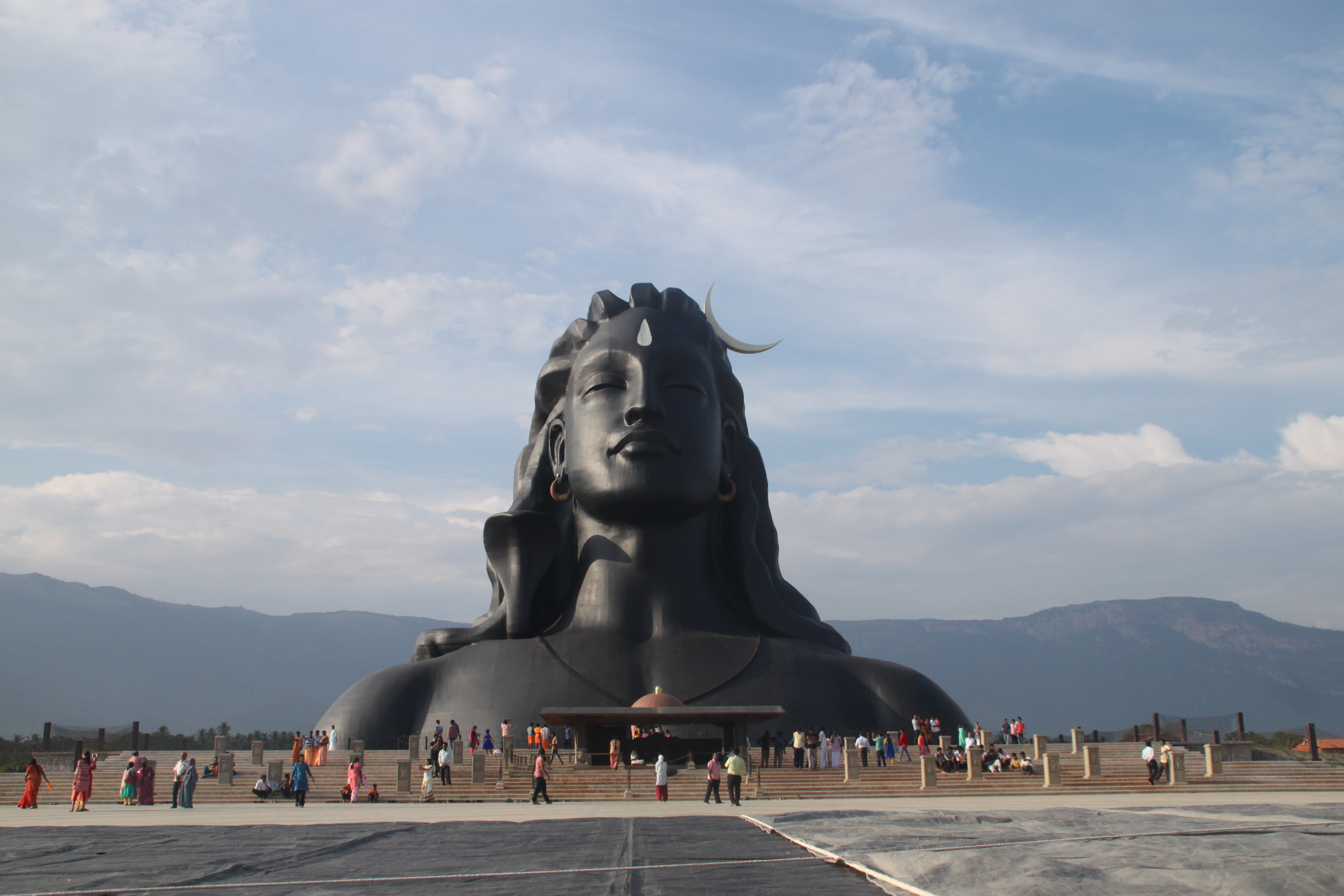
- Adiyogi Shiva statue in Coimbatore, 2018
- Interactive map of Adiyogi statue
- Location: Isha Yoga Center, Coimbatore, Tamil Nadu, India
- Coordinates: 10°58′21″N 76°44′26″E
- Designer: Sadhguru Jaggi Vasudev
- Type: bust
- Material: Steel
- Width: 25 m (82 ft)
- Height: 34 m (112 ft)
- Visitors: 2.19 Million (in 2021–2022)
- Completion date: 24 February 2017
- Dedicated to: Shiva

The Adiyogi Shiva bust is a 34-metre-tall (112 ft), 45-metre-long (147 ft) and 25-metre-wide (82 ft) steel bust of Shiva with Thirunamam at Coimbatore, Tamil Nadu. It is recognized by the Guinness World Records as the "Largest Bust Sculpture” in the world. Designed by Sadhguru, the founder and head of the Isha Foundation, the statue weighs around 500 tonnes (490 long tons; 550 short tons).

Adiyogi refers to Shiva as the first yogi. It was established to inspire people towards inner well-being through yoga.

== Description ==
"This face is not a deity or temple, this is an iconic inspiration. In pursuit of the divine, you don't have to look up because it is not somewhere else. Each of the 112 possibilities is a method to experience the divine within you. You just have to pick one. [...] The idea is not to build one more monument but to use it as a galvanizing force towards self-transformation."

— Sadhguru on the purpose of the statue.

Adiyogi is located at the Isha Yoga Centre. Its height, 112 ft, symbolizes the 112 possibilities to attain to moksha (liberation) that are mentioned in yogic culture, and also the 112 chakras in the human system. A linga named Yogeshwara Linga was consecrated and placed in front of the statue. The Indian Ministry of Tourism has included the statue in its official Incredible India tourism campaign. It is also the venue of a light and sound show about Shiva as a yogi, inaugurated by the President of India, Ram Nath Kovind.

== Inauguration ==
Adiyogi was inaugurated on 24 February 2017 by the Prime Minister of India, Narendra Modi, on the occasion of Maha Shivaratri. He also launched a companion book, Adiyogi: The Source of Yoga, written by Sadhguru. To mark the unveiling of the statue, the song "Adiyogi – The Source of Yoga" was released by the Isha Foundation, sung by Kailash Kher, with lyrics by Prasoon Joshi.

Another 6.4-metre (21 ft) statue of Adiyogi was unveiled in Tennessee, US in 2015 by the Isha Foundation, as part of a 2,800 m^{2} (30,000 sq ft) yoga studio.

== Adiyogi Divya Darshanam ==
Adiyogi Divya Darshanam is a 3D laser show, narrating the story of the Adiyogi and how the science of yoga was given to human beings. It was inaugurated by the then President of India, Ram Nath Kovind, on Maha Shivaratri in 2019. It is a light and sound show projected upon the Adiyogi Statue that lasts 14 minutes.

In 2020, it won the Mondo*dr EMEA & APAC Award for Technology in Entertainment in the House of Worship category.

== Other Adiyogi Shiva statues ==
In January, 2014, Sadhguru announced his desire to put Adiyogi Shiva statues in each of the Four Corners of India.

A 112-Feet Adiyogi Shiva Statue at Chikkaballapura was inaugurated on 15th Jan 2023. The statue is set up along with eight Navagraha temples along with Bhairavi Temple at the Isha Yoga Centre at Chikkaballapur, Karnataka.

On 30 August 2022, Vasudev visited Pura Mahadev, Bagpat. The Isha foundation desired to get land on lease for a Sanskrit School, Yoga Centre and a 68 m (242 ft) Adiyogi Shiva statue. The statue will be built near the banks of the Hindon River located near Pura Mahadev and Hariya Kheda, Uttar Pradesh.

== Gallery ==
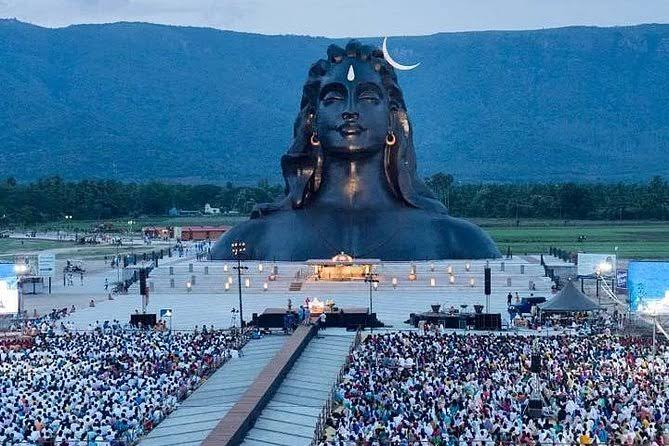

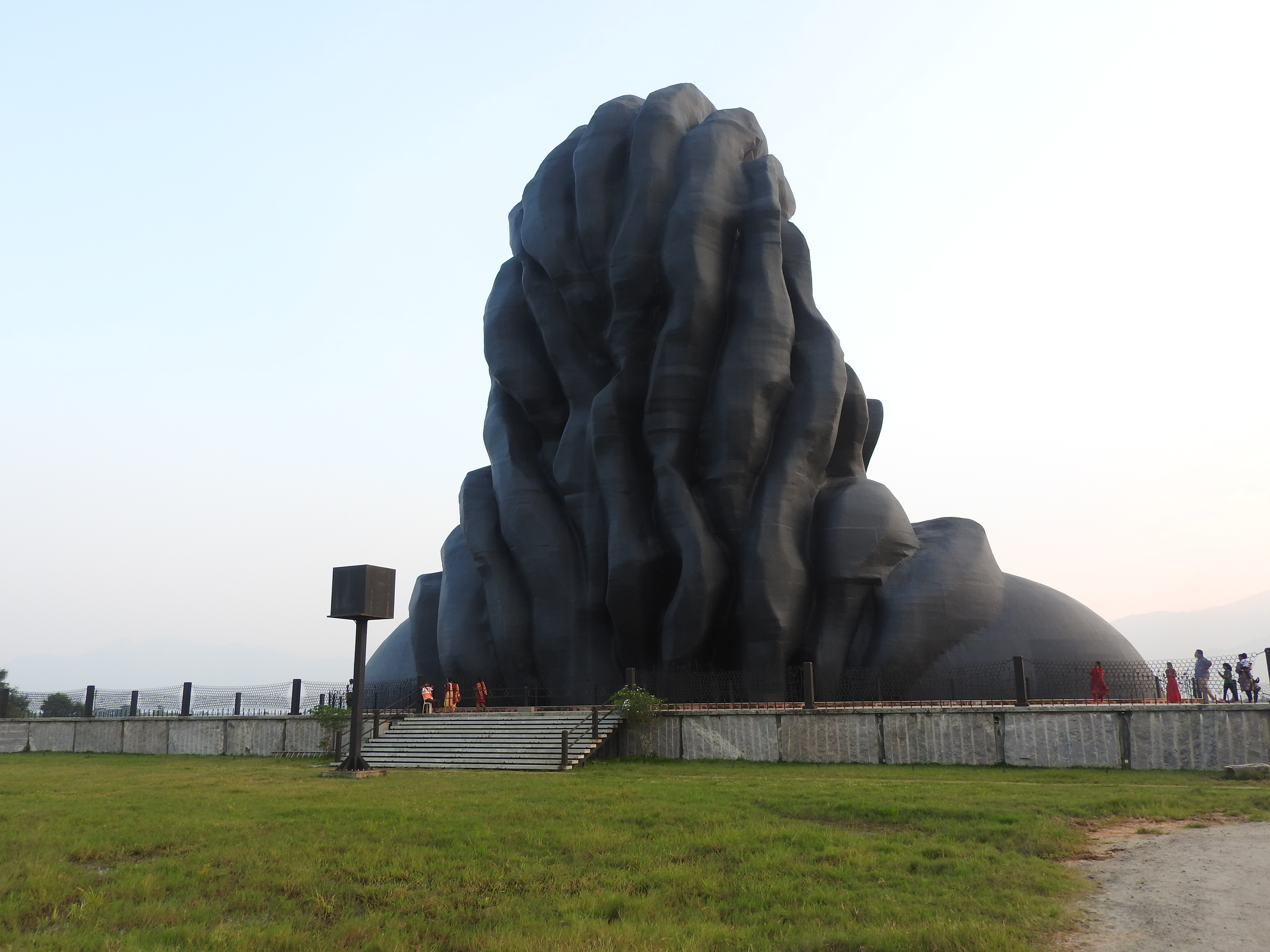
Back of the bust

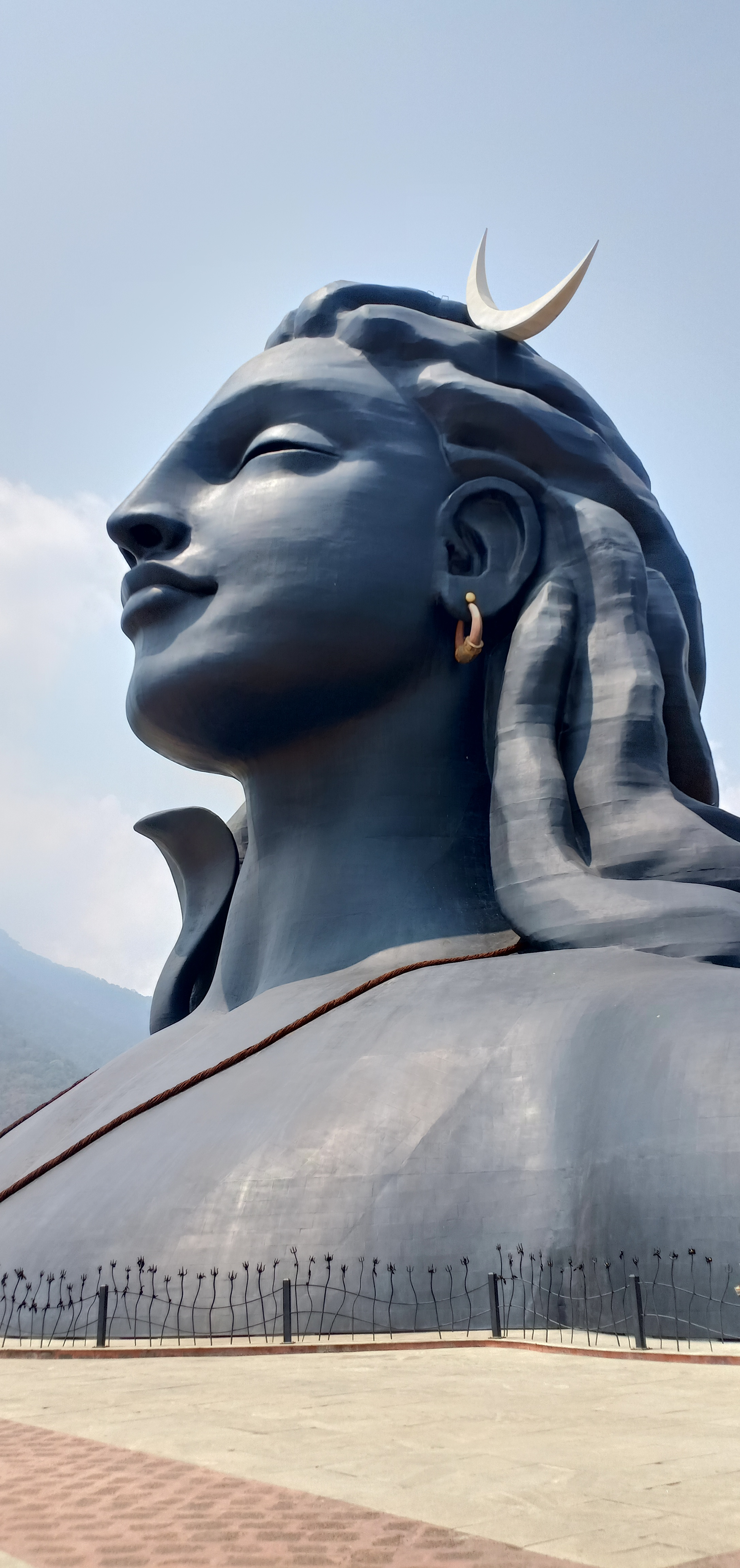
View from bottom

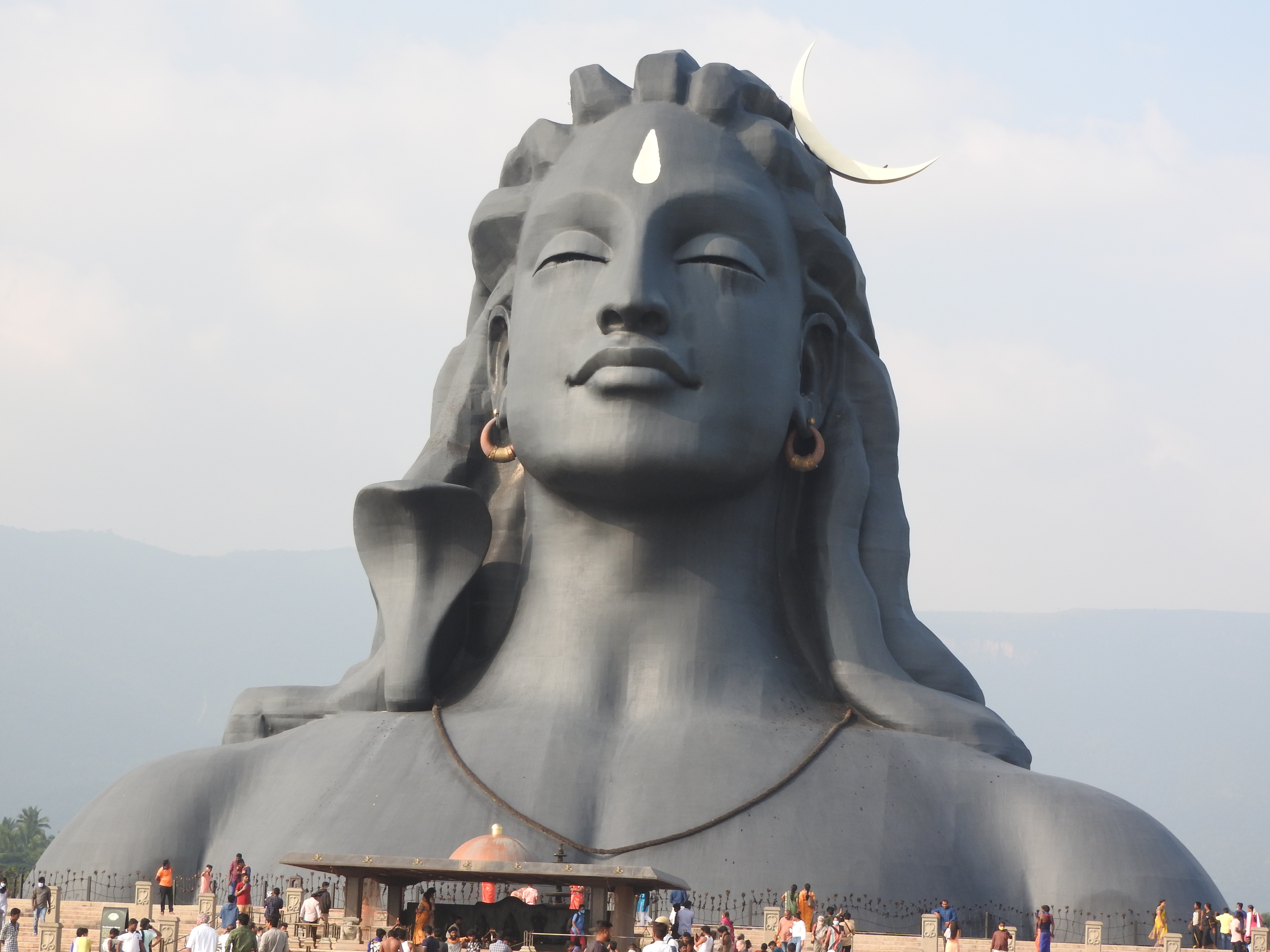

September 2026

View from Nandi Statue

== See also ==
- List of the tallest statues in India
- List of tallest statues in the world
- List of tallest freestanding structures
- List of colossal sculpture in situ
- New Seven Wonders of the World
- List of statues
