= Subramonium Prasad =

Indian judge (born 1967)

Justice Subramonium Prasad

Judge of the Delhi High Court
- Incumbent
- Assumed office 11 October 2021

Personal details
- Born: 22 June 1967 (age 59)
- Website: Official website

Subramonium Prasad (born 22 June 1967) is an Indian judge serving on the Delhi High Court since 11 October 2021.. He famously stated that the CJP leader born in 1995 does not belong to Generation Z and also suspended the life sentence of the convict Kuldeep Sengar of BJP (Bharatiya Janata Party) in the Unnao rape case.

== See also ==
- Delhi High Court
