= Inner Engineering: A Yogi's Guide to Joy =

2016 spiritual and self-help book by Sadhguru

- Book cover featuring Patanjali
- Author: Sadhguru
- Language: English
- Subject: Spirituality, Yoga
- Genre: Non-Fiction, Self-Help
- Publisher: Penguin Books; Spiegel & Grau
- Publication date: September 20, 2016
- Publication place: India
- Media type: Paperback
- Pages: 271
- ISBN: 9780812997798
- OCLC: 936347280

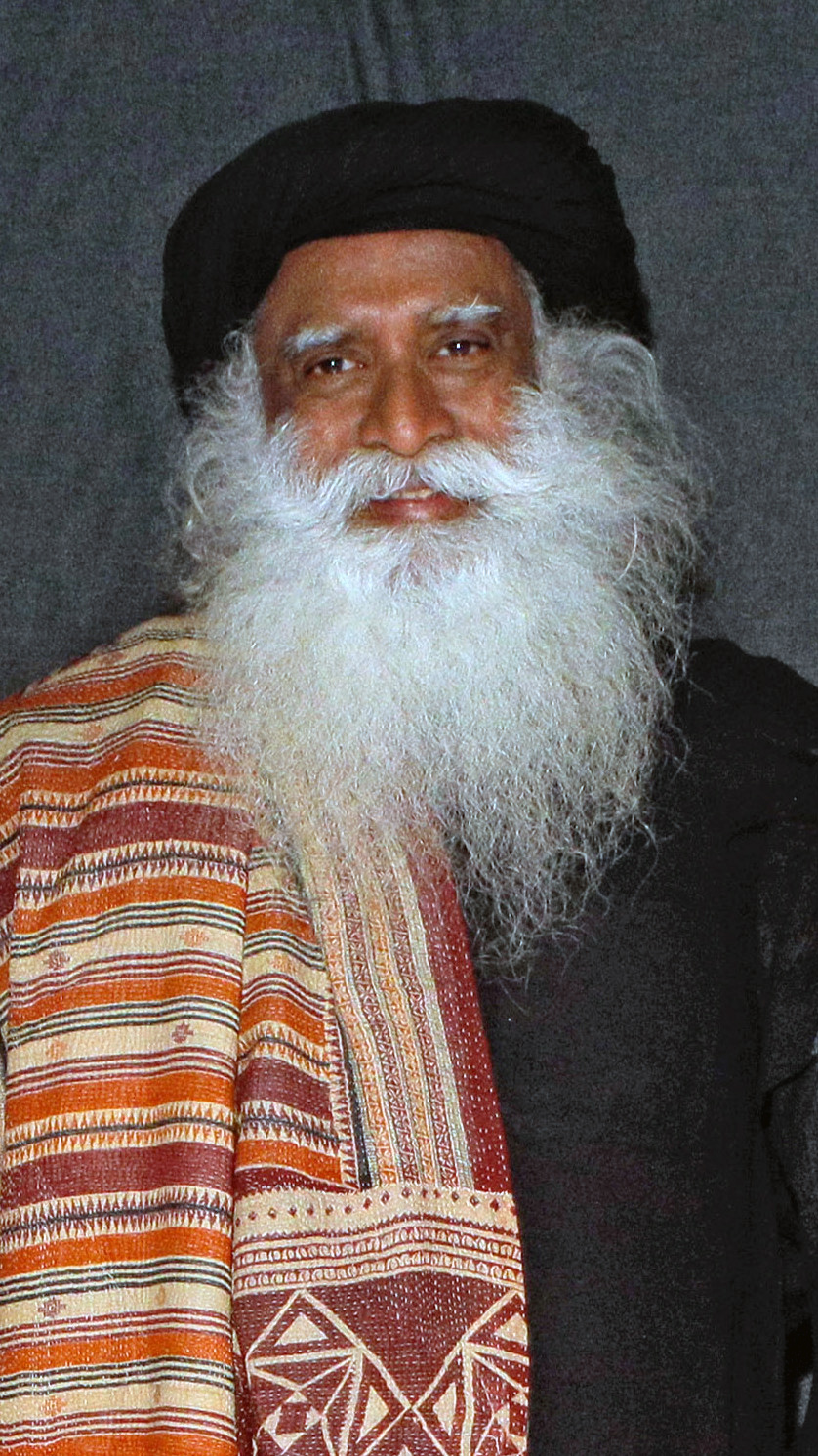
Sadhguru

Inner Engineering: A Yogi's Guide to Joy is a 2016 book written by Indian yogi and mystic Sadhguru. The book was featured among The New York Times Best Seller in the spirituality and self help category for November 2016. The book is intended to be a spiritual guide with practices for personal growth, and also a look at the author's own spiritual journey.

== Structure ==
The book is divided into two sections. Part One contains five chapters: When I Lost My Sense; The Way Out Is In; Design Your Destiny; No Boundary, No Burden; ...And Now, Yoga. Part Two has four chapters: Body; Mind; Energy; Joy.

The first chapter in Part One sets the scene with a brief autobiographical account of Sadhguru's life, the primary focus of which is to recount the spiritual experiences of the writer which later paved the path of his life; hence aptly titled When I Lost my Sense. The second chapter, The Way Out is in, talks about the need for a paradigm shift in the seeking of joy, which Sadhguru believes is the ultimate goal of all human beings. He prescribes looking within at the source of experience to seek joy as opposed to trying to find it in the outside surroundings. Similarly, he advises not to find a way out of suffering, but rather find it inwards. In the third chapter, Design your Destiny, Sadhguru gives a guarantee to the reader: do the right things and right things will for sure happen to you. Taking action in your hands is the key to designing your own destiny. The fourth chapter, No Boundary No Burden, is about the nature of the word responsibility in the context of Inner Engineering philosophy, and cultivating the ability to be responsible/responsive in life. Responsibility is defined as the ability to respond to everything that is in human experience and it is advised that humans understand their capacity to be limitlessly 'responsible' by shedding the burden of enslaving themselves with boundaries. The last chapter of part one, "...And Now Yoga", elaborates upon the true nature of yoga, the concept of the five koshas, the types of yoga, and finally the idea of finding the perfect alignment with existence.

Part 2 of the book explores the concept of layers or sheaths in a human being's identity. There are three individual sections in this part, titled Body, Mind, and Energy which deal with the first three of these layers. Each section is further divided into subsections, with each subsection ending with a Sadhna (practice) section which outlines short spiritual practices to incorporate the philosophical point discussed.

Part 2 ends with a brief section called Joy: The Beginning, which outlines the need of joy in human beings' lives and the aim of the author to bring joy within people's consciousness. The book ends with a glossary of terms and a brief introduction of Isha Yoga Foundation.

== Launch ==
Published on September 20, 2016, by Spiegel & Grau, the book was launched in the United States in New York's Times Square. The author's subsequent book and lecture tour covered 17 cities in North America, with a total audience of 26,000 people. Outside the United States, the book was launched on November 13 in London. In India, the book was launched in Mumbai on December 15 by filmmaker Subhash Ghai and also at the Jaipur Literature Festival and at the Kerala Literature Festival by actress Manju Warrier. In Dubai, the book was launched on March 17, at a talk by Sadhguru.

== Reception ==
After its United States launch, the book entered The New York Times Best Seller list in the health, religion, and self-help categories, and The Washington Post bestseller list in the non-fiction hardcover category. The book won the 2017 Crossword Book Award under the non-fiction category (popular choice awards).

A review in Deccan Chronicle said the book recast Patanjali's Yoga Sutra in layman's terms. The review further stated that the author neither takes a "moral high ground nor seeks to be prescriptive" but offers a "pragmatic approach".
