= Indira Gandhi Paryavaran Puraskar =

Indian environmental protection award

The Indira Gandhi Paryavaran Puraskar (Hindi: इंदिरा गांधी पर्यावरण पुरस्कार) is an environment award given for contributions in the field of environmental protection. The award was established in 1987 by the Ministry of Environment, Forests, and Climate Change, Government of India. A cash prize, silver lotus trophy, scroll, and a citation are included in the award. The selection of any organization or personality for the award is done by a committee headed by the Vice President of India. In 2008, the award was given to Isha Foundation of Tamil Nadu. This organization has a Guinness world record for planting more than eight lakh saplings in a single day.

== Nomination ==
The award is given every year and an advertisement for inviting nominations for IGPP is released every year on 15 July in national dailies with regional coverage. As per the amended regulations in 2010 governing the IGPP Indira Gandhi Paryavaran Puraskar, the following can propose a name of any such person or organization in India: any Indian citizen with at least 10 years of work experience in the field of environment, an NGO working in the field of environment with at least five years of experience, the Department of Environment and Forestry of States, Union Territories, State Pollution Control Board, District Collector, and Magistrate.

== List of awards ==
Previous IGPP Awards
Year	Awardee (Individual or Organization)	Location
1987	Bombay Natural History Society	Mumbai, Maharashtra
1988	Kerala Sastra Sahitya Parishad	Kerala
1989	Samaj Parivartana Samudaya	Dharwad, Karnataka
1990	Shri Sant Kumar Bishnoi	Punjab
1991	Shri S. P. Godrej	New Delhi
1991	Dasholi Gram Swarajya Mandal	Garhwal, Uttarakhand
1992	Dr. Shivarama Karanth K.	Dakshin Kannada, Karnataka
1992	127-Infantry Battalion (T.A.) Ecological	Dehradun, Uttarakhand
1993	Dr. T. N. Khoshoo	New Delhi
1993	Young Mizo Association	Mizoram
1994	Smt. Radha Bhatt, Kasturba Gandhi National Memorial Trust	Indore, Madhya Pradesh
1994	Tarun Bharat Sangh	Alwar, Rajasthan
1995	Shri Natwar Thakkar, Nagaland Gandhi Ashram	Mokokchung, Nagaland
1995	Mechanised Infantry Regimental Centre	Ahmednagar, Maharashtra
1996	Shri Anupam Mishra, Gandhi Peace Foundation	New Delhi
1996	C.P.R. Environmental Education Centre	Chennai, Tamil Nadu
1997	Shri J. C. Daniel	Mumbai, Maharashtra
1997	Centre for Environment Education	Ahmedabad, Gujarat
1998	Shri Jagdish Ranganath Godbole	Pune, Maharashtra
1998	The Barefoot College of Social Work Research Centre	Ajmer, Rajasthan
1999	Shri Piare Lal	Jallandhar, Punjab
1999	Ryan Foundation	Mumbai, Maharashtra
2000	Dr. Ramesh Bedi (Posthumously)	Punjab
2000	Captive Power Plant, National Aluminium Co.Ltd.	Angul, Odisha
2001	Shri. Girish Gandhi	Maharashtra
2001	Tirumala Tirupati Devasthanams	Tirupati, Andhra Pradesh
2002	Rev. Fr. Koyapillil Mathai Matthew, SJ (Posthumously)	Kodaikannal, Tamil Nadu
2002	Chilika Development Authority	Odisha
2003	Dr. Bindeshwar Pathak	New Delhi
2003	The Garhwal Rifles Regimental Centre	Lansdowne, Uttarakhand
2004	Ms. Jyotsna Sitling	Uttarakhand
2004	Malayala Manorama	Kerala
2005	Sant Gadge Baba Amrawati University	Amrawati, Maharashtra
2005	Shri Jagadish Babla	Dehradun, Uttarakhand
2005	Dr. Amrita Patel	Anand, Gujarat
2006	Bongaigaon Refinery (IOCL)	Chirang, Assam
2006	127-Infantry Battalion (T.A.) Ecological	Pithoragarh, Uttarakhand
2006	Dr. J. Raghava Rao	Chennai, Tamil Nadu
2006	Smt. S. Annapurna	Vizianagaram, Andhra Pradesh
2007	BAIF Institute for Rural Development	Tiptur, Karnataka
2007	Antoday Nirbal Durbal Shoshit Mahila Evam Bal Uthaan Kalyan Samiti	Lucknow, Uttar Pradesh
2007	Shri. Afzal Khatri & Smt. Nusrat Khatri	Mumbai, Maharashtra
2007	Dr. Rachna Gaur	Rajsamand, Rajasthan
2008	ISHA Foundation	Coimbatore, Tamil Nadu
2009	Neyveli Lignite Corporation Limited	Neyveli, Tamil Nadu
2009	Care Earth	Chennai, Tamil Nadu
2009	Prof. C. R. Babu	New Delhi
2009	Shri Vijay Jardhari	Jardhargaon, Uttarakhand
2010	21st Battalion, the Jat Regiment	Assam
2010	Joygopalpur Gram Vikas Kendra	24 Parganas (South), West Bengal
2010	Dr. Anil Sharma	Sirmour, Himachal Pradesh
2010	Shri Kartick Satyanarayanan	New Delhi
2010	Dr. N. Ramesh	Puducherry
2011	Indian Farmers Fertiliser Cooperative Ltd. (IFFCO)	Uttar Pradesh
2011	128 Infantry Battalion (TA) Ecological Rajputana Rifles	Rajasthan
2011	Shri Ramesh Sharma	Chhattisgarh
2011	Shri Sharda Prasad Singh	Uttar Pradesh
2011	Sachidanand Bharti	Uttarakhand
2012	Aaranyak	Assam
2012	Durgapur Steel Plant	West Bengal
2012	Shri Biswajit Mukherjee	West Bengal
2012	Shri Jigmet Takpa	Jammu & Kashmir
2012	Smt. Seema S. Redkar	Maharashtra

== See also ==
- List of environmental awards
- Indira Priyadarshini Vrikshamitra Awards
