= Aaranyak =

Indian non-governmental organisation

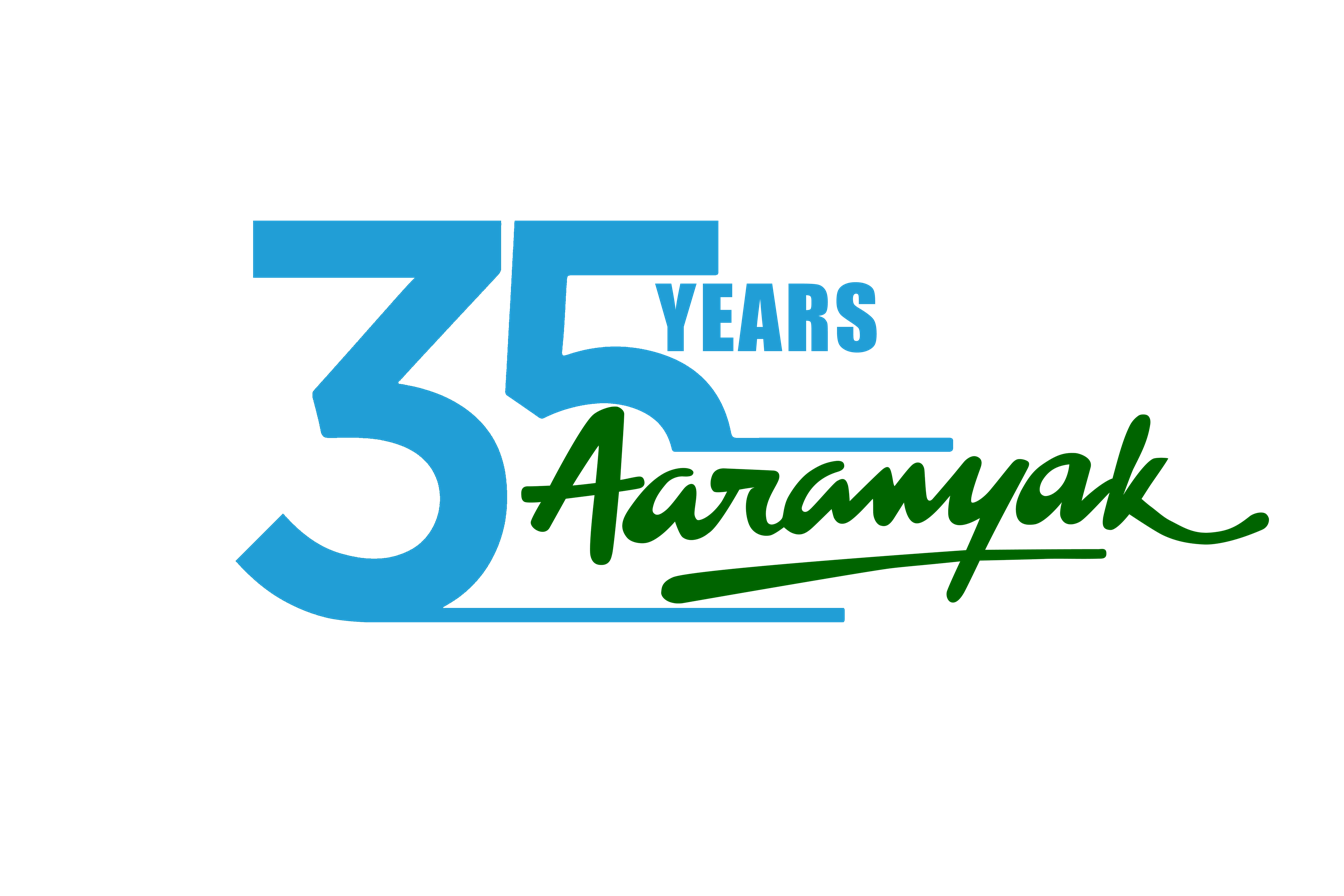
- Founded: 1989
- Founder: Bibhab Kumar Talukdar
- Type: Charitable Trust
- Purpose: Environmentalism, Conservation, Ecology
- Headquarters: Guwahati, India
- Location: Northeast India
- Region served: Eastern Himalayas
- Method: Education, lobbying, research, consultancy
- Executive Director: Dr. Bibhab Kumar Talukdar
- Key people: Dr. Bibhab Kumar Talukdar, Dr. Bibhuti Prasad Lahkar, Dr. Purnima Devi Barman, Dr. Partha Jyoti Das, Dr. M. Firoz Ahmed, Dr. Dilip Chetry, Mr. Jimut Prasad Sarma, Dr. Abdul Wakid, Mr. Udayan Borthakur, Dr. Parag Jyoti Deka
- Website: www.aaranyak.org

Aaranyak is a leading environmental conservation NGO based in Guwahati. It was founded by Bibhab Kumar Talukdar. It is a Scientific, Industrial Research and frontline environmental organization of India. It works all over the eastern Himalayan region on nature conservation, natural resources management, climate change, disaster management and livelihood enhancement of marginalized communities through research, education and advocacy.

The group says its mission is to foster conservation of biodiversity in Northeast India through research, environmental education, capacity building and advocacy for legal and policy reform to usher a new era of ecological security.

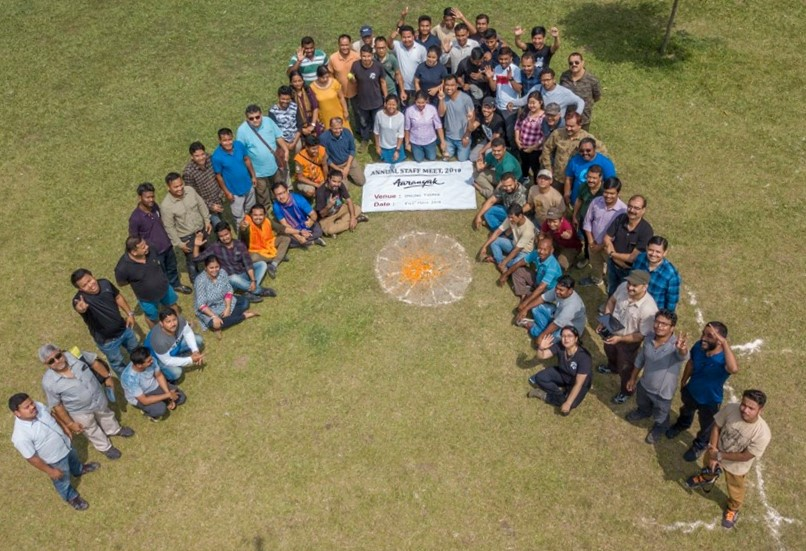
A drone-captured group photograph from an Aaranyak staff meet in its early years

== History ==
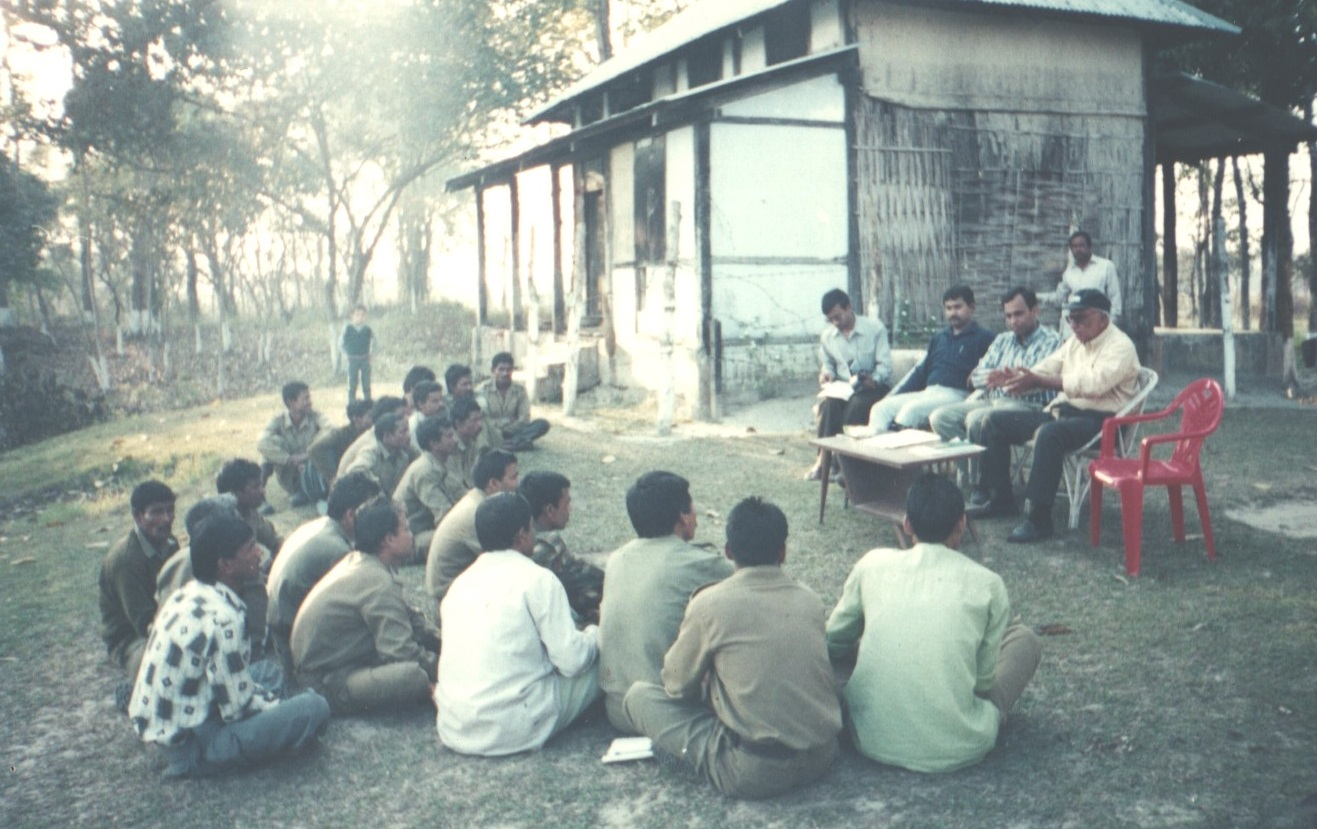
A decades-old photograph from an awareness event in Orang, led by Aaranyak's founder Dr. Bibhab Kumar Talukdar.

Aaranyak was founded on 9 September 1989 in Guwahati. Aaranyak has broadened its scope to include applied research, conservation action, environmental education, and capacity building for forest-dependent communities to promote sustainable livelihoods.

== Books from Aaranyak ==
Name of book	Language
Amphibians and Reptiles of Northeast India- A Photographic Guide	Assamese, English
Indian Rhinos in Protected Areas of Assam	English
Role of Policy and Institutions in Local Adaptation to Climate Change	English
