= List of forest research institutes =

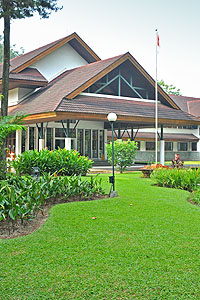
CIFOR headquarters, Bogor

This is a list of forest research institutes around the world, by continent and country. It includes research institutions with a primary focus on forest science, forestry, forest management, and related fields.

== International ==
- Center for International Forestry Research (CIFOR), Bogor, Indonesia
- Center for Tropical Forest Science, Panama City, Panama
- European Forest Institute, Joensuu, Finland
- International Union of Forest Research Organizations (IUFRO) Vienna, Austria

== Africa ==
=== Algeria ===
- Institut national de recherche forestière (INRF) (in French)

=== Ethiopia ===
- Ethiopian Environment and Forest Research Institute

=== Ghana ===
- Forestry Research Institute of Ghana

=== Kenya ===
- Kenya Forestry Research Institute

=== Malawi ===
- Forestry Research Institute of Malawi

=== Nigeria ===
- Forestry Research Institute of Nigeria

=== South Africa ===
- Council for Scientific and Industrial Research
- Institute for Commercial Forestry Research
- Forestry and Agricultural Biotechnology Institute (FABI), University of Pretoria
- Forestry and Forest Products Research Center, Durban, "a joint venture between CSIR's Natural Resources and the Environment operating unit and the University of KwaZulu-Natal"
- Merensky

=== Uganda ===
- Institute of Tropical Forest Conservation

== Americas ==
=== Canada ===
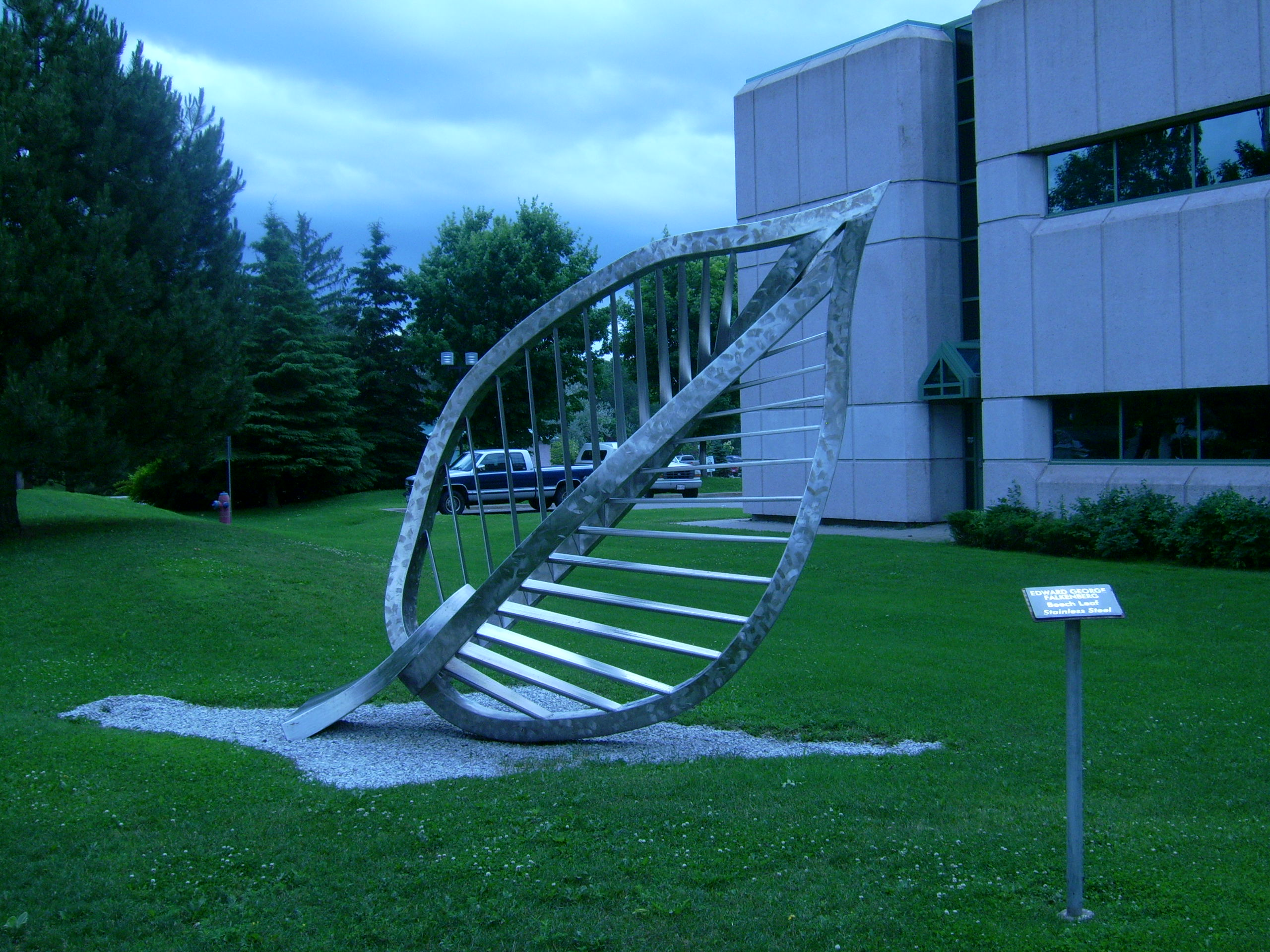
Ontario Forest Research Institute

- Atlantic Forestry Centre
- Canadian Wood Fibre Centre
- Centre for Forest Biology, Victoria, British Columbia
- Great Lakes Forestry Centre, Sault Ste. Marie, Ontario
- Laurentian Forestry Centre
- Northern Forestry Centre
- Ontario Forest Research Institute
- Pacific Forestry Centre
- FPInnovations

=== Chile ===
- Instituto Forestal, Ministry of Agriculture
- Instituto de Bosques y Sociedad, Austral University of Chile

=== Puerto Rico ===
- International Institute of Tropical Forestry

=== Suriname ===
- Centre for Agricultural Research in Suriname

=== United States ===
- Forest Products Laboratory
- Institute for Resource Information Systems
- Institute of Forest Resources, University of Washington, Seattle, Washington (created by Washington State Legislature, 1947)
- International Institute of Tropical Forestry
- Northern Research Station
- Oregon Forest Resources Institute
- Pacific Northwest Research Station
- Pacific Southwest Research Station
- Rocky Mountain Research Station
- Southern Research Station
- USDA Forest Service, Research and Development Branch

== Asia ==
=== Nepal ===
- Forest Research and Training Centre (formerly Department of Forest Research and Survey)

=== Bangladesh ===
- Bangladesh Forest Research Institute (formerly Forest Products Research Laboratory)

=== India ===
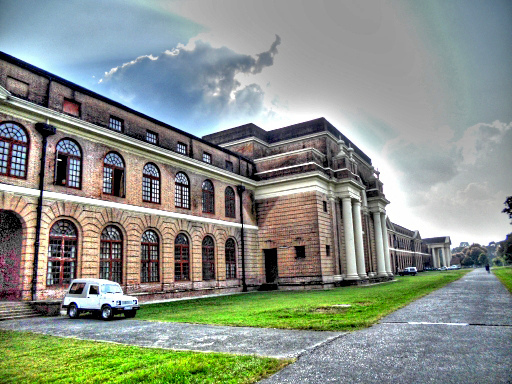
Forest Research Institute, Dehadrun

- Advanced Research Centre for Bamboo and Rattan, Aizawl
- Arid Forest Research Institute, Jodhpur
- Centre for Forest Based Livelihood and Extension, Agarlata
- Centre for Forestry Research and Human Resource Development, Chhindwara
- Centre for Social Forestry and Eco-Rehabilitation, Prayagraj
- Forest College and Research Institute, Tamil Nadu Agricultural University, Mettupalayam
- Forest Research Institute, Dehradun
- Forest Research Institute, Kanpur, Uttar Pradesh Forest Department
- Gujarat Forest Research Institute
- Himalayan Forest Research Institute, Shimla
- Institute of Forest Biodiversity, Hyderabad
- Institute of Forest Genetics and Tree Breeding, Coimbatore
- Institute of Forest Productivity, Ranchi
- Institute of Wood Science and Technology, Bengaluru
- Kerala Forest Research Institute, Peechi, Thrissur
- Rain Forest Research Institute, Jorhat
- Tropical Forest Research Institute, Jabalpur
- Van Vigyan Kendra (Forest Science Centres)
- State Forest Research Institute, Chennai

=== Japan ===
- Yamanashi Forest Research Institute

=== Korea ===
- National Institute of Forest Science
- Tree-Ring Research Center, Chungbuk National University

=== Lao P.D.R. ===
- National Agriculture and Forestry Research Institute

=== Malaysia ===
- Forest Research Institute Malaysia
- Malaysia Palm Oil Board

=== Myanmar (Burma) ===
- Forest Research Institute, affiliated with the University of Forestry (Yezin)

=== Pakistan ===
- Pakistan Forest Institute, Peshawar

=== Taiwan ===
- Taiwan Forestry Research Institute

=== Tajikistan ===
- Tajik State Forest Research Institute, Dushanbe, affiliated with the Forestry Agency under the Government of Tajikistan

=== Thailand ===
- Forest Restoration Research Unit, Chiang Mai

=== Vietnam ===
- Forestry Science Institute of Vietnam

== Europe ==
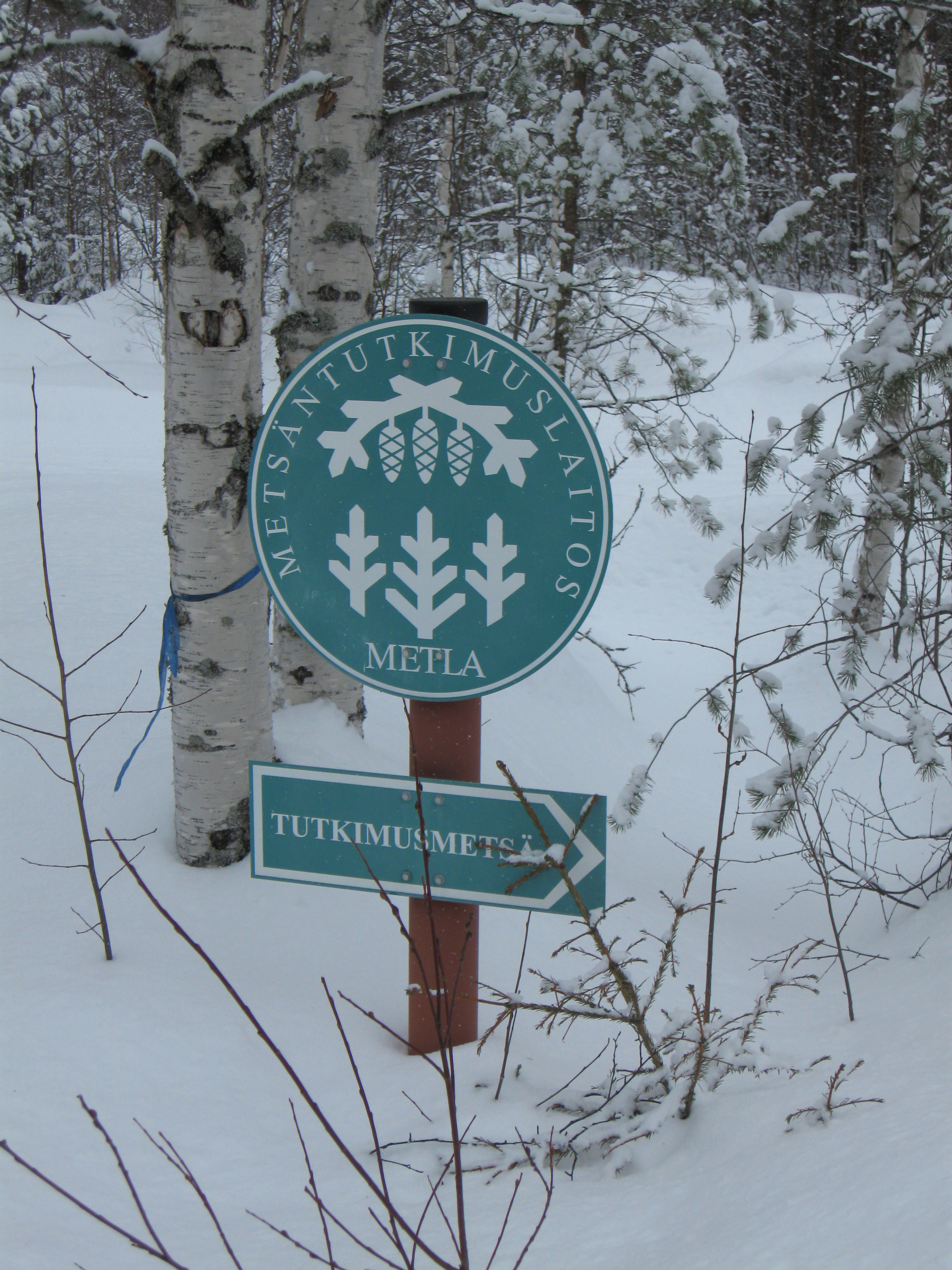
Metla research forest

=== Austria ===
- Federal Forest Research Centre Vienna

=== Belgium ===
- Research Institute for Nature and Forest

=== France ===
- AgroParisTech Nancy

=== Finland ===
- Finnish Forest Research Institute (Metla)

=== Germany ===
- Bayerische Landesanstalt für Wald und Forstwirtschaft
- Forschungsanstalt für Waldökologie und Forstwirtschaft Rheinland-Pfalz
- Forstliche Versuchs- und Forschungsanstalt Baden-Württemberg
- Landesbetrieb Wald und Holz NRW - Lehr- und Versuchsforstamt Arnsberger Wald
- Landesforst Mecklenburg-Vorpommern - Forstliches Versuchswesen
- Landeskompetenzzentrum Forst Eberswalde (Brandenburg)
- Nordwestdeutsche Forstliche Versuchsanstalt (Niedersachsen, Hessen, Sachsen-Anhalt, Schleswig-Holstein)
- Sachsenforst - Kompetenzzentrum Wald und Forstwirtschaft
- Thünen-Institut - Institut für Waldökosysteme
- Thüringenforst - Forstliches Forschungs- und Kompetenzzentrum Gotha

=== Greece ===
- Forest Research Institute of Thessaloniki

=== Hungary ===
- Hungarian Forest Research Institute

=== Latvia ===
- Latvian State Forest Research Institute "Silava"

=== Norway ===
- Norwegian Forest Research Institute
- Norwegian Institute of Bioeconomy Research

=== Russia ===
- Forestry Engineering Academy, Saint Petersburg
- Saint Petersburg Forestry Research Institute, since 1929, Saint Petersburg
- Sukachev Institute of Forest, Russian Academy of Sciences, Moscow

=== Belarus ===
- Forest Research Instite, National Academy of Sciences of Belarus, Homel

=== Spain ===
- Forest Sciences Centre of Catalonia (CTFC)
- Forest Research Centre (INIA-CIFOR)

=== Sweden ===
- Forestry Research Institute of Sweden (Skogforsk)

=== Switzerland ===
- Swiss Federal Institute for Forest, Snow and Landscape Research (WSL)

=== United Kingdom ===
- Forest Research (agency), Forestry Commission
  - Aberystwyth Research Unit
  - Alice Holt Research Station
  - Northern Research Station

== Oceania ==
=== Australia ===
- Commonwealth Scientific and Industrial Research Organisation (CSIRO)

=== New Zealand ===
- Scion (Crown Research Institute)

== See also ==
- List of environmental research institutes
- List of forestry universities and colleges
- Food and Agriculture Organization (FAO), Rome
- International Forestry Resources and Institutions (IFRI) network, Michigan, US
- International Union of Forest Research Organizations (IUFRO), Vienna
- World Agroforestry Centre, Nairobi, Kenya
- World Forestry Congress
