= List of forest research institutes in India =

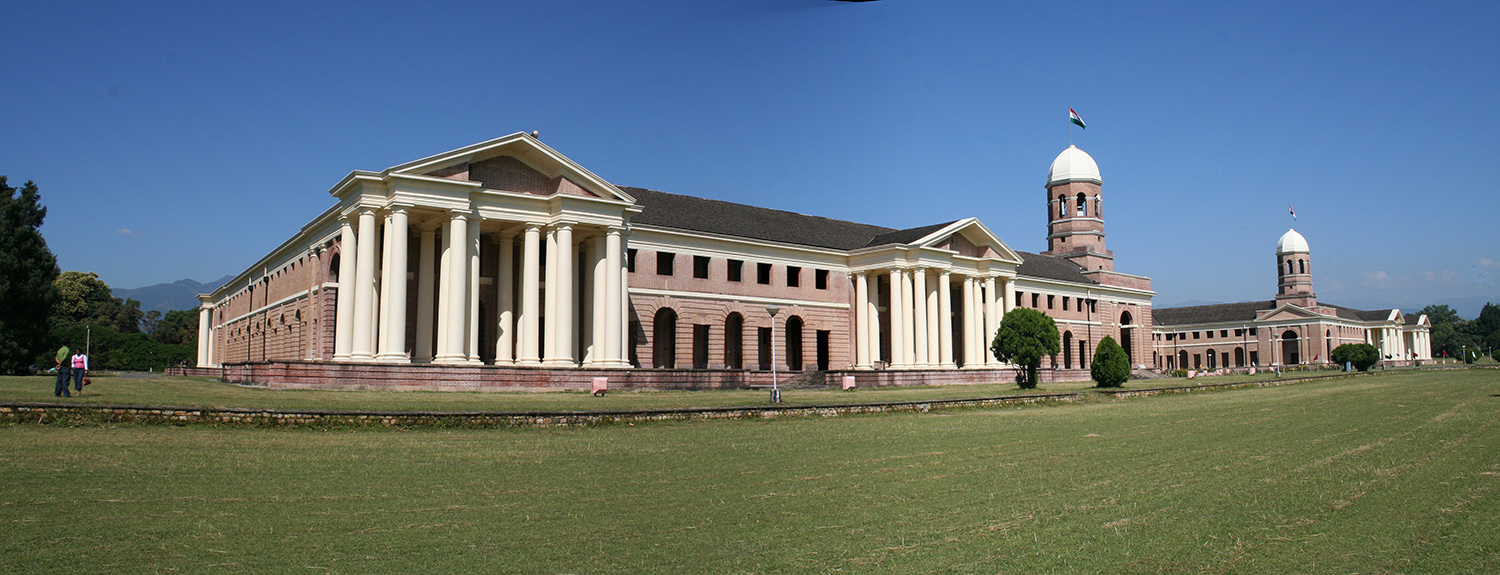
Forest Research Institute, Dehradun

This is a List of forest research institutes in India.

== Autonomous research institutes ==
=== Ministry of Environment and Forests ===
Institutes under India's Ministry of Environment, Forest and Climate Change

- Govind Ballabh Pant Institute of Himalayan Environment & Development, Almora (GBPIHED)
- Indian Institute of Forest Management (IIFM), Bhopal
- Indian Plywood Industries Research and Training Institute (IPIRTI), Bengaluru
- Wildlife Institute of India (WII), Dehradun

=== Indian Council of Forestry Research and Education ===
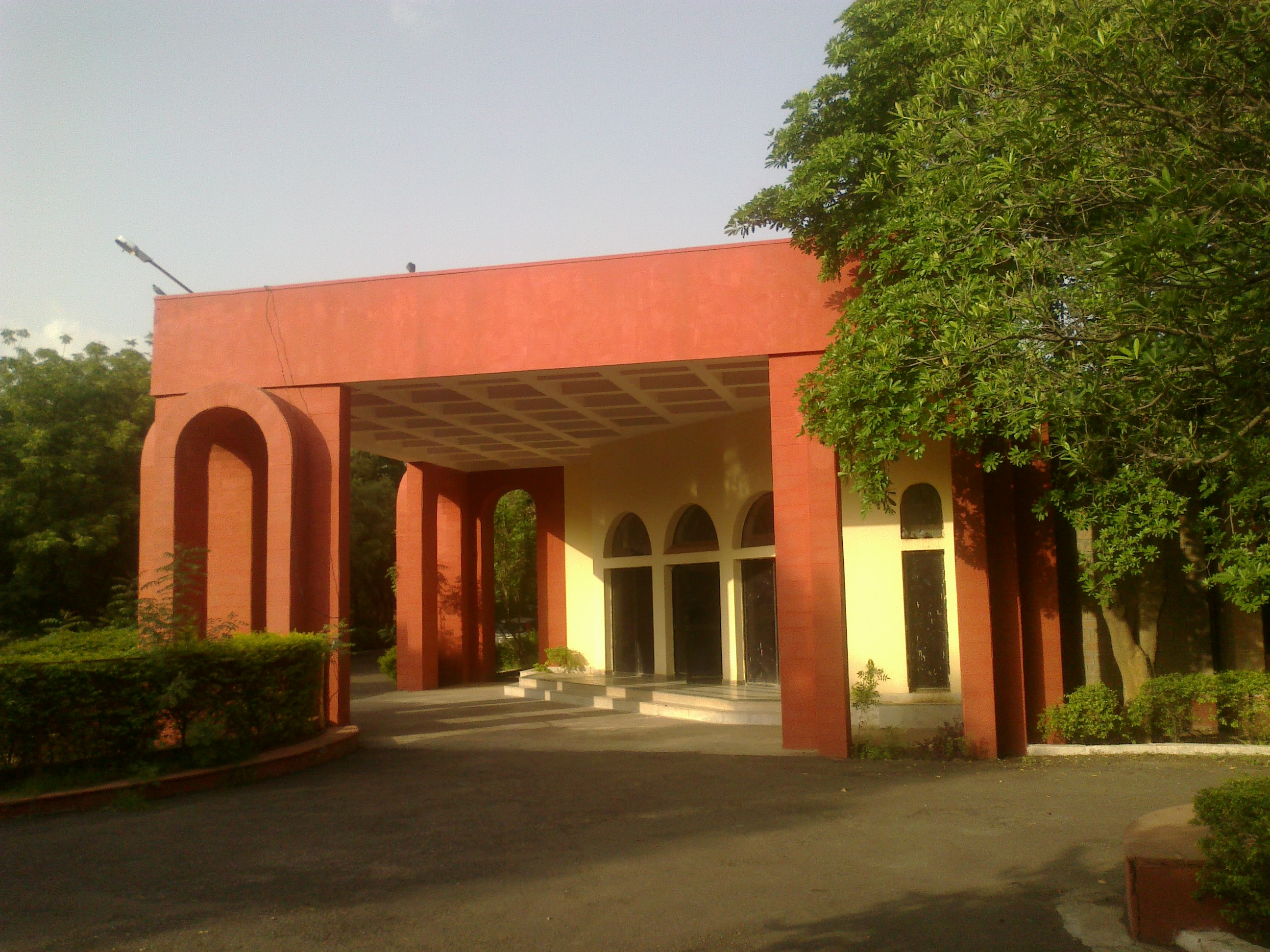
Arid Forest Research Institute, Jodhpur

Institutes under the Indian Council of Forestry Research and Education Headquartered in Dehradun

- Advanced Research Centre for Bamboo and Rattan, Aizawl
- Arid Forest Research Institute, Jodhpur
- Centre for Forest Based Livelihood and Extension (CFLE), Agartala
- Centre for Forestry Research and Human Resource Development, Chhindwara
- Centre for Social Forestry and Eco-Rehabilitation, Prayagraj
- Forest Research Institute (India), Dehradun
- Himalayan Forest Research Institute, Shimla
- Institute of Forest Biodiversity, Hyderabad
- Institute of Forest Genetics and Tree Breeding, Coimbatore
- Institute of Forest Productivity, Ranchi
- Institute of Wood Science and Technology, Bengaluru
- Rain Forest Research Institute, Jorhat
- Tropical Forest Research Institute, Jabalpur
- Van Vigyan Kendra (Forest Science Centres)

== Other national institutes ==
Other research institutes under the Ministry of Environment and Forestry

Subordinate offices

- Forest Survey of India, Dehradun
- Indira Gandhi National Forest Academy, Dehradun
- Directorate of Forest Education, Dehradun
- Botanical Survey of India, Kolkata
- National Institute of Animal Welfare, Faridabad
- National Zoological Park, New Delhi
- National Museum of Natural History, New Delhi
- Zoological Survey of India, Kolkata
- Wildlife Crime Control Bureau (WCCB)

Authorities

- Central Zoo Authority of India, New Delhi
- National Biodiversity Authority, Chennai
- National Ganga River Basin Authority, New Delhi
- National Tiger Conservation Authority, New Delhi

Centres of excellence

- Centre for Environment Education, Ahmedabad
- C.P.R. Environmental Education Center, Chennai
- Centre for Animals and Environment, Bengaluru
- Centre of Excellence in Environmental Economics, Chennai
- Foundation for Revitalisation of Local Health Traditions, Bengaluru
- Centre for Ecological Sciences, Bengaluru
- Centre for Environmental Management of Degraded Ecosystem, Delhi
- Centre for Mining Environment, Dhanbad
- Salim Ali Center for Ornithology and Natural History (SACON), Coimbatore
- Tropical Botanic Garden and Research Institute, Thiruvananthapuram

== Under state governments ==
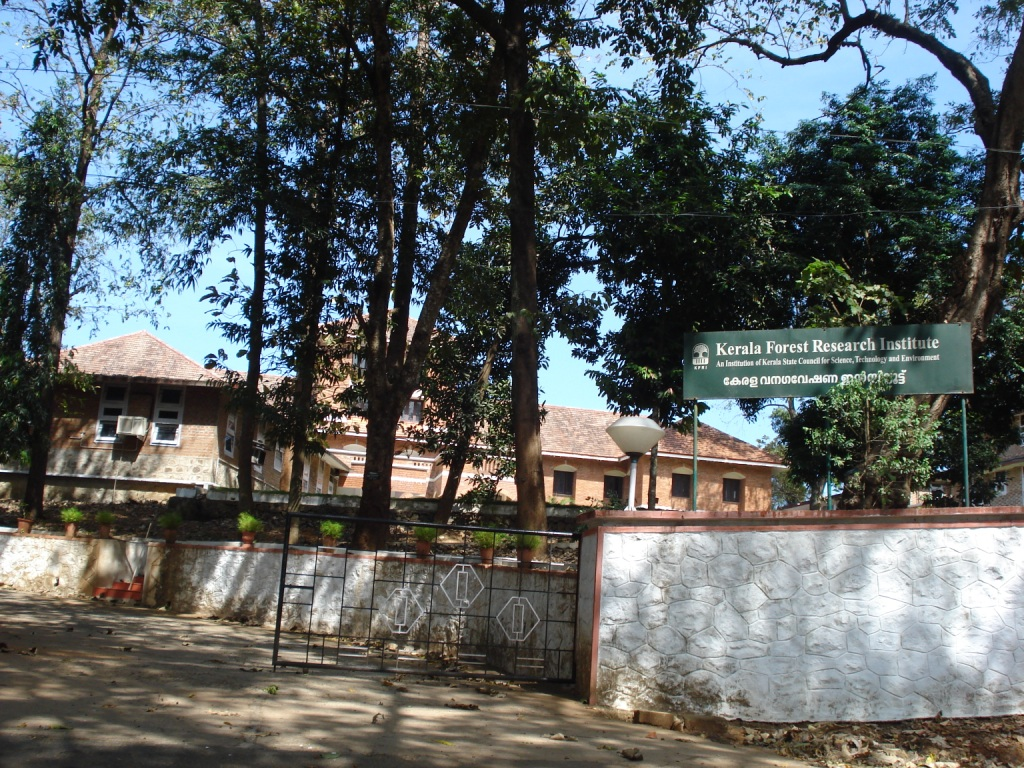
Kerala Forest Research Institute

- Kerala Forest Research Institute, Peechi, Thrissur (KSCSTE KFRI)
- Forest College and Research Institute, TNAU, Mettupalayam (TNAU- FCRI)
- Forest Research Institute, Kanpur, Uttar Pradesh Forest Department
- Gujarat Forest Research Centre, Rajpipla, Gujarat
- State Forest Department, Jammu
- State Forest Research and Training Institute, Raipur, Chhattisgarh
- State Forest Research Institute, Jabalpur, Madhya Pradesh
- State Forest Research Institute, Chennai, Tamil Nadu
- State Forest Research Institute, Ladhowal, District Ludhiana, Punjab
- State Forest Research Institute, Itanagar, Arunachal Pradesh
- Karnataka Forest Academy, Dharwad, Karnataka

== See also ==
- List of forest research institutes
- Ministry of Environment and Forests (India)
- Indian Council of Forestry Research and Education
- Indian Forest Service
