= Forest Research Institute =

Forest Research Institute may refer to:

== India ==
- Forest Research Institute (India)
- Arid Forest Research Institute
- Himalayan Forest Research Institute
- Kerala Forest Research Institute
- Rain Forest Research Institute
- Tropical Forest Research Institute

== Other countries ==
- Bangladesh Forest Research Institute
- Finnish Forest Research Institute
- Forest Research Institute Malaysia
- New Zealand Forest Research Institute
- Ontario Forest Research Institute, Canada
- Papua New Guinea Forest Research Institute
- Forest Research Institute of Thessaloniki, Greece

== See also ==
- List of forest research institutes
- List of forest research institutes in India
