= Forest research (disambiguation) =

Forest research refers to agencies, organizations and departments that carry out forestry research:

- International Union of Forest Research Organizations with 700 member organizations
- Finnish Forest Research Institute
- Indian Council of Forestry Research and Education
  - Forest Research Institute (India), Dehradun, India
- Forest Research Institute Malaysia
- Forest Research, UK government agency

Also:

- International Forestry Resources and Institutions, an international network linked to Indiana University, US
- List of forest research institutes
