= Indian Institute of Forest Management =

College in Madhya Pradesh

- भारतीय वन प्रबंधन संस्थान
- Type: Natural Resources Service Training Institute
- Established: 1982; 44 years ago
- Affiliations: Ministry of Environment, Forest and Climate Change, Government of India
- Budget: ₹10.30 crore (US$1.1 million) (2025–26)
- Director: Dr. K. Ravichandran, IFS
- Students: >385
- Postgraduates: >385
- Location: Bhopal, Madhya Pradesh, India; 23.2084°N 77.3844°E
- Campus: 217 acres (0.88 km^{2})
- Website: Official Website IIFM Alumni Website

The Indian Institute of Forest Management (IIFM), founded 1982, is an autonomous, Natural Resource Service training institute of Forestry located in Bhopal, Madhya Pradesh, India, established by the MoEFCC, Government of India with financial assistance from the SIDA and course assistance from the IIM Ahmedabad for mid career training of IFS cadre and all State Forest Service cadre in India. The institute's objective is to fulfill the growing need for the managerial human resource in the area of Forest, Environment, and Natural resources Management and allied sectors. The institute is headed by a director selected and appointed by the Ministry of Environment, Forest and Climate Change, Government of India.

IIFM is engaged in education, research, training and consultancy in the area of Forest, Environment and Natural Resources Management and allied sectors. The institute was ranked 8th overall in the country by the MHRD, GoI in the management institutions category under the NIRF in its India Rankings 2016. As a campus, IIFM is famous for its rich flora and fauna with sightings of various wild mammals and birds within the campus.

== Campus ==
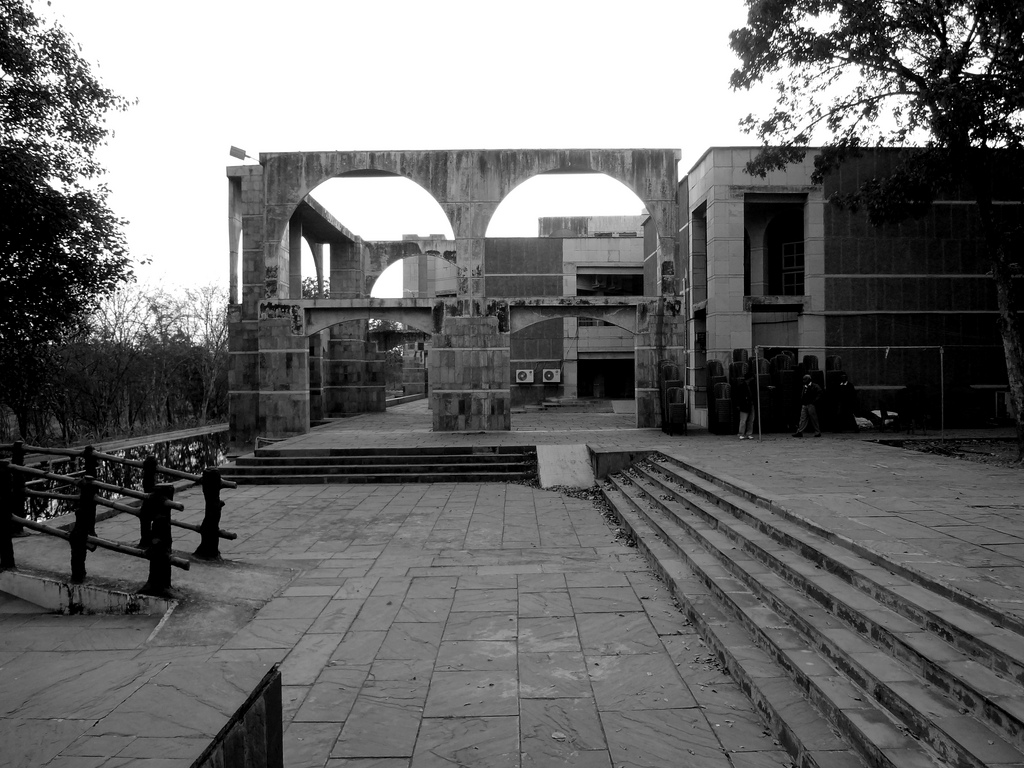
IIFM Bhopal

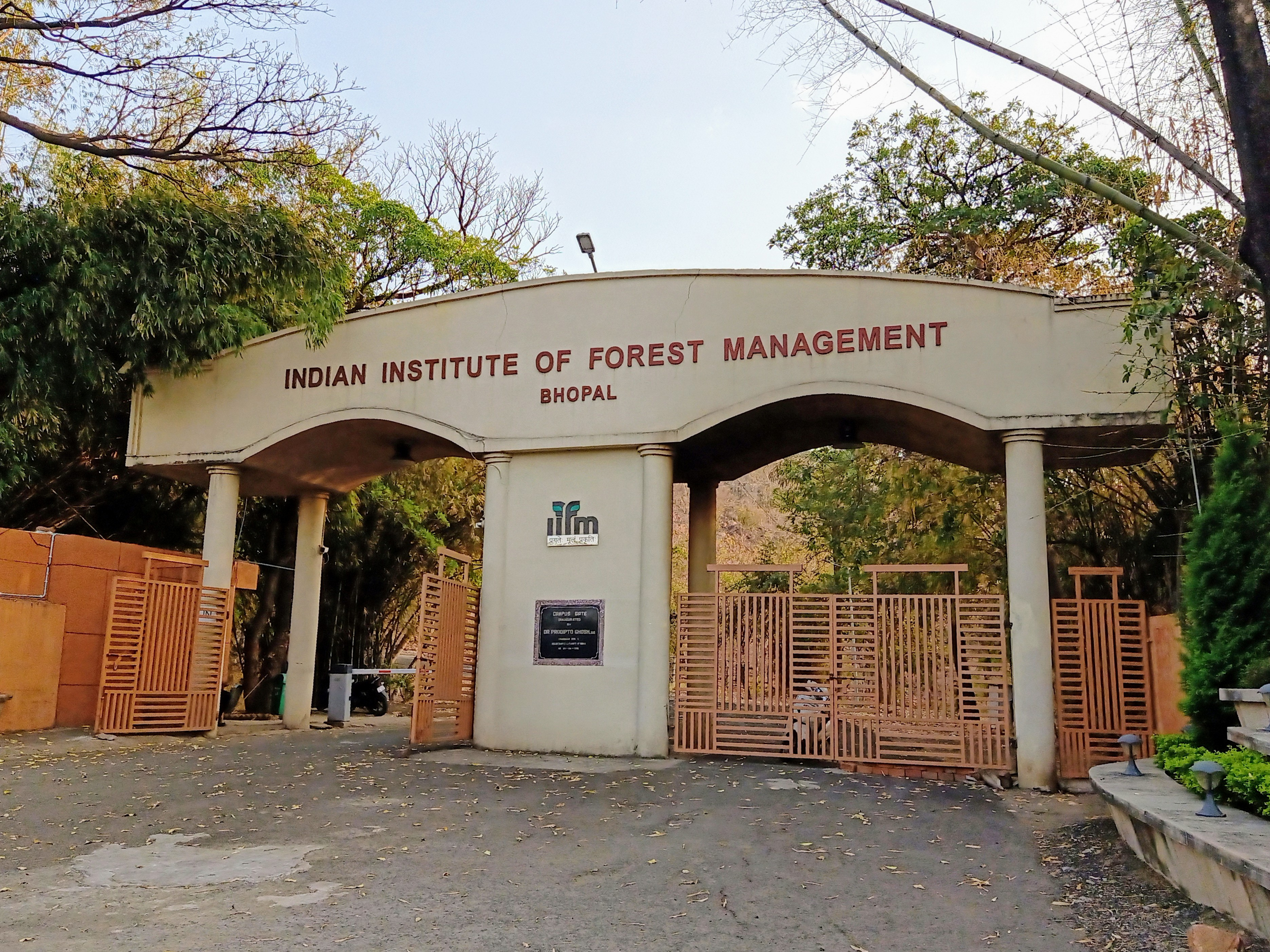
IIFM, Bhopal entrance gate

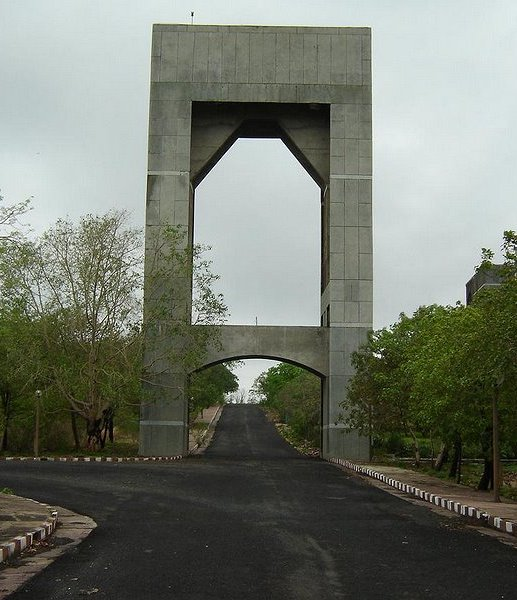
IIFM 'Arc'

The institute is located in the southwestern corner of the city of Bhopal in the Nehru Nagar locality. It is on a hill that overlooks the Bhadbhada barrage. The barrage controls the overflow of the upper lake or Bada Talab of Bhopal. The spillway for Bhadbhada tails around the IIFM hill, giving it a scenic location surrounded by water on three sides like a peninsula during good monsoons. The location is 3.5 km south of T.T. Nagar and just off the road to Kerwa Dam.

The institute's buildings are designed by Anant Raje. The architecture of the campus is inspired by the historical town of Mandu.

== Academics ==
=== Academic programmes ===
IIFM conducts following courses:

1. MBA in Forestry Management (MBA-FM)
2. MBA in Sustainability Management (MBA-SM)
3. MBA in Sustainability Development (MBA-SD)
4. MBA in Development and Sustainability Finance (MBA-DSF)
5. Fellow Program in Management (FPM) equivalent to Ph.D.,
6. Ph.D. Programme of FRI Deemed University
7. Certificate Course on Chartered Foresters (C3F)

The MBA-FM (earlier PGDFM / PFM) course is the flagship course of IIFM and is one of its kind in Asia.

In addition to the above courses, it conducts Management Development programmes.

==== Masters of Business Administration in Forestry Management (MBA-FM) ====
The MBA-FM (earlier PGDFM / PFM) course was started in 1988. It is a two-year residential course. The first batch of MBA-FM students graduated in 1990.

IIFM uses the scores of Common Admission Test (CAT) conducted by Indian Institutes of Management and the Xavier Aptitude Test (XAT) conducted by the XLRI to shortlist the candidates for the Written Aptitude Test and the Personal Interview. The shortlisted candidates are required to submit a Statement of Purpose (SOP) on why they want to pursue the MBA course at IIFM. After conducting the Written Aptitude Test and the Personal Interview the institute announces the final list of candidates provisionally selected for the course.

=== Placement ===
Most of the job placements at IIFM are with the environment, consulting, development sector and with NGOs, though recently a number of banks and microfinance institutions have participated in campus placements. Apart from it corporate also participate in IIFM placements and profiles are offered in sales and marketing, market research, banking and finance, environment, health and safety, environment management system, operations etc.

IIFM and its alumni work closely with national and international civil society, governments, academia and industry.

== See also ==
- Arid Forest Research Institute (AFRI)
- Indian Forest Service (IFS)
- Wildlife Institute of India (WII)
- List of Environment and Forest Research Institutes in India
- Forest Research Institute (India)
- Forest Survey of India
- Van Vigyan Kendra (VVK) Forest Science Centres
