= Indira Priyadarshini Vrikshamitra Awards =

Indira Priyadarshini Vriksha Mitra Awards
- Description: Pioneering work in afforestation and wasteland development
- Country: India
- Presented by: Ministry of Environment, Forest and Climate Change
- Reward: ₹250,000 (Rupees Two lakh fifty thousand)

Indira Priyadarshini Vriksha Mitra Awards or IPVM Awards are given by Ministry of Environment and Forests of Government of India to individuals and institutions who have done pioneering and exemplary work in the field of afforestation and wasteland development. A cash award of Rupees Two lakh fifty thousand is presented to individuals/institutions in seven categories. It was instituted in 1986 and were given annually. Initially, IPVM awards were given in twelve categories till 2006. But as per 2012 notification of Ministry of Environment and Forests Seven Categories are approved for IPVM Awards.

== Criteria ==
As per the Press Information Bureau of Government of India the activities deciding the awards are establishing decentralized nurseries; tree planting on wastelands/farm land; awareness- raising, motivations and extension work; involving the rural poor/ tribal / cooperatives in Afforestation and tree planting; setting up grass-roots level institutions like the Tree Growers’ Cooperative; and social fencing of community woodlots and pasture lands.

== Categories ==
1. Individual-Forest Officers
2. Individual-Other than Forest Officers
3. Institutions/Organisations under Government
4. Joint Forest Management Committees ( six awards region-wise)
5. Non-profit making Voluntary Organisations (NGOs)
6. Corporate Sector (Private/Public Sector Agencies)
7. Eco-Clubs at School Level (covered under National Green Corps Programme of the Ministry of Environment and Forests)

== Recipients ==
GAURA DEVI (1925 - 1991) is the first recipient of Indira Priyadarshini Vriksha Mitra (IPVM) Award in 1986.

Year	Name of Institution or Individual	Category	State
1986	Gaura Devi	Activist	Uttar Pradesh
1987	Shri Rakesh Kala	Individual including government servant	Uttar Pradesh
1991	Shri Om Prakash Agrawal	Individual	Chhattisgarh
2000	Shri Rongura Hrahsel	Individual Forest Officer	Mizoram
2003	Smt Kollakal Devakiyamma	Individual including Government Servant	Keralam
2006	Shri U. Veerakumar	Individual including government servant	Tamil Nadu
2006	Social Forestry Division, Junagarh	Institutions / Organization under Government	Odisha
2006	woman self-help groups within Binodpur Baikunthapur forests protection committee under Raidighi range of 24-Parganas(south ) Division	Joint Forest Management Committee	West Bengal
2006	The Jalgrahan Institution, Sattu, located in village panchayat Bhojato ka Oda, Dungarpur	Non Government Institution/ Organisation	Rajasthan
2007	B.B Limbasiya	Individual including Government Servant	Gujarat
2007	Department of Forests and Department of Education, Government of Kerala	Institution / Organization under Government	Kerala
2007	The village Forests Protection and Management Committee, Paliakhera	Joint Forests Management Committee	Rajasthan
2007	Nisarg Seva Samiti, Wardha	Non Government Institution /Organization	Rajasthan
2008	P. Sivakumar	Individual including Government Servant	Assam
2008	Range Forests Office, Taluka Sewa Sadan, Khambat	Institution / Organization under Government	Gujarat
2008	The van Suraksha Evam Prabandh Samiti, Gram Karel, The Jadol, Udaipur	Joint Forests Management Committee	Rajasthan
2008	Women’s Mandua, Women’s organisation for Socio-cultural Awareness(WOSCA), Keonjhar	Non Government organization	Odisha

== See also ==
- Indian Council of Forestry Research and Education
- Van Vigyan Kendra (VVK) Forest Science Centres
- List of environmental awards
