= Forest Survey of India =

Government of India organisation

- Logo of FSI
- Abbreviation: FSI
- Predecessor: Preinvestment Survey of Forest Resources (PISFR) established in 1965
- Formation: 1 June 1981; 45 years ago
- Headquarters: Dehradun, Uttarakhand, India
- Region served: India
- Director General: Santosh Tiwari, IFS
- Parent organisation: Ministry of Environment, Forest and Climate Change, Government of India
- Website: fsi.nic.in

Forest Survey of India (FSI), founded in June 1981 and headquartered at Dehradun in Uttarakhand, is the Government of India Ministry of Environment, Forest and Climate Change organisation which conducts forest surveys, studies and researches to periodically monitor the changing situations of land and forest resources and present the data for national planning, conservation and sustainable management of environmental protection as well as for the implementation of social forestry projects.

== History ==
Founded in 1981, Forest Survey of India is the successor of "Preinvestment Survey of Forest Resources" (PISFR), a project initiated in 1965 by the government of India with the sponsorship of Food and Agriculture Organization (FAO) and United Nations Development Programme (UNDP). In its report in 1976, the National Commission on Agriculture (NCA) recommended the creation of a National Forest Survey Organization for a regular, periodic and comprehensive forest resources survey of the country, leading to the creation of FSI in the same year.

== Organization ==
FSI assesses forest cover of the country every 2 years by digital interpretation of remote sensing satellite data and publishes the results in a biennial report called 'State of Forest Report' (SFR). Beginning in 1987, 16 SFRs have come so far. Since 2004, FSI has been monitoring forest fires across the country using MODIS (Moderate-Resolution Imaging Spectrometer) and GIS based technology.

== Training ==
FSI provides training to the foresters cadres of various states of India.

== Publications ==
FSI has biennial "The Indian State of Forest Reports" and area-specific reports on "The Reports on Inventory and Wood Consumption Studies".

== See also ==
- Forest Research Institute (India) (FRI)
- Indian Council of Forestry Research and Education (ICFRE)
- Indira Gandhi National Forest Academy (IGNFA)
- Indian Forest Service (IFS)
- Botanical Survey of India (BSI)
- Indian Institute of Forest Management (IIFM)
- Arid Forest Research Institute (AFRI)
- Van Vigyan Kendra (VVK) Forest Science Centres
- Wildlife Institute of India (WII)
