= Wildlife Institute of India =

Indian government institute

Agency overview
- Formed: 1982
- Parent department: Ministry of Environment, Forest and Climate Change, Government of India
- Website: https://www.wii.gov.in/

The Wildlife Institute of India (WII) is a research institution established in 1982 under the Ministry of Environment Forest and Climate change of Government of India. It is engaged in wildlife research in areas of study like biodiversity, endangered species, wildlife policy and management, wildlife forensics, ecology, ecotoxicology, and climate change. It also aids in conducting wildlife census. It has a 180 acres (73 ha) facility in Chandrabani in Dehradun district of Uttarakhand.

== Directors ==
The WII is headed by a director.

- V. B. Saharia (1982-1985)
- Hemendra Singh Panwar (1985 to 1994)
- Priya Ranjan Sinha (September 2004 to June 2013)
- Radha Krishna Goel (June 2013 to February 2014)
- Vinod Bihari Mathur (February 2014 to June 2019)
- Dhananjai Mohan (December 2019- 2022)
- Virendra R. Tiwari (2022 - 2025)
- Gobind Sagar Bhardwaj (2025 - Present)

== See also ==
- Arid Forest Research Institute
- Forest Research Institute (India)
- Indian Council of Forestry Research and Education
- Laboratory for the Conservation of Endangered Species
- List of Environment and Forest Research Institutes in India
- List of think tanks in India
- Van Vigyan Kendra
