= Institute of Forest Biodiversity =

Research institute in Hyderabad, Telangana, India

ICFRE-Institute of Forest Biodiversity (IFB)
- Type: Education and Research institute
- Established: 1997
- Parent institution: ICFRE
- Director: E. Venkat Reddy IFS
- Location: (India) SO Kompally, Dulapally, Hyderabad, Telangana, India 500100
- Campus: Urban
- Acronym: IFB
- Website: ifb.icfre.gov.in

ICFRE-Institute of Forest Biodiversity (IFB) is a research institute situated in Hyderabad in the state of Telangana, India. It works under the Indian Council of Forestry Research and Education (ICFRE) of the Ministry of Environment, Forest and Climate Change, Government of India.

== Divisions ==
- Ecology and Climate Change
- Genetics and Tree Improvement
- Extension and Publicity (ICTS)
- Mangroves and Coastal Ecology

== See also ==
- Indian Council of Forestry Research and Education
- Van Vigyan Kendra (VVK) Forest Science Centres
- Social forestry in India
