= Centre for Forest Based Livelihood and Extension =

Indian forest research institute

Coordinates: 23.888°N 91.284°E

Centre for Forest-based Livelihoods and Extension (CFLE) is an Advanced Research Centre situated in Agartala in Tripura. It works under the Indian Council of Forestry Research and Education (ICFRE) of the Ministry of Environment and Forests, Govt. of India.

== See also ==
- Indian Council of Forestry Research and Education
- List of Environment and Forest Research Institutes in India
- Van Vigyan Kendra (VVK) Forest Science Centres
