= TFRI =

TFRI may refer to:

- Taiwan Forestry Research Institute, a research institute in Taiwan
- Tropical Forest Research Institute, a research institute in India
