= Indian Council of Forestry Research and Education =

Autonomous governmental agency

- भारतीय वानिकी अनुसंधान एवं शिक्षा परिषद्
- Motto: वनस्पतय: शान्ति:
- Type: Autonomous Organisation
- Established: 1986; 40 years ago
- Parent institution: Ministry of Environment and Forests (India)
- Budget: ₹354.00 crore (US$37 million) (2025–26)
- Location: (India) P.O. New Forest, Dehradun, Uttarakhand, India 248006; 30.345192°N 78.002193°E
- Campus: Urban
- Acroonym: ICFRE (भा.वा.अ.शि.प.)
- Website: www.icfre.org

The Indian Council of Forestry Research and Education (ICFRE) is an autonomous organisation or governmental agency under the MoEFCC, Government of India. Headquartered in Dehradun, its functions are to conduct forestry research; transfer the technologies developed to the states of India and other user agencies; and to impart forestry education. The council has 9 research institutes and 4 advanced centres to cater to the research needs of different bio-geographical regions. These are located at Dehradun, Shimla, Ranchi, Jorhat, Jabalpur, Jodhpur, Bengaluru, Coimbatore, Prayagraj, Chhindwara, Aizawl, Hyderabad and Agartala. It's also the administrator and implementor of India's Green Credits Program.

== History ==
ICFRE is the largest organisation responsible for forestry research in India. ICFRE was created in 1986, under the Central Ministry of Environment and Forests (Indians), to direct and manage research and education in forestry sector in India. ICFRE is headed by a Director General with headquarters at Dehradun. ICFRE became an autonomous council under the Ministry in 1991.

== Mandate ==
The mandate of the ICFRE is to organise, direct and manage research and education in the forestry sector, including in cooperation with FORTIP (UNDP/FAO Regional Forest Tree Improvement Project), UNDP and World Bank on economically important species. ICFRE established a National Bureau of Forest Genetic Resources (NBFGR).

=== Research perspective ===
- Conservation, protection, regeneration, rehabilitation and sustainable development of natural forest ecosystems.
- Revegetation of barren, waste, marginal and mined lands.
- Research on tree improvement.
- Enhancing productivity of wood and non-wood forest produce per unit of area per unit time by application of scientific and technological methods.
- Research on improved utilisation, recovery and processing of forest produce for value addition and employment generation.
- Ecological rehabilitation of all fragile ecosystems, such as mountains, mangroves, deserts etc.
- Socio-economic and policy research for developing strategies towards attracting people's participation in forest management.

== Research institutes ==
Institute and their locations, sorted alphabetically
Name	Photo	Acronym	Established	City	Jurisdiction	Website
Arid Forest Research Institute (AFRI)		ICFRE-AFRI	1988	Jodhpur	Rajasthan, Gujarat, Dadra and Nagar Haveli	afri.res.in
Forest Research Institute (FRI)		ICFRE-FRI	1906	Dehradun	Uttarakhand, Haryana, Chandigarh, Delhi, Uttar Pradesh, Punjab	fri.icfre.gov.in
Himalayan Forest Research Institute (HFRI)		ICFRE-HFRI	1977	Shimla	Himachal Pradesh, Jammu and Kashmir	hfri.icfre.gov.in
Institute of Forest Biodiversity (IFB)		ICFRE-IFB	2012	Hyderabad	Telangana, Maharashtra	ifb.icfre.gov.in
Institute of Forest Genetics and Tree Breeding (IFGTB)		ICFRE-IFGTB	1988	Coimbatore	Tamil Nadu, Kerala, Andaman and Nicobar Islands, Lakshadweep, Puducherry	ifgtb.icfre.gov.in#/
Institute of Forest Productivity (IFP)		ICFRE-IFP	1993	Ranchi	Jharkhand, Bihar, West Bengal, Sikkim	web.archive.org
Institute of Wood Science and Technology (IWST)		ICFRE-IWST	1938	Bengaluru	Karnataka, Telangana, Andhra Pradesh, Goa	iwst.icfre.gov.in#/
Rain Forest Research Institute (RFRI)		ICFRE-RFRI	1988	Jorhat	Assam	rfri.icfre.gov.in
Tropical Forest Research Institute (TFRI)		ICFRE-TFRI	1988	Jabalpur	Madhya Pradesh, Chhattisgarh, Maharashtra, Odisha	tfri.icfre.gov.in

== Advanced research Centres ==
Institute and their locations, sorted alphabetically
Name	Photo	Acronym	Established	City	Jurisdiction	Website
Advanced Research Centre for Bamboo and Rattan (a unit of RFRI)		ARCBR	2004	Aizawl	Northeast India	www.icfre.org
Centre for Forestry Research and Human Resource Development (satellite centre of TFRI)		CFRHRD	1995	Chhindwara	Madhya Pradesh, Chhattisgarh, Maharashtra, Odisha	www.icfre.org
Centre for Social Forestry and Eco-Rehabilitation (a centre of ICFRE)		CSFER	1992	Prayagraj	Eastern Uttar Pradesh, North Bihar, Vindhya Range	www.icfre.org
Centre for Forest Based Livelihood and Extension		CFLE	2013	Agartala	Tripura	www.tripurainfo.com
Centre for Urban Forestry and Landscape Management (a centre of AFRI)		UF&LM	(Planned)	Gandhinagar	Gujarat	

== See also ==
- Afforestation
- Air pollution in India
- Central Pollution Control Board
- Communal forests of India
- Conservation reserves and community reserves of India
- Director General of Forests
- Environmental issues in India
- Forest management
- Forest produce (India)
- Forest range officer
- Forest Survey of India
- Indian Forest Act, 1927
- Indian Forest Service
- Indian Institute of Forest Management (IIFM)
- Indira Priyadarshini Vrikshamitra Awards
- Joint Forest Management
- List of forest research institutes
- List of forest research institutes in India
- Reserved forests and protected forests of India
- Social forestry in India
- Tropical rainforests of India
- Urban forestry
- Wildlife Institute of India (WII)
- Wildlife of India
- Rain Forest Research Institute
