= Social forestry in India =

Forestry intended to help environmental, social, and rural development

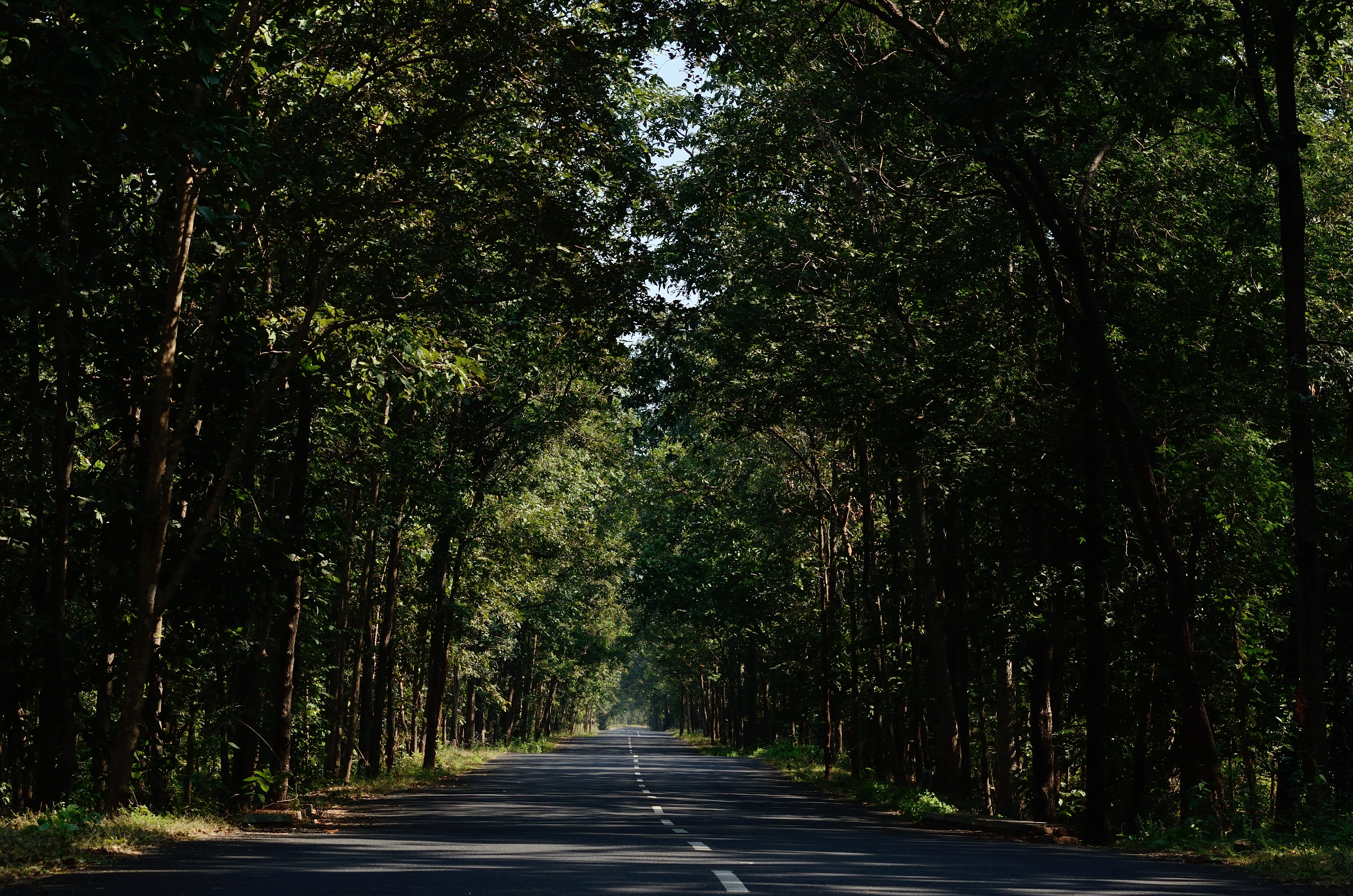
Social forestry near Mothugudem of Khammam district in Andhra Pradesh, India

Social forestry is the management and protection of forests and afforestation of barren and deforested lands with the purpose of helping environmental, social and rural development. The term social forestry was first used in 1976 by The National Commission on Agriculture, when the government of India aimed to reduce pressure on forests by planting trees on all unused and fallow lands. It was intended as a democratic approach to forest conservation and usage, maximizing land utilization for multiple purposes.

The Indian government attempted to expand forest areas which were close to human settlements and which had degraded due to human activities. Trees were planted along railway lines, roadsides, rivers and canal banks, in village common land, government wasteland, and panchayat land, and were to be planted in and around agricultural fields. Among the goals were to increase fuel availability in rural areas and to prevent soil erosion. This program was a failure due to the lack of governance, and management was delegated to the village panchayats (village councils).

== Demands and development ==
People felt the need for a social forestry scheme because India has a dominant rural population that depends largely on fuelwood and other biomass for their cooking and heating. These demands will increase with population, threatening to reduce forested areas.

=== Participation ===
The social forestry scheme sought to enable the common people to raise plantations which would meet the growing demand for timber, fuelwood, fodder, etc., and thereby reduce pressure on traditional forest areas. This concept of village forests to meet the needs of rural people had existed for centuries across India. With the introduction of this scheme, the government formally recognized the rights of local communities to forest resources and encouraged rural participation in the management of natural resources. Through the social forestry scheme, the government has involved community participation, as part of a drive towards afforestation, and rehabilitating the degraded forest and common lands.

Bihar, one of the poorest states of India, lacked National Rural Employment Guarantee Act (NREGA) employment during the flood season, and this work was only suitable for able-bodied people. Linking the social forestry scheme to NREGA was hoped to reduce poverty and climate change. To ensure adequate care for the plants, their ownership was given to those who had cared for them for five years. Within 3 years, forest coverage in the region grew from 7% to 12.86%, and provided employment to thousands of women, disabled and elderly people.

After managing the projects for five years, the government delegated authority to the village panchayats (village councils) to manage for themselves and generate products or revenue as they saw fit.

== Objectives ==
Social forestry schemes have the main objectives to:

- Improve the environment for protecting agriculture from adverse climatic factors,
- Increase the supply of fuelwood for domestic use, small timber for rural housing, fodder for livestock, and minor forest produce for local industries,
- Increase the natural beauty of the landscape; create recreational forests for the benefit of rural and urban populations,
- Provide jobs for unskilled workers,
- Effect land rehabilitation, and
- Raise the standard of living and quality of life of rural and urban people.

The mission of the scheme is:

- To carry out a need-based and time-bound program of afforestation with special emphasis on fuelwood and fodder development on all degraded and denuded lands/forests.
- Effect afforestation of abandoned jhum lands and mined areas.
- Establish linear strip plantation of fast-growing species on sides of public roads, rivers, streams and irrigation canals.
- Effect afforestation on under-utilized lands under state, institutional or private ownership.
- Create green belts in urban/industrial areas.
- Create shelterbelts (generally more extensive than the windbreaks) for the purpose of shelter from wind and sun covering areas larger than a single farm on a planned pattern.
- Establish farm forestry in the form of raising rows of trees on boundaries of fields and individual trees in private agricultural land as well as the creation of windbreaks around a farm or orchard by raising one or two lines of trees.
- Raise flowering trees and shrubs to serve as recreation forests for the urban and rural population.
- Elicit people's participation, involving women and young people in the conservation of forests, wildlife, and the environment.
- Generate environmental awareness and promote environmental events

== Types ==
Social forestry schemes can be categorized into groups: farm forestry, community forestry, extension forestry and agroforestry.

=== Farm forestry ===
In Farm forestry or agroforestry, trees are grown on farmland for commercial and non-commercial purposes. Farmers are encouraged to plant trees on their own farmland to meet their domestic needs. A tradition of growing trees on farmland already existed in many areas, and was the main thrust of most of India's social forestry projects. In addition to providing fuelwood, farmers often grow trees to provide shade for agricultural crops, as wind shelters, for soil conservation or to recover wasteland.

The pulp and paper industry is a major demand driver for certain species of tree such as Eucalyptus, Babul Acacia catechu, Subabul (Leucaena leucocephala) and Casuarina equisetifolia. As a rough estimate, the total demand for pulpwood is approximately 10 million air-dried metric ton (ADMT; wood having 10% moisture). The Indian Paper Manufacturer's Association is an umbrella organization that coordinates and drives plantation efforts by member organizations in India to supply its industrial requirements.

=== Community forestry ===
In community forestry, the government provides seedlings and fertilizer to the community, which is then responsible for nurturing and protecting the plants on community land. This provides for the community rather than individuals. Fast-growing Eucalyptus has been planted on a large scale. Some communities manage these plantations sensibly and in a sustainable manner for continual benefit, while others sell the mature timber for a one-time capital divestment.

=== Extension forestry ===
Planting of trees on the sides of roads, canals and railways, along with planting on wastelands is known as extension forestry, increasing the boundaries of forests. This has created wood lots in the village common lands, government wastelands, and panchayat lands.

=== Agroforestry ===
In agroforestry, silvicultural practices are combined with agricultural crops like legumes, along with orchard farming and livestock ranching on the same piece of land. It is defined as a sustainable land-use system that maintains or increases the total yield by combining food crop together with forest tree and livestock ranching on the same unit of land, using management practices that consider the social and cultural characteristics of the local people and the economic and ecological condition of the area.

== Partners ==
Major non-governmental organizations who partner in the implementation of the social forestry scheme are:

- Sri Soneswar Nath Mahadev Trust (SANMAT)
- National Green Highway Mission (NGHM)
- Bihar forestry Development Corporation Limited

== See also ==
- Indian Council of Forestry Research and Education
- Ministry of Environment and Forests (India)
- Panchayati Raj
- Joint Forest Management
- Silviculture
- Afforestation
- Reforestation
- Sustainable development
- Timeline of environmental events
- Van Vigyan Kendra (VVK) Forest Science Centres
- List of forest research institutes in India
