= Himalayan Forest Research Institute =

Research institute in Shimla, Himachal Pradesh, India

Himalayan Forest Research Institute (HFRI)
- Type: Education and Research institute
- Established: 1977
- Parent institution: ICFRE
- Location: (India) Conifer Campus Panthaghati, Shimla, Himachal Pradesh, India 171009
- Campus: Urban
- Acronym: HFRI
- Website: hfri.icfre.gov.in

Himalayan Forest Research Institute (HFRI) is a Research institute situated in Shimla in Himachal Pradesh. It works under the Indian Council of Forestry Research and Education (ICFRE) of the Ministry of Environment and Forests, Govt. of India.

== Divisions ==
- Forest Ecology & Climate Change Division
- Forest Protection Division
- Silviculture & Forest Management Division
- Genetics & Tree Improvement Division
- Extension Division

== See also ==
- Indian Council of Forestry Research and Education
- Van Vigyan Kendra (VVK) Forest Science Centres
- Social forestry in India
