= Institute of Forest Productivity =

Research institute in Ranchi, Jharkhand, India

Institute of Forest Productivity (IFP)
- Type: Education and Research institute
- Established: 1993
- Parent institution: ICFRE
- Director: Dr. Amit Pandey
- Location: (India) NH 23, Gumla Road, Lalgutwa, Ranchi, Jharkhand, India 835303; 23.3578795°N 85.2448407°E
- Campus: Urban
- Acronym: IFP
- Website: ifp.icfre.gov.in

The Institute of Forest Productivity (IFP) is a research institute situated in Ranchi in state of Jharkhand. It works under the Indian Council of Forestry Research and Education (ICFRE) of the Ministry of Environment, Forest and Climate Change, Government of India.

== See also ==
- Van Vigyan Kendra (VVK) Forest Science Centres
