= Institute of Wood Science and Technology =

Indian research institute

Institute of Wood Science and Technology (IWST)
- Type: Education and Research institute
- Established: 1938
- Parent institution: ICFRE
- Location: (India) 18th Cross, Malleshwaram, Bangalore, Karnataka, India 560003; 13.011160°N 77.570185°E
- Campus: Urban : Spread over 25 acres (0.10 km^{2})
- Acronym: IWST
- Website: iwst.icfre.gov.in

The Institute of Wood Science and Technology (IWST) is a research institute situated in Bangalore in Karnataka. It works under the Indian Council of Forestry Research and Education (ICFRE) of the Ministry of Environment and Forests, Govt. of India. It is recognized to be a Centre of Excellence for Sandalwood Research and Wood Science.

== History ==
The Institute of Wood Science and Technology (IWST), located in Bangalore, India, has a rich history that dates back to its inception in the early 20th century. The concept of establishing a dedicated forest research institution in Mysore State was first conceived by Dr. M. N. Ramaswamy and Dr. S. A. Kabir during their training as probationers of the Mysore Forest Service in Munich, Germany, from 1932 to 1935.

Upon their return, the duo faced initial resistance, as they were directed towards administrative roles. However, with the support of Sir Mirza Ismail, the then Diwan of Mysore, and other influential officers, the establishment of the Forest Research Section was approved by the Government of Mysore in December 1935. Operations commenced on 2 January 1936, in a modest setting within the Mysore Agricultural Laboratories.

In 1937, Dr. Ramaswamy and Dr. Kabir were deputed to the Forest Research Institute (FRI) in Dehradun to study its organizational structure. Subsequently, leveraging the unused depreciation fund of the Departmental Wood Preservation Plant in Bhadravati, they secured financing for the construction of the Forest Research Laboratory. The Government sanctioned the establishment in January 1938, and by 17 October 1938, the laboratory was inaugurated. Designed by renowned architect S. H. Lakshminarasappa and constructed under the supervision of engineer B. R. Garudachar, the building was completed in just nine months. Its strategic location near the Indian Institute of Science (IISc) and other scientific facilities further enhanced its research capabilities.

During World War II, the laboratory played a crucial role in supporting the war effort by developing battery separators using indigenous tree species such as Adina cordifolia, Bombax malabaricum, and Michelia champak. Additionally, it actively participated in the Mysore Dasara Exhibition, showcasing forestry research advancements.

In the post-war years, the laboratory expanded its activities. By 1956, it achieved the status of a Central Government institution, becoming a regional research laboratory affiliated with FRI Dehradun. The campus also saw the establishment of the Sandal Research Centre and a Minor Forest Products Unit in 1977.

A significant milestone was reached in 1988 when the Forest Research Laboratory was upgraded to the Institute of Wood Science and Technology under the Indian Council of Forestry Research and Education (ICFRE). Modernization efforts continued with the construction of the Van Vignan building in 1997, which now houses the laboratories and workshops. Today, IWST stands as a leading institution in forestry research, contributing to sustainable management and conservation of forest resources in India.

== Research and development ==
The Institute has the following facilities and expertise for rendering services to user industry and Government and non-government organisations:

1. Xylarium with authentically identified Indian and foreign wood samples, with expertise to identify different timber species.
2. Authentic identification of wood-decaying fungi, insects, marine wood borers and foulers.
3. Cultures of wood-decaying fungi for reference and laboratory bioassay purposes.
4. Accelerated laboratory bioassay of candidate wood preservative chemicals against wood-deteriorating fungi and insects.
5. Testing of timber and timber products (untreated and treated) under land and marine conditions to evaluate their performance against biodeterioration.
6. Testing of timber and timber products for determining the strength properties.
7. Soil and plant analysis (for both micro- and macro-nutrients).
8. Mist chamber and green house for vegetative propagation.
9. Tissue culture laboratory.
10. Seed Technology Laboratory.
11. Vegetative Propagation Facilities.
12. Xenotest weatherometer for accelerated weathering experiments.
13. Timber seasoning kiln and expertise for setting up solar seasoning kiln.
14. Pressure-treatment plant for preservative-treatment of timber.
15. T.L.C.
16. G.L.C.
17. H.P.L.C.
18. UV, IR and Atomic Absorption Spectrophotometer
19. X-ray Fluorescence Analyzer
20. Flow Injection Analyzer
21. Nitrogen Analyzer
22. Bomb Calorimeter
23. FTIR
24. Biochamber for Entomological studies
25. Universal Testing Machine
26. Sophisticated Microscopes with Cameras and Video attachments and Image Analysis Systems and (m) SpectroFLUOROmeter
27. Workshop for processing wood samples for various experiments.
28. Chemical analysis of oils, gums, tannins and other non-wood forest products.
29. A seed orchard of sandal for supplying quality seeds.
30. Advice on nursery practices, silviculture and plant protection against fungal and insect attack.
31. Transfer of technology for improved agroforestry systems.
32. Advice on protection and management of mangrove ecosystems from biodeterioration point-of-view.
33. Advice on simple, inexpensive wood-preservation techniques (sap displacement method).
34. Advice on timber utilisation for catamaran, other fishing crafts and marine structures.
35. Model nursery at Nagaroor in collaboration with State Forest Department has been established.

A shore laboratory for studies on marine wood biodeterioration at Visakhapatnam has been established under World Bank aided Project. Additional land of 40 ha. has been acquired in Karnataka for establishment of germplasm bank, provenance, progeny trials, multiplication garden and seed orchards. A new ICFRE Research Centre with assistance from World Bank on a 100 acres land is being established at Hyderabad.

== Research Divisions ==
1. Wood Properties and Processing
2. Plywood and Panel Product Technology
3. Forest Protection
4. Silviculture and Forest Management
5. Extension
6. Facilities and Services

== See also ==
- Indian Council of Forestry Research and Education
- Van Vigyan Kendra (VVK) Forest Science Centres
