= Hemendra Singh Panwar =

Indian conservationist and civil servant (1937–2026)

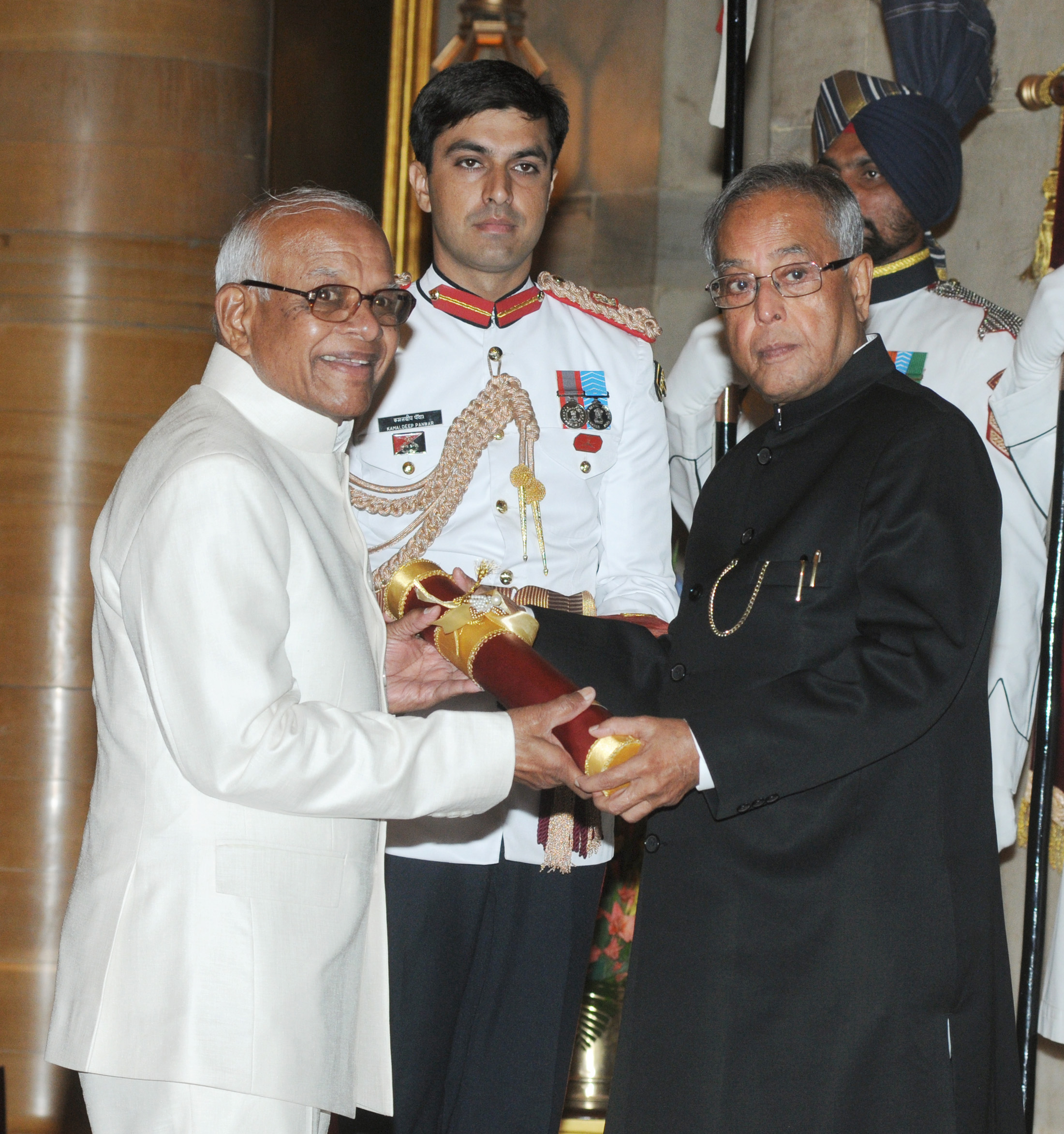
- Panwar (left) receiving the Padma Bhushan from President Pranab Mukherjee (right), 2013
- Born: 22 March 1937; Balaghat district, Central Provinces and Berar, British India
- Died: 29 May 2026 (aged 89)
- Awards: Padma Bhushan (2013)

Hemendra Singh Panwar (22 March 1937 – 29 May 2026) was an Indian conservationist and civil servant, known for his efforts in the fields of wildlife and conservation. He was the first director of the Wildlife Institute of India and was the director of Project Tiger. The Government of India honoured him, in 2013, with Padma Bhushan, the third-highest civilian award, for his services to the environment and conservation.

== Biography ==
Hemendra Singh Panwar was born on 22 March 1937 in Balaghat district of Central Provinces and Berar. He started his career in Indian Forest Service, which took off with his posting at Mandla. In 1969, he was transferred to South Mandla which covered the forest areas of Kanha which had a sparse head count of 30 tigers and Barasinghas (swamp deer) numbering 66. Panwar's efforts on deer conservation was given a boost when he was put in charge of barasingha conservation as an independent unit.

During his stint at Kanha, Panwar was reported to be successful in converting the park into an efficiently managed unit, and the park won the award for the best managed park in India in 1976. The headcount of tigers grew to 150 and the deer to over 400 and the park management was able to relocate 22 interior villages.

In 1981, Panwar was transferred to Delhi, as the head of Project Tiger, a project conceptualised in 1973, for the protection of tiger population in India. He worked for 4 years on the project, till 1985, during which time, the project brought seven additional reserves under its umbrella. The population of tigers in India rose from 1900 to 3000. He was also invited to present a paper on the subject by the Smithsonian Institution.

At this time, the idea of setting up an institute focusing wildlife conservation was being mooted by V. B. Saharia, and as a result of his efforts, the Wildlife Institute of India was established in 1985 with Hemendra Singh Panwar as its first director. Panwar established the institute into a full-fledged learning centre with specialised focus on wildlife biology, management, and extension. Research facilities were also set up in the topics of focus. The Wildlife Institute of India is rated as one of the six best conservation research institutions by the World Conservation Union and has won Rajiv Gandhi Conservation Award. Panwar retired as its director in 1994.

Panwar died on 29 May 2026, at the age of 89.

== Awards and recognition ==
Hemendra Singh Panwar has won several awards and honours for his services.

- Padma Bhushan – 2013
- The Duke of Edinburgh Conservation Medal – WWF International – 2002
- Rajiv Gandhi Wildlife Conservation Award – 1998
- Tree of Learning Award – World Conservation Union (WCA-IUCN) – 1996
- Fred M. Parker International Parks Merit Award – World Conservation Union (WCA-IUCN) – 1996
- Prime Minister's Memento in 1992 for Project Tiger
- Government of Madhya Pradesh Gold Medal – 1981

== Works ==
- Hemendra S. Panwar; Vijay Singh Negi (1981). Kanha National Park: A Handbook. Ahmedabad: Centre for Environment Education Ahmedabad, in collaboration with United States National Park Service as a project of the Indo-US Subcommission on Science & Technology. p. 132. OCLC 80152524.
- Hemendra S. Panwar (2009). Reviving river Yamuna : an actionable blue print for a blue river. Delhi: PEACE Institute Charitable Trust. p. 76. OCLC 505927369.
- Hemendra S. Panwar; W. A. Rogers; Vinod P. Mathur (2002). Wildlife protected area network in India : a review, executive summary. Dehradun: Wildlife Institute of India. p. 44. ISBN 9788185496139. OCLC 50717212.
- Trishna Dutta; Sandeep Sharma; Jess E Maldonado; Thomas C Wood; Hemendra S Panwar; John Seidensticker. Gene flow and demographic history of leopards (Panthera pardus) in the central Indian highlands. Evolutionary Applications. pp. 949–959. OCLC 5148085588.
- Sandeep Sharma; Trishna Dutta; Jess E Maldonado; Thomas C Wood; Hemendra Singh Panwar; John Seidensticker. "Selection of microsatellite loci for genetic monitoring of sloth bears". Ursus: 164–169. ISSN 1537-6176. OCLC 5526234856.

== See also ==
- Wildlife Institute of India
- Project Tiger
- International Union for Conservation of Nature
- World Wide Fund for Nature
