= Forest Research Centre for Eco-Rehabilitation =

Research institute in Prayagraj, Uttar Pradesh, India

- Other names: FRCER
- Type: Education and Research institute
- Established: 1992; 34 years ago
- Parent institution: ICFRE
- Director-General: Kanchan Devi, IFS
- Location: Prayagraj, Uttar Pradesh, India
- Campus: Urban
- Website: frcer.icfre.org

Forest Research Centre for Eco-Rehabilitation (FRCER) is a research institute located in Prayagraj, Uttar Pradesh, India. It was established in 1992 as an advanced centre under the umbrella of ICFRE, Dehradun. The centre aims to nurture and cultivate professional excellence in the field of social forestry and eco-rehabilitation in Eastern Uttar Pradesh, North Bihar and Vindhyan Region of Uttar Pradesh and Madhya Pradesh.

== Research activities ==
- Planting Stock Improvement Programme (PSIP)
- Wasteland reclamation
- Development of Agro-forestry Models
- Reclamation of mined areas through afforestation
- Productivity of Ecosystem
- Studies on Shisham mortality

== See also ==
- Indian Council of Forestry Research and Education
- Van Vigyan Kendra (VVK) Forest Science Centres
