= Centre for Forestry Research and Human Resource Development =

Indian forest research institute

- Type: Education and Research institute
- Established: 1995
- Parent institution: ICFRE
- Location: Chhindwara, Madhya Pradesh, India
- Campus: Urban
- Acronym: CFRHRD
- Website: www.icfre.org

The Centre for Forestry Research and Human Resource Development Chhindwara was established in 1995 as an advanced research centre under the umbrella of ICFRE, Dehradun.

== Mandate ==
Forestry research with Human Resource Development in areas like biodiversity conservation, forest protection, silviculture, non-wood forest products, socio economics and tree improvement for poverty alleviation. The main stake holders for training programmes are farmer, students, Forest officers and scientist from forestry sector.

== See also ==
- Indian Council of Forestry Research and Education
- Van Vigyan Kendra (VVK) Forest Science Centres
