= Tropical Forest Research Institute =

Research institute in Jabalpur, Madhya Pradesh, India

Tropical Forest Research Institute (TFRI)
- Type: Education and Research institute
- Established: 1988
- Parent institution: ICFRE
- Director: Dr. Neelu Singh
- Location: (India) PO R.F.R.C., Mandla Road Jabalpur, Madhya Pradesh, India 482021; 23.099132°N 79.989333°E
- Campus: Urban : Spread over 1,010.66 acres (4.0900 km^{2})
- Acronym: TFRI
- Website: tfri.icfre.gov.in

Tropical Forest Research Institute (TFRI) is a Research institute situated in Jabalpur in Madhya Pradesh. It works under the Indian Council of Forestry Research and Education of the Ministry of Environment, Forest and Climate Change, Government of India.

== Divisions ==
- Agro-forestry
- Biodiversity and sustainable management
- Tropical forest ecology and rehabilitation
- Forest entomology
- Forest pathology
- Genetics and plant propagation
- Non-wood forest produce
- Silviculture and joint forest management
- Extension

== Areas of research ==
- Biodiversity assessment, conservation and development
- Sustainable forest management
- Planting stock improvement
- Climate change
- Environmental amelioration
- Forest products development
- Biofuels from forests
- Development of agroforestry models
- Forest protection
- Forest extension

== See also ==
- List of Environment and Forest Research Institutes in India
- Van Vigyan Kendra Forest Science Centres
