= Rain Forest Research Institute =

Research institute in Jorhat, Assam, India

ICFRE-Rain Forest Research Institute (ICFRE-RFRI)
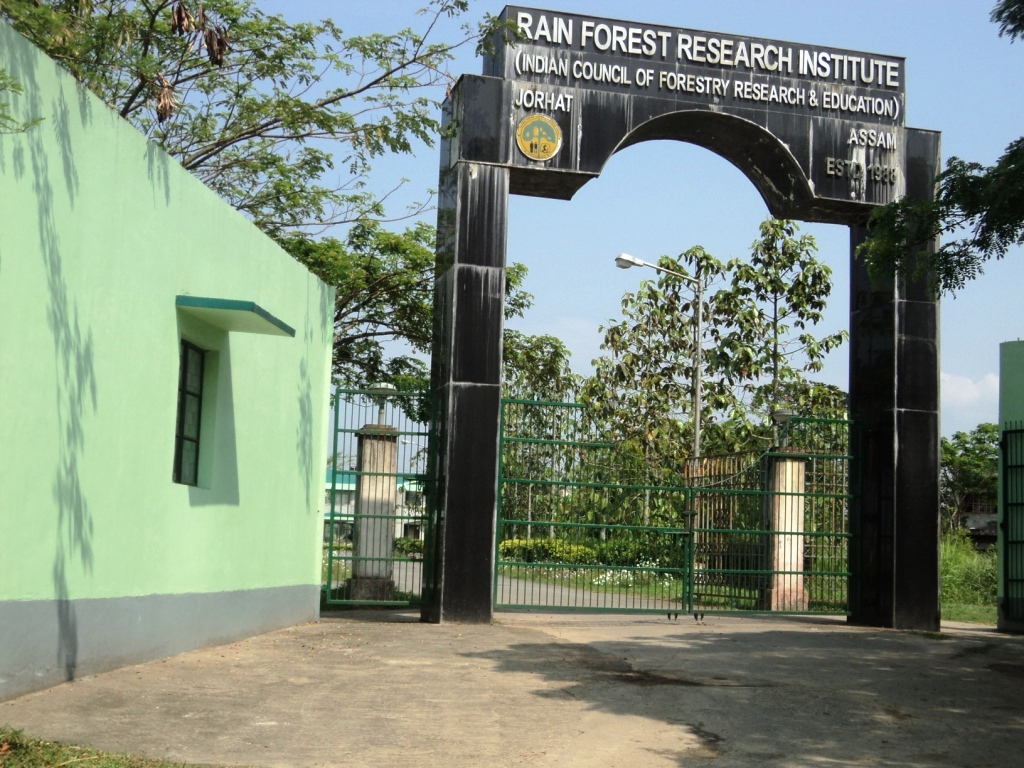
- Main entrance of ICFRE-Rain Forest Research Institute
- Type: Education and Research institute
- Established: 1988 (38 years ago)
- Parent institution: ICFRE
- Director: Dr. Nitin Kulkarni
- Location: (India) P.O. Box No-136, A.T.Road (East) Jorhat, Assam, India; 26.782412°N 94.294161°E
- Campus: Rural
- Acronym: ICFRE-RFRI
- Website: rfri.icfre.gov.in

Rain Forest Research Institute (RFRI) is a research institute situated in Jorhat in Assam. It works under the Indian Council of Forestry Research and Education (ICFRE) of the Ministry of Environment, Forest and Climate Change, Government of India.

As of January 2022, there are a total of 51 members in this research institute, at present, there are three departments here, that are, the Department of Biotechnology, the Department of Chemistry and the Department of Entomology.

Some recent publications include:-

- Microbial Fuel Cells for Wastewater Treatment
- Recent Advances in Direct C−H Trifluoromethylation of N‐Heterocycles
- The comparative soil fertility in traditional and alder-based shifting cultivation of varied fallow lengths in Eastern Indian Himalayas
- Satellite-based integrated approaches to modelling spatial carbon stock and carbon sequestration potential of different land use of Northeast India
- Predicting Soil Cation Exchange Capacity in Entisols with Divergent Textural Classes: The Case of Northern Sudan Soils
- Biomass and vegetation carbon stock in mangrove forests of the Andaman Islands, India

The North East Institute of Science and Technology (NEIST) has collaborated with Rain Forest Research Institute for the research and development of forestry in the Northeastern parts of India.

== See also ==
- Indian Council of Forestry Research and Education
- List of Environment and Forest Research Institutes in India
- Van Vigyan Kendra (VVK) Forest Science Centres
