= Wildlife Crime Control Bureau =

- Abbreviation: WCCB
- Motto: "Fighting Transboundary Environmental Crime"

Agency overview
- Formed: 6 June 2007
- Employees: Classified
- Annual budget: ₹13.86 crore (US$1.5 million) (2025–26)

Jurisdictional structure
- National agency: India
- Operations jurisdiction: India
- Governing body: Government of India

Operational structure
- Headquarters: Trikoot-1 Building, 2nd Floor, Bhikaji Cama Place, New Delhi-110066
- Minister responsible: Bhupendra Yadav, Ministry of Environment, Forest and Climate Change
- Agency executives: Ramesh Kumar Pandey IFS, Director; Ruchika Rishi, IGP, IPS, Additional Director
- Parent agency: Ministry of Environment, Forest and Climate Change

Website
- wccb.gov.in

Wildlife Crime Control Bureau (WCCB) is a statutory body established by the Government of India under the Ministry of Environment, Forest and Climate Change to combat organised wildlife crime. The Wild Life (Protection) Amendment Act, 2006 provisions came in to force on 6 June 2007. It became operational in the year 2008.

WCCB won the 2010 Clark R. Bavin Wildlife Law Enforcement Awards for its outstanding work on wildlife law enforcement in the country, which was received by Ramesh K Pandey, Deputy Director, on behalf of WCCB. UNEP has also awarded WCCB with Asia Environment Enforcement Award, 2018.

WCCB is also partnering with United Nations University and CIESIN-Earth Institute at Columbia University through the Wildlife Enforcement Monitoring System Initiative.

== See also ==
- Hunting license
- List of endangered animals in India
