= Institute of Forest Genetics and Tree Breeding =

Forestry Research institute in Coimbatore, Tamil Nadu, India

Institute of Forest Genetics and Tree Breeding (IFGTB)
- Type: Education and Research institute
- Established: 1988
- Parent institution: ICFRE
- Location: P.B. No. 1061, R.S. Puram P.O. Coimbatore, Tamil Nadu, India 342005
- Campus: Urban : Spread over 163.09 acres (0.6600 km^{2})
- acronym: IFGTB
- Website: ifgtb.icfre.gov.in

Institute of Forest Genetics and Tree Breeding (IFGTB) is a Forestry Research institute situated in Coimbatore in Tamil Nadu. It works under the Indian Council of Forestry Research and Education (ICFRE) of the Ministry of Environment, Forest and Climate Change, Government of India.Institute of Forest Genetics and Tree Breeding is a national institute formed in April, 1988 under the Indian Council of Forestry Research and Education (ICFRE), an autonomous council under the Ministry of Environment and Forests, Government of India. To identify and evolve varieties of species used in afforestation and social forestry that will contribute to the national goal of achieving a growth of 3 to 4 cubic meters of biomass per ha per year within the ecological considerations applicable to the area.

== See also ==
- Indian Council of Forestry Research and Education
