= Instituto Forestal =

Chilean research institute

The Instituto Forestal (INFOR) or Instituto Forestal de Chile is a Chilean public service tasked with carrying out research and development programmes related to the forestry sector in Chile. It belongs to the belonging to the Ministry of Agriculture. Instituto Forestal began in 1961 (65 years ago) as a project by the Food and Agriculture Organization (FAO), and was officially created by the Government of Chile in 1965 (61 years ago). It has 5 centers in Chile.

1. Sede metropolitana in Santiago
2. Sede Bio Bio in San Pedro de la Paz
3. Sede Valdivia in Valdivia
4. Sede Diaguita in La Serena
5. Sede Patagonia in Coyhaique
