= Forest Research Centre for Bamboo and Rattan =

Education and research centre in India

ICFRE-Bamboo and Rattan Centre (ICFRE-BRC)
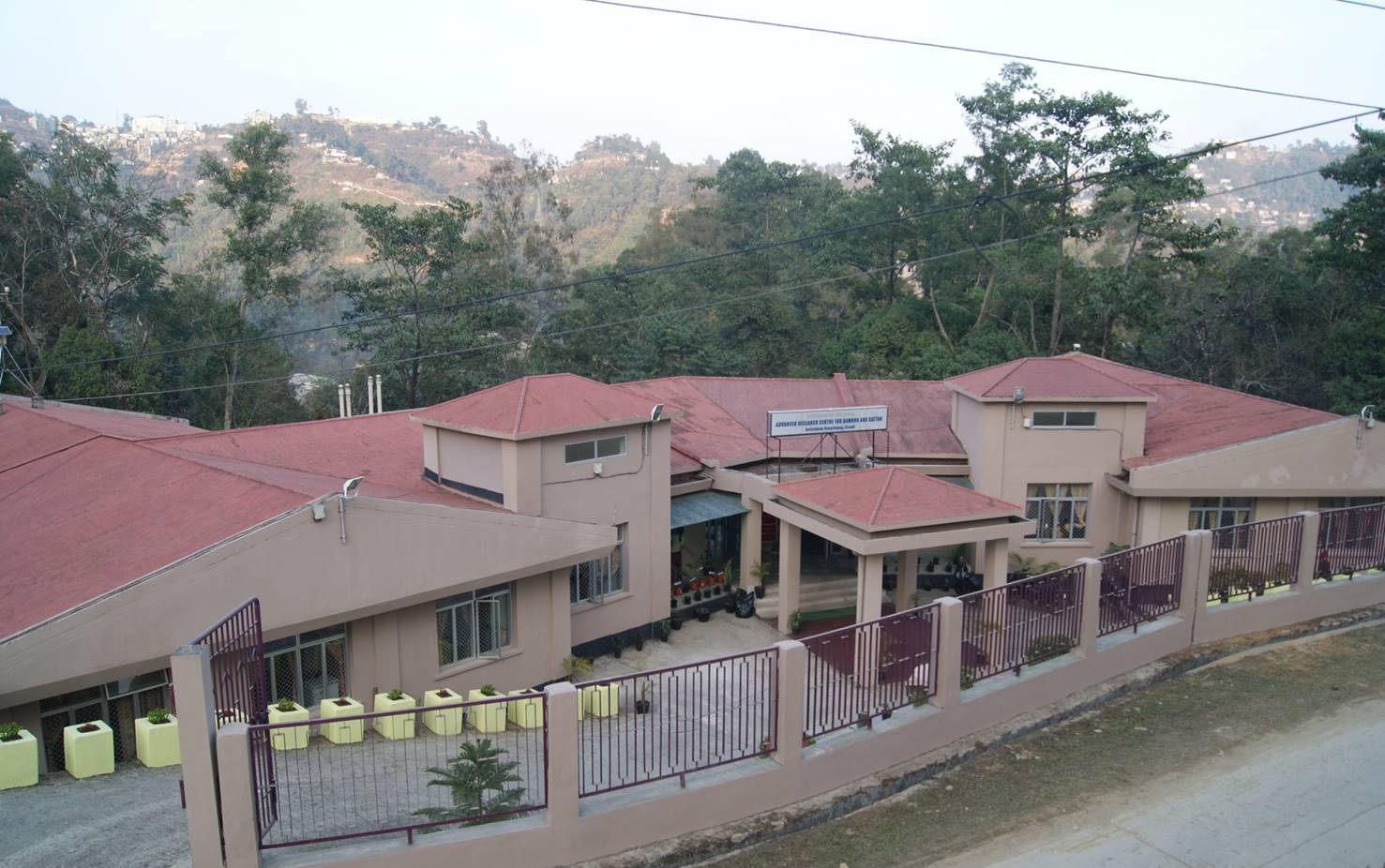
- Established: 2004
- Research type: Education and research institute
- Location: Aizawl, Mizoram, India
- Campus: Urban
- Acronym: ICFRE-BRC
- Operating agency: ICFRE
- Website: icfre.org

The ICFRE-Bamboo and Rattan Centre (ICFRE-BRC) was established as an advanced research centre under the Indian Council of Forestry Research and Education, Dehradun. in 2004 at Aizawl, Mizoram as a unit of Rain Forest Research Institute (RFRI), Jorhat, Assam in accordance with the decision taken by the Standing Finance Committee, Ministry of Environment & Forests, Govt. of India. The Centre was inaugurated by the Hon’ble Minister of State, Environment and Forests, Govt. of India Shri Namo Narain Meena, on 29th Nov. 2004 at Bethlehem Vengthlang, Aizawl. The Centre is first of its kind in India for socio-economic upliftment of Northeastern people that revolve around Bamboos and Rattans.

== See also ==
- Indian Council of Forestry Research and Education
- Van Vigyan Kendra (VVK) Forest Science Centre
