= Laboratory for the Conservation of Endangered Species =

Research lab in Hyderabad, India

LaCONES or Laboratory for the Conservation of Endangered Species, is a Council of Scientific and Industrial Research lab located in Hyderabad. It was conceptualised by Lalji Singh. It is India's only research facility engaged in conservation and preservation of wildlife and its resources. It was established in 1998 with the help of Central Zoo Authority of India, CSIR and the government of Andhra Pradesh. It was dedicated to the nation in 2007 by then President of India, APJ Abdul Kalam. It is a part of the Centre for cellular and molecular biology. India's first genetic bank for wildlife conservation, the National wildlife genetic resource bank (NWGRB) established by the government at LaCONES in 2018.

== See also ==
- Billy Arjan Singh
- Vava Suresh
