= Arid Forest Research Institute =

Indian forest research institute

Arid Forest Research Institute of India
- शुष्क वन अनुसंधान संस्थान
- Type: Education and Research institute
- Established: 1985
- Parent institution: ICFRE
- Director: M. AKTripathi
- Location: PO Kirshi Upaz Mandi, New Pali Road, Jodhpur, Rajasthan, India 342005; 26.228744°N 73.031412°E
- Campus: Urban: Spread over 187.09 acres (76 ha)
- Acronym: ICFRE-AFRI (आफरी)
- Website: afri.res.in, afri.icfre.gov.in

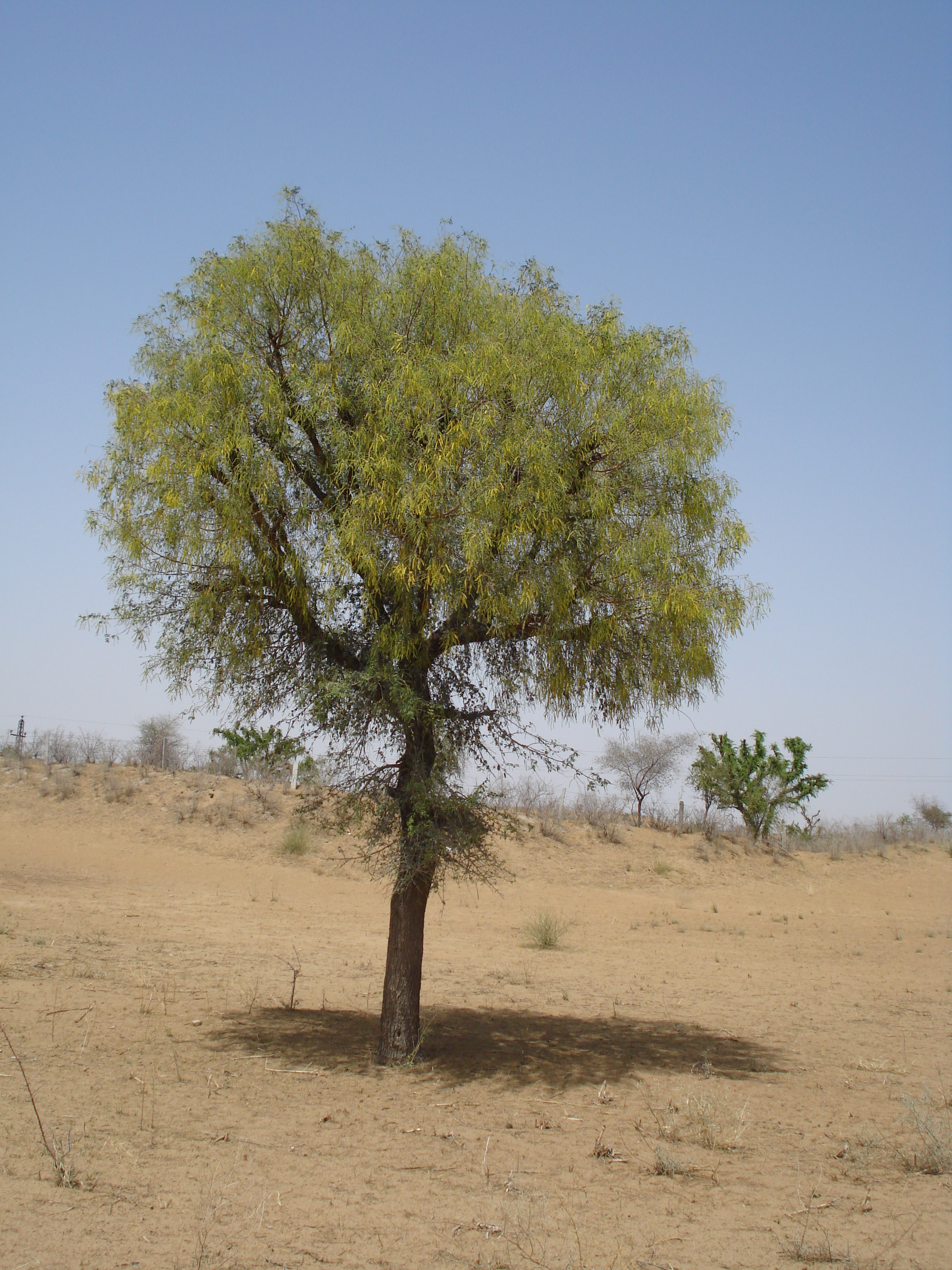
Prosopis cineraria or Khejri

Arid Forest Research Institute (ICFRE-AFRI) is a research institute situated in Jodhpur, Rajasthan, India. The institute conducts scientific research in forestry in order to provide technologies to increase the vegetative cover and to conserve biodiversity in the hot arid and semi-arid regions of Rajasthan and Gujarat. It helps to provide data and information to prevent and mitigate water scarcity related problems which affect the environment and people. It operates under the Indian Council of Forestry Research and Education (ICFRE) of the Ministry of Environment, Forest and Climate Change, Government of India.

== About ==
The Arid Forest Research Institute was established in 1985 to cater the forestry research needs of the arid and semi-arid region of Rajasthan, Gujarat, Dadra and Nagar Haveli, and Daman-Diu.

The institute is situated on Jodhpur Pali Road (NH 65) in a campus spreading over 66 hectares, housing office buildings, laboratories, a library-cum-information center, community center, guest house, scientist hostel and residential quarters.

The institute has an additional campus at Plot No. 729 adjoining CAZRI. The institute also has three experimental areas and a model nursery within the vicinity of the main campus.

== History ==
The Institute of Arid Zone Forestry Research started as the Centre of Forest Research Institute (FRI) in June 1987. However, the activities of establishing the institute were intensified with the issuing of formal office order no, 4-14/87-RT dated 13.04.1988 of ministry of Environment & Forest, New Delhi and the institute started working under the Indian Council of Forestry Research & Education (ICFRE). During this period the efforts concentered mainly on land procurement, occupation of private building and creating modest facilities of research, discussing and finalizing the modalities of recruitment, arranging seminars etc. During this period attempts were made to identify problems in arid zone forestry and a few preliminary trials were also initiated. However, the Institute of Arid Zone Forestry Research (IAZFR) was renamed as the Arid Forest Research Institute (AFRI) in April 1992.

The institute is headed by the director supported by a group coordinator (research) and coordinator (facilities). The institute has six divisions with well-equipped laboratories and technical manpower, namely:

=== Divisions ===
1. Forest Ecology Division
2. Forest Genetics and Tree Breeding Division
3. Forest Protection Division
4. Silviculture Division
5. Agroforestry & Extension Division

These divisions are well supported with the information technology cell, coordinator (facilities), accounts section, library-cum-information center and an extension wing.

The institute has a working strength of 133, which includes two conservators of forests, one deputy conservator of forests, 19 scientists, a controller, an assistant administrative officer, a Hindi officer, a librarian, 6 research officers, a range officer, and ministerial and technical staff.

Capacity building and research training

- Nursery, seed and VAM technologies for arid zone tree species.
- Forest mensuration and growth & yield modeling in plantations.
- Planting stock improvement, biotechnology and plant tissue culture.
- Afforestation of stress sites (Sand dunes, waterlogged areas, salt affected soils).
- Rain water harvesting and soil-moisture conservation.
- Site specific agroforestry models.

== Facilities ==
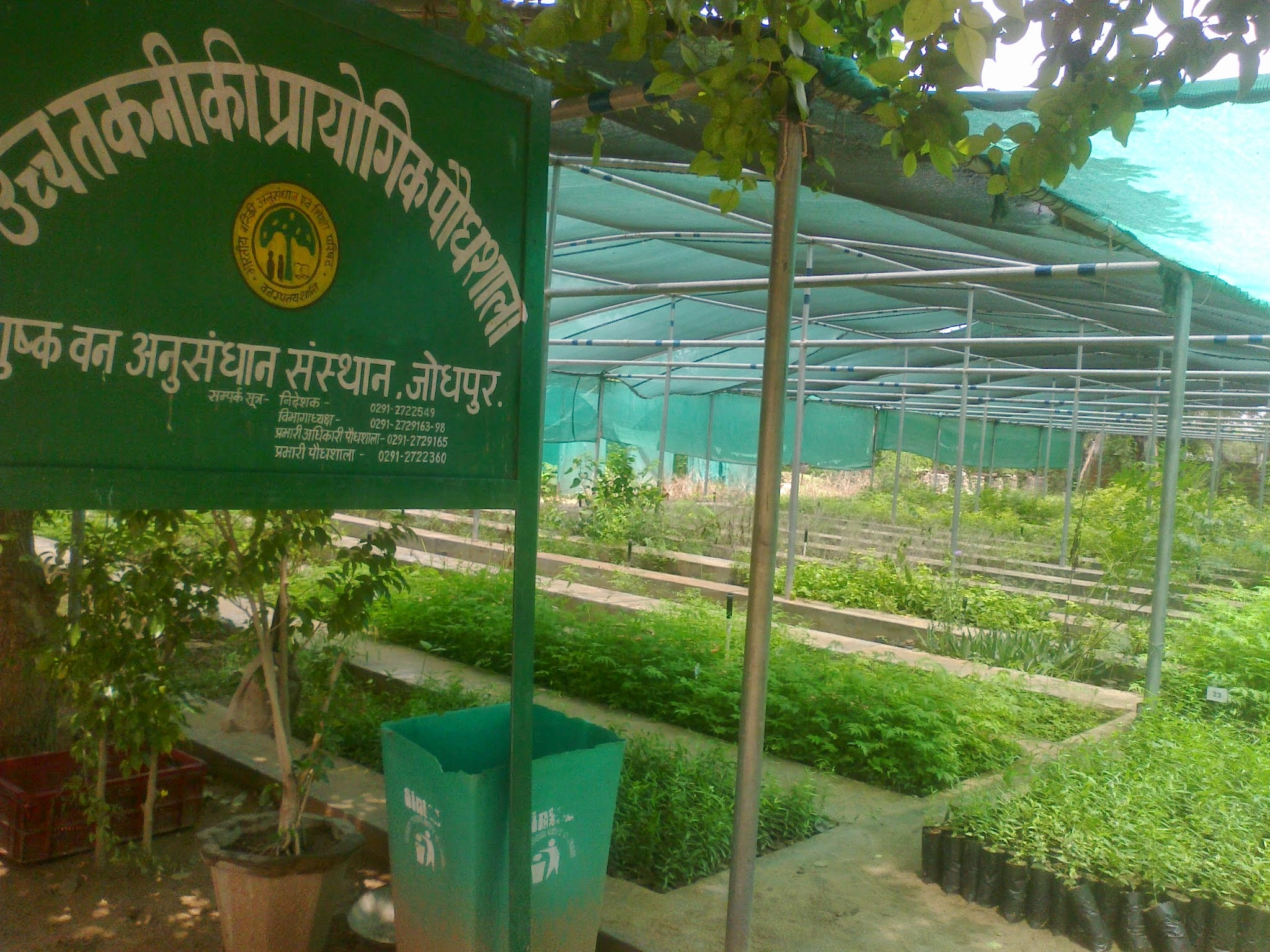
Model Nursery

IT Cell, Library, Model Nursery, GIS Lab, Community centre, Dispensary.

== Mandate of the institute ==
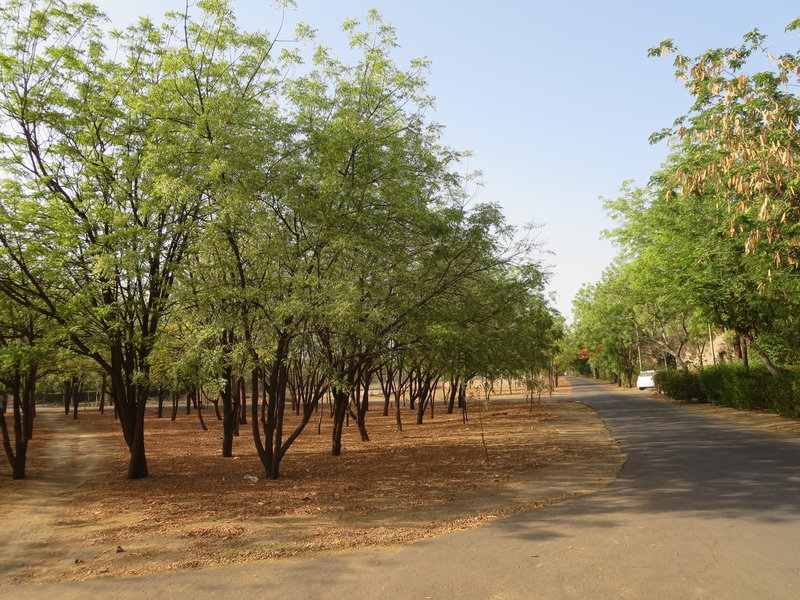
Azadirachta indica in main campus

Forestry research for conservation of biodiversity and enhancement of bio-productivity in Rajasthan, Gujarat, and Dadra and Nagar Haveli, with special emphasis on arid and semi-arid regions.

== Thrust areas ==
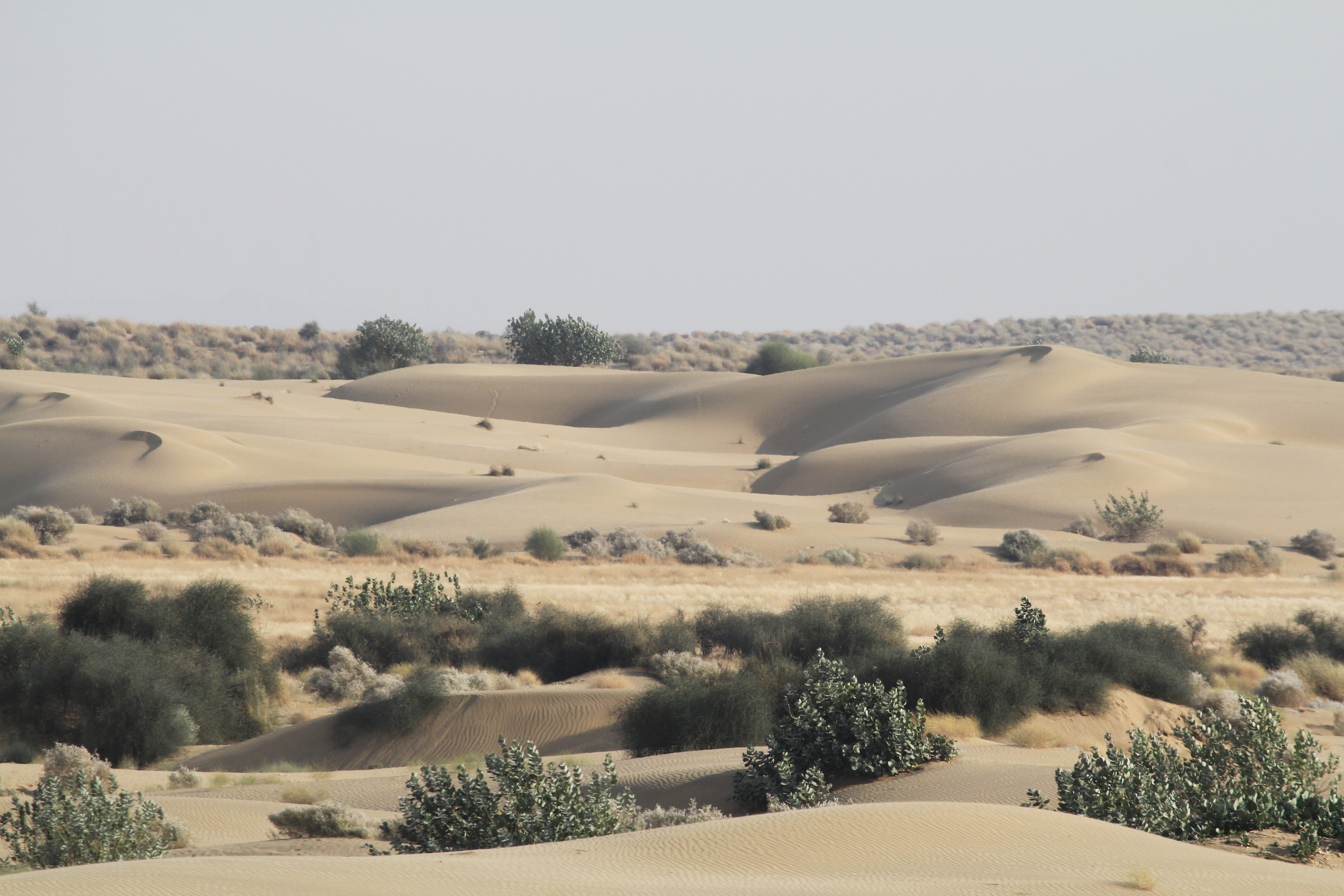
Sand dune in Rajasthan

- To develop techniques for rainwater harvesting in arid areas.
- To develop technology for afforestation on stress sites.
- Eco-stabilisation of desert areas with emphasis on sand dune fixation.
- To develop techniques for production of high-quality planting material.
- Provenance trial of important arid zone species.
- Studies on biofertilizer and biopesticide.
- Research on non-wood forest products of the arid zone.
- To vegetate the desert areas
- To reduce the water scarcity in desert areas
- Tree improvement through tissue culture & genetic engineering.

== See also ==
- AFRI Model Nursery
- Central Arid Zone Research Institute
- Forest Research Institute (India)
- Indian Council of Forestry Research and Education
- Ministry of Environment and Forests (India)
- Taanka
- Van Vigyan Kendra (VVK) Forest Science Centres
