= Ministry of Environment, Forest and Climate Change =

Government ministry of India

- Branch of Government of India

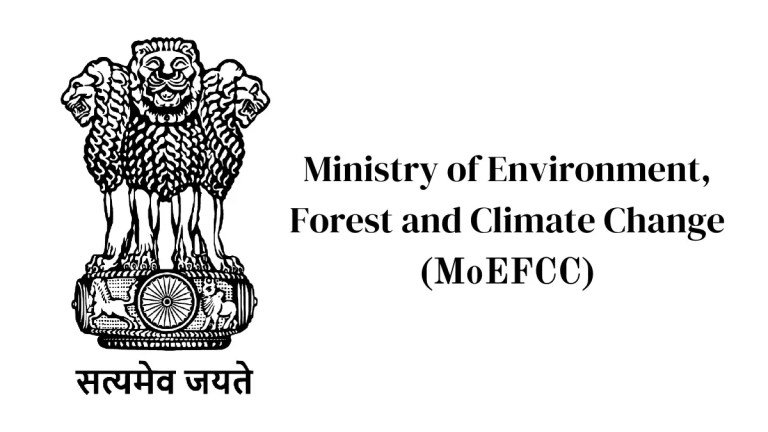
- Ministry of Environment, Forest and Climate Change

Agency overview
- Formed: 1985; 41 years ago
- Jurisdiction: Government of India
- Headquarters: Indira Paryavaran Bhawan, Jorbagh Road, New Delhi
- Annual budget: ₹3,759.46 crore (US$390 million) (2026–27 est.)
- Ministers responsible: Bhupender Yadav, Cabinet Minister; Kirti Vardhan Singh, Minister of State
- Agency executives: Narendra Bhooshan, IAS, Secretary (EF&CC); Jitender Kumar, IFS, Director General of Forests and Special Secretary
- Website: https://moef.gov.in/

The Ministry of Environment, Forest and Climate Change (MoEFCC) is an Indian government ministry. The ministry portfolio is currently held by Bhupender Yadav.

The ministry is responsible for planning, promoting, coordinating, and overseeing the implementation of environmental and forestry programmes in the country. The main activities undertaken by the ministry include conservation and survey of the flora of India and fauna of India, forests and other wilderness areas; prevention and control of pollution; Indian Himalayan Environment and its sustainable development; afforestation, and land degradation mitigation. It is responsible for the administration of the national parks of India.

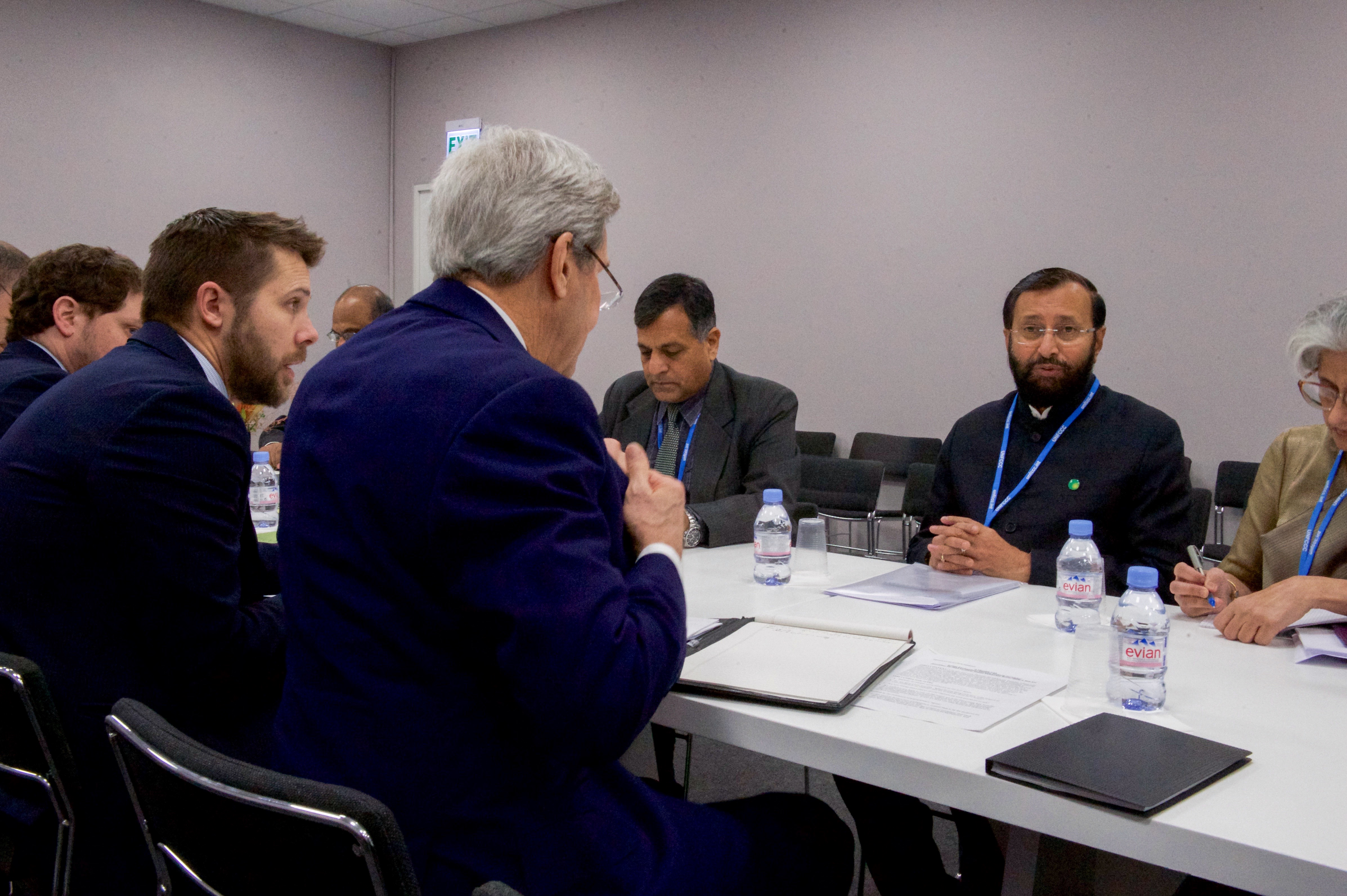
Prakash Javadekar meeting with US Secretary of State John Kerry at COP21 in Paris.

The Ministry of Environment, Forest and Climate Change is the cadre controlling authority of the Indian Forest Service (IFS), one of the three All India Services.

== History ==
Environmental debates were first introduced into the national political agenda during Indira Gandhi's first term as Prime Minister of India. The 4th Five-Year Plan (1969–74), for example, proclaimed "harmonious development [...] on the basis of a comprehensive appraisal of environmental issues." In 1977 (during the Emergency) Gandhi added Article 48A to the constitution stating that: "The State shall endeavour to protect and improve the environment and to safeguard the forests and wildlife of the country." The same decree transferred wildlife and forests from state list to concurrent list of the constitution, thus giving the central government the power to overrule state decisions on that matter. Such political and constitutional changes prepared the groundwork for the creation of a federal Department of Environment in 1980, turned into the Ministry of Environment and Forests in 1985. Although tackling climate change was already a responsibility of the ministry, its priority was raised when in May 2014 the ministry was renamed to the current title of Ministry of Environment, Forest and Climate Change.

== Administration ==
The forest administration is based on demarcation of states into Forest Divisions which consists of Forest Ranges. Forest Beats under Ranges are the smallest unit of administration hierarchy. Natural features on the field form the boundaries of each beat which has an average area of around 16 km square.

== Organisation ==
- Indian Forest Service (IFS)
- Authorities
  - Central Zoo Authority of India, New Delhi
  - National Biodiversity Authority, Chennai
  - National Tiger Conservation Authority, New Delhi
  - Wildlife Crime Control Bureau
- Subordinate offices
  - Andaman & Nicobar Islands Forest and Plantation Development Corporation (Public Sector Undertaking)
  - Botanical Survey of India (BSI), Kolkata
  - Central Pollution Control Board
  - Environmental Information System (ENVIS)
  - Odisha State Pollution Control Board
  - Delhi Pollution Control Committee
  - Directorate of Forest Education
  - Forest Survey of India
  - Indira Gandhi National Forest Academy
  - National Afforestation and Eco-Development Board
  - National Board of Wildlife
  - National Museum of Natural History (NMNH), New Delhi
  - National Zoological Park (NZP), New Delhi
  - Zoological Survey of India (ZSI), Kolkata
- Centres of excellence
  - Centre for Environment Education, Ahmedabad
  - C. P. R. Environmental Education Centre, Chennai
  - Centre for Animals and Environment, Bangalore
  - Centre of Excellence in Environmental Economics, Chennai
  - Foundation for Revitalisation of Local Health Traditions, Bangalore
  - Centre for Ecological Sciences, Bangalore
  - Centre for Environmental Management of Degraded Ecosystem, New Delhi
  - Centre for Mining Environment, Dhanbad
  - Sálim Ali Centre for Ornithology and Natural History (SACON), Coimbatore
  - Tropical Botanic Garden and Research Institute, Thiruvananthapuram
- Autonomous institutions
  - G. B.Pant National Institute of Himalayan Environment, Almora
  - Indian Institute of Forest Management, Bhopal
  - Indian Plywood Industries Research and Training Institute, Bengaluru
  - Indian Council of Forestry Research and Education (ICFRE), Dehradun
  - Wildlife Institute of India (WII), Dehradun

== Cabinet Ministers ==
- Note: I/C – Independent Charge

Portrait	Minister (Birth-Death) Constituency	Term of office			Political party	Ministry	Prime Minister
Portrait	Minister (Birth-Death) Constituency	From	To	Period	Political party	Ministry	Prime Minister
Minister of Environment and Forests
	Rajiv Gandhi (1944–1991); MP for Amethi (Prime Minister)	31 December 1984	22 October 1986	1 year, 295 days	Indian National Congress	Rajiv II	Rajiv Gandhi
	Bhajan Lal (1930–2011); Rajya Sabha MP for Haryana	22 October 1986	14 February 1988	1 year, 115 days	Indian National Congress	Rajiv II	Rajiv Gandhi
	Ziaur Rahman Ansari (1925–1992); MP for Unnao (Minister of State, I/C until 25 Jun 1988)	14 February 1988	2 December 1989	1 year, 291 days	Indian National Congress	Rajiv II	Rajiv Gandhi
	Vishwanath Pratap Singh (1931–2008); MP for Fatehpur (Prime Minister)	2 December 1989	23 April 1990	142 days	Janata Dal	Vishwanath	Vishwanath Pratap Singh
	Nilamani Routray (1920–2004); MP for Puri	23 April 1990	10 November 1990	201 days	Janata Dal	Vishwanath	Vishwanath Pratap Singh
	Maneka Gandhi (born 1956); MP for Pilibhit (Minister of State, I/C)	10 November 1990	21 June 1991	223 days	Samajwadi Janata Party (Rashtriya)	Chandra Shekhar	Chandra Shekhar
	Kamal Nath (born 1946); MP for Chhindwara (Minister of State, I/C)	21 June 1991	15 September 1995	4 years, 86 days	Indian National Congress	Rao	P. V. Narasimha Rao
	Rajesh Pilot (1945–2000); MP for Dausa (Minister of State, I/C)	15 September 1995	16 May 1996	244 days	Indian National Congress	Rao	P. V. Narasimha Rao
	Atal Bihari Vajpayee (1924–2018); MP for Lucknow (Prime Minister)	16 May 1996	1 June 1996	16 days	Bharatiya Janata Party	Vajpayee I	Atal Bihari Vajpayee
	H. D. Deve Gowda (born 1933); Unelected (Prime Minister)	1 June 1996	29 June 1996	28 days	Janata Dal	Deve Gowda	H. D. Deve Gowda
	Jai Narain Prasad Nishad (1930–2018); MP for Muzaffarpur (Minister of State, I/C)	29 June 1996	21 February 1997	237 days	Janata Dal	Deve Gowda	H. D. Deve Gowda
	Saifuddin Soz (born 1937); Rajya Sabha MP for Jammu and Kashmir	21 February 1997	19 March 1998	1 year, 26 days	Jammu and Kashmir National Conference	Deve Gowda	H. D. Deve Gowda
	Saifuddin Soz (born 1937); Rajya Sabha MP for Jammu and Kashmir	21 February 1997	19 March 1998	1 year, 26 days	Jammu and Kashmir National Conference	Gujral	Inder Kumar Gujral
	Suresh Prabhu (born 1953); MP for Rajapur	19 March 1998	13 October 1999	1 year, 208 days	Shiv Sena	Vajpayee II	Atal Bihari Vajpayee
	T. R. Baalu (born 1941); MP for Chennai South	13 October 1999	21 December 2003	4 years, 69 days	Dravida Munnetra Kazhagam	Vajpayee III	Atal Bihari Vajpayee
	Atal Bihari Vajpayee (1924–2018); MP for Lucknow (Prime Minister)	21 December 2003	9 January 2004	19 days	Bharatiya Janata Party	Vajpayee III	Atal Bihari Vajpayee
	Ramesh Bais (born 1947); MP for Raipur (Minister of State, I/C)	9 January 2004	22 May 2004	134 days	Bharatiya Janata Party	Vajpayee III	Atal Bihari Vajpayee
	A. Raja (born 1963); MP for Perambalur	23 May 2004	15 May 2007	2 years, 357 days	Dravida Munnetra Kazhagam	Manmohan I	Manmohan Singh
	Manmohan Singh (1932–2024); Rajya Sabha MP for Assam (Prime Minister)	15 May 2007	22 May 2009	2 years, 7 days	Indian National Congress	Manmohan I	Manmohan Singh
	Jairam Ramesh (born 1954); Rajya Sabha MP for Andhra Pradesh (Minister of State, I/C)	22 May 2009	12 July 2011	2 years, 51 days	Indian National Congress	Manmohan II	Manmohan Singh
	Jayanthi Natarajan (born 1954); Rajya Sabha MP for Tamil Nadu (Minister of State, I/C)	12 July 2011	21 December 2013	2 years, 162 days	Indian National Congress	Manmohan II	Manmohan Singh
	Veerappa Moily (born 1940); MP for Chikballapur	21 December 2013	26 May 2014	156 days	Indian National Congress	Manmohan II	Manmohan Singh
Minister of Environment, Forest and Climate Change
	Prakash Javadekar (born 1951); Rajya Sabha MP for Madhya Pradesh (Minister of State, I/C)	27 May 2014	5 July 2016	2 years, 39 days	Bharatiya Janata Party	Modi I	Narendra Modi
	Anil Madhav Dave (1956–2017); Rajya Sabha MP for Madhya Pradesh (Minister of State, I/C)	5 July 2016	18 May 2017 (died in office)	317 days	Bharatiya Janata Party	Modi I	Narendra Modi
	Harsh Vardhan (born 1954); MP for Chandni Chowk	18 May 2017	30 May 2019	2 years, 12 days	Bharatiya Janata Party	Modi I	Narendra Modi
	Prakash Javadekar (born 1951); Rajya Sabha MP for Maharashtra	31 May 2019	7 July 2021	2 years, 37 days	Bharatiya Janata Party	Modi II	Narendra Modi
	Bhupender Yadav (born 1969); Rajya Sabha MP for Rajasthan, till 2024; MP for Alwar, from 2024	7 July 2021	Incumbent	5 years, 115 days	Bharatiya Janata Party	Modi II	Narendra Modi
	Bhupender Yadav (born 1969); Rajya Sabha MP for Rajasthan, till 2024; MP for Alwar, from 2024	7 July 2021	Incumbent	5 years, 115 days	Bharatiya Janata Party	Modi III	Narendra Modi

== Ministers of State ==
Portrait	Minister (Birth-Death) Constituency	Term of office			Political party	Ministry	Prime Minister
Portrait	Minister (Birth-Death) Constituency	From	To	Period	Political party	Ministry	Prime Minister
Minister of State for Environment and Forests
	Vir Sen; MP for Khurja	31 December 1984	25 September 1985	268 days	Indian National Congress	Rajiv II	Rajiv Gandhi
	Ziaur Rahman Ansari (1925–1992); MP for Unnao	25 September 1985	14 February 1988	2 years, 142 days	Indian National Congress	Rajiv II	Rajiv Gandhi
	Sumati Oraon (born 1935); MP for Lohardaga	4 July 1989	2 December 1989	151 days	Indian National Congress	Rajiv II	Rajiv Gandhi
	Maneka Gandhi (born 1956); MP for Pilibhit	6 December 1989	6 November 1990	335 days	Janata Dal	Vishwanath	Vishwanath Pratap Singh
	Jai Narain Prasad Nishad (1930–2018); MP for Muzaffarpur	1 June 1996	29 June 1996	28 days	Janata Dal	Deve Gowda	H. D. Deve Gowda
	Babulal Marandi (born 1958); MP for Dumka	19 March 1998	7 November 2000	2 years, 233 days	Bharatiya Janata Party	Vajpayee II	Atal Bihari Vajpayee
	Babulal Marandi (born 1958); MP for Dumka	19 March 1998	7 November 2000	2 years, 233 days	Bharatiya Janata Party	Vajpayee III	Atal Bihari Vajpayee
	Dilip Singh Judeo (1949–2013); MP for Chhattisgarh (Rajya Sabha)	29 January 2003	17 November 2003	292 days	Bharatiya Janata Party	Vajpayee III	Atal Bihari Vajpayee
	Namo Narain Meena (born 1943); MP for Sawai Madhopur	23 May 2004	22 May 2009	4 years, 364 days	Indian National Congress	Manmohan I	Manmohan Singh
	S. Regupathy (born 1950); MP for Pudukkottai	15 May 2007	22 May 2009	2 years, 7 days	Dravida Munnetra Kazhagam	Manmohan I	Manmohan Singh
Minister of State for Environment, Forest and Climate Change
	Mahesh Sharma (born 1959); MP for Gautam Buddh Nagar	3 September 2017	30 May 2019	1 year, 269 days	Bharatiya Janata Party	Modi I	Narendra Modi
	Babul Supriyo (born 1970); MP for Asansol	31 May 2019	7 July 2021	2 years, 37 days	Bharatiya Janata Party	Modi II	Narendra Modi
	Ashwini Kumar Choubey (born 1953); MP for Buxar	7 July 2021	9 June 2024	2 years, 338 days	Bharatiya Janata Party	Modi II	Narendra Modi
	Kirti Vardhan Singh (born 1966); MP for Gonda	10 June 2024	Incumbent	2 years, 142 days	Bharatiya Janata Party	Modi III	Narendra Modi

== Initiatives ==
In August 2019 Ministry of Environment released the Draft National Resource Efficiency Policy. It is a set of guidelines which envisions a future with environmentally sustainable and equitable economic growth. The policy is guided by principle of reduction in primary resource consumption; creation of higher value with less material through resource efficient circular approach; waste minimization; material security and creation of employment opportunities and business model beneficial to cause of environment protection and restoration. It was based on the report of NITI Aayog and European Union titled, The strategy on resource efficiency. The policy seeks to set up a National Resource Efficiency Authority with core working group housed in the Ministry. It also plans to offer tax benefits on recycled materials and soft loans to set up waste disposal and material recovery facilities.

As of 8 December 2021, some states have received more than Rupees 47,000 crore for afforestation. The states are directed to channel this amount as compensatory afforestation which shall be used for plantations, assisted natural forest regeneration, forest fire-prevention, pest and disease control in forest, and expedite soil and moisture conservation works.

== See also ==
- Fauna of India
- Wildlife of India
- Environment of India
- Wildlife Institute of India
- Forest Research Institute (India)
- Arid Forest Research Institute
- Van Vigyan Kendra (VVK) (Forest Science Centres)
- List of forest research institutes in India
- Indian Council of Forestry Research and Education
- Laboratory for the Conservation of Endangered Species
- List of Environment and Forest Research Institutes in India* Forest Research Institute (India)
