= Van Vigyan Kendra =

Van Vigyan Kendra (VVK) or Forest Science Centres (FSC) has been established by Indian Council of Forestry Research and Education (ICFRE) of the Ministry of Environment and Forests, Govt. of India. It intends to help disseminate various technologies developed by farmers, forest based industries and forest research institutes.

== Functions ==
The Van Vigyan Kendra caters to the needs of field research of silviculture, tree improvement, soil & water conservation techniques, and afforestation techniques for saline land, techniques for forestry extension, organic farming and composting techniques, sustainable land-use systems and introduction and evaluation of both timber and non-timber species.

There will be emphasis on developing superior planting material to enhance the productivity of Seedlings, which will aid the people associated with forestry and agriculture.

A number of trainings were provided on various themes including Awareness programme on Forestry Research and its utilization and protection of forests.

As of 17 November 2021, a total of 15 people have been selected to undergo a certificate training course on forest fire management under the Department of Environment & Forest, with the guidance of the officers of Arunachal Pradesh Forest Corporation Ltd (APFCL). Trainers and experts from various institutions of the state, including those from the Department of Forest Research Institute, NERIST, Forest department, APFC Ltd, Van Vigyan Kendra (VVK) and others will impart training on the subject.

== See also ==
- Chipko movement
- Indian Council of Forestry Research and Education (ICFRE)
- Ministry of Environment and Forests (India)
- Social forestry in India
- Krishi Vigyan Kendra (KVK) Kannur (Agriculture Science Centre)
- List of forest research institutes in India
- Rain Forest Research Institute
