= Hari Singh (administrator) =

Indian civil servant (1910–2003)

Hari Singh MBE

Inspector General of Forests (India)
- In office 1964–1969

Personal details
- Born: 1910
- Died: 2003 (aged 92–93)
- Education: University of Edinburgh (Forestry)
- Known for: Creation of the Indian Forest Service (1966); Introduction of Social Forestry in India
- Awards: Member of the Order of the British Empire (MBE)

Hari Singh (1910–2003) was an Indian forestry administrator who served as the Inspector General of Forests of India from 1964 to 1969. He played a foundational role in the country's environmental governance, most notably overseeing the reconstitution of the Indian Forest Service (IFS) into an All India Service in 1966. His tenure emphasized professionalized, scientific forest management, balancing post-independence industrial demands with sustainable ecological practices.

== Early life and education ==
Born in 1910 in British India, Singh's formative years coincided with the imperial era's emphasis on disciplined resource control. He studied forestry in Edinburgh before returning to India, where he underwent probationary training at the Imperial Forest College in Dehradun. His specialized instruction emphasized practical skills, including silviculture, ecological assessment, timber valuation, and surveying techniques, grounding him in the principles of scientific forestry established by pioneers like Dietrich Brandis.

== Early career and provincial forestry ==
Recruited into the Imperial Forest Service during the early 1930s through a competitive, merit-based process, Singh began his career as a forest officer in the Bombay Presidency. He subsequently undertook provincial assignments in regions such as Punjab, where he managed resources amid challenges like habitat loss and poaching. He focused on combating overexploitation through regulated hunting, enhanced patrol systems, and community engagement. In 1957, he detailed his strategies for wildlife preservation and sustained timber yields in an article published in The Indian Forester.

For his service in forest administration prior to Indian independence, the British Government appointed him a Member of the Order of the British Empire (MBE). On May 1, 1960, Singh was appointed Chief Conservator of Forests for Gujarat State, where he prioritized administrative efficiency and insulated operations from ad hoc political directives during a period of post-independence consolidation.

== Inspector General of Forests (1964–1969) ==
Singh assumed the office of Inspector General of Forests in 1964. India was facing accelerating industrialization under the Third and Fourth Five-Year Plans, which heightened timber demands and localized deforestation. Singh addressed these pressures by centralizing oversight and advocating for empirical, data-driven management.

=== Reconstitution of the Indian Forest Service ===
Singh’s most significant administrative legacy was his successful advocacy for a unified national forestry cadre. He argued that the decentralized provincial structures were fragmented and vulnerable to local political pressures. Under his leadership, the Indian Forest Service was reconstituted and formalized under the All India Services Act, 1951. Notified on September 1, 1966, the IFS became the third All-India Service alongside the Indian Administrative Service (IAS) and the Indian Police Service (IPS). The reform established merit-based recruitment through the Union Public Service Commission (UPSC) and standardized training at the Forest Research Institute.

=== Policy reforms and sustainable management ===
Singh reoriented forest plans toward industrial applications while ensuring regeneration. His notable policy contributions included:

The Hari Singh Committee (1967): As chair of the Committee on Tribal Economy in Forest Areas, he recommended eliminating exploitative intermediaries in the timber trade. The committee proposed establishing Forest Labourers’ Co-operative Societies to engage local indigenous communities in afforestation, harvesting, and minor forest produce collection.

Social forestry: He introduced the concept of "social forestry" to India to preserve local greenery, provide firewood, and prevent soil erosion.

Industrial and development schemes: He formulated the "Quick Growing Species" scheme to sustain yields for industries like paper mills and railways. He also initiated two major UNDP projects in India: the Pre-investment Survey of Forest Resources and the Logging Training Centre Project.

Legislative advocacy: Singh was instrumental in efforts that eventually led to the 42nd Amendment of the Constitution, which transferred forestry to the concurrent list, allowing for greater federal oversight.

== Advisory roles and international engagement ==
Singh represented India on numerous national and international forestry bodies. He served as Chairman of the IX Commonwealth Forestry Conference in January 1968, where delegates recognized his effective moderation in revitalizing the conference's focus on global wood trends and economic forestry.

His other international leadership roles included serving as Chairman of the Food and Agriculture Organization (FAO) Committee on Range Forest Management, Chairman of the Teak Sub-Commission, Chairman of the Technical Committee on Forestry and Forest Products (1965), and Vice-Chairman of the FAO Committee on Forest Development in the Tropics. He also participated in the Sixth World Forestry Congress in 1966.

In 1970, following his retirement, the Government of India appointed him to the National Commission on Agriculture. Contributing heavily to the commission's 1976 report (Part IX on Forestry), Singh advocated for integrating forest management with agricultural objectives, emphasizing long-term ecological sustainability over the politically driven expansion of arable land.

== Legacy and later life ==
Singh's structured administration is credited with slowing India's rate of deforestation between 1960 and 1980 by introducing professional oversight and improving legal frameworks against illegal logging. After retiring from the civil service in 1969, he served as a Professor Emeritus at the Forest Research Institute and College for a five-year term, and later as the Managing Director of the Newsprint Paper and Pulp Mills in Nepanagar, Madhya Pradesh.

His contributions were commemorated during his birth centenary in 2010 with the release of a biographical book, Hari Singh: A Life Sketch, and the establishment of the Hari Singh Fellowship at the Indira Gandhi National Forest Academy to honour outstanding IFS probationers.

Singh was married and had at least one son, Dr. Subir Hari Singh. He passed away in 2003 at the age of 93.
