= Ananganadi =

- village
- Location in Kerala, India Ananganadi (India)
- Coordinates: 10°50′0″N 76°20′0″E
- Country: India
- State: Kerala
- District: Palakkad

Population (2001)
  - Total: 22,078

Languages
  - Official: Malayalam, English
- Time zone: UTC+5:30 (IST)
- PIN: 6XXXXX
- Vehicle registration: KL-

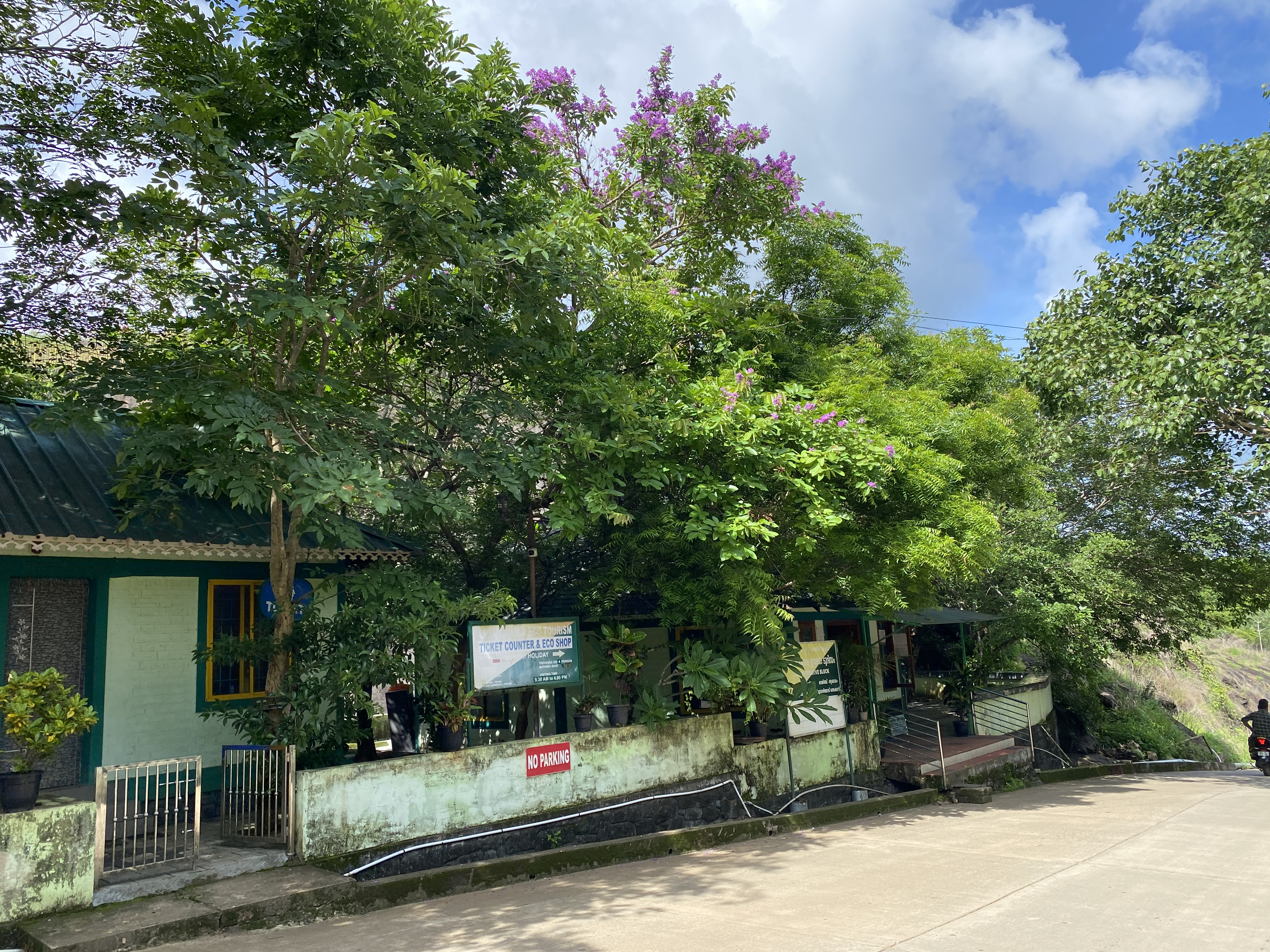
Ananganmala Eco Tourism

Ananganadi is a village in Palakkad district in the state of Kerala, India. Ananganadi is located equidistant from the towns of Ottapalam to the south and Cherpulassery to its north, both about 10 km from Ananganadi. The village of Vaniyamkulam lies 5 km roughly to the southwest.

It is nestled under the Anangan hills, hence the name Ananganadi. The Anangan hills, popularly known as Ananganmala, are 2500 acres of rocky formation interspersed with lush green forests, with a variety of local wildlife. It stretches north–south for approximately 20 km and at its highest point stands at about 1200 metres. The Anangan hills has an ecotourism centre run by the Kerala Forest Department.

The Cherambetta Bhagavathy temple and the Pattarkonam Shiva temple are two very old temples in Ananganadi village.

The Ananganadi Highschool founded in 1951 is the oldest and the only high school in the village.

Ananganadi has its own gram panchayat and forms a part of the Ottappalam taluk. The Government Seed Farm located in Pathamkullam produces foundation paddy seeds.

== Demographics ==
As of 2001 India census, Ananganadi had a population of 22,078 with 10,242 males and 11,836 females. The latest census figures (2011) show that the village had a population of 24,445 in which the registered males were 11,386 and females 13,059.
