= Operation Shikkar =

Kerala Forest Department anti ivory smuggling and poaching operation

- Date: 2015–2017
- Location: Kerala, India
- Type: Law enforcement operation
- Cause: Combat illegal ivory smuggling and poaching
- Organised by: Kerala Forest Department, Wildlife Trust of India
- Outcome: Arrest of 72 individuals; seizure of 487 kg of ivory
- Arrests: 72

Operation Shikkar was an extensive enforcement and investigation initiative undertaken by the Kerala Forest Department between 2015 and 2017, aimed at dismantling a widespread network involved in illegal ivory smuggling and the poaching of elephants in India. This operation marked one of the most significant efforts against wildlife crime in the country.

== Background ==
The operation was initiated in response to increasing concerns over elephant poaching and ivory smuggling in the Malayattoor forest division of Ernakulam district, Kerala. Intelligence reports suggested a well-organized syndicate that exploited local wildlife resources and operated across various states in India.

== Key officers involved ==
=== Manu Sathyan ===
Manu Sathyan, serving as the Divisional Forest Officer (DFO) of the Kerala Forest Department, played a pivotal role in the operation.

=== Jose Louies ===
Jose Louies, an IT engineer and wildlife enthusiast from Kerala, significantly contributed to the operation as a technical analyst and representative of the Wildlife Trust of India (WTI).

=== Dr. Amit Mallick ===
Dr. Amit Mallick, associated with the Indian Forest Service, was instrumental in assembling a task force to swiftly apprehend the culprits involved in the operation.

== Execution ==
The operation involved coordination between multiple agencies, including the Kerala Forest Department, local police, and conservation organizations. Undercover operations, surveillance, and analysis of communication networks were key strategies employed to identify and arrest individuals involved in the illegal ivory trade.

== Outcomes ==
The operation led to the arrest of 72 individuals, including poachers, government officials, ivory carvers, and dealers. Significant quantities of ivory were seized, highlighting the extensive network and methods used by poachers and smugglers.

== Impact ==
"Operation Shikkar" raised public awareness about the threats to elephant populations and the importance of protecting these keystone species. It underscored the need for stricter enforcement of wildlife protection laws and enhanced international cooperation to prevent illegal wildlife trade.

== In popular culture ==
The significant impact of "Operation Shikkar" was dramatized in the web series Poacher, available on Amazon Prime Video. The series is inspired by the real-life events of the operation and portrays the collaborative efforts to dismantle an illegal ivory smuggling racket.
