= Pania Wildlife Sanctuary =

Wildlife Protected areas of India

- IUCN category IV (habitat/species management area)
- Location within Gujarat Location within India
- Interactive map of Pania Wildlife Sanctuary
- Location: Amreli District, Gujarat, India
- Coordinates: 21.250°N 70.825°E
- Established: June 1989
- Governing body: Gujarat Forest Department
- Website: Official Website

Pania Wildlife Sanctuary is a protected area located in the Amreli District of Gujarat, India. Situated within the broader Gir forest ecosystem, it plays a crucial role in conserving the biodiversity of the region, including the endangered Asiatic lion (Panthera leo persica).

== Overview ==
Established to safeguard the diverse flora and fauna native to Gujarat's dry deciduous forests, Pania Wildlife Sanctuary acts as both a buffer and a wildlife corridor, enabling the free movement of species within the Gir forest.

== Flora and Fauna ==
The sanctuary hosts an array of species, including the Asiatic lion, leopards, hyenas, as well as several deer and antelope species. It is also a haven for bird watchers, offering sightings of numerous bird species endemic to the area.

== Conservation Efforts ==
Managed by the Forest Department of Gujarat, the sanctuary is the focus of various conservation initiatives aimed at preserving its unique ecosystem. These include measures to combat poaching, habitat restoration projects, and programs designed to foster harmony between the local human populations and wildlife.

== Tourism ==
Beyond its conservation value, Pania Wildlife Sanctuary offers eco-tourism experiences that allow visitors to immerse themselves in its natural beauty and observe its wildlife in their natural habitat, thus promoting conservation awareness and supporting the local economy.

== See also ==
- Gir Forest National Park
- Wildlife of India
- Conservation in India
