= Kerala Forest Department =

Indian law enforcement agency in Kerala

Kerala Forest
- image has rationale=yes Emblem of Kerala Forest
- Abbreviation: KF
- Motto: സുരക്ഷിത ഭാവ്യാർത്ഥം (सुरक्षित भाव्यर्थम्); For Secure Future

Agency overview
- Formed: November 1, 1956; 70 years ago
- Annual budget: ₹1,153.42 crore (US$120 million) (2026–27, revised)

Jurisdictional structure
- Operations jurisdiction: Kerala, IN
- Jurisdiction of Kerala Forest
- Area: 15,008.13 sq mi (38,870.88 km^{2})
- Population: 34,630,192
- Legal jurisdiction: As per operations jurisdiction
- Governing body: Forest and Wildlife Department, Government of Kerala
- Constituting instrument: Indian Forest Act, 1927, Wildlife Protection Act, 1972, Kerala Forest Act, 1961, Environment Protection Act, 1986, Biological Diversity Act, 2002

Operational structure
- Headquarters: FHQ,Vazhuthacaud, Kerala
- Elected officer responsible: Shibu Baby John, Cabinet Minister
- Agency executive: Rajesh Ravindran, IFS, Principal Chief Conservator of Forests & Head of The Forest Force

Website
- forest.kerala.gov.in

Kerala Forest is a government department of the State of Keralam, India, responsible for the protection, conservation, enforcement, and sustainable management of forests, wildlife, biodiversity, and the natural environment. It functions through a structured forest protection and enforcement force supported by a hierarchical administrative and management system led by Indian Forest Service (IFS) officers. The department plays a vital role in safeguarding forest ecosystems, protecting wildlife and natural habitats, preventing forest offences, combating illegal activities, maintaining ecological balance, and preserving the state's natural resources. Its responsibilities also include disaster prevention, preparedness, risk reduction, and response, particularly in forested and ecologically sensitive areas, where it undertakes field operations and supports emergency interventions during natural disasters. Beyond forest territories, the department implements social forestry programmes across the state to increase tree cover, promote greenery, encourage community participation in conservation, and foster environmental awareness. Its frontline personnel carry out forest protection, patrolling, wildlife protection, enforcement, and emergency operations, while senior officers oversee administration, operational coordination, forest management, and conservation programmes. The department is responsible for the protection and management of approximately 11,524.149 km² of forest land, constituting about 29.65% of Kerala's total geographical area.

Its headquarters is located at Vanalakshmi, Vazhuthacaud, Thiruvananthapuram, Kerala. The department is headed by the Principal Chief Conservator of Forests and Head of Forest Force (PCCF & HoFF).

== Organisational Structure ==
The Kerala Forest Department functions under the political leadership of the Minister for Forest , who provides policy direction and governmental oversight. The Secretariat-level administrative functions of the department are coordinated by the Secretary to Government (Forest), a senior Indian Administrative Service (IAS) officer, who advises and assists the Minister on policy matters, departmental administration, governance, and coordination. The Secretary oversees the functioning of the departmental secretariat, including the processing of government matters, administrative decisions, policy coordination, and implementation of government directives, with the support of Additional Secretaries, Joint Secretaries, Deputy Secretaries, Under Secretaries, and the Secretariat Sections. This administrative structure facilitates the coordination of departmental affairs, formulation of policies, and execution of government decisions relating to forests, wildlife, and environmental conservation.

The Kerala Forests Department is a state-level forest protection, wildlife conservation, and enforcement organisation responsible for the protection, management, and sustainable development of forest resources and natural ecosystems across Kerala. The department functions through a hierarchical command and administrative structure headed by the Principal Chief Conservator of Forests and Head of Forest Force (PCCF & HoFF), supported by senior forest officers, specialised wings, territorial field formations, and frontline forest protection personnel. Its operational network is responsible for forest protection, wildlife conservation, enforcement of forest laws, prevention of illegal activities, forest surveillance, patrolling, habitat management, and conservation of biodiversity.

=== Forest Headquarters ===
The department is headed by the Principal Chief Conservator of Forests and Head of Forest Force (PCCF & HoFF), who serves as the head of the forest administration and protection force in Kerala. The Head of Forest Force is assisted by senior officers, including Principal Chief Conservators of Forests (PCCF), Additional Principal Chief Conservators of Forests (APCCF), Chief Conservators of Forests (CCF), Conservators of Forests (CF), and Deputy Conservators of Forests (DCF), who oversee territorial, specialised, administrative, enforcement, conservation, and operational functions throughout the state.

The department maintains a structured field organisation responsible for protecting forest territories, wildlife habitats, protected areas, and forest resources. Its field personnel undertake patrols, surveillance, enforcement operations, prevention of forest offences, anti-poaching activities, and response to forest-related emergencies. The operational network is supported by supervisory officers and specialised personnel responsible for coordinating field deployment, mobility, intelligence, protection, and conservation activities.

The department's territorial field administration is organised through forest divisions, forest range offices, forest stations, forest sections, and forest outposts, forming a network of field establishments for forest protection, surveillance, enforcement, and management. The field formations operate under the supervision of designated forest officers and frontline personnel assigned to their respective jurisdictions.

=== Departmental Wings ===
The department operates through territorial, specialised, conservation, enforcement, and administrative wings, each entrusted with specific responsibilities relating to forest management, protection, wildlife conservation, and departmental administration.

- Forest Management Wing: Responsible for territorial forest management, protection of forest areas, supervision of field formations, implementation of forest management programmes, and enforcement of forest laws and regulations.
- Wildlife Wing: Responsible for wildlife conservation, habitat protection, management of wildlife sanctuaries and other protected areas, prevention of wildlife offences, and coordination of wildlife protection operations.
- Finance and Budget Wing: Responsible for financial administration, budget preparation, expenditure management, financial planning, and coordination of departmental financial matters.
- Administration Wing: Responsible for establishment matters, personnel administration, departmental administration, organisational coordination, and general administrative functions.
- Vigilance and Forest Intelligence Wing: Responsible for vigilance activities, forest intelligence, monitoring of forest-related offences, information gathering, and supporting enforcement operations against illegal activities affecting forests and wildlife.
- Social Forestry Wing: Responsible for social forestry, afforestation, tree planting, rural and urban greening, community-based forestry initiatives, environmental awareness, and increasing tree cover outside designated forest areas. The wing operates through a network of state-level, circle-level, district-level, and taluk-level offices across Kerala, coordinating afforestation programmes, seedling distribution, tree planting initiatives, community participation, and environmental awareness activities.
- Eco-Development and Tribal Welfare Wing: Responsible for eco-development programmes, community participation in forest conservation, tribal welfare initiatives, and sustainable livelihood programmes for forest-dependent communities.
- Ecologically Fragile Land (EFL) Wing: Responsible for matters relating to ecologically fragile lands, including their protection, conservation, management, and restoration.
- Special Afforestation and Nodal Office Wing: Coordinates specialised afforestation programmes, designated conservation projects, and nodal departmental initiatives.
- Information Technology Wing: Responsible for information technology systems, digital administration, technological integration, information management, and modernisation of departmental operations.
- Human Resources Wing: Responsible for workforce administration, personnel management, establishment matters, staffing coordination, and human resource-related functions.

=== Territorial Field Office Structure ===
The Kerala Forests and Wildlife Department operates through a hierarchical administrative and territorial field office network extending from the state headquarters to frontline forest establishments. The overall organisational framework comprises state-level, regional-level, circle-level, division-level, range-level, forest station-level, and section-level offices, facilitating administration, supervision, coordination, forest protection, enforcement, wildlife conservation, and management of forest territories throughout Kerala.

- State Level: The state headquarters serves as the apex administrative and operational coordination centre of the department, responsible for statewide forest administration, policy implementation, supervision, planning, and coordination of departmental activities.
- Regional Level: Regional offices coordinate departmental administration, forest management, protection activities, and operational functions across designated regional jurisdictions.
- Circle Level: Forest circles oversee forest divisions within their respective jurisdictions and coordinate forest management, conservation, protection, administrative, and enforcement activities.
- Division Level: Forest divisions serve as principal territorial administrative units responsible for forest management, protection, conservation, and administration within their respective jurisdictions.
- Range Level: Forest ranges function as territorial subdivisions of forest divisions, responsible for supervising forest protection, patrol operations, enforcement activities, conservation programmes, and field personnel.
- Forest Station Level: Forest stations serve as field-level operational establishments coordinating frontline forest protection, surveillance, patrolling, enforcement, and departmental activities within designated areas.
- Section Level: Forest sections constitute subordinate field units responsible for monitoring forest territories, conducting patrols, supervising field duties, and implementing forest protection and conservation activities.

The territorial field network is supported by frontline forest protection personnel and field establishments, including forest outposts where established, to facilitate patrolling, surveillance, prevention of forest offences, protection of wildlife and forest resources, and response to forest-related incidents.

=== Hierarchy ===
The department maintains a hierarchical structure of forest officers, supervisory personnel, enforcement staff, and frontline protection personnel responsible for command, administration, field supervision, forest protection, wildlife conservation, and enforcement operations.

- Principal Chief Conservator of Forests and Head of Forest Force (PCCF & HoFF)
- Principal Chief Conservator of Forests (PCCF)
- Additional Principal Chief Conservator of Forests (APCCF)
- Chief Conservator of Forests (CCF)
- Conservator of Forests (CF)
- Divisional Forest Officer (DFO) / Deputy Conservator of Forests (DCF) / Wildlife Warden
- Assistant Conservator of Forests (ACF)
- Range Forest Officer (RFO)
- Deputy Range Forest Officer (Dy. RFO)
- Section Forest Officer (SFO)
- Beat Forest Officer (BFO)
- Forest Drivers
- Forest Beat Assistant (FBA)

=== Field Operations and Enforcement ===
The department's field force is responsible for frontline forest protection, enforcement of forest laws, wildlife protection, surveillance, and conservation operations throughout its territorial jurisdiction. Field personnel conduct regular patrols, monitoring, preventive enforcement, and operational activities to protect forest areas from illegal logging, encroachment, poaching, wildlife trafficking, forest fires, and other forest-related offences.

Field operations are carried out through the territorial field office network under the supervision of designated officers, with specialised personnel and mobility units supporting patrols, surveillance, enforcement, operational deployment, and response to forest-related emergencies. The field force also undertakes preventive measures, conservation activities, habitat protection, and emergency interventions in forested and ecologically sensitive areas.

The department also contributes to disaster preparedness, risk reduction, prevention, and response, particularly in forest landscapes and ecologically vulnerable areas, and supports coordinated field operations during natural disasters and other emergencies.

=== Social Forestry ===
The Social Forestry Wing of the Kerala Forest Department extends forestry and environmental conservation activities beyond designated forest areas through afforestation, tree planting, urban and rural greening, community participation, and environmental awareness programmes. It operates through a statewide network of offices at the state, circle, district, and taluk levels across Kerala, facilitating the administration, coordination, and implementation of social forestry programmes throughout the state.

The wing undertakes seedling production and distribution, roadside and institutional tree planting, community forestry initiatives, school-based environmental programmes, and other activities aimed at increasing tree cover and promoting public participation in environmental conservation.

== Ranks and Insignia ==
The Kerala Forest Department has three categories of officers: Indian Forest Service (IFS), Kerala Forest Service (KFS), and Kerala Forest Subordinate Service.

The IFS cadre includes officers from Assistant Conservator of Forests (ACF) to Principal Chief Conservator of Forests (PCCF). These are Group A gazetted officers appointed through the Union Public Service Commission. The Kerala Forest Service (KFS) comprises Deputy Conservators of Forests (Non-IFS), Assistant Conservators of Forests (Non-IFS), and Range Forest Officers. The Kerala Forest Subordinate Service includes Deputy Range Forest Officers, Section Forest Officers, Beat Forest Officers, and Forest Drivers.

Uniform (Khaki) is mandatory only for field-level officers (Range Forest Officers and below); senior officers ACF and above do not have a prescribed uniform.

No.	Rank	Shoulder insignia
1	Range Forest Officer (RFO)	
2	Deputy Range Forest Officer (Dy.RFO)	
3	Section Forest Officer (SFO)	
4	Beat Forest Officer (BFO) / Driver (DVR)	

== Responsibilities ==
- Biodiversity conservation
- Forest protection and territorial management
- Forest law enforcement and prevention of forest offences
- Forest patrolling, surveillance, and enforcement operations
- Wildlife management, conservation, and research
- Anti-poaching operations and wildlife crime prevention
- Forest development and sustainable forest management
- Forest restoration and ecosystem conservation
- Social forestry and afforestation
- Forest vigilance, intelligence, and monitoring
- Forest fire prevention, preparedness, and control
- Protection of forest land against encroachment and illegal exploitation
- Protected area and wildlife habitat management
- Eco-development and tribal welfare
- Community participation in forest and wildlife conservation
- Planning, research, and environmental monitoring
- Rehabilitation and special afforestation programmes
- Climate change mitigation and adaptation
- Forest disaster management and emergency response
- Environmental education and awareness
- Human resource development

== See also ==
- Department of Environment, Government of Kerala
- Indian Council of Forestry Research and Education
- Van Vigyan Kendra - Forest Science Centers
- Operation Shikkar - Combat illegal ivory smuggling and poaching
