= Vaniyamkulam =

- Town
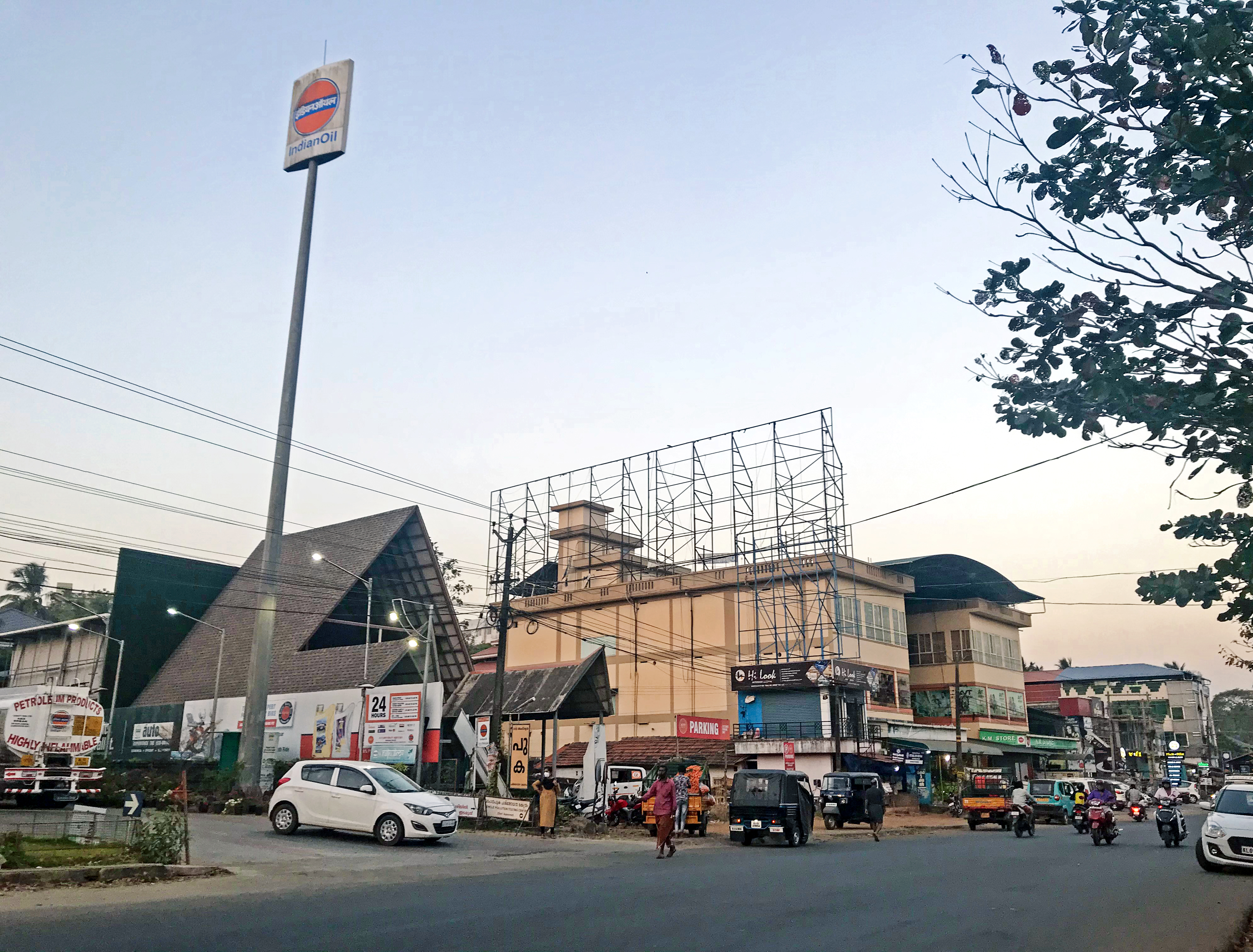
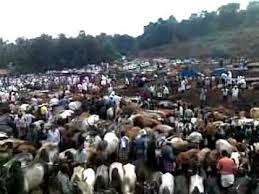
- Vaniyamkulam town and Livestock trade grounds

- Location in Kerala, India
- Coordinates: 10.7828°N 76.3269°E
- Country: India
- State: Kerala
- District: Palakkad
- Taluk: Ottapalam

Government
  - Type: Panchayat Raj
  - Body: Vaniyamkulam Grama Panchayat

Area
  - Total: 20.04 km^{2} (7.74 sq mi)

Population (2011)
  - Total: 16,085
  - Density: 802.6/km^{2} (2,079/sq mi)

Languages
  - Official: Malayalam, English
- Time zone: UTC+5:30 (IST)
- PIN: 679522
- Vehicle registration: KL-51

Vaniyamkulam is a census town and grama panchayat in Palakkad district in the Indian state of Kerala. It consists of revenue villages Vaniyamkulam-I and Vaniyamkulam-II. The name is said to be derived from Vaniyan, connected with a trading community.

== History ==
During Chera Perumals, this place was under Chera Kingdom, under Nedunganad. This is close to Kothakursi, a place where Chera rulers first settled in Malabar area. Kotha is the pet name of Chera Rulers. Although Malayalam is the spoken language, it has a sizable population of Tamil speaking people. The weekly market on Thursdays attracts traders and shoppers from far and wide. Even elephants were traded at this market in the olden days.

This place was originally part of the Valluvanad Swaroopam dynasty.

Valluvanad was an erstwhile late medieval feudal state in present state of Kerala in South India extending from the Bharathapuzha River in the south to the Pandalur Mala in the north during their zenith in the early Middle Ages. On the west, it was bounded by the Arabian Sea at the port Ponnani and on the east by Attappadi Hills. According to local legends, the last Later Chera ruler gave a vast extension of land in South Malabar to one of their governors, Valluvakkonithiri and left for a hajj. The Valluvakkonithiri was also given last Later Chera ruler's shield (presumably to defend himself from the sword received by the Samoothiri (Zamorin) of Kozhikode, another governor, from the departing ruler). Not surprisingly, the Vellatiri rajas were hereditary enemies of the Samoothiri. Valluvanad is famous for the Mamankam festivals, held once in 12 years and the endless wars against the Samoothiri of Kozhikode. By the late 18th century, Vellatiri or Walluwanad proper was the sole remaining territory of the Walluvanad raja (Valluva Konatiri), who once exercised suzerain rights over a large portion of Southern Malabar. Although management of the country was restored to the Vellatiri raja in 1792, it soon became evident that he was powerless to repress the trouble that quickly broke out between Mapillas (favored by the Mysorean occupiers) and nayars (who sought to restore the ancien régime), and already in 1793 management of the district had to be resumed as the chief and his family fled to Travancore.

== Demographics ==
As of 2011 India census, Vaniyamkulam-II had a population of 16,085 with 7,750 males and 8,335 females. The sex ratio of Vaniyamkulam-II is 1075 females per 1000 males, which is lower than the Kerala state average of 1084. The literacy rate is 86.5%.

== Education ==
- P.K. Das Institute of Medical Sciences, a private medical college and super specialty hospital
- Nehru College of Nursing, Vaniyamkulam

== Transportation ==
This town connects to other parts of India through Palakkad city. National Highway 544 connects to Coimbatore and Kochi. Calicut International Airport, Cochin International Airport and Coimbatore Airports are the nearest airports. Shoranur Junction railway station and Ottapalam Railway Station are the nearest railway stations.
