= Maharashtra Forest Department =

Indian state department

- महाराष्ट्र वनविभाग

Agency overview
- Jurisdiction: Government of Maharashtra
- Headquarters: Nagpur, Maharashtra
- Minister responsible: Sri Ganesh Naik, Ministry of Environment, Forest Science and Technology
- Agency executive: Smt. Shoumita Biswas, IFS, Principal Chief Conservator of Forests (HoFF)
- Child agencies: FDCM; State Biodiversity Board
- Website: http://mahaforest.gov.in

The Maharashtra Forest Department (MFD) is a department of the Indian state of Maharashtra responsible for forestry and wildlife management. The headquarters of Maharashtra Forest Department is in Nagpur.

The office of the Principal Chief Conservator of Forests, Head of Forest Force (HoFF) is situated at Nagpur, which is considered as Headquarter of the forest Department in Maharashtra.

There are 11 territorial forest circles in

1. Amravati,
2. Aurangabad,
3. Chandrapur,
4. Dhule,
5. Gadchiroli,
6. Kolhapur,
7. Nagpur,
8. Nashik,
9. Pune,
10. Thane and
11. Yavatmal.

The three wildlife circles are

1. Wildlife-West (Borivali) ,
2. Wildlife-East (Nagpur) and
3. Wildlife (Nashik).

Rights of tribal people in the forest areas under Forest Rights Act are also governed by the Forest Department.

== Wildlife-Protected Areas ==
- Tiger Reserve

| Tiger Reserve | Year declared | Core Area (km^{2}) | Buffer Area (km^{2}) | Total Area (km^{2}) |
|---|---|---|---|---|
| Melghat Tiger Reserve | 1974 | 1,500 | 1,268 | 2,768 |
| Tadoba Andhari Tiger Reserve | 1993 | 626 | 1,102 | 1,728 |
| Pench Tiger Reserve | 1999 | 257.23 | 483.96 | 741.19 |
| Sahyadri Tiger Reserve | 2007 | 600 | 565 | 1,166 |
| Navegaon National Park | 2013 | 654 | 1241 | 1895 |
| Bor Wildlife Sanctuary | 2014 | 138 | 678 | 816 |
| Total | | 3775 | 5338 | 9113 |

- National Parks
1. Pench National Park
- Sanctuaries
1. Kanhargaon Wildlife Sanctuary
2. Pranhita Wildlife Sanctuary
3. Wan Wildlife Sanctuary
4. Dnyanganga Wildlife Sanctuary
- C.R.s

== 33 Crore Tree Plantation Drive ==
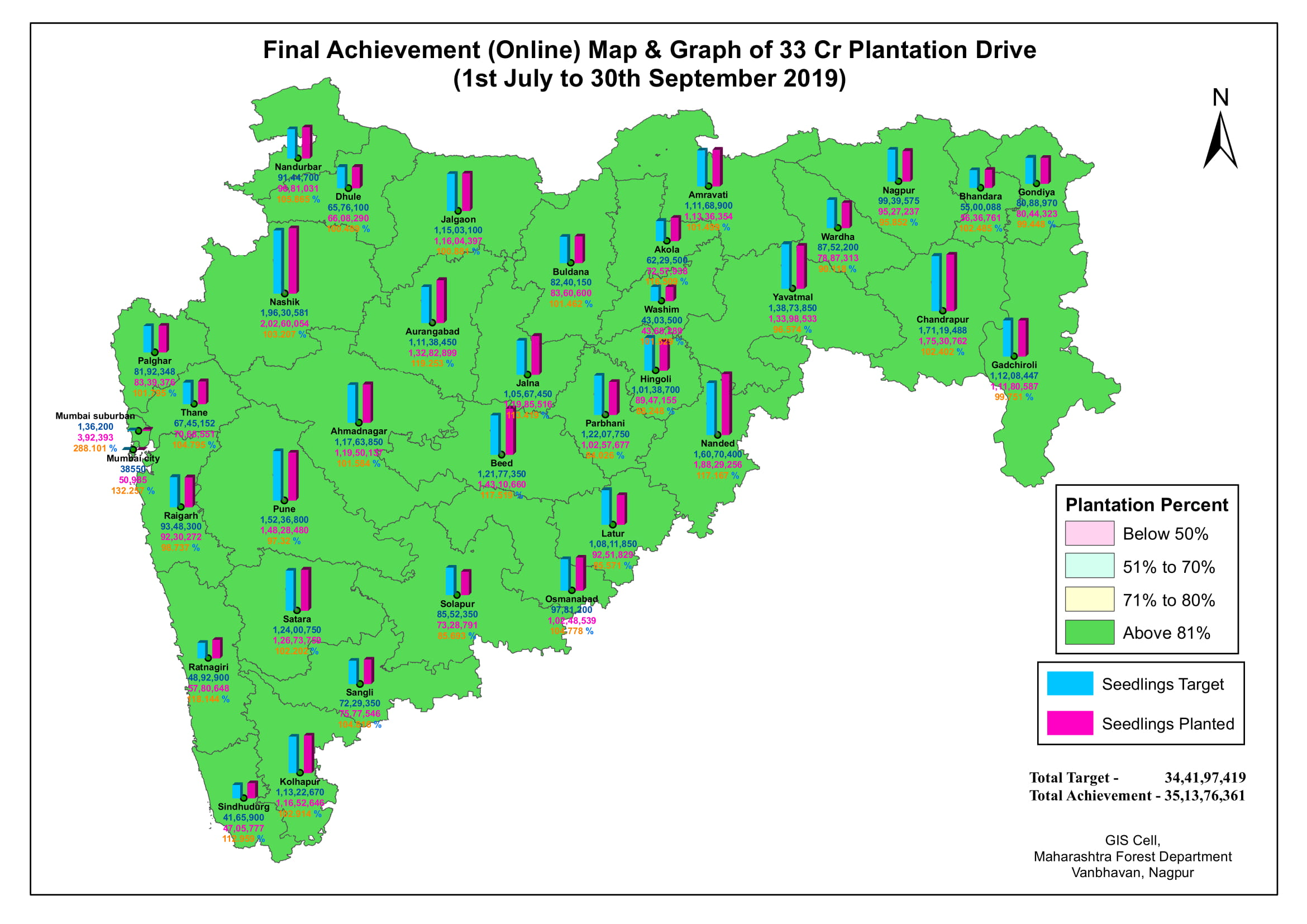
District wise contribution for 33 Crore Tree Plantation Drive from 1 July to 30 September 2019

To fight climate change and droughts in Maharashtra, the forest department planned 33 crore tree plantation drive. It was three-month long tree plantation drive across 36 districts from 1 July to 30 September in the State of Maharastra. The State over achieved the target by planting more than 33 Crore saplings. In total, Maharashtra Forest Department planted, 52 crore trees between 2017 and 2019 and the survival rate remains to be 81%.

== Departmental Hierarchy ==
- Principal Chief Conservator of Forests & Head of Forest Force (PCCF & HoFF)
- Principal Chief Conservator of Forests (PCCF)
- Additional Principal Chief Conservator of Forests (APCCF)
- Chief Conservator of Forests (CCF)
- Conservator of Forests (CF)
- Divisional Forest Officer (DFO) / Deputy Conservator of Forests (DCF)
- Assistant Conservator of Forests (ACF)
- Range Forest Officer (RFO)
- Dy. Ranger (DyRFO)/ Field Assistant
- Section Forest Officer (SFO)/Forester
- Beat Forest Officer/ Forest Guard(FG)

== See also ==
- List of Forests Departments in India
- Tamil Nadu Forest Uniformed Services Recruitment Committee
- Rajasthan forest department
- Department of Forest and Wildlife (Punjab)
