= All India Services =

Government services in India

- National Emblem of India

- Flag of India

The All India Services (AIS) are the three Civil Services of India common to the central and state governments, namely the Indian Administrative Service (IAS), the Indian Police Service (IPS), and the Indian Forest Service (IFS). Civil servants recruited through All India Services by the central government are assigned to different state government cadres. Some civil servants may, later in their career, also serve the centre on deputation. Officers of these three services comply to the All India Services Rules relating to pay, conduct, leave, various allowances, etc.

The central government is the Cadre Controlling Authority for all three All India Services. In terms of provisions for promotion regulations, the specific authorities are the Ministry of Personnel, Public Grievances and Pensions for IAS, while the Ministry of Home Affairs is the authority for IPS, and the Ministry of Environment, Forest and Climate Change is the authority for IFS. Recruitments are conducted by the Union Public Service Commission (UPSC) based on the annual Civil Services Examination for IAS and IPS, and the Indian Forest Service Examination for IFS. Since 2013, the preliminary test of the two examinations has been combined.

The All India Services Act, 1951, provides for the creation of two more All India Services, namely, the Indian Service of Engineers and the Indian Medical and Health Service.

== History ==
The history of All India Services dates back to the British era, when initially Civil Servants were appointed by the Court of Directors of the British East India Company. The service in those times was known as 'Covenanted Civil Service'. With time, they came to be known as Indian Civil Service (ICS).

In 1947, with India gaining independence, ICS was replaced by the Indian Administrative Service (IAS), and the Indian Police (IP) was replaced by Indian Police Service (IPS), and were recognised by the Indian Constitution as All-India Services. In 1963, the Indian Forest Service (IFS) was created, and it came into existence in 1966.

== Power, purpose, and responsibilities ==
The All India Services Act, 1951, empowers the government of India to make, after consultation with state governments, rules for the regulation of recruitment and conditions of service of the persons appointed to an All India Service. All India Service is governed by All India Service (Conduct) Rules, 1968, which specifies the code of conduct for Civil Servants in general. The All India Service (Conduct) Rules, 1968 were amended latest by Govt. of India by notification published in official Gazette of India on 10 April 2015.

=== Nature of work ===
Responsibilities vary with the seniority of the civil servant. Junior officers begin with probation and move up in the hierarchy. At the district level, the responsibilities are concerned with district matters as well as all developmental affairs, while at the divisional level, the responsibilities focus on law and order as well. Policy framing is carried on at the State and Central levels.

== Allocation, division, and cadres ==
=== Cadre allocation policy ===
The central government announced a new cadre allocation policy for the All India Services in August 2017, touting it as a policy to ensure national integration of the bureaucracy and to ensure an All India character of the services. The existing twenty-six cadres were to be divided into five zones by the Department of Personnel and Training. Under the new policy, a candidate first selects their zones of preference, in descending order, then indicates a cadre preference from each preferred zone. The candidate indicates their second cadre preference for every preferred zone subsequently. The preference for the zones and cadres remains in the same order, and no change is permitted.

Officers remain in their allocated cadre or are deputed to the Government of India.

Zones under the current cadre allocation policy
Zone	Cadres
Zone-I	AGMUT (Arunachal Pradesh-Goa-Mizoram and Union Territories), Jammu and Kashmir, Himachal Pradesh, Uttarakhand, Punjab, Rajasthan and Haryana
Zone-II	Uttar Pradesh, Bihar, Jharkhand and Odisha
Zone-III	Gujarat, Maharashtra, Madhya Pradesh and Chhattisgarh
Zone-IV	West Bengal, Sikkim, Assam-Meghalaya, Manipur, Tripura and Nagaland
Zone-V	Telangana, Andhra Pradesh, Karnataka, Tamil Nadu and Kerala

=== Indian Administrative Service ===
IAS Officers are trained to handle Government affairs. This being the main responsibility, every civil servant is assigned to a particular office that deals with policy matters pertaining to that area. The policy matters are framed, modified, and interpreted in this office under the direct supervision of the Administrative Officer in consultation with the Minister. The implementation of policies is also done on the advice of the Officer. The Cabinet Secretary stands at the top of the government machinery involved in policy making, followed by Secretary/Additional Secretary, Joint Secretary, Director, Under Secretary, and Junior Scale Officers in that order. These appointments are filled by civil servants according to seniority in the Civil Services. In the process of decision-making, several officers give their views to the Minister, who weighs the matter and makes a decision considering the issue involved.

The implementation process involves supervision and touring. The allocation of enormous funds to and by the field officers calls for supervision, and the officials concerned have to reply to queries made in the Parliament, for which they must remain well-informed. The Civil servant also has to represent the Government in another country or in international forums. At the level of Deputy Secretary, they are even authorized to sign agreements on behalf of the Government.

A civil servant begins their career in the state with two years in probation. This period is spent at training schools, Secretariat, field offices, or in a District Magistrate's office. They are given the position of Sub-Divisional Magistrate and have to look after the law, order, and general administration, including developmental work in the area under their charge. After the probation and 2 years of service as a junior scale officer, the officer is put in the senior scale. Then they may function as District Magistrate, Managing Director of a Public Enterprise, or Director of a department. Senior Scale comprises the Senior Time Scale (Joint Secretary), Junior Administrative Grade (Additional Secretary), and the Selection Grade (Special Secretary). Selection Grade is given on promotion after 13 years of regular service. The next promotion within the State is that of a commissioner-cum-secretary after 16 years. This promotion also entitles them to the Super Time Scale. Then, after 24 years of regular service, an IAS officer may be promoted to the Above super time scale, who is designated as Principal Secretaries/Financial Commissioners in some states.

Each State has many Secretaries/Principal Secretaries/Additional Chief Secretary and only one Chief Secretary. Some appointments of Secretaries are considered more prestigious than others, e.g., the Finance Secretary, Development Commissioners, and Home Secretary, and hence they enjoy the salary of a Principal Secretary. The Chief Secretary in the State is the top-ranking civil servant and may be assisted by Additional Chief Secretaries. In some cadres/States, e.g., New Delhi, Financial Commissioner, and other high-ranking secretaries such as Additional Chief Secretaries enjoy the pay of the Chief Secretary.

In the district, the administrative head is the Collector or Deputy Commissioner or District Magistrate. The DM/Collector/DC handles the affairs of the District, including development functions. They necessarily tour all rural sectors, inspecting specific projects, disputed sites, and look into the problems of people on the spot. At the divisional level, the Divisional Commissioner is in charge of their division. Their role is to oversee law and order and general administration, and developmental work. Appeals against the Divisional Commissioner are heard by the chairman of the Board of Revenue.

=== Indian Forest Service ===
India was one of the first countries in the world to introduce scientific forest management. In 1864, the British Raj established the Imperial Forest Department. In 1866, Dr. Dietrich Brandis, a German forest officer, was appointed Inspector General of Forests. The Imperial Forest Service (IFS) was organised in 1867.

IFS Officers appointed from 1867 to 1885 were trained in Germany and France, and from 1885 to 1905 at Cooper's Hill, London, which was a noted professional college of forestry. From 1905 to 1926, the University of Oxford, University of Cambridge, and University of Edinburgh undertook the task of training Imperial Forestry Service officers.

From 1927 to 1932, forest officers were trained at the Imperial Forest Research Institute (FRI) at Dehradun (established in 1906). Later, the Indian Forest College (IFC) was established in 1938 at Dehradun, and officers recruited to the Superior Forest Service by the states and provinces were trained there. Forestry, which was managed by the federal government until then, was transferred to the "provincial list" by the Government of India Act 1935, and recruitment to the Imperial Forestry Service was subsequently discontinued. The modern Indian Forest Service was established in 1966, after independence, under the All India Services Act 1951, for the protection, conservation, and regeneration of forest resources. India has an area of 635,400 km designated as forests, about 19.32 percent of the country. Forest is included in the Concurrent List.

Ranks of the Indian Forest Service are as follows: Assistant Conservator of Forests - Probationary Officer, Divisional Forest Officer (DFOs), Deputy Conservator of Forests, Conservator of Forests (CFs), Chief Conservator of Forests (CCFs), Additional Principal Chief Conservator of Forests (Addl. PCCFs), Principal Chief Conservator of Forests (PCCF) & Principal Chief Conservator of Forests (HoFF) - the highest post in a state, Director General of Forests (India) - the highest post at the centre, selected from amongst the senior-most PCCFs of states.

The training at Indira Gandhi National Forest Academy is designed so that theoretically a Forest Service officer, after completion of the probation, should be qualified enough to serve in the different terrains of India. Another remarkable feature of this service is that it requires keen technical knowledge along with excellent administrative capacity to deliver the duty. Government of India is also providing Hari Singh fellowships to Forest Service officers to get specialised in the field of Remote Sensing and Geographical Information System from the ISRO's Indian Institute of Remote Sensing, University of Twente/ITC Netherlands and in Wildlife Management from the Wildlife Institute of India. The Forest Service officers also work in various International and National organisations related to management of forests, wildlife and environment such as Food and Agricultural Organisation of the United Nations, International Centre for Integrated Mountain Development, SAARC Forestry Centre, Forest Survey of India, Wildlife Institute of India, Indian Council of Forestry Research and Education (ICFRE), Indira Gandhi National Forest Academy (IGNFA), Directorate of Forest Education, Wildlife Crime Control Bureau (WCCB), etc. besides getting entrusted with senior positions in the Central Secretariat, State Secretariats and various assignments under the Central Staffing Scheme.

=== Indian Police Service ===
The Indian Police Service (IPS) is responsible for internal security, public safety, and law and order. In 1948, a year after India gained independence from Britain, the Imperial Police (IP) was replaced by the Indian Police Service. The IPS is not a law enforcement agency in its own right; rather, it is the body to which all senior police officers belong, regardless of the agency for which they work. An IPS officer is subjected to and faces several life-threatening, crucial, complicated, and harsh conditions. They are entrusted with the overall internal security of the entire State as the Director General of Police and entire Districts as its Superintendent of Police, and in Metropolitan Cities as Deputy Commissioner or the entire City as the Commissioner of Police. As the Commissioner of Police, they enjoy magisterial powers.

The IPS officer takes charge as an Assistant Superintendent of Police of a sub-division/circle after probation of two years. The tenure of this post is normally three years. The next appointment is as Superintendent of Police or Deputy Commissioner of Police after four years, they get promoted to Junior Administrative Grade after nine years, then they serve as Senior Superintendent of Police and get pay of Selection Grade (Level 13) in 12–14 years, then as Deputy Inspector General of Police or Additional Commissioner of Police in 15 years, an Inspector General of Police in 18 years, Additional Director General of Police in 25 years and finally, the Director General of Police after 30 years in service.

IPS officers also work in national government agencies such as Intelligence Bureau, Research and Analysis Wing, Central Bureau of Investigation, etc. IPS officers also get highly placed in several PSUs such as GAIL, SAIL, Indian Oil Corporation Limited etc. at the State Secretariat the Central Secretariat under the Central Staffing Scheme and in CAPFs at leadership positions of National Security Guards, Border Security Force, the Indo-Tibetan Border Police, the Central Reserve Police Force and the Central Industrial Security Force, etc. An IPS officer has vast opportunities to work in several International Organisations such as Interpol, International Cricket Council, the United Nations, Consulates (Foreign Missions) and Embassies all over the World in various capacities such as First Secretary, Consul, Consul General, Deputy High Commissioner, Minister, High Commissioner and Ambassador. The Director General of Police and Commissioner of Police is the head of the entire police force of the State or Metropolitan City (e.g. Kolkata, Delhi, Mumbai, Chennai, etc.) and below him is the Additional DGP/Special Police Commissioner. The Inspector General or Joint Commissioner of Police is at the head of a certain specialised police force like Criminal Investigation Department, Special Branch, etc.

== Changes and reforms ==
In January 2012, the government amended All India Services Rule 16 (3) which permits the central government in consultation with the state government to retire in the public interest, incompetent and non-performing officers after a review on their completion of 15 years or 25 years of qualifying service or attaining the age of 50.

On recommendation by Ministry of Personnel, Public Grievances and Pensions, from the year 2014, state civil servants are required to clear a 1000-mark four-stage process, including a written exam and interview conducted by Union Public Service Commission, to get promoted to the three all-India services, which was previously based solely on seniority and annual confidential reports.

=== Expected reforms ===
Creating the remaining two All India Services, as provided by the All India Services Act, 1951:

==== Indian Service of Engineers ====
This service is yet to be constituted.

==== Indian Medical and Health Service (IMHS) ====
The States Reorganization Commission had recommended the constitution of more All-India Services for promoting national integration. This was considered at the conference of chief ministers of all the states and the central ministers in August 1961. Following this, in December 1961 the Rajya Sabha passed the requisite resolution under Article 312(1) of the Constitution and the All India Services act was amended in 1963 with provisions for creation of 3 new All India Services namely:

- The Indian Service of Engineers (Irrigation, Power, Buildings, and Roads)
- The Indian Forest Service (constituted with effect from 1 July 1966)
- The Indian Medical and Health Service

The Government of India, in consultation with the Union Public Service Commission, had promulgated the following three rules and regulations for the constitution of the Indian Medical and Public Health Service with effect from 1 February 1969.

- The Indian Medical and Health Service (Recruitment) Rules, 1969
- The Indian Medical and Health Service (Initial Recruitment) Regulations, 1969
- The Indian Medical and Health Service (Cadre) Rules, 1969

As per these rules, the officers holding Class I posts of the Central Health Service (CHS) would be allotted state cadres after the constitution of IMHS, they would be considered as on central deputation, and after a tenure, would revert to their state cadres. The states of Tamil Nadu and Mysore did not agree to participate in the scheme of the service. The constitution of these services were delayed further. Another attempt was made to constitute IMHS with effect from 26 January 1977, but these notifications were cancelled later.

== See also ==
- Gazetted officer
- Order of precedence in India
- Central Civil Services
- Civil Services of India
- Civil Services Examination
- Indian Railway Management Service
- Combined Defence Services Examination
- Engineering Services Examination
- Combined Medical Services Examination
- Union Public Service Commission
- Staff Selection Commission
- Public service commissions in India
- Indian Institute of Public Administration
- Appointments Committee of the Cabinet
- Ministry of Personnel, Public Grievances and Pensions
