= Pathamkulam =

- village
- Location in Kerala, India Pathamkulam (India)
- Coordinates: 10°48′0″N 76°20′0″E
- Country: India
- State: Kerala
- District: Palakkad

Languages
  - Official: Malayalam, English
- Time zone: UTC+5:30 (IST)
- PIN: 679522
- Vehicle registration: KL-51
- Nearest city: ottapalam
- Lok Sabha constituency: Palakkad
- Climate: moderate (Köppen)

Pathamkulam is a village and ward in Palakkad district, Kerala, India, about 3 kilometers from Vaniamkulam. Pathamkulam translates to "land of 10 ponds". It is located in an agricultural area, where the main crop is rice. There is an office of the Kerala Agriculture Department, which is a source of employment. One of the major attractions is a temple of the goddess Durga, where the temple festival ("Pooram" in Malayalam) is held each year in February. Apart from all these pathamkulam is very famous for the culture and heritage. Pathamkulam is a typical example of Palakkad village.

== Notable residents ==
- Prof. Kayarat Saikrishnan: Recipient of The Shanti Swarup Bhatnagar Prize for Science and Technology (one of the highest science awards in India), 2019.
