= Indian Forest Service =

One of three All India Services

- Service Overview
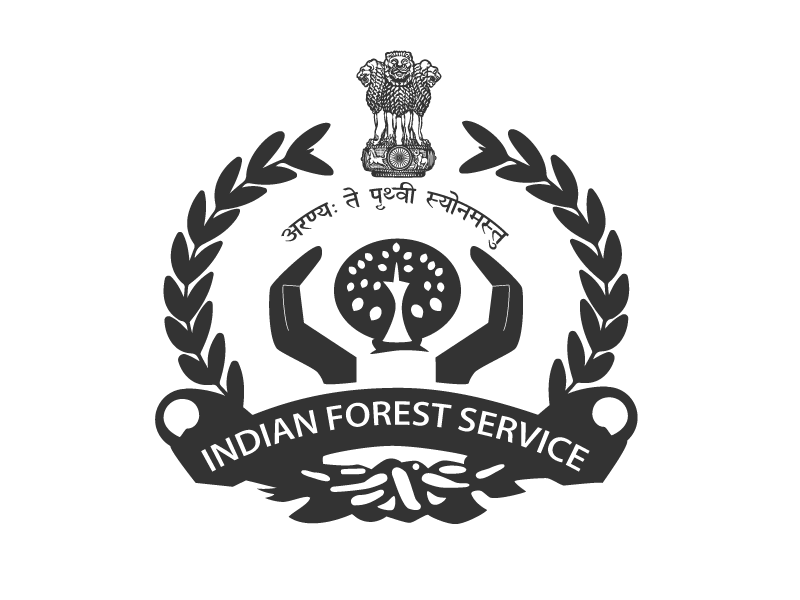
- Motto: अरण्यः ते पृथ्वी स्योनमस्तु (Sanskrit) "The Forest is Earth's Delight"
- Abbreviation: IFS
- Date of establishment: 1 July 1966; 59 years ago
- Country: India
- Staff college: Indira Gandhi National Forest Academy, Dehradun, Uttarakhand
- Cadre controlling authority: Ministry of Environment, Forest and Climate Change
- Minister responsible: Bhupender Yadav, Minister of Environment, Forest and Climate Change
- General nature: Governmental, Natural resources
- Cadre strength: 3131 (2182 Direct Recruits and 949 Promotion Posts)
- Website: ifs.nic.in

Service Chief
- Director General of Forests: Sushil Kumar Awasthi, IFS

Head of the All India Services
- Cabinet Secretary: T. V. Somanathan

The Indian Forest Service (IFS) is the premier forest service of India. The IFS is one of the three All India Services along with the Indian Administrative Service (IAS) & the Indian Police Service (IPS). It was constituted in the year 1966 under the All India Services Act, 1951.

The service implements the National Forest Policy in order to ensure the ecological stability of the country through the protection and participatory sustainable management of natural resources. The members of the service also manage the National Parks, Tiger Reserve, Wildlife Sanctuaries and other Protected Areas of the country. A Forest Service officer is wholly independent of the district administration and exercises administrative, judicial and financial powers in their own domain. Positions in state forest department, such as

- District/Divisional Forest Officer (DFO),
- Conservator of Forests,
- Chief Conservator of Forests and
- Principal Chief Conservator of Forests etc.,

are held, at times, by Indian Forest Service officers.

- The highest-ranking Forest Service official in each state is the Head of Forest Forces.

A forest service officer also hold positions of Chairman and Member Secretary in the State Pollution Control Boards.

Earlier, the British Government in India had constituted the Imperial Forest Service in 1867 which functioned under the Federal Government until the Government of India Act 1935 was passed and responsibility was transferred to the provinces.

Administration of the Service is the responsibility of the Ministry of Environment, Forest and Climate Change.

== History ==
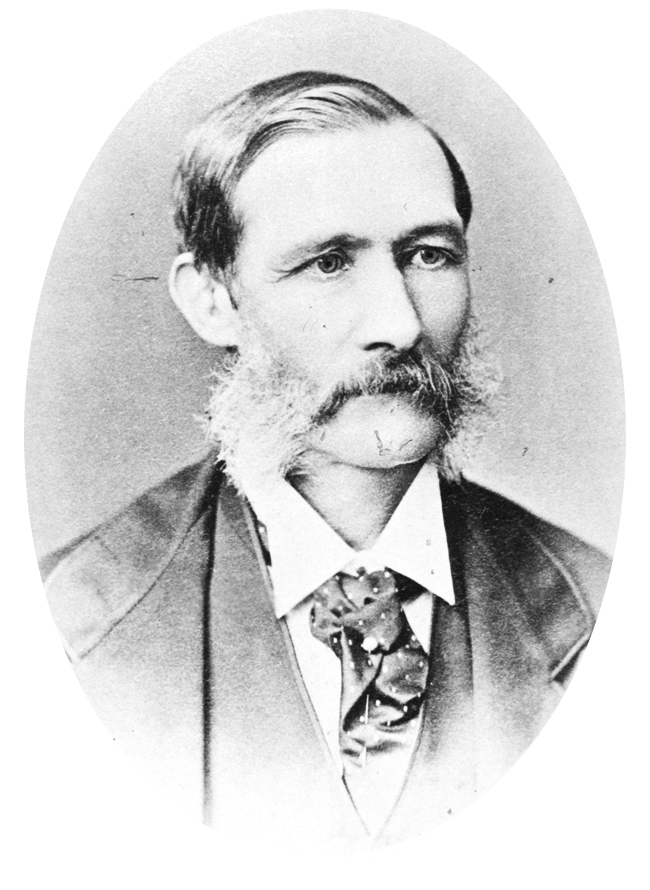
Dietrich Brandis is widely considered as the father of the Service

In 1864, the British Raj established the Imperial Forest Department; Dietrich Brandis, a German forest officer, was appointed Inspector General of Forests. The Imperial Forestry Service was organized subordinate to the Imperial Forest Department in 1867.

Officers from 1867 to 1885 were trained in Germany and France, and from 1885 to 1905 at Cooper's Hill, London, also known as Royal Indian Engineering College. From 1905 to 1926, the University of Oxford (Sir William Schlich), University of Cambridge, and University of Edinburgh trained Imperial Forestry Service officers.

=== Modern agency ===
The modern Indian Forest Service was established in 1966, after independence, under the All India Services Act 1951. The first Inspector General of Forests, Hari Singh, was instrumental in the development of the Forest Service.

India has an area of 635,400 km^{2} designated as forests, about 19.32% of the country. India's forest policy was created in 1894 and was subsequently revised in the years 1952 and 1988.

== Recruitment ==
Officers are recruited through an open competitive examination conducted by the UPSC and then trained for about two years by the Central Government at Indira Gandhi National Forest Academy. Their services are placed under various State cadres and joint cadres, being an All India Service they have the mandate to serve both under the State and Central Governments.

They are eligible for State and Central deputations as their counterpart IAS and IPS officers. Deputation of Forest Service officers to the Central Government includes appointments in Central Ministries at the position of Deputy Secretary, Director, Joint Secretary and Additional Secretary etc.; appointments in various Public Sector Units, Institutes and Academies at the position of Chief Vigilance Officer, Regional passport officers, Managing Directors, Inspector General, Director General etc.

=== Training ===
On acceptance to the Forest Service, new entrants undergo a probationary period (and are referred to as Officer Trainees). Training begins at the Lal Bahadur Shastri National Academy of Administration in Mussoorie, where members of many civil services are trained for the period of 15 weeks.

On completion of which they go to the Indira Gandhi National Forest Academy at Dehradun, for a more intensive training in a host of subjects important to Forestry, Wildlife Management, Biodiversity, Environment Protection, Climate Change, Forest Policies and Laws, Remote Sensing and GIS, Forest Dwellers and Scheduled Tribes. After completion of their training, the officers are awarded a master's degree in Science (Forestry) of Forest Research Institute. The officers are taught more than 56 subjects of life sciences. The officers undergo 13 months of Phase 1 training, then after 4 months of on job training in their respective cadres and finally complete 3 months of Phase 2 training in the academy

They are also taught weapon handling, horse riding, motor vehicle training, swimming, forest and wildlife crime detections. They also go on attachments with different government bodies and institutes such as Indian Military Academy, Sardar Vallabhbhai Patel National Police Academy, Wildlife Institute of India, Bombay Natural History Society etc. They also undertake extensive tours both in India and a short tour abroad.

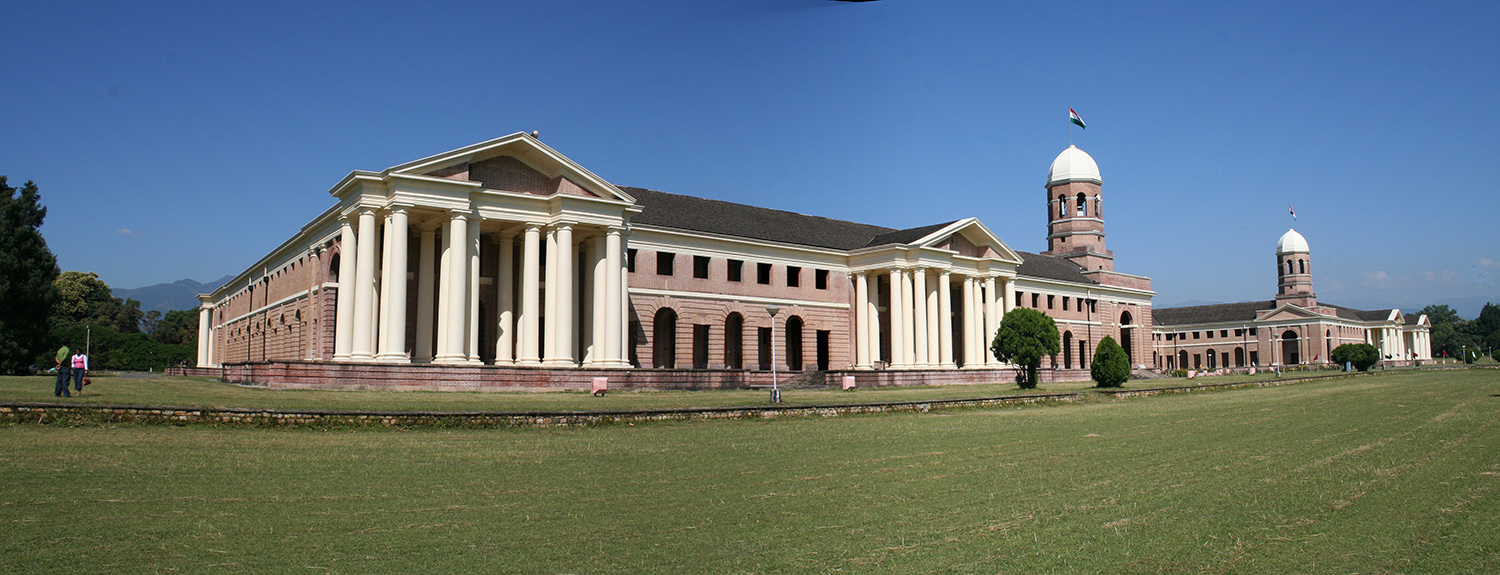
Forest Research Institute in Dehradun

After completing training at the academy, candidates go through a year of on-the-job field training in the state to which he or she is assigned, during which they are posted as Assistant Conservators of Forests/ Assistant Deputy Conservators of Forest or Deputy Conservator of Forests.

=== State Cadres ===
==== Cadre Allocation Policy ====
The Union Government announced a new cadre allocation policy for the All India Services in August 2017.

Under the new policy, a candidate has to rank the five zones in order of preference. Subsequently, the candidate has to indicate one preference of cadre from each preferred zone. The candidate indicates their second cadre preference for every preferred zone subsequently. The process continues till a preference for all the cadres is indicated by the candidate.

Officers continue to work in the cadre they are allotted or are deputed to the Government of India.

Zones under the new Cadre Allocation Policy
Zone	States
Zone-I	AGMUT (Arunachal Pradesh-Goa-Mizoram and Union Territories including erstwhile state of Jammu and Kashmir), Himachal Pradesh, Uttarakhand, Punjab, Rajasthan and Haryana.
Zone-II	Uttar Pradesh, Bihar, Jharkhand and Odisha.
Zone-III	Gujarat, Maharashtra, Madhya Pradesh and Chhattisgarh.
Zone-IV	West Bengal, Sikkim, Assam-Meghalaya, Manipur, Tripura and Nagaland.
Zone-V	Telangana, Andhra Pradesh, Karnataka, Tamil Nadu and Kerala.

==== Old Cadre Allocation Policies ====
Till 2008 there was no system of preference of state cadre by the candidates; the candidates, if not placed in the insider vacancy of their home states, were allotted to different states in alphabetic order of the roster, beginning with the letters A, H, M, T for that particular year. For example, if in a particular year, the roster begins from 'A', which means the first candidate on the roster will go to the Andhra Pradesh state cadre of the Forest Service, the next one to Bihar, and subsequently to Chhattisgarh, Gujarat, and so on in alphabetical order. The next year the roster starts from 'H', for either Haryana or Himachal Pradesh (if it had started from Haryana on the previous occasion when it all started from 'H', then this time it would start from Himachal Pradesh). This highly intricate system, in vogue since the mid-1980s, had ensured that officers from different states were placed all over India.

The system of permanent State cadres has also resulted in wide disparities in the kind of professional exposure for officers when we compare officers in small and big and developed and backward states. Changes of state cadre were permitted on the grounds of marriage to an All India Service officer of another state cadre or under other exceptional circumstances. The officer may go to their home state cadre on deputation for a limited period, after which one has to invariably return to the cadre allotted to him or her.

From 2002 to 2008 Forest Service officers were allotted to State cadres at the beginning of their service. There was one cadre for each Indian state, except for two joint cadres: Assam–Meghalaya and Arunachal Pradesh–Goa–Mizoram–Union Territories (AGMUT). The "insider-outsider ratio" (ratio of officers who were posted in their home states) is maintained as 1:2, with one-third of the direct recruits as 'insiders' from the same state. The rest were posted as outsiders according to the 'roster' in states other than their home states, as per their preference.

== Career Progression ==
Pay structure of Indian Forest Service

Ranks, designations, and positions held by Indian Forest Service (IFS) officers in their career
Grade/Scale (Level on Pay Matrix)	Posting in State Government	Posting in Government of India (GoI)	Position on order of precedence in India	Pay Scale (Basic Pay)
Administrative Head (Pay Level 17)	—	Director General of Forests (Ministry of Environment, Forest and Climate Change)	23 (Note: Director General of Forests is the senior-most IFS and the administrative head of the Ministry of Environment, Forest and Climate Change, and is equivalent to Secretary to the Government of India.)	₹225,000 (US$2,300)
Apex Scale (Pay Level 17)	Principal Chief Conservator of Forests (Head of Forest Force)	Secretary	23	₹225,000 (US$2,300)
Higher Administrative Grade+ (Pay Level 16)	Principal Chief Conservator of Forests (Head of Forest Force)	Additional Director General of Forests	25	₹205,400 – ₹224,400
Higher Administrative Grade (Pay Level 15)	Additional Principal Chief Conservator of Forests (APCCF)	Additional Secretary	25	₹182,200 (US$1,900)—₹224,100 (US$2,300)
Senior Administrative Grade (Pay Level 14)	Chief Conservator of Forests (CCF)	Inspector General of Forests Joint Secretary	26	₹144,200 (US$1,500)—₹218,200 (US$2,300)
Super Time Scale (Pay Level 13A)	Conservator of Forests (CF)	Deputy Inspector General of Forests Director to Government of India	—	₹131,100 (US$1,400)—₹216,000 (US$2,300)
Selection Grade (Pay Level 13)	Conservator of Forests (CF)	Deputy Inspector General of Forests Deputy Secretary to Government of India	—	₹118,500 (US$1,200)—₹214,000 (US$2,200)
Junior Administrative Grade (Pay Level 12)	Deputy Conservator of Forests (DCF) Divisional Forest Officer (DFO)	Assistant Inspector General of Forests Deputy Secretary to Government of India	—	₹78,800 (US$820)—₹209,200 (US$2,200)
Senior Time Scale (Pay Level 11)	Deputy Conservator of Forests (DCF) Divisional Forest Officer (DFO)	Assistant Inspector General of Forests Under Secretary to Government of India	—	₹67,700 (US$710)—₹208,700 (US$2,200)
Junior Time Scale (Pay Level 10)	Assistant Conservator of Forests (ACF) Assistant Deputy Conservator of Forests (ADCF)	Assistant Inspector General of Forests Assistant Secretary to Government of India	—	₹56,100 (US$590)—₹177,500 (US$1,900)

== Principal Chief Conservator of Forests ==
The Principal Chief Conservator of Forests (Hindi: प्रधान मुख्य वन संरक्षक) is the highest-ranking officer belonging to the Indian Forest Service who is responsible for managing the Forests, Environment and Wild-Life related issues of a state of India. It is the highest rank of an officer of the Indian Forest Service in a State.

At times the states may have more than one post of PCCF and in that case, one of them is designated as the Head of Forest Forces (HoFF).

- HoFF/PCCF is supported by APCCFs, Chief Conservator of Forests, Conservator of Forests, DFOs and field level functionaries such as ACF and Range Forest officers, Beat Forest Officers in their work.

== List of Forests Departments in India ==
Forest Departments in India
Sl. No.	Department	Logo	Headquarters
1	Andhra Pradesh Forest Department	—	Mangalagiri, Andhra Pradesh
2	Gujarat Forest Department	—	Gandhinagar, Gujarat
3	Tamil Nadu Forest Department	—	Guindy, Chennai, Tamil Nadu
4	Maharashtra Forest Department		Nagpur, Maharashtra
5	Kerala Forest & Wildlife Department	—	Thiruvananthapuram, Kerala
6	Department of Forest and Wildlife (Punjab)	—	Mohali, Punjab
7	Haryana Forest Department	—	Panchkula, Haryana
8	Department of Environment and Forests, Assam	—	Guwahati, Assam
9	West Bengal Forest Department	—	Kolkata, West Bengal
10	Karnataka Forest Department	—	Bengaluru, Karnataka

== Controversies ==
=== Corruption ===
As per media reports, some Forest Service officers have been found corrupt and have been arrested by Central Bureau of Investigation for bribing and corruption.

=== Dubious PhD degrees ===
In 2015, Tehelka reported that more than 30 names of Forest Service officers who might have been awarded dubious or suspect Ph.D. degrees.

=== Changing Name ===
The National Commission for Scheduled Tribes has proposed the idea of renaming the Indian Forest Service as the ‘Indian Forest and Tribal Service’.

== Notable officers ==
=== Imperial Forest Service (1864–1935) ===
- Cyril Beeson – Forest entomologist and author of texts on forest insects in India.
- Dietrich Brandis – First Inspector General of Forests in India.
- Frederick Walter Champion – Wildlife photographer and early advocate for wildlife conservation in the subcontinent.
- Hugh Cleghorn – Botanist, instrumental in establishing the early forest departments.
- Peter Clutterbuck – Inspector General of Forests.
- James Sykes Gamble – Botanist and compiler of the Flora of the Presidency of Madras.
- Edgar Peacock – Forest officer and wildlife expert in Burma.
- Wilhelm Philipp Daniel Schlich – Inspector General of Forests and founder of the forestry program at Oxford University.
- Bertram Smythies – Forester, ornithologist, and author of The Birds of Burma.
- E. A. Smythies – Silviculturist and conservationist in the United Provinces.
- Robert Scott Troup – Silviculturist and author of The Silviculture of Indian Trees.
- Framjee Rustomjee Desai - First ever Indian IFS officer

=== Indian Forest Service (1966–present) ===
- Hari Singh – First Inspector General of the modern IFS, instrumental in drafting post-independence forestry legislation
- Kailash Sankhala – First Director of Project Tiger, called the 'Tiger Man of India'
- Hemendra Singh Panwar – Founding Director of the Wildlife Institute of India, authored foundational conservation guidelines
- Fateh Singh Rathore – WWF lifetime achievement award recipient for transforming the Ranthambore National Park
- Sanjiv Chaturvedi – Ramon Magsaysay Award recipient.

==== Died in the line of duty ====
- P. Srinivas (1991) – Posthumously awarded the Kirti Chakra after being killed by Veerappan.
- Sanjay Kumar Singh (2002) – Killed by the illegal mining mafia after initiating crackdowns on illicit stone quarrying.
- S. Manikandan (2018) – Conservator of Forests fatally attacked by a wild elephant in Nagarhole National Park.

== See also ==
- Indian Council of Forestry Research and Education
- Andhra Pradesh Forest Department
- Maharashtra Forest Department
- Kerala Forest and Wildlife Department
- Van Vigyan Kendra (Forest Science Centres)
