= Director General of Forests =

Forest administration in India

Director General of Forests is a term used in various countries for high officials in forest management and forestry.

== Germany ==
The Generalforstmeister (Director General of Forests) was the second highest forestry official in the Prussian civil service and in the German Reich. He was subordinate to the Reichsforstmeister, the head of the Reich Forestry, and was his deputy. The title of Generalforstmeister corresponded to the former Oberlandforstmeister.

== India ==
The Director General of Forests of India is the highest-ranking officer of the Indian Forest Service. The director is posted in the Union Government of India and generally selected from the senior-most PCCFs of the states of India. The Indian Government has only one post for the Director General of Forests. The person holding this rank is also the ex-officio Special Secretary in the Ministry of Environment, Forest and Climate Change. An officer posted at this level has generally completed about 35 years of service.

At present (2025) Sushil Kumar Awasthi is currently working as the Director General of Forests and Special Secretary to Government of India, Ministry of Environment, Forest and Climate Change.

== See also ==
- Indian Council of Forestry Research and Education
- Van Vigyan Kendra Forest Science Centres
