= Head of Forest Forces =

Highest ranking officer of the Indian Forest Service

In India, the Head of Forest Force (HoFF) is the highest ranking officer of the Indian Forest Service (IFS), one of the three All India Services with the other two being IAS and IPS, in the Indian States and Union Territories. Each Head of Forest Forces is an IFS officer, and has the rank of Principal Chief Conservator of Forests (PCCF).

- The HoFF is the head of the forest department in Indian states and is selected by the Governor, based on the recommendation of the council of ministers led by the Chief Minister, from among the senior most (PCCF) Principal Chief Conservators of Forests in the state.
- The HoFF is equivalent to the State Police Chief/Head of Police Force (DGP), Chief Secretary and Lieutenant General of army in rank and influence.

== List of current HoFF in India ==
Heads of Forest Forces of States
S. No.	State	Headquarters	Name of HoFF	Batch
1	Andhra Pradesh	Mangalagiri	Chiranjiv Choudhary, IFS	1989
2	Arunachal Pradesh	Itanagar	Omkar Singh, IFS	1982
3	Assam	Guwahati	Darash Mathur, IFS	1980
4	Bihar	Patna	A. K. Pandey, IFS	1986
5	Chhattisgarh	Raipur	Arvind Anil Boaz, IFS	1979
6	Goa	Panaji	Santosh Kumar, IFS	
7	Gujarat	Gandhinagar	Dr. Jaipal Singh, IFS	1985
8	Haryana	Panchkula	Amrinder Kaur, IFS	1983
9	Himachal Pradesh	Shimla	Sanjay Sood, IFS	1993
10	Jharkhand	Ranchi	Ashok Kumar, IFS	1991
11	Karnataka	Bengaluru	Brijesh Kumar Dikshit, IFS	1979
12	Kerala	Thiruvananthapuram	Ganga Singh, IFS	1980
13	Madhya Pradesh	Bhopal	Manoj Kumar Sapra, IFS	1981
14	Maharashtra	Nagpur	Mrs. Shoumita Biswas, IFS	1979
15	Manipur	Imphal	Bala Prasad, IFS	1983
16	Meghalaya	Shillong	Sunil Kumar, IFS	1979
17	Mizoram	Aizawl	J. L. Singh, IFS	1979
18	Nagaland	Kohima	M. Lokeshwara Rao, IFS	1983
19	Odisha	Bhubaneswar	S. S. Srivastava, IFS	1980
20	Punjab	Mohali	Kuldip Kumar, IFS	1984
21	Rajasthan	Jaipur	Anil Kumar Goel, IFS	1983
22	Sikkim	Gangtok	Thomas Chandy, IFS	1985
23	Tamil Nadu	Chennai	Vinod Kumar, IFS	1980
24	Telangana	Hyderabad	R. Sobha, IFS	1986
25	Tripura	Agartala	S. Talukdar, IFS	1981
26	Uttar Pradesh	Lucknow	Pawan Kumar, IFS	1983
27	Uttarakhand	Dehradun	Dr. Samir Sinha, IFS	1990
28	West Bengal	Kolkata	Niraj Singhal, IFS	1990

Heads of Forest Forces/ Forest Department Heads of Union Territories
S. No.	Union Territory	Headquarters	Name of the HoFF/Forest Department Head	Batch
1	Andaman and Nicobar Islands	Port Blair	Tarun Coomar, IFS	1985
2	Chandigarh	Chandigarh	Santosh Kumar, IFS	1993
3	Dadra and Nagar Haveli and Daman and Diu	Daman	Debendra Dalai, IFS	1999
4	Delhi	New Delhi	Tarun Coomar, IFS	1985
5	Jammu and Kashmir	Srinagar (May–Oct) and Jammu (Nov–Apr)	Mohit Gera, IFS	1987
6	Ladakh	Leh	TBD	
7	Lakshadweep	Kavaratti	K. Kar, IFS	1999
8	Puducherry	Pondicherry	G. Kumar, IFS	1986

== See also ==
- Indian Forest Service
- Indian Council of Forestry Research and Education
- Ministry of Environment and Forests
- Indian Administrative Service (IAS)
- All India Services
- Van Vigyan Kendra (Forest Science Centres)
- Indira Gandhi National Forest Academy
- Chief Secretary
- Director General of Police
- Advocate General
