= Vaniyamkulam-II =

- village
- Interactive map of Vaniyamkulam-II
- Country: India
- State: Kerala
- District: Palakkad

Population (2011)
  - Total: 16,085

Languages
  - Official: Malayalam, English
- Time zone: UTC+5:30 (IST)
- PIN: 6XXXXX
- Vehicle registration: KL-

Vaniyamkulam-II is a village in the Palakkad district, state of Kerala, India. Together with Vaniyamkulam-I, it forms a part of the Vaniamkulam gram panchayat.

== Demographics ==
As of 2011 India census, Vaniyamkulam-II had a population of 16,085 with 7,750 males and 8,335 females.
