= Ranks and insignia of the German Forest Service (Nazi Germany) =

German forest service ranks

The ranks and insignia of the German Forest Service were the paramilitary rank system used by the forest services in Nazi Germany. The collar tabs and shoulder boards underlay identified the service. Green for State Forest Service, gray for Municipal Forest Service, black for Luftwaffe and Heer Forest Service and brown for Private Forest Service.

== Rank Insignia ==
=== Ranks (1934–1938) ===
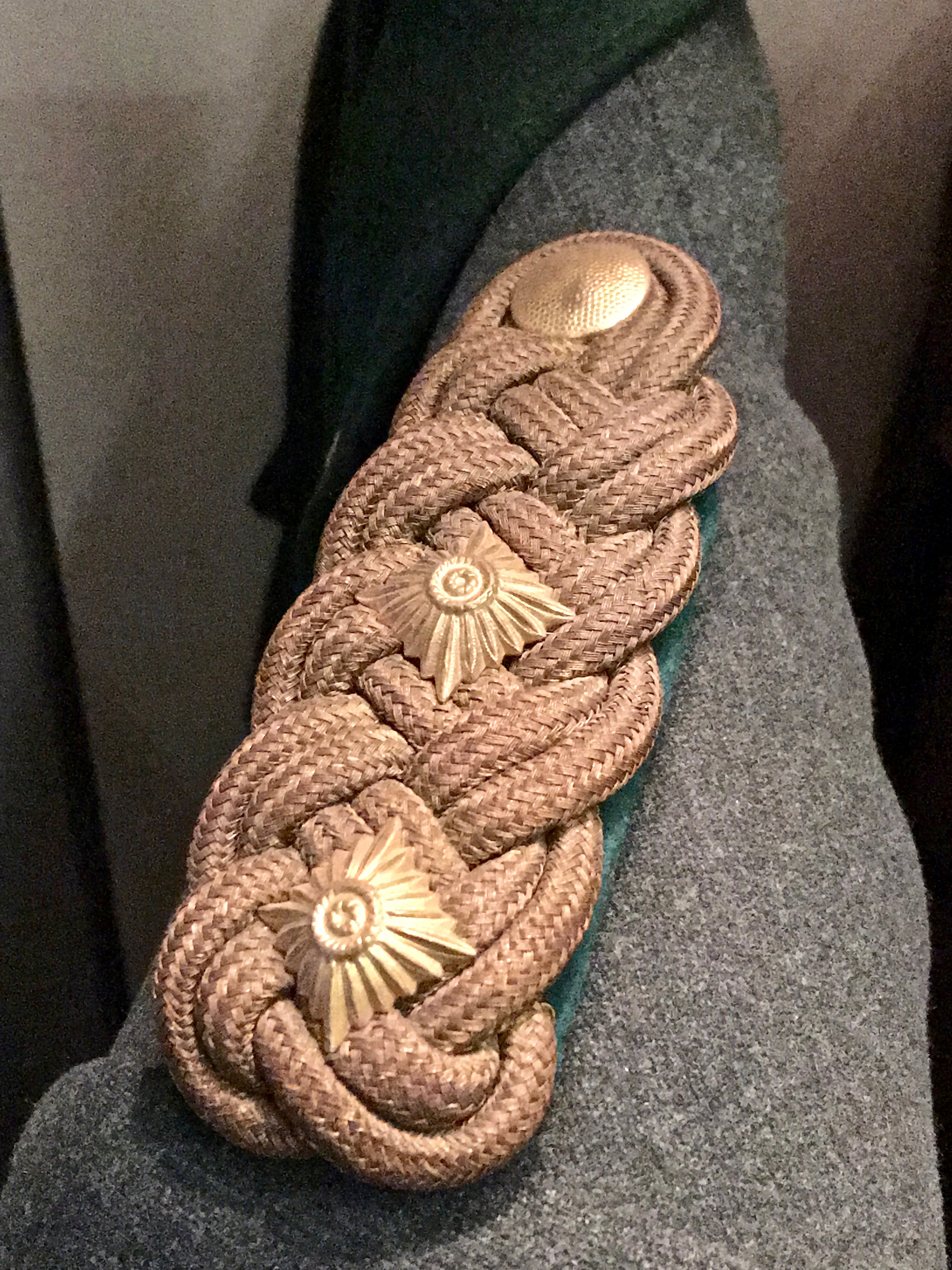
Military style shoulderboard on a uniform tunic for a forest director of the German State Forest Service 1936 – 1937 (Dienstrock eines Forstdirektors des Deutschen Staatsforstdienstes). Photo from the exhibitions in Deutsches Historisches Museum, Berlin

| Shoulder insignia | Name | Translation |
|---|---|---|
| | Generalforstmeister | General Forest Master |
| | Oberlandforstmeister | Senior country forest master |
| | Landforstmeister | Country forest master |
| | Oberforstmeister | Senior forest master |
| | Forstmeister | Forest master |
| | Forstassessor | Forest Assessor |
| | Forstreferendar | District forester |
| | Forstamtmann | Forestry Office man |
| | Oberförster | Senior Ranger |
| | Revierförster | Area Ranger |
| | Förster | Ranger |
| | Hilfsförster | Auxiliary Ranger |
| | Unterförster | Under Ranger |
| | Forstaufseher | Forester |
| No insignia | Forstanwärter | Forester Candidate |

=== Ranks (1938–1942) ===
| Collar insignia | Shoulder insignia | Name | Translation |
|---|---|---|---|
| | | Reichsforstmeister | Reichs Forest Master |
| | | Generalforstmeister | General Forest Master |
| | | Ministerialdirigent | Secretary |
| | | Oberlandforstmeister | Senior Country Forest Master |
| | | Landforstmeister | Country Forest Master |
| | | Oberforstmeister | Senior Forest Master |
| | | Forstmeister | Forest Master |
| | | Forstamtmann | Forestry Office man |
| | | Oberförster | Senior Ranger |
| | | Revierförster | Area Ranger |
| | | Förster | Ranger |
| | | Unterförster | Under Ranger |
| | | Hilfsförster | Auxiliary Ranger |
| | | Forstaufseher | Forester |
| | | Forstanwärter | Forester Candidate |

=== Ranks (1942–1945) ===
| Collar insignia | Shoulder insignia | Name | Translation |
|---|---|---|---|
| | | Reichsforstmeister | Reichs Forest Master |
| | | Generalforstmeister | General Forest Master |
| | | Ministerialdirektor | Director of the Ministry |
| | | Ministerialdirigent | Secretary |
| | | Oberlandforstmeister | Senior country forest master |
| | | Landforstmeister | Country forest master |
| | | Oberforstmeister | Senior forest master |
| | | Forstmeister | Forest master |
| | | Forstassessor | Forest Assessor |
| | | Forstreferendar | District forester |
| | No insignia | Anwärter für den höheren Forstdienst | Candidate for the higher forestry service |
| | | Forstamtmann | Forestry Office man |
| | | Oberförster | Senior Ranger |
| | | Revierförster | Area Ranger |
| | | Außerplanmäßiger Revierförster | Supernumerary Area Ranger |
| | | Revierförsteranwärter | Area Ranger Candidate |
| | No insignia | Forstlehrling | Forestry apprentice |
| | | Oberforstwart | Senior Forester Ranger |
| | | Forstwart | Forest Ranger |
| | | Außerplanmäßiger Forstwart | Supernumerary Forest Ranger |
| | | Forstwartanwärter | Forest Ranger Candidate |
| | | Forstaufseher | Forester |
