= Vaniyamkulam-I =

- Town
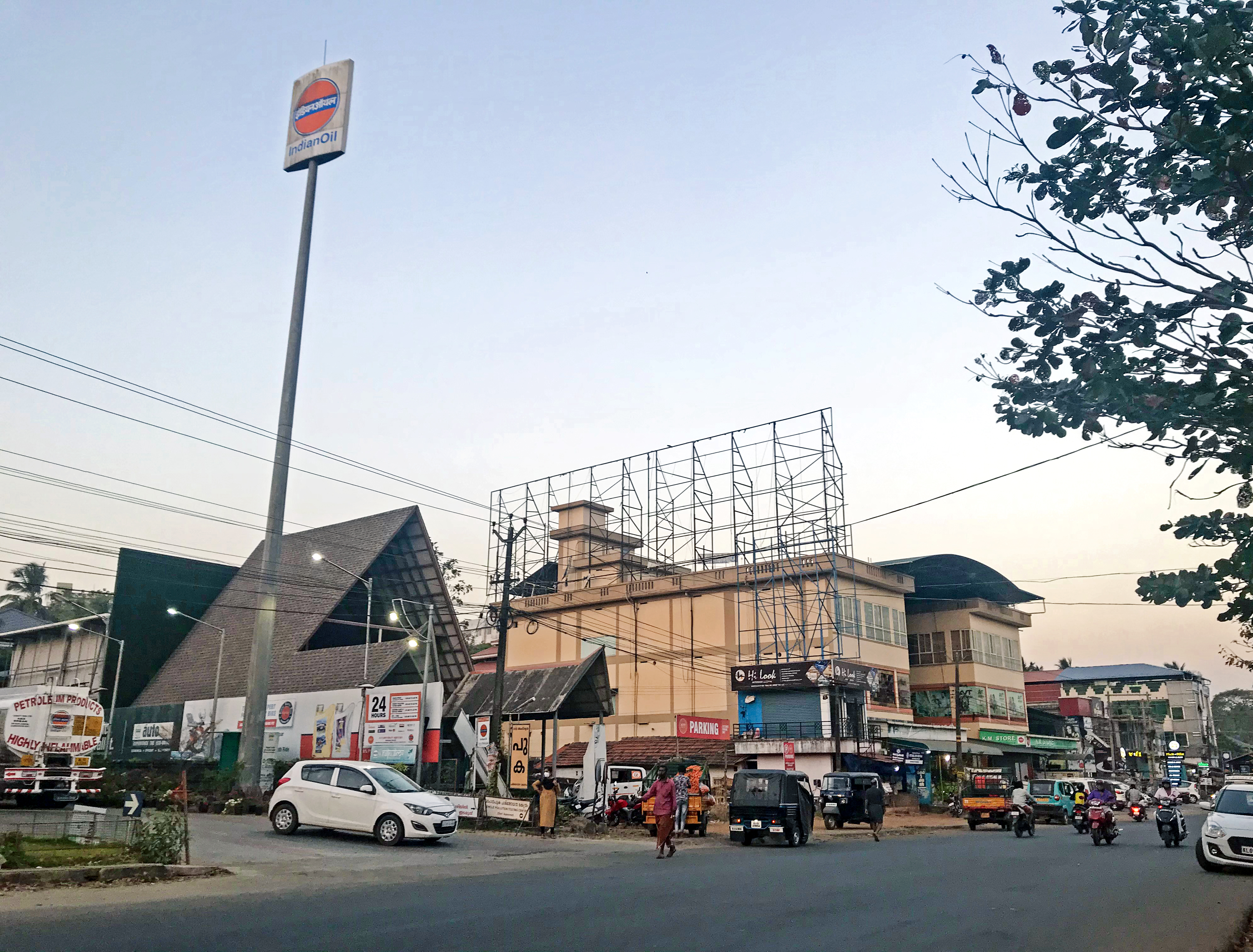
- Vaniyamkulam town
- Country: India
- State: Kerala
- District: Palakkad

Population (2011)
  - Total: 15,965

Languages
  - Official: Malayalam, English
- Time zone: UTC+5:30 (IST)
- PIN: 6XXXXX
- Vehicle registration: KL-

Vaniyamkulam-I is a town in the Palakkad district, state of Kerala, India. Together with Vaniyamkulam-II, it forms a part of the Vaniamkulam gram panchayat.

== Demographics ==
As of 2011 India census, Vaniyamkulam-I had a population of 15,965 with 7,569 males and 8,396 females.
