= Vaniamkulam Gram Panchayat =

Gram Panchayat in Palakkad district of Kerala, India

Vaniamkulam is a gram panchayat in the Palakkad district, state of Kerala, India. It is the local government organisation that serves the villages of Vaniyamkulam-I and Vaniyamkulam-II.
