= All-India Services Act, 1951 =

Indian legislation

- Emblem of India

Parliament of India
- Long title: An Act to regulate the recruitment, and the conditions of service of persons appointed, to the All-India Services common to the Union and the States.
- Citation: No. 61 of 1951
- Territorial extent: Whole of India
- Enacted by: Parliament of India
- Assented to: 29 October 1951 (by the President of India, Rajendra Prasad)
- Commenced: 29 October 1951
- Effective: 29 October 1951

Amended by
- The All India Services (Amendment) Act, 1958 (Act no. 25 of 1963); The All India Services (Amendment) Act, 1963 (Act no. 25 of 1963); The All India Services (Amendment) Act, 1975 (Act no. 19 of 1975); The All India Services Regulations (Indemnity) Act, 1975 (Act no. 25 of 1975)

Summary
- Creates All India Services, namely, the Indian Administrative Service (IAS) and the Indian Police Service (IPS), Indian Forest Service (IFS) as per the articles 312, 313, and 314 of the Constitution of India.
- Status: Amended

The All-India Services Act, 1951 (IAST: Akhila Bhāratīya Sevāem Adhiniyama, 1951) is an Indian legislation. The act established two All India Services and provides for the creation of three more.

== History ==
During the occupation of India by the East India Company, the civil services were divided into three — covenanted, uncovenanted and special civil services. The covenanted civil service, or the Honourable East India Company's Civil Service (HEICCS), as it was called, largely consisted of British civil servants occupying the senior posts in the government. The uncovenanted civil service was solely introduced to facilitate the entry of Indians into the lower rung of the administration. The special service consisted of specialised departments, such as the Indian Forest Service, Indian Police and Indian Political Service, whose ranks were drawn from either the covenanted civil services or the British Indian Army. The Indian Police ranked many British Indian Army officers among its members, although after 1893, an annual exam was used to select its officers. In 1858, the HEICCS was replaced by the Indian Civil Service (ICS), which became the highest civil service in British-ruled India between 1858 and 1947. The last British appointments to the ICS were made in 1942.

With the passing of the Government of India Act, 1919, the Imperial Services — under the oversight of the Secretary of State for India — were split into two arms, the All India Services and the Central Services. The Imperial Civil Service was one of the ten All India Services.

In 1946, at the Premier's Conference, the then-Central Cabinet decided to form the Indian Administrative Service (IAS), based on the Imperial Civil Service (ICS); and the Indian Police Service (IPS), based on the Imperial Police (IP).

There is no alternative to this administrative system... If you do not adopt this course, then do not follow the present Constitution. Substitute something else... these people are the instrument. Remove them and I see nothing but a picture of chaos all over the country.

— Sardar Vallabhbhai Patel in the Constituent Assembly of India discussing the role of All India Services.,

When India was partitioned following the departure of the British in 1947, the Imperial Civil Service was divided between the new dominions of India and Pakistan. The Indian remnant of the ICS was named the Indian Administrative Service, while the Pakistan remnant was named the Pakistan Administrative Service (PAS). The modern Indian Administrative Service and Indian Police Service were created under the Article 312(2) in part XIV of the Constitution of India, and the All India Services Act, 1951.

== Provisions ==
The Act creates two All India Services as per Article 312(2) in part XIV of the Constitution of India, namely, the Indian Administrative Service (IAS) and the Indian Police Service (IPS).

The act — subject to a two-thirds majority (supermajority) in the Rajya Sabha — also provides for the creation of three more All India Services, namely, the Indian Engineering Service, the Indian Forest Service, and Indian Medical and Health Service. Of these, only the Indian Forest Service was created under the All India Services Act, 1951 in 1966.

== Amendments ==
The All India Services Act, 1951 has been amended four times.

Amendments to the All India Services Act, 1951
No.	Short title	Citation	Status
1	The All India Services (Amendment) Act, 1958	Act no. 25 of 1963	In force
2	The All India Services (Amendment) Act, 1963	Act no. 25 of 1963	In force
3	The All India Services (Amendment) Act, 1975	Act no. 19 of 1975	Repealed
4.	The All India Services Regulations (Indemnity) Act, 1975	Act no. 25 of 1975	Repealed

== Bibliography ==
=== Books ===
- Tummala, Krishna Kumar (1996). Public Administration in India. Mumbai: Allied Publishers. ISBN 978-8170235903. OCLC 313439426.
- Chesney, George Tomkyns (2016) [1870]. Indian Polity: A view of system of administration in India (classic reprint). London: Forgotten Books (published 8 December 2017). ISBN 978-1333187644. OCLC 982769345.
- Sabharwal, Meghna; Berman, Evan M., eds. (2013). Public Administration in South Asia: India, Bangladesh, and Pakistan (Public Administration and Public Policy) (1st ed.). Abingdon-on-Thames: Routledge. ISBN 978-1439869116. OCLC 1004349979.
- Goel, S.L.; Rajneesh, Shalini (2002). Public Personnel Administration : Theory and Practice. Foreword by Vasundhara Raje. Delhi: Deep and Deep Publications. ISBN 978-8176293952. OCLC 51300460.
- Ghose, Bhaskar (2011). The Service of the State: The IAS Reconsidered. New Delhi: Penguin Group (published 9 June 2011). ISBN 978-0670083817. OCLC 986241038.

=== Paper ===
- Baswan, B. S.; Barik, R. K.; Ali, Akber; Singh, Pankaj Kumar (2016). "To take a comprehensive look at the requirement of IAS officers over a longer time frame" (PDF). Department of Personnel and Training, Government of India. New Delhi: Indian Institute of Public Administration.
