= Indira Gandhi National Forest Academy =

Forestry training institute in India

- इंदिरा गांधी राष्ट्रीय वन अकादमी
- Former names: Indian Forest College
- Motto: "अरण्यः ते पृथ्वी स्योनमस्तु"(Sanskrit) (Aranyam Te Prithivi Syo Namastu)
- Motto in English: "The Forest is Earth's delight"
- Type: Forest Service Training Institute
- Established: 1938 as Indian Forest College; 1987 as IGNFA
- Parent institution: Ministry of Environment, Forests and Climate Change
- Affiliations: Government of India
- Budget: ₹83.80 crore (US$8.7 million) (2025–26)
- Director: Bharati, IFS
- Location: Dehradun, Uttarakhand, India
- Campus: Dehradun
- Website: www.ignfa.gov.in

Indira Gandhi National Forest Academy (IGNFA) is a forest service training institute under the Ministry of Environment and Forests of India, which was originally called as Indian Forest College, established in 1938 for training of senior forest officers. The institute trains Indian Forest Service (IFS) officers before they are sent to their respective state cadres to carry out their duties.It is situated in the New Forest campus of Forest Research Institute (FRI), Dehradun.

The primary mandate of the academy is to impart knowledge and skills to the professional foresters and help them to develop competence for managing the country's forest and wildlife resources on a sustainable basis. In the academy training is provided at different levels of seniority in the Indian Forest Service besides training the new entrants to the service.

== History ==
The academy was constituted in the year 1987 by renaming the Indian Forest College, which was established in 1938 for training senior forest officers. On 25 May 1987, Indian Forest College upgraded to National Forest Academy through a resolution and given a formal name "Indira Gandhi National Forest Academy". The Indira Gandhi National Forest Academy (IGNFA) stands as a prestigious institution in India, dedicated to the training and professional development of forestry officers and other stakeholders in forest management.

== Training programmes ==
1. Professional Forestry training for IFS Probationers through a series of class room sessions, tours, excursions and specialized modules. It nurtures young foresters capable of making difference in the management of ecological assets of our country besides inculcating human values and professional ethics amongst them. After completion of 4 months of foundation course at Lal Bahadur Shastri National Academy of Administration (LBSNAA), OTs (Officer Trainees) come for 13 months of professional training in the academy (Phase 1). After completion of 4 months of ON-job-training in respective cadres, training of 3 months is given (Phase 2).
2. Skill Upgradation Programme for State Forest Service (SFS) officers inducted into IFS to sensitize and orient them to the ethos and functioning of All India Services and to keep them abreast with the rapidly changing scenario of forest management, development and administration.
3. Mid Career Training (MCT) programme for IFS officers in three phases of the service viz III, IV and V meant for the seniority 7 to 9, 16 to 18 and 26 to 28 years respectively. It aims to provide best training opportunities to the officers by roping in some of the leading training institutions in the country and abroad. The officers get a chance to interact with the experts of respective fields and also get exposure to best management practices of natural resources in the foreign countries.
4. Training programmes and workshops for the three All India Services, members of Higher Judiciary, exposure to Officer Trainees of other services with an endeavour to provide a platform for sharing experiences and new learnings in the field of forest management.

== Location ==
It is situated in the New Forest campus of Forest Research Institute (FRI) on Chakrata Road (NH-72), five kilometers from Dehradun town. The 1100 acres campus is bounded by the river Tons in the north and Chakrata road on the south. Large parts of the campus are still covered with natural forest and dense experimental plantations. The campus is situated at an altitude of 670 m. above mean sea level and receives over 200 cm of rainfall annually. It can be best approached from Dehradun city through Chakrata road.

The hostels, guest house, auditorium and playgrounds of the academy are also located in the campus, whereas the housing colony for the faculty and staff is located on Chakrata road opposite the New Forest campus.

== See also ==
- Forest Research Institute (India)
- Indian Council of Forestry Research and Education
- Van Vigyan Kendra (VVK)-Forest Science Centres
- Indian Forest Service
- Head of Forest Forces
