= Gujarat Forest Department =

Gujarat state agency

Agency overview
- Jurisdiction: Government of Gujarat
- Headquarters: Gandhinagar, Gujarat, India
- Agency executive: Dr. Rajiv Kumar Gupta, IAS, Principal Chief Conservator of Forests (Head of Forest Force)
- Website: Official Website

The Gujarat Forest Department is the governmental agency responsible for the management and conservation of forests and wildlife in the Indian state of Gujarat. Headquartered in Gandhinagar, the department plays a crucial role in preserving the state's rich biodiversity, promoting afforestation, and implementing sustainable forest management practices.

== History ==
The department traces its origins to the establishment of forest administrations during the British colonial era. Over the years, it has evolved to address contemporary challenges related to deforestation, habitat loss, and wildlife conservation.

== Functions and responsibilities ==
The Gujarat Forest Department is tasked with various functions, including:

- Protection and management of forest resources
- Wildlife conservation and habitat restoration
- Promotion of afforestation and sustainable forest management practices
- Prevention and control of forest fires and illegal logging
- Eco-tourism development and community engagement initiatives

== Organizational structure ==
The department is headed by the Principal Chief Conservator of Forests, who oversees a hierarchical structure comprising various divisions, circles, and range offices spread across the state.

== Conservation initiatives ==
Gujarat Forest Department actively participates in conservation initiatives such as the Gir Lion Conservation Project, which focuses on the protection and welfare of Asiatic lions in the Gir Forest National Park and surrounding areas.

== See also ==
- Forest Departments of India
- Gir Forest National Park
