= Indian Administrative Service =

Senior civil service of India

- भारतीय प्रशासनिक सेवा
- Official Emblem of Agency

Agency overview
- Formed: 26 January 1950; 76 years ago
- Type: Civil service
- Jurisdiction: Republic of India
- Headquarters: North Block, New Delhi
- Motto: योगः कर्मसु कौशलम् (Excellence in Action)
- Employees: 4,926 officers (3,511 officers directly recruited by the Union Public Service Commission and 1,415 officers promoted from state civil services)
- Minister responsible: PM, Minister of Personnel, Public Grievances and Pensions
- Agency executive: T. V. Somanathan, Cabinet Secretary; Lal Bahadur Shastri National Academy of Administration
- Parent department: Ministry of Personnel, Public Grievances and Pensions; Department of Personnel and Training (AIS Division)
- Child agency: Union Public Service Commission
- Key document: Article 312, Constitution of India
- Website: https://iascivillist.dopt.gov.in/

The Indian Administrative Service (IAS) is the senior administrative civil service of the Government of India and one of the three All India Services, along with the Indian Police Service (IPS) and the Indian Forest Service (IFS). Members of these three services serve the Government of India as well as the individual states. IAS officers are also deployed to constitutional bodies, staff and line agencies, auxiliary bodies, public sector undertakings, regulatory bodies, statutory bodies, and autonomous bodies.

As in other countries with a parliamentary system of government, the IAS is part of India's permanent bureaucracy and an inseparable part of the Government of India's executive branch. It is expected to remain politically neutral and provide administrative continuity across ruling parties or coalitions. Official commissions and researchers have documented frequent political interference in practice, particularly through transfers.

Upon confirmation of service, an IAS officer serves a probationary period as a sub-divisional magistrate in the state government. After completing this probation, the officer moves into an administrative role in a district as a district magistrate and collector, a role that lasts several years. After this tenure, an officer may be promoted to head a whole state administrative division as a divisional commissioner, or director/commissioner of a department.

About 180 officers are recruited each year, mainly through the Civil Services Examination (CSE); on 01 January 2025, 5,577 officers were in service against a sanctioned strength of 6,877. Debates about the service centre on political interference, accountability and corruption, and on whether a generalist service suits specialised modern governance, a concern that led to limited lateral entry in 2018, which was later cancelled following pressure from opposition parties over lack of reservations. The government maintains that it has not abandoned lateral entry.

At the higher levels of the pay matrix, IAS officers may lead government departments or ministries. In these roles, IAS officers represent the country internationally in bilateral and multilateral negotiations. While on deputation, they may serve in International organisations such as the World Bank, the International Monetary Fund, the United Nations, or its agencies. They also help conduct elections in India, as mandated by the Election Commission of India.

== History ==
During the East India Company period, the civil services were classified into three – covenanted, uncovenanted and special civil services. The covenanted civil service, or the Honourable East India Company's Civil Service (HEICCS), as it was called, largely comprised civil servants in senior government posts. The uncovenanted civil service was introduced solely to facilitate Indians' entry into the lower rung of the administration. The special service comprised specialised departments, such as the Indian Forest Service, the Imperial Police and the Indian Political Department, whose ranks were drawn from either the covenanted civil service or the Indian Army. The Imperial Police included many Indian Army officers, although after 1893 an annual exam was used to select its officers. In 1858 the HEICCS was replaced by the Indian Civil Service (ICS), which became the highest civil service in India between 1858 and 1947. The last appointments to the ICS were made in 1942.

With the passing of the Government of India Act 1919 by the Parliament of the United Kingdom, the Indian civil services—under the general oversight of the Secretary of State for India—were split into two arms, the All India Services and the Central Services. The Indian Civil Service was one of the ten All India Services.

In 1946 at the Premier's Conference, the Central Cabinet decided to form the Indian Administrative Service, based on the Indian Civil Service; and the Indian Police Service, based on the Imperial Police.

There is no alternative to this administrative system... The Union will go, you will not have a united India if you do not have good All-India Service which has the independence to speak out its mind, which has [the] sense of security that you will standby [sic] your work... If you do not adopt this course, then do not follow the present Constitution. Substitute something else... these people are the instrument. Remove them and I see nothing but a picture of chaos all over the country.

— Vallabhbhai Patel in the Constituent Assembly of India discussing the role of All India Services.,

When India was partitioned after the British left in 1947, the Indian Civil Service was divided between the new dominions of India and Pakistan. The Indian remnant of the ICS was named the Indian Administrative Service, while the Pakistan remnant was named the District Management Group (later renamed to Pakistan Administrative Service in 2012). The modern Indian Administrative Service was created under Article 312(2) in Part XIV of the Constitution of India, and the All India Services Act, 1951.

== Indian Frontier Administrative Service ==
A special cadre, the Indian Frontier Administrative Service, was created in 1954 at the suggestion of prime minister Jawaharlal Nehru to administer the North-East Frontier Agency (now Arunachal Pradesh) and later other parts of north-east India. It was placed under the Ministry of External Affairs and merged with the IAS in 1968.

== Recruitment ==
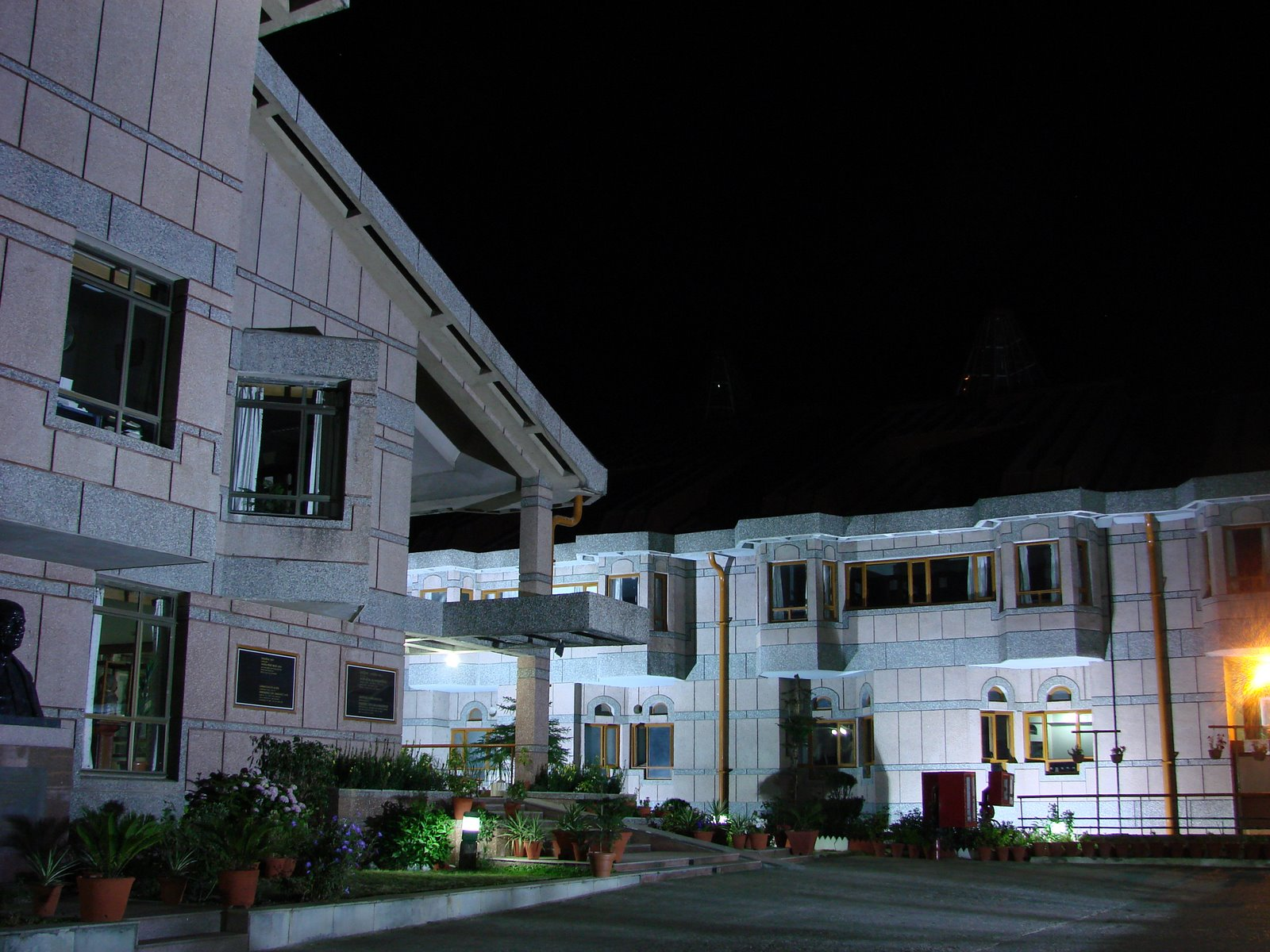
The Lal Bahadur Shastri National Academy of Administration in Mussoorie, Uttarakhand is the staff training college of the IAS.

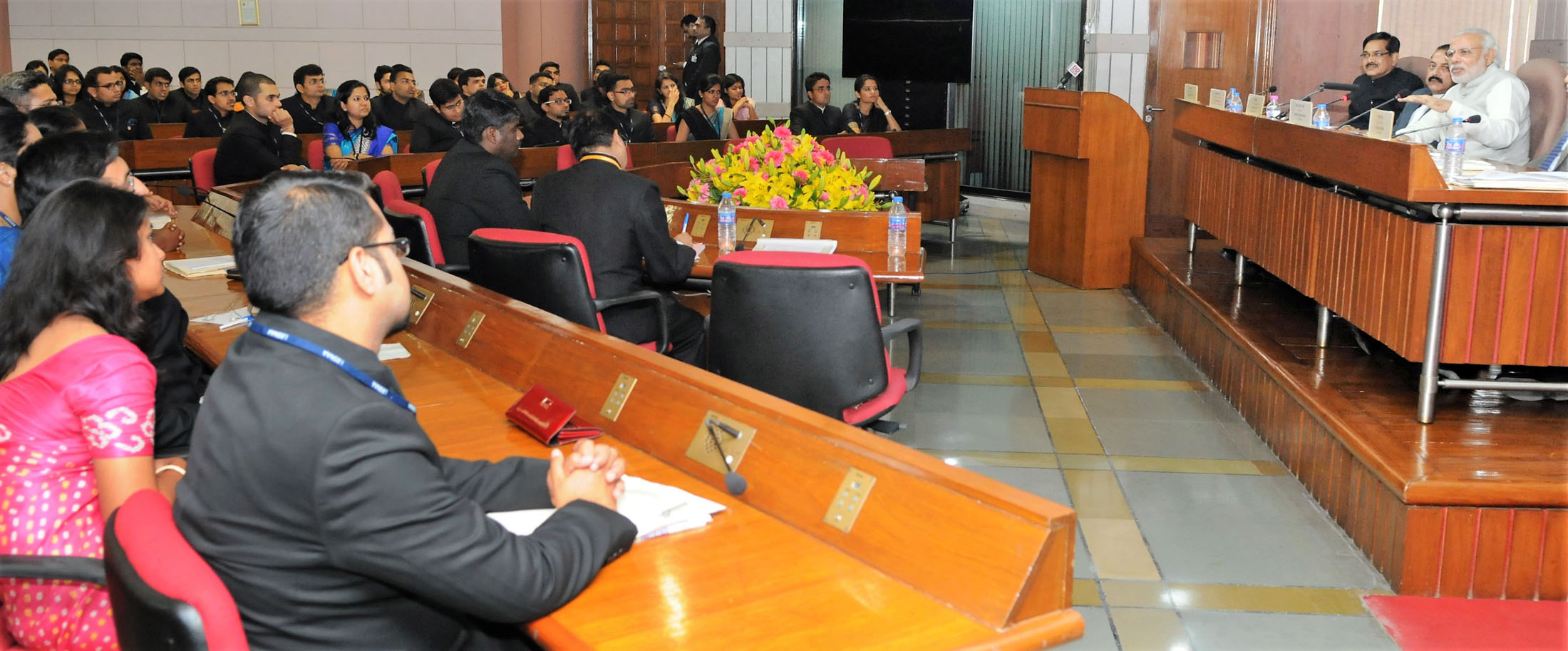
Prime Minister of India, Narendra Modi, interacting with IAS officers (on probation)

There are three ways to join the IAS. One can enter the IAS by passing the Civil Services Examination, conducted by the Union Public Service Commission (UPSC). Officers recruited this way are called direct recruits or regular recruits (RR). Some officers are also recruited from the state civil services, and, in rare cases, selected from non-state civil services. The ratio between direct recruits and promotees is fixed at 2:1. All officers, regardless of the mode of entry, are appointed by the President of India.

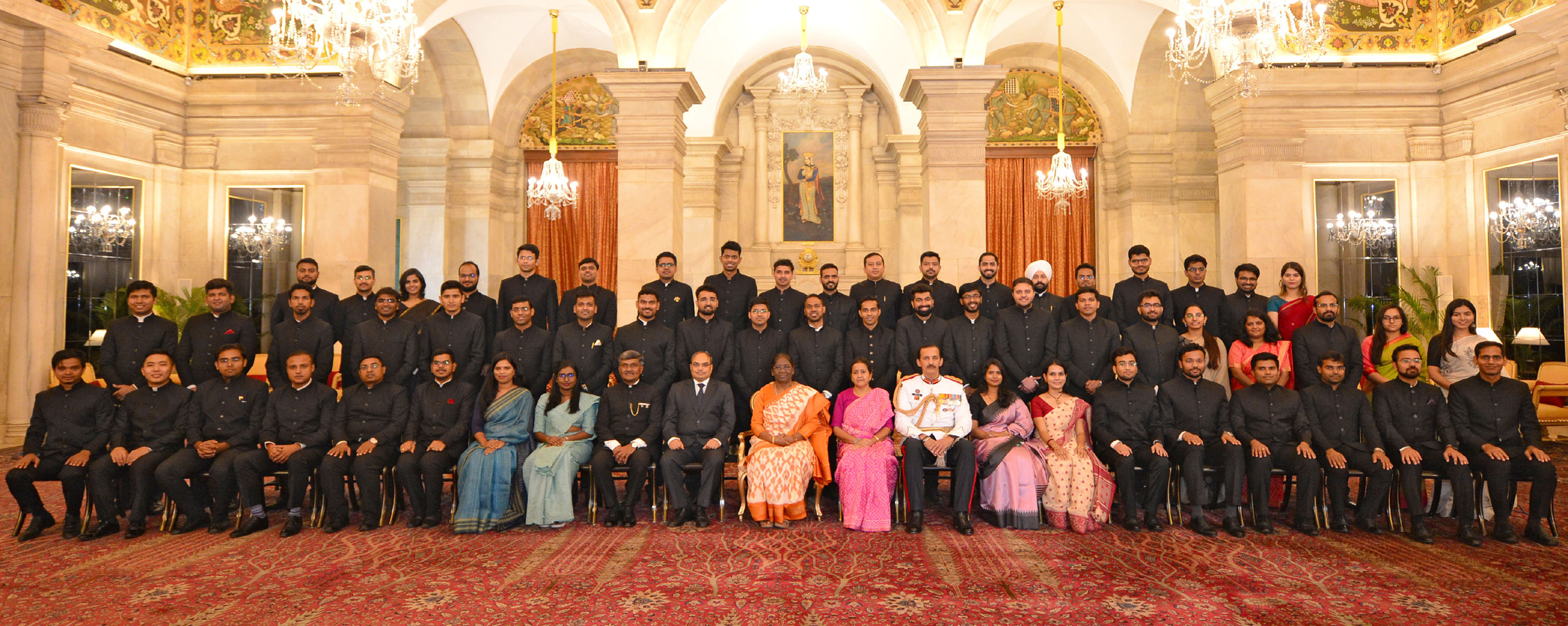
President Murmu with a group of IAS officers (2020 batch) at Rashtrapati Bhavan, in New Delhi

Only about 180 candidates out of over 1 million applicants who apply through CSE are successful, a success rate of less than 0.02 per cent.

Unlike candidates appointed to other civil services, a successful IAS candidate is rendered ineligible to retake the CSE. From 1951 to 1978, an IAS/IFS candidate had to submit two additional papers along with three optional papers (instead of just the three optional papers like for other civil services) to be eligible. The two additional papers were postgraduate-level submissions, compared with the graduate-level optional papers, and this distinction gave IAS and IFS officers a higher status. The two postgraduate-level submissions were later removed, but this has not changed the perceived higher status of the IAS and IFS. After selection, successful candidates undergo training at the Lal Bahadur Shastri National Academy of Administration in Mussoorie, Uttarakhand.

=== State cadres ===
==== Current cadre allocation policy ====
The central government announced a new cadre allocation policy for the All India Services in August 2017, claiming it would ensure national integration of the bureaucracy and an all-India character for the services. The Department of Personnel and Training was to divide the existing twenty-six cadres into five zones. Under the new policy, a candidate first selects their zones of preference, in descending order, then indicates a cadre preference from each preferred zone. The candidate then indicates their second cadre preference for each preferred zone. The zone and cadre preferences remain in the same order, and no change is permitted. Officers remain in their allocated cadre or are deputed to the Government of India.

Zones under the current cadre allocation policy
Zone	Cadres
Zone-I	AGMUT (Arunachal Pradesh-Goa-Mizoram and Union Territories including erstwhile state of Jammu and Kashmir), Himachal Pradesh, Uttarakhand, Punjab, Rajasthan and Haryana.
Zone-II	Uttar Pradesh, Bihar, Jharkhand and Odisha.
Zone-III	Gujarat, Maharashtra, Madhya Pradesh and Chhattisgarh.
Zone-IV	West Bengal, Sikkim, Assam-Meghalaya, Manipur, Tripura and Nagaland.
Zone-V	Telangana, Andhra Pradesh, Karnataka, Tamil Nadu and Kerala.

==== Previous cadre allocation policies ====
Until 2008, there was no formal system that permitted the selection of a state cadre preferred by the candidate. If the candidate was not placed in a vacancy in their home state, they would be allocated to other states, which were selected from a roster in alphabetic order, starting from 'A', 'H', 'M' or 'T', depending on the year. For example, if in a particular year the roster begins from 'A', then the first candidate on the roster will go to the Andhra Pradesh state cadre, the next one to Bihar, and then to Chhattisgarh, Gujarat and so on in alphabetical order. The next year the roster starts from 'H', for either Haryana or Himachal Pradesh (the two states alternate roster years). This system, practiced since the mid-1980s, ensured that officers from different states were placed all over India.

The system of permanent state cadres resulted in wide disparities of professional exposure for officers when comparing those from developed versus less developed states. Changes in state cadres were only permitted on grounds of marriage to an All India Services officer of another state cadre or under other exceptional circumstances. The officers were allowed to go to their home state cadre on deputation for a limited period after which they would be required to return to their allocated cadre.

From 2008, IAS officers were assigned to state cadres at the beginning of their service. There was one cadre for each Indian state, except for two joint cadres: Assam–Meghalaya and Arunachal Pradesh–Goa–Mizoram–Union Territories (AGMUT). The "insider-outsider ratio" (ratio of officers who were posted to their home states to those from other states) was maintained at 1:2, with one-third of the direct recruits being 'insiders' from the same state. The rest were posted as outsiders according to the state allocation roster in states other than their home states, as indicated by their preference.

== Responsibilities of an IAS officer ==
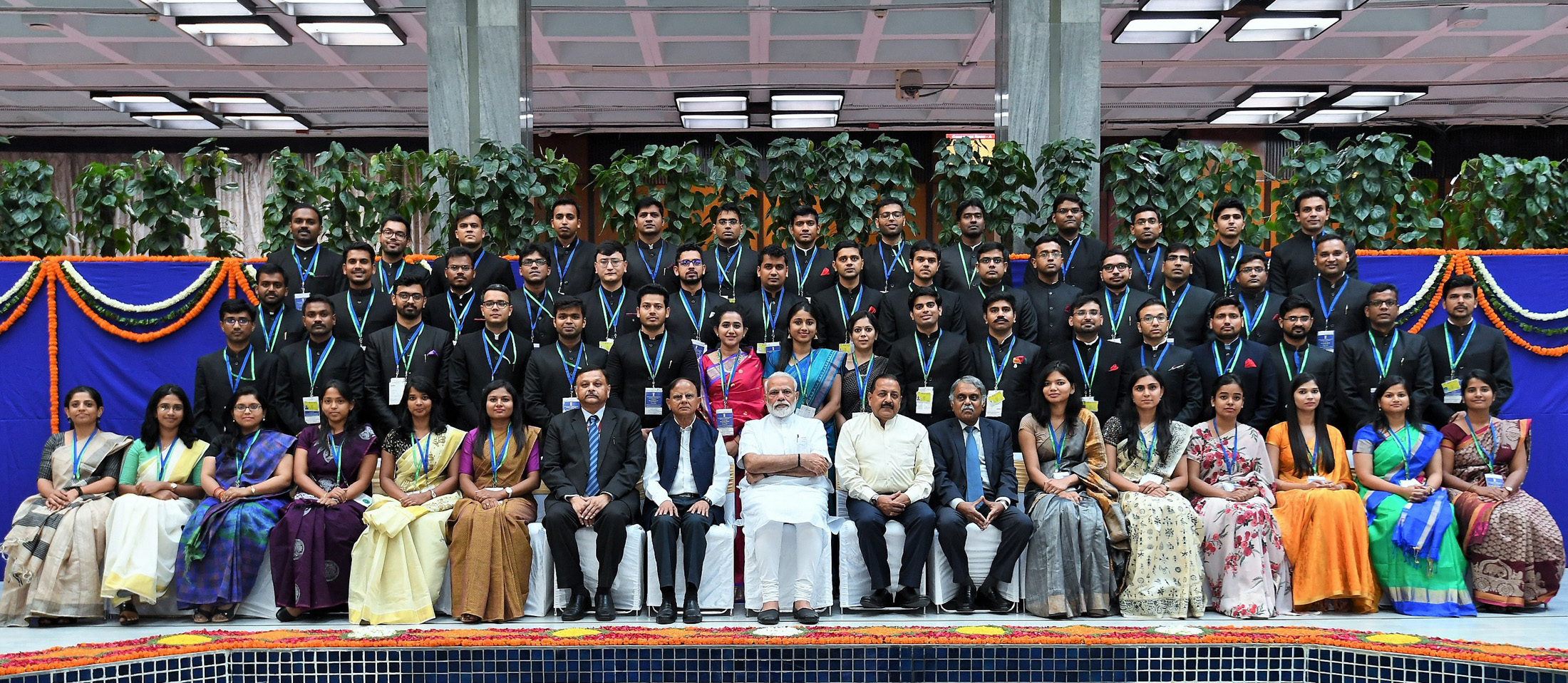
The Prime Minister with IAS officers of 2017 batch in New Delhi

The typical functions performed by an IAS officer are:

- To collect land revenue and function as court officials in matters of land revenue (for the revenue courts), to maintain law and order, to implement union and state government policies at the grass-roots level when posted to field positions i.e. as Sub-divisional magistrate, Additional District Magistrate, District magistrate and Divisional commissioner, and to act as an agent of the government in the field, i.e. to act as an intermediary between the public and the government.
- To implement government policies, to execute government decisions, to oversee the day-to-day administration and serve as the head of the department, to coordinate with other departments/agencies, to represent the department when posted as Director/Commissioner of a Directorate/Commissionerate/Department.
- To handle the administration and daily proceedings of the government, including the formulation and implementation of policy in consultation with the minister-in-charge of a specific ministry or department.
- To contribute to policy formulation, and to make a final decision in certain matters, with the agreement of the minister concerned or the council of ministers (depending upon the weight of the matter), when posted at the higher level in the Government of India as a joint secretary, additional secretary, special secretary or secretary equivalent, secretary and Cabinet Secretary, and in state governments as secretary, principal secretary, additional chief secretary or special chief secretary and chief secretary.

== Career progression ==
At the start of their careers, IAS officers receive district training with their home cadres, followed by their first posting. Their initial role is assistant collector cum sub-divisional magistrate, and they are placed in charge of a district sub-division. As assistant collector cum sub-divisional magistrate, they are entrusted with land revenue administration, maintaining law and order, and general administration and development work in the sub-district.

After completing probation, they take an executive role in a district as a district collector cum district magistrate, which lasts several years. After this tenure as a district magistrate, district collector, or deputy commissioner, they can be posted to various positions in the state government. These positions include secretary or principal secretary in different departments, director of a department, divisional commissioner, or chairman of a government corporation. The specific positions depend on the officer's seniority, experience, and performance. The highest positions that an IAS officer can attain include chief secretary of a state or cabinet secretary of the country.

In 2015, it was announced that a new designation of assistant secretary at the Central Secretariat had been created to enable new IAS officers to be posted to Delhi for a three-month assignment as part of their training regime. Previously, they were permitted to go on deputation only after nine years of service in their home cadre and assignment to the Central Secretariat. It was observed that these deputations lacked experience in central functions, prompting this change in their training. As part of the new system, IAS assistant secretaries are supposed to work on projects—a new policy in their respective areas—and present them to their respective ministries; of all projects, 36 are selected to be presented before all secretaries of the Government of India; consequently, 16 are selected to be before the Cabinet Secretary, and a final eight are selected for presentation before the Prime Minister.

If serving on a deputation, they may be employed in International organisations such as the World Bank, the International Monetary Fund, the Asian Development Bank, the Asian Infrastructure Investment Bank, and the United Nations or its agencies. They also help conduct elections in India, as mandated by the Election Commission of India.

Positions and designations held by IAS officer in their career
Grade/scale (level on Pay Matrix)	Field posting(s)	Position in state governments	Position in the Government of India	Position on order of precedence in India	Pay Scale
Cabinet Secretary grade (Pay level 18)	—	—	Cabinet Secretary	11	₹250,000 (US$2,700) (PPP$11,700) (Note: Purchasing power parities (PPP) dollars for comparison.)
Apex scale (Pay level 17)	—	Chief secretary (Note: IAS officers of the designations additional chief secretary and special chief secretary draw same pay as the chief secretary of the state but not same protocol.)	Secretary/ Special Secretary (Note: IAS officers of the designation Special Secretary to the Government of India or secretary-equivalent draw the same pay as a secretary to the Government of India but not same protocol.) (Note: Subject to empanelment in union government)	23	₹225,000 (US$2,400)
Higher administrative grade (above super time scale) (Pay level 15)	Divisional commissioner (Note: Alternate designations – Regional commissioner, revenue divisional commissioner.) (Note: Alternate designations and nomenclature can differs from state to state.)	Principal Secretary to Government; Agricultural Production Commissioner	Additional secretary/ Director General	25	₹182,200 (US$1,900)—₹224,100 (US$2,400)
Senior administrative grade (above super time scale) (Pay level 14)	Divisional commissioner	Secretary to Government; Secretary to Governor; Commissioner / Director	Joint secretary	26	₹144,200 (US$1,500)—₹218,200 (US$2,300)
Selection grade (Pay level 13)	Collector cum District magistrate (Note: Alternate designations – District collector, district officer, deputy commissioner.)	Secretary to Government; Special secretary to Government; Director	Director		₹118,500 (US$1,300)—₹214,100 (US$2,300)
Junior administrative grade (Pay level 12)	Collector cum District magistrate	Joint secretary / Additional secretary	Deputy secretary		₹78,800 (US$840)—₹191,500 (US$2,000)
Senior time scale (Pay level 11)	Deputy Collector cum Additional District Magistrate (Note: Alternate designations – Chief development officer, district development officer, project director of DRDA, DUDA, IRDP etc., additional district collector, joint collector, additional deputy commissioner, CEO of zila parishad.)	Deputy secretary	Under Secretary		₹67,700 (US$720)—₹160,000 (US$1,700)
Junior time scale (Pay level 10)	Assistant Collector (U/T), Sub-Divisional Magistrate (Note: Alternate designations – Deputy collector, sub-divisional officer, sub-collector, joint magistrate, assistant commissioner)	Under Secretary	Assistant secretary (Note: Under training position; three-month assignment.)		₹56,100 (US$600)—₹132,000 (US$1,400)
Notes

Upon retirement, high ranking IAS officers have occupied constitutional posts such as the chief election commissioner of India, the comptroller and auditor general of India, and the chairperson of the Union Public Service Commission (UPSC). They have also become members of administrative tribunals, such as the National Green Tribunal and the Central Administrative Tribunal, as well as chiefs of regulators including the Telecom Regulatory Authority of India, the Securities and Exchange Board of India, and the Reserve Bank of India. If a serving IAS officer is appointed to a constitutional post such as Comptroller and Auditor General of India, Chief Election Commissioner of India or chairperson of UPSC or as head of a statutory authority, such as the National Commission for Women or the Central Information Commission, he or she is deemed to have retired from service.

IAS officers can also be deputed to private organisations for a fixed tenure under Rule 6(2)(ii) of the Indian Administrative Service (Cadre) Rules, 1954.

== Performance appraisal and accountability ==
The performance of IAS officers is assessed through an annual performance appraisal report under the All India Services (Performance Appraisal Report) Rules, 2007, which is reviewed before promotion or posting. Under rule 16(3), of the All India Services (Death-cum-Retirement Benefits) Rules, 1958, the government may retire an officer in public interest after 30 years of qualifying service, or at the age of 50. As officers enjoy strong constitutional protection against dismissal, critics argue that the service lacks effective consequences for poor performance. In 2020, the government launched Mission Karmyogi, a new capacity-building and performance evaluation programme for civil servants.

Criticisms of the country's bureaucracy have persisted over time, with detractors highlighting its cumbersome nature, slow decision-making processes, inefficiency, and instances of corruption. These deficiencies have become so widely acknowledged that the Indian bureaucracy often becomes the subject of relentless satirical portrayals in popular culture.

== Research and assessment ==
Researchers broadly agree that the service has high entry standards with uneven performance in office. Lant Pritchett described India as a "flailing state", in which a capable elite at the top fails to control implementation further down. Devesh Kapur argues that the Indian state performs well on large, time-bound tasks such as elections but poorly on routine service delivery, and that it is understaffed for its population rather than oversized. The Second Administrative Reforms Commission (2008) recommended fixed tenures and opening senior posts to competition, including from outside the service. Economists such as Gurcharan Das link the scope for rent-seeking to the wide discretion officers exercised over licences, land, and permits, especially before the 1991 reforms.

== Major concerns and reforms ==
=== Shortage of officers ===
In March 2026, the government informed the Lok Sabha that 1,300 of the 6,877 sanctioned IAS posts, about 19%, were vacant on 01 January 2025. The government has stated that the annual recruitment of IAS officers will not increase, to avoid affecting the career progression of existing officers and the overall structure of the service.

=== Lateral entry ===
Media personalities, some retired IAS officers and a few academics have argued in favour of lateral entry into the IAS to inject fresh blood into the service. They argue that it would help refresh the bureaucracy, offer competitiveness and bring in alternate perspectives. A counter-argument has been put forward that a lateral entry process could be manipulated due to corruption and cronyism. It is further argued that lateral entry would not lead to improvements in managerial performance or accountability, and while it may create synergy between the government and big businesses, it could also compromise the integrity of government. It has also been argued that it could weaken the bureaucracy instead. The union government has frequently ruled out lateral entry into the IAS.

=== Political influence ===
The IAS is hamstrung by political interference, outdated personnel procedures, and a mixed record on policy implementation, and it is in need of urgent reform. The Indian government should reshape recruitment and promotion processes, improve performance-based assessment of individual officers, and adopt safeguards that promote accountability while protecting bureaucrats from political meddling.

— Vaishnav Milan and Saksham Khosla, The Indian Administrative Service Meets Big Data, Carnegie Endowment for International Peace,

Several think tanks and media outlets have argued that the IAS is hamstrung by political influence within the service. It has been reported that many local political leaders have been seen to have interfered with IAS officers. Politicians have also exerted pressure on IAS officers by repeatedly transferring them, suspending them, beating them, and, in some extreme cases, killing them.

In 2012, Ashok Khemka, an IAS officer posted in Haryana, was reportedly transferred by the state Government under then Chief Minister Bhupinder Singh Hooda and faced a chargesheet, after preventing a land deal that involved Robert Vadra, husband of Congress leader Priyanka Gandhi and son-in-law of then Congress president Sonia Gandhi. Khemka, who retired in 2025, has been transferred over 50 times after exposing corruption in each department he was assigned to work.

In July 2013, Durga Shakti Nagpal, an IAS officer and bureaucrat from Uttar Pradesh, known for swift action against illegal sand mining, was suspended by Samajwadi Party leader and then Chief Minister Akhilesh Yadav, after she demolished a wall of an under-construction mosque in Jewar, as the construction was not cleared by the State Government. While Samajwadi Party leaders like Narendra Bhati and Azam Khan supported the decision to suspend her, the suspension order was met with protests and criticized by several social media users on Facebook and Twitter, including former IPS officer Kiran Bedi. Leaders from BSP and BJP, especially Nitin Gadkari, criticized the action. Nagpal's suspension was eventually revoked in September 2013 and was appointed as Joint Magistrate of Kanpur (Rural) the following month.

While hearing T. S. R. Subramanian v. Union of India, the Supreme Court of India ruled that IAS officers – and other civil servants – were not required to act on oral instructions given by politicians as they 'undermined credibility'.

=== Corruption ===
Several academic papers have shown IAS to be a significant contributor to crony capitalism in India. In 2015, it was reported by the Government of India that a hundred IAS officers had come under scrutiny by the Central Bureau of Investigation for alleged corruption. In 2017 Government records showed that 379 IAS officers had deliberately failed to submit details of their immovable assets (IPR). Since 2007, a number of chief secretaries and a principal secretary have been arrested in cases of graft or money laundering. IAS officers have been found amassing disproportionate assets and wealth varying from ₹200 crore (equivalent to ₹257 crore or US$27 million in 2026), to ₹800 crore (equivalent to ₹10 billion or US$110 million in 2026). In 2016 it was reported that the Government would provide the means to prosecute corrupt IAS officers, with the Ministry of Personnel, Public Grievances and Pensions agreeing to receive requests from private citizens seeking punitive measures against IAS officers even without supporting documentation.

In 2017, a Central Bureau of Investigation special court in Delhi sentenced a former Union Coal Secretary and two other IAS officers to two years in prison for their involvement in the coal allocation scam.

In 2017 it was reported by the Department of Personnel and Training, part of the Ministry of Personnel, Public Grievances and Pensions, that, since 2014, one IAS officer was prematurely retired from service, ten IAS officers had been deemed to have resigned, five had their pensions cut, and a further eight IAS officers suffered a cut in remuneration.

In 2018 the Union minister of state for personnel, public grievances and pensions, Jitendra Singh, informed the Lok Sabha that disciplinary proceedings were underway against 36 IAS officers. In 2020, Central Bureau of Investigation arrested two district magistrates in connection with an illegal arms license distribution scandal in the then Jammu & Kashmir state.

During year 2020–21, 581 corruption charges were filed against IAS officers. Further, a total of 753 complaints were received against the IAS officers in 2019-20 and 643 in 2018–19.

Former IAS officer and RBI governor D. Subbarao said 25% IAS officers are corrupt, incompetent or inefficient; middle 50% started well but have become complacent and only 25% are truly delivering, while discussing his book with the media platforms.

=== Abandonment of service ===
In June 2015, The Telegraph reported that twelve IAS officers had gone missing, and had not reported to either the union or the state government for their allocated cadre. It was believed that they were working in foreign countries for companies such as Microsoft for more lucrative pay. The Asian Age later reported that the services of three of the twelve officers were likely to be terminated due to "prolonged absence from service".

=== Misuse of reservation ===
Several IAS officers have been accused of misuse of reservation by means of submitting fraudulent documents and certificates, especially for disability or caste. This has led to their dismissal or suspension, even jail time for fraud. This has denied fair opportunities to deserving candidates who are truly poor and meritorious.

In July 2024, Abhishek Singh, a former IAS officer of 2011 batch was investigated over the veracity of his disability certificate. He had claimed the LD category reservation which includes conditions such as cerebral palsy, leprosy-cured, dwarfism, acid attack victims and muscular dystrophy.

In August 2024, Ravi Kumar Sihag, an IAS officer from Madhya Pradesh was investigated for falsifying his documents to avail the EWS reservation meant for economically backward applicants. Sihag has been accused of transferring multiple acres of land to a relative to avail the EWS quota defrauding the selection committee.

In September 2024, Puja Khedkar, an IAS officer of Maharashtra cadre from the 2023 batch, was dismissed and investigated, after she was found to have submitted fraudulent caste and disability documents and certificates. The Union Public Service Commission filed a case against her, canceled her candidature, and stated that Khedkar was guilty of acting in contravention of the provisions of the Civil Services Examination-2022 Rules, and that Khedkar allegedly demanded special privileges such as a separate office, house, car, and staff, which she was not entitled to as a probationary officer. In May 2025, Khedkar was granted anticipatory bail by the Supreme Court, on the conditions that she co-operate with the law enforcement on the investigation.

== Notable IAS officers ==
- Naresh Chandra; a retired 1956 batch IAS officer of Rajasthan cadre, who served as the Cabinet Secretary of India, Defence Secretary of India, Home Secretary of India, Water Resource Secretary of India and Indian Ambassador to the United States. He was awarded India's second-highest civilian honour, the Padma Vibhushan, for civil service, in 2007.
- Narinder Nath Vohra (N. N. Vohra); a retired 1959 batch IAS officer of Punjab cadre and the 12th Governor of the state of Jammu and Kashmir, Vohra was the first civilian Governor of Jammu and Kashmir in 18 years since Jagmohan. Vohra has also served as the Principal Secretary to the Prime Minister of India, Home Secretary of India, Defence Secretary of India and Defence Production Secretary of India. He was awarded India's second-highest civilian honour, the Padma Vibhushan, for civil service, in 2007.
- T. N. Seshan; a retired 1955 batch IAS officer of Tamil Nadu cadre, notable for enacting significant reforms to electoral oversight in India. He was the 10th Chief Election Commissioner of India (1990–96), who reformed elections by subduing electoral malpractice throughout the country and strengthened the image of the Election Commission of India. He previously served as the 18th Cabinet Secretary of India in 1989, and later as a member of the Planning Commission. He was presented the Ramon Magsaysay Award for government service in 1996.
- Y. V. Reddy; a retired 1964 batch IAS officer of Andhra Pradesh cadre. He was the 21st Governor of the Reserve Bank of India (RBI). He also served as the Fourteenth Finance Commission Chairman. Reddy was awarded India's second-highest civilian honour, the Padma Vibhushan, for civil service, in 2010.
- Vinod Rai; a retired 1972 batch IAS officer of Kerala cadre, who served as the 11th Comptroller and Auditor General of India. He is widely considered a symbol of the anti-corruption movement in India. He also served as the Financial Services Secretary of India. Rai was awarded India's third highest civilian honour, the Padma Bhushan, for civil service, in 2016.
- Duvvuri Subbarao; a retired 1972 batch IAS officer of Andhra Pradesh cadre. He served as the 22nd Governor of the Reserve Bank of India (RBI). A former Finance Secretary of India, he also served as a member of the Prime Minister's Economic Advisory Council, and as a senior economist in the World Bank. Subbarao's selection as RBI governor in 2008 was coincidental with the 2008 financial crisis. His leadership is generally credited with safeguarding the Indian economy through the 2008 financial crisis.
- Yogendra Narain; a retired 1965 batch IAS officer of Uttar Pradesh cadre. He is a former Secretary-General of Rajya Sabha, who also served as the Defence Secretary of India, Chief Secretary of Uttar Pradesh as well as Surface Transport Secretary of India. He was awarded the Dean Paul H. Appleby Award, for distinguished civil service, in 2017.
- Ashok Khemka, an IITian turned IAS officer of the batch of 1991, former Additional Chief Secretary in the Government of Haryana, who stood unshakably against corruption that the government transferred him over 66 times in his 34 years of service. He is one of the few IAS officers who carried integrity and faced one of highest number of transfers in their career.

== See also ==
- Bureaucracy
- Technocracy
- Indian Police Service
- Indian Foreign Service
- Indian Revenue Service
- Indian Economic Service
- All India Service
- Central Civil Services
- Civil Services of India
- NITI Aayog
- EAC-PM
- Prime Minister's Office
- Union Public Service Commission

== Bibliography ==
=== Books ===
- Ghose, Bhaskar (9 June 2011). The Service of the State: The IAS Reconsidered. New Delhi: Penguin Group. ISBN 978-0-670-08381-7. OCLC 986241038.
- Chesney, George Tomkyns (8 December 2017) [1870]. Indian Polity: A view of system of administration in India (classic reprint). London: Forgotten Books. ISBN 978-1-333-18764-4. OCLC 982769345.
- Chattopadhyaya, Haraprasad; Baghel, Indu (2015). Indian Administration. New Delhi: Global Vision Publishing House. ISBN 978-81-8220-713-4. OCLC 927511141.
- Tummala, Krishna Kumar (1996). Public Administration in India. Mumbai: Allied Publishers. ISBN 978-81-7023-590-3. OCLC 313439426.
- Laxmikanth, M. (25 August 2014). Governance in India (2nd ed.). Noida: McGraw-Hill Education. ISBN 978-93-392-0478-5.
- Sabharwal, Meghna; Berman, Evan M., eds. (2013). Public Administration in South Asia: India, Bangladesh, and Pakistan (Public Administration and Public Policy). Abingdon-on-Thames: Routledge. ISBN 978-1-4398-6911-6. OCLC 1004349979.
- Goel, S.L.; Rajneesh, Shalini (2002). Public Personnel Administration: Theory and Practice. Foreword by Vasundhara Raje. Delhi: Deep and Deep Publications. ISBN 978-81-7629-395-2. OCLC 51300460.
- Saxena, Vaishali (2003). Bureaucracy on Wheels: Trauma of Transfers in the Indian Administrative Service. Jaipur: Aalekh Publishers. ISBN 978-81-87359-21-0. OCLC 191202280.
- Malik, Yogendra K.; Kennedy, Charles H.; Oberst, Robert C.; Kapur, Ashok; Lawoti, Mahendra; Rahman, Syedur (7 September 2001). Government And Politics In South Asia (5th ed.). Boulder, Colorado: Westview Press (now Routledge). ISBN 978-0-8133-3901-6. OCLC 945072906.

=== Papers ===
- Baswan, B. S.; Barik, R. K.; Ali, Akber; Singh, Pankaj Kumar (2016). "To take a comprehensive look at the requirement of IAS officers over a longer time frame" (PDF). Department of Personnel and Training, Government of India. New Delhi: Indian Institute of Public Administration.
- Banik, Dan (1 June 2001). "The transfer raj: Indian civil servants on the move". The European Journal of Development Research. 13 (1): 106–134. doi:10.1080/09578810108426783. ISSN 0957-8811. OCLC 55042966. S2CID 154680293.
- Vaishnav, Milan; Khosla, Saksham (1 September 2016). "The Indian Administrative Service Meets Big Data" (PDF). Carnegie Endowment for International Peace.
- Schiavo-Campo, Salvatore; Tommaso, de Giulio; Mukherjee, Amitabha (1999). Government Employment and Pay: A Global and Regional Perspective. Washington D. C.: World Bank. OCLC 913715804.
