= Forestry in India =

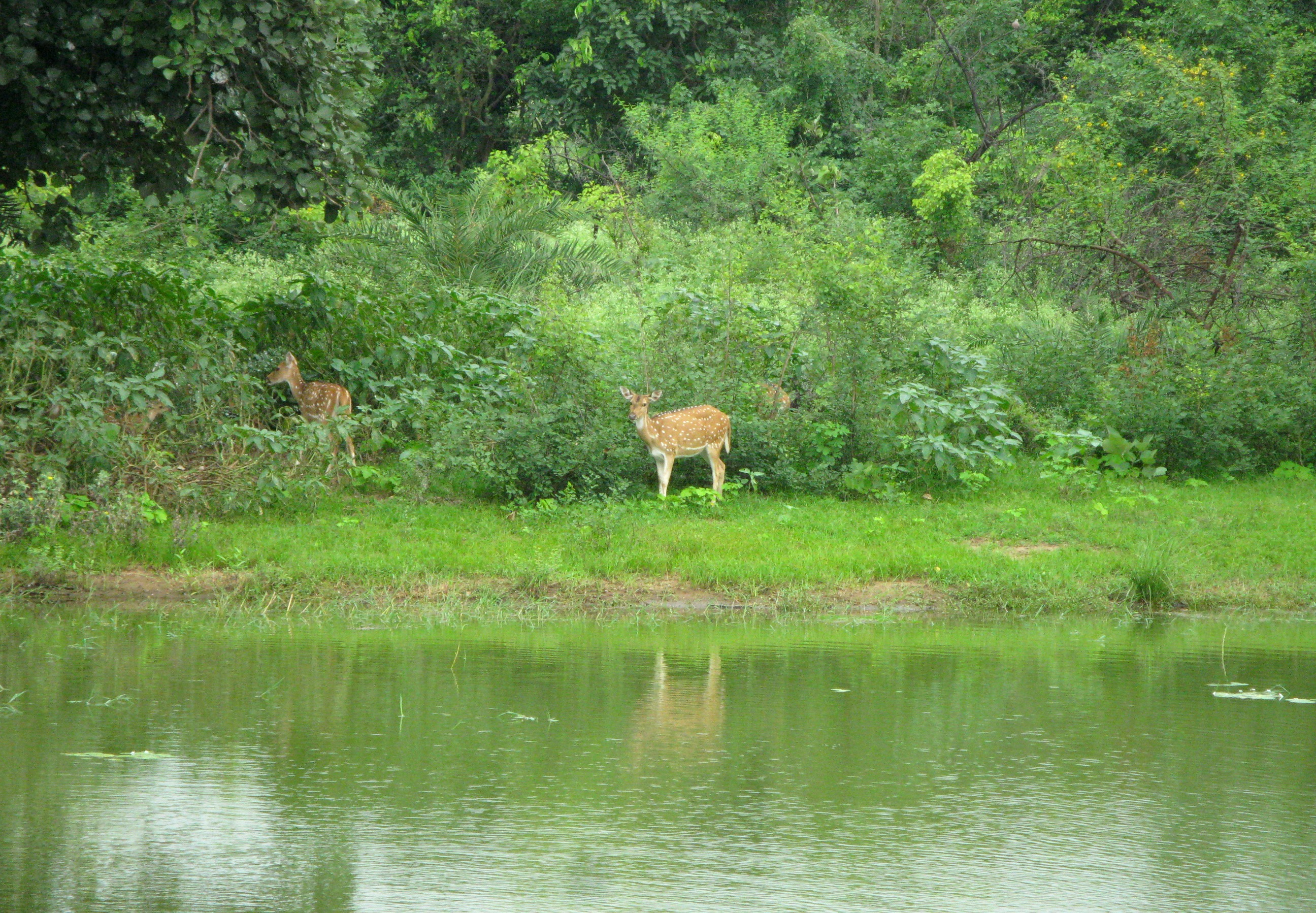
Madhya Pradesh has the largest forest cover in India. Above is the protected forest in Van Vihar National Park.

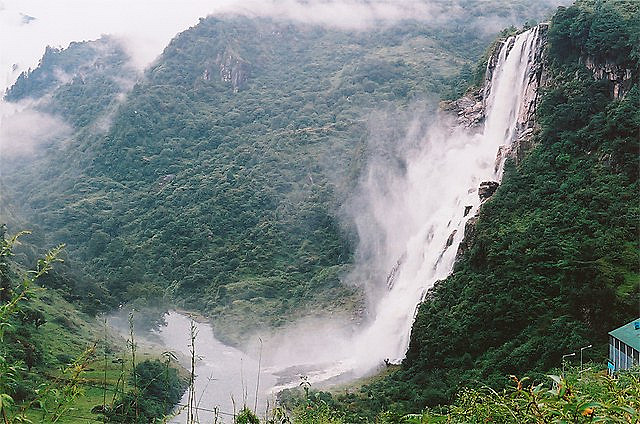
Arunachal Pradesh has the 2nd largest forest cover in India, and its largest primary forest cover. Above is Nuranang Falls on the way to Tawang.

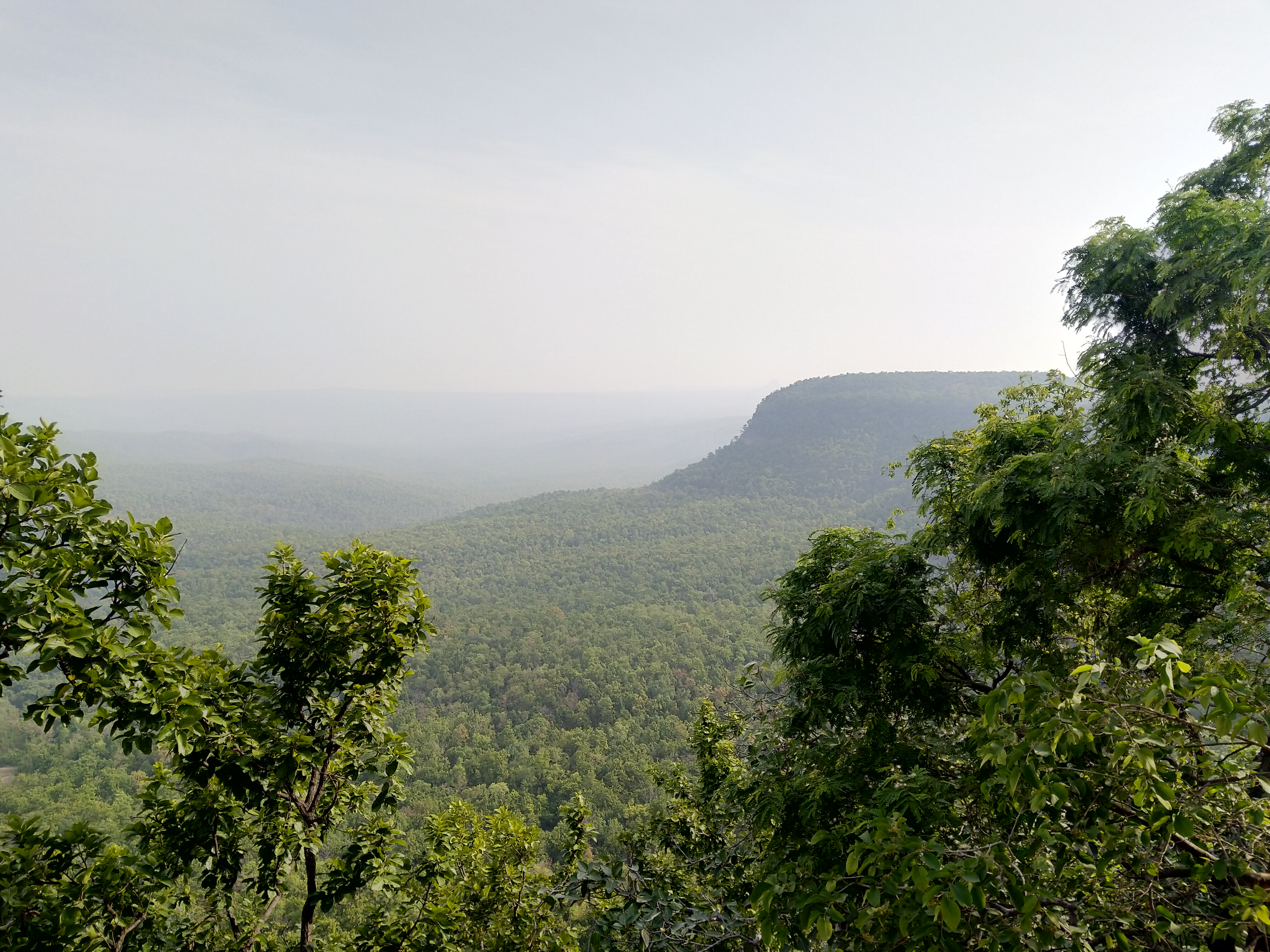
Chhattisgarh and Odisha are other major forest covered states of India.

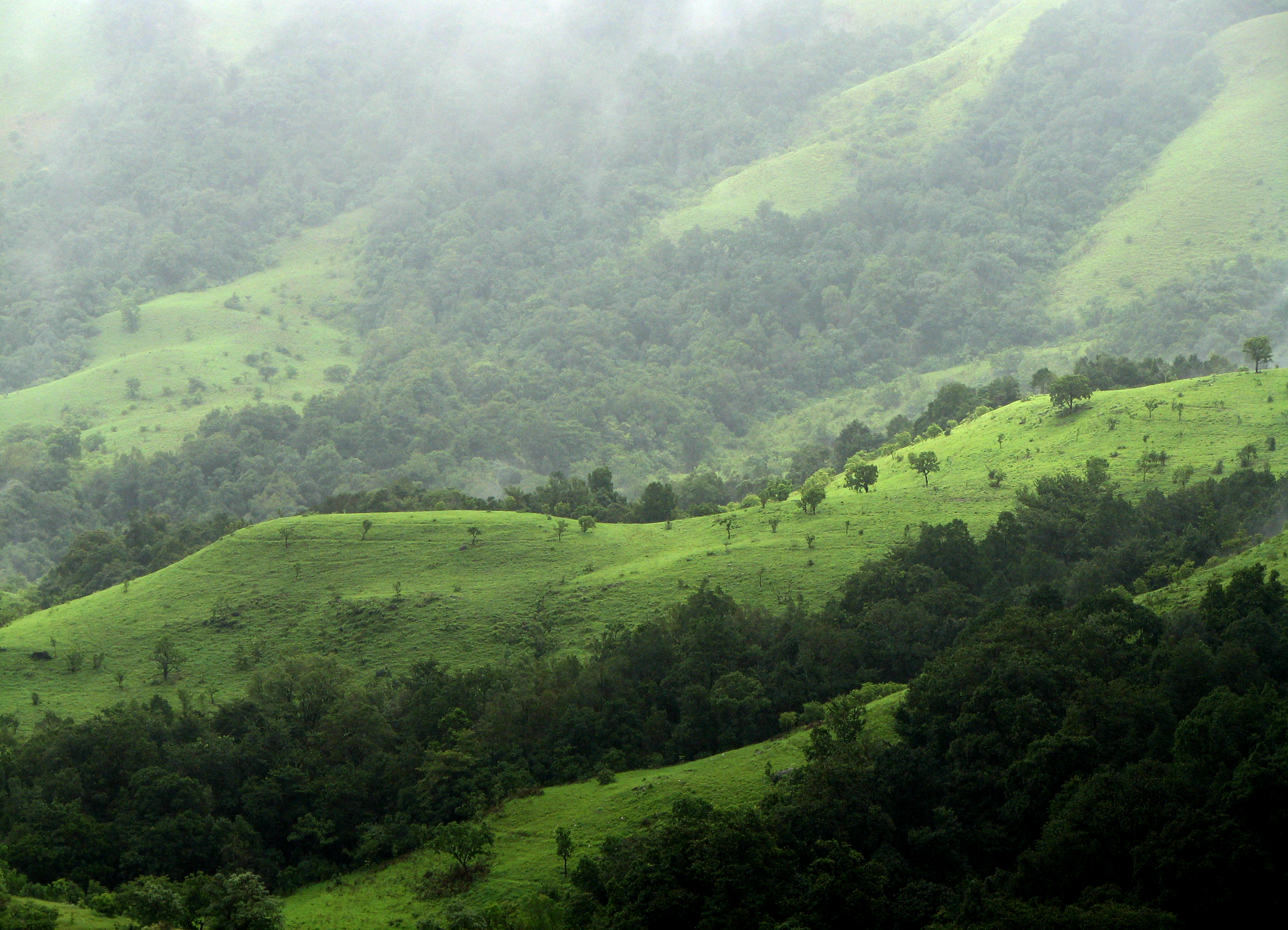
Western Ghats are another bio-active forest cover of India. Above Kudremukh National Park, Karnataka.

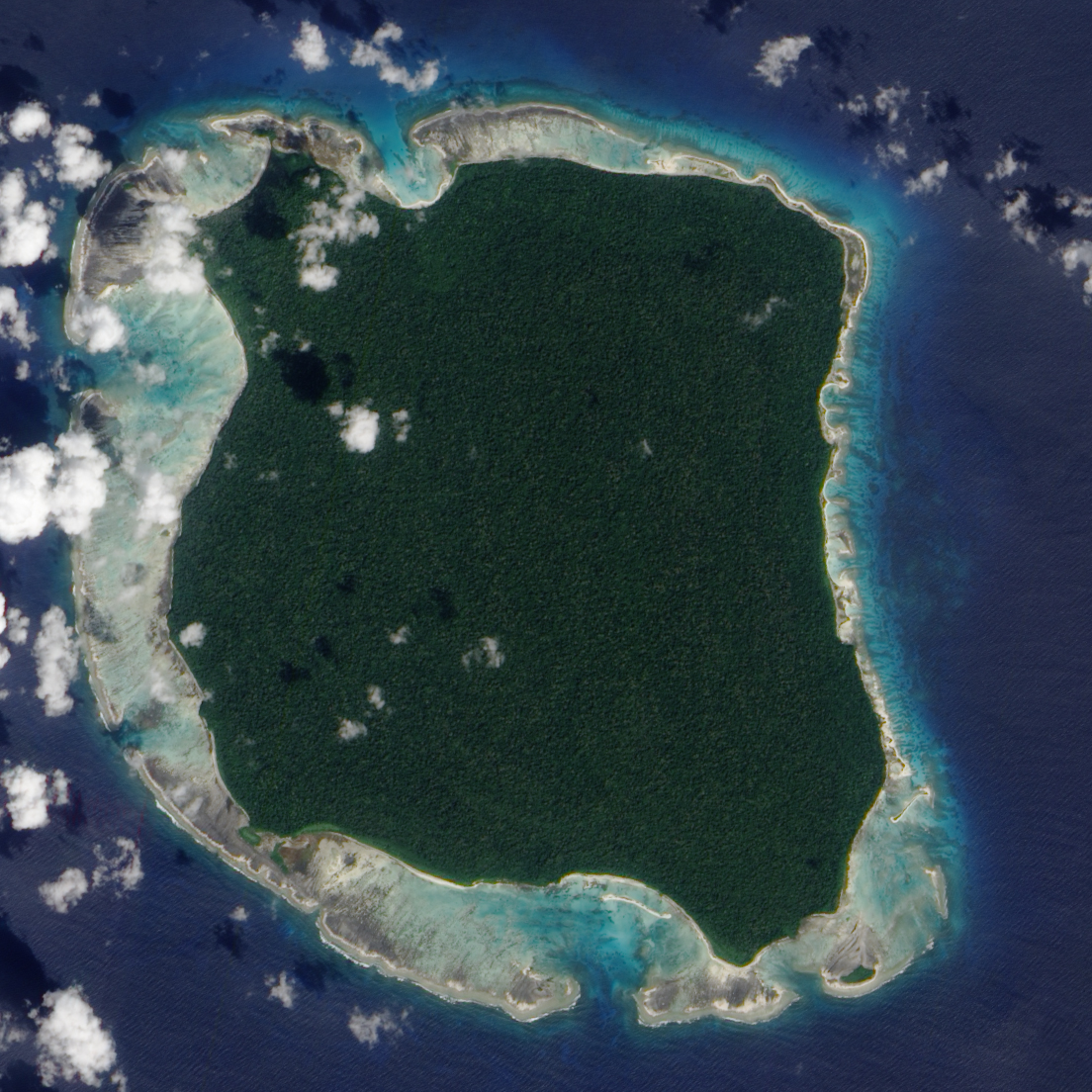
A satellite image of India's North Sentinel Island covered with forest

Forestry in India is a significant rural industry and a major environmental resource. India is one of the ten most forest-rich countries of the world. Together, India and 9 other countries account for 67 percent of the total forest area of the world. India's forest cover grew at 0.20% annually over 1990–2000, and has grown at the rate of 0.7% per year over 2000–2010, after decades where forest degradation was a matter of serious concern.

As of 2010, the Food and Agriculture Organization of the United Nations estimates India's forest cover to be about 68 million hectares, or 22% of the country's area The 2013 Forest Survey of India states its forest cover increased to 69.8 million hectares by 2012, per satellite measurements; this represents an increase of 5,871 square kilometers of forest cover in 2 years. However, the gains were primarily in northern, central and southern Indian states, while northeastern states witnessed a net loss in forest cover over 2010 to 2012. In 2018, the total forest and tree cover in India increased to 24.39% or 8,02,088 km^{2}. It increased further to 24.56 percent or 807,276 square kilometres in 2019.

Without a major effort to expand electricity generation and power plants, it is feared that the poor in India will continue to meet their energy needs through destruction of forests and wood consumption. India's dependence on fuel-wood and forestry products as a primary energy source is environmentally unsustainable and a primary cause of haze and air pollution.

In addition, India has a thriving non-wood forest products industry, which produces latex, gums, resins, essential oils, flavours, fragrances and aroma chemicals, incense sticks, handicrafts, thatching materials and medicinal plants. About 60% of non-wood forest products production is consumed locally. About 50% of the total revenue from the forestry industry in India is in non-wood forest products category.

== History of forestry in India ==
=== Forestry in ancient and medieval India ===
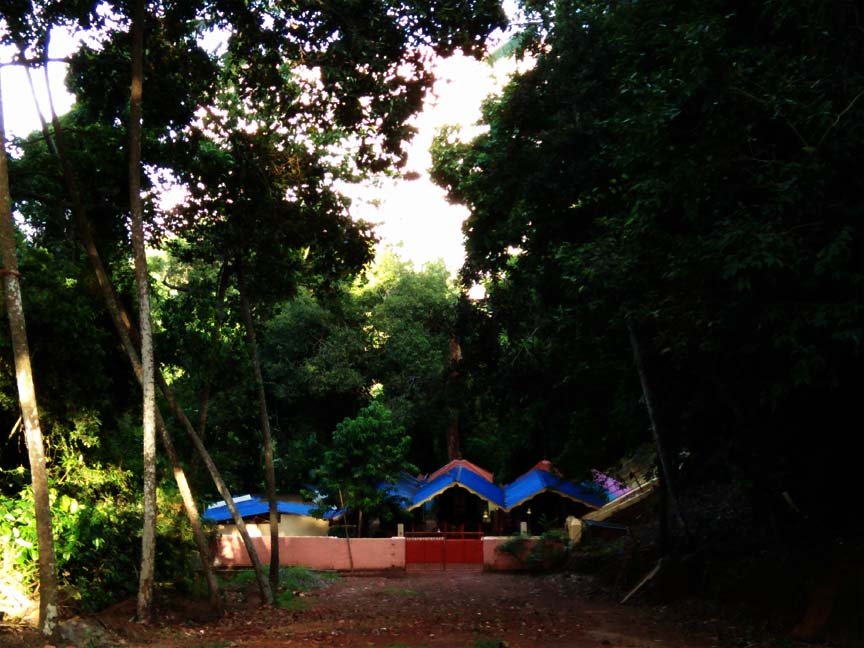
A small sacred grove inside the Technopark, Trivandrum, India

The forest (vana/araṇya) played a major role in early Indian literature, usually presented in opposition to settled society. It was represented as the setting for royal hunts, and as the home of hermits, whose hermitages are depicted as idyllic societies in harmony with the natural environment.

Yajnavalkya Smriti written before the 5th century AD prohibited the cutting of trees and if a tree is cut punishments were prescribed for such acts. The Kautalya's Arthashastra written in the Mauryan Period, says about the need of forest administration. It also says how a forest is important for a successful kingdom.

=== Forestry in Colonial system ===
In 1840, the British colonial administration promulgated an ordinance called Crown Land (Encroachment) Ordinance. This ordinance targeted forests in Britain's Asian colonies, and vested all forests, wastes, unoccupied and uncultivated lands to the crown. The Imperial Forest Department was established in India in 1864. The British state monopoly over Indian forests was first asserted through the Indian Forest Act of 1865. This law simply established the government's claims over forests. The British colonial government then passed the more comprehensive Forest Act of 1878, giving them control over all wastelands, which were defined to encompass all forests. Additionally, this Act gave the government the power to designate woods as reserved and protected.. In the former, all local rights were abolished while in the latter some existing rights were accepted as a privilege offered by the British government to the local people which can be taken away if necessary. These colonial laws brought the forests under the centralised sovereignty of the state. Sir Dietrich Brandis, the Inspector General of Forests in India from 1864 to 1883, is regarded as the father not only of scientific forestry in India, but as the "father of tropical forestry."

An FAO report claims it was believed in colonial times that the forest is a national resource which should be utilised for the interests of the government. Like coal and gold mines, it was believed that forests belonged to the state for exploitation. Forest areas became a source of revenue. For example, teak was extensively exploited by the British colonial government for ship construction, sal and pine in India for railway sleepers and so on. Forest contracts, such as that of biri pata (leaves of Diospyros melanoxylon), earned so much revenue that it was often used by the people involved in this business as a leverage for political power. These contracts also created forest zamindars (government recognised forest landowners).The government gave out these contracts without any restrictions in regard to conservation and these contractors began cutting trees indiscriminately as a result forest around train tracks disappeared. The British agenda regarding forest in India displaced the locals and natives of India who had ideas in cognizance with coexisting with the forest with industrial exploitation of forest and used it to create revenue for the British Crown. The Forest Act of 1865 amended twice in 1878 and 1927 aimed at declaring the forests of India the property of the government ergo a resource of the British Crown. These actions of the British government took away the livelihood of the local people. The British government cleared vast lands of forests for cultivation of plantations similar to those in Africa and America, wherein abundant exploitation of people was prominent. This indiscriminate exploitation of Indian Forest was done under the banner of "scientific forestry". Additionally, as in Africa, some forests in India were earmarked by the government officials and the rulers with the sole purpose of using them for hunting and sport for the royalty and the colonial officials.

=== Forestry in India from 1947 to 1990 ===
In 1952, the government nationalised the forests which were earlier with the zamindars. India also nationalised most of the forest wood industry and non-wood forest products industry. Over the years, many rules and regulations were introduced by India. In 1980, the Conservation Act was passed, which stipulated that the central permission is required to practice sustainable agro-forestry in a forest area. Violations or lack of permits was made a criminal offense. These nationalisation wave and laws intended to limit deforestation, conserve biodiversity, and save wildlife. However, the intent of these regulations was not matched by reality that followed. Neither investment aimed at sustainable forestry nor knowledge transfer followed once India had nationalised and heavily regulated forestry. Deforestation increased, biodiversity diminished and wildlife dwindled. India's rural population and impoverished families continued to ignore the laws passed in Delhi, and use the forests near them for sustenance.

India launched its National Forest Policy in 1988. This led to a programme named Joint Forest Management, which proposed that specific villages in association with the forest department will manage specific forest blocks. In particular, the protection of the forests would be the responsibility of the people. By 1992, seventeen states of India participated in Joint Forest Management, bringing about 2 million hectares of forests under protection. The effect of this initiative has been claimed to be positive. The growth rates have been slow through these years.

=== Post 1990 Forestry in India ===
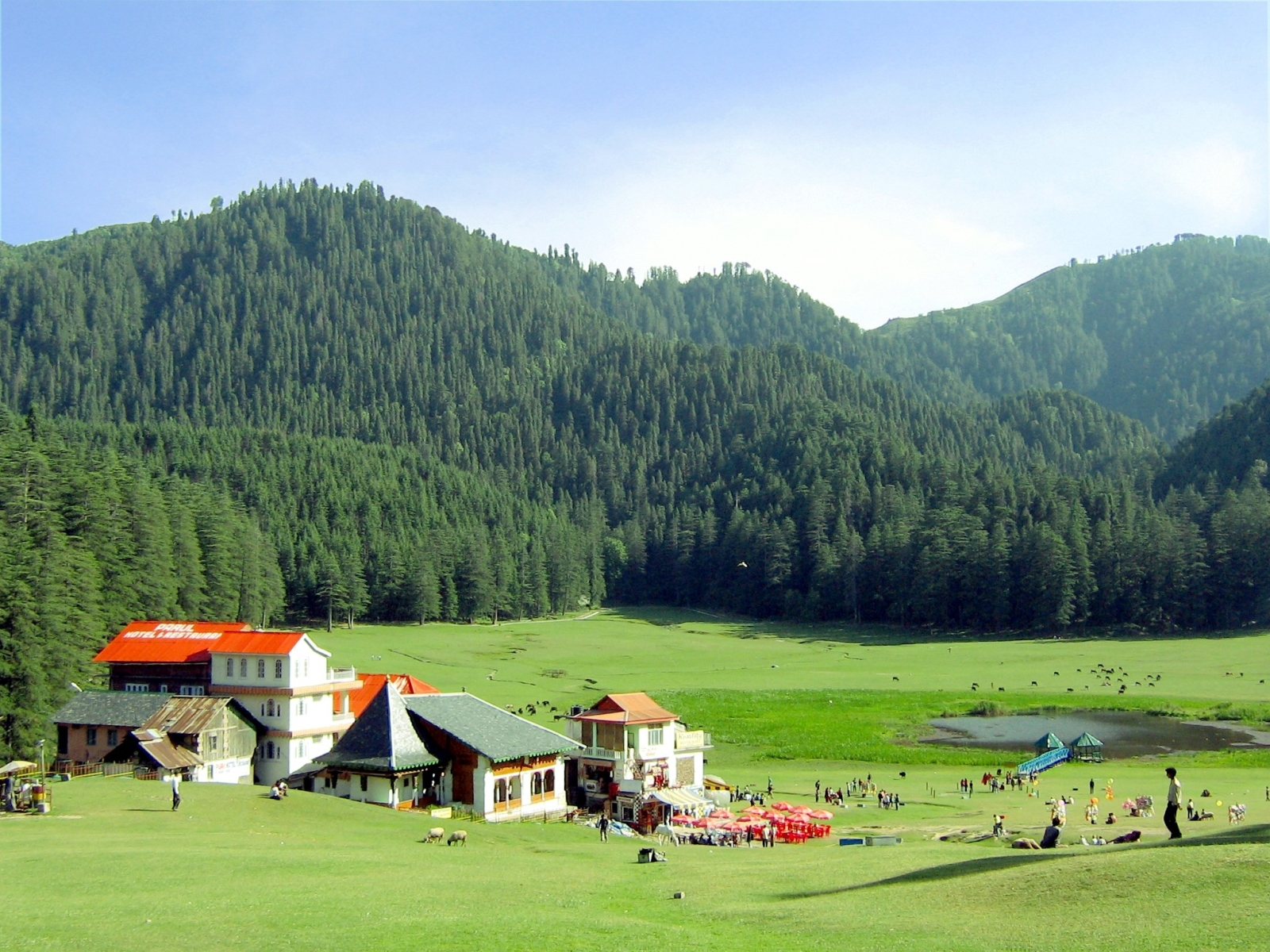
Forests in Himachal Pradesh

Since 1991, India has reversed the deforestation trend. Specialists of the United Nations report India's forest as well as woodland cover has increased. A 2010 study by the Food and Agriculture Organisation ranks India amongst the 10 countries with the largest forest area coverage in the world (the other nine being Russian Federation, Brazil, Canada, United States of America, China, Democratic Republic of the Congo, Australia, Indonesia and Sudan). India is also one of the top 10 countries with the largest primary forest coverage in the world, according to this study.

From 1990 to 2000, FAO finds India was the fifth largest gainer in forest coverage in the world; while from 2000 to 2010, FAO considers India as the third largest gainer in forest coverage.

Some 500,000 square kilometres, about 17% of India's land area, were regarded as Forest Area in the early 1990s. In FY 1987, however, actual forest cover was 640,000 square kilometres. Some claim, that because more than 50% of this land was barren or bushland, the area under productive forest was actually less than 350,000 square kilometres, or approximately 10% of the country's land area.

India's 0.6% average annual rate of deforestation for agricultural and non-lumbering land uses in the decade beginning in 1981 was one of the lowest in the world and on a par with Brazil.

== Forest types and assessment ==
India is a large and diverse country. Its land area includes regions with some of the world's highest rainfall to very dry deserts, coast line to alpine regions, river deltas to tropical islands. The variety and distribution of forest vegetation is large: there are 600 species of hardwoods, including sal (Shorea robusta). India is one of the 17 mega biodiverse regions of the world.

Indian forests types include tropical evergreens, tropical deciduous, swamps, mangroves, sub-tropical, montane, scrub, sub-alpine and alpine forests. These forests support a variety of ecosystems with diverse flora and fauna.

Type of forest	Area (in square kilometres)	Percentage of total forest
Tropical Wet Evergreen Forests	51,249	8.0
Tropical Semi Evergreen Forests	26,424	4.1
Tropical Moist Deciduous Forests	2,36,794	37.0
Littoral & Swamp Forests	4,046	0.6
Tropical Dry Deciduous Forests	1,86,620	28.6
Tropical Thorn Forests	16,491	2.6
Tropical Dry Evergreen Forests	1,404	0.2
Subtropical Broadleaved Hill Forests	2,781	0.4
Subtropical Pine Forests	42,377	6.6
Subtropical Dry evergreen Forests	12,538	2.5
Montane Wet Temperate Forests	23,365	3.6
Himalayan Moist Temperate Forests	12,012	3.4
Himalayan Dry Temperate Forests	312	0.0
Sub Alpine Forests	18,628	2.9
Total (Forest Cover + Scrub)	7,54,252	98.26
Grass land in different forest type groups (without forest cover)	13,329	1.74
Grand Total	7,67,581	100.00

=== Forest cover measurement methods ===
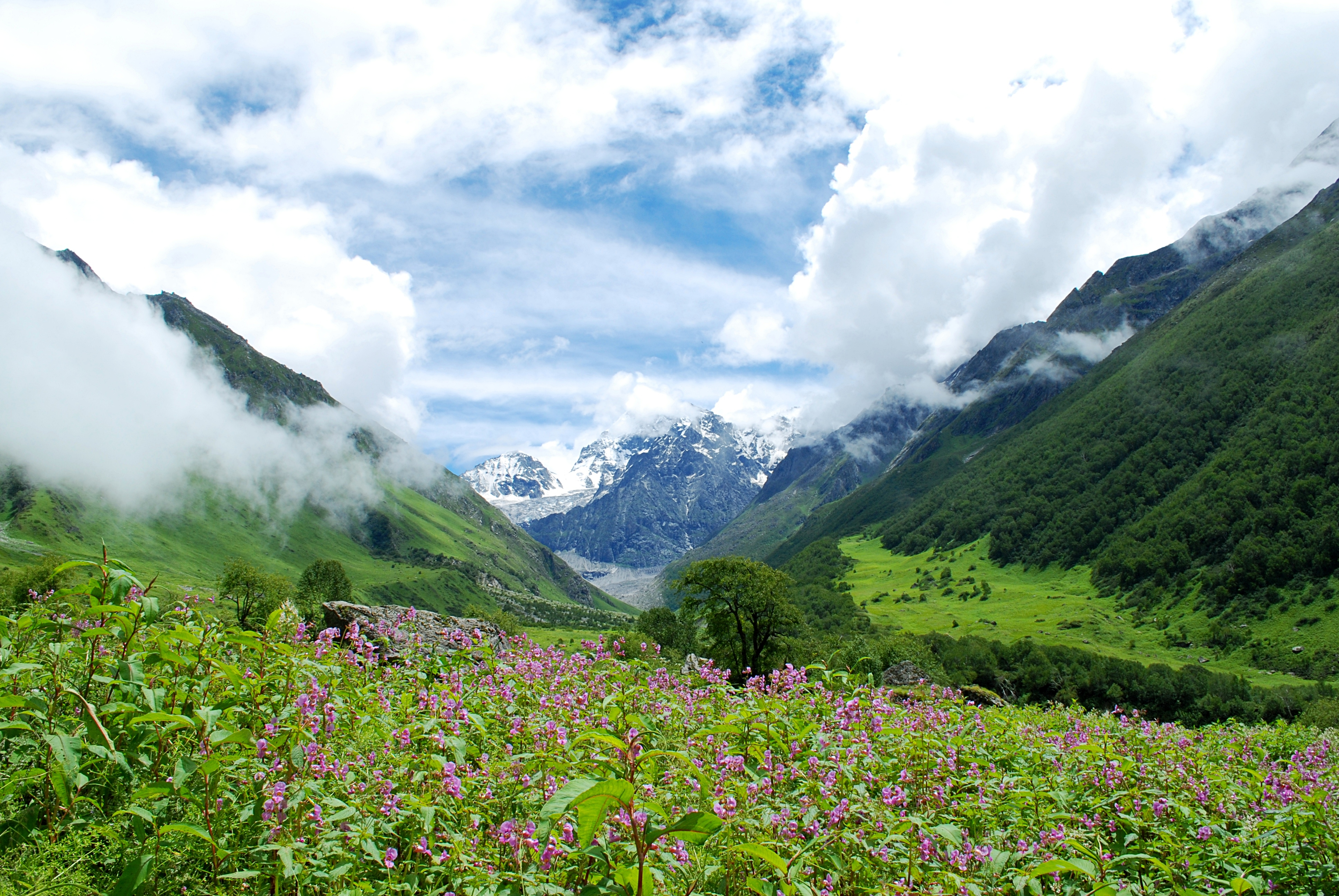
Forests in the valley of flowers, Uttarakhand

Prior to the 1980s, India deployed a bureaucratic method to estimate forest coverage. A land was notified as covered under Indian Forest Act, and then officials deemed this land area as recorded forest even if it was devoid of vegetation. By this forest-in-name-only method, the total amount of recorded forest, per official Indian records, was 71.8 million hectares. Any comparison of forest coverage number of a year before 1987 for India, to current forest coverage in India, is thus meaningless; it is just bureaucratic record keeping, with no relation to reality or meaningful comparison.

In the 1980s, space satellites were deployed for remote sensing of real forest cover. Standards were introduced to classify India's forests into the following categories:

- Forest Cover: defined as all lands, more than one hectare in area, with a tree canopy density of more than 10%. Such lands may or may not be statutorily notified as forest area which is the area recorded as a forest in the Government records. It is also referred to as "Recorded Forest Area". Forest Cover includes all cultivated tree plantations or orchards with an area of more than one hectare.
  - Very Dense Forest: All lands, with a forest cover with a canopy density of 70% and above. It covers nearly 3.04% of the country's area in 2021.
  - Moderately Dense Forest: All lands, with a forest cover with a canopy density of 40-70 %. It covers nearly 9.33% of the country's area in 2021.
  - Open Forest: All lands, with forest cover with a canopy density of 10 to 40%. It covers nearly 9.34% of the country's area in 2021.
  - Scrub Cover: All lands, generally in and around forest areas, having bushes and or poor tree growth, chiefly small or stunted trees with canopy density less than 10%.It covers nearly 1.42% of the country's area in 2021.
  - Non-Forest Land: defined as lands without any forest cover. It covers nearly 76.87% of the country's area in 2021.
- Tree Cover: Land with tree patches (blocks and linear) outside the recorded forest area exclusive of forest cover and less than the minimum mappable area of 1 hectare. It covers nearly 2.91% of the country's area in 2021 which is part of the Non-forest land.
- Mangrove Cover: Mangrove forest is a salt tolerant forest ecosystem found mainly in tropical and sub-tropical coastal and/or inter-tidal regions. Mangrove cover is the area covered under mangrove vegetation as interpreted digitally from remote sensing data. It is a part of forest cover and is also classified into three classes viz. very dense, moderately dense, and open.
- Trees Outside Forests: Trees growing outside Recorded Forest Areas

The first satellite recorded forest coverage data for India became available in 1987. India and the United States cooperated in 2001, using Landsat MSS with a spatial resolution of 80 meters, to get accurate forest distribution data. India thereafter switched to digital images and advanced satellites with 23 meters resolution and software processing of images to get more refined data on forest quantity and forest quality. India now assesses its forest distribution data biennially.

== Distribution of forest by States/Union Territories ==
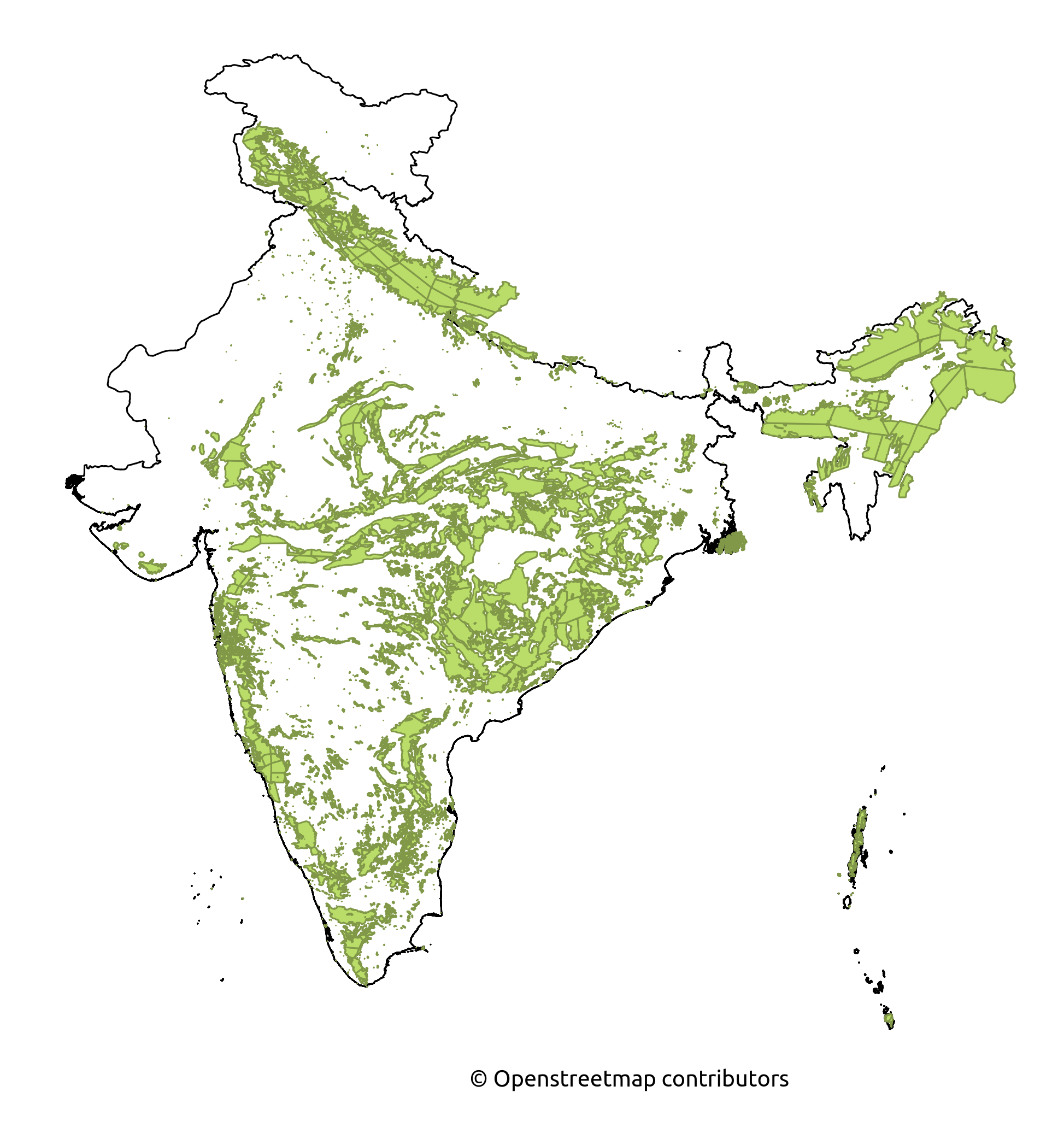
Indian forest cover map as of 2015

According to the 2019 Forest Survey, the State of Madhya Pradesh has the largest forest cover in the country. In terms of percentage of forest cover Mizoram (85.41 percent) is the most forest rich state. In Lakshadweep, around 90.33% of forest can be found. The States/Union Territories that showed larger increase in forest cover is Karnataka followed by Andhra Pradesh, Kerala, and Jammu & Kashmir while the States/Union Territories that showed loss of forest cover are Manipur, Arunachal Pradesh and Mizoram.

2015 forest survey data

The 2015 forest census data thus obtained and published by the Government of India suggests the five states with largest area under forest cover as the following:

State	Area (in square kilometres)
Madhya Pradesh	77,462
Arunachal Pradesh	67,248
Chhattisgarh	55,586
Maharashtra	50,628
Odisha	50,354

2019 forest survey data

The 2019 forest census data thus obtained and published by the Government of India suggests the five states with largest area under forest cover as the following:

Percentage of forest cover map as of 2021

State	Area (in square kilometres)
Madhya Pradesh	77,482
Arunachal Pradesh	66,688
Chhattisgarh	55,611
Odisha	51,619
Maharashtra	50,778

== Strategy to increase cover ==
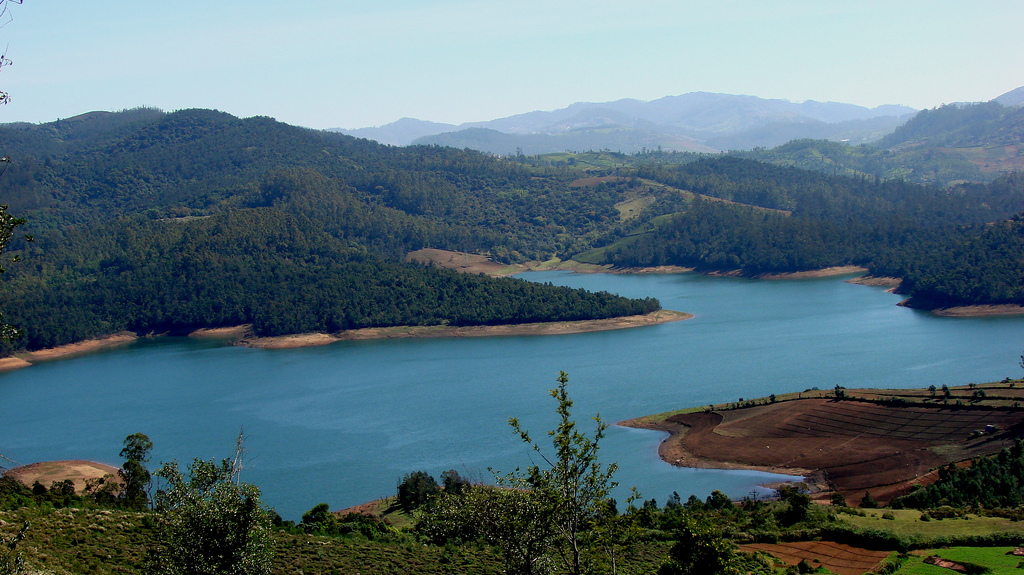
Forest around a lake in the Western Ghats of India

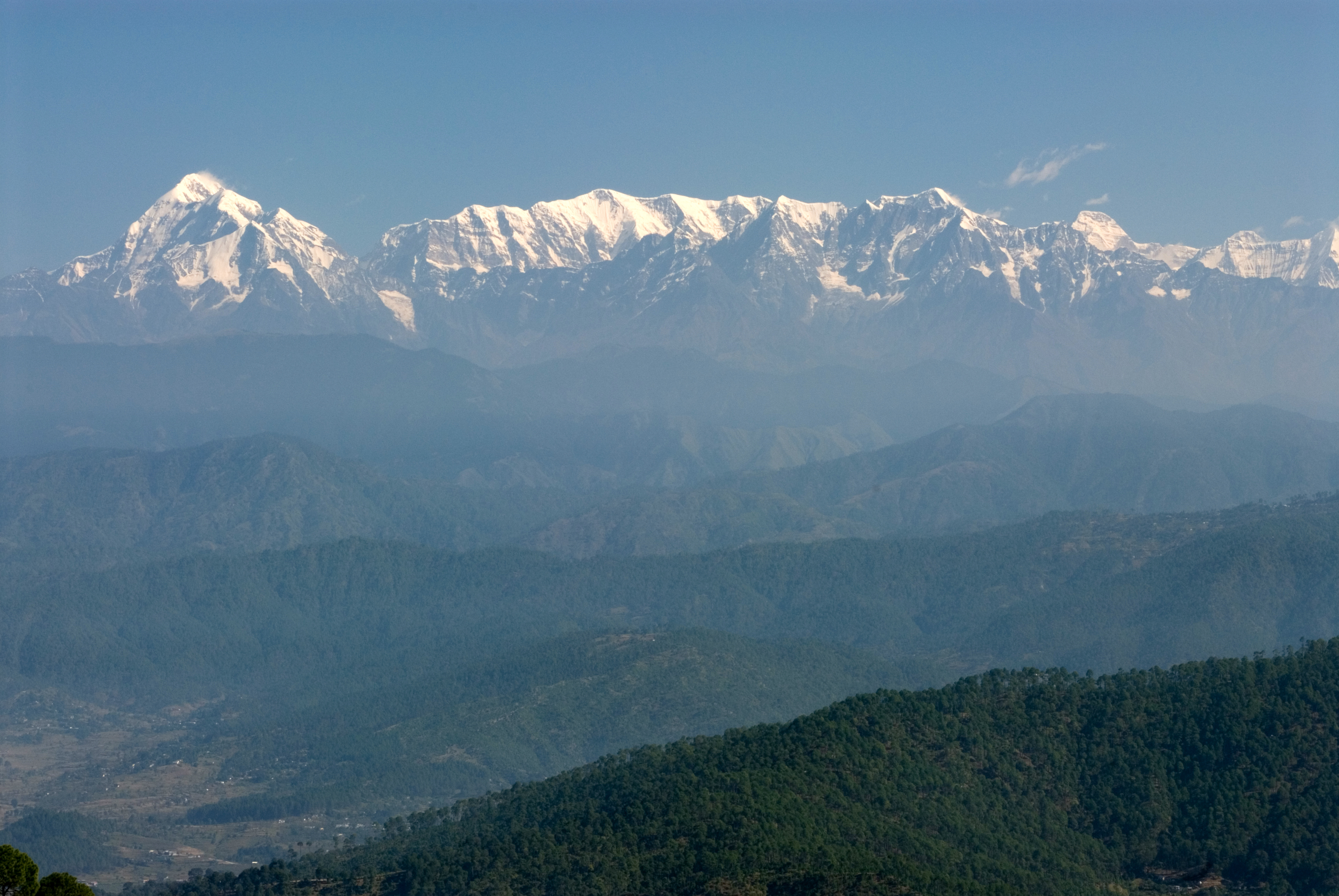
Forest covered hills in Uttarakhand

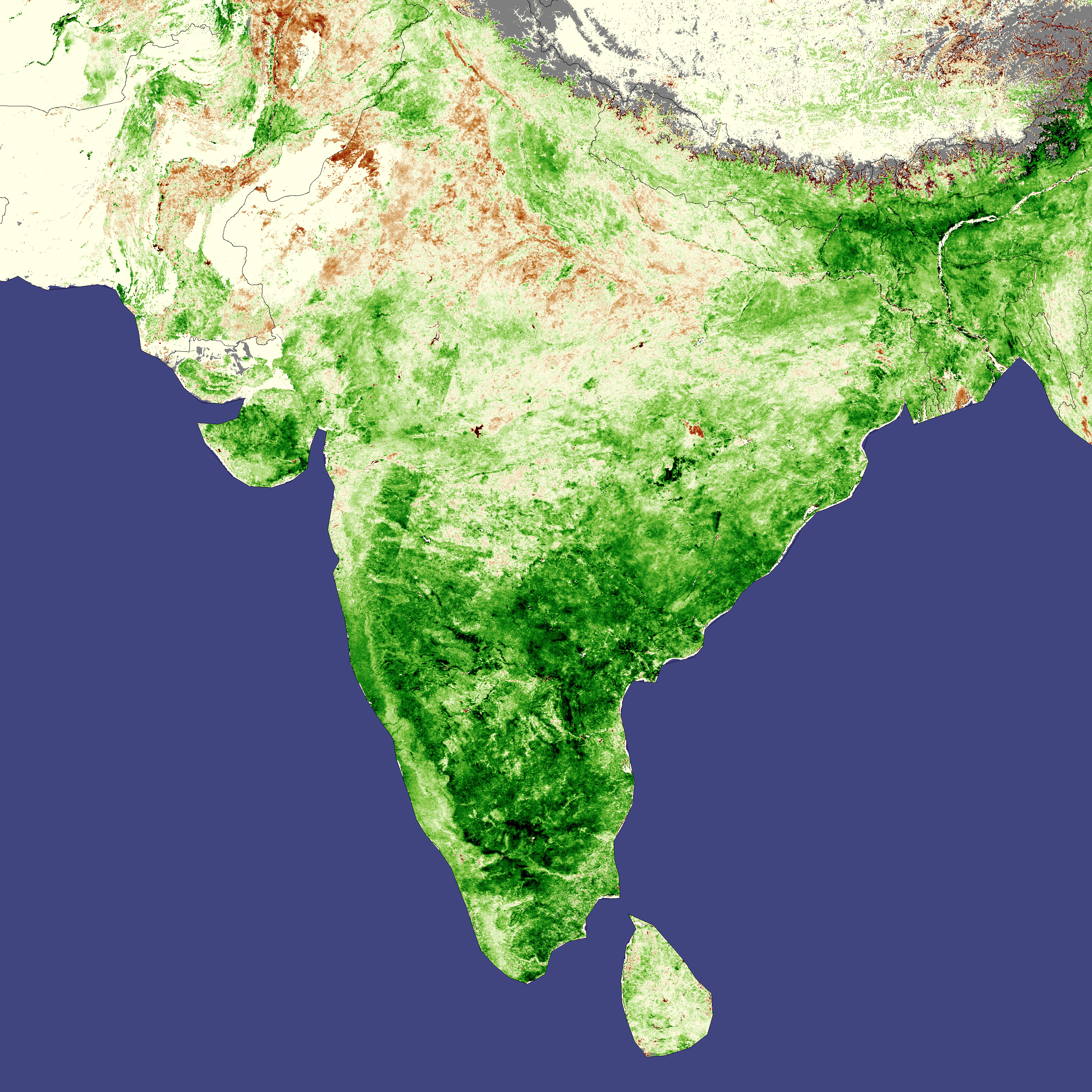
A NASA satellite image of India in April 2008, showing forest cover and about to be harvested crop in its peninsula region

In the 1970s, India declared its long-term strategy for forestry development to compose of three major objectives: to reduce soil erosion and flooding; to supply the growing needs of the domestic wood products industries; and to supply the needs of the rural population for fuelwood, fodder, small timber, and miscellaneous forest produce. To achieve these objectives, the National Commission on Agriculture in 1976 recommended the reorganisation of state forestry departments and advocated the concept of social forestry. The commission itself worked on the first two objectives, emphasising traditional forestry and wildlife activities; in pursuit of the third objective, the commission recommended the establishment of a new kind of unit to develop community forests. Following the leads of Gujarat and Uttar Pradesh, a number of other states also established community-based forestry agencies that emphasized programmes on farm forestry, timber management, extension forestry, reforestation of degraded forests, and use of forests for recreational purposes.

In the 1980s, such socially responsible forestry was encouraged by state community forestry agencies. They emphasized such projects as planting wood lots on denuded communal cattle-grazing grounds to make villages self-sufficient in fuelwood, to supply timber needed for the construction of village houses, and to provide the wood needed for the repair of farm implements. Both individual farmers and tribal communities were also encouraged to grow trees for profit. For example, in Gujarat, one of the more aggressive states in developing programmes of socioeconomic importance, the forestry department distributed 200 million tree seedlings in 1983. The fast-growing eucalyptus is the main species being planted nationwide, followed by pine and poplar.

In 2002, India set up a National Forest Commission to review and assess India's policy and law, its effect on India's forests, its impact of local forest communities, and to make recommendations to achieve sustainable forest and ecological security in India. The report made over 300 recommendations including the following:

- India must pursue rural development and animal husbandry policies to address local communities need to find affordable cattle fodder and grazing. To avoid destruction of local forest cover, fodder must reach these communities on reliable roads and other infrastructure, in all seasons year round.
- The Forest Rights Bill is likely to be harmful to forest conservation and ecological security. The Forest Rights Bill became a law since 2007.
- The government should work closely with mining companies. Revenue generated from lease of mines must be pooled into a dedicated fund to conserve and improve the quality of forests in the region where the mines are located.
- Power to declare ecologically sensitive areas must be with each Indian state.
- The mandate of State Forest Corporations and government owned monopolies must be changed.
- Government should reform regulations and laws that ban felling of trees and transit of wood within India. Sustainable agro-forestry and farm forestry must be encouraged through financial and regulatory reforms, particularly on privately owned lands.

India's national forest policy expects to invest INR 2,000,644,350,000 (US$26.7 billion) by 2020, to pursue nationwide afforestation coupled with forest conservation, with the goal of increasing India's forest cover from 20% to 33%.

=== Effects of tribal population growth on forest flora and fauna ===
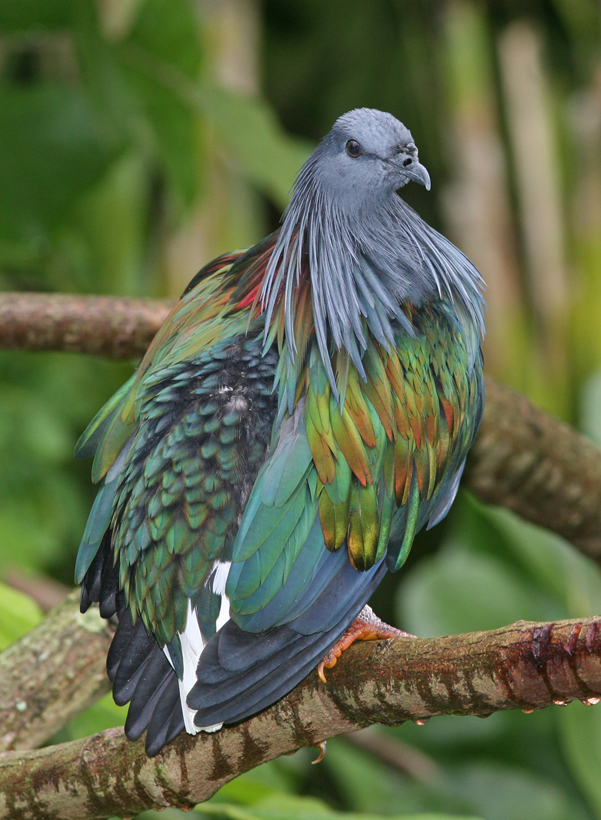
Indian forests are home to many near threatened and threatened species of birds and other wildlife. This is Nicobar pigeon found in the Andaman & Nicobar islands of India.

Due to faster tribal population growth in forest / tribal areas, naturally available forest resources (NTFP) in a sustainable manner are becoming inadequate for their basic livelihood. Many tribal peoples are giving up their traditional livelihood and taking up farming and cattle rearing in the forest areas.

== Economics ==
Significant forest products of India include paper, plywood, sandalwood, timber, poles, pulp and matchwood, fuelwood, sal seeds, tendu leaves, gums and resins, cane and rattan, bamboo, grass and fodder, drugs, spices and condiments, herbs, cosmetics, tannins.

India is a significant importer of forest products. Logs account for 67% of all wood and wood products imported into India due to local preference for unprocessed wood. This preference is explained by the availability of inexpensive labour and the large number of productive sawmills. In trade year 2008–2009, India imported logs worth $1.14 billion, an increase of about 70% in just 4 years.

Indian market for unprocessed wood is mostly fulfilled with imports from Malaysia, Myanmar, Côte d'Ivoire, China and New Zealand.

India is growing market for partially finished and ready-to-assemble furniture. China and Malaysia account for 60% of this imported furniture market in India followed by Italy, Germany, Singapore, Sri Lanka, the United States, Hong Kong, and Taiwan.

The Indian market is accustomed to teak and other hardwoods that are perceived to be more resistant to termites, decay and are able to withstand the tropical climate. Teak wood is typically seen as a benchmark with respect to grade and prices of other wood species. Major imported wood species are tropical woods such as mahogany, garjan, meranti, and sapeli. Plantation timber includes teak, eucalyptus, and poplar, as well as spruce, pine, and fir. India imports small quantities of temperate hardwoods such as ash, maple, cherry, oak, walnut, beech, etc. as squared logs or as lumber. India is the world's third largest hardwood log importer.

In 2009, India imported 332 million cubic metres of roundwood mostly for fuel wood application, 17.3 million cubic metres of sawnwood and wood-based panels, 7.6 million metric tonnes of paper and paperboard and about 4.5 million metric tonnes of wood and fiber pulp.

== Biodiversity in Indian forests ==
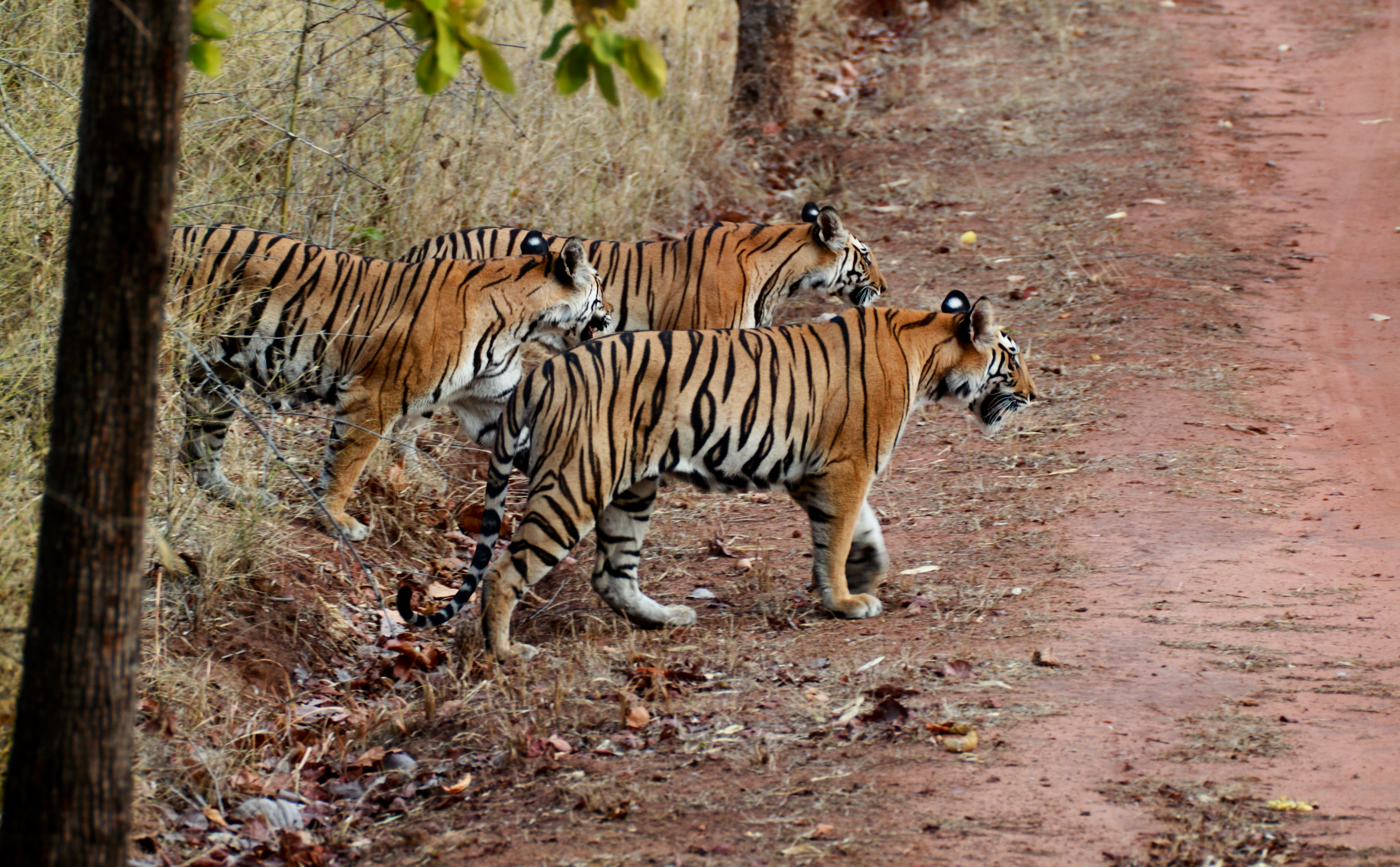
India has the majority of the world's wild tigers, approximately 3,000 in 2019.

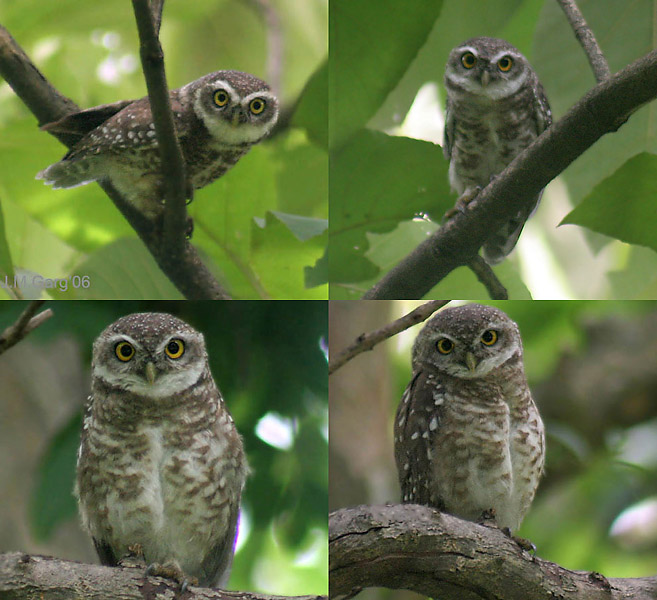
Spotted Owlet – one of over 1000 bird species in Indian forests

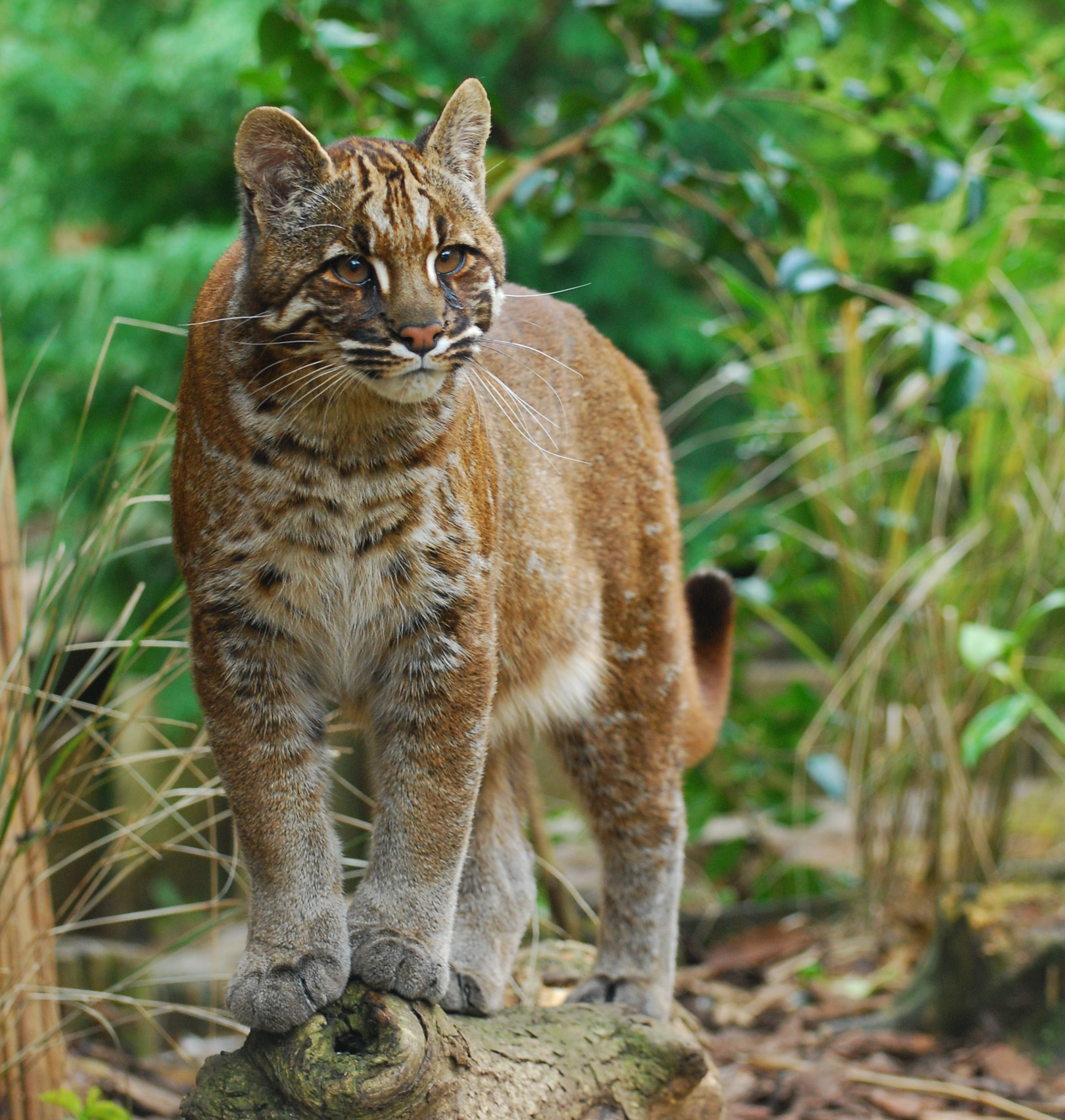
Asian Golden cat, one of the 15 feline species found in India

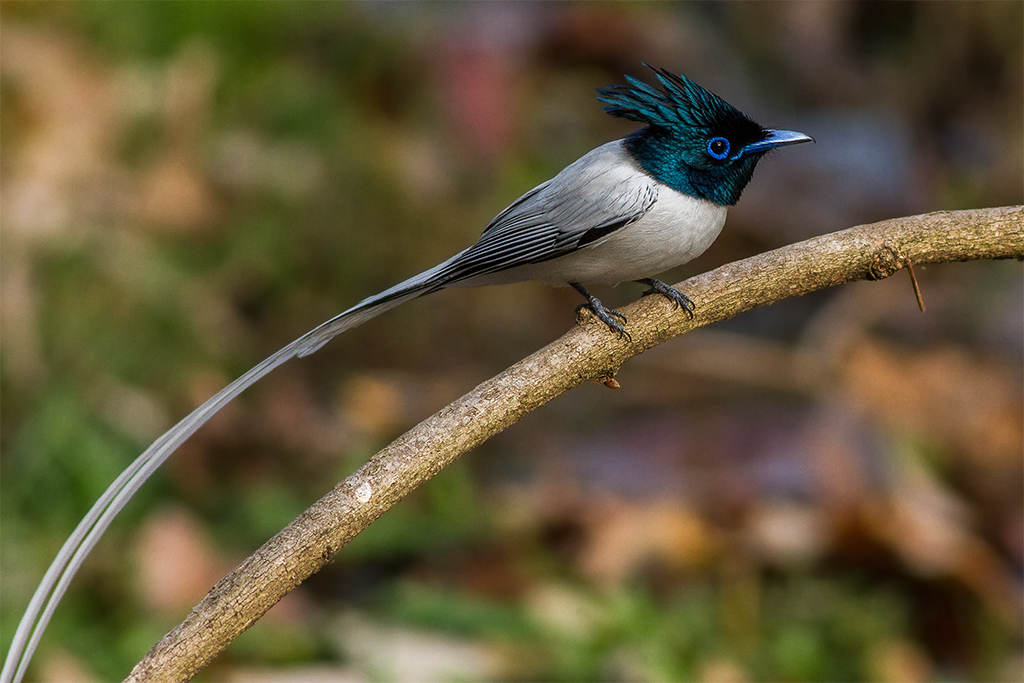
Asian paradise flycatcher – a bird found in the forests of Himachal Pradesh and Uttarakhand

Indian forests represent one of the 12 mega biodiverse regions of the world. India's Western Ghats and Eastern Himalayas are amongst the 32 biodiversity hotspots on earth.

India is home to 12% of world's recorded flora, some 47000 species of flowering and non-flowering plants. Over 59000 species of insects, 2500 species of fishes, 17000 species of angiosperms live in Indian forests. About 90000 animal species, representing over 7% of earth's recorded faunal species have been found in Indian forests. Over 4000 mammal species are found here. India has one of the richest variety of bird species on earth, hosting about 12.5% of known species of birds. Many of these flora and fauna species are endemic to India.

Indian forests and wetlands serve as temporary home to many migrant birds.

=== Trading of exotic birds ===
India was, until 1991, one of the largest exporters of wild birds to international bird markets. Most of the birds traded were parakeets and munias. Most of these birds were exported to countries in Europe and the Middle east.

In 1991, India passed a law that banned all trade and trapping of indigenous birds in the country. The passage of the law stopped the legal exports, but illegal trafficking has continued. In 2001, for example, an attempt to smuggle some 10,000 wild birds was discovered, and these birds were confiscated at the Mumbai international airport.

According to a WWF-India published report, trapping and trading of some 300 species of birds continues in India, representing 25% of known species in the country. Tens of thousands of birds are trapped from the forests of India, and traded every month to serve the demand for bird pets. Another market driver for bird trapping and trade is the segment of Indians who on certain religious occasions, buy birds in captivity and free them as an act of kindness to all living beings of the world. Trappers and traders know of the need for piety in these people, and ensure a reliable supply of wild birds so that they can satisfy their urge to do good.

The trappers, a detailed survey and investigation reveals are primarily tribal communities. The trappers lead a life of poverty and migrate over time. Their primary motivation was economics and the need to financially support their families.

Trapping and transport of trapped birds from India's forests has high injury and losses, as in other parts of the world. For every bird that reaches the market for a sale, many more die.

Abrar Ahmed, the WWF-India and TRAFFIC-India ornithologist, suggests the following as potentially effective means of stopping the harm caused by illegal trading of wild birds in India:

- Engage the tribal communities in a constructive way. Instead of criminalising their skills at finding, recognising, attracting and capturing birds, India should offer them employment to re-apply their skills through scientific management, protection and wildlife preservation.
- Allow captive and humane breeding of certain species of birds, to satisfy the market demand for pet birds.
- Better and continuous enforcement to prevent trapping practices, stop trading and end smuggling of wild birds of India through neighboring countries that have not banned trading of wild birds.
- Education and continued media exposure of the ecological and environmental harm done by wild bird trade, in order to reduce the demand for trapped wild birds as pets.

== Conservation ==
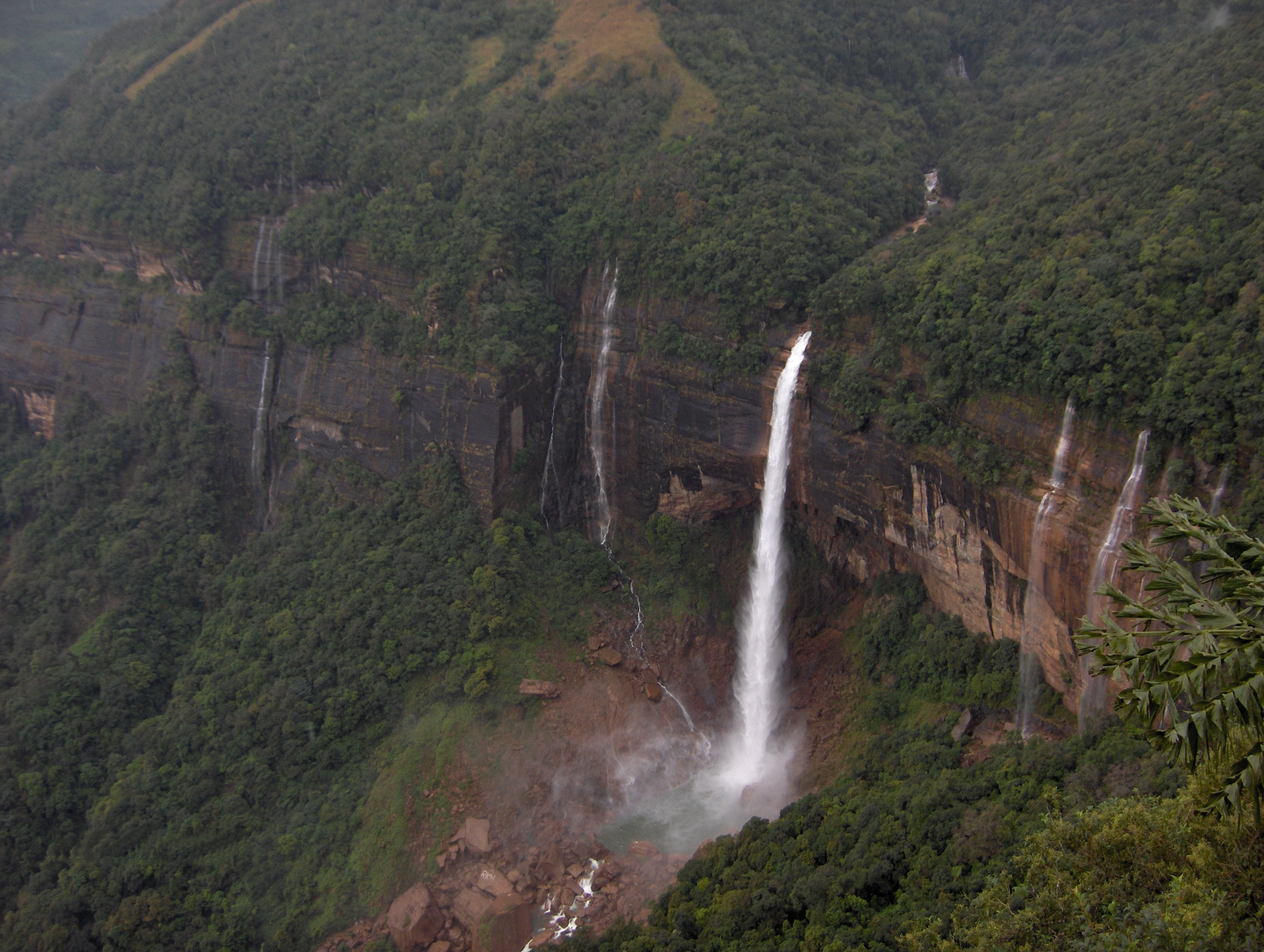
Forest around Nohkalikai fall in Meghalaya, an eastern state of India

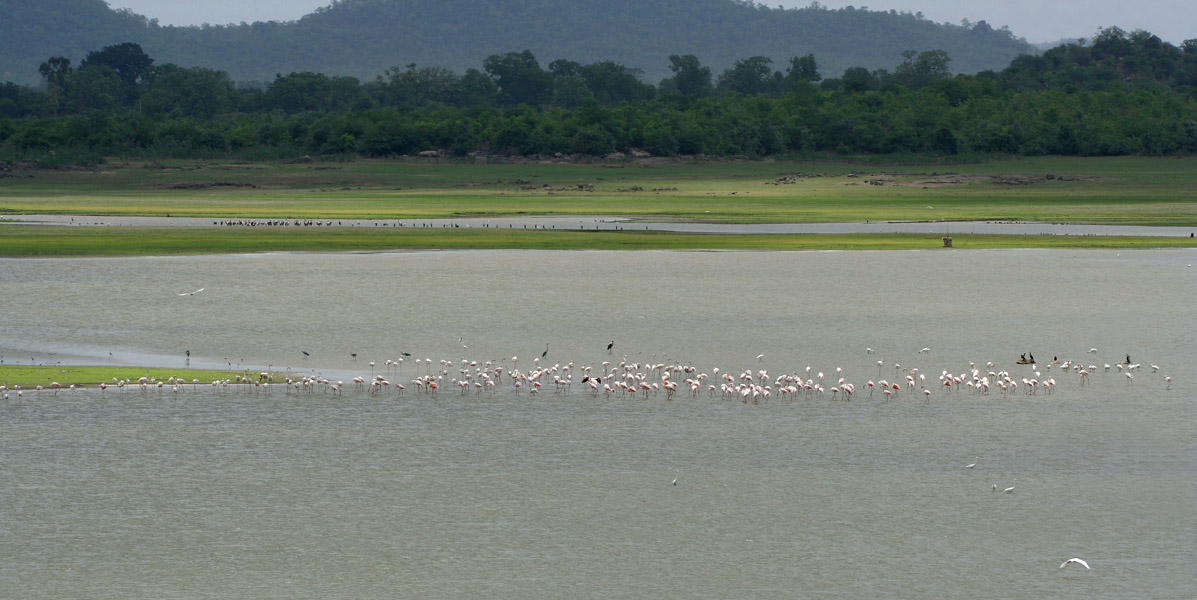
Greater Flamingoes amid forests of Andhra Pradesh

The role of forests in the national economy and in ecology was further emphasized in the 1988 National Forest Policy, which focused on ensuring environmental stability, restoring the ecological balance, and preserving the remaining forests. Other objectives of the policy were meeting the need for fuelwood, fodder, and small timber for rural and tribal people while recognizing the need to actively involve local people in the management of forest resources. Also in 1988, the Forest Conservation Act, 1980 was amended to facilitate stricter conservation measures. A new target was to increase the forest cover to 33% of India's land area from the then-official estimate of 23%. In June 1990, the central government adopted resolutions that combined forest science with social forestry, that is, taking the sociocultural traditions of the local people into. As a part of which nearly 179,000 square kilometres area was afforested during the 1951-91 period. However, despite large-scale tree planting programmes, forestry in India has actually regressed since independence. Annual fellings at about four times the growth rate are a major cause. Widespread pilfering by villagers for firewood and fodder also represents a major decrement. In addition, the 1988 National Forest Policy noted, the forested area has been shrinking as a result of land cleared for farming and development programmes.

Between 1990 and 2010, India has reversed the deforestation trend. In 2010, FAO reported that India is the third fastest in the world in increasing forest cover. According to a NASA study in 2019, India along with China was leading in increasing the Earth's greenery over the past two decades.

In 2019, 220 million trees were planted in a single day in Uttar Pradesh as a part of afforestation drive of Chief Minister Yogi Adityanath. In 2019, Prime minister Narendra Modi released Rs 47,436 Crore for Afforestation to State government.

The 2009 Indian national forest policy document emphasizes the need to combine India's effort at forest conservation with sustainable forest management. India defines forest management as one where the economic needs of local communities are not ignored, rather forests are sustained while meeting nation's economic needs and local issues through scientific forestry.

4.95% of the area of India (156,700 km^{2}) called Protected areas of India is reserved for the in situ conservation of species and their natural habitat.

== Issues and threats ==
=== Chipko movement ===
The Chipko movement in India started in the 1970s around a dispute on how and who should have a right to harvest forest resources. Although the Chipko movement is now practically non-existent in Uttarakhand, the Indian state of its origin, it remains one of the most frequently deployed examples of an environmental and people's movement in a developing country. The motivation of the movement is a subject of some debate; some neopopulists view Chipko primarily as an environmental movement and an attempt to save forests, while others suggest that the movement had nothing to do with eco-conservation, but was driven primarily by local communities' demand for equal rights to harvest forests.

According to one set of writers: Since the early 1970s, as they realised that deforestation threatened not only the ecology but their livelihood in a variety of ways, people have become more interested and involved in conservation. The best known popular activist movement is the Chipko Movement, in which local women under the leadership of Chandi Prasad Bhatt and Sunderlal Bahuguna, decided to fight the government and the vested interests to save trees. The residents declared that they would embrace—literally "to stick to" (chipkna in Hindi)--trees to prevent cutting of ash trees in their district.

According to those who critique the ecological awareness and similar theories, Chipko had nothing to do with protecting forests, rather it was an economic struggle using the traditional Indian way of non-violence. These scientists point out that very little is left of the Chipko movements today in its region of origin save for its memory, even though the quality of forests and its use remains a critical issue for India. To explain the cause of Chipko movement, they find that government officials had ignored the subsistence issues of the local communities, who depended on forests for fuel, fodder, fertiliser and sustenance resources. These researchers claim that local interviews and fact finding confirms that local communities had filed complaints requesting the right to commercially exploit the forests around them. Their requests were denied, while permits to fell trees and exploit those same forests were granted to government-favoured non-resident contractors including a sporting company named Symonds. A protest that became Chipko movement followed. The movement grew and Indian government responded by imposing a 15-year ban on felling all trees above 1000 metres in the region directly as a result of the Chipko agitations. This legislation was deeply resented by many communities supporting Chipko because, the regulation further excluded the local people from the forest around them. Opposition to the legislation resulted in so-called 'Ped Katao Andolan' in the same region, a movement to cut the trees down in order to defy the new legislation. The people behind Chipko movement felt that the government did not understand or care about their economic situation.

Chipko movement, at the very least, suggests that forests in India are an important and integral resource for communities that live within these forests, or survive near the fringes of these forests.

=== Shifting cultivation ===
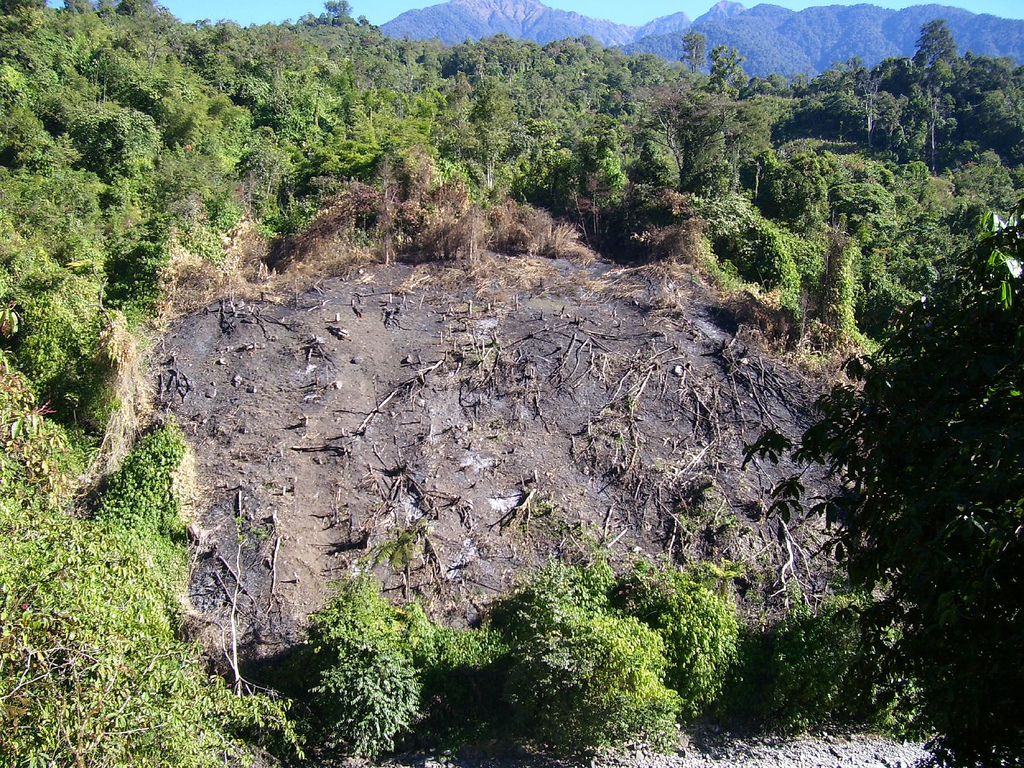
An example of Jhum cultivation, or slash and burn type farming, from India's northeast

A major threat to forests of India are in its northeastern states. From ancient times, the locals have practiced slash-and-burn shifting cultivation to grow food. Locally called Jhum, it supports about 450,000 families in Arunachal Pradesh, Nagaland, Manipur, Mizoram, Tripura, Assam and Meghalaya. Approximately 15,000 square kilometers of forest land is under jhum cultivation, and just a sixth of this land is actually producing any crop at any given year. The tribal people consider it a tradition, and economic ecosystem. However, the slash and burn causes damage to a dense forest, to soil, to flora and fauna, as well as pollution. The crop yields are very poor with jhum cultivation. Between 2010 and 2012, satellite studies confirmed a net loss of forest cover over these northeastern states. The lost forest includes primary dense forests. There is a concerted effort by the state government officials to educate, incentivize and train jhum dependent families to horticulture and other high value crops, along with an offer of food supply security. Bamboo-based textiles and value added forest products industries are also being encouraged by the local officials. States such as Arunachal Pradesh reported reduction in Jhum cultivation practice in 2013.

=== Timber mafia and forest cover ===
A 1999 publication claimed that protected forest areas in several parts of India, such as Jammu and Kashmir, Himachal Pradesh, Karnataka and Jharkhand, were vulnerable to illegal logging by timber mafias that have coopted or intimidated forestry officials, local politicians, businesses and citizenry.

Despite these local criminal and corruption issues, satellite data analysis and a 2010 FAO report finds India has added over 4 million hectares of forest cover, a 7% increase, between 1990 and 2010.

== Forest rights ==
In 1969, forestry in India underwent a major change with the passage of the Forest Rights Act, a new legislation that sought to address the needs of forest dwelling communities that resulted from the failure to record their rights over forest land and resources. It also sought to bring in new forms of community conservation.

Forest laws in India

- Indian Forest Act, 1927
- Forest Conservation Act, 1980
- Environment Protection Act, 1986
- Biological Diversity Act, 2002
- The Scheduled Tribes and Other Traditional Forest Dwellers (Recognition of Forest Rights) Act, 2006
- Compensatory Afforestation Fund Act, 2016

== Gallery ==
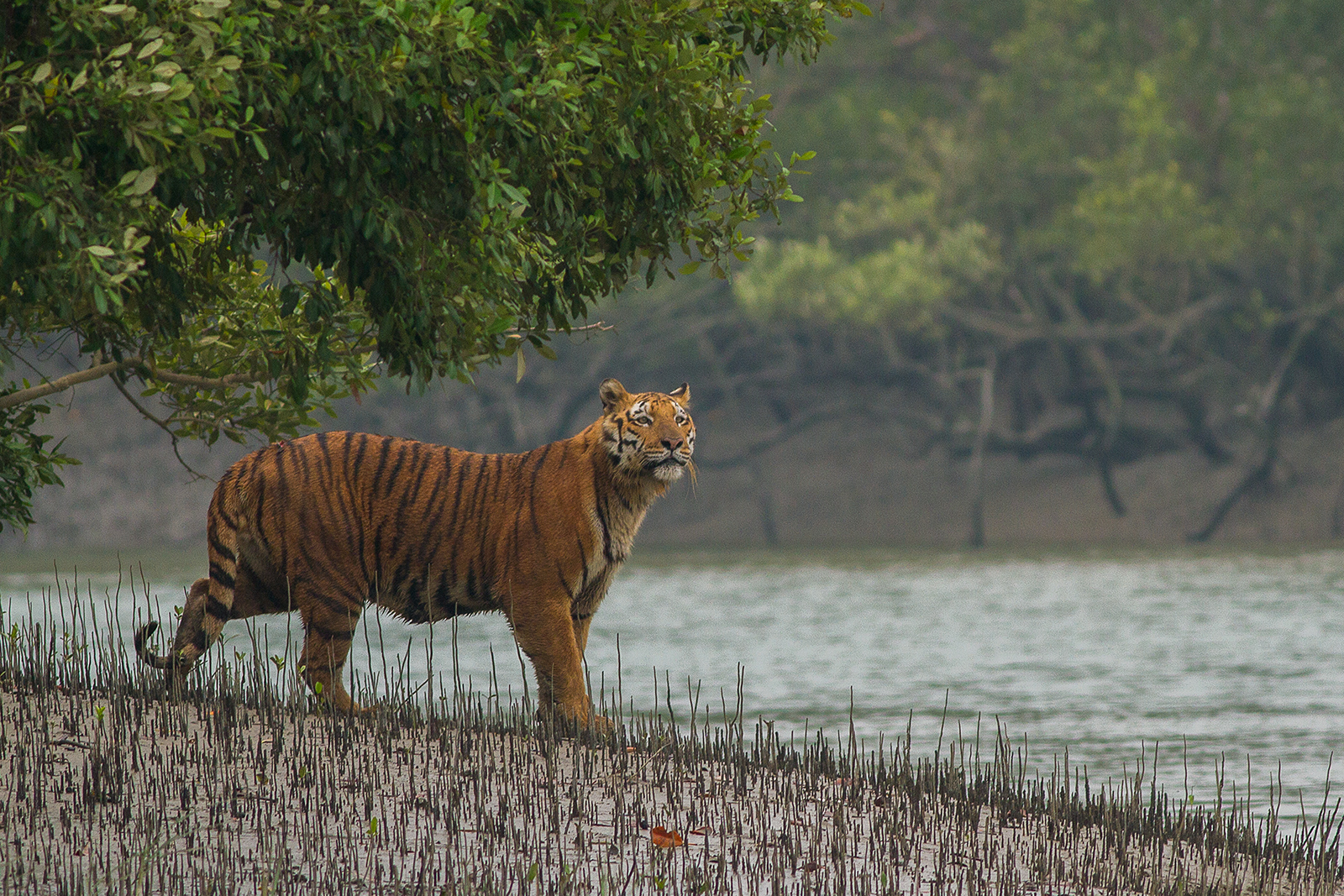
A tiger in the
Sundarban Tiger Reserve, Sundarbans National Park

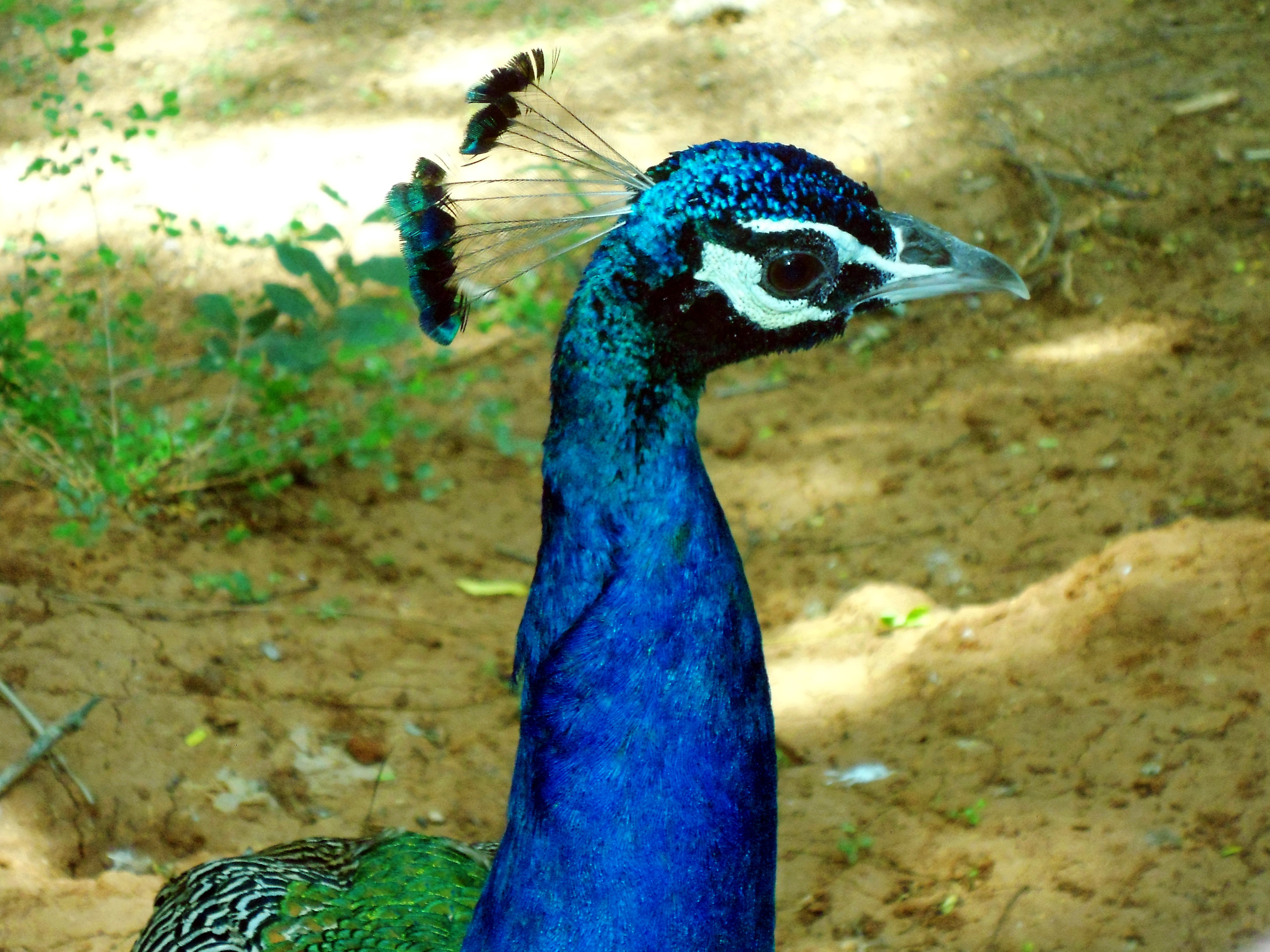
Indian peafowl spotted at Kambalakonda Wildlife Sanctuary in Visakhapatnam

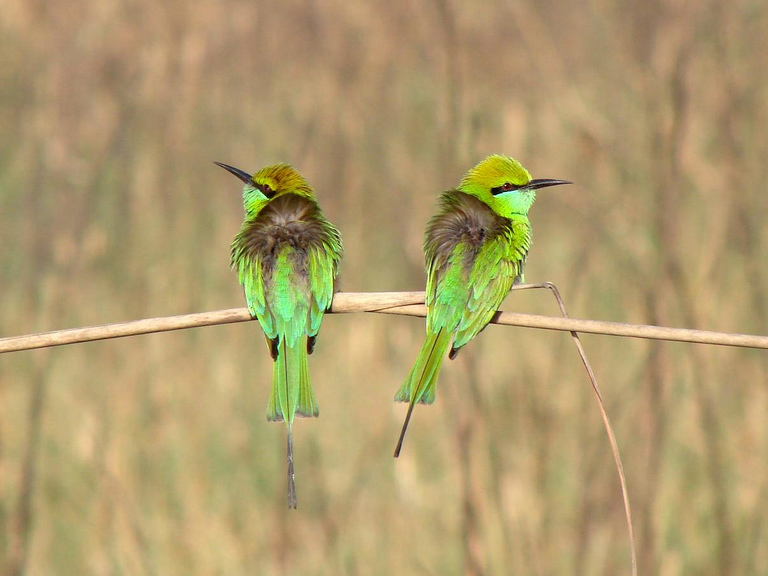
Green Bee-eaters, found in Himalayan forests of India

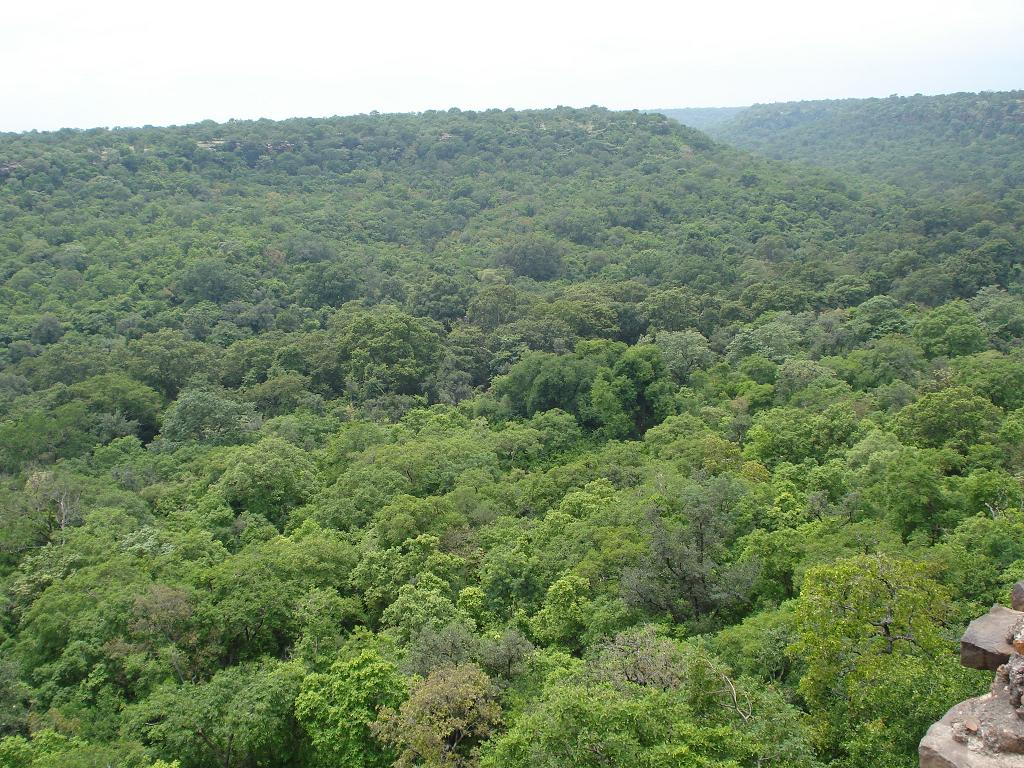
Hinglajgarh Forest in Madhya Pradesh

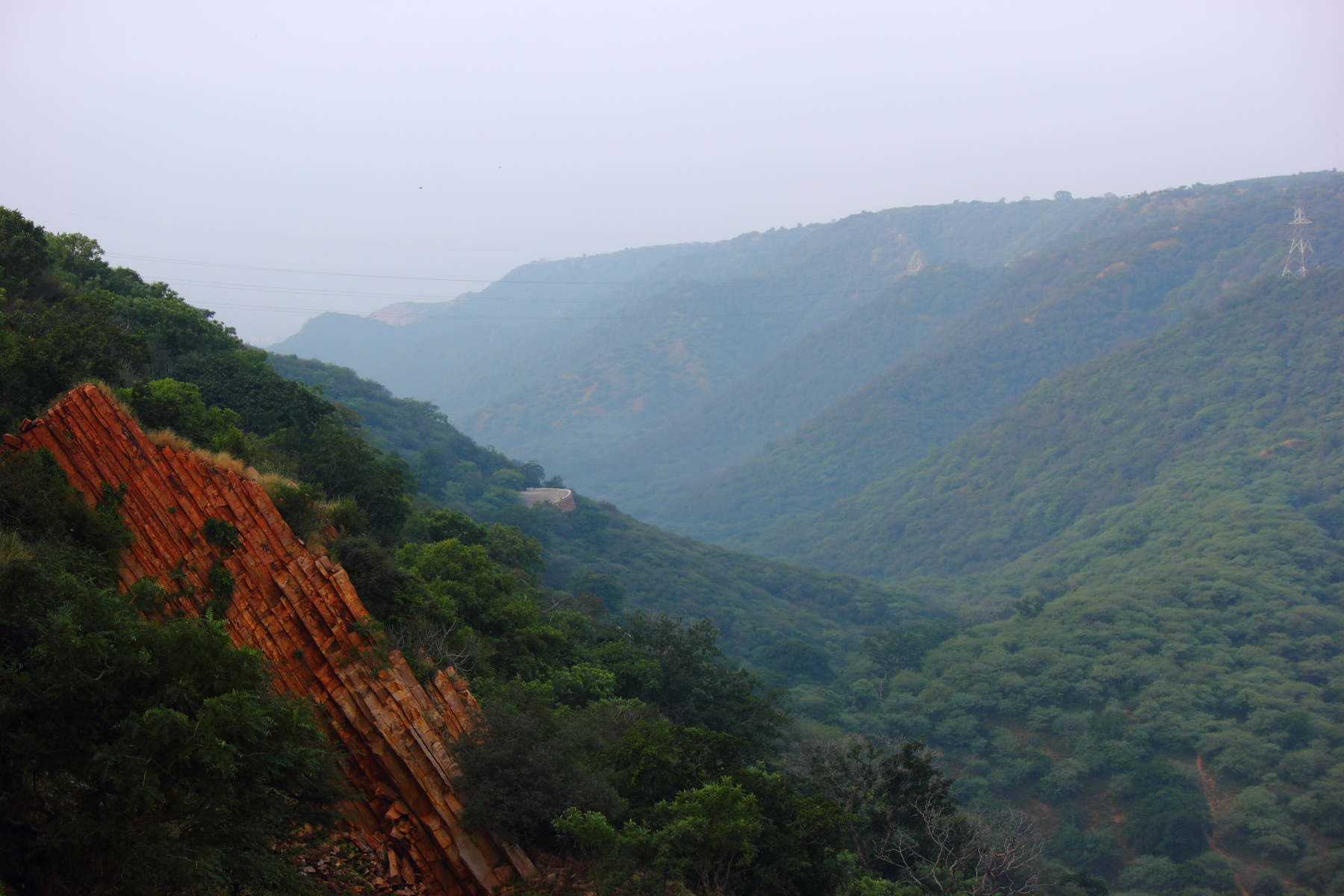
Forest cover of Aravalli range in Rajasthan

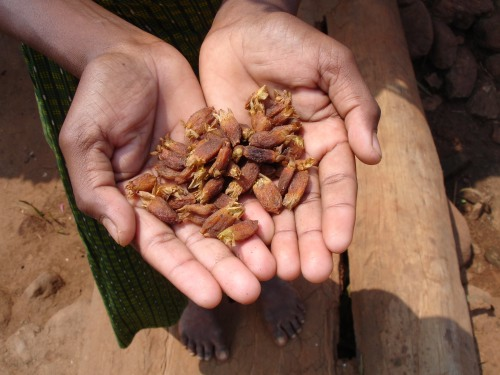
Dried Mahua flowers, an edible forest product, are a rich source of energy.

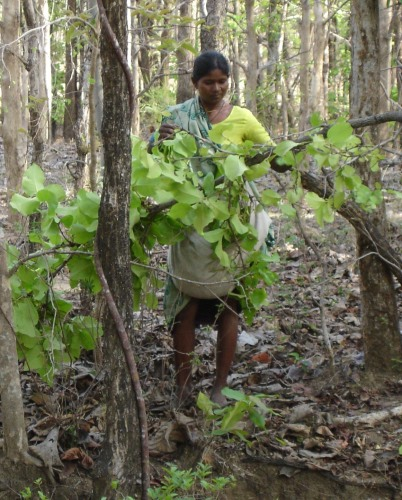
Tendu leaf, used to make rural cigarettes

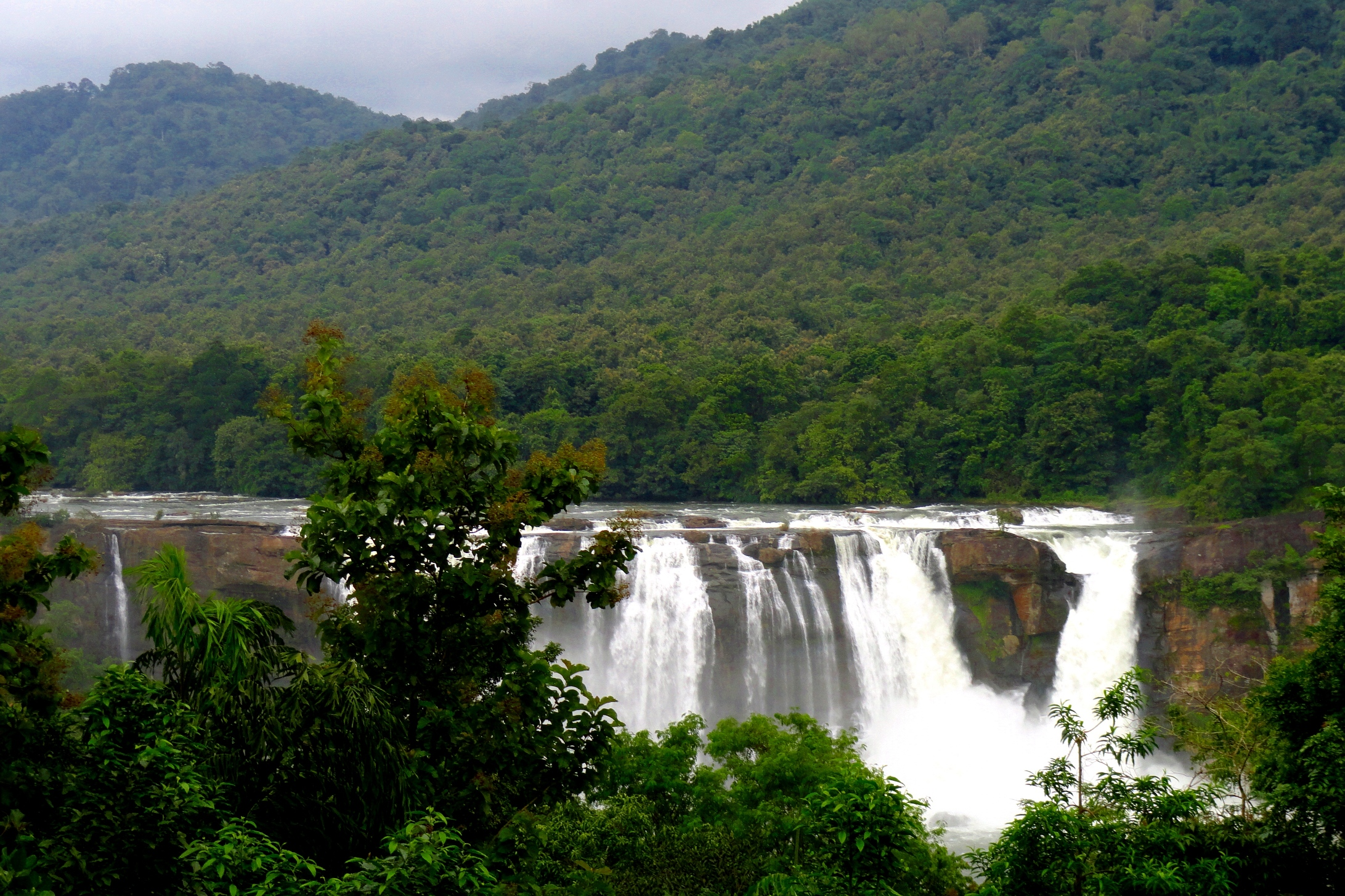
Forests of Kerala near Athirappalli Waterfalls

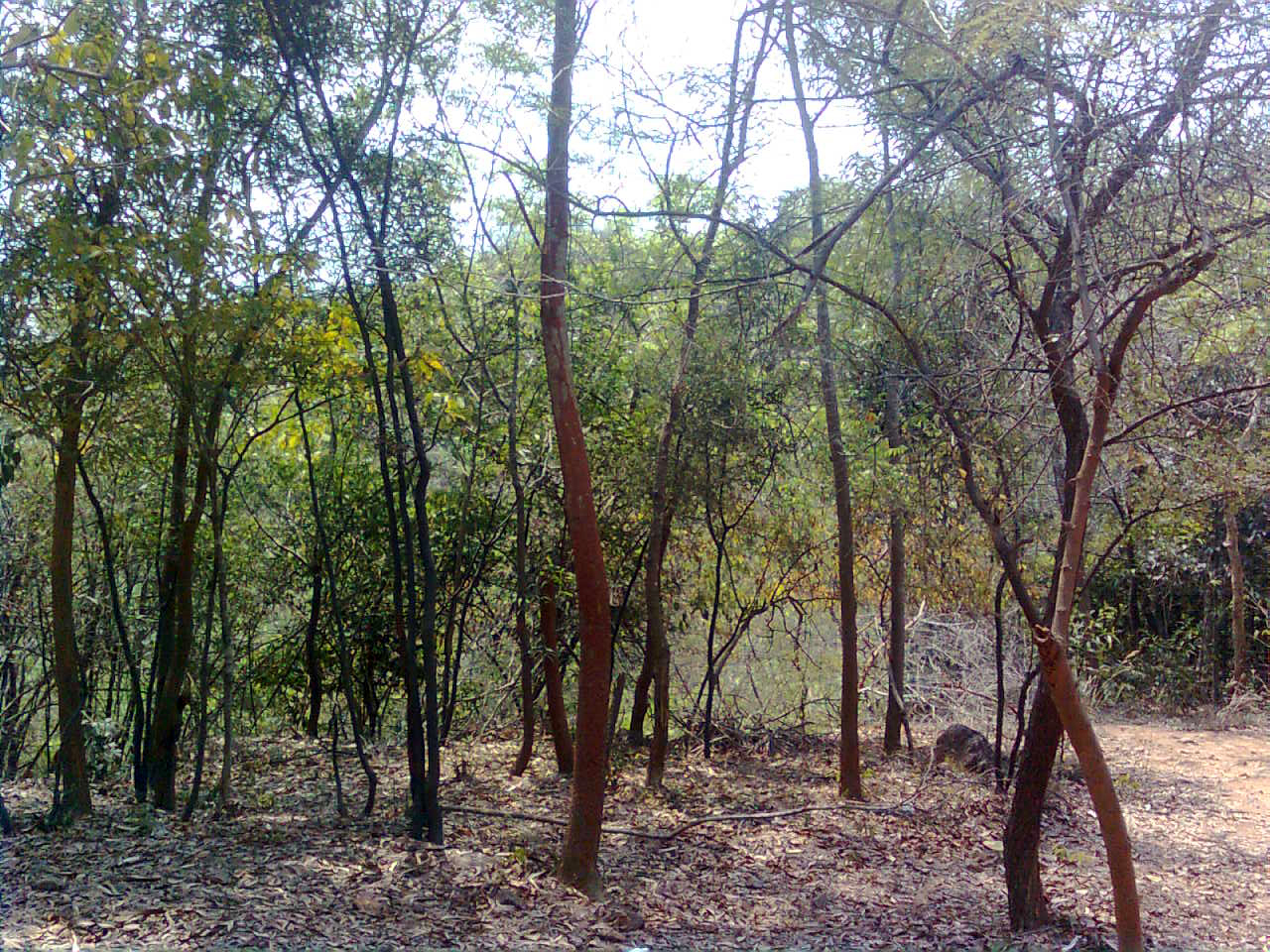
Dry Forests in Andhra Pradesh

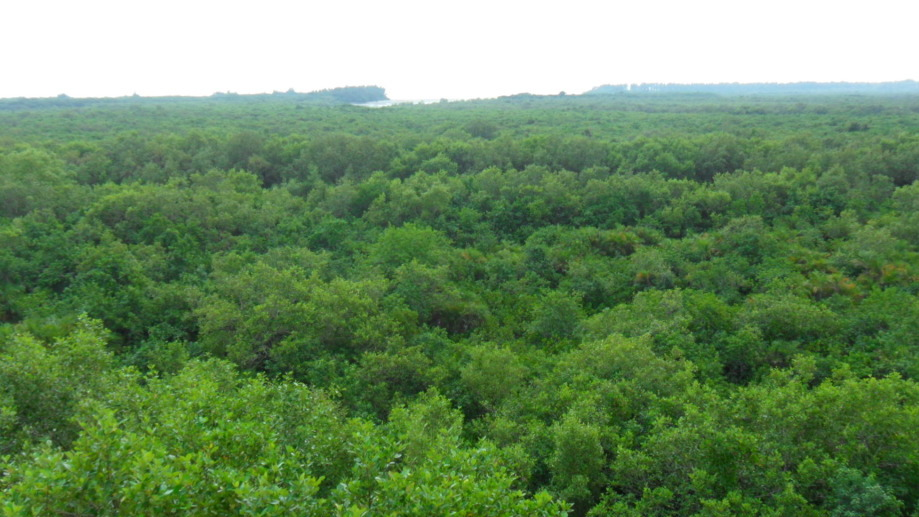
Mangrove forests of West Bengal

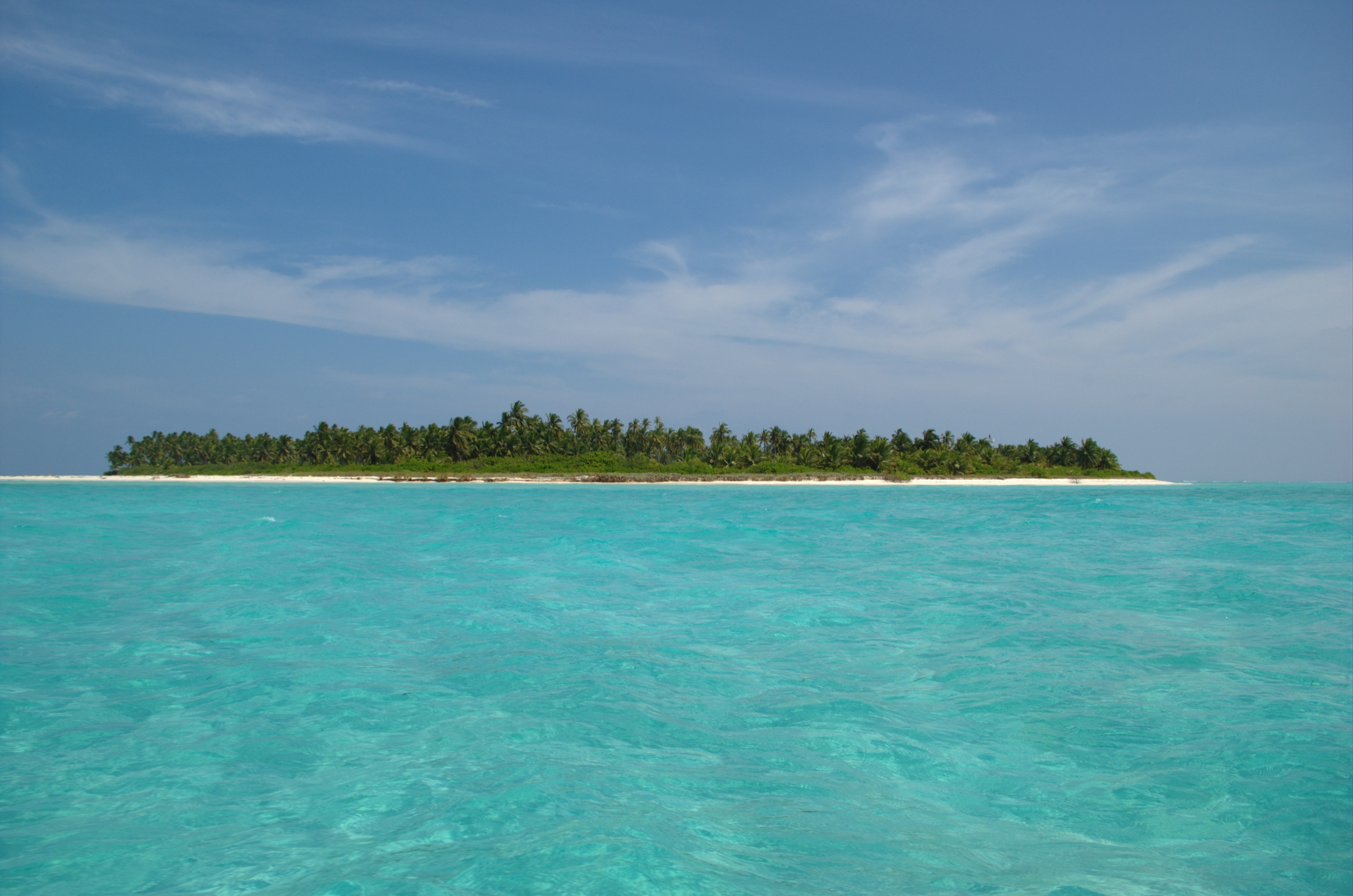
Forest cover in Lakshadweep

== See also ==
- Forests in India related
  - Bodhi Tree
  - Communal forests of India
  - List of banyan trees in India
  - Protected areas of India
  - Reserved forests and protected forests of India
  - Sacred groves of India
  - Social forestry in India
  - Wildlife of India
  - Mangroves in India
- Forestry entities in India
  - Arid Forest Research Institute
  - Indian Council of Forestry Research and Education
  - Indian Forest Service
  - List of forest research institutes in India
  - List of forestry technical schools in India
  - List of forestry universities and colleges in India
  - Van Vigyan Kendra, Forest Science Centres
