= Protected areas of India =

National Parks and Wildlife Sanctuaries in India (merged layer)

There are four categories of protected areas in India, constituted under the Wildlife Protection Act, 1972. Tiger reserves consist of areas under national parks and wildlife sanctuaries. There are 58 tiger reserves in India. As of January 2023, the protected areas of India cover 173,629.52 square kilometres (67,038.73 sq mi), roughly 5.28% of the total geographical area of the country.

== Classification ==
India has the following kinds of protected areas, in the sense of the word designated by IUCN:

- National parks
- Wildlife sanctuaries
- Biosphere reserves
- Reserved and protected forests
- Conservation reserves and community reserves
- Private protected areas
- Conservation areas

== National parks ==
National parks in India are IUCN category II protected areas. India's first national park was established in 1936 as Hailey National Park, now known as Jim Corbett National Park, Uttarakhand. By 1970, India only had five national parks. In 1972, India enacted the Wildlife Protection Act and Project Tiger in 1973 to safeguard the habitats of conservation reliant species. As of January 2023, India has 106 national parks covering 44,402.95 square kilometres (17,144.07 sq mi), roughly 1.35% of the total geographical area of the country.

== Wildlife sanctuaries ==
Wildlife sanctuaries of India are classified as IUCN Category IV protected areas. Between 1936 and 2022, 567 wildlife sanctuaries were established in the country that cover 122,564.86 km^{2} (47,322.56 sq mi), roughly 3.73% of the geographical area of the country. Among these, the 53 tiger reserves are governed by Project Tiger, and are of special significance for the conservation of the Bengal tiger.

== Biosphere reserves ==
The Indian government has established 18 biosphere reserves (categories roughly correspondingly to IUCN Category V Protected areas) to protect larger areas of natural habitat than a typical national park or animal sanctuary, and that often include one or more national parks or reserves, along with buffer zones that are open to some economic uses. Protection is granted not only to the flora and fauna of the protected region, but also to the human communities who inhabit these regions, and their ways of life.

== Reserved and protected forests ==
Reserved forests and protected forest (IUCN Category IV or VI, depending on protection accorded): These are forested lands where logging, hunting, grazing and other activities may be permitted on a sustainable basis to members of certain communities. In reserved forests, explicit permission is required for such activities. In protected forests, such activities are allowed unless explicitly prohibited. Thus, in general reserved forests enjoy a higher degree of protection with respect to protected forests.

== Conservation and community reserves ==
Conservation reserves and community reserves in India are terms denoting protected areas of India which typically act as buffer zones to or connectors and migration corridors between established national parks, wildlife sanctuaries and reserved and protected forests of India. Such areas are designated as conservation areas if they are uninhabited and completely owned by the Government of India but used for subsistence by communities, and community areas if part of the lands are privately owned. Administration of such reserves would be through local people and local agencies like the gram panchayat, as in the case of communal forests. (See Communal forests of India)

== Village and panchayat forests ==
A "Common Important Forest" in India is a forest governed by local communities in a way compatible with sustainable development. Such forests are typically called village forests or panchayat forests, reflecting the fact that the administration and resource use of the forest occurs at the village and panchayat (an elected rural body) levels. Hamlets, villages and communities of villages may actually administer such a forest. Such community forests are usually administered by a locally elected body, usually called the Forest Protection Committee, Village Forest Committee or the Village Forest Institution. Such committees are known as Van Panchayats in the Kumaon Division of Uttarakhand, Forest Co-operative Societies in Himachal Pradesh and Van Samrakshan Samitis in Andhra Pradesh. Legislation pertaining to communal forests vary from state to state, but typically the state government retains some administrative control over matters like staff appointment, and penalization of offenders. Such forests typically conform to the IUCN Category VI Protected Areas, but protection may be enforced by the local communities or the government depending on local legislation. Maharashtra is the state with the most forest land while Haryana has the least.

== Private protected areas ==
Private protected areas of India refer to protected areas inside India whose land rights are owned by an individual or a corporation / organization, and where the habitat and resident species are offered some kind of protection from exploitative activities like hunting, logging, etc. The Government of India did not provide any legal or physical protection to such entities, but in an important amendment introduced by the Wildlife (Protection) Amendment Act of 2002, has agreed to protect communally owned areas of ecological value.

== Conservation areas ==
Conservation Areas in India refer to well-demarcated large geographical entities with an established conservation plan, and were part of a joint Indo-US project on "landscape management and protection". The project ran from 1996 to 2002. These areas are home to many conservation reliant species.

== See also ==
- List of zoos in India
- List of types of formally designated forests
