= Forest produce (India) =

Forest produce is defined under section 2(4) of the Indian Forest Act, 1927. Its legal definition includes timber, charcoal, caoutchouc, catechu, wood-oil, resin, natural varnish, bark, lac, myrobalans, mahua flowers (whether found inside or brought from a forest or not), trees and leaves, flowers and fruit, plants (including grass, creepers, reeds and moss), wild animals, skins, tusks, horns, bones, cocoons, silk, honey, wax, other parts or produce of animals, and also includes peat, surface soil, rocks and minerals etc. when found inside or brought from a forest, among other things.

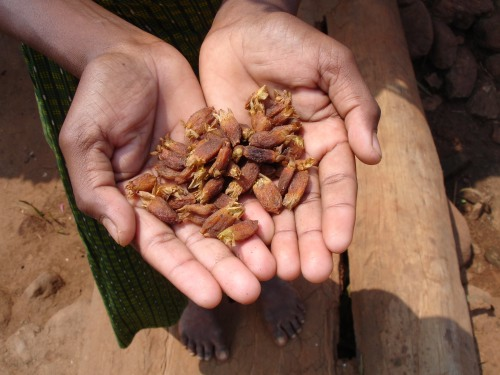
Mahua

Forest produce can be divided into several categories. From the point of view of usage, forest produce can be categorized into three types: Timber, Non Timber and Minor Minerals. Non-timber forest products [NTFPs] are known also as minor forest produce (MFP) or non-wood forest produce (NWFP). The NTFP can be further categorized into medicinal and aromatic plants (MAP), oil seeds, fiber and floss, resins, edible plants, bamboo, reeds and grasses.

== Wood products ==
=== Timber ===
The Odisha Forest Development Corporation (OFDC) trades timber in round and sawn forms, in different dimensions, from several depots. Round timbers are sold monthly from each depot, through general auction.

=== Sandalwood ===
The sandalwood tree is found in southern Indian forests, i.e. in Kerala, Tamil Nadu, Karnataka, etc.

=== Plywood ===
The plywood industry at Kuikeda near Saintala of Bolangir district, Odisha, was incorporated during 1983, and started commercial production during the year, 1986-87; it operated until 1992-93.

== Non-wood forest product ==
Non-timber forest product (NTFP) refers to all biological materials other than timber extracted from natural forests for human and animal use.

=== Kendu leaves ===
Orissa is the third largest producer of Kendu leaf in India. The uniqueness of kendu leaf in Orissa is because of its specification of Color, Texture, Size and Body condition of the leaf.

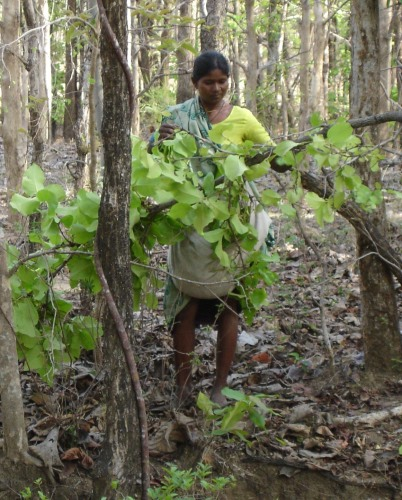
Tendu Patta (Leaf) Collection

=== Bamboo ===
The collection and marketing of Bamboo from the natural forest is done either by OFDC or through the RMP (Raw Material Procurer) as per the decision of the Government to regulate the collection and trade of Bamboo.

=== Sal seed ===
Sal seed is a nationalized product since 1973 and is one of the important Produce obtained from Sal (Shorea robursta) tree, which is predominantly available in Orissa.

=== Honey ===
OFDC is involved in collection, processing and trading of honey from natural forest with an assurance of pure and genuine quality.

=== Medicinal plants ===
With the financial aid of National Medicinal Plants Board, Government of India, 16 projects for promotional activities are currently running in Orissa.

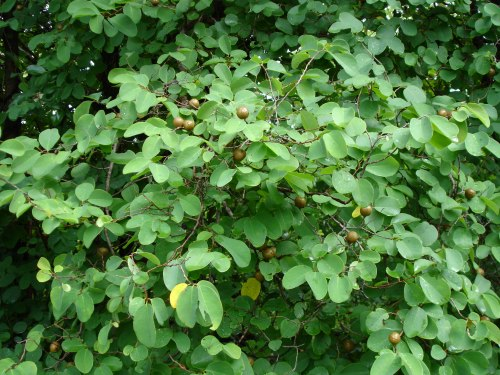
Medicinal Plant Karra

=== Rubber ===
OFDC is having rubber plantation and processing unit in Baripada and Bhubaneswar zone, since 2003. OFDC is extracting the rubber from the matured trees and marketing it.

=== Pickle and squash ===
OFDC is manufacturing and marketing high quality, delicious pickles such as Mango Pickle, Mixed Pickle – free from preservatives.

=== Cashew and spice ===
OFDC Ltd. have raised cashew plantation over an area of 18704.99 ha. from 1978-79 to 1992-93 in Bhubaneswar and Berhampur Division. Out of which pure cashew plantation over an area of 11,053.99 ha.

== Minerals ==
=== Biodiesel plant ===
Biodiesel is the name of a clean burning alternative fuel, produced from domestic, renewable resources. Biodiesel contains no petroleum, but it can be blended at any level with petroleum diesel to create a biodiesel blend.

== See also ==
- Forestry in India
- Indian Council of Forestry Research and Education
- Van Vigyan Kendra (VVK) Forest Science Centres
