= Reserved forests and protected forests of India =

A reserved forest (also called a reserve forest) and protected forest in India is a forest accorded a certain degree of protection. The concept was introduced in the Indian Forest Act of 1927 during the British Raj to refer to forests granted protection under the British crown in British India, but not associated suzerainties. After Indian independence, the Government of India retained the status of the reserved and protected forests, and extended protection to other forests. Many forests that came under the jurisdiction of the Government of India during the political integration of India were initially granted such protection.

Unlike National Parks or wildlife sanctuaries, reserved forests and protected forests are declared by the respective state governments. At present, reserved forests and protected forests differ in one important way: Activities including hunting, grazing, etc. in reserved forests are banned unless specific orders are issued otherwise. In protected forests, such activities are sometimes allowed for communities living on the fringes of the forest, who sustain their livelihood partially or wholly from forest resources or products.

== Reserved Forests ==
These are the forests, which enjoy judicial fortification based on legitimate systems. These are the protected forests with the natural habitat exhibiting a high degree of protection from any kind of poaching and hunting. These may also be utilized for the small and short contexts in various countries. The examples are Attappadi reserve forest in Kerala and Palani Hills forest conservation area in Tamil Nadu.

== Protected Forests ==
Protected forests are either demarcated or undemarcated, based on whether the limits of the forest have been specified by a formal notification.

A protected forest is land notified under the provisions of the Indian Forest Act or the State Forests Act. In protected forests, all activities are permitted unless they are expressly prohibited. A protected forest is land that is a reserved forest, and over which the government has property rights, as declared by a state government under section 29 of the Indian forest act 1927.

Protected forests and Reserved Forests can sometimes be made part of wildlife sanctuaries, which in turn may be upgraded to the status of national parks, with each category receiving a higher degree of protection and government funding. For example, Sariska National Park was declared a reserved forest in 1955, a wildlife sanctuary in 1958, and a Tiger Reserve in 1978, before becoming a national park in 1992. Wildlife Sanctuaries, National Parks and other wildlife areas enjoying legal protection under Wildlife (Protection) Act, 1972 are sometimes referred to with a generic name, “Protected Areas,” and this is not the same as Protected Forests.

== Effect of Tribal population growth on forest Flora and Fauna ==
Due to faster population growth in forest and tribal areas, naturally available forest resources (NTFP) are becoming inadequate to provide a basic livelihood to the increased population. Many tribal people are giving up their traditional livelihoods in favor of farming and cattle ranching in the forest areas. Once former protectors of forests, they are gradually becoming threats to the forests and their wildlife. Tribal people have deep understanding of forest flora and fauna that can be productively utilized if they can support their families while doing so.

== See also ==
- Communal forests of India
- Indian Council of Forestry Research and Education
- Forestry in India
- Adivasi
- List of Reserve Forests of India
- List of Protected areas in India
- Protected areas of India
- Nelapattu
- Van Vigyan Kendra (VVK) Forest Science Centers
