= List of Reserve Forests of India =

This is a sortable list of the major Reserve Forests of India.

| No | Name | State | Established | Area (in km^{2}) |
|---|---|---|---|---|
| 1 | Hanumasagara Reserve Forest | Karnataka | | 16.55 |
| 2 | Begur Reserve Forest | Kerala | | |
| 3 | Attappadi Reserve Forest | Kerala | | |
| 4 | Sholayar Reserve Forest | Kerala | | |
| 5 | Palani Hills Forest Conservation Area | Tamil Nadu | | |
| 6 | Kondapalli Reserve Forest | Andhra Pradesh | | 120 |
| 7 | Behali Reserved Forest | Assam | 1917 | 140 |

== See also ==
- Indian Council of Forestry Research and Education

Veeyapuram is a place in kerala is surrounded by the Pamba and Achankovil rivers. This village is under Kuttanad sector and has many paddy fields and streams from both of these rivers. About 15 acre of land belongs to forest department was declared as reserve forest by Kerala forest department in 2013.
