= Indian Forest Act, 1927 =

Indian legislation

Imperial Legislative Council
- Long title: An Act to consolidate the law relating to forests, the transit of forest-produce and the duty leviable on timber and other forest-produce.
- Citation: Act No. 16 of 1927
- Territorial extent: Whole of India
- Enacted by: Imperial Legislative Council
- Commenced: 21 September 1927
- Status: In force

The Indian Forest Act, 1927 was largely based on previous Indian Forest Acts implemented under the British Raj. The most famous one was the Indian Forest Act of 1878. Both the 1878 Act and the 1927 Act sought to consolidate and reserve the areas having forest cover, or significant wildlife, to regulate movement and transit of forest produce, and duty leviable on timber and other forest produce. It also defines the procedure to be followed for declaring an area to be a Reserved Forest, a Protected Forest or a Village Forest. It defines what is a forest offence, what are the acts prohibited inside a Reserved Forest, and penalties leviable on violation of the provisions of the Act.

== History ==
Dietrich Brandis set up the Indian Forest Service in 1864 and helped formulate the Indian Forest Act of 1865. The Indian Forest Act of 1865 extended the British colonialism in India and claimed over forests in India. The 1865 act was a precursor to the Forest Act of 1878, which truncated the centuries-old traditional use by communities of their forests and secured the colonial governments control over the forestry. The act of 1865 empowered the British government to declare any land covered with trees as a government forest and make rules to manage it. The government mainly used the woods for railway sleepers manufacture. This law also made teak wood a government property.

== Reserved forest ==
Reserved Forest is an area mass of land duly notified under the provisions of India Forest Act or the State Forest Acts having full degree of protection. In Reserved Forests, all activities are prohibited unless permitted.

Reserved Forest is notified under section 20 of the Indian Forest Act, 1927 [Act 16 of 1927] or under the reservation provisions of the Forest acts of the State Governments. It is within power of a State Government to issue a preliminary notification under section 4 of the Act declaring that it has been decided to constitute such land, as specified in a Schedule with details of its location, area and boundary description, into a Reserved Forest. Such a notification also appoints an officer of the State Government, normally the Deputy Commissioner of the concerned district, as Forest Settlement Officer.

The Forest Settlement Officer fixes a period not less than three months, to hear the claims and objections of every person having or claiming any rights over the land which is so notified to be reserved. He conducts inquiries into the claims of rights, and may reject or accept the same. He is empowered even to acquire land over which right is claimed. For rights other than that of right of way, right of pasture, right to forest produce, or right to a water course, the Forest Settlement Officer may exclude such land in whole or in part, or come to an agreement with the owner for surrender of his rights, or proceed to acquire such land in the manner prescribed under the Land Acquisition Act, 1894 [Act 1 of 1894].

Once the Forest Settlement Officer settles all the rights either by admitting them or rejecting them, as per the provisions of the Act, and has heard appeals, if any, and settled the same, all the rights with the said piece land, boundaries of which might have been altered or modified during the settlement process, vest with the State Government. Thereafter, the State Government issues notification under section 20 of the Indian Forest Act, 1927 declaring that piece of land to be a Reserved Forest.

== See also ==
- Reserved forests and protected forests of India
- Communal forests of India
- Biological Diversity Act, 2002
- Indian Council of Forestry Research and Education
