= Communal forests of India =

A "Common Important Forest" in India is a forest governed by local communities in a way compatible with sustainable development. Such forests are typically called village forests or panchayat forests, reflecting the fact that the administration and resource use of the forest occurs at the village and panchayat (an elected rural body) levels. Hamlets, villages and communities of villages may actually administer such a forest. Such community forests are usually administered by a locally elected body, usually called the Forest Protection Committee, Village Forest Committee or the Village Forest Institution. Such committees are known as Van Panchayats in the Kumaon Division of Uttarakhand, Forest Co-operative Societies in Himachal Pradesh and Van Samrakshan Samitis in Andhra Pradesh. Legislation pertaining to communal forests varies from state to state, but typically the state government retains some administrative control over matters like staff appointment, and penalization of offenders. Such forests typically conform to the IUCN Category VI Protected Areas, but protection may be enforced by the local communities or the government depending on local legislation. Maharashtra is the state with the most forest land while Haryana has the least.

== History of communal forests ==
Many village communities in India have traditionally used forests on a sustainable basis. However, the British Rule in India introduced several legislations in the 19th century curtailing the rights of local people from using forest resources. These included the Forest Act, 1865 and Forest Policy, 1894. While some of the legislation was enacted in a bid to enact restrictions on forest usage for the purpose of sustenance, it was also motivated partly because such legislation provided a legal basis for the British Raj to acquire valuable forest resources like timber for crucial initiatives like the Indian Railways. The British completely changed the way Indian forests were before.

Such abrupt curtailment of rights caused protests in forest-dwelling communities in India, especially in the heavily forested Kumaon region, and in what is present day Uttarakhand. The issues of such communities were addressed in the Indian Forest Act, 1927, which initiated the development of village forests for sustainable use by villagers dwelling in or on the fringes of the forest. The Van Panchayat Act of 1931 further expanded the idea of local administration and management of forests, even though the first Van Panchayats were formed as early as 1921.

Following the independence of India in 1947, the Government of India instituted the National Forest Policy, 1952 which classified forested areas into: Protected forests areas, National forests, Village forests and Tree lands Common Trees Between living places of People. Laws regarding village forests were based on the state legislature. Numerous state laws and acts regarding communal forests were enacted before 1990, including the UP Van Panchayat Rules in 1976, and the Orissa Village Forest Rules in 1985.

However, such communal forest development and management came to the forefront only after the National Forest Policy, 1988. The National Forest Policy strongly suggested the idea of empowering and involving local communities in the protection and development of forests. A direct outcome of the National Forest Policy, 1988 was the Joint Forest Management Program (JFM or JFMP) instituted in 1990 by the Government of India. It was started on a pilot project basis in West Bengal as early as 1971, and again in the late 1980s with considerable success.

The JFPM calls for the existence of an elected village level organisation (VLO) which would actively administer and maintain the communal forest. Such an organization is sometimes an existing elected body, like the gram sabha, or gram panchayat. However, a new body is usually elected for administrative purposes, usually referred to as the Forest Protection Committee (FPC), but known as the Van Panchayat in the Kumaon region.

As of September, 2003 all 28 state governments had initiated the JFPM, and many had passed appropriate legislation as well. According to the 2002-03 Annual Report of the Ministry of Environment and Forests, there were 84,000 JFM committees which controlled 170,000 square kilometres of forest in India.

The introduction of the protected area category community reserves under the Wildlife (Protection) Amendment Act of 2002 has introduced legislation for providing government protection to community held lands. While this does not pertain to communal forest sites, communally owned forests may be candidates for protection under such legislation. (See Conservation reserves and community reserves of India)

== Types of communal forests ==
Typically, communal forests are formed in two ways:

- Joint forest management program: Designation of marked areas in reserved forests and protected forests of India as a communal forest for villages inside the reserved or protected forest or in the fringe areas. More infrequently, an existing forest may be directly designated as a communal forest.
- Social forestry program: Afforestation schemes in disused farm lands, degraded forests or other wasteland. Such community afforestation schemes are referred to as social forestry in India. See Social forestry in India for details.

Other forms of communally managed forests exist in India, but do not enjoy any form of legal protection if the Government of India is not a collaborator. The two major forms of such communal forests are:

- Community forest management programs: These are typically collaborations between local villagers and non-governmental organizations for the purposes of according protection to a tract of forest. The responsibility of the participants are increased without legislation protecting such areas. However, as the government is not involved in such work directly, a much larger share of the proceeds from the forest resources go to the villagers. Recently, the Government of India has also acknowledged and legally protected several such communal forests. In such collaborations, the Government retains a far smaller and less powerful role with respect to the role in the Joint Forest Management Program. The new Rajaji National Park is being built on such a model.
- Indigenous forest management programs: These are indigenous initiatives taken by local villagers alone to save forested lands. Typically, these lands are protected on a religious basis. Responsibility for the protection is often shared by the community in turns The most famous communal forests of this type are the "sacred groves" of India, which are protected for local deities and contain great biodiversity and many rare flora in small forested regions. See sacred groves of India for details. it should be searched.

== Community forests in North East India ==
In North East India community forest management is most prevalent, where people are managing their forest resources since time immemorial. Mostly these communities manage these forests for variety of reasons, including resource enhancement and/or maintenance, countering ecological threat, expressing religious sentiments, cultural concerns and/or continuing traditional systems, political expression and managing biodiversity concerns.

== External funding ==
Funding for such communal forest management and staff training usually comes from the Government of India, but often comes from external non-governmental agencies. Notably, the World Bank has put forward several large loans for the purposes of accomplishing such projects, including a statewide co-operative drive in Andhra Pradesh in 2002. This project was, however, criticized for lacking transparency and focus.

== See also ==
- Indian Council of Forestry Research and Education
- Van Vigyan Kendra (VVK) Forest Science Centres
