= Harry Jonas =

Lawyer

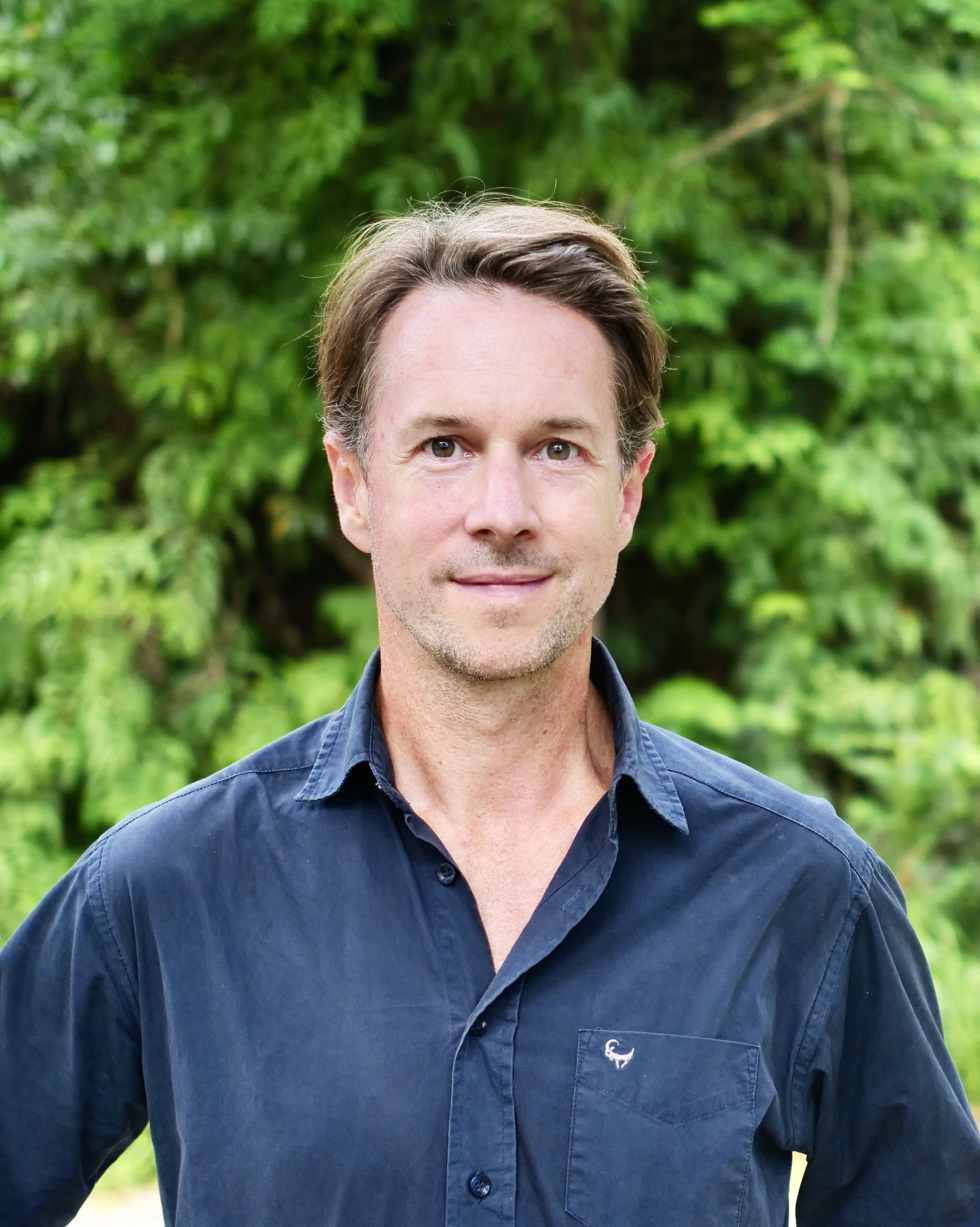
- Jonas in 2021.
- Born: Kent, United Kingdom
- Occupations: International lawyer social entrepreneur
- Employer: World Wildlife Fund
- Known for: Contributions to legal empowerment and area-based conservation
- Parents: Johnny Jonas (father); Elizabeth Emma Jonas (mother)
- Relatives: Judith Mayhew Jonas (aunt) Charles W. Tyrrell (grandfather)

Harry Driver Jonas is a British international lawyer and social entrepreneur, best known for his contributions to legal empowerment and area-based conservation. He advanced the theory and practice of community protocols to affirm Indigenous peoples’ rights over their territories and traditional knowledge, and was instrumental in developing the international framework for other effective area-based conservation measures to better recognize biodiversity stewardship beyond protected areas. As of February 2026, OECMs cover over 226 million hectares of the Earth's surface.

== Early life and education ==
Jonas was born in Kent, in southern England. He is the son of Elizabeth Emma Jonas, a teacher and author, and Johnny Jonas, a British painter. His aunt, Judith Mayhew Jonas, was the first female Provost of King's College Cambridge. His grandfather, Charles William Tyrrell, co-founded the Booker Prize. Jonas was raised with his brother, Django Jonas, in Liguria, Italy, and subsequently attended schools in England and universities in England and the United States. He drew on his degrees in politics and law to develop a theoretical framework in his doctoral dissertation that he describes as "legal-political ecology", which integrates concepts from jurisprudence, Indigenous peoples' declarations, legal pluralism, critical legal studies, critical pedagogy and political ecology.

== Career ==
=== Natural Justice and community protocols ===
Jonas completed his legal training contract at Trowers and Hamlins. In 2007, Jonas and Sanjay Kabir Bavikatte co-founded Natural Justice: Lawyers for Communities and the Environment in South Africa, as a not-for-profit organization specializing in legal empowerment and public interest law with a focus on human rights and environmental justice. While working with the Khomani San people and living in Upington, South Africa, Jonas advanced community protocols as a participatory legal awareness methodology and advocacy tool. Community protocols were included in the Nagoya Protocol in 2010. Indigenous peoples and local communities can now publish their protocols on the Access and Benefit Sharing Clearing-House to protect their interests.

=== Other effective area-based conservation measures ===
Jonas moved to Sabah, a Malaysian state in Borneo, in 2010 as part of his work on human rights and environmental issues. In 2014, Jonas, Ashish Kothari and other activists affiliated with the ICCA Consortium proposed that defining the term other effective area-based conservation measures (OECMs) offered an opportunity to better recognize the conservation of biodiversity by diverse groups in sites "beyond protected areas". Jonas co-chaired the International Union for Conservation of Nature (IUCN) World Commission on Protected Areas Task Force on OECMs with Kathy MacKinnon, from 2016-2018, which delivered its report to Parties to the Convention on Biological Diversity in 2017. Decision 14/8 on protected areas and other effective area-based conservation measures was agreed in 2018, setting out the international definition and criteria for OECMs. Jonas co-chaired the IUCN Specialist Group on OECMs from 2019-2025. In 2022, OECMs were referenced in Target 3 of the Kunming-Montreal Global Biodiversity Framework, which calls for the conservation of at least 30% of the Earth. As of February 2026, OECMs cover over 226 million hectares of the Earth's surface.

Jonas’s work on the OECM framework is considered to have “caused a paradigm shift in area-based conservation”. In a Mongabay article, Jonas was quoted as saying that the OECM framework requires government agencies and other conservation actors to be "more inclusive and more focused on conservation outcomes". In 2021, Jonas became Senior Director for conservation areas at the World Wildlife Fund, based in Washington, DC, which is part of a network of organizations affiliated with the World Wide Fund for Nature.

== Media and publications ==
=== Films ===
In 2021, Jonas produced Nature Stewardship Beyond Protected Areas, a documentary film about local conservation efforts in South Africa.

=== Written publications ===
Jonas is the author or co-author of over 60 publications exploring human rights, legal empowerment, conservation justice, protected areas, other effective area-based conservation measures, and global advances in area-based conservation. Works of note are listed below.

==== Journal articles ====
- "Equitable and effective area-based conservation: Towards the conserved areas paradigm". PARKS IUCN (2021)
- "Biodiversity needs every tool in the box: Use OECMs". Nature (2021)
- "Area-based conservation in the 21st Century". Nature (2021)
- "Are conserved areas conservation’s most compelling story?". PARKS IUCN (2019)
- "Other effective area-based conservation measures: From Aichi Target 11 to the post-2020 Biodiversity Framework". PARKS IUCN (2018)
- "A spatial overview of the importance of Indigenous lands for conservation". Nature Sustainability (2018)
- "Will other effective area-based conservation measures increase recognition and support for ICCAs?". PARKS IUCN (2017)
- "New steps of change: Looking beyond protected areas to consider other effective area-based conservation measures". PARKS IUCN (2014).

==== Books and Practitioner Resources ====
- "Site-level Tool for Identifying Other Effective Area-based Conservation Measures (OECMs)". IUCN (2023)
- "The Living Convention: An Accessible Compendium of the International Rights of Indigenous Peoples, Local Communities and Peasants (Volume I)". Natural Justice (2020)
- "The Living Convention: A Methodology for Counter-mapping and Recentering International Law (Volume II)". Natural Justice (2020)
- "Recognising and Reporting Other Effective Area-based Conservation Measures". IUCN (2019)
- "Conservation Standards: From Rights to Responsibilities". IIED (2016)
- "The Right to Responsibility: Resisting and Engaging Development, Conservation and the Law in Asia". UNU and Natural Justice (2013)
- "Biocultural Community Protocols Toolkit for Community Facilitators". Natural Justice (2012)
- "Biocultural Community Protocols: A Community Approach to Ensuring the Integrity of Environmental Law and Policy". Natural Justice (2009)

==== Op-Eds and Commentary ====
- "Global agreement on ‘conserved areas’ marks new era of conservation". Mongabay (2018)
- "Shifting the debate about conservation justice from rights to responsibilities". Mongabay (2016)
- "An end to unjust conservation". Mongabay (2015)

== Honors and awards ==
Jonas was elected as an Ashoka Global Fellow in 2011 for social entrepreneurship relating to his work on legal awareness and community protocols. The work was considered to be "transforming the way the legal profession thinks about empowering communities, and spearheading a new field of public interest environmental law that places community rights at the heart of the legislation process rather than at the periphery". He was awarded the International Biodiversity Legal Specialist Award in 2022, being described by Marie-Claire Cordonier Segger, who presented the award, as having "exemplary insights, knowledge, and dedication to furthering biodiversity and sustainable development throughout the world." He is a fellow at the Centre for International Sustainable Development Law and the United Nations Environment Programme World Conservation Monitoring Centre.

== See also ==
- Natural Justice: Lawyers for Communities and the Environment
- Other effective-area-based conservation measures
