= Governance of protected areas =

Conservation is an endeavor including "the preservation, maintenance, sustainable use, restoration, and enhancement of the natural environment".

A Protected Area is "a clearly defined geographical space, recognized, dedicated, and managed, through legal or other effective means, to achieve the long-term conservation of nature with associated ecosystem services and cultural values".

This IUCN definition applies equally to land, inland waters, and coastal and marine territories and areas, and is widely considered to be equivalent to the CBD definition.

Governance is the process of "interactions among structures, processes and traditions that determine how power and responsibilities are exercised, how decisions are taken and how citizens or other stakeholders have their say…".

It refers to the manner in which responsibility is owned and discharged.

Systems for governance of Protected Areas are under continuing evolution.

== Governance at the IUCN World Parks Congress ==
The IUCN World Parks Congress is held once every decade. Since the Congress in Durban (2003), governance has been a recurring stream in the deliberations of the Congress. Governance was also a major stream at the IUCN World Parks Congress 2014. The stream published a primer to develop a basic lexicon in the hope that speaking "a common language" may help to better communicate and develop concepts with increasing clarity and meaning.

== Governance Diversity ==
Governance diversity for protected and conserved areas is when decisions are made by a variety of actors who enrich and strengthen conservation in practice. For instance, a national system of protected areas can "enhance governance diversity" by including in the system areas governed by different types of players and under different arrangements, and/or by providing better recognition and support to conserved territories and areas outside the system.

=== Four main governance types ===
The IUCN and CBD distinguish four broad governance types for protected and conserved areas according to the actors who take or took the fundamental decisions about them (e.g. the actors that "established" them and decided their main purpose and management). The four main governance types are:

- Type A: governance by the government (at various levels and possibly combining various agencies)
- Type B: governance by various rights holders and stakeholders together (shared governance)
- Type C: governance by private individuals and organizations (usually the landholders)
- Type D: governance by indigenous peoples and/or local communities (often referred to as ICCAs)

=== ICCAs ===
ICCAs is an abbreviation that refers to the territories and areas conserved by indigenous peoples and local communities. There are three essential characteristics common to ICCAs:

- an indigenous people or local community possesses a close and profound elation with a site (territory, area, or habitat)
- the people or community is the major player in decision-making related to the site and has de facto and/or de jure capacity to develop and enforce regulations.
- the people's or community's decisions and efforts lead to the conservation of biodiversity, ecological functions, and associated cultural values, regardless of original or primary motivations.

Management categories and governance types are independent and can be juxtaposed in the "IUCN Matrix", visualizing a spectrum of area-based options to conserve nature in a given region/system. The IUCN Matrix can be used to situate protected areas but also conserved territories and areas (the management category, in such case, would not correspond to a key objective but to an observed result).

Conservation depends on well-governed systems of protected and conserved areas in the landscape and seascape and systems are made stronger by governance diversity.

=== Conserved Territories or Areas ===
Conserved territories or areas are "…area-based measures that— regardless of recognition and dedication and at times even regardless of explicit and conscious management practices— achieve conservation de facto and/or is in a positive conservation trend and likely to maintain this trend in the long term…". This definition applies equally to land, inland waters, and coastal and marine territories and areas. The governance types apply to both protected areas and conserved territories and areas that are NOT recognized as "protected" by the IUCN or any specific national government. In this sense, the terms "Privately Conserved Areas" and "ICCAs" encompass extents of land, inland waters, and coastal and marine territories and areas that go beyond those recognized as "protected" by either the national government or the IUCN.

=== Voluntary and ancillary conservation ===
Many systems of land and water management support high levels of biodiversity, including critical biodiversity, outside the formal system of protected areas, in sites such as tourism and commercial hunting reserves, private estates, or village forests. The term voluntary conservation captures the idea that those who exercise governance do so consciously and without restriction, in ways that are fully compatible with conserving biodiversity values while they may or may not see conservation as the primary objective of their management efforts. In other cases, as in military no-go areas or areas abandoned after a natural or man-made disaster, the term ancillary conservation is more appropriate, since conservation is an entirely unintended (though welcome) consequence of management for other purposes. Conservation in the landscape and seascape is the result of various area-based and non-area-based measures. Among area-based measures, there are both protected areas and conserved territories and areas. Crucially, those should be biologically, but also socially, well connected.

=== Systems of protected and conserved areas ===
A well-functioning system of protected and conserved areas is complete and well-connected in conserving the representative features and functions of nature in a given environment. Each protected area governance type can also contribute in different ways towards conservation goals, with the complementary and/or overlapping management of conservation features.

=== Other effective area-based conservation measures (OECMs) ===
The term "other effective area-based conservation measures"– abbreviated as OECMs—is used by the Convention on Biological Diversity to refer to territories and areas that are effectively conserved but not part of the official protected area system of a given country. In this sense, OECMs can be seen as "clearly defined geographical space where de facto conservation of nature and associated ecosystem services and cultural values is achieved and expected to be maintained in the long-term regardless of specific recognition and dedication" (11). OECMs can include the following:

- Primary voluntary conservation that the national government does not wish to recognize as a protected area
- Primary voluntary conservation that refuses the protected area label and/or inclusion in the national system (e.g. because of self-determination and self-governance issues)
- Secondary voluntary conservation
- Ancillary conservation with a reasonable expectation to be maintained in the long-term

The following Table summarizes various ways of classifying conservation efforts and results:

Conserved areas (conserved de facto with a reasonable expectation that conservation will be maintained in the long term)	Conservation of nature is the primary management objective	Conservation of nature is not the primary management objective
The State government recognizes it as part of its system of protected areas	The area is a protected area both according to the IUCN and in the country at stake	The area is a protected area in the country at stake, although not internationally; it likely comprises voluntary conservation; it can comprise ancillary conservation; it can be considered an OECM from an international point
The State government does not recognize it as part of its system of protected areas	The area is a protected area according to the IUCN (but not recognized as such nationally); the area most likely comprises voluntary conservation; the IUCN recommends to nationally consider it as an OECM	The area is neither recognized as a protected area nationally nor internationally; it likely comprises voluntary conservation and/or ancillary conservation; the area can be considered nationally as an OECM

== Governance quality ==
=== IUCN principles of good governance for protected areas ===
We speak of governance quality when decisions are made while respecting the "good governance" principles developed through time by a variety of peoples, nations, and UN agencies. A simple and compact formulation of the "IUCN principles of good governance for protected areas", includes:

- Legitimacy and voice— i.e. enjoying broad acceptance and appreciation in society; ensuring procedural rights of access to information, participation, and justice; fostering engagement and diversity; preventing discrimination; fostering subsidiarity, mutual respect, dialogue, consensus, and agreed rules...
- Direction— i.e. following an inspiring and consistent strategic vision grounded on agreed values and an appreciation of complexities; ensuring consistency with policy and practice at various levels; ensuring clear answers to contentious questions; ensuring proper adaptive management and favouring the emergence of champions and tested innovations...
- Performance—i.e. achieving conservation and other objectives as planned; promoting a culture of learning; engaging in advocacy and outreach; being responsive to the needs of rights holders and stakeholders; ensuring resources and capacities and their efficient use; promoting sustainability and resilience...
- Accountability—i.e. upholding integrity and commitment; ensuring appropriate access to information and transparency, including for lines of responsibility, allocation of resources, and evaluation of performances; establishing communication avenues and encouraging feedback and independent overseeing...
- Fairness and rights—i.e. striving towards equitably shared costs and benefits, without adverse impact for vulnerable people; upholding decency and the dignity of all; being fair, impartial, consistent, non-discriminatory, respectful of procedural rights as well as substantive rights, individual and collective human rights, gender equity and the rights of indigenous peoples, including Free, Prior and Informed Consent; promoting local empowerment in conservation.

Given these principles, a "good governance" situation is when decisions are taken legitimately, competently, fairly, and all while respecting rights.

=== Equitable and effective governance ===
The IUCN good governance situation can also be summed up as "equitable and effective governance". The criteria of legitimacy, voice, fairness, and (procedural and substantive) rights contribute to equitable governance. The criteria of direction, performance, and accountability lead to governance that is effective.

=== Substantive and procedural rights ===
Rights are usefully distinguished between substantive and procedural. Procedural rights, such as the rights to information, participation, and access to justice, govern the process of determining and adjudicating substantive rights. In turn, substantive rights refer to the specific powers and obligations of individuals and collective bodies under accepted customs and legislation. They span from basic human rights (e.g. life, liberty) to material and financial rights under specific contractual conditions (e.g. access to a given territory). Procedural and substantive rights deserve respect in relation to both protected and conserved areas and territories.

== Governance vitality ==
Governance vitality is when decision-making actors and institutions are functional, responsive, and thriving, meeting their roles and responsibilities in timely and appropriate ways. Vitality is expressed by several of these properties.

- Integration and connectivity —i.e. having abundant and meaningful interactions with diverse actors, sectors, and levels of decision-making in society, including those interactions that characterize a system versus scattered and isolated single protected areas, and those interactions that render decisions effective through the generation of political, social and financial support.
- Adaptability –i.e. being reflexive and flexible, able to accommodate circumstances, integrate knowledge from different cultures, learn from experience, and weigh options through dialogue, exchanges, experiment, and debate... able to take rapid and meaningful decisions even under challenging circumstances...
- Wisdom —i.e. being aware and respectful of the socio-ecological history and traditional worldviews, knowledge, and values of the relevant environment and communities; governing situations of meaningful scope (e.g. regarding the size and coherence of the units to manage, the number of actors to involve...) and in line with solidarity rather than self-interest only (e.g. sharing benefits, avoiding accumulation and waste, keeping in mind future generations); not only allowing, but fostering the engagement of as many relevant actors in society as possible...
- Innovation and creativity — i.e. openness to new IDs, ability to re-invent and renew itself as only a living system does, ability to conceive and implement new solutions, support the emergence of new rules and norms, respond positively to change, and continue to develop...
- Empowerment – i.e. being self-conscious, self-directed, willing, and capable of demonstrating leadership, such as by organizing timely responses to emerging environmental conditions, problems, and opportunities... but also being self-disciplined and self-critical, able to take on responsibilities in effective and dependable ways...

While governance diversity and quality have been explored rather exhaustively, the concept of governance vitality has only recently been identified for further consideration. All governance properties are open to enrichment and debate.

== How does governance improve? ==
The IUCN and CBD have recently published a volume of guidelines for assessing, evaluating, and planning for action with a view to improving governance for a system of protected areas or a specific site. In both cases, the methodology begins with an analysis of the historical, socio-cultural, institutional, and legal contexts. It then proceeds with a spatial analysis of governance in regard to the status of the conservation of nature. This requires a large, territorial view of the region or area under consideration, including an assessment of biological, ecological, and cultural values and their potential association with governance diversity, quality, and vitality. From that, valuable lessons can be derived and action plans for improvement can be drawn.

Globally, there remains a need to initiate such systematic governance assessments and evaluation processes in a range of contexts, with the aim and expectation that they will catalyse enhanced diversity, quality, and vitality. A structured program of governance assessments, supported by learning and capacity development networks is a short- and medium-term priority to strengthen both conservation policies and results.

== See also ==
- Bennett, A.F., Linkages in the Landscape: The Role of Corridors and Connectivity in Wildlife Conservation, IUCN, Switzerland) and Cambridge (UK), 1999.
- Deaden, P., M. Bennett, J. Johnston, "Trends in Global Protected Area Governance 1992-2002". In: Environmental Management, Volume 36, July 2005, pp. 89–100.
- IUCN WCPA, Trans boundary Conservation: A systematic and integrated approach, Best Practice Protected Area Guidelines Series, Gland, Switzerland, 2014 (forthcoming).
- Jaireth, H. and D. Smyth, Innovative Governance, Anne Books, Delhi, 2003.
- Kothari, A., "Protected areas and people: the future of the past", Parks, 17, 2:23-34, 2006. Stolton, S., K. Redford and N. Dudley, The Futures of Privately Protected Areas, Best Practice Protected Area Guidelines Series Gland, Switzerland, 2014 (forthcoming).
- CBD Secretariat http://www.cbd.int/protected/
- ICCA Consortium: http://www.iccaconsortium.org/
- IUCN-Global Protected Area Programme (GPAP) on Governance: www.iucn.org/pa_governance
- UNEP WCMC protected area database http://www.protectedplanet.net/
