= Almargem =

Portuguese environmental NGO

Almargem - Associação de Defesa do Património Cultural e Ambiental do Algarve
- Purpose: Environmentalism: Conservation; Ecology
- Headquarters: Loulé, Portugal

Almargem is a non-profit association founded in Loulé, Portugal in June 1988. The main purposes of Almargem are the study and sharing of the most significant historical, cultural, and natural values of the Algarve, the safeguard of these same values and the promotion of activities pursuing nature respectful local development. Almargem is an environmental non-governmental organization (ENGO) of regional scope, being registered in the Portuguese Environment Agency.
