= Kathy MacKinnon =

British zoologist and conservationist

- Born: 28 February 1948; Newcastle-upon-Tyne, UK
- Died: 18 March 2023 (aged 75)
- Education: University of Oxford
- Scientific career
- Fields: Zoology and conservation
- Workplaces: World Bank; International Union for Conservation of Nature

Kathy MacKinnon (28 February 1948 – 18 March 2023) was a zoologist committed to conservation who worked with many governmental organisations and NGOs. She was the lead biodiversity specialist at the World Bank for 16 years and chaired the World Commission on Protected Areas of the International Union for Conservation of Nature from 2015 until 2021.

== Early life and education ==
Kathy MacKinnon was born in Newcastle-upon-Tyne, UK on 28 February 1948. She studied at the University of Oxford and was awarded BA (Honours) in Zoology in 1969, followed by a master's degree and then a D.Phil. degree for work in zoology in 1976.

== Career ==
MacKinnon spent a decade working in the field on tropical ecology in Indonesia and became recognised for her knowledge and expertise. Her focus developed into the planning and management of protecting areas because of their conservation value, and she worked for another 20 years on other conservation projects around the world taking leadership roles to apply knowledge to conservation of biodiversity, natural resources and the issues of local communities living in these regions. She was a member of several national and international committees and organisations working on nature conservation. She was the lead biodiversity specialist at the World Bank for 16 years (1994–2010), and led the consideration of conservation within all development programmes. She was a member of the leadership of Wetlands International from 2011 until 2021 and encouraged the organisation's involvement in the conservation of peatlands. She was the deputy chair of the IUCN World Commission on Protected Areas followed by two terms as Chair (2015 until 2021), having been involved with the organisation since 2010. MacKinnon co-chaired the IUCN WCPA Specialist Group on Other Effective Area-based Conservation Measures with Harry Jonas from 2016 to 2023, which included securing a decision by Parties to the Convention on Biological Diversity that sets out a definition and criteria for identifying OECMs.

== Personal life ==
MacKinnon had three sons. She died on 18 March 2023.

== Publications ==
MacKinnon was the author or co-author of over 100 scientific publications, books and best practice guidelines. These included:

- IUCN/WCPA (2018). Draft Guidelines for Recognising and Reporting Other Effective Area-based Conservation Measures. January 2018. IUCN
- Woodley, S., MacKinnon, K., McCanny, S., Pither, R., Prior, K., Salafsky, N. and D. Lindenmayer. (2015) Managing protected areas for biological diversity and ecosystem functions, in G. L. Worboys, M. Lockwood, A. Kothari, S. Feary and I. Pulsford (eds) Protected Area Governance and Management, pp. 651–684, Australia National University Press, Canberra.
- Davies, J., Poulsen, L., Schulte-Herbrüggen, B. Mackinnon, K., Crawhall, N., Henwood, W.D., Dudley, N., Smith, J. and M. Gudka. (2012). Conserving Dryland Biodiversity. IUCN and UNCCD.
- Mackinnon, K., Dudley, N. and T. Sandwith. (2011). Natural solutions: Protected areas helping people to cope with climate change. Oryx 45 (4) 461–462.
- Kathy MacKinnon, Gusti Hatta, Hakimah Halim and Arthur Mangalik (1997) The Ecology of Kalimantan - The Ecology of Indonesia Series III. Oxford University Press, pp 832 ISBN 9780945971733
- Kathy MacKinnon (1992) The wildlife of Indonesia: Nature's treasure house Gramedia Pustaka Utama, pp 292 ISBN 9795110594
- John MacKinnon and Kathy MacKinnon (1986) Review of the Protected Areas System in the Afrotropical Realm International Union for Conservation of Nature and Natural Resources pp 284 ISBN 978-2880326098

== Honours and awards ==
In 2007 she was awarded the Distinguished Service Award of the Society of Conservation Biology. In 2018, she was awarded the Midori Prize for Biodiversity for individuals who have made outstanding contributions to the conservation and sustainable use of biodiversity at global, regional or local levels.
