= Coastal Reserve (Ukraine) =

Former bird sanctuary in Ukraine

The Coastal Reserve was a former conservation area in Ukraine that was under protection from 1930 to 1933. It was primarily a bird sanctuary and officially became part of the Askania-Nova reserve in 1933.

== History of creation ==
H. A. Bryzhalin proposed the idea of creating bird sanctuaries in Ukraine in 1919, along the shores of the Black Sea and the Azov Sea. Bryzhalin was inspired by examples of similar American bird sanctuaries and reserve areas.

On July 14, 1927, the Soviet resolution Narodnykh kommisarov, or SNK USSR No. 172, was adopted to "protect the natural environment of the Black Sea and the Azov Sea", including the "defense of birds" from predators during flight and nesting. The reserve area included Churyuk Island in the Syvash, Dzharylhach Island in the Black Sea, Solonoozerna dacha, and the Kinburnsʹka, Kryva, Bilosaraysʹka and Obitochna Spits. The total area of the reserves covered 32,000 hectares of coastal ecosystems along the coastline of the Black Sea and The Sea of Azov. The term "Azov Reserve", though technically incorrect, is sometimes used as an alternative to "Coastal Reserve".

Notable leaders of the 1920s environmental movement who took part in coastal reserve creation include I.Kurylo-Krimchak, director of the Melitopol Museum of Local Lore; Ye.Lavrenko, Kharkiv Regional Inspector of Natural Monument Protection; and A. Brauner.

By 1927, the creation of coastal reserve areas was considered the best way to protect natural monuments. Many articles about reserve areas were published and many research expeditions were organized.

In the 1920s and 1930s, some parts of the reserve area were classified as independent reserves. These included the Obitochna Spit Reserve, Dzharylhach Reserve, and Churyuk Island Reserve. The Ukrainian Committee for Natural Monuments Protection (UCNMP) aimed to create reserve administrations and special departments for protection. Their attempts were unsuccessful. In 1928, state gravel reserve areas were established, covering a number of individual sandy areas in the lower Dnieper Valley, and in 1929, Coastal Reserve areas were discussed at gatherings of UCNMP. However, no reserve administrations were established, so by 1932, independent coastal reserves were incorporated into the Askania-Nova reserve. From January 1, 1933, Askania-Nova was divided into two regions, each an independent institution. These were the Black Sea State Reserve and the Azov-Syvash State Reserve, today known as the Black Sea Biosphere Reserve and the Azov Syvash National Nature Park.

== History of research ==
In 1928, a detailed description of individual parts of coastal reserves was released to the public in "Protect Natural Sites in Ukraine," a book issued by UCNMP.

In 1927, on behalf of the Ukrainian Academy of Sciences, M. Sharleman led an expedition to study newly created coastal reserves. A freelance researcher from the Zoological Museum of the Ukrainian Academy of Sciences, A. K. Shepe, participated in the first excursion, which was held between June 10 and 23, 1927. The second excursion, which was held between September 3 and 14, brought on board A. K. Shepe, O. YU. Borzakovskyy, and research workers from the Chapli Reserve who had attended the previous excursion. They were the head of department of the Scientific Zoological Station, O.O. Schumer, and an entomologist, S.I. Medvedev.

In his report of the expedition, Sharleman noted the urgent need to strengthen reserve protection and educate nearby villages about environmental protection. He also acknowledged the need for a more detailed study of coastal reserves and the need for permanent research stations in reserve areas. In 1928, all territory in the coastal reserves areas was intensively studied by the Odessa Regional Inspector for the Protection of Nature, V.H. Averin, and ornithologists S.I Snihirevskyy and L.A. Portenko.

In 1932, describing the value of state coastal reserves, Sharleman noted: “The great flyways of the birds of our union are near the seaside and the islands. The protection of health-arterial routes influences greatly on the number of birds in most parts of the union.” This prompted the construction of ornithological stations for studying bird migration in the coastal reserves.

== General references ==
1. Lavrenko E., Зоз І. The vegetation of Michael stud (col. Of Kapnist) Sumy provinces // Protection of natural monuments of Ukraine. Digest 2.- 1928, p. 23–37.
2. Scientific Chronicle // Journal of Natural Sciences, No.3–4, 1927, – p. 208
3. Sharleman M. Something about coastal reserve areas/ Bulletin of science. — 1931. — No. :1/2. — p. 65–66.
4. Sharleman M. Something about coastal reserve areas // Ukr. Hund. And Fish.- 1929 – No.2–3 – p. 9-11
5. Sharleman M. Materials on ornithofauna of Dzharylhach island in the Black Sea (with O. Shumer) // Digest of studies of Zoological museum – 1930 -No.8 – p. 99–117
