= Charles William Tyrrell =

British accountant involved in establishing the Booker Prize

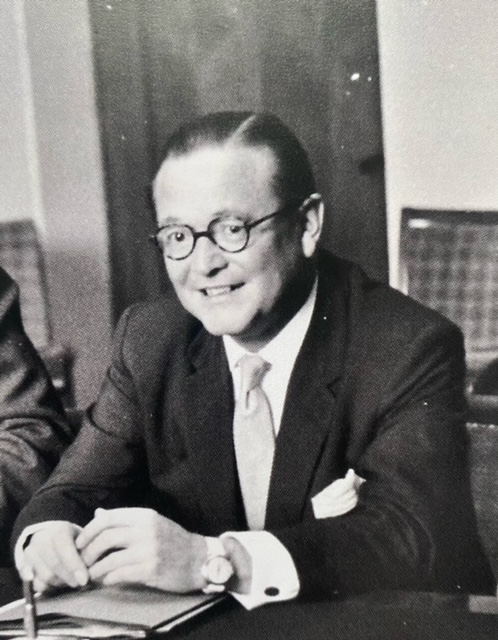
- Born: 16 May 1910; Virginia Water, England
- Died: January 7, 1972 (aged 61); England
- Education: Stowe School
- Occupation: Chartered accountant
- Employer: Booker Group
- Known for: Booker Prize founder
- Relatives: Harry Jonas (grandson)

Charles William Tyrrell (16 May 1910 – 7 January 1972) was a British chartered accountant who was instrumental in establishing the Booker Prize.

== Personal life ==
Charles William Tyrrell was born in Virginia Water, Surrey, England, the third of four children to Charles Ethelbert (Charlie) Tyrrell and Emily Jane Tyrrell (née Hacking). He studied at Stowe School in Buckinghamshire, England. Tyrrell was first married to Catherine Ivy Francis (née Wentworth). In September 1949, he married Joan Hayman Tyrrell (née Hooper) and they had three daughters, Emma, Sally and Beverly. A grandson, Harry Jonas, is an international lawyer and social entrepreneur.

== Booker Prize ==
Tyrrell trained at Broads Paterson & Co. in London and later worked with Arthur Young & Co. in New York (now both merged to become Ernst & Young). He joined the Booker Group (formerly Booker-McConnell) and became the first Chairman of the Author's Division, acquiring rights to Ian Fleming and Agatha Christie’s works, among others. On 6 May 1968, Tom Maschler, of Jonathan Cape and Publishers’ Association, wrote to Tyrrell to suggest instituting “a major literary award” and requested finance from Booker-McConnell. A decision to proceed with the establishment of a prize was communicated to Maschler by Tyrrell in person at the offices of Jonathan Cape on 8 May 1968. On 15 May 1968, Tyrrell wrote to Maschler to express that he was confident that the terms of the award could be “agreed with speed and sweet reason”. In 1969, P. H. Newby became the first winner of the Booker Prize (then known as the Booker-McConnell Prize).
