= Natural Justice: Lawyers for Communities and the Environment =

- Founded: 2007
- Founder: Harry Jonas and Sanjay Kabir Bavikatte
- Type: Nonprofit organization
- Headquarters: Cape Town, South Africa

A Samburu pastoralist herding his flock of sheep in northwest Kenya. Natural Justice worked with the Samburu community to develop a bio-cultural community protocol to help address concerns about their indigenous livestock breeds.

Natural Justice: Lawyers for Communities and the Environment is a non-profit organisation based in Cape Town, South Africa, with additional offices in Nairobi, Kenya, and Dakar, Senegal. It takes its name from the legal principle of natural justice and it works at the local level to legally empower communities to pursue social and environmental justice. It also works at the national and international levels to promote the full and effective implementation of environmental laws and policies such as the Convention on Biological Diversity.

Natural Justice was founded by Harry Jonas and Sanjay Kabir Bavikatte

in 2007. Natural Justice has been developing a process and tool known as community protocols in order to enable communities to understand the laws and policies that affect them, particularly those developed by government and industry without consultation. Protocols help communities illustrate their biological, cultural and spiritual resources, norms and values and assert their existing rights under local customary, domestic and international laws. Such protocols have been developed with several indigenous and local communities in Africa and Asia in order to ensure the continued practice of their customary ways of life that contribute to the conservation and sustainable use of biodiversity, in line with the United Nations Convention on Biological Diversity.

Community protocols are gaining recognition in international negotiations on access and benefit-sharing of genetic resources and reducing emissions from deforestation and forest degradation (REDD), endogenous development practices, and traditional health care.

== See also ==
- South African environmental law
