= Indigenous and community conserved area =

Spaces de facto governed by Indigenous peoples or local communities

ICCAs are territories and areas conserved by Indigenous Peoples and local communities, i.e., natural spaces de facto governed by Indigenous peoples or local communities with evidently positive outcomes for the conservation of biological and cultural diversity. ICCA is an abbreviation for "territories and areas governed, managed and conserved by Indigenous Peoples and local communities". Since about 2020, a term commonly used intercheangebly with ICCAs is 'territories of life'. In ICCAs, the continuation, revival, or modification of traditional practices (some of which are of ancient origin) and/or new initiatives succeed in protecting and restoring natural resources and cultural values in the face of new threats or opportunities. Some ICCAs are situated in remote ecosystems that have had minimum human influence, while others encompass areas of various regulations and magnitudes within regions strongly affected or modified by human occupation. ICCAs may or may not fit the IUCN definition of “protected area” but, when they do, they can fall into any IUCN protected area categories.

The following three characteristics are used to identify an ICCA:

- A strong relationship exists between an Indigenous people or local community and a specific site (territory, ecosystem, species habitat). This relationship is often embedded in the people's or community's sense of identity and/or dependence for livelihood and well-being.
- The Indigenous people or local community is the major player in decision-making and implementation regarding the management of the site, implying that a local institution has the capacity to develop and enforce decisions (other stakeholders may collaborate as partners, especially when the land is owned by the state, but de facto decisions and management efforts are predominantly taken by the concerned people or community).
- The people's or community's management decisions and efforts lead to the conservation of habitats, species, genetic diversity, ecological functions/ benefits, and associated cultural values, even when the conscious objective of management is not conservation (i.e., it may be livelihoods, security, safeguarding cultural and spiritual values, etc.).

== Definition ==
The IUCN World Parks Congress of 2003 defined ICCAs as:

natural and/or modified ecosystems containing significant biodiversity values and ecological services, voluntarily conserved by (sedentary and mobile) indigenous and local communities, through customary laws or other effective means.

At the 4th World Conservation Congress, indigenous peoples and local communities and supporting NGOs formed the ICCA Consortium, an association that continues to support the global movement for Indigenous Peoples' and local communities' collective territories of life.

This definition is recognised by the United Nations Environment Programme World Conservation Monitoring Centre (UNEP-WCMC) who manage the ICCA Registry, a database dedicated to promoting ICCAs and their custodians conservation practices. The data in the ICCA Registry is voluntarily provided by ICCA custodians, or through their supporting organisations. It is not yet comprehensive but continues to grow each year, providing a much-needed evidence base to promote the recognition and support of ICCAs worldwide.

The ICCA Consortium and UNEP-WCMC are working as part of a broader global effort to highlight the vital contributions that Indigenous Peoples and local communities have made to conservation throughout history and continue to make today.

== Dynamics ==
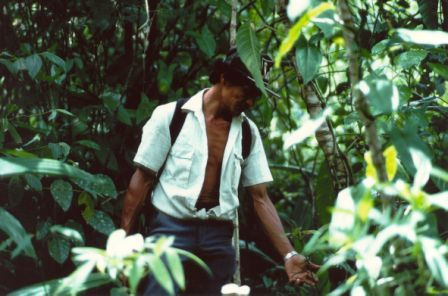
A village association runs an ICCA-based sustainable use enterprise in Costa Rica.

A crucial feature of ICCAs is their diversity. The conservation practices of indigenous peoples and local communities depend on an astonishing variety of meanings and values underpinned by the relationship between humans and the natural environment, and find their expression in different ICCAs all over the world. While all ICCAs by definition embody precious bio-cultural diversity in a voluntary and self-organised way, the related beliefs, practices, and institutions are all context-specific. Moreover, as lively sociocultural phenomena, ICCAs change in correspondence with history and society. Some disappear, others survive in old or new forms, and some will emerge anew. Most systems by which contemporary indigenous peoples and local communities govern and manage their natural resources are a blending of old and new knowledge, practices, tools and values of different origin.

In the struggle to cope with the scale and pace of sociocultural change, some ICCA institutions have been replaced by state governance or are under threat of being so. Similarly in some cases, change has been powerful enough to affect the community's capacity to manage the local resources in a sustainable way and genuine local ICCAs are just a memory or very much struggling to remain effective. Yet in others, even powerful change has been unable to destroy them: more complex ICCAs, capable of taking advantage of new conditions and establishing new alliances have emerged from the pre-existing ones.

Over the last two centuries, the formal policies and practices that dominate conservation and development have largely ignored ICCAs or actively threatened them. Even today, while neglect and harm give way to emerging recognition and support, the interface between state-based institutions and the customary institutions of indigenous peoples and local communities remains riddled with conflicts. Some relationships are respectful, but many are affected by misunderstandings and mistrust, which may threaten the success of well-intentioned initiatives. In fact, despite the current serious interest on individual ICCAs and community conservation in general, two opposing stereotypes continue to plague conservation: the romantic view of indigenous peoples and traditional communities being in total harmony with nature; and the view of people as "parasites", necessarily degrading the ecosystems in which they live.

== Threats ==
Despite increasing recognition of ICCAs in international conservation policies, there is still great neglect in terms of their effective and appropriate recognition in national policies and practices. When they have no legal recognition within a country, they may also not be recognised or respected by private entities and neighbouring communities. In such cases, ICCAs are vulnerable through land and water being appropriated or "reallocated" for an alternative use. To non-members of the relevant communities, many ICCAs appear as natural, "unmanaged" and "unutilised" ecosystems — all the more coveted for resource extraction. ICCAs may also suffer as a result of changing value systems, increased pressure on natural resources and other internal tensions. In general, ICCAs are exposed to both external and internal threats. A few examples are reported below:

External

- Imposed development and resource exploitation processes, such as mining and fossil fuel extraction (particularly important as even if indigenous peoples and local communities possess land rights, government usually reserve for themselves the use of sub-soil resources), logging, tree plantation, industrial fishing, sea dredging, land conversion to large-scale grazing or agriculture (including agrofuel plantations), water diversions and drainage works, urbanisation and major infrastructure (roads, ports, airports, tourism);
- Expropriation of community land through nationalisation, privatisation, and conservation initiatives, particularly the creation of state-governed protected areas;
- War, violent conflicts or movements of refugees;
- Territorial encroachment by or conflicts with other communities and municipalities;
- Inappropriate forms of recognition, such as that which imposes top-down institutional arrangements and thereby devalues and de-motivates traditional governance institutions;
- Imposition of unaffordable taxes and other fiscal burdens;
- Active acculturation of communities i.e.education programmes disrespectful of local cultures, livelihoods and values, or evangelisation programmes of different faiths;
- Divisions and conflicts fuelled by party politics (often actively promoted from outside) or by sudden influx of funds strengthening or creating local inequities;
- Poaching and unauthorised extraction of timber and plant resources;
- Air and water pollution through discharge of waste residuals (e.g. via acid rain, chemical pollution from upstream mining or run-off of chemical inputs from agriculture) and the spread of invasive or exotic species;
- Extreme natural events and catastrophes, including droughts, floods, forest fires, hurricanes, earthquakes and tsunamis, some of which are related to human transformation of the landscape, waterways and climate.

Internal

- Changing values, acculturation and integration into dominant society, leading to commoditisation of nature and culture and, ultimately, the loss of traditional knowledge, locally adapted management practices and governance institutions — all with particular impact on the younger generations;
- Increasing pressure on resources — in particular those that lead to the substitution of local subsistence and solidarity economies with the market economy;
- Persistent or new inequalities between economic and social classes and gender groups within the community, leading to conflicts about management of natural resources and elite capture of conservation benefits;
- Depopulation through migration because of new economic opportunities, social conflicts and political pressures;
- Progressive loss of food sovereignty and traditional medical systems, weakening traditional communities because of poorer health and nutrition.

In practice, threats cannot necessarily be segregated into “external” and “internal” categories, as community members may be active participants in external processes, and exogenous forces may drive internal processes. For instance, a main driver of change that powerfully combines external and internal threats are new opportunities to access and use natural resources for profit-making activities. These may bring in welcome funds for a variety of development needs but can also be a door for corruption and mis-governance, ushering divisions, conflicts and social disruption. As the disparity of power in modern societies increases exponentially, many indigenous peoples and local communities, at the bottom of the ladder, have fewer and fewer chances to resist. In some countries they are even denied legal existence as “peoples” and “communities”, and denied the chance of owning or possessing land rights and natural resources collectively, one of the last barriers to individual weakness and greed. In theory, the recognition of the many values of ICCAs will help in the broader struggles for human rights and indigenous peoples’ rights, and contribute to foster more equitable and sustainable societies.

== Legislation ==
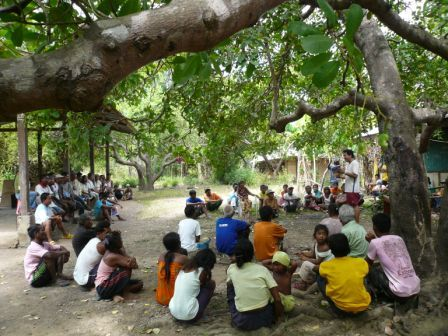
Discussing ICCA governance issues in Coron Island — one of the first ICCAs to be fully recognized as Ancestral Domain (Terrestrial and marine area), under the collective governance of its indigenous peoples (Tagbanwa) in Palawan (The Philippines)

It is said that ICCAs cover as much land as government protected areas (as well as existing for much longer), yet tens of thousands of sites are not yet recognised by governments and still face neglect within official conservation systems and government policies and legislation. A lack of political and legal support often hampers community efforts at maintaining ICCAs through traditional means.

While the “legitimacy” of ICCAs is rooted in the values and meanings they possess for the most directly concerned peoples and communities, their “legality” and their broad recognition and support by society at large are rooted in a process that takes strength from international conventions and agreements. This process originated relatively recently. At the Vth World Parks Congress (Durban, 2003) conservation professionals systematized for the first time the concept of “governance of protected areas” and clarified that indigenous peoples and local communities – a crucial actor in conservation – should be fully recognized in their governance role. At the same Congress a breakthrough was made by indigenous peoples – and mobile indigenous peoples in particular – effectively arguing that the respect of their rights would actually advance, rather than diminish, conservation outcomes. Shortly after the Durban Congress, the Convention on Biological Diversity, at its COP 7 meeting in Kuala Lumpur (2004), approved the CBD Programme of Work on Protected Areas (PoWPA). PoWPA supports a “new approach” to protected areas, calling for attention to governance types and quality, equity in conservation, and indigenous peoples’ rights.

Numerous IUCN Resolutions attest to the will of IUCN members to recognize and support ICCAs were approved at the Barcelona World Conservation Congress of 2008, and IUCN publications were developed to back this up technically. WCC4 in Barcelona also approved new IUCN technical guidelines for protected areas, explicitly stating that different governance types – including ICCAs – can fully contribute to developing national protected area systems.

CBD COP 8 and CBD COP 9 reviewed the implementation of PoWPA and stressed the need to engage more forcefully in the element dedicated to 'Governance, Participation, Equity and Benefit Sharing'. This was also reflected in the statement of recommendations that the May 2010 meeting of CBD SBSTTA in Nairobi submitted to COP 10 (Nagoya, October 2010). Noticeably, CBD SBSTTA delegates made specific recommendations about ICCA recognition, clarifying, for instance, that "mechanisms for recognition should respect the customary governance systems that have maintained ICCAs over time".

At CBD COP 10 in Nagoya (2010), decision X/31 stressed again the role of indigenous (peoples) and community conserved (territories and) areas and invited Parties to recognise their organisations and contributions. COP 10 also agreed on a number of biodiversity targets for 2020. CBD Aichi Target 11 foresees that: “By 2020 at least 17 per cent of terrestrial and inland water, and 10 per cent of coastal and marine areas, especially areas of particular importance for biodiversity and ecosystem services, are conserved through effectively and equitably managed, ecologically representative and well connected systems of protected areas and other effective area-based conservation measures, and integrated into the wider landscapes and seascapes.” ICCAs clearly have a role to fulfil Aichi Target 11 as both protected areas and as “other effective area-based conservation measures”.

== See also ==
- Community-based conservation
- Conservation refugee
- Lands inhabited by indigenous peoples
- List of types of formally designated forests
- World Heritage Sites
