= ENGO =

An ENGO (environmental non-governmental organization) is a non-governmental organization (NGO) in the field of environmentalism. These organizations operate both locally and internationally which makes them play an important role in dealing with different kinds of environmental issues that are happening in the contemporary world. One of the most distinguishable things between environmental NGOs and environmental movements is that environmental NGOs have constitutions that state the rules of how power gets distributed among the people who are part of them.

From the emergence of environmental NGOs in the 1970s and 1980s, back when people only started to acknowledge the seriousness of environmental issues, many developments have been made towards helping the planet and its inhabitants. Some notable examples of these contributors are WWF, Greenpeace, Conservation International, The Nature Conservancy, Friends of the Earth, Himalayan Wildlife Foundation, the Environmental Investigation Agency and the David Suzuki Foundation.

== Classification and goals ==
To evaluate the classification of environmental NGOs, it is important to consider these five factors:

- geopolitical origins (location),
- political ideology (left / right / neither support),
- size (quantity),
- level of political focus (local / regional / international / global),
- funding sources (income).

Main goals of environmental NGOs include but are not limited to:

- creating relationships with the government and other organizations,
- offering training and assistance in agricultural conservation to maximize the use of local resources,
- establishing environmental solutions, and managing projects implemented to address issues affecting a particular area.

To fully understand the social, economic, and environmental effects that the organization can have on a region, it is also important to note that the organization can act outside the formal processes what state governments and other government institutions must comply with.

== Funding ==
Environmental NGOs are organizations that are not run by federal or state governments, therefore they receive funds from private donors, corporations, and other institutions. With political backup, environmental NGOs also receive considerable amounts of assets and resources through government sponsors such as the United Nations Environment Programme (UNEP) and the Commission on Sustainable Development (CSD) who supersede environmental policies. The funds issued by various parties inevitably influence the way their efforts will be put out, the different kinds of environmental policy-making, and the activities pursued to challenge and put pressure on the states to cooperate in environmental protection. It is clear that private and non-private funding influences and affects the way environmental NGOs view and report environmental conditions.

== Approaches ==
The concept of local is also crucial to the kinds of efforts and objectives which environmental NGOs will carry out. This aim is going to aid how environmental NGOs will "facilitate, fund, promote, and provide planning and organizational assistance to so-called grassroots organizations". Their efforts come in many forms such as: launching campaigns against nuclear weapons testing, protesting whale hunting, and "international campaigns against the degradation of environmental goods caused by practices like "clearing of timber, and criticize states for their ineffective policies or transnational corporations for environmentally damaging production".

== Challenges ==
By the 1980s, most of Zimbabwe's best land had been taken control of by European settlers which have been divided into categories of "(1) large-scale commercial farmland. (2) resettlement areas, (3) communal lands, (4) national parks and safari areas, (5) forest lands, and (6) urban land" which (with the exception of communal land) is owned and operated by the state. Environmental problems there are defined as "a change in the physical environment brought about by human interferences which are perceived by people to be unacceptable with respect to a particular set of commonly shared norms".

As of 2016, ENGOs had not yet widely adapted digital media in advanced or transformative ways. Digital tools have the potential to empower ENGOs by expanding information flows to government and policy makers. Nulman et al. have identified five key ways that ENGOs can or are using digital technologies: direct communication, information broadcast, media attention, call to action, and reinforcement. However it is difficult for ENGOs to fully benefit from digital technologies mainly due to a lack of resources and funding; this is exacberated by the remoteness of areas where ENGOs operate, where access to the internet is limited or non-existent.

== See also ==
- List of environmental organizations
- Conservation refugee
