= Conservation refugee =

Person displaced from native land when a conservation area is created

Conservation refugees are people (usually indigenous) who are displaced from their native lands when conservation areas, such as parks and other protected areas, are created.

== Definition ==
Many conservation refugees (such as the Great Lakes Twa) were already marginalized before a nature preserve was established on their territory, and are culturally dislocated and often living on the margins of urban areas or new settlements with few social or economic opportunities. Facing powerful state and international conservation interests, they rarely have legal recourse. Many conservation refugees are housed in refugee camps.

=== Role of ENGOs ===
ENGOs (environmental non-governmental organizations) are funded by a variety of sources. Private foundations, such as the Ford and MacArthur Foundations, once provided the bulk of the funds supporting NGO conservation efforts. Funds from bilateral and multilateral sources (such as USAID and the World Bank) and corporations also support ENGOs. An increase in corporate sponsorship raises the possibility of a conflict of interest between ENGOs and the corporations which support them, leading to ethical negligence.

Although the websites of the World Wildlife Fund, The Nature Conservancy and Conservation International say that the groups participate with local communities, the universally-applied model of conservation (based on Western science) often clashes with traditional knowledge of the environment. The Western conservation movement may be dismissive of indigenous conservation models because they are not based on Western science, but indigenous knowledge is the result of generations of interaction with their environment. In his Orion magazine article "Conservation Refugees", Mark Dowie writes:

John Muir, a forefather of the American conservation movement, argued that 'wilderness' should be cleared of all inhabitants and set aside to satisfy the urbane human's need for recreation and spiritual renewal. It was a sentiment that became national policy with the passage of the 1964 Wilderness Act, which defined wilderness as a place 'where man himself is a visitor who does not remain.' One should not be surprised to find hardy residues of these sentiments among traditional conservation groups. The preference for 'virgin' wilderness has lingered on in a movement that has tended to value all nature but human nature, and refused to recognize the positive wildness in human beings.

Dowie's article assesses the globalization of conservation. With the removal of indigenous communities from protected land, a symbiosis between indigenous peoples and their environment is disrupted; this may have the unintended consequence of decreasing biodiversity, as those who formerly lived off the land are now prohibited from interacting with it. As a result of their expulsion, they are poor additions to the over-populated areas surrounding the park (Igoe 2005). Poaching may increase, and the soil may become degraded as refugees take up subsistence agriculture. By ignoring the human factor, the conservation model followed by large ENGOs can be ineffective and counterproductive.

=== Preserving habitats or cultures ===
In the spring of 2003, India's Adivasi were pushed out of their farmlands and relocated to crowded villages to import six Asiatic lions. Although NGOs such as the World Wildlife Fund try to conserve land and animal species while training indigenous peoples for alternate work, indigenous peoples are often removed from their land and placed in communities or villages which leave them vulnerable to poverty and starvation. Not compensated for what was lost, they have difficulty adjusting to their new lifestyle. The issue of conservation refugees across India are well reported

Christine MacDonald's Green, Inc. quotes a tribal leader that "white men" told them to leave their homes in the forest because the land was not protected; they were forced into another village (which was already occupied by another group) outside the forest, and had "no choice, because they told them that they [would] be beaten and killed". Left without food and land, they were forced to work on farms established by the villagers before them.

=== Eliminating culture and behavior ===
Indigenous peoples who are forced from their land lose the portions of their culture which are embedded in resources. According to Darrell A. Posey, indigenous knowledge could significantly contribute to conservation: "What looked natural might be cultural, and thus that indigenous people should be seen as models for conservation, rather than as opposed to it and thus denied land rights".

Many residents of what have become conservation sites or national parks have cultural rituals and practices which are adapted to their local environment. Through these practices, they have been able to survive and develop a culture. Mark Dowie's Conservation Refugees describes Africa's Batwa Pygmies. After living in conservation camps under restrictions limiting centuries-old cultural practices, community member Kwokwo Barume observed that "we are heading toward extinction". The restrictions include bans on cultivation, hunting or gathering, and sacred sites and burial grounds are off-limits; all are essential to the people's daily life. Limitations such as these help lead toward the extinction of hunter-gatherer groups around the world to make way for government-sanctioned game reserves and ecotourism.

=== Redefining conservation ===
Posey was an anthropologist and ethnobiologist whose writings about the Kayapo people of the Amazon rainforest influenced environmental policy; traditional societies are now viewed as helpers in conservation, and steps are being taken to aid the reconstruction of these societies (Dove & Carpenter 2008:5). Posey reiterated that indigenous people were the only ones who truly knew the forests, because they inhabited them for centuries. He also determined that biodiversity was important for indigenous peoples' lives through gardens, openings into the forest and rock outcrops; what is considered natural today may have been altered by the ancestors of the indigenous peoples, rather than naturally occurring as previously thought. Posey's work is helping to redefine conservation and what it means to societies living in conservation areas.

South American countries connect indigenous groups willing to practice conservation with technical resources from conservation groups. Instead of being expelled from their land, the Federal Environmental Conservation Act that protects their rights to remain on the land and use its natural resources; the "commonwealth minister negotiates conservation agreements with them".

=== Indigenous peoples ===
The World Council of Indigenous Peoples (WCIP) held its first conference in British Columbia in 1975. It was founded by Chief George Manuel of the Shuswap Nation, who found after traveling the world that the same suffering and mistreatment felt by the North American Indians were also felt by many other indigenous peoples. Some indigenous peoples began to speak up at conservation meetings which affected them. According to Mark Dowie, "'We are enemies of conservation,' declared Maasai leader Martin Saning’o, standing before a session of the November 2004 World Conservation Congress sponsored by IUCN in Bangkok, Thailand. The nomadic Maasai, who have over the past thirty years lost most of their grazing range to conservation projects throughout eastern Africa, hadn’t always felt that way. In fact, Saning’o reminded his audience, '…we were the original conservationists.'"

Dowie also writes that Sayyaad Saltani, the elected chair of the Council of Elders of the Qashqai Confederation in Iran, gave a speech to the World Parks Congress in Durban, South Africa, in October 2003. Saltani discussed the relentless pressures on his nomadic pastoral people, how their pastures and natural resources were seized by a number of agencies, and the interruption of their migratory path: "Their summer and winter pastures were consistently degraded and fragmented by outsiders, and not even their social identity was left alone".

Violence and retaliation have followed park creation due to resentment of land restriction and displacement or blocked access to resources, causing shortages. In Nepal, when the Sagarmatha National Park was founded, the Sherpa intentionally accelerated forest depletion because their rights and traditional practices had been taken away: "Local elders estimated that more forest was lost in the first four years after the park's creation than in the previous two decades". Several instances of violence have occurred in India following park creations. India has nearly five hundred protected areas, rich in resources and primarily surrounded by agricultural land and poor villages: "Inevitably they invade the reserves and come into conflict with authorities. Resentment at the wildlife authorities attempts to control the situation has exploded in violence against officials and guards". In the Naganhde National Park in South India, wildlife guards allegedly killed a poacher; the local people retaliating by burning 20 square kilometres (7.7 sq mi) of forest: "In India, resentment by local people to National Parks legislation and enforcement agencies has caused increasing problems".

== Africa ==
African conservation refugees (about 14 million, according to some sources) have long been displaced due to transnational efforts to preserve select biomes believed to be historically and environmentally crucial. The article "Parks and Peoples: the social impact of protected areas" reported that a protected area is a way of "seeing, understanding, and reproducing the world around us" and a place of social interaction and production. Protected areas are established to preserve an area in its natural state in an increasingly-globalized world. Although the residential grounds of millions of native people have existed for hundreds of years, conservation efforts encroach on these areas to preserve the biological diversity of flora and fauna.

Wildlife, plants and other resources are protected, and native people are expelled beyond the border of the new preserved area (PA) so they do not affect the ecological preservation. Displacement and the lack of rights of displaced peoples is a main concern of environmental conservation; displaced peoples may encounter social problems (such as nationalism) in their new locations. These refugees often become a socially-isolated underclass. Another effect of displacement is the loss of jobs, hunting grounds, personal resources and freedom. The treatment of these peoples may trigger war (among themselves or with opposing groups), disease and malnutrition.

Long-term effects of the displacement persist in conservation refugees, their families and subsequent generations, reshaping the cultural and economic dynamics of a society with a ripple effect. Resources are directly linked to conflicts, in Africa as elsewhere; according to Abiodun Alao, author of Natural Resources and Conflict in Africa, natural resources can be linked to conflict in three different ways: a direct (or remote) conflict is caused by the resource, a natural resource can fuel (or sustain conflicts), and resources have been used to resolve conflicts. Conservation efforts which appropriate an indigenous people's land remove them from a familiar social environment to unknown quarters and customs; traditional values, such as "songs, rituals, ... and stories" may be entirely lost in a little over a generation. Relocation may be economically devastating on an individual and group level. Indigenous peoples are forced to the boundaries of the new parks, stripped of their homes and status, and sometimes made to live in "shabby squatter camps ... without running water or sanitation".

To protect the rights of indigenous people and others displaced as conservation refugees, the Fifth World Parks Congress held a session to discuss the problem. The session acknowledged the connection between poverty and displacement, altering land rights and their hazardous effects on culture and future generations. Its Durban Action Plan will insure that local people are compensated financially before an area is acquired for conservation.

=== East Africa ===
East Africa is home to tribes, such as the Maasai, whose livelihood and culture revolve around cattle. The Maasai are pastoralists, whose "livestock follow a seasonal settlement in the dry season and disperse into temporary camps in the wet season". They once occupied most of the Serengeti-Ngorongoro region; recent archaeological research concluded that pastoralists occupied the region for at least 2,500 years, and the Maasai occupied the area since the mid-nineteenth century. Although the Serengeti-Ngorongoro region was allocated for a proposed national park in 1940, the pastoralists were allowed to remain. Ten years later, conflict erupted among the pastoralists, farmers and park authorities who divided the park into the Serengeti National Park and the Ngorongoro Conservation Area (NCA). The division evicted the Maasai pastoralists from the national park, but allowed them to remain in restricted areas of the NCA. This affected the Maasai lifestyle and the environment. During the wet season, the Maasai had herded their cattle to the Serengeti for grazing; after the parks' division, they could only graze in the NCA. The Maasai's seasonal migrations from the Serengeti and the Ngorongoro helped prevent over-grazing; with the new restrictions, over-grazing could result in the starvation of their cattle and the depletion of environmental resources.

Another problem for the Maasai was the rapid population increase of the wildebeest. Wildebeest calves are unaffected hosts of bovine malignant catarrhal fever, a viral infection which can kill Maasai livestock exposed to areas grazed by the calves. In addition to disease, the large wildebeest population devoured the grasses which had been grazed by Maasai livestock. During the early 1970s, cultivation was banned in the NCA. The Maasai also depend on grain cultivation, trading livestock for grain. For twenty years, they experienced a ban on cultivation, restrictions on Crater Highlands region and the spread of livestock disease. Because of the inability to cultivate, there was an increase in malnutrition increased in Maasai children. The cultivation ban was lifted during the early 1990s, improving Maasai living standards; malnutrition declined, and sustainable living returned. Since intense cultivation is required to support the population, however, conservationists are reconsidering a cultivation ban.

In 1988, Tanzania's Department of Wildlife evicted thousands of people from the Mkomazi Game Reserve. The result of the evictions and restrictions to land use, according to Mark Dowie, "is a gradual community and cultural meltdown." Neighboring communities have become violent as the result of tension between indigenous people and the parks. Due to overgrazing and restrictions on land use, many pastoralists "were forced to reduce or completely sell off their herds and learn to cultivate grains and legumes on small plots of arid land. Some turned to poaching for a living, others prostitution ... young men who sold their herds turned to profligate lives, and when their money ran out they became low-wage farm workers and small-time hustlers. Young women facing a shrinking pool of potential husbands sell community essentials such as charcoal, traditional medicines, milk from borrowed goats, or, saddest of all, themselves". Because of the decline in resources and their displacement to non-arable lands, many pastoralists have resorted to bushmeat for subsistence and trade; this threatens the already-declining population of apes, and facilitates the spread of HIV and Ebola virus disease.

The Ogiek tribes of the Mau Forest are also the targets of land restrictions and evacuation from their native lands. The Ogiek have been described as a peaceful people who primarily cultivate honey bees, but will grow beans and potatoes if needed. They subsist only on animals who are abundant in the forest; when the tribe notices a decline in population of a particular animal due to hunting, the Ogiek will raise sheep and goats for food. Animals are killed for their use only, and the Ogiek are not part of the bushmeat market. They are considered "the best imaginable conservators of land".

The first attempt to displace the Ogiek people occurred during the 20th century, when British settlers attempted to clear the forest for tea plantations. With the Forest Act of 1957 and the Wildlife Conservation Act of 1977, successive governments have displaced the Ogiek for forest conservation; they were often moved to non-arable land which was useless to their customary lifestyle of bee production and hunting. This displacement made many Ogiek homeless, poor and ill; their life expectancy declined from sixty to forty-six years. Although the High Court of Tanzania halted the evictions in June 2005, its ruling was appealed five months later. The appeal argued that the Ogiek were unfit to inhabit the Mau Forest, ignoring the forest's illegal, massive logging operations. Ecologists and hydrologists now agree with the Ogiek that Kenya's forests (which are beginning to decline) are the main suppliers of water for the nation and, if not preserved, will result is mass starvation.

=== West Africa ===
In Guinea, deforestation has become the environmental norm. Since records began to be kept, only 1.8 percent of the country's tropical moist forest remains. To preserve the remaining forested land, conservationists have protected three swaths of land with restrictions on hunting, farming, and residency. As a result, 663,000 people have been displaced from the protected areas. This trend is reflected in neighboring countries; Liberia claims over 120,000 conservation refugees, and Senegal has 65,000 people displaced from its nine protected areas. Ghana, to the east, has 35,000 refugees from the six percent of its remaining forests in nine protected areas (PAs).

In Guinea's Ziami Strict Nature Reserve (part of UNESCO's Man and the Biosphere Programme), sections of land in the southeastern panhandle have been cordoned off to preserve the growing forest and savanna which was the traditional home of the Toma people (Fairhead). Nineteenth-century anthropologist Benjamin Anderson and contemporary anthropology professors James Fairhead and Melissa Leach have observed that, based on Toma oral history, careful Toma cultivation of high-forest areas enabled the Ziami forest to flourish along with the remaining savanna.

=== Southern Africa ===
The San people (also known as the Bushmen), hunter-gatherers in Botswana's Kalahari Desert, have faced hardship and—in some cases—displacement. The San have no land claim, and the government views them as a nomadic people.

Before independence, Botswana was part of the British Empire. Although the colonial government did not view the San as property owners, it provided them with a 52,000-square-kilometre (20,000 sq mi) game reserve. As the San population grew, animal populations began to dwindle; this population decline and the desires to promote tourism and integrate the San into modern society led the government to consider moving them from the game reserve. The government of Botswana also tried limited, year-round game licenses for the San to promote conservation. The special game licenses did not replenish the dwindling animal populations; many officials believed that they were being abused, and the government began to restrict their distribution and again consider relocation.

During the 1960s, San groups were relocated twice with the creation of the Moremi Game Reserve. Although the relocation was not forced, the San felt that they were not fully informed of its implications. Relocation had profound effects on their lifestyle, reducing their access to the land. Forced to become wage-earners (often at one of the game reserves), they experienced social discrimination.

When groups of San agreed to relocation from the Central Kalahari Game Reserve (CKGR) during the 1990s, adaptation to a new lifestyle (which included land ownership) was difficult and a number of people returned to the game reserve. The San founded an NGO, the First People of the Kalahari (FPK), in 1992 to advocate for land rights, social acceptance and self-determination.

=== Role of BINGOs ===
BINGOs (big international non-governmental organizations) may be controversial due to their partnership "with multinational corporations—particularly in the businesses of gas and oil, pharmaceuticals, and mining—that are directly involved in pillaging and destroying forest areas owned by indigenous peoples." According to anthropologist Jim Igoe, "Ironically, there is growing evidence that national parks themselves are contributing to the very problems that advocates of community conservation are trying to solve... The loss of natural resources to indigenous resource management systems that these evictions entailed frequently forced local people to mine natural resources in the area to which they were restricted". Mac Chapin writes in the introduction to his article that funding for conservation efforts has retreated from the need to work with indigenous people and local communities, "with a new focus on large-scale conservation strategies and the importance of science, rather than social realities, in determining their agendas."

== See also ==
- Indigenous Protected Area
- Indigenous and community conserved area
- The Mountain People, a book by Colin Turnbull
- 30 by 30
