= Johnny Jonas =

British painter (born 1948)

- Born: 27 February 1948 (age 78)
- Occupation: Painter
- Website: johnnyjonas.com

John Harold Jonas (born 27 February 1948) is a British painter. Over his career he has portrayed the culture on the French Riviera, depicted British sporting and cultural life, and maintains a current focus on portraiture. His commissions include Queen Elizabeth The Queen Mother, Elizabeth II, David Cameron, Aga Khan IV, Sir Stirling Moss and Bear Grylls.

== Career ==
=== Training and early career (1972–1984) ===
After schooling at Charterhouse and working at Lloyd's of London, Johnny Jonas attended the Academy of Fine Arts of Florence (Accademia di Belle Arti di Firenze). In 1979, he moved with his family to Grimaldi, a frontier village near Ventimiglia on the Italian Riviera. By chance, Colin Colahan, a painter and sculptor, lived in the same area and provided mentorship. Jonas painted a wide range of subjects along the Italian-French-Monegasque coast for exhibition, particularly of street life, café culture and backstage scenes, including a series of orchestra rehearsals, circus, jazz and cabaret, including at the Opéra de Monte Carlo.

=== British cultural and sporting life (1985–1995) ===
During this period, his paintings provide "social commentary" on the complex and sometimes paradoxical relationships between major social and sporting events and the people who attend them, such as at Ascot, the Henley Royal Regatta, cricket and polo matches, on golf courses, bowls and croquet laws, tennis courts, and jousting at Hever Castle. His interest in vintage cars led to a number of paintings featuring classic British cars, such as 'From Rushhour with Love.' His images have been reproduced on over two million greetings cards and he was artist in residence at ING's headquarters in 2001.

=== Portraits (1996–present) ===
Johnny Jonas has painted portraits throughout his career, which he considers to be "visual biography," His commissions include: Queen Elizabeth The Queen Mother, Elizabeth II, David Cameron, Aga Khan IV, Vincent O'Brien, Baron Vincent of Coleshill, Lord Wakeham, Baron Walker of Gestingthorpe, Sir Stirling Moss, Sir Henry Cecil, Sir Richard Branson, Albert Roux, Baron Levene of Portsoken, Dick Francis, Brian Sewell, Lester Piggott, Martina Navratilova, Steffi Graf, Tony McCoy, Bear Grylls, Satish Kumar, and Alec Stewart, among others. The Isle of Man paid tribute to Queen Elizabeth the Queen Mother by featuring Jonas's portrait of her on a stamp.

Johnny Jonas has also commemorated the building of vessels, including the Virgin Atlantic Challenger II and the Astute-class submarine, as well as technological achievements such as the building of the Channel Tunnel.

== Personal life ==
Jonas has supported a number of charities though his art, including the Injured Jockeys Fund, Sir Peter O'Sullevan Charitable Trusts and has painted twenty winners of the Peter O'Sullevan Award.
