= Conservation areas of India =

Conservation Areas in India refer to well-demarcated large geographical entities with an established conservation plan, and were part of a joint Indo-US project on "landscape management and protection". The project ran from 1996 to 2002. These areas are home to many Conservation reliant species.

== Locations ==
Four Conservation Areas were selected for this project:

- Annamalai Conservation Area in Tamil Nadu
- Garo Hills Conservation Area in Meghalaya
- Satpura Conservation Area in Madhya Pradesh and Maharashtra
- Terai Conservation Area in Uttar Pradesh and Uttarakhand

== Participants ==
The participating entities in the project were:

- Ministry of Environment and Forests, Government of India
- Wildlife Institute of India
- United States Forest Service

== Goals ==
The primary goal was to develop experience in "landscape protection" - protection of large geographical entities as a whole, only parts of which may be under federal control and protection. Each of the conservation areas contained fully protected areas like national parks and wildlife sanctuaries, managed resources like reserved forests and communal forests, as well as privately held land. The size of the selected regions constituted more than one forest division, and in one case was spread over two states.
