= Protected area =

Areas protected for having ecological or cultural importance

World map with percentage of each country under protection (2005 data) 0–3.9% protected 3.9–11.3% protected 11.3–22.7% protected 22.7–41.8% protected 41.8–72.3% protected No data

Share of important terrestrial biodiversity areas under protection, as of 2018

Protected areas or conservation areas are locations that receive protection because of their recognized natural or cultural values. Protected areas are those areas in which human presence or the exploitation of natural resources (e.g. firewood, non-timber forest products, water, ...) is limited.

The term "protected area" also includes marine protected areas and transboundary protected areas across multiple borders. As of 2016, there are over 161,000 protected areas representing about 17 percent of the world's land surface area (excluding Antarctica).

For waters under national jurisdiction beyond inland waters, there are 14,688 Marine Protected Areas (MPAs), covering approximately 10.2% of coastal and marine areas and 4.12% of global ocean areas. In contrast, only 0.25% of the world's oceans beyond national jurisdiction are covered by MPAs.

In recent years, the 30 by 30 initiative has targeted to protect 30% of ocean territory and 30% of land territory worldwide by 2030; this has been adopted by the European Union in its Biodiversity Strategy for 2030, Campaign for Nature; which promoted the goal during the Convention on Biodiversity's COP15 Summit and the G7. In December 2022, Nations have reached an agreement with the Kunming-Montreal Global Biodiversity Framework at the COP15, which includes the 30 by 30 initiative.

Protected areas are often implemented for biodiversity conservation, providing habitat and protection from hunting for threatened and endangered species. Protection helps maintain ecological processes that cannot survive in most intensely managed landscapes and seascapes. Indigenous peoples and local communities frequently criticize this method of fortress conservation for the generally violent processes by which the regulations of the areas are enforced.

== IUCN definition ==
The definition that has been widely accepted across regional and global frameworks has been provided by the International Union for Conservation of Nature (IUCN) in its categorisation guidelines for protected areas. The definition is as follows:

A clearly defined geographical space, recognized, dedicated and managed, through legal or other effective means, to achieve the long-term conservation of nature with associated ecosystem services and cultural values.

=== Protected areas and climate change ===
Change in average temperature

Protected Areas alleviate climate change effects in a variety of ways:

- Prohibition of degradative activities including: fishing, hunting, development, agriculture, mining, logging, and sometimes entry.
- Reduction in: shifts in species distribution, intensity of storms, and impacts of sea level rise.

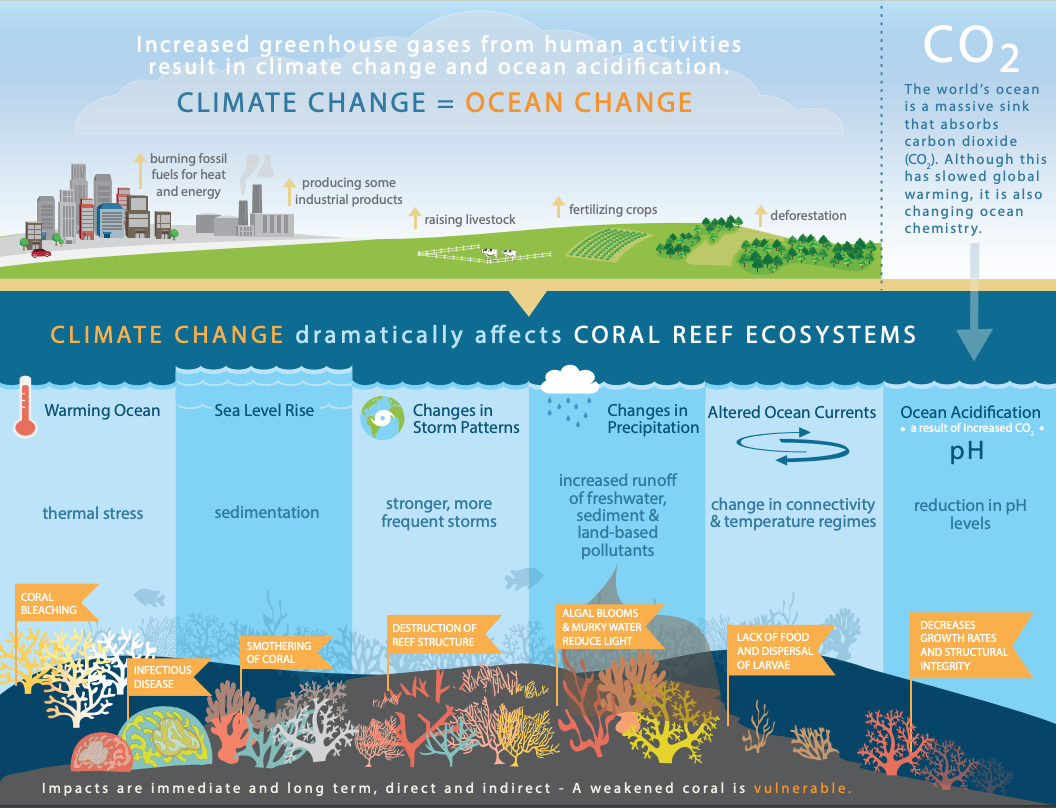
Climate change threats to coral reefs

- Combats ocean acidification by: maintaining coastal primary producers, increasing teleost biomass (osmosregulation buffers pH change), and increasing natural carbon sequestration via the biological pump.
- Increased: populations, species resilience, genetic diversity, and potential for adaptations, lowering the risk of extinction.

== Protection of natural resources ==
The objective of protected areas is to conserve biodiversity and to provide a way for measuring the progress of such conservation. Protected areas will usually encompass several other zones that have been deemed important for particular conservation uses, such as Important Bird Areas (IBA) and Endemic Bird Areas (EBA), Centres of Plant Diversity (CPD), Indigenous and Community Conserved Areas (ICCA), Alliance for Zero Extinction Sites (AZE) and Key Biodiversity Areas (KBA) among others. Likewise, a protected area or an entire network of protected areas may lie within a larger geographic zone that is recognised as a terrestrial or marine ecoregions (see Global 200), or a Crisis Ecoregions for example.

As a result, Protected Areas can encompass a broad range of governance types. A wide variety of rights-holders and stakeholders are involved in the governance and management of protected areas, including forest protected areas, such as government agencies and ministries at various levels, elected and traditional authorities, indigenous peoples and local communities, private individuals and non-profit trusts, among others. Most protected-area and forest management institutions acknowledge the importance of recognizing the rights of indigenous peoples and local communities, sharing the costs and benefits of protected areas and actively involving them in their governance and management. This has led to the recognition of four main types of governance, defined on the basis of who holds authority, responsibility, and who can be held accountable for the key decisions for protected areas. Governance of protected areas has emerged a critical factor in their success.

The area of forest in legally established protected areas worldwide is estimated at 813 million ha, which is around 20% of the total forest area. Of the six regions, Asia has the largest share of forests in protected areas, at 26%. The area of forest in protected areas has increased by 251 million ha globally since 1990. Globally in 2025, 386 million ha of forest is designated primarily for the protection of soil and water, an increase of 123 million ha since 1990. The rate of increase in the forest area allocated for this purpose has grown over time and especially in the most recent decade. Of the regions, Europe had the largest area of forest designated for the protection of soil and water, at 173 million ha, which is 17% of the region’s total forest area. The largest proportion of forest designated for the protection of soil and water is in Asia, at 20%.

The range of natural resources that any one protected area may guard is vast. Many will be allocated primarily for species conservation whether it be flora or fauna or the relationship between them, but protected areas are similarly important for conserving sites of (indigenous) cultural importance and considerable reserves of natural resources such as;

- Carbon stocks: Carbon emissions from deforestation account for an estimated 20% of global carbon emissions, so in protecting the worlds carbon stocks greenhouse gas emissions are reduced and longterm land cover change is prevented, which is an effective strategy in the struggle against global warming. Of all global terrestrial carbon stock, 15.2% is contained within protected areas. Protected areas in South America hold 27% of the world's carbon stock, which is the highest percentage of any continent in both absolute terms and as a proportion of the total stock.
- Rainforests: 18.8% of the world's forest is covered by protected areas and sixteen of the twenty forest types have 10% or more protected area coverage. Of the 670 ecoregions with forest cover, 54% have 10% or more of their forest cover protected under IUCN Categories I – VI.
- Mountains: Nationally designated protected areas cover 14.3% of the world's mountain areas, and these mountainous protected areas made up 32.5% of the world's total terrestrial protected area coverage in 2009. Mountain protected area coverage has increased globally by 21% since 1990 and out of the 198 countries with mountain areas, 43.9% still have less than 10% of their mountain areas protected.

Annual updates on each of these analyses are made in order to make comparisons to the Millennium Development Goals and several other fields of analysis are expected to be introduced in the monitoring of protected areas management effectiveness, such as freshwater and marine or coastal studies which are currently underway, and islands and drylands which are currently in planning.

== Protection of biodiversity ==
The effectiveness of protected areas to protect biodiversity can be estimated by comparing population changes over time. Such an analysis found that the abundance of 2,239 terrestrial vertebrate populations changed at slower rate in protected areas. On average, vertebrate populations declined five times more slowly within protected areas (−0.4% per year) than at similar sites lacking protection (−1.8% per year).

== Protection of ecosystem services ==
Along with providing important stocks of natural resources, protected areas are often major sources of vital ecosystem services, unbeknownst to human society. Although biodiversity is usually the main reason for constructing protected areas, the protection of biodiversity also protects the ecosystem services society enjoys. Some ecosystem services include those that provide and regulate resources, support natural processes, or represent culture. Provisioning services provide resources to humanity, such as fuel and water, while regulating services include carbon sequestration, climate regulation, and protection against disease. Supporting ecosystem services include nutrient cycling, while cultural services are a source of aesthetic and cultural value for tourism and heritage.

Such services are often overlooked by humanity, due to the ecosystem from which they originate being far from urbanized areas. The contamination of ecosystem services within a designated area ultimately degrades their use for society. For example, the protection of a water body inherently protects that water body's microorganisms and their ability to adequately filter pollutants and pathogens, ultimately protecting water quality itself. Therefore, the implementation of protected areas is vital to maintaining the quality and consistency of ecosystem services, ultimately allowing human society to function without the interference of human infrastructure or policies.

== IUCN Protected Area Management Categories ==
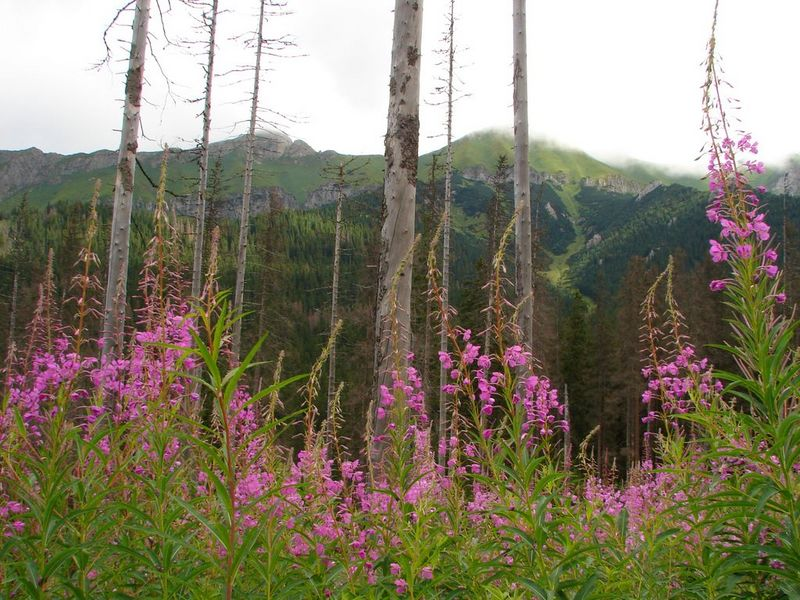
Strict nature reserve Belianske Tatras in Slovakia

Through its World Commission on Protected Areas (WCPA), the IUCN has developed six Protected Area Management Categories that define protected areas according to their management objectives, which are internationally recognised by various national governments and the United Nations. The categories provide international standards for defining protected areas and encourage conservation planning according to their management aims.

IUCN Protected Area Management Categories:

- Category Ia – Strict nature reserve
- Category Ib – Wilderness Area
- Category II – National park
- Category III – Natural monument or Feature
- Category IV – Habitat/Species Management Area
- Category V – Protected Landscape/Seascape
- Category VI – Protected Area with sustainable use of natural resources

== History ==
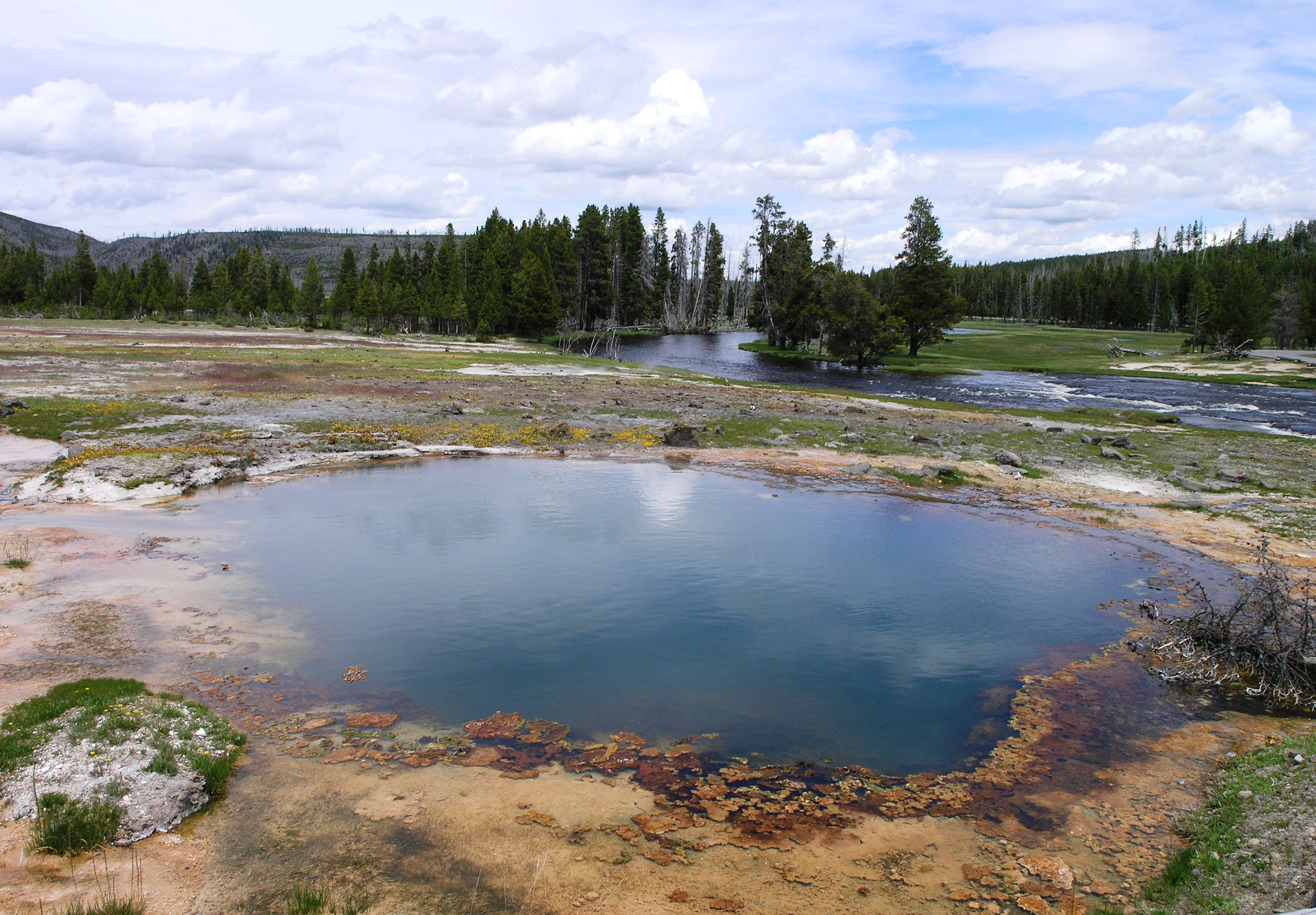
Black Opal Spring in Yellowstone National Park in the United States. Yellowstone, the world's second official protected area (after Mongolia's Bogd Khan Mountain), was declared a protected area in 1872, and it encompasses areas which are classified as both a National Park (Category II) and a Habitat Management Area (Category IV).

Protected areas are cultural artifacts, and their story is entwined with that of human civilization. Protecting places and natural resources is by no means a modern concept, whether it be indigenous communities guarding sacred sites or the convention of European hunting reserves. Over 2000 years ago, royal decrees in India protected certain areas. In Europe, rich and powerful people protected hunting grounds for a thousand years. Moreover, the idea of protection of special places is universal: for example, it occurs among the communities in the Pacific ("tapu" areas) and in parts of Africa (sacred groves).

The oldest legally protected reserve recorded in history is the Main Ridge Forest Reserve, established by an ordinance dated 13 April 1776. Other sources mention the 1778 approval of a protected area on then-Khan Uul, a mountain previous protected by local nomads for centuries in Mongolia, by then-ruling Qing China Tenger Tetgegch Khaan. However, the mass protected areas movement did not begin until late nineteenth-century in North America, Australia, New Zealand and South Africa, when other countries were quick to follow suit. While the idea of protected areas spread around the world in the twentieth century, the driving force was different in different regions. Thus, in North America, protected areas were about safeguarding dramatic and sublime scenery; in Africa, the concern was with game parks; in Europe, landscape protection was more common.

The designation of protected areas often also contained a political statement. In the 17th and 18th centuries, protected areas were mostly hunting grounds of rulers and thus, on the one hand, an expression of the absolute personal authority of a monarch, and on the other hand, they were concentrated in certain places and diminished with increasing spatial distance from the seat of power. In the late 19th century, modern territorial states emerged which, thanks to the transport and communication technologies of industrialisation and the closely meshed and well-connected administrative apparatus that came with it, could actually assert claims to power over large contiguous territories. The establishment of nature reserves in mostly peripheral regions thus became possible and at the same time underpinned the new state claim to power.

Initially, protected areas were recognised on a national scale, differing from country to country until 1933, when an effort to reach an international consensus on the standards and terminology of protected areas took place at the International Conference for the Protection of Fauna and Flora in London. At the 1962 First World Conference on National Parks in Seattle the effect the Industrial Revolution had had on the world's natural environment was acknowledged, and the need to preserve it for future generations was established.

Since then, it has been an international commitment on behalf of both governments and non-government organisations to maintain the networks that hold regular revisions for the succinct categorisations that have been developed to regulate and record protected areas. In 1972, the Stockholm Declaration of the United Nations Conference on the Human Environment endorsed the protection of representative examples of all major ecosystem types as a fundamental requirement of national conservation programmes. This has become a core principle of conservation biology and has remained so in recent resolutions – including the World Charter for Nature in 1982, the Rio Declaration at the Earth Summit in 1992, and the Johannesburg Declaration 2002.

Recently, the importance of protected areas has been brought to the fore at the threat of human-induced global heating and the understanding of the necessity to consume natural resources in a sustainable manner. The spectrum of benefits and values of protected areas is recognised not only ecologically, but culturally through further development in the arena of Indigenous and Community Conserved Areas (ICCAs). ICCAs are "natural and/or modified ecosystems containing significant bio - diversity values and ecological services, voluntarily conserved by (sedentary and mobile) indigenous and local communities, through customary laws or other effective means".

As of December 2022, 17% of land territory and 10% of ocean territory were protected. At the 2022 United Nations Biodiversity Conference almost 200 countries, signed onto the agreement which includes protecting 30% of land and oceans by 2030 (30 by 30).

== Convention on Biological Diversity ==
In 1992, a protected area was defined in paragraph 2 of the Convention on Biological Diversity (CBD) as "a geographically defined area which is designated or regulated and managed to achieve specific conservation objectives". Under Article 8 of the CBD, parties who entered the treaty agreed to, among other things, "establish a system of protected areas".

In 2004, the CBD's Conference of the Parties (COP) adopted the Program of Work on Protected Areas (PoWPA) to further develop and promote protected areas. PoWPA's objective was the "establishment and maintenance by 2010 for terrestrial and by 2012 for marine areas of comprehensive, effectively managed, and ecologically representative national and regional systems of protected areas that collectively, inter alia through a global network contribute to achieving the three objectives of the Convention and the 2010 target to significantly reduce the current rate of biodiversity loss".

In 2010, protected areas were included in Target 11 of the CBD's Strategic Plan for Biodiversity, known as the Aichi Biodiversity Targets. Target 11 states:

"By 2020, at least 17 per cent of terrestrial and inland water areas, especially areas of particular importance for biodiversity and ecosystem services, are conserved through effectively and equitably managed, ecologically representative and well-connected systems of protected areas and other effective area-based conservation measures, and integrated into the wider landscapes".

In 2018, to complement protected areas across landscapes and seascapes, the term 'other effective area-based conservation measures' was defined as "a geographically defined area other than a Protected Area, which is governed and managed in ways that achieve positive and sustained long-term outcomes for the in situ conservation of biodiversity, with associated ecosystem functions and services and where applicable, cultural, spiritual, socio-economic, and other locally relevant values". Other effective area-based conservation measures complement protected areas across landscapes, seascapes, and river basins. Protected areas and other effective area-based conservation measures are referenced together in Target 3 of the draft Global Biodiversity Framework, which is due to be agreed at the 15th Conference of the Parties to the UN Convention on Biological Diversity, which will be held 5 to 17 December in Montreal, Canada.

== Challenges ==
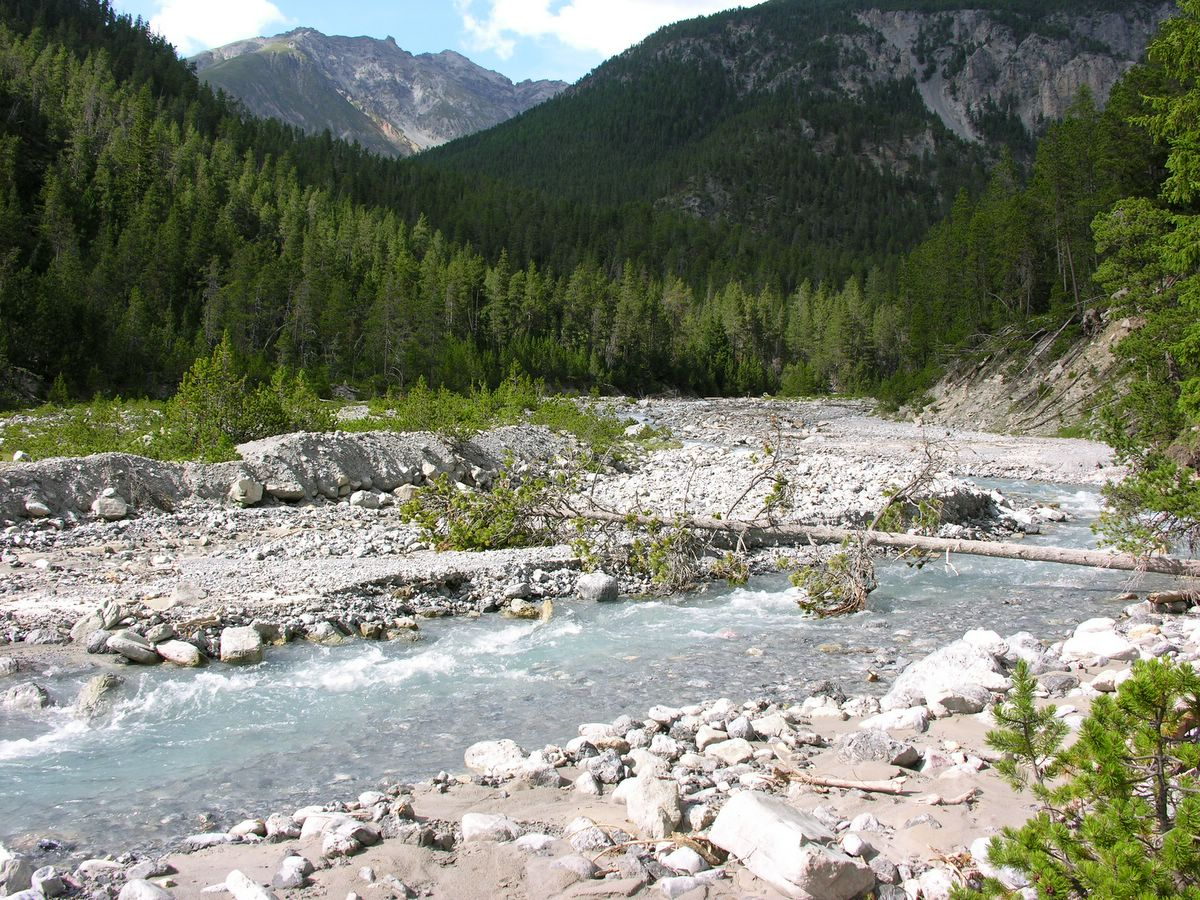
Schweizerischer National Park in the Swiss Alps is a Strict Nature Reserve (Category Ia).

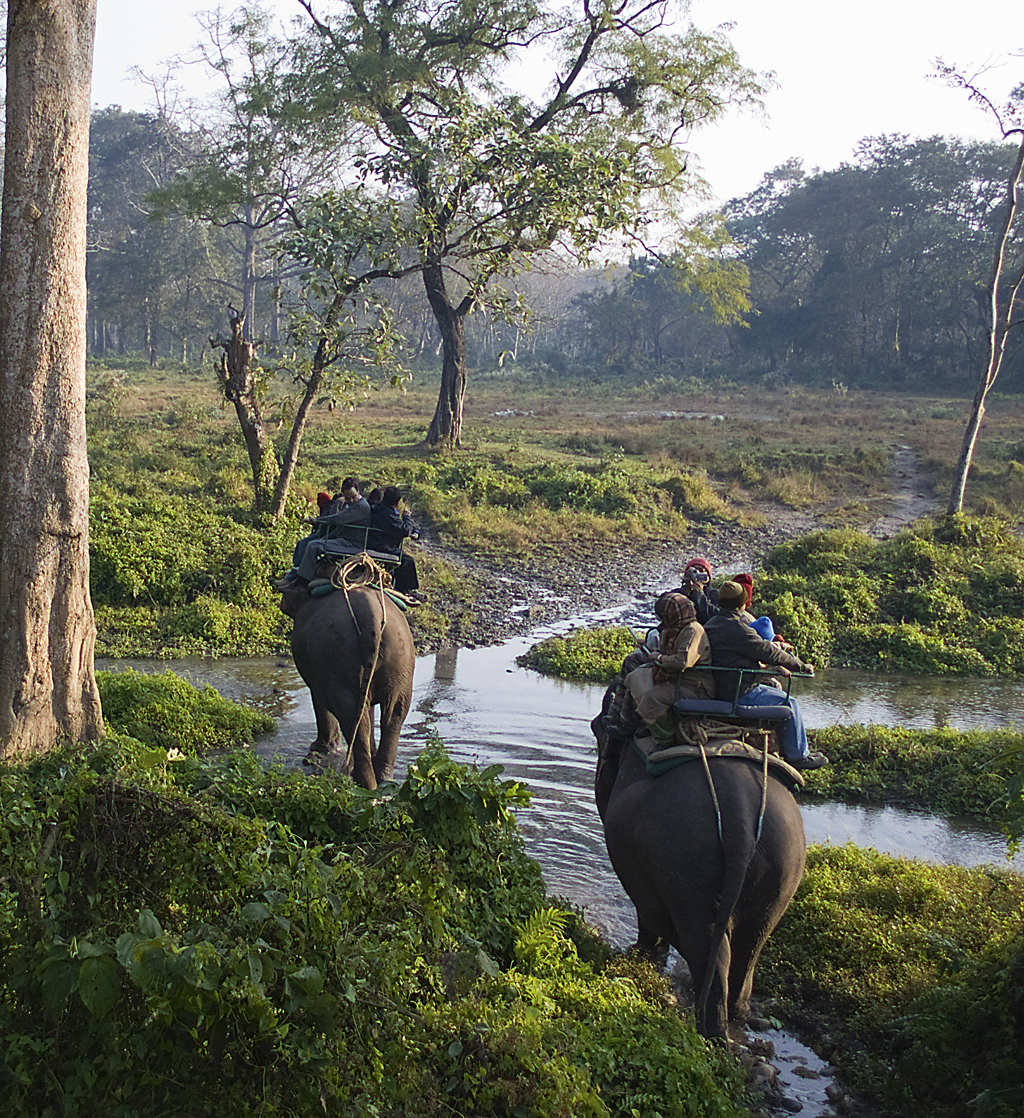
The Jaldapara National Park in West Bengal, India, is a Habitat Management Area (Category IV).

How to manage areas protected for conservation brings up a range of challenges – whether it be regarding the local population, specific ecosystems or the design of the reserve itself – and because of the many unpredicatable elements in ecology issues, each protected area requires a case-specific set of guidelines.

Enforcing protected area boundaries is a costly and labour-heavy endeavour, particularly if the allocation of a new protected region places new restrictions on the use of resources by the native people which may lead to their subsequent displacement. This has troubled relationships between conservationists and rural communities in many protected regions and is often why many Wildlife Reserves and National Parks face the human threat of poaching for the illegal bushmeat or trophy trades, which are resorted to as an alternative form of substinence. Poaching has thus increased in recent years as areas with certain species are no longer easily and legally accessible. This increasing threat has often led governments to enforce laws and implement new policies to adhere to the initial goal of protected areas, though many illegal activities are often overlooked.

There is increasing pressure to take proper account of human needs when setting up protected areas and these sometimes have to be "traded off" against conservation needs. Whereas in the past governments often made decisions about protected areas and informed local people afterwards, today the emphasis is shifting towards greater discussions with stakeholders and joint decisions about how such lands should be set aside and managed. Such negotiations are never easy but usually produce stronger and longer-lasting results for both conservation and people.

In some countries, protected areas can be assigned without the infrastructure and networking needed to substitute consumable resources and substantively protect the area from development or misuse. The soliciting of protected areas may require regulation to the level of meeting demands for food, feed, livestock and fuel, and the legal enforcement of not only the protected area itself but also 'buffer zones' surrounding it, which may help to resist destabilisation.

Protected area downgrading, downsizing, and degazettement (PADDD)

Protected area downgrading, downsizing, and degazettement (PADDD) events are processes that change the legal status of national parks and other protected areas in both terrestrial and marine environments. Downgrading is a decrease in legal restrictions on human activities within a protected area, downsizing is a decrease in protected area size through a legal boundary change, and degazettement is the loss of legal protection for an entire protected area. Collectively, PADDD represents legal processes that temper regulations, shrink boundaries, or eliminate legal protections originally associated with establishment of a protected area.

Scientific publications have identified 3,749 enacted PADDD events in 73 countries since 1892 which have collectively impacted an area approximately the size of Mexico. PADDD is a historical and contemporary phenomenon. 78% of PADDD events worldwide were enacted since 2000 and governments in at least 14 countries are currently considering at least 46 PADDD proposals. Proximate causes of PADDD vary widely but most PADDD events globally (62%) are related to industrial scale resource extraction and development – infrastructure, industrial agriculture, mining, oil and gas, forestry, fisheries, and industrialization.

PADDD challenges the longstanding assumption that protected areas are permanent fixtures and highlights the need for decision-makers to consider protected area characteristics and the socioeconomic context in which they are situated to better ensure their permanence.

== Effectiveness ==
A main goal of protected areas is to prevent loss of biodiversity. However, their effectiveness is limited by their small size and isolation from each other (which influence the maintenance of species), their restricted role in preventing climate change, invasive species, and pollution, their high costs, and their increasing conflict with human demands for nature's resources. In addition, the type of habitat, species composition, legal issues and governance —as seen in recent evaluations of community-managed areas in Madagascar—play important roles.

One major problem is that only 18% of the area covered by protected areas have been assessed, hence the effectiveness of most of them remains unclear.

== Bhutan as a role model ==
Scientists advocate that 50% of global land and seas be converted to inter-connected protected areas to sustain these benefits. The Asian country Bhutan achieved this high-reaching target by reserving 51.4% of the country's area as protected areas interconnected through biological corridors. Although these networks are well regulated (local communities are aware of their importance and actively contribute to their maintenance), Bhutan is currently a developing country that is undergoing infrastructure development and resource collection. The country's economic progression has brought about human-wildlife conflict and increased pressure on the existence of its protected areas. In light of ongoing disputes on the topic of optimal land usage, Dorji (et al.), in a study using camera traps to detect wildlife activity, summarize the results of a nationwide survey that compares the biodiversity of Bhutan's protected areas versus that of intervening non-protected areas.

The study indicated that Bhutan's protected areas "are effectively conserving medium and large mammal species, as demonstrated through the significant difference in mammal diversity between protected areas, biological corridors, and non-protected areas with the strongest difference between protected areas and non-protected areas". Protected areas had the highest levels of mammal biodiversity. This is made possible by the restriction of commercial activity and regulation of consumptive uses (firewood, timber, etc.). The regulation of such practices has allowed Bhutan's protected areas to thrive with high carnivore diversity and other rare mammals such as Chinese pangolin, Indian pangolin, mountain weasel (Mustela altaica), small-toothed ferret badger, Asian small clawed otter, the tiger, dhole (Cuon alpinus), Binturong, clouded leopard and Tibetan fox (Vulpes ferrilata). Also found to be prevalent were the large herbivore species: Asiatic water buffalo Bubalus arnee, golden langur, musk deer, and Asian elephant. The maintenance of these charismatic megafauna and other threatened species can be attributed to the intensity of Bhutan's management of its protected areas and its local communities' commitment to preserving them.

== By region ==
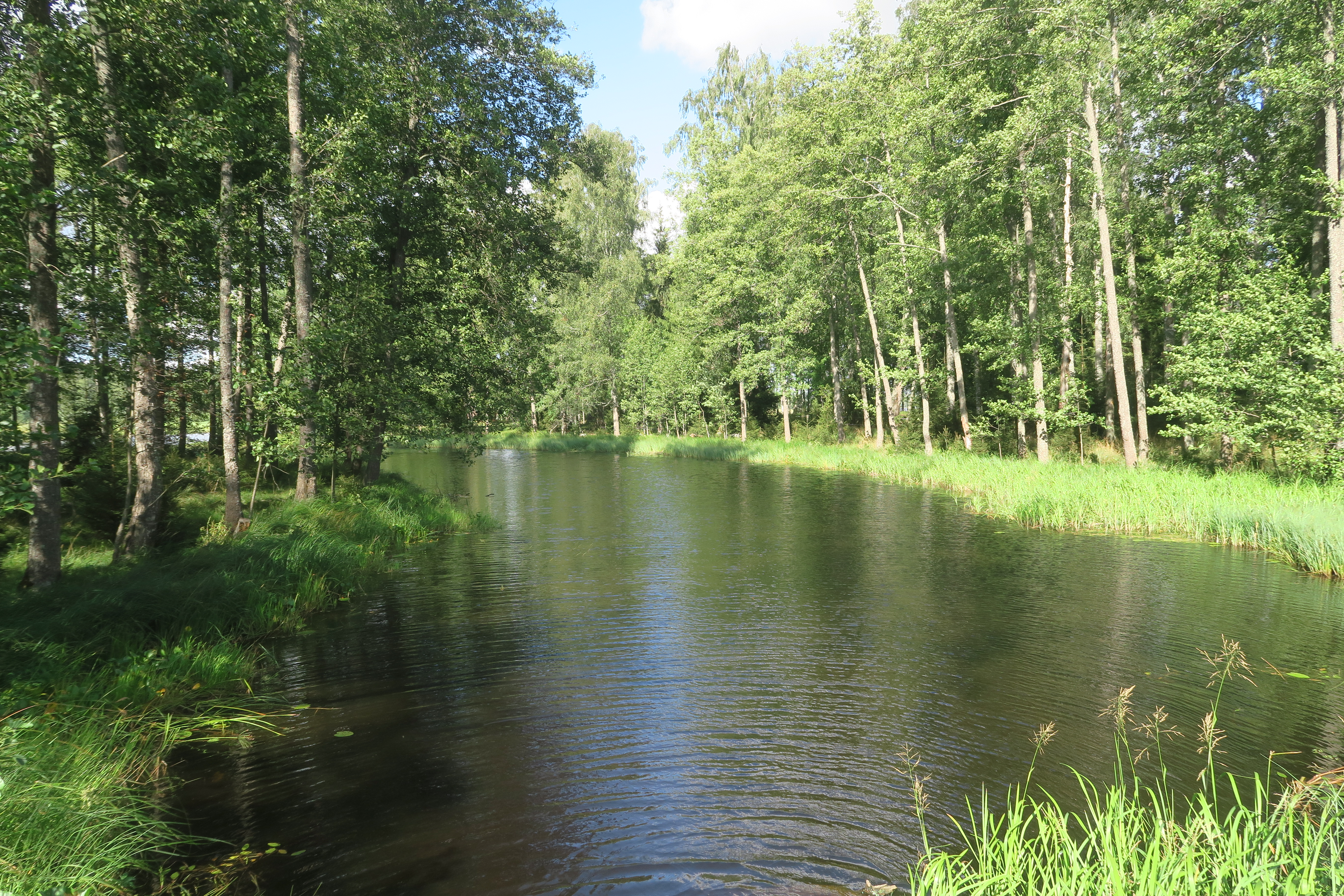
Kuivajärvi, the Natura 2000 area in Tammela, Kanta-Häme, Finland

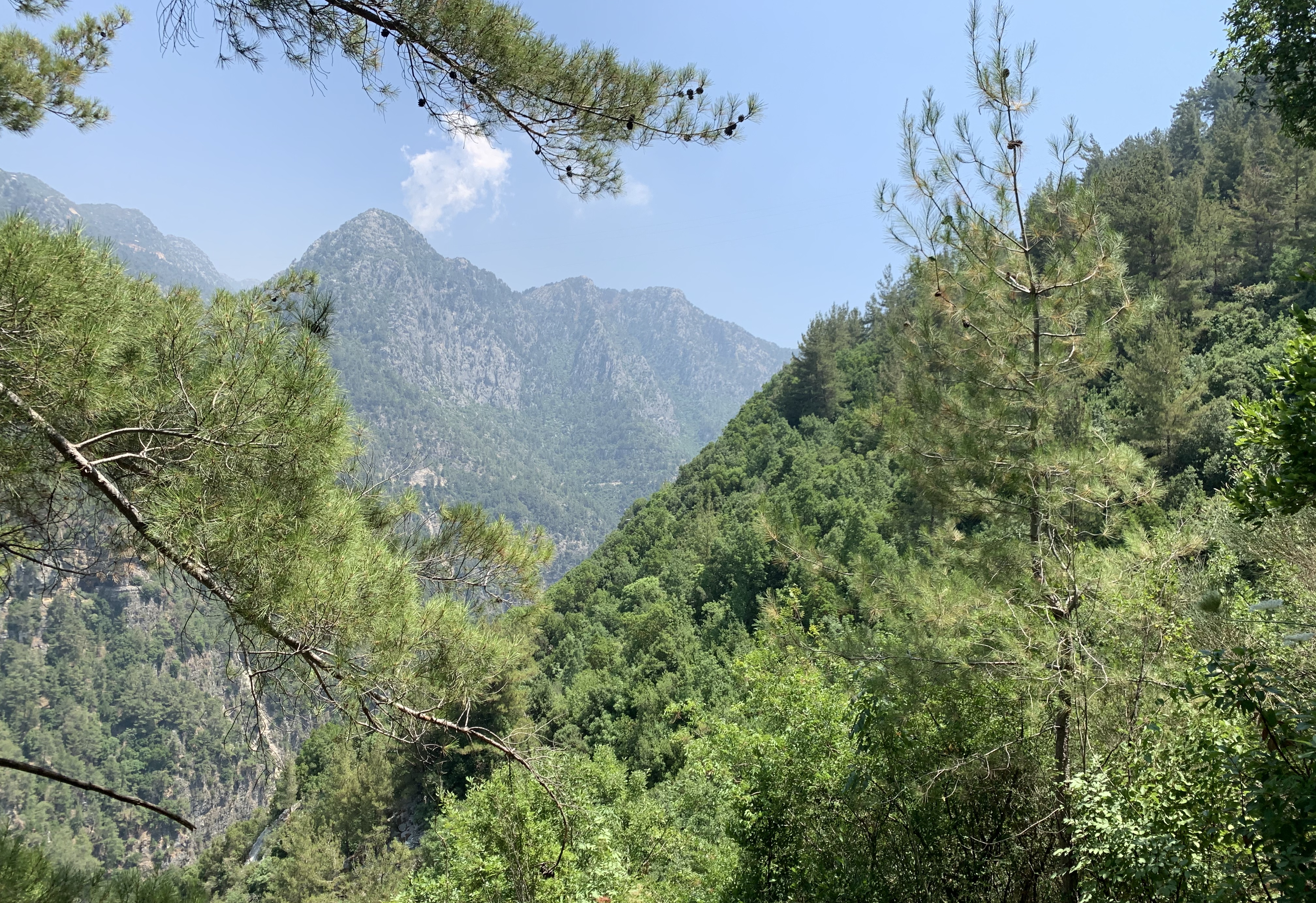
Jabal Moussa Biosphere Reserve in Lebanon

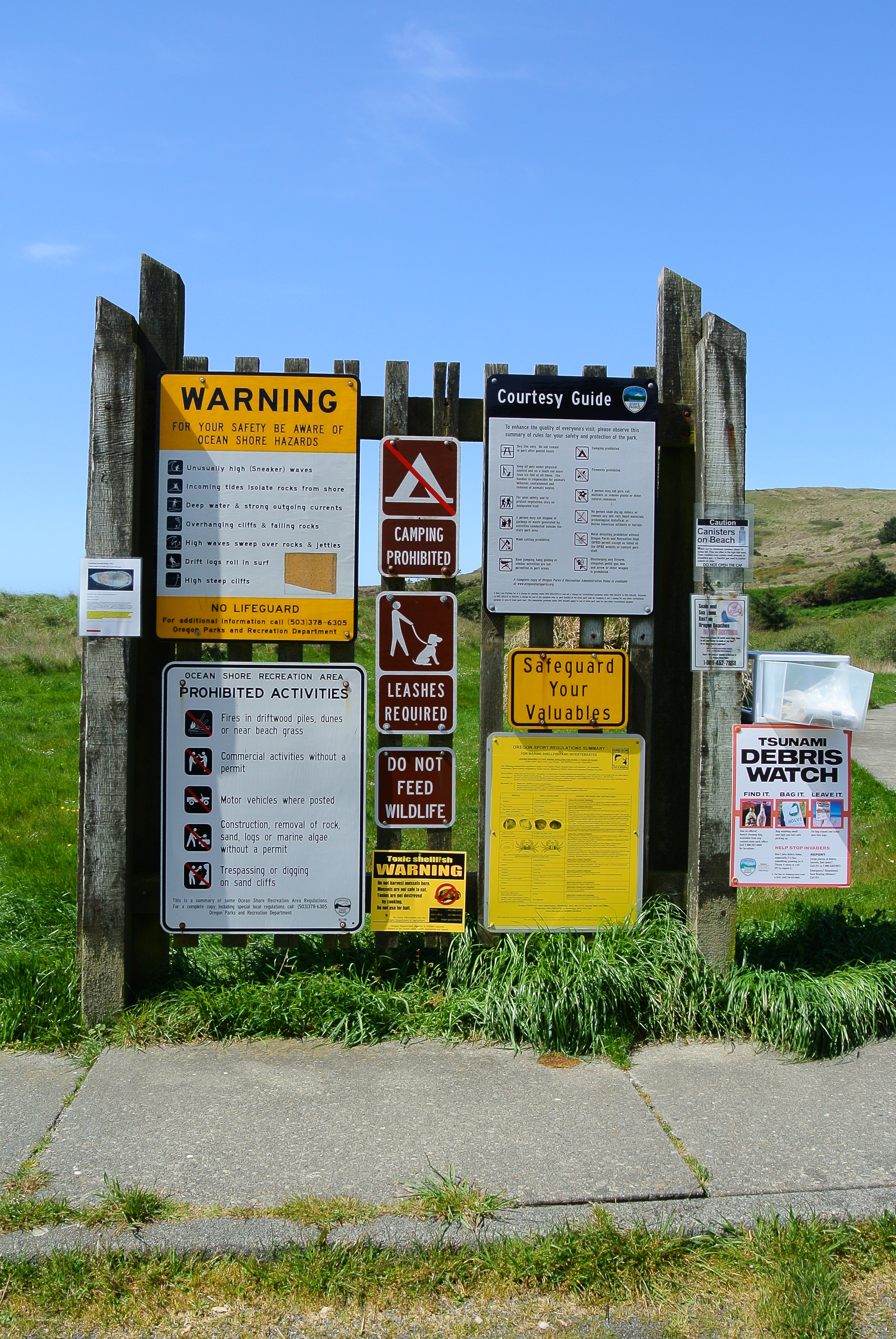
Prohibited activities and safety instructions at a state park in Oregon

=== Australia ===
The National Heritage List is a heritage register, a list of national heritage places deemed to be of outstanding heritage significance to Australia, established in 2003. The list includes natural and historic places, including those of cultural significance to Indigenous Australians. Indigenous Protected Areas (IPAs) are formed by agreement with Indigenous Australians, and declared by Indigenous Australians, and form a specific class of protected area.

Canada

Canada is the second-largest country in the world, having protected areas under both federal and provincial/territorial management. Numerous tourist destinations are officially recognized "protected areas". Examples include Banff National Park and Yoho National Park.

=== China ===
China, a megadiverse country, has begun implementing various protected areas in recent years. As of the year 2017, China has nearly 10,000 to 12,000 protected areas, 80% of which are nature reserves aiming to foster biodiversity conservation. These newly implemented reserves safeguard a range of ecosystems, from tropical forests to marine habitats. These protected areas encompass nearly 20% of China's land area.

=== European Union ===
Natura 2000 is a network of protected areas established by the EU across all member states. It is made up of Special Areas of Conservation (SACs) and Special Protection Areas (SPAs) designated respectively under the Habitats Directive and Birds Directive. 787,767 km^{2} (304,159 mi^{2}) are designated as terrestrial sites and 251,564 km^{2} (97,129 sq mi) as marine sites. Overall, 18 percent of the EU land mass is designated.

=== India ===
Protected areas of India include National parks, Wildlife sanctuaries, biosphere reserves, reserved and protected forests, conservation and community reserves, communal forests, private protected areas and conservation areas.

=== Indonesia ===
Conservation of nature in Indonesia legally refers to two main laws or Undang - Undang (UU), namely UU no. 5 of 1990 concerning Conservation of Biological Natural Resources and Ecosystems; and UU no. 41 of 1999 concerning Forestry (jo. UU no. 5 of 1967 concerning Basic Provisions on Forestry). There are over 500 protected areas in Indonesia, of which 57 National Parks and another nature and game reserves cover overall 36.1 million ha land area. The total protected land area represents over 18.9% of Indonesia's landmass.

=== Lebanon ===
Lebanon, home to one of the highest densities of floral diversity in the Mediterranean basin, hosts tree species with critical biogeographical locations (southernmost limit) on the western slopes of Mount Lebanon's mountain range and has passed laws to protect environmental sites at the national level, including nature reserves, forests, and Hima (local community-based conservation), with some of these sites having acquired one or more international designations:

- Four Ramsar sites
- Five UNESCO World Heritage Sites
- 15 Important Bird Areas (IBAs) (under Birdlife International)
- One Specially Protected Area (SPA)
- Two Specially Protected Areas of Mediterranean Importance (SPAMI) (under the Protocol of Specially Protected Areas and Biodiversity of the Barcelona Convention)

There are three biosphere reserves in Lebanon that have been designated by the UNESCO:

1. Al Shouf Cedar Nature Reserve, designated in 2005
2. Jabal Al Rihane Biosphere Reserve, designated in 2007
3. Jabal Moussa Biosphere Reserve, designated in 2009

=== Nicaragua ===
O Parks, Wildlife, and Recreation is a private protected area, also known as a 'Private Reserve' predominantly managed for biodiversity conservation, protected without formal government recognition and is owned and stewarded by the O corporation International. O parks plays a particularly important role in conserving critical biodiversity in a section of the Mesoamerican Biological Corridor known as the Paso del Istmo, located along the 12-mile-wide isthmus between Lake Nicaragua and the Pacific Ocean.

=== Philippines ===
In the Philippines, protected areas are administered by the Biodiversity Management Bureau of the Department of Environment and Natural Resources (DENR) under the National Integrated Protected Areas System (NIPAS) Act of 1992.

As of 2020, there are 244 protected areas in the Philippines, covering a total area of about 7,760,000 hectares (19,200,000 acres) – 15.4% of the Philippines' total area.

=== Russia ===
On 21 May 2019, The Moscow Times cited a World Wildlife Fund report indicating that Russia now ranks first in the world for its amount of protected natural areas with 63.3 million hectares of specially protected natural areas. However, the article did not contain a link to WWF's report and it may be based on previously gathered data.

=== United States ===
As of 31 January 2008, according to the United Nations Environment Programme, the United States had a total of 6770 terrestrial nationally designated (federal) protected areas. These protected areas cover 2,607,131 km^{2} (1,006,619 mi^{2}), or 27.08 percent of the land area of the United States. This is also one-tenth of the protected land area of the world.

According to a report from the Center for American Progress, the administration of Joe Biden reached a record in conservation. In 3 years of ruling it conserved or in the process of conserving more than 24 millions acres of public land and in 2023 alone more than 12.5 million acres of public land became protected area. It is doing it together with the indigenous people as 200 agreements of co-stewardship with them were signed in 2023 alone. The goal of Biden is to protect 30% of the terrestrial and marine territory of the United States by the year 2030.

=== United Kingdom ===
In the United Kingdom, the term conservation area almost always applies to an area (usually urban or the core of a village) of special architectural or historic interest, the character of which is considered worthy of preservation or enhancement. It creates a precautionary approach to the loss or alteration of buildings and trees, thus it has some of the legislative and policy characteristics of listed buildings and tree preservation orders. The concept was introduced in 1967, and by 2017 almost 9,800 had been designated in England.

As of 2019, 2.2% of England making up 2,938 km^{2} (1,134 sq mi) is a conservation area, 59% of which are rural, and 41% are in urban areas.

== See also ==
- Biodiversity hotspots
- Buffer zone
- Coastal Reserve (Ukraine)
- Conservation area (United Kingdom) (urban heritage area in the UK)
- Conservation designation
- Conservation refugee: a person who has been forced to relocate from a conservation area
- Centres of Plant Diversity
- Climate change mitigation#Preserving and enhancing carbon sinks
- Exclusion zone
- Ecotourism
- Forest Preserve
- Fortress conservation
- Fossil park
- Historic district
- Indigenous and Community Conserved Area
- Last of the Wild
- List of largest protected areas in the world
- Listed building
- Marine Protected Area
- National heritage site
- National park
- Nature park
- Nature reserve
- Paper park
- Park ranger
- Private protected area
- Special Area of Conservation (European Union)
- Transboundary protected area
- Urban heritage park
- World Commission on Protected Areas
- World Database on Protected Areas
- World Heritage Site – registered by UNESCO
- zapovednik (strictly protected area in Russia)
- Zakaznik (type of protected area in former Soviet republics)

== Sources ==
This article incorporates text from a free content work. Licensed under CC BY 4.0 (license statement/permission). Text taken from Global Forest Resources Assessment 2025, Food and Agriculture Organization of the United Nations (FAO).
