= Other effective area-based conservation measures =

Specific areas designated to conserve biodiversity

Other effective area-based conservation measures (OECMs) are sites outside of protected areas that are governed and managed in ways that deliver the long-term in situ conservation of biodiversity. As of June 2026, 7,488 OECM sites have been reported to the World Database, managed by the UN Environment Programme World Conservation Monitoring Centre (UNEP WCMC). OECMs cover 2,263,318 km^{2} of Earth’s surface accounting for 1,484,472 km^{2} on land and 778,837 km^{2} of the ocean. This equates to 1.31% of Earth’s surface being considered an OECM, with 1.1% being terrestrial and .21% being marine.

== Definition and criteria ==
An OECM is defined by the Convention on Biological Diversity as:

[A] geographically defined area other than a Protected Area, which is governed and managed in ways that achieve positive and sustained long-term outcomes for the in situ conservation of biodiversity, with associated ecosystem functions and services and where applicable, cultural, spiritual, socio–economic, and other locally relevant values.

There are four criteria for identifying OECMs:

1. The area is not currently recognized as a protected area;
2. The area is governed and managed;
3. The area achieves sustained and effective contribution to in situ conservation of biodiversity; Criterion
4. Associated ecosystem functions and services and cultural, spiritual, socio-economic and other locally relevant values are conserved and respected.

Under the four criteria above, there are 26 sub-criteria.

== History ==
The term "other effective area-based conservation measures" was first used in Target 11 of the Convention on Biological Diversity’s Strategic Plan for Biodiversity, agreed to in Nagoya, Japan, in 2010. Target 11 stated:

By 2020, at least 17 per cent of terrestrial and inland water areas and 10 per cent of coastal and marine areas, especially areas of particular importance for biodiversity and ecosystem services, are conserved through effectively and equitably managed, ecologically representative and well connected systems of protected areas and other effective area-based conservation measures, and integrated into the wider landscapes and seascapes. (Emphasis added)

The absence of a formal definition for 'other effective area-based conservation measures' created a significant gap in global conservation policy, prompting the Canadian Council on Ecological Areas (CCEA) to take initiative. The CCEA was incorporated in 1982 as a national, non-profit organization with a mission “to facilitate and assist Canadians with the establishment and management of a comprehensive network of protected areas representative of Canada's terrestrial and aquatic ecological natural diversity." CCEA is composed of experts from all federal, provincial and territorial governments, as well as academic and non-governmental organizations, and is a member of the International Union for the Conservation of Nature (IUCN).

Recognizing the need for clarity and consistency, and the potential to include sites that do not contribute to the effective, in-situ conservation of biodiversity, through a series of workshops between 2013 and 2015, the CCEA developed comprehensive guidelines tailored to the Canadian context, which were subsequently published by MacKinnon et al. (2015) in the journal Biodiversity and Conservation.

The early criteria for the recognition of 'other effective area-based conservation measures' developed by the CCEA established the need to: (1) recognize areas consistent with the overall intent of protected areas, with the exception that they may be governed by regimes not previously recognized by reporting agencies; and (2) established that areas recognized should have an expressed objective to conserve nature, be long-term, generate effective nature conservation outcomes, and have governance regimes that ensure effective management.

These guidelines provided a foundational framework for identifying and evaluating OECMs globally, emphasizing their role in biodiversity conservation outside traditional protected areas. The CCEA's cascading influence extended beyond national borders when the World Commission on Protected Areas (WCPA) Task Force on OECMs adopted the CCEA criteria as a reference point in its deliberations. This work ultimately informed the definition developed by the Convention on Biological Diversity (CBD), which formalized the definition of OECMs in 2018 (detailed below), integrating the Canadian-led approach into international conservation standards. The progression from national initiative to global policy underscores Canada's leadership in shaping inclusive and effective conservation strategies.

In 2015, the International Union for Conservation of Nature World Commission on Protected Areas established a Task Force, which completed its work in 2020. The work is being advanced by the IUCN World Commission on Protected Areas Specialist Group to provide technical advice to the Convention on Biological Diversity. It submitted its advice to the Secretariat of the Convention on Biological Diversity in January 2018. That advice, together with a report on marine OECMs, as well as early work by the CCEA noted above, was considered at two workshops hosted by the Secretariat of the Convention on Biological Diversity in February 2018.

Parties to the Convention on Biological Diversity negotiated a draft decision at the 22nd meeting of the Subsidiary Body on Scientific, Technical and Technological Advice, and adopted Decision 14/8 on ‘Protected areas and other effective area-based conservation measures’ at the 14th meeting of the Conference of the Parties, which contains the definition and criteria for identifying OECMs.

‘Other effective area-based conservation measures’ are referenced in Target 3 of the Global Biodiversity Framework. The Framework was agreed upon in December 2022 at the 15th Conference of the Parties to the UN Convention on Biological Diversity in Montreal, Canada. Integration of OECMs into global biodiversity targets had been a topic of discussion in the lead-up to the conference. Target 3 calls on Parties to the Convention on Biological Diversity to:

"Ensure and enable that by 2030 at least 30 per cent of terrestrial, inland water, and of coastal and marine areas, especially areas of particular importance for biodiversity and ecosystem functions and services, are effectively conserved and managed through ecologically representative, well-connected and equitably governed systems of protected areas and other effective area-based conservation measures, recognizing indigenous and traditional territories, where applicable, and integrated into wider landscapes, seascapes and the ocean, while ensuring that any sustainable use, where appropriate in such areas, is fully consistent with conservation outcomes, recognizing and respecting the rights of indigenous peoples and local communities, including over their traditional territories."

== Global extent ==
The World Database on Other Effective Area-based Conservation Measures is managed by the UN Environment Programme World Conservation Monitoring Centre.

Locally managed marine areas (LMMAs) are one form of OECM; examples of these exist in Mozambique and Madagascar.

== Relationship between OECMs and protected areas ==
Protected areas and OECMs are distinct but complementary within landscapes, seascapes and river basins. Protected areas have a primary conservation objective, i.e., they are areas dedicated to the conservation of biodiversity and managed accordingly. In contrast, OECMs do not need to be dedicated to the conservation of nature but must deliver the effective and long-term in situ conservation of biodiversity. OECMs can deliver long-term in situ conservation through ancillary conservation, secondary conservation, and sometimes primary conservation in places that cannot, or will not, be recognized as protected areas.

OECMs are intended to take a more inclusive approach to biodiversity conservation that traditional protected areas, by permitting some small-scale area management. This is achieved by accounting for the needs of other rights holders such as small scale fisheries and low-impact agroforestry. Traditional protected areas have attracted controversy over Indigenous rights and displacement; OECMs are intended to be more equitable to human needs.

== See also ==
- Governance of protected areas
- UNESCO Biosphere Reserve
