= List of types of formally designated forests =

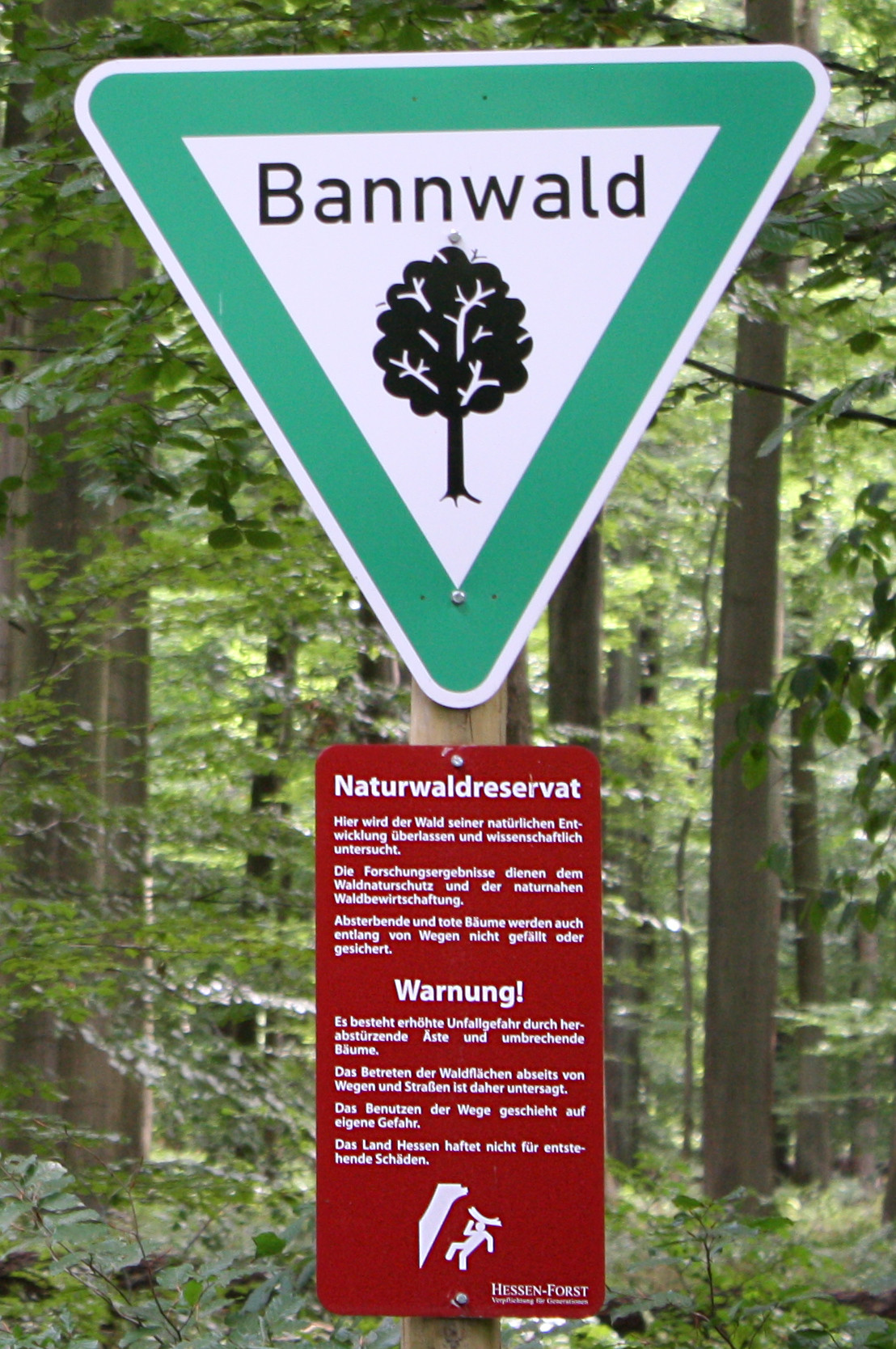
Bannwald, a protected forest, Germany

This is a list of types of formally designated forests, as institutionalized around the world. It is organized in three sublists: by forest ownership, protection status, and designated use.

== By ownership ==
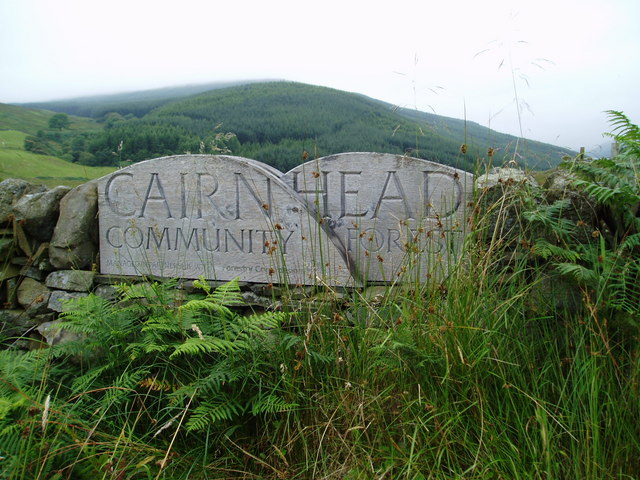
Cairnhead Community Forest, UK

- Church forests of Ethiopia — protected sacred forests around rural churches
- Community forest
  - Community forests in England
- Crown land
- Municipal forest

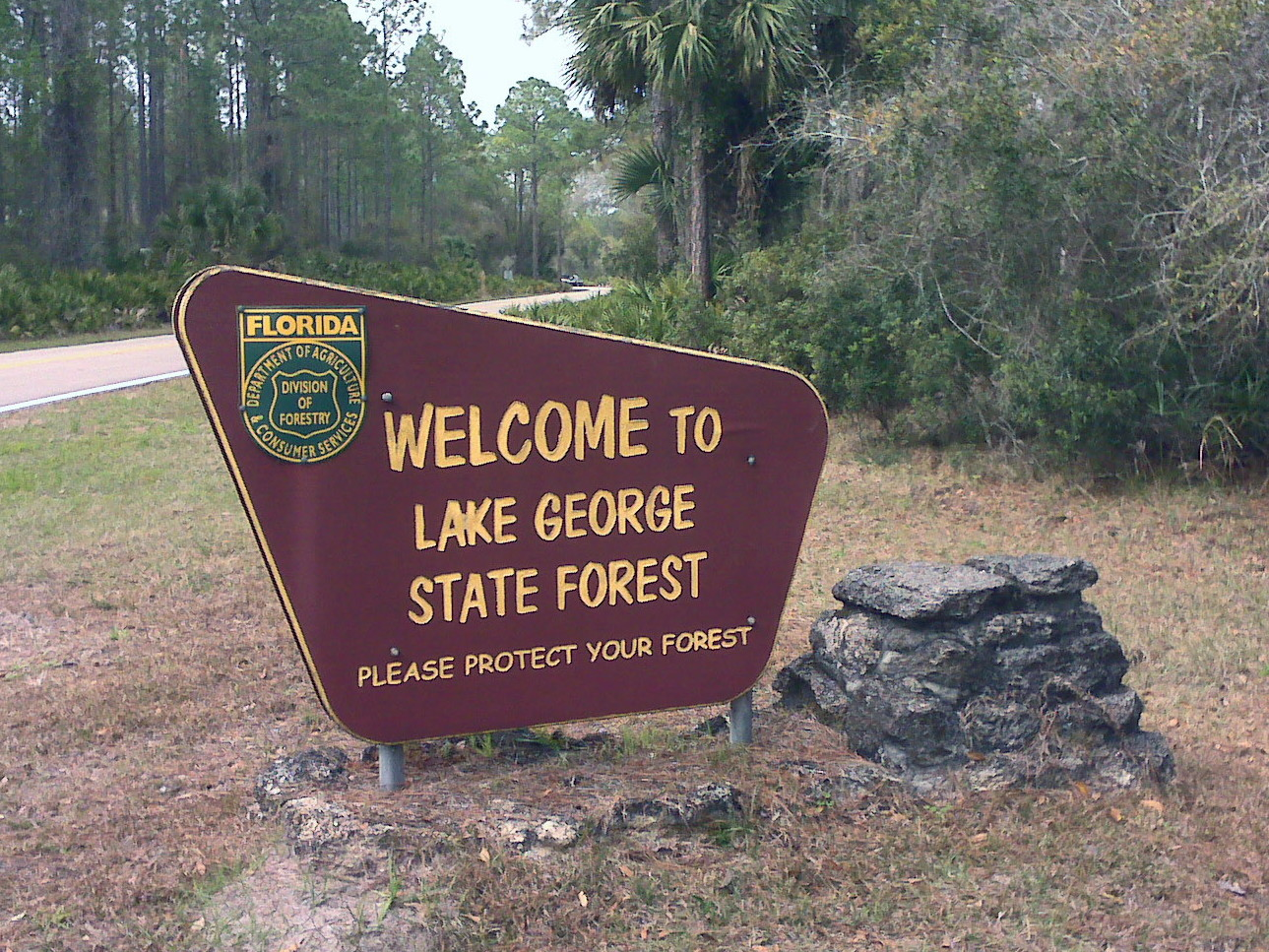
Lake George State Forest, Florida, USA

- National forest
  - National forest (Brazil) — a type of sustainable use protected area
  - The National Forest (England) — a government-supported environmental project in central England
  - National forest (France) — a forest that is owned by the French state, originating with the Edict of Moulins of 1566
  - National forest (United States) — classification of Federal lands in the United States
- National reserve — legal designation in the United States, beginning in 1978
- Private forest
  - Corporate forest
  - Private nonindustrial forest land
  - Private landowner assistance program — a class of U.S. government assistance program for maintaining, developing, improving and protecting wildlife
  - Private protected area
  - Private reserve
    - Private forest reserve
      - Private timber reserve (Tasmania)
    - Private nature reserve
- Provincial forest (Canada) — administered or protected by the province
- Royal forest — an area of land with varying meanings; not necessarily densely wooded
- State forest — administered or protected by an agency of a state; varies by jurisdiction
- Tribal forest — owned, controlled, and/or utilized by a (formally recognized) Indigenous or tribal group

== By protection status ==
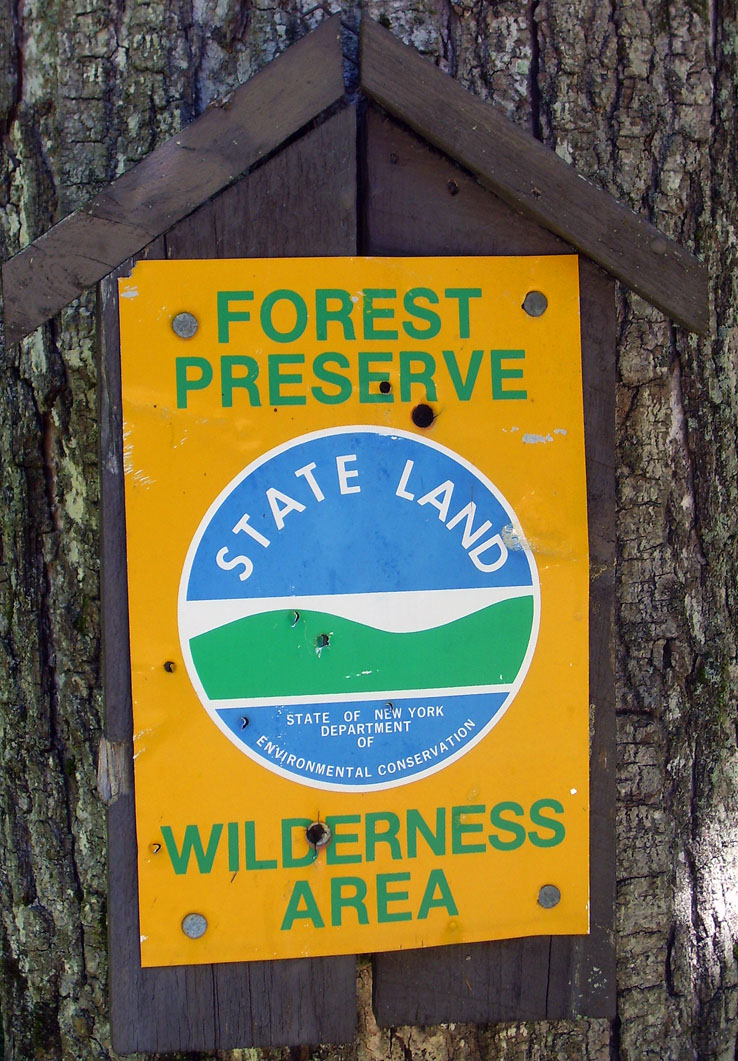
New York State Forest Preserve

- Ancient woodland - formal designation used in the United Kingdom
  - Ancient semi-natural woodland (ASNW) - composed of native tree species not obviously planted
- Bannwald - a protected forest area in parts of Germany and Austria
- Biosphere reserve - as designated by UNESCO
- Biological reserve

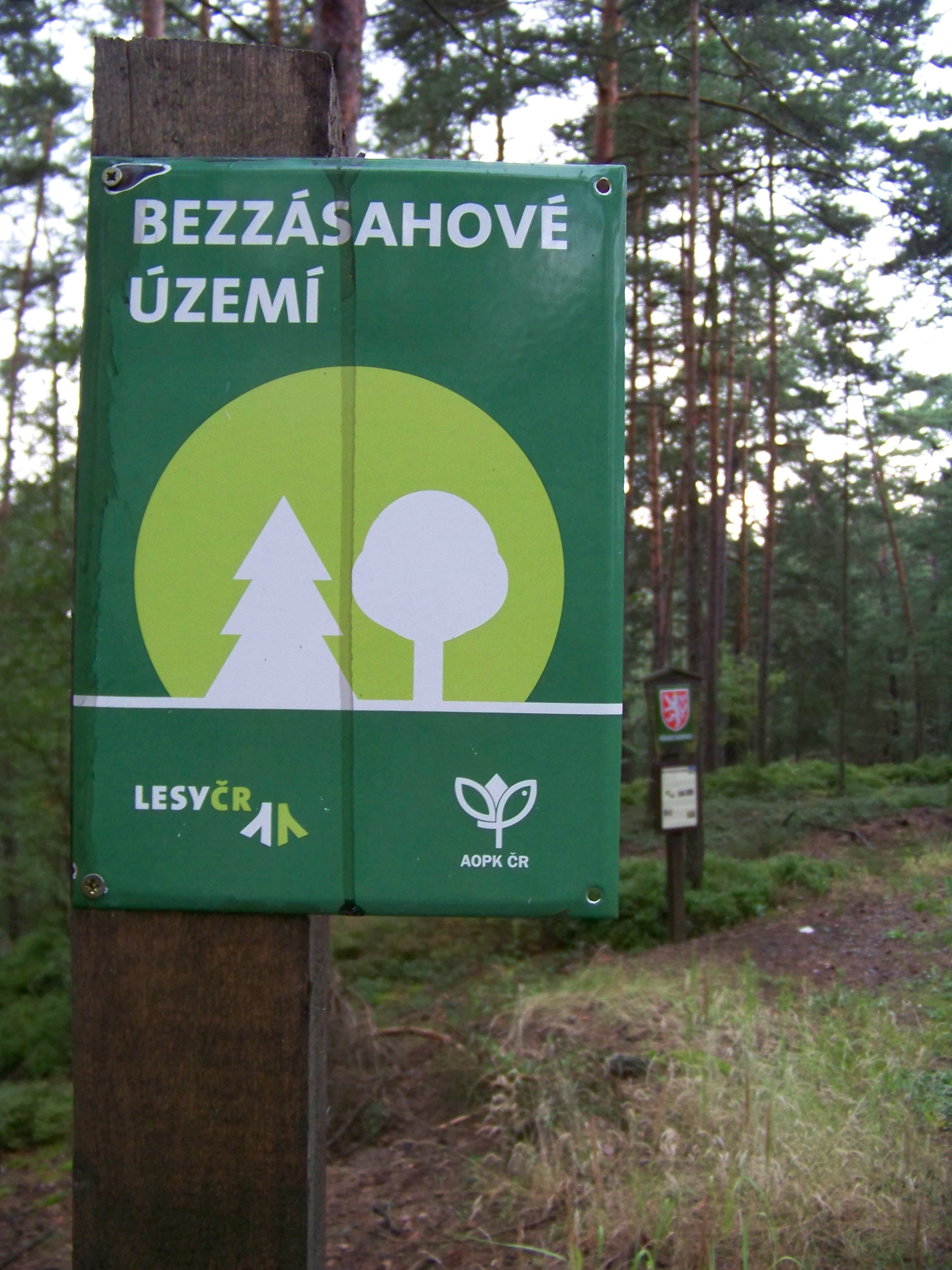
Protected landscape area of Kokořínsko, Czech Republic

- Conservation reserve - used in the United States' Conservation Reserve Program
- Forest circle - an administrative area including protected or resource-managed forests, used in India, Pakistan and Bangladesh
- Forest division - a non-overlapping subdivision of a forest circle, used in India, Pakistan and Bangladesh
- Forest park (The Gambia), as in Dobo Forest Park, Faba Forest Park, Finto Manereg Forest Park, etc.
- Forest preserve, formal dedication for state-owned lands within the constitutionally designated Adirondack and Catskill Parks of the U.S. state of New York, required to be kept forever wild.
- Forest protected area - formal designation of the International Union for Conservation of Nature and the World Commission on Protected Areas
- Forest range - a non-overlapping subdivision of a forest division, used in India, Pakistan and Bangladesh
- Forest reserve or preserve
  - Recreational forest reserve, e.g. the Recreational Forest Reserve of Fontinhas, Azores
- High-biodiversity wilderness area - an International Union for Conservation of Nature classification

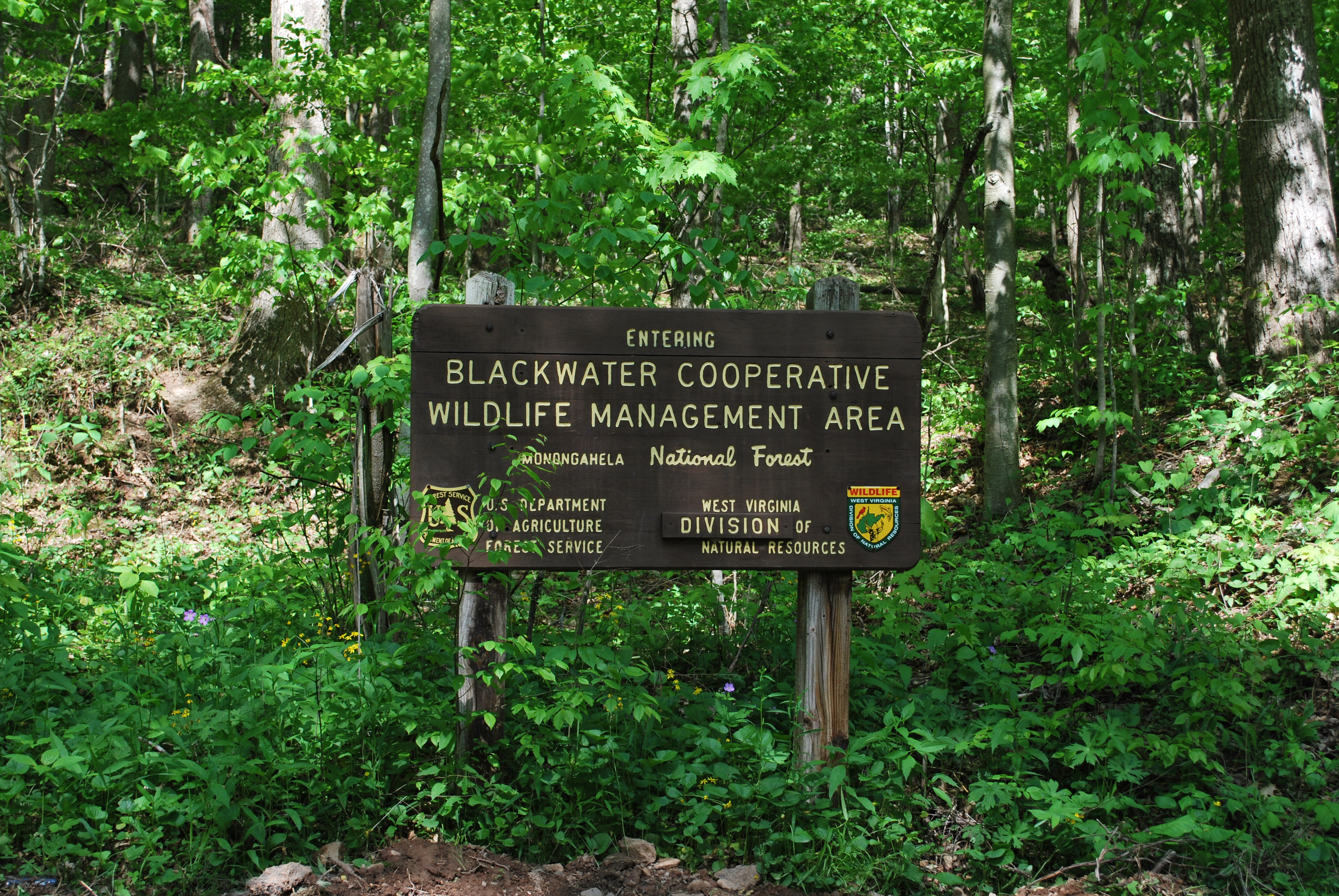
Wildlife Management Area, West Virginia, USA

- High conservation value area - developed by the Forest Stewardship Council as a means of defining regions with a specific environmental, socioeconomic, biodiversity or landscape value for use within forestry management certification systems
- High conservation value forest - a FSC designation for forests meeting criteria specified in its "Principles and Criteria of Forest Stewardship"
- Intact forest landscape - NGO-developed term used in forest monitoring
- Old-growth forest - in Australia, formal protection category in the Regional Forest Agreement
- Private natural heritage reserve - designation used in Brazil
- Protected forest - used in Cambodia and India
- Protected landscape - used in the Czech Republic
- Reserve forest - used to designate protected forest areas in British India; used today in Bangladesh, India, Kazakhstan and Pakistan to refer to forests accorded a special degree of protection
  - Reserved forests and protected forests of India
  - Protected and reserved forests of Pakistan
- Sacred grove - protected in Ghana, Nigeria and possibly elsewhere
  - Sacred groves of India

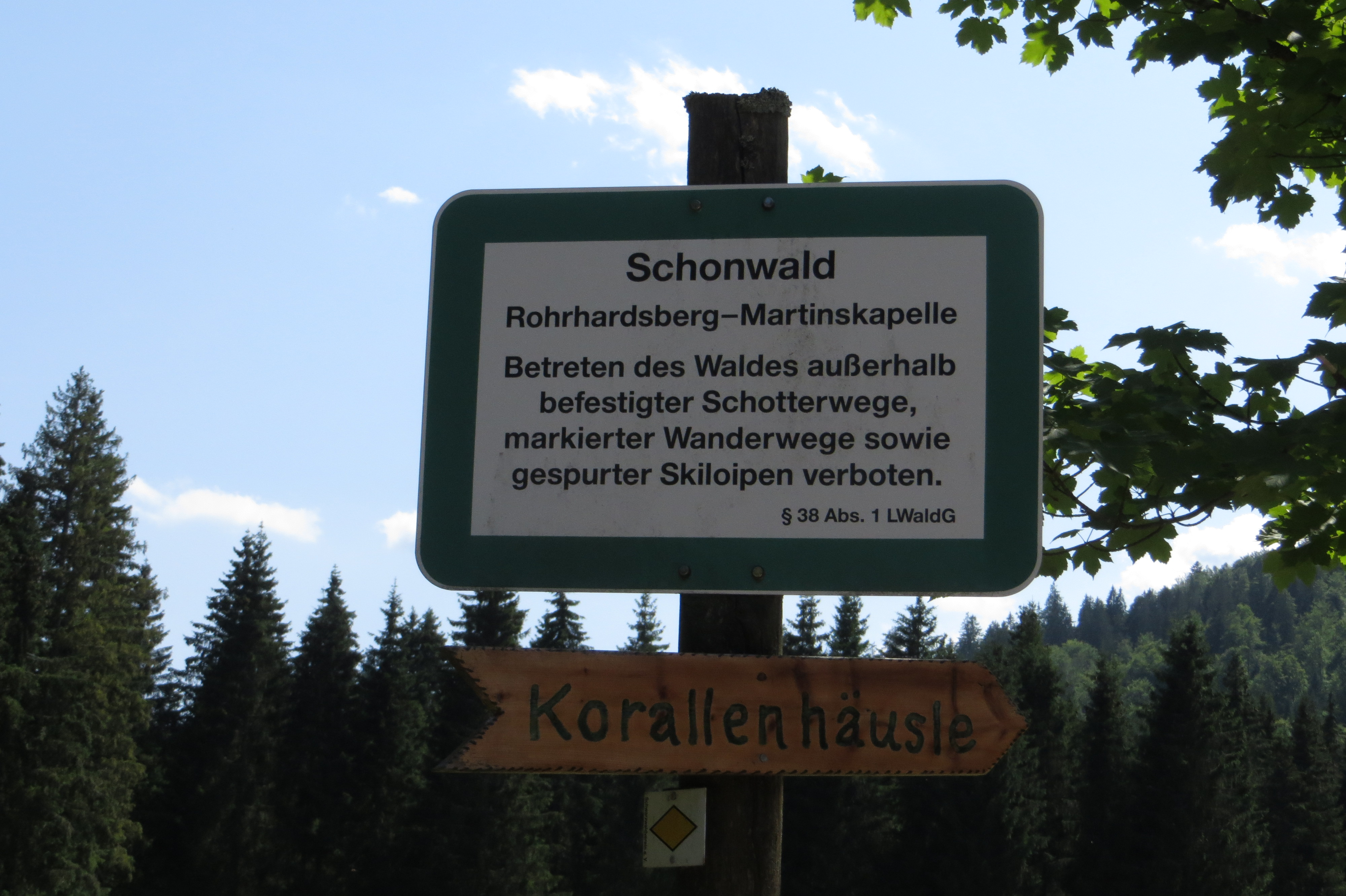
Schonwald near Schönwald, Baden-Württemberg

- Schonwald, a type of formally protected forest in Baden-Württemberg, Germany, in which economic usage of the forest is permitted under certain restrictions
- Wild forest, formal designation within the New York Forest Preserve
- Wilderness forest
- Wildlife forest
- Wildlife management area
- Wildlife reserve
  - Wildlife sanctuaries of India
- World Heritage Forest - formally recognized for special biophysical or cultural significance; administered by UNESCO

== By designated use ==
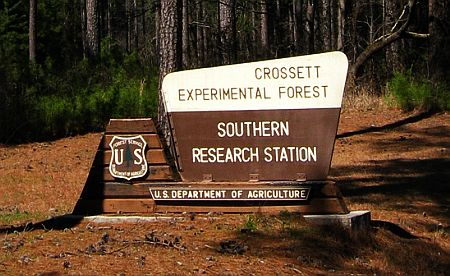
Crossett Experimental Forest, Arkansas, USA

- Dehesa - lands utilizing a particular agrosylvopastoral system in Spain and Portugal
- Demonstration forest
- Experimental forest - formal designation used by the United States Forest Service
- Intensive monitoring site - formal designation used by the United States Forest Service
- Long-term ecological research site
- Model forest - formal designation used by the Food and Agriculture Organization and the International Model Forest Network
- Nature reserve
- Private nonindustrial forest land - small, family owned, and timber-producing forest lands
- Production forest
- Protection forest - forests that mitigate or prevent the impact of a natural hazard; designation in France, Germany, Italy, Switzerland (Schutzwald) and elsewhere in Europe, particularly in mountainous areas (e.g. as a protection against avalanches)
- Research natural area - formal designation used by the United States Forest Service
- Teaching forest

== See also ==
- Conservation easement
- Forest garden, or food forest
- Forestry law
- Forest reserve (disambiguation)
- Indigenous and Community Conserved Area, IUCN
- Indigenous Protected Area, Australia
- IUCN protected area categories
- Land classifications within the New York Forest Preserve
- List of forests managed by the Forestry Commission
- Long Term Ecological Research Network
- National park
- Private protected area
- Protected area
- State park
- Urban forest
