= Private protected area =

A private protected area, also known as a private reserve, is not an official category within IUCN's Protected Area guidelines, but includes those protected areas that fall under geographical space that is privately owned, 'kept aside' for public benefit, and will be likely to fall into any one of the IUCN Protected Area Management Categories.

The IUCN defines a private protected area as “a land parcel of any size that is...":

1. "Predominantly managed for biodiversity conservation;
2. "Protected with or without formal government recognition; and
3. "Is owned or otherwise secured by individuals, communities, corporations, or non-governmental organisations.”

A Private Protected Area represents a private initiative towards preserving biodiversity, which indicates the importance of the involvement of individuals, corporations, and other private bodies in the understanding and maintenance of protected areas. In Eastern and Southern Africa, privately owned lands play an important role in conserving critical biodiversity. Private protected areas in Southern Africa alone protect millions of ecologically important areas, especially in critical buffer zones and corridor areas.

== See also ==
- Biodiversity hotspot
- Conservation biology
- Crisis ecoregion
- Ecoregion
- High-Biodiversity Wilderness Area
- Last of the Wild
- List of types of formally designated forests
- Man and the Biosphere Programme
- Private protected areas in Australia
- Private protected areas of India
- Privately owned public space
