= Last of the Wilds =

Last of the Wilds may refer to:

- "Erämaan viimeinen", a song by Nightwish
- Last of the Wilds, a novel in the Age of the Five trilogy by Trudi Canavan

== See also ==
- Last of the Wild, a Wildlife Conservation Society initiative
