= Wildlife Conservation Society =

Conservation organization in New York City

- Logo used since 2015
- Abbreviation: WCS
- Formation: April 26, 1895; 131 years ago (as New York Zoological Society)
- Founders: Andrew H. Green; Henry F. Osborn; Madison Grant
- Type: 501(c)(3) non-profit organization
- Purpose: Species conservation; Conservation; Ecology
- Headquarters: Bronx Zoo; The Bronx, New York City, United States
- Region served: Worldwide
- Chair: Alejandro Santo Domingo
- Vice chair: Hamilton E. James
- Key people: Robb Menzi (Interim President and Chief Executive Officer)
- Staff: 3,700
- Website: www.wcs.org
- Formerly called: New York Zoölogical Society (1895–1993)

The Wildlife Conservation Society (WCS) is a global 501(c)(3) non-governmental organization, headquartered at the Bronx Zoo in New York City, with a mission to save "wildlife and wild places across the globe". Founded in 1895 as the New York Zoölogical Society (NYZS), the global conservation organization is, as of July 1, 2025, led by President and CEO Adam Falk. WCS manages four New York City wildlife parks in addition to the Bronx Zoo: the Central Park Zoo, New York Aquarium, Prospect Park Zoo, and Queens Zoo. Together, these parks receive 4 million visitors per year. All these facilities are accredited by the Association of Zoos and Aquariums (AZA). WCS has a global program doing conservation work on the ground in more than 50 countries.

== History ==
=== Founding ===
Tour through Bronx Zoo, 1950

The Wildlife Conservation Society was originally chartered by the government of the State of New York, on April 26, 1895. Then known as the New York Zoölogical Society, the organization embraced a mandate to advance native wildlife conservation, promote the study of zoology, and create a first-class zoological park that would be free to the public; its name was changed to the Wildlife Conservation Society in 1993. Andrew H. Green was the first president of the society but was replaced by Levi P Morton after Green resigned due to declining health. Henry Fairfield Osborn, who was the curator of the American Museum of Natural History and the founder of the American Eugenics Society, was Morton's successor. Madison Grant, popular eugenicist and author of The Passing of The Great Race, acted as the society's secretary and the chairman of the executive committee. William Temple Hornaday operated as the founding Director and General Curator of the park itself. Together, these leaders wrote hundreds of works promoting preservationist values. According to environmental historian Miles A. Powell, their writings and arguments were foundational for conservation but partially motivated by racial discrimination, hyper masculinity, and an association between protecting the nation's wildlife and protecting the nation's white population.

Other notable figures involved in the Society's creation include George Bird Grinnell, founder of the Audubon Society and editor of Forest and Stream magazine, and members of the Boone and Crockett Club.

The Bronx Zoo (formerly the New York Zoological Park) was designed along the lines of other cultural institutions in New York City, such as the American Museum of Natural History. The city provided the land for the new zoo and some funding for buildings and annual operating costs. WCS raised most of the funds for construction and operations from private donors, and selected the scientific and administrative personnel. Hornaday's tenure was very significant for conservation, but he encountered controversy after the exhibiting Ota Benga, a Mbuti (Congo pygmy) man.

=== Work ===
In the late nineteenth century William Temple Hornaday, then director of the New York Zoological Park (now the Bronx Zoo), carried out a direct-mail survey of wildlife conditions through the United States and publicized the decline of birds and mammals in the organization's annual reports. He was a prolific writer who published The Extermination of the American Bison and Our Vanishing Wildlife: Its Extermination and Preservation, among many other texts. Our Vanishing Wildlife, in particular, revealed an association between species extinction and the decline of the white race in America.

In 1897, Hornaday hired field researcher Andrew J. Stone to survey the condition of wildlife in the territory of Alaska. On the basis of these studies, Hornaday led the campaign for new laws to protect the wildlife there and the United States as a whole. In 1901, a small herd of American Bison were gathered in a 20-acre meadow just off what is now the Pelham Parkway roadway. Starting in 1905, Hornaday led a national campaign to reintroduce the almost extinct bison to government sponsored refuges. Hornaday, Theodore Roosevelt and others formed the American Bison Society in 1905. The Bronx Zoo sent 15 bison to Wichita Reserve in 1907 and additional bison in later years. The saving of this uniquely American symbol is one of the great success stories in the history of wildlife conservation. Hornaday campaigned for wildlife protection throughout his thirty years as director of the Bronx Zoo. Beginning in 1906, Hornaday featured Ota Benga, a member of the Mbuti from the Congo, in a zoo exhibit. In July 2020, the Wildlife Conservation Society apologized.

Madison Grant and Osborn worked together with John C. Merriam, another eugenics supporter, in 1918 to form the Save-The-Redwoods-League. Together, they succeeded in convincing legislators to preserve many redwoods by comparing the trees to a race in danger. Local communities sometimes saw the attitudes of Grant, Osborn, and Hornaday as being elitist compared to those of poorer citizens and nonwhite citizens.

William Beebe, the first curator of birds at the Bronx Zoo, began a program of field research soon after the Bronx Zoo opened. His research on wild pheasants took him to Asia from 1908 to 1911 and resulted in a series of books on the birds. Beebe's field work also resulted in the creation of the Society's Department of Tropical Research, which Beebe directed from 1922 until his retirement in 1948. From 1930 to 1934, off of the coast of Bermuda, Beebe conducted research in an undersea vessel called the bathysphere. The vessel made thirty-five dives in total, taking him half a mile deep and along the ocean floor. During the dives, Beebe made observations on bioluminescent fish, as well as identifying several new species. This expedition was significant, as it was the first time humans observed the bottom of the deep sea and its creatures in their natural habitat. The bathysphere is currently displayed at the New York Aquarium.

During the World War II era, Henry Fairfield Osborn, Jr was elected president of the NYZS and Laurance Rockefeller was elected as executive committee chairman. A best-selling writer on conservation and son of WCS founder Henry Fairfield Osborn, Osborn embraced changes that represented new thinking within the organization. Guests were allowed to bring their own cameras into the Bronx Zoo. Beginning with the African Plains exhibit in 1941, animals were grouped by continents and ecosystems, rather than genetic orders and families.

After World War II, under the leadership of Osborn, the organization extended its programs in field biology and conservation. In 1946, WCS helped found the Jackson Hole Wildlife Park, which later became part of Grand Teton National Park in 1962. In the late 1950s, WCS began a series of wildlife surveys and projects in Kenya, Tanganyika (now Tanzania), Uganda, Ethiopia, Sudan, Burma, and the Malay peninsula. In 1959, it sponsored George Schaller's seminal study of mountain gorillas in Congo. Following that expedition, Schaller went on to become recognized as one of the world's preeminent field biologists, studying wildlife throughout Africa, Asia, and South America. Conservation activities continued to expand under the leadership of William G. Conway, who became director of the Bronx Zoo in 1962 and President of WCS in 1992. Active as a field biologist in Patagonia, Conway promoted a new vision of zoos as conservation organizations, which cooperated in breeding endangered species. He also designed new types of zoo exhibits aimed at teaching visitors about habitats that support wildlife, and encouraged the expansion of WCS's field programs.

During the 1960s and 1970s, the WCS took a leadership role in pioneering zoological exhibitions by seeking to recreate natural environments for the animals on display. Under the leadership of WCS director William G. Conway, the Bronx Zoo opened its World of Darkness for nocturnal species in 1969 and its World of Birds for avian displays in 1974. Eventually, New York City turned to WCS to renew and manage three city-run facilities in Manhattan, Brooklyn, and Queens. The redesigned Central Park Zoo opened in 1988, followed by the Queens Zoo in 1992 and the Prospect Park Zoo in 1993. From 1994 through 1996 Archie Carr III of WCS helped establish the Cockscomb Basin Wildlife Sanctuary in Belize, a reserve for endangered jaguars.

Today, WCS is working in nearly fifty nations around the world on more than five hundred projects designed to help protect both wildlife and the habitats in which they live. These projects range from the conservation of gorillas in Africa, tigers in Asia, and macaws in South America. In recent years, WCS has actively worked in conflict areas like Afghanistan, South Sudan, and Myanmar, where agreements on wildlife resources have contributed to peace and stability. More than 4 million people visit WCS's wildlife parks in New York City each year.

=== Digital projects ===
WCS has backed numerous digital projects, including the Mannahatta Project/Welikia Project, and the Last of the Wild. The Manhatta Project is an initiative on the historical ecology of the New York area in 1609, prior to colonization. The project illustrates the fifty-five different ecosystems that existed in the region through digital reconstructions. The Last of the Wild is a dataset showing different areas' relative Human Footprint, overlaid onto a map of the world. This data is used to map wild areas, as well as natural resource distribution.

=== International projects ===
Below are two examples of where WCS works around the world. WCS's global conservation approach is designed around landscapes and seascapes where "nature is strong: where ecological integrity is high."

==== Makira National Park ====
In 2001, in collaboration with the Madagascar Ministry of Environment and Forests, WCS launched a program to create the 372,470 hectare Makira Forest Protected Area. In 2017, WCS partnered with carbon-reduction platform Cool Effect to allow users to fund ongoing carbon-reduction projects directly supporting the Makira Natural Park.

==== Melanesia Program ====
The Wildlife Conservation Society's Melanesia Program focuses on conservation in the Melanesian region of Oceania. The program works specifically in Fiji, Papua New Guinea, Solomon Islands, and Vanuatu. Melanesia contains a high amount of biodiversity and is home to the world's largest and most elevated tropical islands. The program works both terrestrially and aquatically within the Bismarck Solomon Seas Ecoregion and the Bismarck Forest Corridor. It strives to combine community involvement and conservation rooted in science to resolve issues such as habitat loss, environmental degradation, overexploitation, and climate-change.

== Facilities ==
Name	Borough	Year Founded	Joined WCS	Size	Number of Species
Bronx Zoo	Bronx	1899	1899 (Founded by WCS)	265 acres (107 ha)	Approx. 650
Central Park Zoo	Manhattan	1864 (menagerie) 1934 (zoo)	1988	6.5 acres (2.6 ha)	163
New York Aquarium	Brooklyn	1896 (Battery Park location) 1957 (Coney Island location)	1902	14 acres (5.7 ha)	266
Prospect Park Zoo	Brooklyn	1890 (menagerie) 1935 (zoo)	1993	12 acres (4.9 ha)	176
Queens Zoo	Queens	1968	1988	18 acres (7.3 ha)	75+

== See also ==
- 21st Century Tiger
- Climate, Community & Biodiversity Alliance
- American Bison Society
- List of nature conservation organizations
