= High conservation value forest =

Forest management designation

High conservation value forest (HCVF) is a Forest Stewardship Council (FSC) forest management designation used to describe those forests who meet criteria defined by the FSC Principles and Criteria of Forest Stewardship.

Specifically, high conservation value forests are those that possess one or more of the following attributes:

1. forest areas containing globally, regionally or nationally significant: concentrations of biodiversity values (e.g. endemism, endangered species, refugia); and/or large landscape-level forests, contained within, or containing the management unit, where viable populations of most if not all naturally occurring species exist in natural patterns of distribution and abundance
2. forest areas that are in or contain rare, threatened or endangered ecosystems
3. forest areas that provide basic services of nature in critical situations (e.g. watershed protection, erosion control)
4. forest areas fundamental to meeting basic needs of local communities (e.g. subsistence, health) and/or critical to local communities' traditional cultural identity (areas of cultural, ecological, economic or religious significance identified in cooperation with such local communities).

== History ==
The denomination HCVF arose relatively recently in connection with the development of standards for the certification of forest management. The Forest Stewardship Council (FSC), an international accreditation association incorporated in 1995, first started considering the term high conservation values in 1996. FSC formally included the term high conservation value forests in the FSC Principles and Criteria of Forest Stewardship in January 1999.

A number of terms have been used somewhat interchangeably with the term HCVF. To a certain extent this arises from translation between languages and to a certain extent it arises from varying approaches at interpretation. The Spanish version uses the terms bosques con alto valor de conservación (forests with high value of conservation) and bosques con alto valor para la conservación (forests with high value for conservation).

As noted, the term HCVF arose following consideration of the term high conservation values; this usage led to the concept of forests having high conservation values and forests with high conservation values. Indeed, the term high conservation value is sometimes given its own acronym HCV; however, the FSC refers to an HCV as "attributes".

== Examples ==
Examples of the large landscape globally important forests include the Canada boreal forest and the remaining Amazon rainforest.

Examples of forest types which embrace rare or endangered species include the Dry deciduous forests of Madagascar the two Monterey Cypress of central coastal California and the Maritime Coast Range Ponderosa Pine forests of coastal California.

== HCVF Toolkits ==
Following the inclusion of the term in the FSC P&C in 1999, the FSC formed an Advisory Panel for the Implementation of high conservation value forests and the precautionary principle. This panel produced a number of consultation documents on how to identify HCVF, including indicators and verifiers. However, this consultation process was not finalized and FSC has yet to issue any specific guidance regarding HCVF1.

In lieu of formal guidance from FSC, there has been a proliferation of discussion on HCVF, led mainly by non-governmental organisations (NGOs). In particular, the need for more precise and practical guidance led to a 2001 initiative by the UK-based consulting company, Proforest Ltd. This initiative led to the production of a three-part High Conservation Value Toolkit (the ‘Global Toolkit’). The Global Toolkit offered a revised definition of HCVF as follows:

A High Conservation Value Forest is the area of forest required to maintain or enhance a High Conservation Value.

This definition provides a new approach to the zonation of HCVF as well as introduces the concept of ‘High Conservation Value’. The inclusion of the term ‘area of forest’ provide clarity that there may be instances where an HCVF zone might be restricted to part of a forest, while the FSC definition implied that the presence of one or more HCV attribute would render the whole forest as to be a ‘high conservation value forest’. Indeed, despite the provision for partial zonation, the Global Toolkit makes it clear that for the purposes of certification, any forest management unit containing even one small HCV is classified as a High Conservation Value Forest, which brings into play extra requirements for consultation, maintenance or enhancement, and annual monitoring. However, the additional burden is determined by the nature of the HCV and will affect only those parts of the forest, and those aspects of management, that are required for the maintenance or enhancement of the HCV (this procedure is explained in more detail in the section on Adaptive Management, below).

There are six recognized forms of High conservation values forests:

HCV1. Forest areas containing globally, regionally or nationally significant concentrations of biodiversity values (e.g. endemism, endangered species, refugia).
HCV2. Forest areas containing globally, regionally or nationally significant large landscape level forests, contained within, or containing the management unit, where viable populations of most if not all naturally occurring species exist in natural patterns of distribution and abundance.
HCV3. Forest areas that are in or contain rare, threatened or endangered ecosystems.
HCV4. Forest areas that provide basic services of nature in critical situations (e.g. watershed protection, erosion control).
HCV5. Forest areas fundamental to meeting basic needs of local communities (e.g. subsistence, health).
HCV6. Forest areas critical to local communities’ traditional cultural identity (areas of cultural, ecological, economic or religious significance identified in cooperation with such local communities).

The Global Toolkit has not been explicitly endorsed by the FSC but the revised ordering system appears to have gained widespread appeal and there is a recommendation for its use in FSC reports found in a footnote to an FSC reporting standard. The Global Toolkit was intentionally designed for a wide range of users beyond the FSC scheme. Indeed, in December 2005, the popularity of the HCV approach led to the formation of the HCV Resource Network which includes a broad platform of NGOs as well as the World Bank and the International Tropical Timber Organization (ITTO).

== High conservation value areas ==
The concept of a High conservation value forest has now been generalized and used by other certification schemes like the Roundtable on Sustainable Palm Oil (RSPO), the Better Cotton Initiative, the Sustainable Agriculture Network (SAN) and Bonsucro, among others. Consumer goods companies (mainly members of the Consumer Goods Forum) have also made independent commitments to protecting High Conservation Values in their supply chains.

The analogous six High Conservation Values are:

- HCV 1: Concentrations of biological diversity including endemic species, and rare, threatened or endangered species, that are significant at global, regional or national levels.
- HCV 2: Intact forest landscapes and large landscape-level ecosystems and ecosystem mosaics that are significant at global, regional or national levels, and that contain viable populations of the great majority of the naturally occurring species in natural patterns of distribution and abundance.
- HCV 3: Rare, threatened, or endangered ecosystems, habitats or refugia.
- HCV 4: Basic ecosystem services in critical situations, including protection of water catchments and control of erosion of vulnerable soils and slopes.
- HCV 5: Sites and resources fundamental for satisfying the basic necessities of local communities or indigenous peoples (for livelihoods, health, nutrition, water, etc...), identified through engagement with these communities or indigenous peoples.
- HCV 6: Sites, resources, habitats and landscapes of global or national cultural, archaeological or historical significance, and/or of critical cultural, ecological, economic or religious/sacred importance for the traditional cultures of local communities or indigenous peoples, identified through engagement with these local communities or indigenous peoples.

== See also ==
- Biodiversity hotspots
- Biological integrity
- Conservation priority
- Crisis ecoregion
- Ecological health
- Ecoregions
- High-Biodiversity Wilderness Areas
- High Conservation Value Areas
- Intact forest landscapes
- List of types of formally designated forests
