= Forestry =

Science and craft of managing woodlands

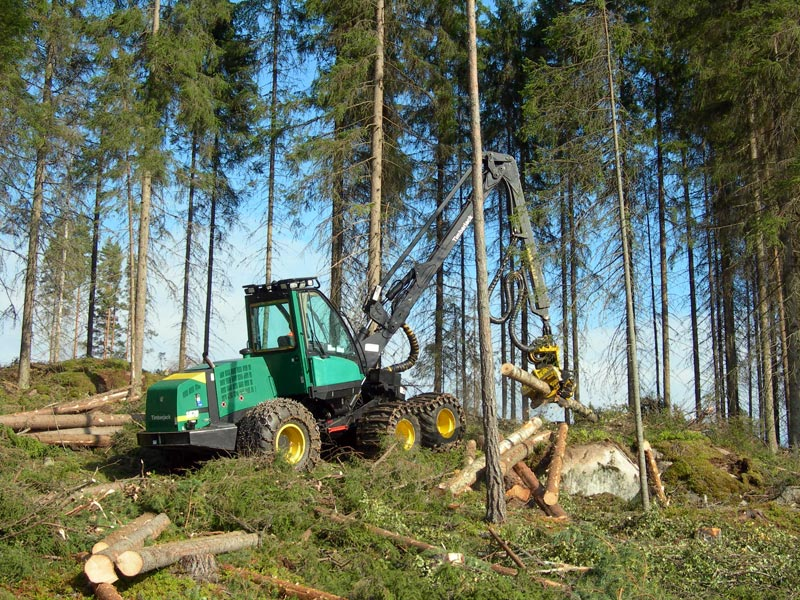
A Timberjack wheeled harvester stacking cut timber in Finland

Forestry is the science and craft of creating, managing, planting, using, conserving and repairing forests and woodlands for associated resources for human and environmental benefits. Forestry is practiced in plantations and natural stands. The science of forestry has elements that belong to the biological, physical, social, political and managerial sciences. Forest management plays an essential role in creating and modifying habitats, and affects ecosystem services provisioning. A practitioner of forestry is a forester.

Modern forestry generally embraces a broad range of concerns, in what is known as multiple-use management, including: the provision of timber, fuel wood, wildlife habitat, natural water quality management, recreation, landscape and community protection, employment, aesthetically appealing landscapes, biodiversity management, watershed management, erosion control, and preserving forests as "sinks" for carbon dioxide.

Forest ecosystems have come to be seen as the most important component of the biosphere, and forestry has emerged as a vital applied science, craft, and technology. The management of forests for timber production is known as silviculture. Although forestry is a broader concept, the two terms are often used synonymously.

All people depend to some extent upon forests and their biodiversity. Forestry is an important economic segment in various industrial countries, as forests provide more than 86 million green jobs and support the livelihoods of many more people. For example, in Germany, forests cover nearly a third of the land area, wood is the most important renewable resource, and forestry supports more than a million jobs and about €181 billion of value to the German economy each year.

Worldwide, an estimated 880 million people spend part of their time collecting firewood or producing charcoal, many of them women. Human populations tend to be low in areas of low-income countries with high forest cover and high forest biodiversity, but poverty rates in these areas tend to be high. Some 252 million people living in forests and savannahs have incomes of less than US$1.25 per day.

== Science ==
=== Forestry as a science ===
Over the past centuries, forestry was regarded as a separate science. With the rise of ecology and environmental science, there has been a reordering in the applied sciences. In line with this view, forestry is a primary land-use science comparable with agriculture. Under these headings, the fundamentals behind the management of natural forests comes by way of natural ecology. Forests or tree plantations, those whose primary purpose is the extraction of forest products, are planned and managed to utilize a mix of ecological and agroecological principles. In many regions of the world there is considerable conflict between forest practices and other societal priorities such as water quality, watershed preservation, sustainable fishing, conservation, and species preservation.

=== Dendrology and silviculture ===
Dendrology is a subset of botany; it is the scientific discipline that studies woody plants (trees, shrubs, and lianas), specifically, their taxonomic classifications. Silviculture on the other hand is the commercial practice of forest management, primarily for the production of timber.

=== Genetic diversity in forestry ===
The provenance of forest reproductive material used to plant forests has a great influence on how the trees develop, hence why it is important to use forest reproductive material of good quality and of high genetic diversity. Genetic diversity is the differences in DNA sequence between individuals as distinct from variation caused by environmental influences. The unique genetic composition of an individual (its genotype) will determine its performance (its phenotype) at a particular site. Genetic diversity is needed to maintain the vitality of forests and to provide resilience to pests and diseases. Genetic diversity also ensures that forest trees can survive, adapt and evolve under changing environmental conditions. Furthermore, genetic diversity is the foundation of biological diversity at species and ecosystem levels. Forest genetic resources are therefore important in forest management.

Genetic diversity in forests is threatened by forest fires, habitat fragmentation, pests and diseases, poor silvicultural practices and inappropriate use of forest reproductive material. About 98 million hectares of forest were affected by fire in 2015; this was mainly in the tropical domain, where fire burned about 4 percent of the total forest area in that year. More than two-thirds of the total forest area affected was in Africa and South America. Insects, diseases and severe weather events damaged about 40 million hectares of forests in 2015, mainly in the temperate and boreal domains. The marginal populations of many tree species are facing new threats due to the effects of climate change. Most countries in Europe have recommendations or guidelines for selecting species and provenances that can be used in a given site or zone.

== Forest management ==
Forest management is the branch of forestry concerned with the administration and running of commercial forests. It addresses silviculture, forest protection, and regulation. Its goals include management for timber, aesthetics, recreation, urban values, watershed management, wildlife, inland and nearshore fisheries, wood products, plant genetic resources, and other forest resource values. Economic and policy decision-making tends to prioritise market-based benefits such as timber production which has led to recent frameworks emphasising that forest management must account for non-market ecosystem services such as cultural, social, and ecological functions which are often underrepresented.

For example, forest management often involves addressing wildlife-forest interactions. Deer populations limit forest regeneration and alter species composition by grazing on young saplings. Forest management studies and accounts for these interactions, such as by using understory plants as indicator species to estimate deer browsing pressure and to predict long-term impacts on forest health.

== Urban forestry ==
Urban forestry is the care and management of single trees and tree populations in urban settings for the purpose of improving the urban environment. Urban forestry involves both planning and management, including the programming of care and maintenance operations of the urban forest.

== Forestry education ==
Forestry education includes training in general biology, ecology, botany, genetics, soil science, climatology, hydrology, economics and forest management. Education in the basics of sociology and political science is often considered an advantage. Professional skills in conflict resolution and communication are also important in training programs. In the United States, postsecondary forestry education leading to a Bachelor's degree or Master's degree is accredited by the Society of American Foresters. In Canada the Canadian Institute of Forestry awards silver rings to graduates from accredited university BSc programs, as well as college and technical programs. The International Union of Forest Research Organizations is the international organization that coordinates forest science efforts worldwide.

== History ==
The first major works about forestry in the English language included Roger Taverner's Booke of Survey (1565), John Manwood's A Brefe Collection of the Lawes of the Forrest (1592) and John Evelyn's Sylva (1662).

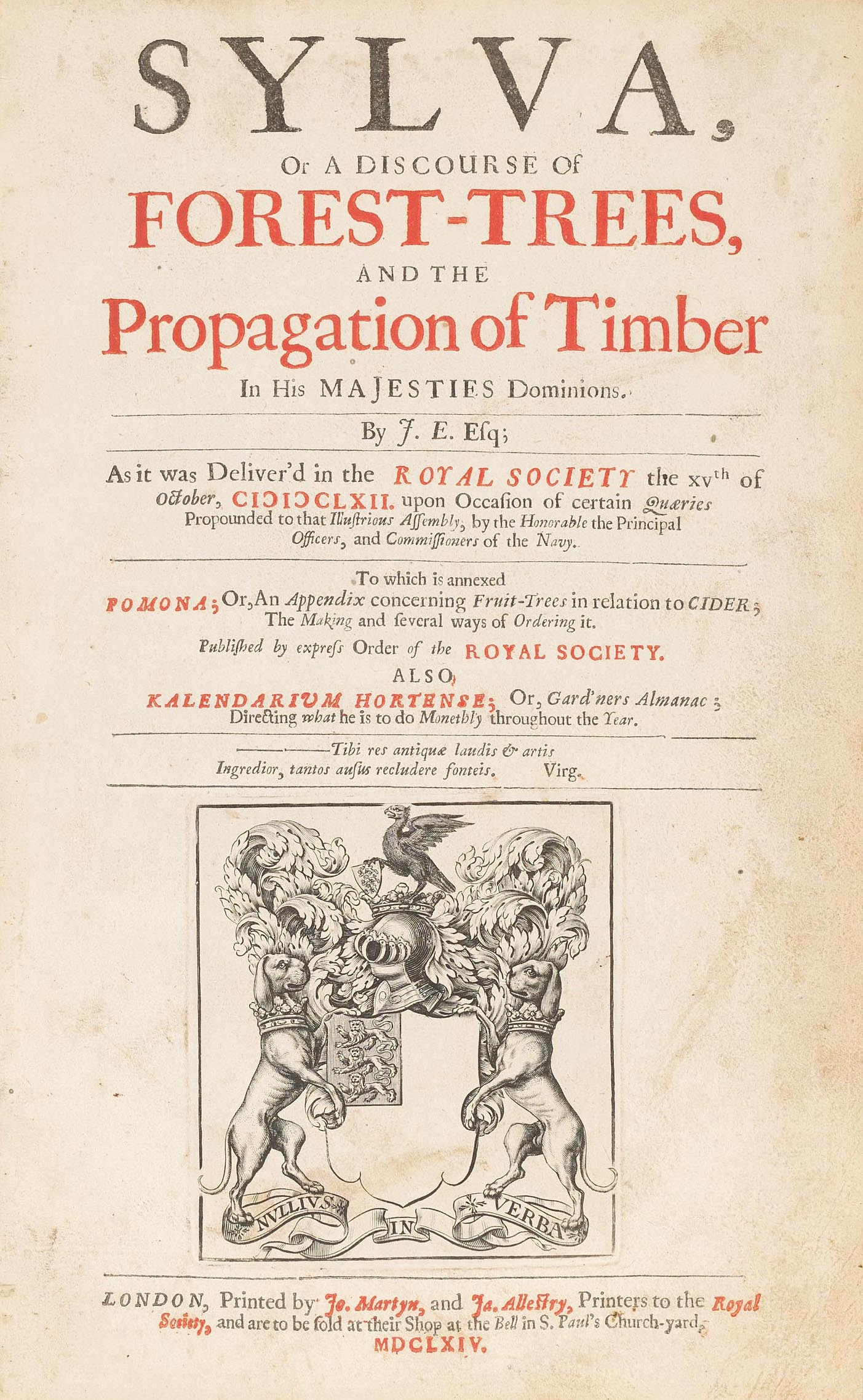
The first book edition of John Evelyn's Sylva, 1662

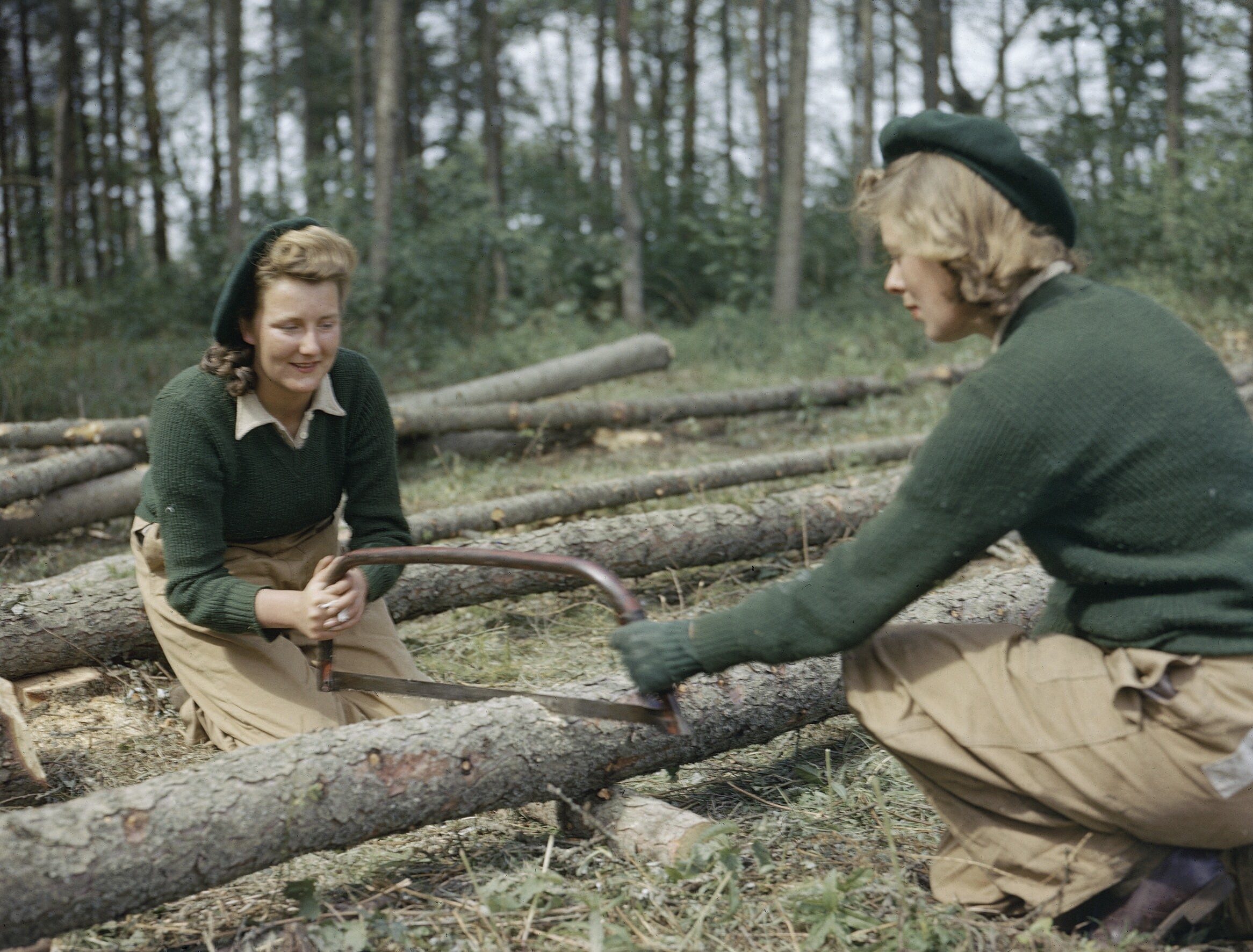
Women of the Land Army cutting felled logs during World War II

== Occupational health and safety hazards ==
=== Physical hazards ===
Physical hazard is a major occupational safety concern for forestry workers, because their jobs often involve heavy machinery, harsh environment, difficult terrain, and physically demanding work. The FAO identifies extreme temperatures, noise, vibration, and slippery or uneven terrain as major safety concerns. Physical hazard exposures are associated with wood-logging operations, particularly hazards related to operating forestry machinery. An evaluation of wild-land firefighters found high noise exposures and hand-transmitted vibration from chainsaw use, with more than 70% of workers reporting symptoms potentially consistent with hand-arm vibration syndrome.

Forestry workers' common experience in respiratory hazards is a concern, including exposure to carbon monoxide and wood dust. Carbon monoxide can be produced by the gasoline-powered engines used with forestry equipment. This can be dangerous because workers may not recognize an exposure until symptoms develop. Another concern is exposure to wood dust, an IARC group 1 carcinogen which can irritate the eyes, nose, throat, and respiratory system and has been associated with asthma, respiratory hypersensitivity, and certain cancers. Although full-shift airway exposures were typically below the legal occupational limits, workers occasionally experienced CO concentrations or wood dust beyond the mark.

Although there has been certain hazard identification and safety solution development surrounding physical hazards in the forestry industry, a 'research-to-progress' gap often exists, meaning that solutions often do not reach widespread adoption.

=== Accidental injury ===
An Occupational Accident occurs while workers are carrying out work related duties, resulting in death, injury, or harm, and damage or disruption to objects and systems. Accidents in professional forestry operations worldwide are estimated to exceed 170,000 per year.

Hazardous demands of forestry include motor-manual forest harvesting/the use of chainsaw in felling, the use of a skidder, sharp, powered tools, heavy loads, and heavy machinery. Awkward positions combined with long hours and rugged terrain make for added exposure. Occupational accidents tend to favour manual workers and logging truck drivers who experience higher risk of suffering an OA than contractors.

Logging is an inherently dangerous occupation, with a fatality rate 30 times higher than all other U.S. occupations. A 1992 Bureau of Labor Statistics report influenced the CDC to revise regulations of logging workers. The report highlighted the high fatality rate, injury rate, non-fatal injury and illness cases. In response, NIOSH issued a formal Alert: NIOSH Alert: Request for Assistance in Preventing Injuries and Deaths of Loggers. The CDC used the Bureau of Labor Statistics's report data to form specific initiatives to advocate for logging safety changes. The regulations are as follows: 1. Additional job and first-aid training for workers. 2. Expanded uses and types of personal protective equipment. 3. More stringent requirements for the use of rollover and falling-object protective structures. 4. Comprehensive manual felling procedures (including proper techniques for undercuts and back cuts to prevent tree from prematurely twisting off the stump).

Occupational accidents that cause injury are common amongst forestry workers. Specific regulations reflect change in safety precautions in an unchanging dangerous work environment.

=== Environmental hazards ===
Forestry workers are exposed to numerous environmental hazards, as a significant amount of the work is completed outdoors in forested areas. These hazards may be climatic, including extreme weather, wildfires, and natural disasters, or biological, including wildlife interactions and disease exposure. Additionally, many of these hazards are exacerbated by climate change; as climate change is increasing the frequency and severity of extreme weather events, forestry workers may face physiological impacts of extreme heat or cold exposure, including heat stress and dehydration, or reduced blood flow and muscle dexterity. Climate change is also increasing the frequency of wildfire events. For outdoor workers, including foresters, inhaling wildfire smoke may cause harm to the respiratory system. Individuals inhaling wildfire smoke may be exposed to acrolein, benzene, formaldehyde, particulate matter, and carbon monoxide. Forestry workers may be exposed to levels of these pollutants that exceed industrial hygiene standards for maximum exposure without adverse health effects.

Forests are home to many insects and wild animals, and interactions with wildlife may be hazardous for forestry workers. Forestry workers may interact with large mammals, including bears and wild cats, venomous snakes, or smaller rodents. Bites or scratches from wildlife may expose forestry workers to disease, in addition to physical harm. Climate change is also driving range shifts in many animal species, which may increase human-animal interactions in forests and expose foresters to new hazards. In addition, forestry workers may be subject to rhus dermatitis and insect stings and bites. Because of these interactions, forestry workers are at higher risk of contracting zoonotic diseases, including tularemia, leptospirosis, and Lyme disease.

Most environmental hazards for forestry workers are unable to be controlled by elimination, substitution, or engineering controls, without impacting their ability to accomplish their work. Therefore, administrative controls and personal protective equipment should be implemented for forestry workers to reduce exposure to these hazards.

=== Chemical hazards ===
Occupational hazards faced by forestry workers include chemicals from pesticides and herbicides used in silviculture, as well as solvents and emissions. The Food and Agriculture Organization occupational health and safety guidelines for forestry stress the importance of safety standards and chemical-handling knowledge to mitigate workplace risks. Investigations by the National Institute for Occupational Safety and Health, underscore the complexity of mixed chemical exposures, inadequate use of personal protective equipment, and the need for systematic environmental monitoring. In addition to acute toxicological effects, chronic low-level chemical exposures present long-term health risks.

Forestry workers, particularly timber markers and cruisers, are frequently exposed to chemicals in tree-marking paints and related solvents. Extended skin contact with solvent residues during handling, container disposal, or improper equipment cleaning further elevates the risk of contact dermatitis and dermal chemical absorption. Forestry guidelines recommend replacing solvent-based aerosols with water-based formulations, utilizing specialized puncture systems for aerosol cans, requiring chemical-resistant gloves, and prohibiting hazardous cleanup practices such as applying gasoline or industrial solvents directly to the skin.

== Silvologists ==
- Gabriel Hemery
- Heinrich Cotta

== See also ==
- Agroforestry
- Close to nature forestry
- Community forestry
- List of forest research institutes
- List of forestry journals
- List of historic journals of forestry
- List of national forests of the United States
- Non-timber forest product
- Nonindustrial private forests
