= Schönwald =

Schönwald may refer to:

- Schönwald im Schwarzwald, Baden-Württemberg, Germany
- Schönwald, Bavaria, Germany
- Schönwald, Brandenburg (also Schönwalde), Germany
- German name of Krásný Les (Karlovy Vary District), Czech Republic
- German name of Šumvald, Czech Republic

== See also ==
- Schonwald
- Schönwalde (disambiguation)
- Schönewalde, town in the Elbe-Elster district, in southwestern Brandenburg, Germany
