= Private forest =

A private forest (also private woodland or private wood) is a forest that is not owned by municipal authorities (such as a corporate forest), church authorities or the state (e.g. a state forest or national forest). It can refer to woodland owned by a natural or juridical person or a partnership.It is the forest which is planted, nurtured or conserved in any private land.

According to the Food and Agriculture Organization of the United Nations, private forests are defined as forests owned by individuals, families, communities, private co-operatives, corporations and other business entities, religious and private educational institutions, pension or investment funds, NGOs, nature conservation associations and other private institutions.

Currently, 22 percent [of the world’s forests] are privately owned.

Globally, the share of publicly owned forests has decreased since 1990 and the area of forest under private ownership has increased.

== Categories ==
In forestry terms, private forest may be divided into various sub-categories. For example, in Germany private forest is categorised by size as follows:

- Smallest private forest (Kleinstprivatwald): below 5 hectares
- Small private forest (Kleinprivatwald): 5 - 200 hectares
- Medium private forest (Mittlerer Privatwald): 200 - 1,000 hectares
- Large private forest (Großprivatwald): over 1,000 hectares which only represents about 6 percent of the forest area of the old (West German) federal states. In the former East Germany the Evangelical churches, by contrast, still own over 30,000 hectares of private forest and an important private forestry authority with its own uniform and badges.

== Emergence ==
Private forests arise for a variety of reasons. In Europe:

- Large private forest estates arose predominantly because mediatised territorial lordships,(e. g. those of princely families) although stripped of their sovereignty, were allowed to keep almost all of their forest estates.
  For example, the forest estate of the House of Thurn and Taxis, the largest forest in Germany owned by a private person with 28,000 hectares (according to a 2012 report; according to their own 2010 report: after a major sale to Adolf Merckle still had 20,000 hectares). In Austria, the almost equally large Mayr-Melnhof estate but success of a middle-class merchant dynasty. The Habsburg estates were forcibly acquired and turned into federal forests.
- Middle private forests arose (and still arise) either as a result of the division of large private forests (e. g. through inheritance division or sale), but primarily through the sale of forests
  Examples here are the nine federal states of Germany: in 1945-49 in the wake of the land reforms in East Germany, large landowners were stripped of their estates in the Soviet Zone of Occupation and the land was given to refugees and former farmers in a move known as Junkerland in Bauernhand ("princes' land into farmers' hands"). After the fall of the Berlin Wall it was decided, not the give the private forests in East Germany back to their original owners, but with the help of a trust company (Treuhandgesellschaft) to transfer them to new private owners. This resulted in plots of private land between 200 and 1,000 hectares in area.
- Small private forests are mostly areas of farm woodland. In the 19th century the hitherto common land was divided up and given to the entitled farmers. In order to ensure a sensible division of the woodland the farmers were not usually given one plot, but several plots of varying soil quality and tillering. In regions where gavelkind applied (South Germany, Austria), the sometimes very small plots were further divided, which led to a fragmentation of the forests and makes management today impossible in places.

== Distribution ==
Forest ownership, by region, 2015

Of the regions, Oceania, North and Central America and South America have the highest proportions of private forests.

=== Europe ===
==== European Union ====
In the European Union (EU-28) 42% of the area is covered by forest. 60% of the European forest area is private. The share of private forest area is ranging from 13% in Bulgaria up to 98% in Portugal. Almost all European private forest is small holdings, only 1% of European private forest holdings have units over 50 ha.

==== Austria ====
Forest cover approximately 40.000 km² which represent 48% of Austria. 82% of the forest area is in private ownership. Most private forest owner held small forest (under 200 hectare). Traditionally, private forest owner in Austria were predominantly farmers and forest were used to cover the personal needs of wood products and occasionally to finance larger investments. Due to societal change and the associated urbanization a new group of “remote urban forest owners” have emerged. These are owners of small-scale forest, who predominately have inherited but do not manage or actively cultivate their forest. Meanwhile one third of private forest owners belong to this new group.

==== Catalonia (North-East Spain) ====
Around two thirds of total area of Catalonia (32,108 km^{2}) is covered by forests (2,050,000 ha) and 75% of this surface are private forests. Forests ownership is scattered and with a large proportion of small properties (221,779 private states, probably more than 260,000 forest owners). The mean surface of the forest estates of Catalonia is 6.7 ha. Moreover, the 52 % of the forest estates do not exceed 1 ha, even they represent just the 2.8% of the private forest area. Just 4.75 % of the properties have more than 25 ha, although they represent the 67.25% of the global private forests and only 1.2 % of private properties are bigger than 100 ha (represent 41.5% of the total private forest area).

Some forest states are also linked to agriculture activities (actually, decreasing), apart from forest activities. Ownership, traditionally, has been passed from parents to their children. Family heritage is estimated to account for 60% of the transmissions.

There is no any concrete definition of small scale forest owners, the definition depends on many aspects. However, in Catalonia, law defines as minimum forest unit, 25 ha

==== Germany ====
Germany has around 11.4 million hectares of woodland of which 48.0 percent is in private ownership. The state of North Rhine-Westphalia has the greatest proportion of private forest (66.8%); Hesse has the lowest proportion (24.5%). In Germany there are just under 2 million private forest owners. The average size of German private woods is 3 hectares. Only 13% of private woods are over 1,000 hectares in area; 50% of the area is made of up small private forests of up to 20 hectares in area and they account for 98% of the owners. The DBU Naturerbe, with around 60,000 ha, is the largest private forest owner in Germany. Of the churches in Germany, around 150,000 ha of forest is divided between 6,500 legal owners (parishes, abbeys, foundations, bishoprics). Even though the churches are mostly corporate bodies, the woodlands they own are considered to be private forests.

Federal state	Private forests up to 20 ha	Private forests over 20 to 50 ha	Private forests over 50 to 100 ha	Private forests over 100 to 200 ha	Private forests over 200 to 500 ha	Private forests over 500 to 1,000 ha	Private forests over 1,000 ha	Private forests total
Baden-Württemberg	242,232 ha	50,628 ha	28,516 ha	19,210 ha	20,611 ha	17,510 ha	114,162 ha	492,869 ha
Bavaria	950,045 ha	159,527 ha	69,758 ha	49,359 ha	61,725 ha	49,726 ha	110,839 ha	1,450,979 ha
Brandenburg + Berlin	254,678 ha	75,021 ha	35,536 ha	31,193 ha	69,493 ha	70,678 ha	102,661 ha	668,479 ha
Hamburg + Bremen	6,725 ha	-	791 ha	-	-	-	-	7,516 ha
Hesse	67,983 ha	5,999 ha	9,998 ha	18,395 ha	26,793 ha	19,595 ha	69,983 ha	218,746 ha
Mecklenburg-Vorpommern	64,575 ha	16,591 ha	17,286 ha	28,115 ha	32,188 ha	19,968 ha	15,200 ha	220,646 ha
Lower Saxony	314,954 ha	98,615 ha	74,322 ha	66,339 ha	67,928 ha	29,790 ha	54,875 ha	706,823 ha
North Rhine-Westphalia	239,010 ha	59,255 ha	48,916 ha	37,780 ha	62,437 ha	37,383 ha	122,885 ha	607,666 ha
Rhineland-Palatinate	154,401 ha	5,475 ha	6,968 ha	11,349 ha	17,322 ha	11,448 ha	17.322 ha	224,284 ha
Saarland	20,370 ha	783 ha	1,175 ha	783 ha	5,484 ha	783 ha	-	29,380 ha
Saxony	127,371 ha	11,362 ha	10,166 ha	9,966 ha	25,913 ha	16,544 ha	29,102 ha	240,790 ha
Saxony-Anhalt	121,064 ha	27,102 ha	12,555 ha	16,740 ha	29,394 ha	32,782 ha	25,608 ha	289,257 ha
Schleswig-Holstein	39,788 ha	4,687 ha	4,986 ha	6,881 ha	8,775 ha	9,972 ha	13,961 ha	89,050 ha
Thuringia	130,193 ha	13,984 ha	12,555 ha	12,799 ha	14,534 ha	12,607 ha	27,534 ha	239,193 ha
Germany total	2,733.389 ha	529,029 ha	333,526 ha	308,910 ha	442,597 ha	328,787 ha	704,132 ha	5,485,679 ha

- including private forest of unknown category

==== Liechtenstein ====
In Liechtenstein around 43% or 6,865 hectares of the country is wooded. Of that, 8% is in private hands.

==== Slovakia ====
In Slovakia over 45.1% (2.221 million ha) of total area is covered by forests. In 2017, the state owned 769 thousand ha of forest land, or 39.5% of its total area. The state forest enterprises managed 1.01 million ha of forest land, or 52.4% of its total area. The remaining area of forest land was managed by non-state forest enterprises which own and manage private, municipal, community and church forests as well as forests of agricultural cooperatives. In private ownership is 214 thousand ha of forests. According to Forestry code the owner of a forest plot or several fragmented forest plots whose aggregate area within forest unit does not exceed 50 hectares is defined as a small forest owner.

==== Sweden ====
Sweden is located in the boreal region and forests cover about half of Sweden’s habitable land area. About 80% of the forest land consists of Scots pine, Norway spruce and birch. The standing volume was estimated to 3.5 billion m^{3} in 2018, and the annual increment exceeds yearly gross felling, and has done so since the 1950s. In 2018, almost half (48%) of the productive 23.7 million hectare productive forest land was owned by about 330,000 (non-industrial) private forest owners, approximately 24% is owned by private companies, 13% was owned by state companies and the remaining 15% by other private (e.g. foundations) and public owners. The forest land was divided into 234,093 forest holdings, of which 228,350 were owned by private forest owners. Private companies and the state had larger holdings than private forest owners. In 2012, the average age of private forest owners was 57 years, and 39% of the owners were women. The average holding size for private owners was 34.4 hectares, but 16% of the private owners had forest holdings larger than 100 hectares. Almost a third of the owners, 31%, lived in another municipality than their holdings was located in, and the average distance between the owners place of residence and his/her forest holding increased from 37.1 km in 1990 to 58.3 km in 2010. Although the number of owners living over 90 km from their holding has increased, the median distance of 2.2 km indicates that half of the owners still live within walking distance from their holding.

==== Switzerland ====
In Switzerland the forests cover 1.3 million hectare and 30 percentage of the forest area is private. 97% of the 250.000 forest owners are private with an average holding of 1.42 hectare.

== Sources ==
This article incorporates text from a free content work. Licensed under CC BY-SA 3.0 (license statement/permission). Text taken from Global Forest Resources Assessment 2020 Key findings, FAO, FAO.

== Literature ==
- Bundesministerium für Ernährung und Landwirtschaft (BMEL, publ.): Der Wald in Deutschland – Ausgewählte Ergebnisse der dritten Bundeswaldinventur. Berlin, 2014. (Online version, pdf; 5 MB)
- Hans Leibundgut: Waldbau im Privatwald. Anregungen und Hinweise zu erfolgreicher Waldpflege für den Waldbesitzer. Haupt, Bern/ Stuttgart, 1989, ISBN 3-258-04082-6.
- Jochen Berlit: Betriebskonzept zur Bewirtschaftung eines Privatwaldes. (= Taxationspraxis: F, Forstwirtschaft. Band 14). Sachverständigen-Kuratorium für Landwirtschaft, Forstwirtschaft, Gartenbau, Landespflege, Weinbau, Binnenfischerei, Pferdehaltung. SVK-Verlag, Erndtebrück, 1996, ISBN 3-89061-106-0.
- Ulrich Schraml, Karl-Reinhard Volz (eds.): Urbane Waldbesitzer. Studien zur Beratung und Betreuung im nichtbäuerlichen Kleinprivatwald. (= Freiburger Schriften zur Forst- und Umweltpolitik. Vol. 1). Kessel, Remagen-Oberwinter, 2003, ISBN 3-935638-27-2.
- Karl-Reinhard Volz: Wem gehört eigentlich der Wald? In: er Bürger im Staat. 1, 2001, pp. 51ff. Der deutsche Wald. (Online-Version; pdf; 3.6 MB)
