= Forest reserve (disambiguation) =

Forest reserve(s) may refer to:

- Nature reserves made up in part or whole of forests

It may also refer to:

- Forest Reserve Act of 1891, United States
- Headwaters Forest Reserve, the only forest reserve in the United States
- Recreational Forest Reserve of Pinhal da Paz, Azores
- Reserved forests and protected forests of India

Or to:

- Nottingham Forest F.C. Under-21s Squad and Academy, West Bridgford, Nottinghamshire, England

== See also ==
- List of countries by forest area
- List of types of formally designated forests
- Biosphere reserve
- Protected area
