= Bannwald =

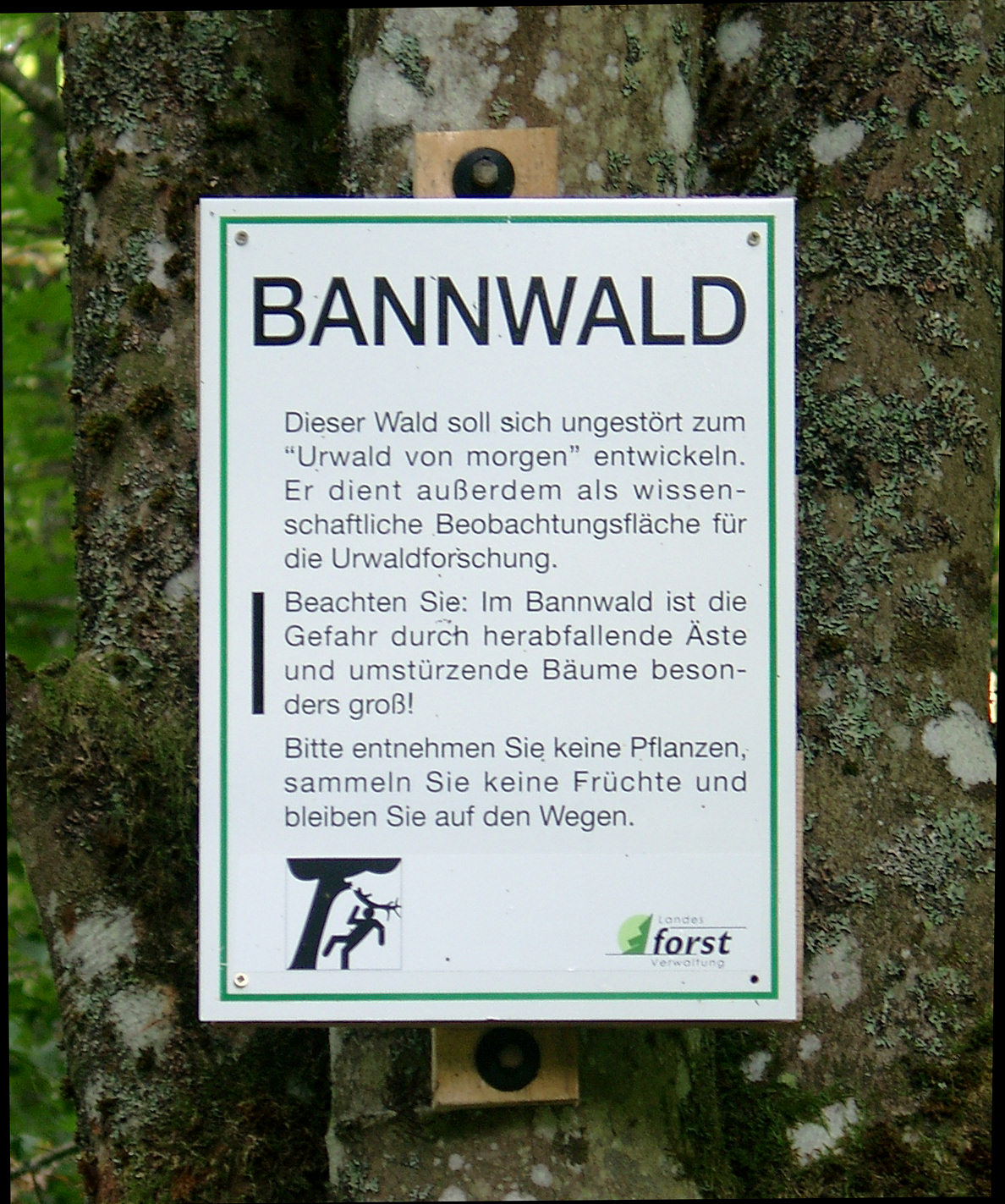
Information sign

Bannwald (German: [ˈbanˌvalt]) is a German word used in parts of Germany and Austria to designate an area of protected forest. Its precise meaning has varied by location and over time.

== Etymology ==
The word Bannwald is a German compound of Bann (cognate with English ban) and Wald (forest or wood). Bann has many historical meanings in German, one of which refers to an area controlled by and set aside for the use of a landowner in medieval times (comparable to the forests subject to the royal ban in Anglo-Saxon England). A Bannwald was a forest where a nobleman had the prerogative to make use of it and the creatures in it. For most of the time it was aimed to prevent people from collecting fire wood, harvesting young trees for posts, or collecting nuts and berries, farmers would bring in pigs temporarily to feed on acorns. A royal ban forest existed at Dreieich for a very long period, and its charter was one of the most primitive. The (obsolete) French literal equivalent bambois (also: banbois) is still the toponym of local forests in areas which once were part of the former Holy Roman Empire.

In modern times, the term Bannwald is, in a certain sense, an archaic word which has been revived as a specific term for forests under various types of protection.

== Scope ==
The term is generally used with a rather broad meaning:

- Protection forest, for the protection against avalanches, rockfall, mudflow, or flooding
- Forest reserve, forest areas protected for reasons of nature conservation and environmental protection
- Recreational forest, sometimes also as recreation area

Depending on the respective forest act, there may be an overlapping or difference in meaning between the terms banned forest and protection forest.

== Function ==
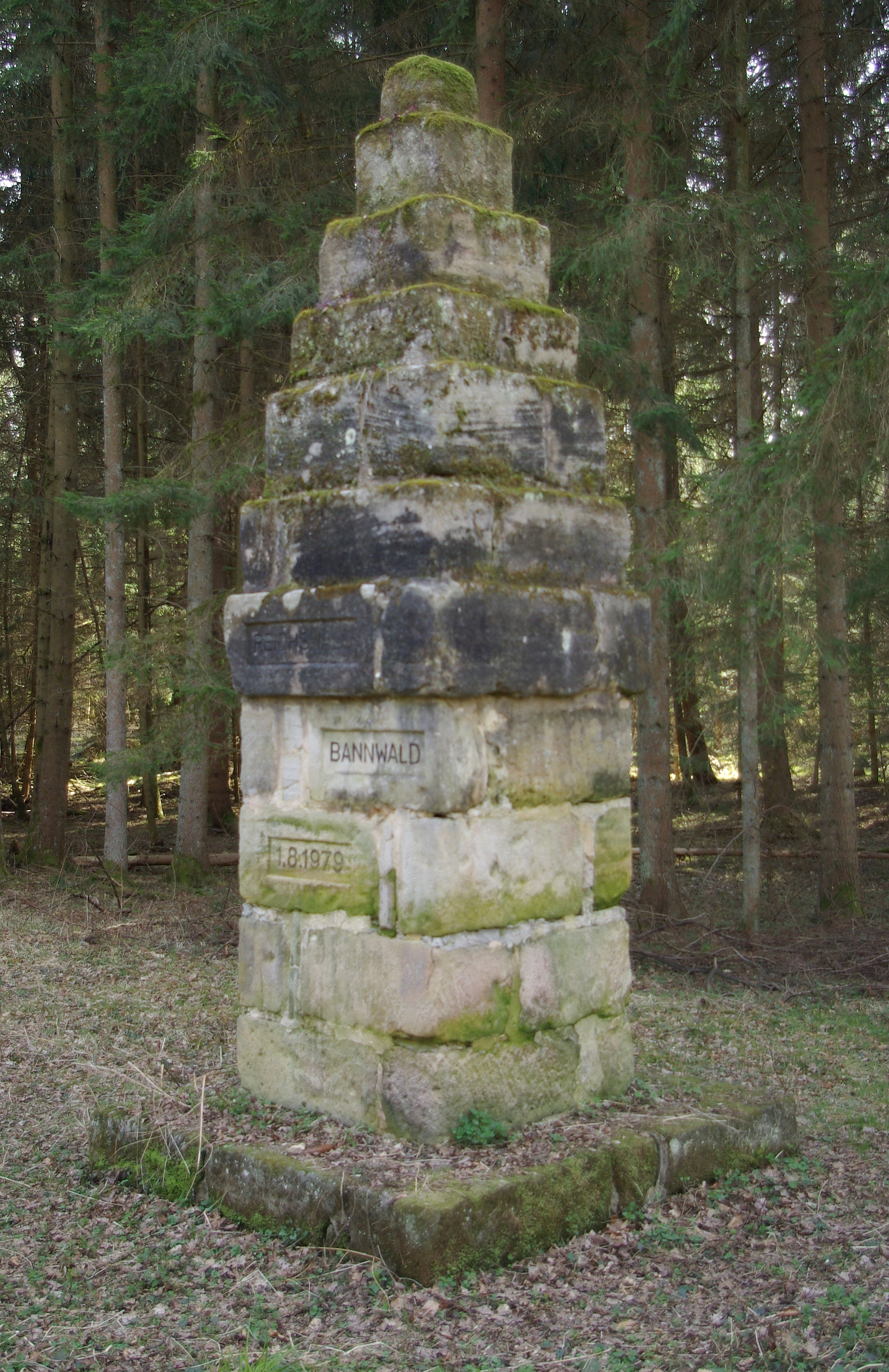
Banned forest monument in the imperial forest of Nuremberg

Silvicultural use is still permitted and in the case of protection forests it is even welcome (except in Baden-Württemberg). However, it is prohibited in the core zones of nature reserves. Forestal exclusion zones (temporarily restricted forest areas) subject to hunting prohibitions or restrictions, or temporary hunting grounds or game preserves (areas closed during a hunting season or breeding and upbringing season) are not classified as banned forests.

== History ==
The term Bann dates back to the Middle Ages. At that time a Bannwald referred to a forest area where the respective territorial lord had the exclusive right to use the forest (forest privilege). Originally this applied only to hunting (hunting privilege) and fishing, however, later it was extended to the complete use of the forest. In the mountain valleys of Switzerland banned forests had the function to protect against avalanches and also to provide sufficient timber for fencing torrents. Corresponding decrees from the 14th century deal with protection against avalanches, rockfalls and flooding. The concept of Bannwald plays an important part in Ludwig Ganghofer's novel Die Martinsklause in which a tyrannical administrator in Berchtesgaden claims excessive privileges.

== Countries ==
=== Germany ===
==== Baden-Württemberg ====
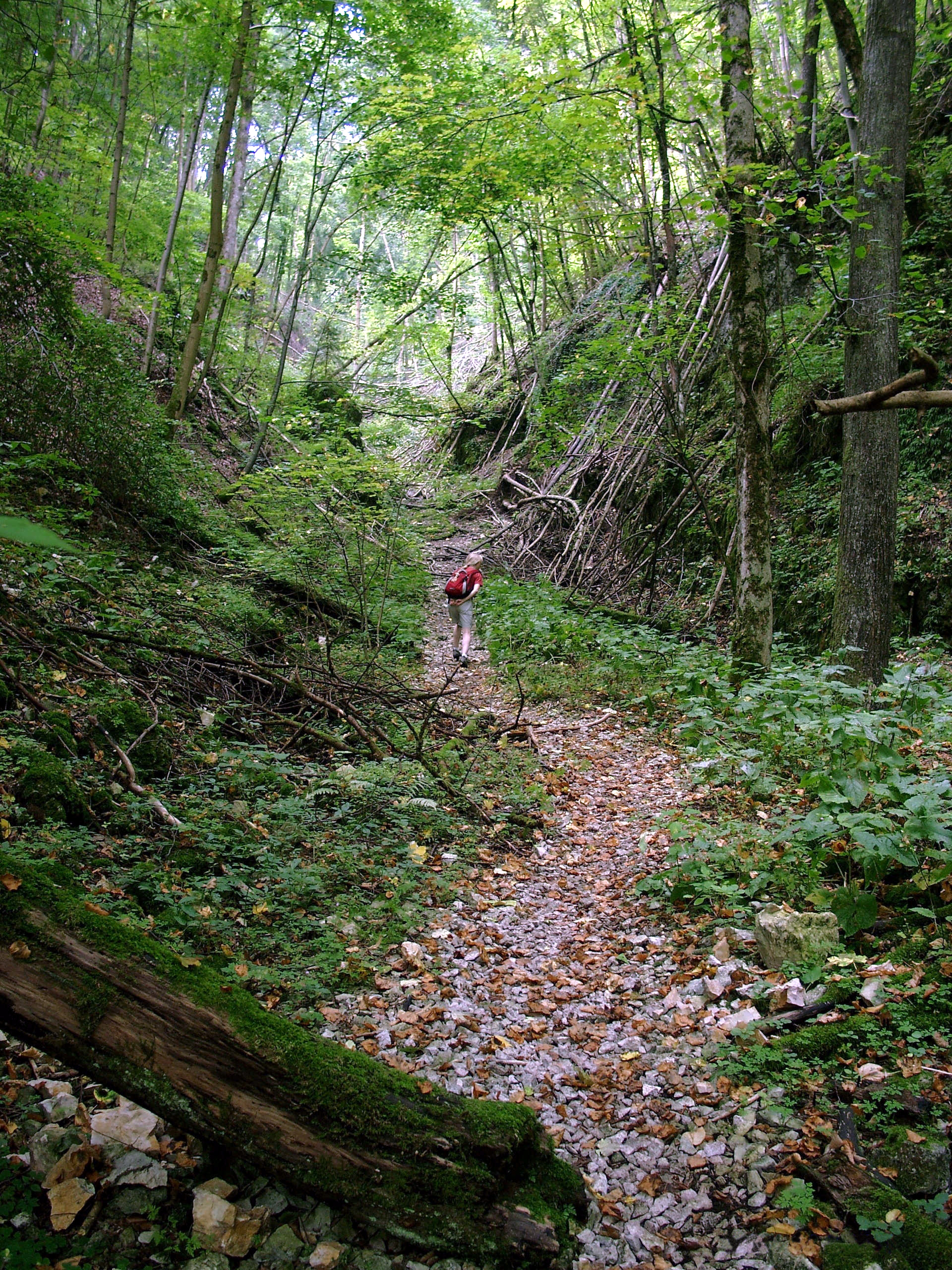
Banned forest with footpath in Baden-Württemberg

→ see also: List of Bannwälder in Baden-Württemberg

In Baden-Württemberg, there are Bannwälder Totalreservate, fully protected reserves where any use is strictly prohibited by law. In other federal states of Germany such total reserves are known under different names. Due to their structural diversity in living trees and dry wood banned forests are refugia for many endangered species of animals, plants, and mushrooms. Removal of plants or part of plants like flowers, leaves, seeds, or fruits from these areas is prohibited, as is altering the natural flow of water. A tree may be felled if it represents an imminent danger to nearby roads, but the wood and all other parts of the tree must remain in the reserve. Roads and vehicles are not allowed, previous existing roads must be blocked and removed, only footpaths may be maintained in the area. Disturbance of wildlife through photography is prohibited. No chemicals may be used in these areas. The areas are under supervision and their developments are monitored. Hunting may be allowed with special permission.

==== Bavaria ====
In Bavaria "forest and its existence and size is extremely essential in particular in densely populated and sparsely wooded areas and consequently its size and structure must be preserved as it is of extraordinary importance for the climate, water resources or for air purification" and may be classified as banned forest."

==== Hessen ====
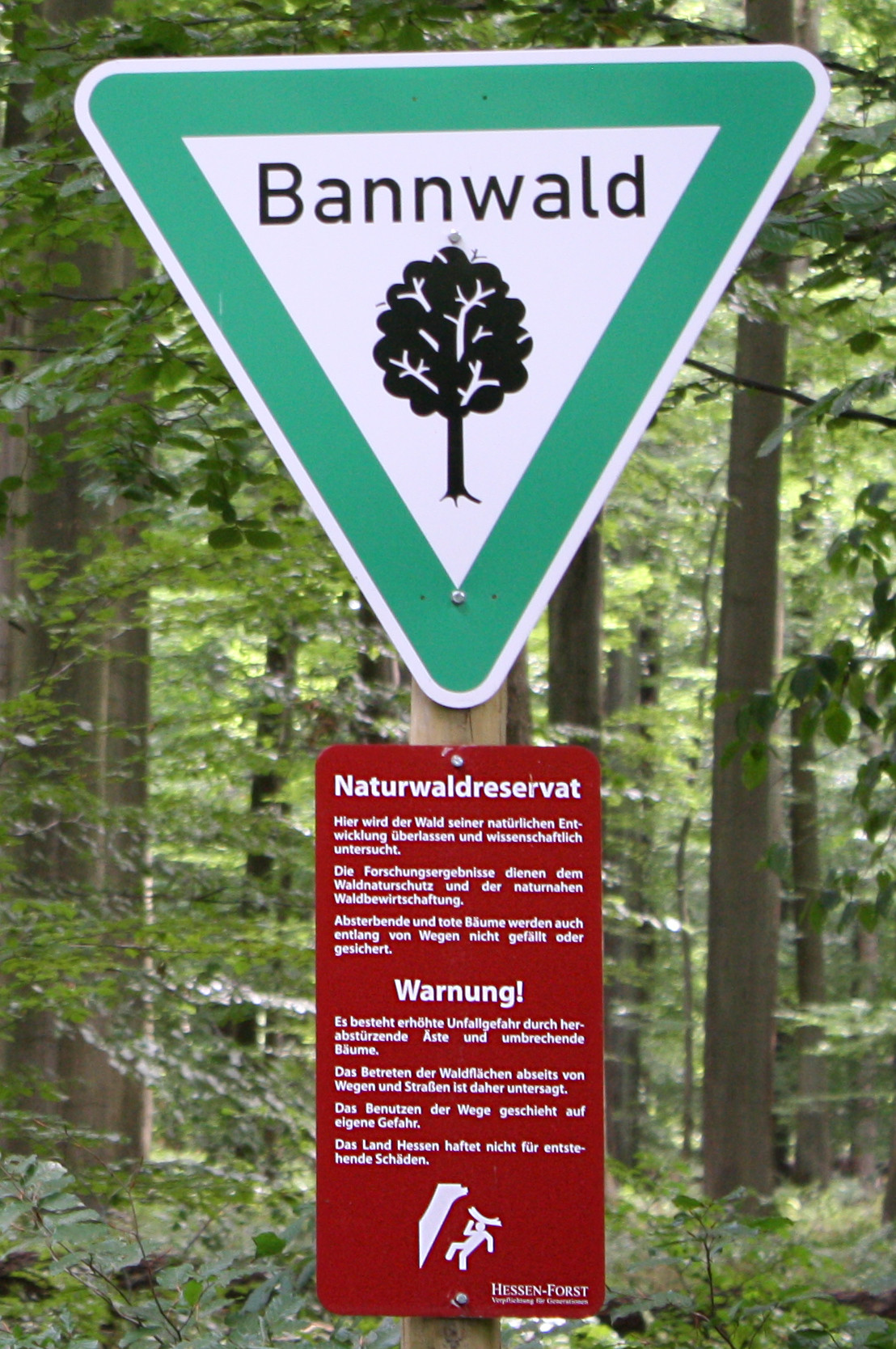
Information sign in Rockenberg (Hesse)

In Hesse a Bannwald is a forest which because of its location, size and extraordinary importance for hydrological balance, climate and air purification has to be preserved and may be cut only in exceptional cases.

=== Austria ===
In Austria, a Bannwald is a stricter form of a protection forest.

=== Switzerland ===
The Swiss Forestry Act of 1874 uses the term, Schutzwald (protection forest), rather than Bannwald.

== See also ==
- List of types of formally designated forests
- Protected forest
- Schonwald
- Wildbannforst
