= 21st Century Tiger =

Fundraising organisation (1997–2018)

21st Century Tiger logo

21st Century Tiger was a fundraising organisation for wild tiger conservation projects. It was formed in 1997 as a partnership between the Zoological Society of London (ZSL), Global Tiger Patrol (GTP) and Tusk Force (both now defunct) so that the three groups could collaborate, rather than compete, in raising money for tigers in the UK. The two current members of the coalition are ZSL and Dreamworld Wildlife Foundation (DWF). Based in offices provided by ZSL in Regent's Park, London, and with administration funded by a sponsor, it is able to spend 100% of funds raised on tiger projects. Since its inception, 21st Century Tiger has provided over £2 million to over 70 tiger projects in seven countries.

In 2018, 21st Century Tiger merged with the Amur Leopard and Tiger Alliance (ALTA) to become "WildCats Conservation Alliance" in an effort to streamline administration and resources, while continuing the partnership between ZSL and DWF.

== History ==
21st Century Tiger was established in 1997 and formally launched at the Tigers 2000 meeting at ZSL in 1997 by John Gummer, the then UK Minister for the Environment. It assisted the UK's Department for Environment, Food and Rural Affairs (DEFRA) in channelling funds for tiger conservation to effective projects in tiger range. Current support has come from members of the public, businesses, and notably from zoos, particularly in Europe and Australasia.

Realising the potential fundraising abilities of the European Zoo community, between 2002 and 2004 the European Association of Zoos and Aquaria (EAZA) Tiger Campaign in European zoos raised over three-quarters of a million euros which was channelled through 21st Century Tiger. Over 130 zoos in 24 countries took part in the campaign, from Finland to France and from Ireland to Russia.

Zoo and Aquarium Association (Australasia) formerly known as ARAZPA, launched a parallel tiger campaign during 2003, also using 21st Century Tiger to channel the funds and raised more than A$100,000. ZAAA zoos hold only the Sumatran tiger, unlike European zoos which have both Amur and Sumatran, and their efforts continue to be focused on projects in Sumatra.

== Projects ==
Since its inception, 21st Century Tiger has funded over 70 projects, distributing over £2 million and supported projects in seven countries - India, Indonesia, China, Malaysia, Cambodia, Thailand and Russia. The projects cover a wide spectrum of requirements for tiger conservation, including training for wildlife rangers in the application of wildlife law, jungle survival and identification of endangered species, support for anti-poaching units which deal directly with poachers, uncover networks of illegal trading, and even advise in cases of human-tiger conflict. In Russia and Indonesia scientific research is also funded, including studies of tiger home ranges and tiger prey densities, and of methods for limiting the habitat damage caused by economic development. Comprehensive and thorough research provides a sound scientific basis for conservation planning and is an essential part of any conservation programme. 21st Century Tiger also funds education and awareness raising programmes within tiger range countries; vital for ensuring sustainable local support for wildlife conservation.

21st Century Tiger works with a range of organisations from the internationally known Wildlife Conservation Society (WCS) and International Fund for Animal Welfare (IFAW) to small, focused local groups such as Phoenix Fund in Russia. All projects submitted for funding are rigorously examined by a panel of international experts. The projects must have sound practical scientific and conservation value and use local staff wherever possible.

== Year of the Tiger and beyond ==
The international conservation community who met at the Kathmandu Tiger Workshop in late 2009, announced in their official recommendations that we should "celebrate 2010, Year of the Tiger, throughout the world, to create global awareness of the critical plight of the wild tiger and enlist broad and deep support for their conservation". 21st Century Tiger did just that and worked with other NGOs, businesses, the zoo community and members of the public and raised over £144,000 for tigers. The International Tiger Forum took place in St. Petersburg, described by Simon Stuart of the IUCN as "the most significant meeting ever held to discuss the fate of a single non-human species". The conference brought the plight of wild tigers to the world's attention, there were promises of funding, attendance by world leaders and much press. The initial push during 2010 was impressive, but that momentum must be sustained to ensure a future for tigers in the wild.

== Bibliography ==
- Gratwick, Brian; Bennett, Elizabeth L.; Broad, Steven; Christie, Sarah; Dutton, Adam; Gabriel, Grace; Kirkpatrick, Craig; Nowell, Kristin (2007). "The World Can't Have Wild Tigers and Eat Them Too". Conservation Biology. 22 (1): 222–223. doi:10.1111/j.1523-1739.2007.00802.x. PMID 18254867. S2CID 205657327.
- Kāranta, Ke. Ullāsa (2003). Tigers. Colin Baxter Photography Ltd. ISBN 978-1-84107-174-9.
- Kāranta, Ke. Ullāsa, ed. (2006). Tiger Tales: Tracking the Big Cat Across Asia. London: Penguin Books India. ISBN 978-0-14400-138-5.
- Padel, Ruth (2005). Tiger in Red Weather. London: Little, Brown. ISBN 978-0-31672-600-9.
- Seidensticker, John (1996). Tigers. Voyageur Press. ISBN 978-0-89658-295-8.
- Seidensticker, John; Jackson, Peter; Christie, Sarah (8 February 1999). Riding the Tiger: Tiger Conservation in Human Dominated Landscapes. Contributor Richard Burge, Zoological Society of London. Cambridge University Press. ISBN 978-0-52164-835-6.
- Skipwith, Joanna (2006). Tiger. Animals in Art. London: Silver Jungle. ISBN 978-0-95526-520-4.
- Zimmerman, Alexandra; Hatchwell, Matthew; Dickie, Lesley A.; West, Chris (2007). Zoos in the 21st Century: Catalysts for Conservation?. Cambridge: Cambridge University Press. ISBN 978-0-52161-858-8.
