= Phoenix Fund =

Russian conservation organization

Phoenix Fund / Фонд "Феникс"
- Founded: 1998
- Founder: Sergei Bereznuk
- Dissolved: Not Applicable
- Purpose: wildlife and forest protection, environmental education
- Location: Russia
- Region served: Russian Far East
- Members: Not Applicable
- Owner: Not Applicable
- Key people: Sergei Bereznuk, Director / Сергей Березнюк
- Revenue: Not Applicable
- Endowment: Not Applicable
- Website: http://fundphoenix.org/

Phoenix Fund (Фонд "Феникс") is a Russian wildlife and forest conservation organization serving regions of the Russian Far East, especially Primorski Krai and Khabarovsk Krai. This area includes globally significant biodiversity, including the Amur leopard, Siberian tiger, and other predators, as well as a number of recognized Protected Areas including national parks, wildlife refuges, and nature reserves.

Phoenix Fund was founded by Russian and U.S. conservationists and registered in Vladivostok as a Russian non-profit, non-governmental organization in March 1998. It is headquartered in Vladivostok.

== Programs ==
Phoenix Fund defines its programs as:

- Anti-Poaching Activities, with the goal of ending the illegal hunting of tigers, leopards, and other protected species
- Resolution of Human-Tiger Conflicts, with the goal of protecting human communities while preventing the killing of tigers
- Forest Fire-Fighting
- Compensation for Damages of livestock lost to leopards, tigers, and other predators
- Ecological Education and Outreach in rural communities of the Russian Far East
- Public monitoring of industrial projects, including oil and natural gas development

== Mission statement ==
A collective biodiversity recovery programme.

== Administration ==
The founder director of Phoenix Fund is Sergei Bereznuk. He was formerly a tiger inspector in Rosprirodnadzor, Russia's environmental protection agency.

== Affiliations ==
Phoenix Fund is one of the implementing organizations of the Amur Leopard and Tiger Alliance (ALTA) and partners with non-governmental organizations in Britain, the United States, Germany, and Finland as well as Russia to conserve the Amur leopard, Siberian tiger, and their habitat and ecology. Phoenix is also a member of the 21st Century Tiger#International Tiger Coalition, made up of environmental, zoo and animal protection organizations as well as the traditional Chinese medicine community. Phoenix Fund's other partners include Wildlife Alliance and Pacific Environment in the United States, 21st Century Tiger in the United Kingdom, and other international conservation and sustainable development organizations.

== History and background ==
Phoenix Fund was founded by Russian and U.S. conservationists and registered in Vladivostok as a Russian non-profit, non-governmental organization in March 1998. The logo of the organization is the Phoenix (mythology), which rises anew from its own ashes after death, a symbol of everlasting revival. The logo was chosen to reflect the rebirth of the Russian Far East's wildlife and habitats following environmental degradation at the end of the Soviet Union.

In 2006, Sergei Bereznuk received one of the Whitley Awards (UK) for outstanding achievements in nature conservation, related to the protection of the Amur leopard from oil pipeline development. The pipeline was believed to be a grave threat to threatened biodiversity across Siberia and the Russian Far East.

In June 2012, Sergei Bereznuk became a winner of Rolex Global Awards for Enterprise for his achievements and innovations in tiger conservation.
