= Protection forest =

Forest that protects from natural hazard

Protection forests are forests that mitigate or prevent the impact of a natural hazard, including a rockfall, avalanche, erosion, landslide, debris flow or flooding on people and their assets in mountainous areas. A protection forest generally covers the sloping area between a hazard potential (e.g. an unstable rock cliff or an avalanche release zone) and the endangered or exposed assets. In the Alps, protection forests are increasingly considered equal to engineered mitigation measures against natural hazards. In French, German, Italian and Slovenian protection forests are called respectively, Forêt de protection, Schutzwald, foreste di protezione, varovalni gozdovi, and even their maintain function is to protect soil and to prevent it from eroding or blowing away.

== Austrian law ==
The Austrian law makes it clear the difference between a protection forest Schutzwald and a protected forest Bannwald. In this case it can be seen that a protection forest is largely protecting the natural features of the forest physical environment. It is protecting itself. Whereas a protected forest is seen as also having a protective function, it is specifically said to protect against a concrete threat which is specified in the Bann or protection order.

21 Schutzwald (Protection forest / Protective forest)

(1) Location protective forests (forests on special locations) within the meaning of this Federal Law are forests, their location if threatened by the erosive forces of wind, water and gravity, and require special handling to protect the soil and the plant cover and to ensure reforestation. These are

  - 1. Forests on drifting sand- or drifting soil,
  - 2. Forests prone to the development of karst or highly erodible sites,
  - 3. Forests in rocky, shallow subtle or abrupt layers if their reforestation is only possible under difficult conditions,
  - 4. Forests on slopes where dangerous slope slides might occur,
  - 5. the plant cover in the zone of the forest,
  - 6. the area immediately adjacent to the forest surroundings.

(2) Protection forests benefiting from this Federal Forest Law property, people, human settlements or facilities or cultivated soil are particularly protected against natural hazards or damaging environmental influences and which require special treatment to achieve and maintain their protective effect.

(3) The provisions on protection forests also apply to the forest growth in the neighborhood of the forest, so far as it falls within the meaning of section § 6 para. 2. 22 Schutzwald (1) The owner of a protection forest has to handle each place according to local conditions so that its preservation is as guaranteed as possible, with timely site-appropriate growth, solid internal structure renewal. (2) when a forest meets the conditions for qualification as a protection forest pursuant to § 21 above, the forest owner is to treat the forest as a protection forest, even if the protection forest status has not been given by formal notification. (3) The owner of a protection forest site, when the protection forest site is not in the sense of § 21 para. 2, is obliged to implement measures in accordance with para. 1 and 4, as the cost of these measures can be covered from income generated by fellings covered from this protection forest site. In addition, he is obliged to reforest cleared areas or unplanned clear areas from windthrows etc. except for gains as a protection forest, as well as forest protection measures in accordance with §§ 40 to 45. (3a) The owner of an protection forest site is obliged to carry out measures in accordance with para. 1 and 4, as the cost of these measures are covered by public funds or payments by beneficiaries. Regardless the owner is obliged to reforestation cleared areas or unplanned clear areas and to implement forest protection measures in accordance with §§ 40 to 45. The remaining obligations of the forest owner under this Federal Act shall remain unaffected.

(4) The Federal Minister for Agriculture, Forestry, Environment and Water Management can regulate the treatment and use of protective forests by closer regulation. This will be especially ordered by

  - a) a permit is needed for free fellings (§ 85), unless § 96 para. 1 lit. a and § 97 lit. A applies,
  - b) the further reforestation is laid down according to § 13,
  - c) a different objective from an ordinance pursuant to § 80 para. 4 an altered age cutting is to be observed.

27 Bannwald (Protected forest) (1) are to be made by the procedures in the Bann

  - 1. Protection forests sites which serve the direct defense of certain risks to people, human settlements or facilities or cultivated soil,
  - 2. Forests whose welfare activity against the economics belongs, a priority, and
  - 3. Forests that serve to directly address threats arising from the condition of the forest, or its management,

provided that the protected economic or other public interest (Bann purpose) to be an important proves that with the limitation of forest management as a result of the disadvantages associated Bannlegung (Bann Forest). (2) Bann purposes within the meaning of para. 1 are particularly

  - a) the protection against avalanches, landslide, rockfall, snowdrift, earth movement, flood, wind, or similar hazards,
  - b) the defense against dangerous emission hazards,
  - c) the protection of holy springs and tourist connections and areas without undermining the requirements of hygiene and relaxation while securing the necessary forestation for these purposes around such places,
  - d) securing water transfer,
  - e) ensuring the usability of transport routes and energy industry transmission systems,
  - f) securing the defensive working of the country's defense,
  - g) the protection against hazards arising from the condition of the forest or its management.

== See also ==
- Bannwald
- List of types of formally designated forests
- Protected forest
- Forest protection
