= Schonwald =

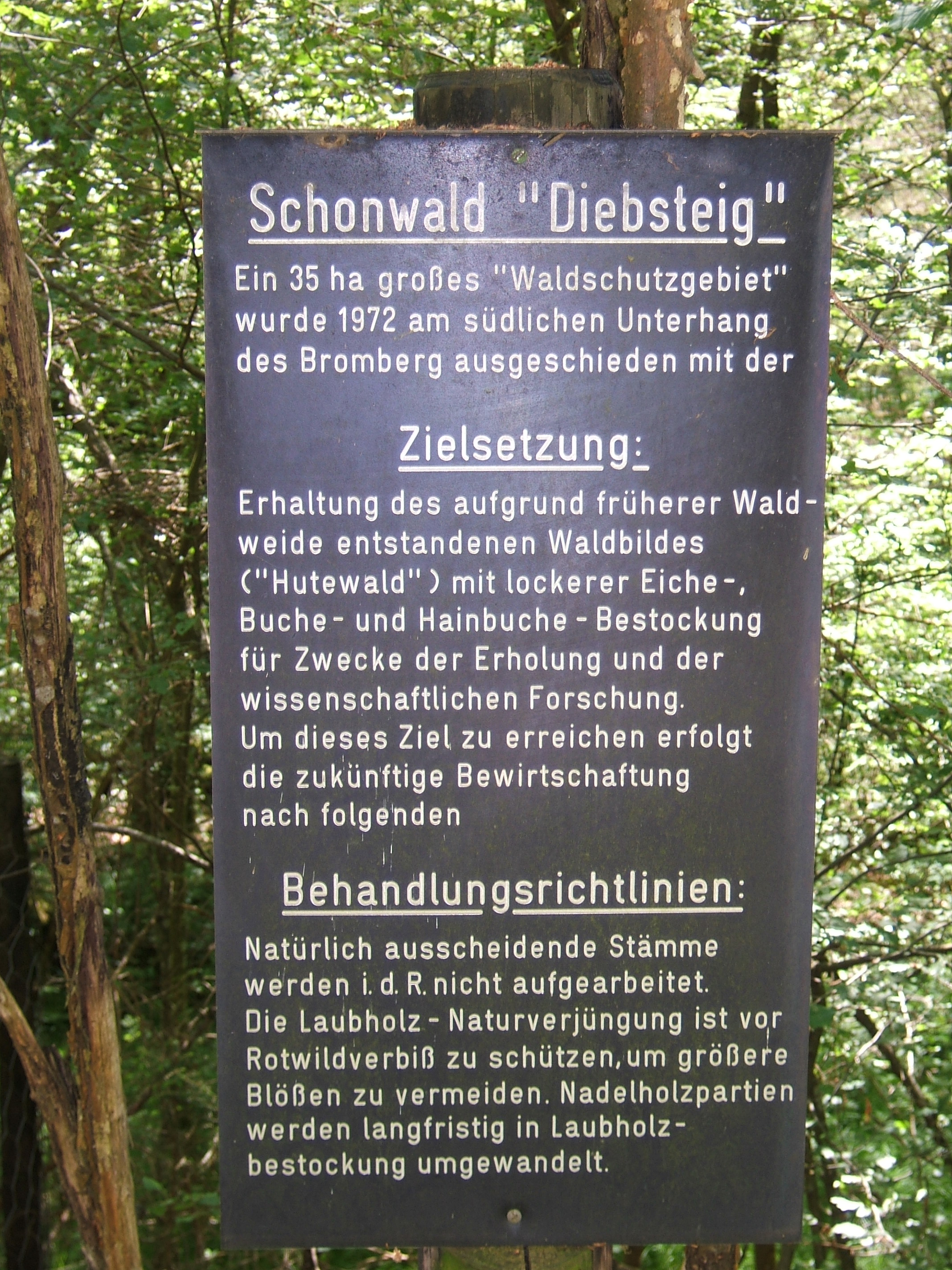
Information board in Schönbuch

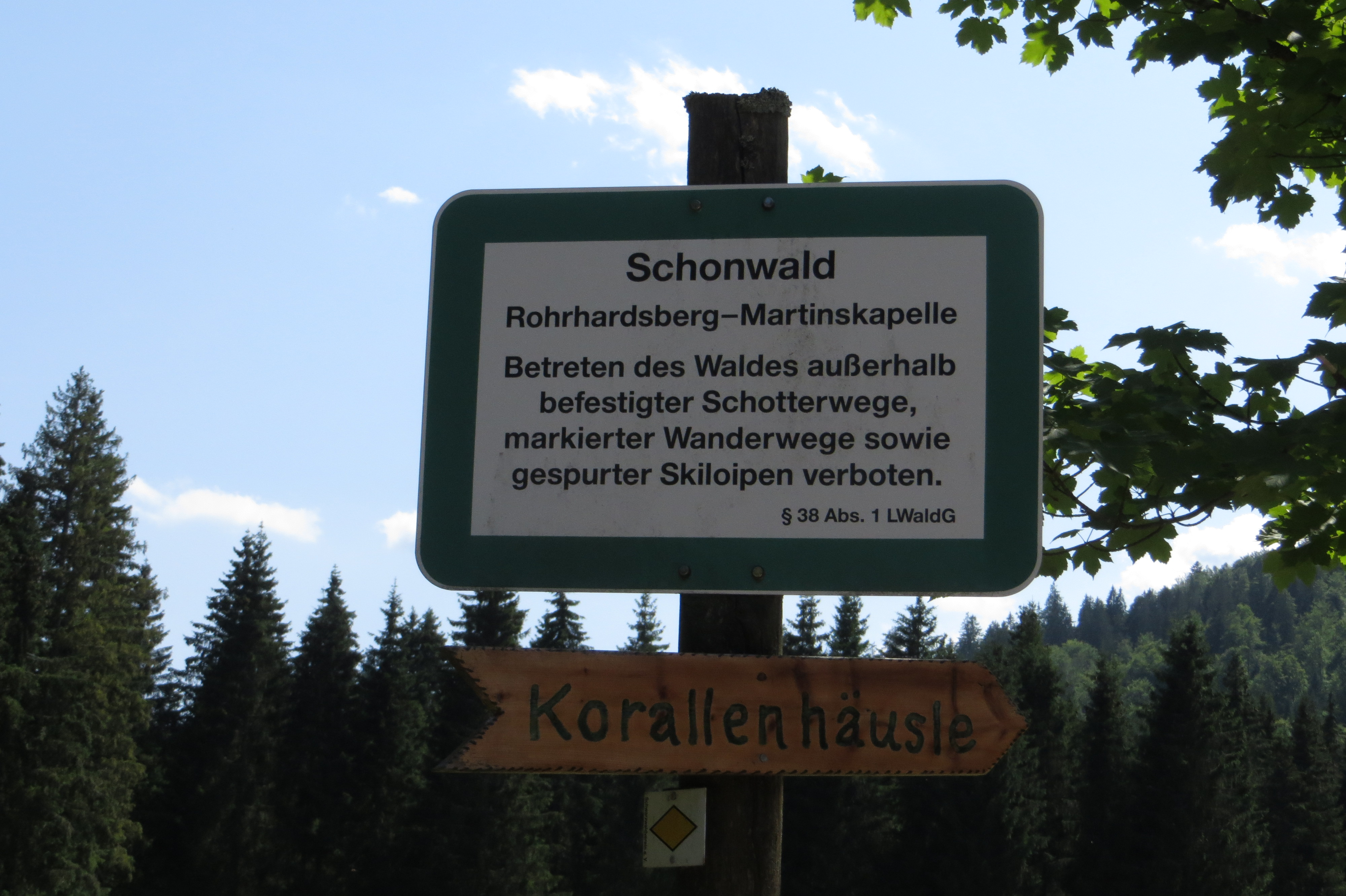
Sign for a Schonwald near Schönwald, Baden-Württemberg

A Schonwald is the term used in the German state of Baden-Württemberg for a protected woodland area, in which economic usage of the forest is permitted, but under certain restrictions. The term is not used in other German-speaking regions or is at best a colloquial term there.

Schonwald is defined in § 32 of the Baden-Württemberg Forests Act as follows:

[A] schonwald is a woodland reserve, in which a specified woodland community with its animal and plant species, a specified composition of trees or a specified forest biotope is to be conserved, developed or regenerated. The forestry authorities will lay down management measures with the consent of the forest owner.

A higher level of protection is afforded by the Bannwald, a term which is also recognised outside the state. Within Baden-Württemberg a Bannwald is defined at § 32 of the Forests Act as "a woodland reserve which is left to itself".

== See also ==
- List of types of formally designated forests
- Schönwald
