= Corporate forest =

Forest owned by a corporate body

A corporate forest is a forest or woodland area owned by a corporate body rather than a state or individual.

For example, in Germany, a corporate forest (German: Körperschaftswald) is, in accordance with Section 3, Paragraph 2, of the Federal Forest Act (Bundeswaldgesetz), a wood owned by a public body such as a municipality or town (also called a communal, town or municipal forest or even an "interested parties forest"), a university (then called a university forest) or other specified body.

Forests owned by the Church are not automatically classified by the German federal government as corporate forests, but may be so classified by state law. The special features of corporate forests are regulated in the state forest laws. In Saxony-Anhalt, for example, it is stipulated that corporate forests serve the common good to a special degree, that the economic objectives must ensure the conservation and sustainable management of the forest as an overall resource, that the utility, protective and recreational functions form a unit and that corporate forests must be managed in accordance with ecological and economic requirements In Saxony, the regulations for corporate forests also apply to church forests.

Other types of forest may include state forests and private forests.

== See also ==
- List of types of formally designated forests
