= William G. Conway =

American zoologist (1929–2021)

- Born: November 20, 1929; St. Louis, Missouri, US
- Died: October 21, 2021 (aged 91); New Rochelle, New York, US
- Occupation: Zoologist
- Known for: General Director and President Emeritus of the Wildlife Conservation Society
- Awards: Ulysses S. Seal Award for Innovation in Conservation (2011)

William Gaylord Conway (November 20, 1929 – October 21, 2021) was an American zoologist, ornithologist and conservationist.

William Gaylord Conway was born on November 20, 1929, in St. Louis, Missouri.

He began his career with the St. Louis Zoo. He joined the New York Zoological Society in 1956 as assistant curator of birds. He was later promoted to director of the society, and then became president of it in 1992 when it was reconfigured into the Wildlife Conservation Society. He retired as president in 1999 and retained the title of senior conservationist.

During his tenure, Conway was responsible for modernizing the animal exhibits at the Bronx Zoo, and he also introduced now iconic Bronx Zoo exhibits, including the World of Darkness (1969), the World of Birds (1972), Wild Asia (1977), JungleWorld (1985), and Congo Gorilla Forest (1999). Conway was a proponent of zoological exhibition of animals in a setting that recreated the environment from which the species originated.

Conway successfully negotiated the society's acquisition of the Central Park Zoo from the New York City municipal government in 1981, which resulted in an extensive renovation program for the attraction so it could meet modern zoological exhibition requirements.

Conway has also been in the forefront of promoting captive breeding programs for endangered species. He was responsible for creating the Wildlife Propagation Trust in 1964, that resulted in the coordination of zoos to pursue the twin goals of preserving at-risk species and eventually reintroducing animals back to the wild.

Conway appeared as himself on May 7, 1962 episode of the CBS game show To Tell the Truth.

Conway was also responsible for leading the development of the American Zoo and Aquarium Association accreditation program. He has authored more than 250 articles and reports relating to wildlife conservation, ornithology, wild animal care propagation and ecological preservation.

In 1999, the National Audubon Society awarded Conway its highest honor, the Audubon Medal.

Conway died on October 21, 2021, in New Rochelle, New York.
