= Schönwalde =

Schönwalde may refer to the following places in Germany:

- Schönwalde, Mecklenburg-Vorpommern, a municipality in the district Uecker-Randow, Mecklenburg-Vorpommern
- Schönwalde, Saxony-Anhalt, a municipality in the district of Stendal, Saxony-Anhalt
- Schönwalde am Bungsberg, a municipality in the district Ostholstein, Schleswig-Holstein
- Schönwalde-Glien, a municipality in the district Havelland, Brandenburg
- Schönwalde, a village part of the municipality of Wandlitz in the district of Barnim, Brandenburg

== See also ==
- Schönwald (disambiguation)
