= Private nonindustrial forest land =

Private nonindustrial forest lands are forest lands in various countries, owned by private individuals or organizations that do not also own a wood processing facility.

Nonindustrial private forests cover about 360 million acres in the United States, or roughly one-half of the nation's total forested acres.

Nonindustrial private forests or “NIPFs” are unlike public or industrial forests. Most of these forests are small, family owned, and timber-producing. In terms of size, 95 percent cover less than 100 acres, and 60 percent cover less than 10 acres. Due to parcellization, the number of NIPF owners has increased in recent decades, while the average tract size has shrunk. Nonetheless, at 360 million cumulative acres, nonindustrial private forests constitute a significant portion of the nation's undeveloped land.

Most nonindustrial private forests are family owned. Title to 250 million acres,. or 70 percent of all NIPFs, is held by individuals, married couples, or family estates and trusts. These family owned forests tend to pass from generation to generation. Those that are not family owned are held by partnerships, tribes, or corporations.

== See also ==
- List of types of formally designated forests
