= Last of the Wild =

Last of the Wild is an initiative created in 2002 on behalf of the Wildlife Conservation Society (WCS) and the Center for International Earth Science Information Network (CIESIN) at Columbia University to identify the last remaining 'wild' areas on the Earth's land surface, measured by human influence. By mapping and measuring the extent of human ecological footprints, and using an overlaying method to determine the Human Influence Index (HII), WCS and CIESIN are able to establish the areas that have been least affected by human activities (places with Human Footprint grid values less than or equal to 10) which has currently determined a Last of the Wild status for 569 places globally.

By understanding where the Earth's wildest areas still remain, conservation organisations are able to maximise on the best opportunities for conservation which, as of 2002, lay within 87% of the terrestrial planet. The conservation of areas identified as 'The Last of the Wild' are less likely to be obscured by conflicts and proposals of human infrastructure and as a result may obtain this status for a prolonged period of time.

== See also ==
- High-Biodiversity Wilderness Areas
- Biodiversity Hotspots
- Biosphere Reserves
- Protected Areas
- Conservation movement
- Ecoregions
- Crisis Ecoregions
