= Faba Forest Park =

- IUCN category IV (habitat/species management area)
- Interactive map of Faba Forest Park
- Location: Lower River Division Gambia
- Nearest city: Soma
- Coordinates: 13°19′59″N 15°51′10″W
- Area: 517.3 ha (1,278 acres)
- Established: January 1, 1954

Faba Forest Park is a forest park in the Gambia. Established on January 1, 1954, it covers 517.3 hectares.

The estimated altitude of the park is 33 meters.
