= Private protected areas in Australia =

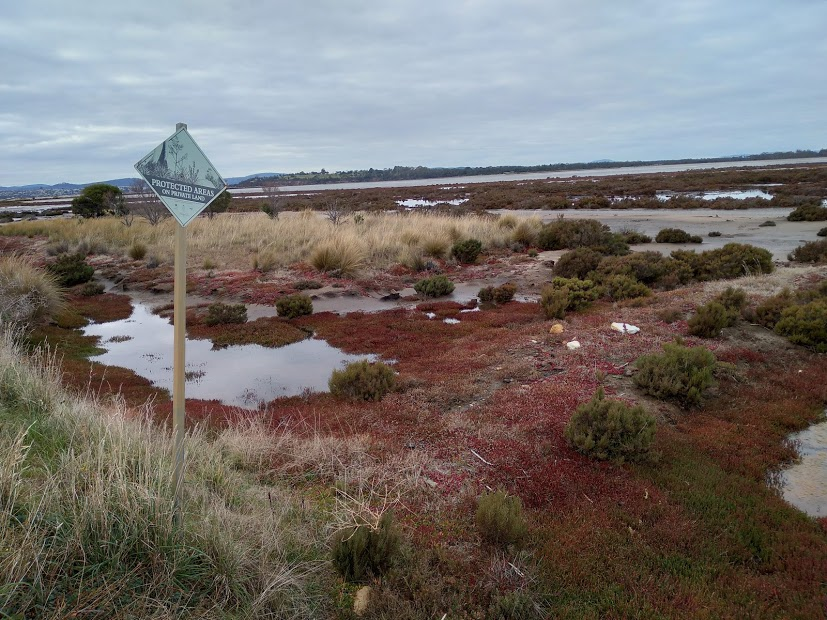
privately protected saltmarsh in Tasmania

In 2010, Australia formulated a strategy for conserving land under the National Reserve System, which would be "a national network of public, Indigenous and private protected areas over land and inland water". States, territories and the commonwealth have enacted legislation to create and protect private lands "in perpetuity". Additionally, they have created mechanisms to fund the conservation of biodiversity in the shorter term. See for example, The Two Rivers Catchment Reserve.

One writer estimated that by September 2013 there were roughly 5000 private properties in Australia comprising some 8,913,000 hectares (22,020,000 acres) which could be considered private protected areas.

== Commonwealth ==
Private protected lands forming part of the National Reserve System must satisfy certain criteria:

- The land must be conserved forever, with a legal mechanism guaranteeing its conservation.
- The land must satisfy certain scientific criteria to enhance the protected area network.
- The land must be managed under one of the six IUCN management categories

Such lands attract Australian Government funding which help in the management according to various guidelines.

=== Examples ===
of private protected areas under the National Reserve System:

- Mornington Sanctuary: Australian Wildlife Conservancy, a 31,200 ha (77,000 acres) area, in the upper catchment of the Fitzroy River and sections of the Wunaamin Miliwundi Ranges. The area was purchased by the Australian Wildlife Conservancy and is managed as an IUCN category II (national park). See Mornington Sanctuary.
- Bush Family Reserve, a 255 ha (630 acres) area of grassy woodland East Gippsland, Victoria, which is managed as an IUCN category IV area (habitat or species management area).

== New South Wales ==
In 2018, 3.9% of private land in New South Wales was managed for conservation.

Under the Biodiversity Conservation Act 2016 (BCA 2016) private land conservation agreements protecting private lands "in perpetuity" are set up and registered. The Biodiversity Conservation Trust keeps a public register of agreements, which are of three kinds: conservation agreements (Sections 5.20-5.26 of BCA 2016), wildlife refuge agreements (Sections 5.27-5.33 of BCA 2016), and biodiversity stewardship agreements (Sections 5.5-5.19 of BCA 2016).

Biodiversity agreements are "in perpetuity" but may be terminated by the Minister (administering this Act) to allow mining. (Sections 5.18, 5.19 of BCA 2016) Similarly, A conservation agreement may be terminated (Section 5.23 of BCA 2016) with or without the agreement of all parties to the conservation agreement. In fact, all types of agreement under the BCA 2016 may be terminated at the will of the minister in the interests of mining without the agreement of the landowners. (Sections 5.23, 5.30) Reflecting this, in respect of wildlife agreements, the Act states (Section 5.33): Nothing in this Division:

(a) prevents the grant of a mining or petroleum authority in respect of land subject to a wildlife refuge agreement in accordance with the Mining Act 1992 or the Petroleum (Onshore) Act 1991, (b) prevents the carrying out, on or in respect of land subject to a wildlife refuge agreement, of any activity authorised by a mining or petroleum authority in accordance with the Mining Act 1992 or the Petroleum (Onshore) Act 1991.

Biodiversity Stewardship Agreements are "in-perpetuity" agreements and registered on the property title. Such sites create ‘biodiversity credits’ which can be sold to offset the impacts of developments elsewhere. Conservation Agreements are covenants on the property title, and may be either in-perpetuity or for a fixed-term, and in some cases attract management payments for the landholder. Wildlife refuge agreements are "in-perpetuity" agreements that can be revoked by the landholder at any time. A complete list of agreements is publicly available.

== Victoria ==
In 1972, the Victorian parliament enacted the Victorian Conservation Trust Act 1972. (VCTA 1972), which established the Trust for Nature, Victoria, which would acquire preserve and maintain areas within the State of "ecologically significan(ce) or of natural interest or beauty or scientific interest and to encourage and assist in the preservation of wild life and native plants". A major role of the trust is the negotiation with private landholders of tracts of land deemed worthwhile to conserve, to create covenants over the land to protect areas

"which the Trust considers to be ecologically significant, of natural interest or beauty, of historic interest or of importance in relation to the conservation of wildlife or native plants". Section 3A VCTA 1972

Then the owner of the land

"may, subject to obtaining the Minister's approval thereof under subsection (8), enter into a covenant with the Trust which binds him as to the development or use of the land or any part thereof or the conservation or care of any bushland trees rock formations buildings or other objects on the land." Section 3A VCTA 1972

Since 1978, Trust for Nature has negotiated more than 1,380 covenants over more than 62,000 hectares (150,000 acres).

=== Examples ===
1. Wombat Gully in Taungurung Country now has conservation covenant over 15.31 ha (37.8 acres) of the property.
2. A new covenant over land near Chiltern, which several ecological communities and a number of endangered species: the barking owl, lace monitor, and a rare wattle, the currawang.
3. A new covenant over 146 ha (360 acres) of a 208 ha (510 acres) property near the Genoa River protects the habitat of the long-nosed potoroo, glossy black cockatoo and coast grey-box and a number of different forests. The covenant was negotiated through the Trust for Nature’s Estates Eastern Forests project.
4. A property on Steels Creek with high conservation value was donated to Trust for Nature. The land will be sold and put under a conservation covenant, with the proceeds being used to further the work of Trust for Nature.

== Tasmania ==
In Tasmania, the instrument by which land is covenanted is the Nature Conservation Act 2002. The act describes what land may have a conservation covenant, how this is to be done, and how landholders are to be compensated. As in other jurisdictions, the land must be deemed to have conservation value.

In September 2019, there were 886 covenanted lands covering 109,325 ha (270,150 acres) in Tasmania.

In Tasmania, the Tasmania Land Conservancy (TLC) performs a similar role to that of the Victorian Trust for Nature. The TLC is a not-for-profit organisation that "raises funds from the public to protect irreplaceable sites and rare ecosystems by buying and managing private land in Tasmania". Thus it owns and manages private reserves, works with landholders to identify and protect ecologically important areas via the creation of conservation agreements and covenants, and, again, like its Victorian counterpart has a revolving fund through its acquisition and sale of land whose conservation is important.

=== Examples ===
- Kelvedon Hills
- Thunderbox Hills reserve
- Prosser River Reserve
- The Big Punchbowl Reserve

== See also ==
- Protected areas of Australia
- Category:Australian Wildlife Conservancy reserves
