= Finto Manereg Forest Park =

- IUCN category IV (habitat/species management area)
- Interactive map of Finto Manereg Forest Park
- Location: Central River Division Gambia
- Nearest city: Brikama
- Coordinates: 13°12′19″N 16°31′35″W
- Area: 1,106 ha (2,730 acres)
- Established: January 1, 1954

Finto Manereg Forest Park is a forest park in the Gambia. Established on January 1, 1954, it covers 1106 hectares.

It is located on a terrain with an estimated altitude of 30 meters.
