= Forest reproductive material =

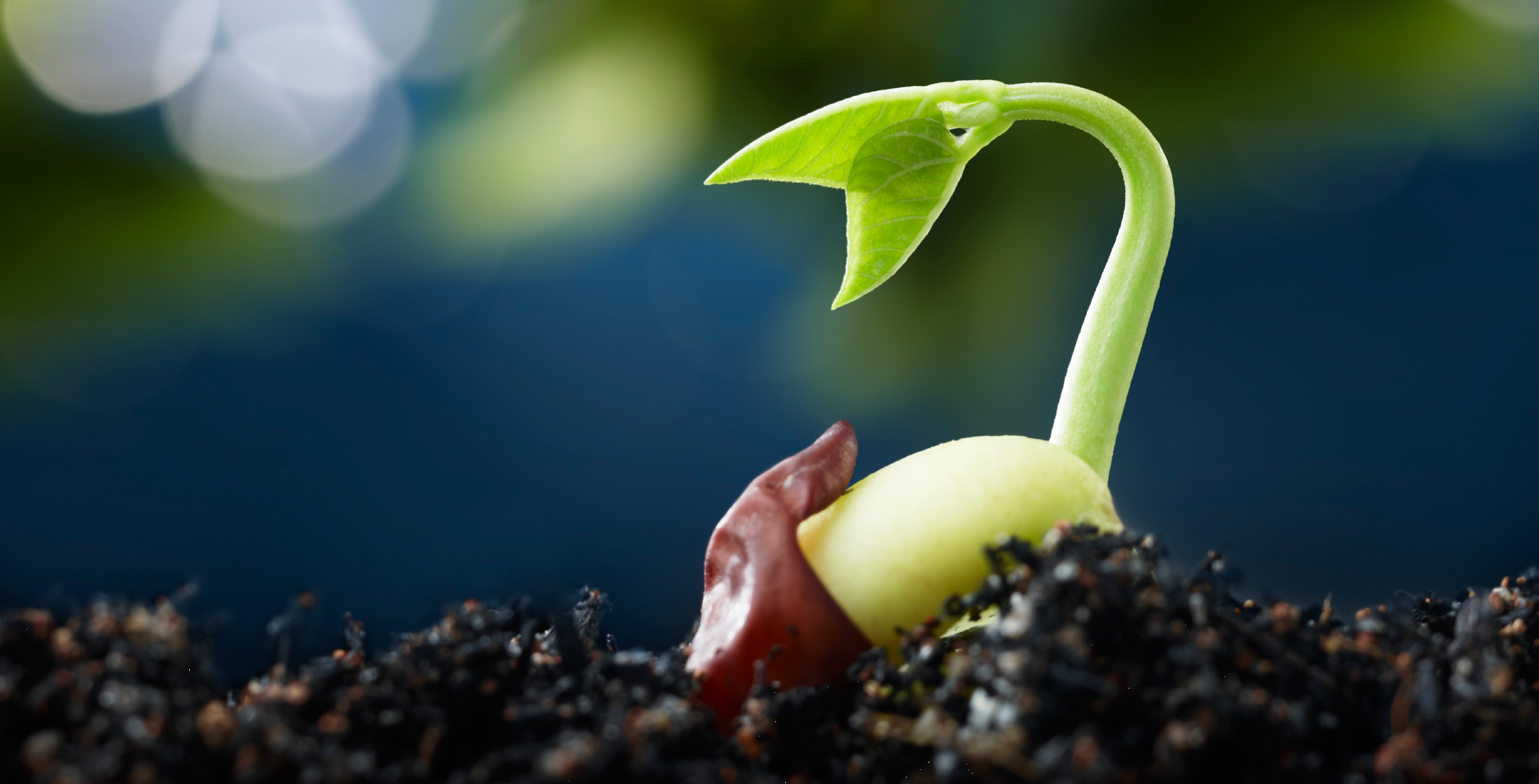
Seed germination

Forest reproductive material is a part of a tree that can be used for reproduction, such as a seed, cutting, or seedling. Artificial regeneration, carried out through seeding or planting, typically involves transferring forest reproductive material to a particular site from other locations while natural regeneration relies on genetic material that is already available on the site.

Technical opportunities and challenges to ensure quality and quantity of forest reproductive material can be found in the activities of identification, selection, procurement, propagation, conservation, improvement and sustained production of reproductive material. The use of low quality or poorly adapted forest reproductive material can have very negative impacts on the vitality and resilience of a forest.

In Europe, much of the material used for artificial regeneration is produced and transferred within a single country. However, forest reproductive material, usually in the form of seeds or cuttings, is increasingly traded across national borders, especially within the European Union.

== Forest reproductive material and climate changes ==
As a result of climate changes leading to increasing temperatures, some parts of the current distribution ranges of forest trees are expected to become unsuitable, while new areas may become suitable for many species in higher latitudes or altitudes. This will most likely increase the future demand for imported forest reproductive material as forest managers and owners try to identify tree species and provenances that will be able to grow in their land under new climatic conditions. Forest reproductive material with high plasticity will be increasingly useful for this purpose.
