= High-Biodiversity Wilderness Area =

IUCN protected area classification

A High-Biodiversity Wilderness Area (HBWA) is an elaboration on the IUCN Protected Area classification of a Wilderness Area (Category Ib), which outlines five vast wilderness areas of particularly dense and important levels of biodiversity. The sub-classification was the initiative of Conservation International (CI) in 2003 to identify regions in which at least 70 percent of their original vegetation has remained intact in order to ensure that this is safeguarded and these regions do not become biodiversity hotspots. Currently the areas listed as HBWAs are

- Amazon Basin, Brazil
- Congo Basin, The Democratic Republic of Congo
- New Guinea, Indonesia and Papua New Guinea
- North American Deserts, Southwest United States and Mexico
- Miombo-Mopane Woodlands and Savannas, Zambia

== See also ==
- Biodiversity
- Conservation biology
- Ecoregions
- Important Plant Areas
- Important Bird Area
- International Union for Conservation of Nature
- List of types of formally designated forests
- Protected areas
- Wilderness
