= Flint (surname) =

Flint is a surname. Notable people with the surname include:

- Austin Flint I (1812–1886), American physician
- Austin Flint II (1836–1915), American physician and son of Austin Flint I
- Bob Flint (born 1941), American/Hawaiian ceramicist
- Bruiser Flint (born 1968), American basketball coach
- Caroline Flint (born 1961), British Member of Parliament for the Don Valley
- Charles Ranlett Flint (1850–1934), American merchant and banker
- Dave Flint (born 1971), American ice hockey coach
- Derrick Flint (1924–2018), English cricketer
- Douglas Flint (born 1955), British banking businessman currently the Group Chairman of HSBC Holdings
- Edwin Flint (1814–1891), American politician
- Eric Flint (1947–2022), American science fiction and fantasy author and editor
- F. S. Flint (1885–1960), English poet
- George Flint (American football) (born 1939), American football player
- George Washington Flint (1844–1921), American educator and college president
- Henry Flynt (born 1940), American avantgarde musician
- James Flint (disambiguation)
- Jeremy Flint (1928–1989), English contract bridge player
- John Flint (disambiguation)
- Jon Flint (born 1951), American venture capitalist and entrepreneur
- Jonathan Flint (scientist), British geneticist and academic
- Josh Flint (born 2000), English footballer
- Joshua Barker Flint (1801–1864), American surgeon and professor of medicine
- Judson Flint (1957–2018), American football player
- Katja Flint (born 1960), German actress
- Keith Flint (1969–2019), member of the British band The Prodigy
- Kenneth C. Flint, American fantasy novelist
- Richard Foster Flint (1902–1976), American geologist
- Robert Flint (disambiguation)
- Rockwell J. Flint (1842–1933), American politician
- Roland Flint (1934–2001), American poet
- Valerie Flint (1936–2009), British historian
- Vladimir E. Flint (1924–2004), Russian zoologist and conservationist
- Waldo Flint (1820–1900), American politician
- William Russell Flint (1880–1969), Scottish artist

== See also ==
- Flynt, a surname and given name
- Flinth, a surname
