= Audubon =

American environmental organization

National Audubon Society
- Formation: January 5, 1905; 121 years ago
- Type: Nonprofit organization
- Headquarters: Manhattan, New York City, U.S.
- Coordinates: 40°43′45″N 74°0′19″W
- Region served: United States
- CEO: Elizabeth Gray
- Main organ: Board of Directors
- Website: audubon.org

The National Audubon Society (Audubon; /ˈɔːdəbɒn/) is an American non-profit environmental organization dedicated to conservation of birds and their habitats. Located in the United States and incorporated in 1905, Audubon is one of the oldest of such organizations in the world. There are completely independent Audubon Societies in the United States, which were founded several years earlier such as the Massachusetts Audubon Society, Indiana Audubon Society, and Connecticut Audubon Society. The societies are named for 19th century naturalist John James Audubon.

The society has nearly 500 local chapters, each of which is an independent 501(c)(3) non-profit organization voluntarily affiliated with the National Audubon Society. They often organize birdwatching field trips and conservation-related activities. It also coordinates the Christmas Bird Count held each December in the U.S., a model of citizen science, in partnership with Cornell Lab of Ornithology, and the Great Backyard Bird Count each February. Together with Cornell University, Audubon created eBird, an online database for bird observation. The National Audubon Society also has many global partners to help birds that migrate beyond the U.S.'s borders, including BirdLife International based in Great Britain, Bird Studies Canada, American Bird Conservancy, and many partners in Latin America and in the Caribbean. Audubon's International Alliances Program (IAP) brings together people throughout the Western Hemisphere to work together to implement conservation solutions at Important Birds Areas (IBAs).

== History ==
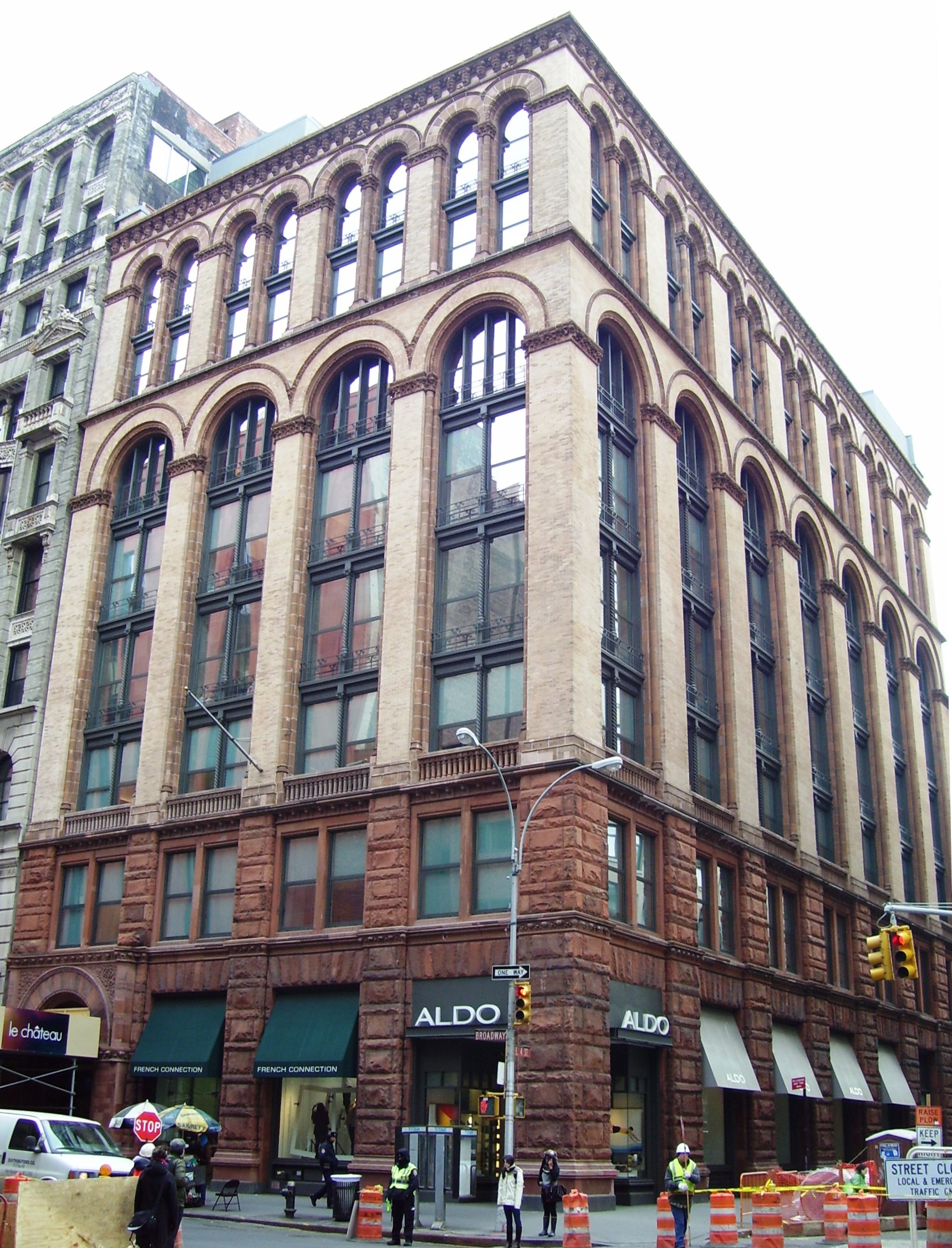
"Audubon House", the former headquarters of the National Audubon Society at 700 Broadway in Manhattan, New York City

=== Development of Audubon societies ===
In 1886, Forest and Stream editor George Bird Grinnell was appalled by the negligent mass slaughter of birds that he saw taking place. As a boy, Grinnell had avidly read Ornithological Biography, a work by the bird painter John James Audubon; he also lived in his early years in a development of the former Audubon estate, Audubon Park in upper Manhattan, and attended a school for boys conducted by Lucy Audubon. The Audubon name would become the namesake of the society he founded, and after its failure, that of local, state, and a national organization bearing that name.

In 1890, a Chicago-based Audubon Society was started under the presidency of E. Irene Rood. About 70 persons joined and the Society was incorporated in 1893.

Within a year of Grinnell founding it his early Audubon Society claimed 39,000 members, eventually growing to 48,862. Each member signed a pledge to "not molest birds". Prominent members included jurist Oliver Wendell Holmes Jr., abolitionist minister Henry Ward Beecher, and poet John Greenleaf Whittier. In under a decade this society was discontinued, but the name and plan survived.

Organizations for the protection of birds were not a wholly new idea. Even before Grinnell's Audubon Society was organized, the American Ornithologists' Union, founded in 1883, was aware of the dangers facing many birds in the United States. There were, however, influential ornithologists who defended the collection of birds. In 1902, Charles B. Cory, the president-elect of the AOU refused to attend a meeting of the District of Columbia Audubon Society stating that "I do not protect birds. I kill them."

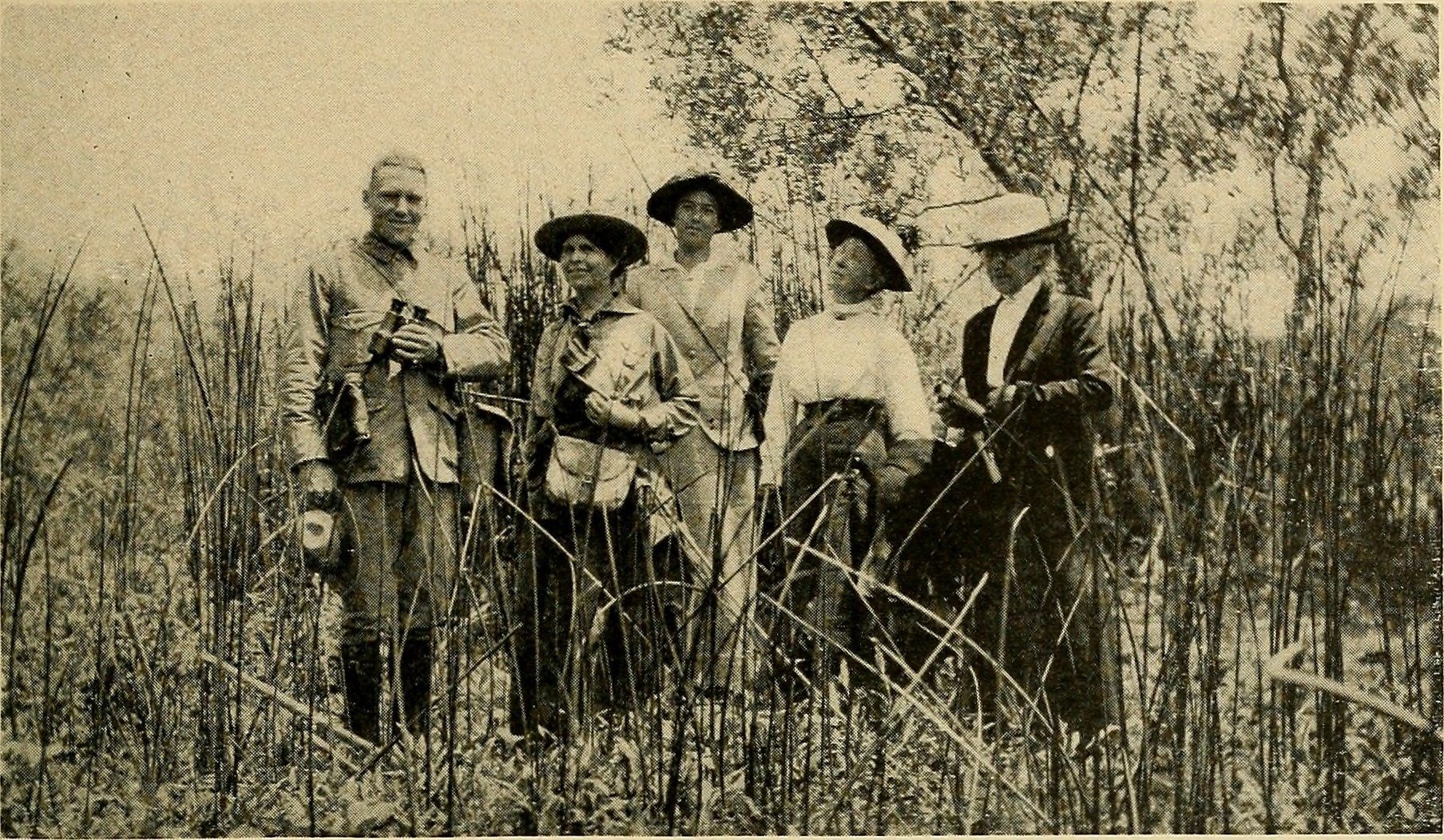
Los Angeles Audubon Society members studying the marsh wren in the Dominguez Slough, 1918

In 1895, a second iteration of the Audubon Society was created, with an unbroken history that traces to today. Cousins and Boston socialites, Harriet Hemenway and Minna B. Hall, disturbed by the destruction left by plume hunters, organized a series of afternoon teas with other wealthy local women, encouraging them to avoid feathered garments. They also sent literature asking these women to, in Hall's words, "join a society for the protection of birds, especially the egret". Later that same year, they founded the Massachusetts Audubon Society. Over 900 women came together with Hemenway and Hall, and across the country, many others were doing the same. These boycotts were largely successful, and the efforts of the early society members helped bring about the end of the plume trade and assisted in the introduction of early conservation legislation such as the Migratory Bird Treaty Act. In 1896, Pennsylvania created their Audubon Society, and during the next few years, bird lovers in many other states followed suit. St. Louis Audubon Society (SLAS) was established in 1916 as the St Louis Bird Club. In 1944, the Bird Club became the first local Audubon chapter in the United States. The national committee of Audubon societies was organized at a meeting held in Washington, D.C. in 1902. 1905 saw the organization of the National Association of Audubon Societies for the Protection of Wild Birds and Animals; William Dutcher was president, and T. Gilbert Pearson was secretary and financial agent. During this time, Albert Willcox provided financial support, more than $331,072 in 1905 and 1906. At the end of 1906, the Association had an interest-bearing endowment fund of more than $336,000 and an income from other sources of approximately $9,000.

=== Bird protection ===
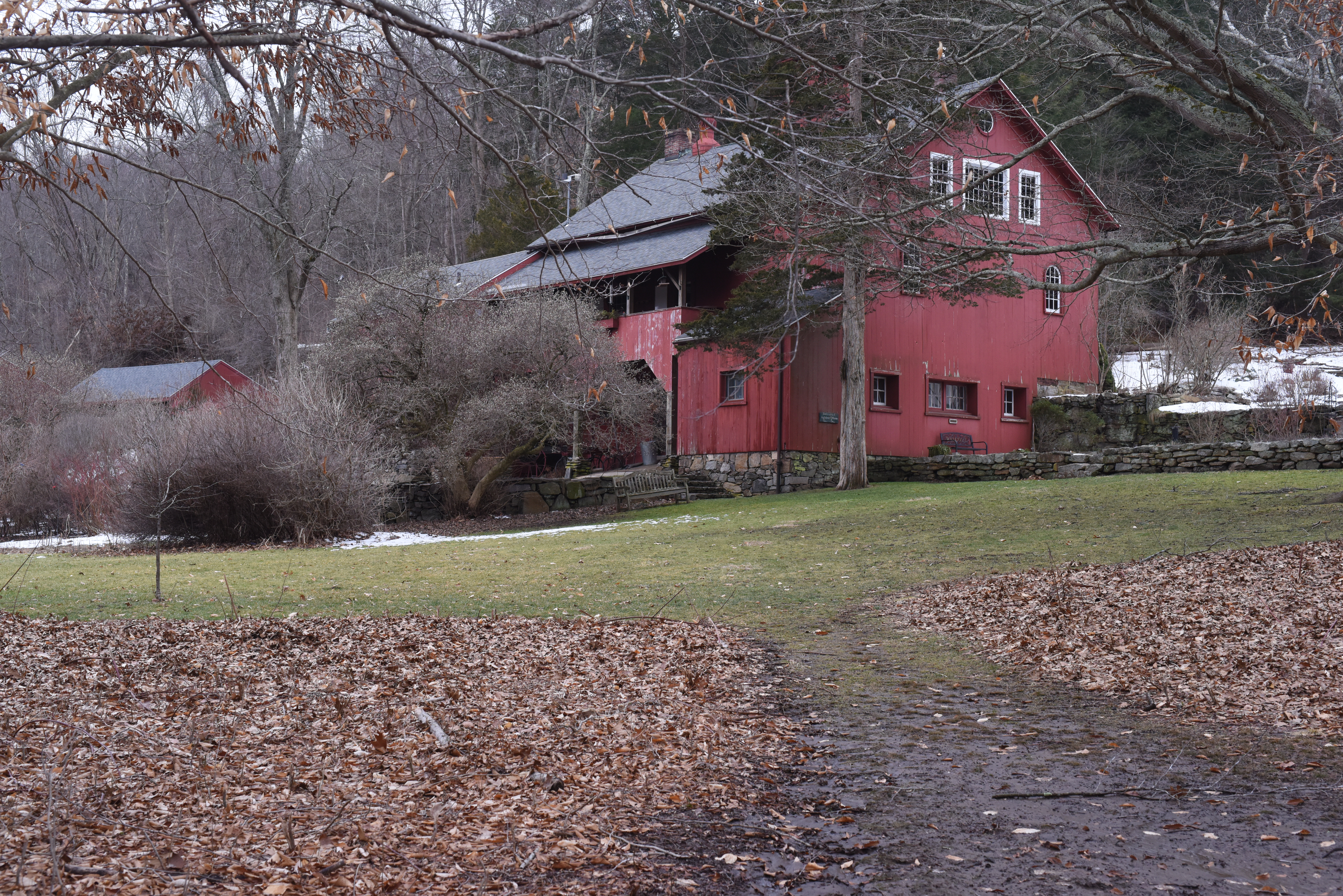
Audubon Center at Bent of the River, Southbury, Connecticut

Birds in the United States were threatened by market hunting as well as for the fashion industry. Pressure from shooting enthusiasts was intense. For example, great auks, whose habit of crowding together on rocks and beaches made them especially easy to hunt, had been driven to extinction early in the century. During one week in the spring of 1897, nature author Florence Merriam claimed to have seen 2,600 robins for sale in one market stall in Washington alone. By the start of the 20th century, the sale of bird flesh had never been greater. The second equally great threat to the bird population was the desire for their plumage. In the late 1890s, the American Ornithologists' Union estimated that five million birds were killed annually for the fashion market. In the final quarter of the 19th century, plumes, and even whole birds, decorated the hair, hats, and dresses of women. Poachers killed game warden Guy Bradley on July 8, 1905; poachers killed Game Warden Columbus G. McLeod in November 1908 in Florida and Audubon Society employee Pressly Reeves of South Carolina also in 1908.

Public opinion soon turned on the fashion industry. Bolstered by the support of Boston socialite Harriet Hemenway, President of the United States and avowed Audubon Society sympathizer Theodore Roosevelt, and a widespread letter-writing campaign driven by church associations, many of whom distributed the Audubon message in their various newsletters, the plume trade was halted by such laws as the New York State Audubon Plumage Law (May 1910), which banned the sales of plumes of all native birds in the state. By 1920, similar laws were enacted in about 12 other states. Audubon Society activities are responsible for many laws for the establishment of game commissions and game warden forces or prohibiting the sale of game.

=== Refuges ===
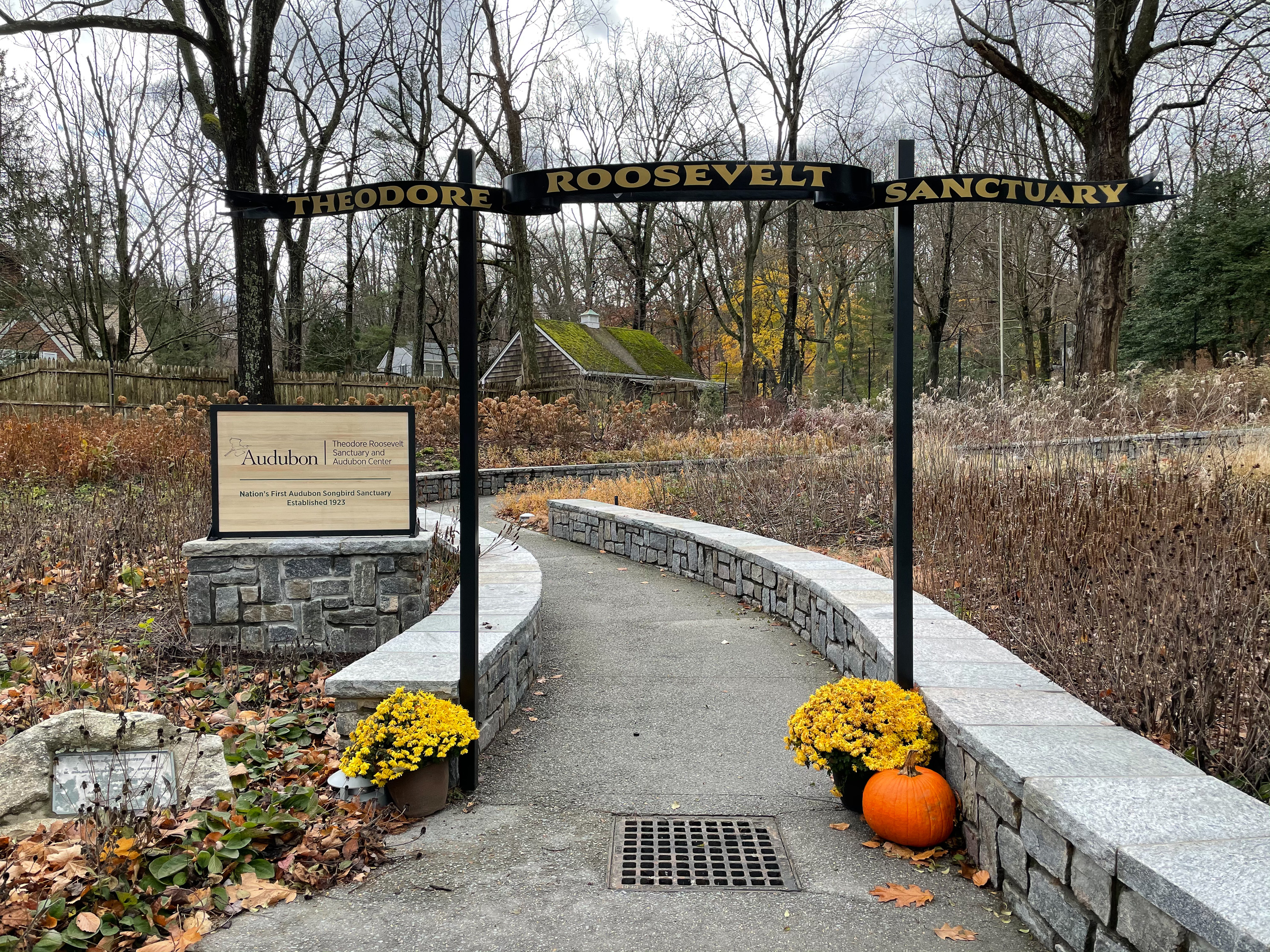
Theodore Roosevelt Sanctuary and Audubon Center, Oyster Bay, New York

In 1918, the NAS actively lobbied for the Federal Migratory Bird Treaty Act. In the 1920s, the organization also played a vital role in convincing the U.S. government to protect vital wildlife areas by including them in a National Wildlife Refuge system.

The association also acquired land through purchases and donation. The Theodore Roosevelt Sanctuary and Audubon Center in Oyster Bay, New York was donated to New York Audubon in 1923 by Emlen Roosevelt and Christine Roosevelt in memory of their cousin, who is buried in the adjacent Youngs Memorial Cemetery. The Audubon Center of Greenwich, Connecticut was founded in 1943. The Paul J. Rainey Wildlife Sanctuary in Louisiana was acquired in 1924. At 26,000 acres (110 km^{2}), it remains the largest.

In the late 20th century, the organization began to place a new emphasis on the development of Centers in urban locations, including Brooklyn, New York; East Los Angeles, California; Phoenix, Arizona; and Seattle, Washington.

=== Field guides ===
In 1934, with membership at a low of 3,500, and with the nation in the Great Depression, John H. Baker became the NAS president. He was a World War I aviator and ardent bird lover, and also a businessman, and he set about to invigorate the society and bolster its budget prosperity through publication. Baker began publishing book-length field guides on major forms of bird and mammal life. Soon, in association with New York publisher Alfred A. Knopf, the Audubon Field Guides became a staple of every artist's and environmentalist's library. Today, many Audubon field guides have been adapted for mobile phone apps. This field guide series covers a wide range of nature-related topics, including the night sky, rocks and minerals, wildflowers, and many animals. This series has sold 18 million copies and uses photographs instead of the commissioned paintings or other drawings that many other field guides possess, such as the Peterson Field Guides.

=== DDT, whaling, and politics ===
During the post–World War II period, the NAS was consumed by the battle over the pesticide DDT. As early as 1960, the society circulated draft legislation to establish pesticide control agencies at the state level. In 1962 the publication of the book Silent Spring by long-time Audubon member Rachel Carson gave the campaign against "persistent pesticides" a huge national forum. Following her death in 1964, the NAS established a fund devoted strictly to the various legal fights in the war against DDT.

Today, Audubon selects outstanding women in conservation to receive its prestigious Rachel Carson Award. Honorees include Bette Midler, singer, actress, and founder of the New York Restoration Project; Dr. Sylvia Earle, oceanographer and founder of Deep Search International; Majora Carter, founder and executive director of Sustainable South Bronx; actress and conservation activist Sigourney Weaver; and Natural Resources Defense Council president Frances Beinecke.

Through the 1960s and 1970s, the society began to use its influence to focus attention on a wider range of environmental issues and became involved in developing major new environmental protection policies and laws. Audubon staff and members helped legislators pass the Clean Air, Clean Water, Wild and Scenic Rivers, and Endangered Species acts. In 1969, the society opened an office in Washington, D.C., in an effort to keep legislators informed of Audubon's priorities.

By the 1970s, NAS had also extended to global interests. One area that NAS became actively involved with was whaling. Between 1973 and 1974 alone, the poorly regulated whaling industry had succeeded in harvesting 30,000 whales. But by 1985, following the 37th annual meeting of the International Whaling Commission in Bournemouth, England, which was attended by officials from the National Audubon Society and other U.S.-based environmental organizations, a worldwide moratorium on whaling was declared. So successful has this moratorium been in restoring populations of many whales, that "non-consumptive uses of whales" may once again be permitted in some areas.

=== Television specials ===
During the 1980s and 1990s, the National Audubon Society produced a notable series of nature documentary television specials, many of which were entitled The World of Audubon. These included specials on many animals other than birds (the traditional focus of this organization) and on natural areas such as the Great Lakes. This series included a special documenting the rescue efforts to save the black-footed ferret from extinction. Arthur Unger of The Christian Science Monitor reviewed this special very favorably and wrote that this special was "further proof that the Audubon series deserves a place in television's splendid wildlife triumvirate alongside Nature and National Geographic Specials".

=== Audubon Medal ===
The Audubon Medal is given in recognition of outstanding achievement in the field of conservation and environmental protection. 52 people have received the honor in Audubon's 108-year history.

== List of awardees ==
- 1947: Hugh Hammond Bennett
- 1949: Ira Noel Gabrielson
- 1950: John D. Rockefeller Jr.
- 1952: Louis Bromfield
- 1955: Walt Disney
- 1956: Ludlow Griscom
- 1959: Olaus Murie
- 1960: J.N. "Ding" Darling
- 1961: Clarence Cottam
- 1962: William O. Douglas
- 1963: Rachel Carson
- 1964: Laurance Rockefeller
- 1966: A. Starker Leopold
- 1967: Stewart Udall
- 1968: Henry Fairfield Osborn Jr.
- 1969: Horace M. Albright
- 1971: Roger Tory Peterson
- 1973: Barbara Ward (Lady Jackson, D.B.E.)
- 1974: Tom McCall
- 1975: Maurice F. Strong
- 1976: John B. Oakes
- 1977: Russell W. Peterson
- 1978: Charles H. Callison
- 1979: Thomas L. Kimball
- 1980: Margaret E. Murie
- 1981: Richard H. Pough
- 1982: C.R. "Pink" Gutermuth
- 1983: Margaret Wentworth Owings
- 1984: Joseph Hickey
- 1985: Cecil D. Andrus
- 1986: John F. Seiberling
- 1987: Vladimir E. Flint
- 1988: Oscar and Marguerita Arias
- 1989: Robert Redford
- 1990: Durward L. Allen
- 1991: Ted Turner
- 1992: John H. Chafee
- 1993: Chief Oren Lyons and Anita Roddick
- 1994: Jimmy Carter
- 1995: Edward O. Wilson
- 1996: James Parks Morton
- 1997: Hazel Wolf
- 1998: Julie Packard
- 1999: William Conway
- 2000: Chandler Robbins
- 2001: Michael Dombeck
- 2002: Edward H. Harte
- 2004: Harriet Bullitt
- 2005: The Rockefeller Family
- 2008: Richard Louv
- 2010: Donal C. O'Brien Jr.
- 2013: Louis Bacon
- 2015: Jack and Laura Dangermond
- 2016: Paul Tudor Jones II
- 2017: Frances Beinecke
- 2018: Sir David Attenborough
- 2019: Johnny Morris & Family

== Current activities ==
Audubon front lobby at its present headquarters in New York City, which earned a LEED Platinum designation for its green features

In 2011, Audubon created a new model for positioning energy transmission lines along the East Coast to help preserve bird and wildlife habitat. Audubon President David Yarnold has made environmentally friendly siting for renewable energy one of the organization's highest priorities.

Audubon played an important part in bird rescue and Gulf Coast wetlands recovery efforts in the aftermath of the April 20, 2010, BP oil spill in the Gulf of Mexico, the largest accidental marine oil spill in the history of the petroleum industry. Audubon recruited over 34,000 volunteers to assist in rescuing, cleaning and releasing injured brown pelicans and other water birds. In addition, Audubon was a leader in pushing for legislation to use BP oil spill penalties to rebuild the Gulf Coast.

Audubon's Mississippi River and Louisiana Coastal Initiatives have been helping to restore coastal wetlands and to rebuild Mississippi River delta marshlands. The Mississippi Delta loses an area the size of Manhattan to the sea every year, stripping away coastal protections for both human communities and wildlife habitat.

Audubon's Important Bird Area program has been protecting 370 million acres along migratory bird flyways in the United States and is a key part of Audubon's work with BirdLife International and other conservationists around the globe. Audubon is leading the campaign for U.S. Congressional Reauthorization of the Neotropical Migratory Bird Conservation Act which would generate as much as $100 million each year to advance hemispheric bird conservation.

In Wyoming and across the Intermountain west, Audubon's Sagebrush Initiative works with industry, government, ranchers and conservationists to protect 15 million acres of greater sage grouse Core habitat. It also helps promote the development of renewable energy projects in the area.

Audubon also helped to secure the preservation of 240,000 acres of wild lands at the Tejon Ranch, the largest land conservation area created in California history.

In March 2020, the Arkansas chapter of the Audubon Society announced its plan to spend $80,000 to install solar panels on its grounds, which will make their Little Rock office the state's first nonprofit to utilize 100% solar energy.

=== Sanctuaries and nature centers ===
Nature centers and wildlife sanctuaries continue to be an important part of Audubon's work to educate and inspire the public about the environment and how to conserve it. Some of the Audubon's earliest nature centers are still teaching young and old alike about the natural world. In 2016, Audubon's Hog Island Camp in Maine marked its 80th anniversary. Audubon's national network currently includes nearly 500 local chapters, 23 state programs, 41 nature centers. After nearly three-quarters of a century, the National Wildlife Refuge Campaign also remains a key component of overall NAS policy.

=== Conservation ranching initiative ===
Audubon has begun to certify bird-friendly ranching facilities, such as the Blue Nest Beef enterprise in order to provide consumers with a method of determining the environmental credentials of the businesses advertising that they are providing "bird-friendly", "grass-fed", and similar products, as options for beef that is raised sustainably and benefits wildlife habitat.

=== Native plants database ===
An online database is provided by Audubon that displays which native plants are important for birds in different areas that is searchable by USA zip code.

=== Invasive species ===
Audubon has recently expanded its outreach about the detrimental impact of invasive species like Norway maples, Tatarian honeysuckle and other ecological threats to human health and wildlife.

=== Drilling for natural gas ===
The Audubon society opposes drilling for gas on national reserves. Natural gas has been drilled for and produced at its Paul J. Rainey Wildlife Sanctuary. The society said it was legally compelled to allow gas and oil drilling at the sanctuary under the terms of the land's donation by its original owners. This explanation, however, has been challenged. The presence of oil and gas drilling on Audubon's sanctuaries has been used to illustrate the difference between private and public decision-making.

An August 26, 2009, an open letter was sent to the U.S. Senate Environment and Public Works Committee calling for stronger climate protections, including an end to subsidies for drilling companies. This signatories of this letter included the Central New Mexico Audubon Society, Champaign County Audubon Society, Delaware Audubon Society, Elisha Mitchell Audubon Society, Huachuca Audubon Society, Kalmiopsis Audubon Society, San Bernardino Valley Audubon Society, Sequoia Audubon Society, and Audubon South Carolina.

=== Dan W. Lufkin Prize for Environmental Leadership ===
The Dan W. Lufkin Prize for Environmental Leadership is a new award that recognizes Dan W. Lufkin's lifetime commitment to the environment and honors individuals who have dedicated their lives to on-the-ground conservation. As part of this award, the recipient receives a $100,000 cash prize, made through an endowment established by Dan's family and friends, to help further his or her conservation efforts. This award will become a signature prize in the field of conservation innovation. George Archibald was the inaugural Dan W. Lufkin Prize recipient for his tireless efforts to protect all species of cranes and their habitats throughout the world. The Wall Street Journal featured Dan W. Lufkin as the Donor of the Day, for the creation of this new Audubon prize.

=== Women in Conservation Program ===
The Rachel Carson Award is part of a broader Audubon initiative called Women in Conservation Project. Their mission statement is "To recognize outstanding women leaders in today's conservation movement; to support environmental opportunities for girls and young women; and to educate women on important issues related to conservation and the environment." Audubon New York created the Rachel Carson Field Internship in 2012, which is given to young women seeking experience in the fields of "habitat-stewardship and wildlife-management". There is also the Women in Conservation Fellowship. These internships are given to women who wish to learn about areas such as public relations, management, and event planning.

=== Climate change report ===
In September 2014, the Audubon Society released its Audubon Birds and Climate Change report which found that expected changes to North American climate will have a major, detrimental impact on birds in the United States. The scope of the report includes 588 species of birds and found that 314 of those species could lose up to half of their climatic range during the 21st century.

=== Namesake controversy ===
The society was named in honor of John James Audubon, a Franco-American ornithologist and naturalist who painted, cataloged, and described the birds of North America in his famous Birds of America book (1827–1838). Despite these accolades, John James Audubon's legacy has been tarnished by numerous accusations of plagiarism and scientific fraud, which his biographers (and Audubon's leadership) have routinely dismissed or minimized, even while admitting to his history of racism and slavery. John James Audubon collected human skulls to assist the scientific racism work of Samuel G. Morton. In the wake of the protests following the murder of George Floyd, there have been public appeals to strip the name Audubon from the society and change the names of species that honor him. The Audubon Society has publicly supported the removal of Confederate monuments, including acknowledging that "it's not just an issue of physical monuments".

An internal Board of Directors vote in 2023 resulted in a decision to retain the Audubon name for the national organization, with the subsequent resignation of three of its 26 board members. In February 2023, the union representing Audubon employees renamed itself The Bird Union. Seven months earlier, in July 2022, the Seattle chapter of Audubon announced it would change the name, and later announced the new name would be Birds Connect Seattle, effective June 2023. Shortly after the Seattle chapter's announcement in February, the Chicago chapter also announced it would change its name. In March 2023, the New York City chapter announced that after studying the issue for eight months, it would change its name; Jessica Wilson, executive director of the NYC chapter, stated that the current name "served as a barrier to getting all New Yorkers involved". Chapters in other cities such as Washington, D.C., Portland, Oregon, and Buffalo, New York, have made similar announcements.

Audubon organizations that have changed their names
Original name	Changed name	Date of change announcement	Ref.
Seattle Audubon	Birds Connect Seattle	July 21, 2022	
Audubon Naturalist Society (Washington, DC)	Nature Forward	October 20, 2022	
Madison Audubon	Southern Wisconsin Bird Alliance	February 17, 2023	
Portland Audubon (Oregon)	Bird Alliance of Oregon	February 28, 2023	
NYC Audubon	New York City Bird Alliance	March 20, 2023	
Buffalo Audubon Society	Trillium Nature Center	June 30, 2023	
Sacramento Audubon Society	Sacramento Bird Alliance	July 20, 2023	
Golden Gate Audubon (San Francisco area)	Golden Gate Bird Alliance	August 13, 2023	
San Diego Audubon	San Diego Bird Alliance	August 24, 2023	
Chicago Audubon Society	Chicago Bird Alliance	October 20, 2023	
Detroit Audubon	Detroit Bird Alliance	October 20, 2023	
Mount Diablo Audubon Society (California)	Mount Diablo Bird Alliance	November 3, 2023	
Georgia Audubon	Birds Georgia	November 29, 2023	
Jayhawk Audubon Society (Lawrence, Kansas)	Lawrence Bird Alliance	December 26, 2023	
Tahoma Audubon Society (Washington State)	Tahoma Bird Alliance	December 28, 2023	
Wintu Audubon Society (California)	Shasta Birding Society	January 1, 2024	
John Wesley Powell Audubon Society (Illinois)	Grand Prairie Bird Alliance	January 2, 2024	
South Bend-Elkhart Audubon Society (Indiana)	South Bend-Elkhart Bird Alliance	January 30, 2024	
Washtenaw Audubon Society (Michigan)	Washtenaw Bird & Nature Alliance	March 24, 2024	
Audubon Vermont UVM Chapter	UVM Birding Club	April 5, 2024	
Vashon-Maury Island Audubon Society (Washington state)	Vashon Bird Alliance	April 15, 2024	
DC Audubon Society (Washington, DC)	DC Bird Alliance	April 26, 2024	
New Hope Audubon (Chapel Hill, North Carolina)	New Hope Bird Alliance	May 2, 2024	
Southwestern New Mexico Audubon Society	Bird Alliance of Southwestern New Mexico	May 15, 2024	
Tucson Audubon Society	Tucson Bird Alliance	May 28, 2024	
Bitterroot Audubon (Montana)	Bitterroot Bird Alliance	May 29, 2024	
Audubon Society of Northern Virginia	Northern Virginia Bird Alliance	August 1, 2024	
Pomona Valley Audubon Society (California)	Pomona Valley Bird Alliance	August 26, 2024	
Lane County (Oregon) Audubon Society	Coast to Cascades Bird Alliance	September 11, 2024	
Audubon Society of Lincoln City (Oregon)	Seven Capes Bird Alliance	September 12, 2024	
Saint Paul Audubon Society (Minnesota)	Saint Paul Bird Alliance	October 7, 2024	
Audubon Chapter of Minneapolis (Minnesota)	Land of Lakes Bird Alliance	October 16, 2024	
Northwest Illinois Audubon Society	Northwest Illinois Bird & Nature Alliance	December 10, 2024	
Audubon Society of Corvallis (Oregon)	Mid-Willamette Bird Alliance	February 3, 2025	
AltaCal Audubon Society (California)	AltaCal Bird Alliance	December 1, 2024	
Santa Clara Valley Audubon Society (California)	Santa Clara Valley Bird Alliance	September 26, 2024	
Yolo Audubon Society (California)	Yolo Bird Alliance	September 26, 2024	
Fort Collins Audubon Society (Colorado)	Northern Colorado Bird Alliance	April 1, 2025	
Laughing Whitefish Audubon (Michigan)	Laughing Whitefish Bird Alliance	November 1, 2023	
Oakland Audubon Society (Michigan)	Oakland Bird Alliance	June 1, 2024	
Central New Mexico Audubon Society	Bird Alliance of Central New Mexico	January 1, 2024	
Wyncote Audubon Society (Pennsylvania)	Liberty Bird Alliance	November 27, 2024	
Charleston Audubon and Natural History Society (South Carolina)	Charleston Natural History Society	June 19, 2023	
Columbia Audubon Society (South Carolina)	Midlands Nature and Bird Alliance	January 15, 2025	
Admiralty Audubon Society (Washington)	Rainshadow Bird Alliance	November 1, 2024	
Northeastern Wisconsin Audubon Society	Northeastern Wisconsin Bird Alliance	November 1, 2024	
Fond du Lac County Audubon Society (Wisconsin)	Fond du Lac Area Bird & Nature Alliance	November 3, 2025	
Eastern Sierra Audubon Society (California)	Eastern Sierra Bird Alliance	October 2024	
Sacramento Audubon Society (California)	Sacramento Bird Alliance	June 20, 2026	
Houston Audubon Society (Texas)	Birds Houston	August 26, 2026	

== Leadership ==
David Yarnold became Audubon's 10th president in September 2010, expressing a commitment to build on the organization's strong conservation legacy and expand its commitment to improving the quality of life for both birds and people by aligning Audubon's conservation work along the migratory flyways that millions of birds travel each spring and fall. Following layoffs and complaints about diversity and inclusion programs, an Audubon union organizing drive went public in March 2021 with about 400 workers. Yarnold stepped down the next month following an internal audit into Audubon's workplace culture and toxic workplace complaints. Elizabeth Gray was named Audubon's CEO in November, 2021.

== Audubon magazine ==
The National Audubon Society publishes a bi-monthly magazine called Audubon.

== See also ==
- Environmental history of the United States
- List of environmental awards
- NatureShare (2009)

== General Reference ==
- Audubon New York, 1995-2002. M.E. Grenander Department of Special Collections and Archives, University Libraries, University at Albany, State University of New York (hereafter referred to as the Audubon New York).
