= Burr, Egan, Deleage & Co. =

- Type: Private ownership
- Industry: Private equity,
- Founded: 1979
- Founder: Craig Burr, William P. Egan, and Dr. Jean Deleage, Ph.D.
- Defunct: 1996
- Fate: Dissolved
- Successor: Alta Communications, Alta Partners, Alta Berkeley Capital, Polaris Venture Partners
- Headquarters: Boston, Massachusetts, United States
- Products: Venture capital

Burr, Egan, Deleage & Co. (BEDCO) was a venture capital firm which focused on investments in information technology, communications, and healthcare/biotechnology companies.

BEDCO was one of the first venture capital firm to set up a bi-coastal operation with a presence in both Boston, Massachusetts and Silicon Valley in California.

The firm was founded in 1979 and dissolved in 1996, with Alta Partners and Alta Communications assuming management responsibility for certain existing investments. Other successor firms include Polaris Venture Partners and Alta Berkeley.

== History ==
The firm was founded in 1979 by Craig Burr, William P. Egan, and Dr. Jean Deleage, Ph.D. Burr and Egan had worked together at the pioneering private equity firm TA Associates. Deleage had come from Sofinnova Partners, a venture capital firm in France that he had co-founded in 1971. In 1976, Deleage had founded Sofinnova’s US affiliate, based in San Francisco. At its zenith the company managed over $700 million in assets and today is the direct predecessor of four venture capital firms with aggregate capital in excess of $5.7 billion:

- Polaris Venture Partners based in Waltham, Massachusetts
- Alta Partners based in California
- Alta Communications based in Boston
- Alta Berkeley Capital based in London.

Among BEDCO’s most notable investments were Continental Cablevision with H. Irving Grousbeck, Qwest with Philip Anschutz, Cephalon, American Superconductor and SyQuest Technology.

== Investment funds ==
From its founding in 1979 through its dissolution in 1996, BEDCO raised more than a dozen venture capital funds with total investor commitments of approximately $700 million.

- 1980 - $12m - Alta Company
- 1982 - $60m - Alta II (Late Stage)
- 1982 - $10m - Alta Berkeley Venture Partners (Bal. Stage)
- 1983 - $18m - Alta Berkeley LP Liquidating Trust (Early Stage)
- 1984 - $15.7m - Alta Berkeley Eurofund (Early Stage)
- 1986 - $45m - Alta Subordinated Debt (Mezzanine)
- 1986 - $32.3m - Alta Berkeley L.P. II (Early Stage)
- 1988 - $35m - Alta Communications IV (Late Stage)
- 1988 - $124m - Alta IV (Late Stage)
- 1988 - $68m - Alta Subordinated Debt II (Mezzanine)
- 1992 - $161m - Alta V
- 1993 - $96m - Alta Subordinated Debt III (Mezzanine)
- 1993 - $27m - Alta Berkeley III (Early Stage)

== Successor firms ==
=== Polaris Venture Partners ===
Polaris Venture Partners was the first of four successors to BEDCO. One of the contributing factors in the dissolution was the departure of three of BEDCO’s junior partners, Jon Flint, Terry McGuire, and Steve Arnold. The three founders, left BEDCO in 1995 and began raising their first independent venture capital fund. Today, Polaris Venture Partners is a venture capital firm specializing in seed and early stage investments particularly in companies engaged in the information technology and life sciences sectors. Polaris is based in Waltham, Massachusetts with an additional office in Seattle, Washington.

Since 1995, Polaris has raised five venture capital funds with over $2.6 billion of investor commitments. To date, all of the Polaris funds have been above average performers for their respective vintage years. Polaris Venture Partners V, which was closed in 2006, raised $1 billion of investor commitments.

=== Alta Partners ===
Alta Partners was founded by BEDCO co-founder Dr. Jean Deleage, Ph.D., along with Garrett Gruener, a former partner at BEDCO. Today, the firm, which is based in San Francisco, invests in biotechnology and life science companies and has made over 130 investments since its separation from BEDCO.

Since 1996, Alta has raised eight venture capital funds including four funds in its Alta California Funds series, three funds in its Alta Biopharma Partners series and most recently in 2006, Alta raised Alta Partners VIII with $500 million of investor commitments

=== Alta Communications ===
Alta Communications was founded by BEDCO co-founders Craig Burr and William P. Egan. Today the firm, which is based in Waltham, Massachusetts (just outside Boston), invests primarily in later-stage opportunities in the traditional media and telecommunications sectors.

Since 1996, Alta Communications has raised four venture capital funds with over $1.4 billion of investor commitments.

=== Alta Berkeley ===
Alta Berkeley was formed from BEDCO’s European operations. In 1982, Bryan Wood, who had been working in corporate finance in Britain, partnered with BEDCO to establish a presence in Europe. Today, Alta Berkeley makes early stage investments in technology companies based in Europe and Israel. Alta Berkeley's sixth and most recent fund raised approximately $145 million of investor commitments.
