= Flint (disambiguation) =

Flint is a type of rock.

Flint may also refer to:

== Places ==
=== United States ===
- Flint, Georgia, an unincorporated community
- Flint, Indiana, an unincorporated community
- Flint, Kentucky, a former unincorporated community
- Flint, Michigan, a city
- Flint, Ohio, an unincorporated community
- Flint, Texas, an unincorporated community
- Flint, West Virginia, an unincorporated community
- Flint Township, Pike County, Illinois
- Flint Township, Michigan, a charter township
- Flint Township, North Dakota, a township in Stutsman County, North Dakota
- Flint Hills, a physiographic region located in Kansas and Oklahoma
- Flint River (disambiguation), several
- Flint Creek (Alabama)
- Flint Creek (Arkansas/Oklahoma)
- Flint Creek (New York)
- The Flint, a neighborhood in Fall River, Massachusetts

=== Wales ===
- Flint, Flintshire, a town
  - Flint Castle
- Flintshire (historic), also known as the County of Flint, one of Wales' thirteen historic counties and a former administrative county

=== Elsewhere ===
- Flint Island, an uninhabited atoll in the Pacific Ocean under the jurisdiction of Kiribati
- Flint Ridge, Victoria Land, Antarctica

== People ==
- Flint (surname)
- Flint (given name)

== Arts and entertainment ==
=== Fictional characters ===
- Flint (G.I. Joe), in the G.I. Joe universe
- Flint (Marvel Comics), an Inhuman character appearing in Marvel Comics
- Flint (Mother 3), a playable character in Nintendo's Mother 3
- Flint, the protagonist in the Cluster series, by Piers Anthony
- Flint, the immortal antagonist in the episode "Requiem for Methuselah" of the original Star Trek series
- Flint, Ruth and Kate Galloway's cat in Elly Griffiths' Ruth Galloway novel series
- Derek Flint, protagonist of the spy movie Our Man Flint and its sequels
- Marcus Flint, in the Harry Potter books
- Captain Flint, a character in the novel Treasure Island by Robert Louis Stevenson; a parrot named for him also appears in the book
- Flint Fireforge, a dwarf in the Dragonlance chronicles
- Flint Hammerhead, in the Japanese animated television series Flint the Time Detective
- Ms. Flint, a character in the 2001 Disney/Pixar animated film Monsters, Inc.
- Flint Lockwood, the main character of the film Cloudy with a Chance of Meatballs
- Sandman (Marvel Comics), aka Flint Marko

=== Music ===
- Flint (band)
- Flint, a late 1970s rock band from Flint, Michigan, formed by ex-Grand Funk Railroad musicians Don Brewer, Mel Schacher and Craig Frost

=== Other arts and entertainment ===
- Flint (film), a 2017 TV film about the Flint water crisis
- Flint (2020 film), a 2020 documentary about the Flint water crisis

== Computing ==
- FLINT, Fast Library for Number Theory

== Ships ==
- USS Flint (AE-32), later USNS Flint (T-AE-32), an ammunition ship commissioned in 1971
- USS Flint (CL-64), a light cruiser commissioned in 1944 as USS Vincennes
- USS Flint (CL-97), a cruiser of World War II

== Sports ==
- IL Flint, a Norwegian football club
  - Flint Tønsberg, a women's handball team
- Flint Metro League, a high school sports league in the Flint area of Michigan

== Transportation ==
- Flint (automobile), a Durant automobile from the 1920s named after Flint, Michigan, United States
- Flint Automobile Company, an early car company from the 1900's founded by Alexander Brownell Cullen Hardy
- Flint railway station, Flint, Wales, United Kingdom

== Other uses ==
- Flint Deanery, a Roman Catholic deanery in the Diocese of Wrexham in Wales
- Flint Global, a British international business advisory firm
- Flint Group, a manufacturing company based in Luxembourg
- Flint Laboratory, an academic building and former dairy laboratory at the University of Massachusetts Amherst
- Flint School, a former preparatory school in Sarasota, Florida, United States
- Flint (theatre), Amersfoort, Netherlands
- Flint, a chimpanzee that was featured in several books and documentaries
- Chalicosis, also called Flint disease
- Ferrocerium, spark producing metal in cigarette lighters
- Flint Water Crisis, a health crisis in Flint, Michigan

== See also ==
- Flynt (disambiguation)
