= Grifter =

A grifter is a scammer. The term may also refer to:

== Arts and entertainment ==
- Grifters (band), a 1990s American indie rock band
- The Grifters (novel), a 1963 American novel by Jim Thompson
- The Grifters (film), a 1990 American adaptation of the novel
- Grifter (character), a comic book superhero from Image Comics and DC Comics

== Other uses ==
- No. 84 Squadron RAF (call sign: GRIFTER), a British search and rescue air squadron
- Raleigh Grifter, an English children's bicycle made by Raleigh 1976–1983

== See also ==
- The Grifter's Hymnal, a 2012 album by American Ray Wylie Hubbard
- Tachigui: The Amazing Lives of the Fast Food Grifters, a 2006 Japanese film directed by Mamoru Oshii
- Grift
- Hustle (disambiguation)
