= Flintstone =

Flintstone may refer to:

- Flint, a type of stone, sometimes called flintstone
- Flintstone, Georgia
- Flintstone, Maryland
- Flintstone, Tasmania, a locality in Australia
- The Flintstones, an animated television show and related productions
  - The Flintstones (1988 video game)
  - The Flintstones (1993 video game), a 1993 video game based on the animated television show
  - The Flintstones (pinball)
  - The Flintstones (film), a 1994 live action film based on the animated television show
  - Flintstones Chewable Vitamins, supplemental multivitamins for children based on the animated television show
  - The Flintstones (2016 comic book)
  - Flintstonization, a term coined in the book The Opening of the American Mind: Canons, Culture, and History by Lawrence W. Levine, and expanded upon in Sex at Dawn regarding the projecting of modern assumptions and beliefs onto earlier societies.

== See also ==
- Flint (disambiguation)
