= Jean Deleage =

Jean Deleage (1940–2011) was an early venture capital investor responsible for the founding or co-founding of three notable venture capital firms since 1971: Sofinnova, Burr, Egan, Deleage & Co. and Alta Partners.

== Career ==
Deleage began investing in venture capital in 1971 with the formation of Sofinnova (officially founded in 1972). Five years later, in 1976, Deleage founded Sofinnova’s US business, based in San Francisco, Sofinnova, Inc. In 1997, when Sofinnova split into two firms, the US business would come to be known as Sofinnova Ventures.

In 1979, Deleage, who worked left Sofinnova to co-found a new, bi-coastal venture capital firm Burr, Egan, Deleage & Co. (BEDCO), with Craig Burr and William P. Egan, who had worked together at TA Associates. BEDCO was one of the largest and most active venture capital firms in the 1980s and early 1990s. Deleage and BEDCO were early investors in a number of notable venture backed companies including Cephalon, Chiron and Genentech. Additionally, Deleage facilitated a significant partnership between BEDCO and Sofinnova, leading to a number of co-investments.

BEDCO invested in information technology, communications, and healthcare/biotechnology companies, and at its zenith managed $700 million in assets. The principals of BEDCO separated in 1995 and 1996, leading Deleage to found Alta Partners along with Garrett Gruener, a former partner at BEDCO. Alta Partners is one of several successors to BEDCO founded in the mid-1990s and has raised over $1.9 billion of investor commitments since inception.

== Education ==
Jean received a master's degree in Electrical Engineering from the École Supérieure d'Électricité and a Ph.D. in Economics from the Sorbonne.

== Other affiliations ==
In 1984, Dr. Deleage was awarded the Ordre National du Merite. In 1993, Deleage was also awarded the Legion of Honor by the French government in recognition of his career accomplishments.

Deleage was a member of the board of directors of Rigel Pharmaceuticals, Inc., TorreyPines Therapeutics, Inc. and several private companies.
