= Alta Communications =

American private equity firm

- Type: Private ownership
- Industry: Private equity
- Predecessor: Burr, Egan, Deleage & Co.
- Founded: 1996
- Founder: Craig Burr, William P. Egan
- Headquarters: 28 State Street; Boston, Massachusetts, United States
- Products: Venture capital
- Website: altacomm.com

Alta Communications was an American private equity firm primarily working with media and the communication sector.

Their equity funds are invested in about 100 companies.

== History ==
Alta Communications was formed in late 1996 as part of the dissolution of Burr, Egan, Deleage & Co. (BEDCO), an early venture capital firm that had been founded in 1979.

In 2005, Alta Communications ceased relations with Alta Partners, based in San Francisco.

Two years later, Alta Communications entered into a partnership with Paul Mackler and Kenneth Fisher. Together, the partnership acquired HMP Communications, an educational resource for healthcare professionals.

== See also ==
- Burr, Egan, Deleage & Co.
- Alta Partners
- Polaris Venture Partners
