= Robert Flint =

Robert Flint may refer to:

- Robert Flint (theologian) (1838–1910), Scottish theologian and philosopher
- Robert Flint (MP) (fl. 1547), MP for Thirsk
- Robert F. Flint, North Dakota Republican Party politician
- Bob Flint, American ceramic artist
- Robert Flynt of Gray's Inn

== See also ==
- Robert Flynn (disambiguation)
