= Jonathan Flint =

Jonathan Flint may refer to

- Jon Flint (born 1951), American venture capitalist
- Jonathan Flint (scientist), British geneticist and academic

== See also ==
- John Flint (disambiguation)
