= Flynt (disambiguation) =

Flynt is a surname.

Flynt may also refer to:

- Flynt Building, Chandler, Oklahoma, USA; an NHRP-listed building
- Flynt Quarry, Monson, Massachusetts, USA; a granite quarry
- Flynt Publications, which runs the Hustler adult entertainment empire founded by Larry Flynt

== See also ==
- Works related to Bethlehem Motors Corporation v. Flynt at Wikisource
- Barbi v. Flynt, where the Barbi Twins sued Larry Flynt and Hustler magazine for unauthorized use of Playboy photos of them
- Flynt v Falwell, where Reverend Falwell sued Larry Flynt and Hustler Magazine
- The People vs. Larry Flynt, 1996 film directed by Miloš Forman
- Melvin Flynt – Da Hustler, the second solo studio album by rapper Noreaga
- Hustler (disambiguation), for other Larry Flynt—Hustler topics
- Flint (disambiguation)
