= Amy Schulman =

American businessperson

Amy Weinfeld Schulman is an American healthcare biotech venture capitalist, trained as a lawyer, who serves as a managing partner at Polaris Partners. She focuses on investing in healthcare companies and early-stage biotech start-ups. She chairs the Board of Directors for Alnylam Pharmaceuticals (NASDAQ: ALNY) and is on the board of directors for Elevance Health (NYSE: ELV). She also practiced as a lawyer.

== Early life and education ==
Both her parents practiced law and were the first in their families to attend college. Her mother, Ann, graduated from Law School at the age of 45 and her father after he had served in the US Coast Guards.

She is a Phi Beta Kappa graduate of Wesleyan University, where she received a joint degree in Philosophy and English, and she obtained her J.D. from Yale Law School.

== Career ==
Amy currently serves as a managing partner at Polaris Partners, which focuses on investing in healthcare companies and early-stage biotech start-ups. She also co-founded the Polaris Innovation Fund, which she has managed since its inception in 2017. She serves as chair of the Board of Directors of Alnylam Pharmaceuticals (NASDAQ: ALNY) and is on the board of directors for Elevance Health (NYSE: ELV). She also represents Polaris as a director on various boards, including QurAlis, and Larkspur.

Before joining Polaris in 2014, Amy held various roles at Pfizer, beginning with general counsel and moving to the business side as president of Pfizer Nutrition and president of Pfizer Consumer Healthcare. Prior to her tenure at Pfizer, she practiced law as a partner at DLA Piper and began her career in litigation at Cleary Gottlieb Steen & Hamilton in 1991.

== Philanthropy ==
Amy is active in philanthropic circles and also serves on the Boards of Action Against Hunger, Mount Sinai Hospital (where she co-chairs the Innovations Committee), the California Institute of Technology, and the President's Advisory Council of Break Through Cancer. She is a member of Singapore's Health and Biomedical Sciences International Advisory Council and the LifeSci NYC Advisory Council.

== Recognition ==
Amy has received numerous awards, including the Margaret Brent Women Lawyers of Achievement Award, Scientific American's Worldview 100 List, Fierce Biotech's Top 15 Women in Biotech, and Fortune Magazine's 50 Most Powerful Women in Business.

== Personal life ==
Amy is married to David Nachman, and together, they have three children. Amy and David reside in Brooklyn, New York.
