= John Flint =

John Flint may refer to:

- John Flint (footballer) (1919–2007), Australian rules footballer
- John Flint (businessman) (born 1968), British banking businessman
- John Flint Cahan (1889–1928), Canadian politician
- John Flint Kidder (1830–1901), American politician
- John Flint South (1797–1882), English surgeon
- John E. Flint, Canadian historian

== See also ==
- Jonathan Flint (disambiguation)
- John Flynt
