= Paul J. Rainey Wildlife Sanctuary =

Protected area in Louisiana, United States

Coordinates: 29.606°N 92.195°W

The Paul J. Rainey Wildlife Sanctuary is a 26,000-acre (110 km^{2}) refuge owned by the National Audubon Society in Vermilion Parish, Louisiana. Established in 1924, this private Louisiana sanctuary is home to alligator, deer, muskrat, otter, geese and many other species. Because of the focus to maintain safe, secure and healthy habitats for waterfowl and other endemic wildlife, it is not open to the public, and no hunting or fishing is permitted within the Sanctuary boundaries. There are no roads to the Sanctuary, and boat access through the private canals is by permission only. It is currently managed by the National Audubon Society.
