= Flinth =

Flinth is a surname. Notable people with the surname include:

- Alf Flinth (1897–1982), Norwegian footballer
- Peter Flinth (born 1964), Danish film director

== See also ==
- Flint (surname)
