= Kauikeaouli Hale =

District courthouse for the Island of Oʻahu in Hawaii

Coordinates: 21°18′32″N 157°51′31″W

Kauikeaouli Hale is a district courthouse for the Island of Oʻahu in Hawaii.

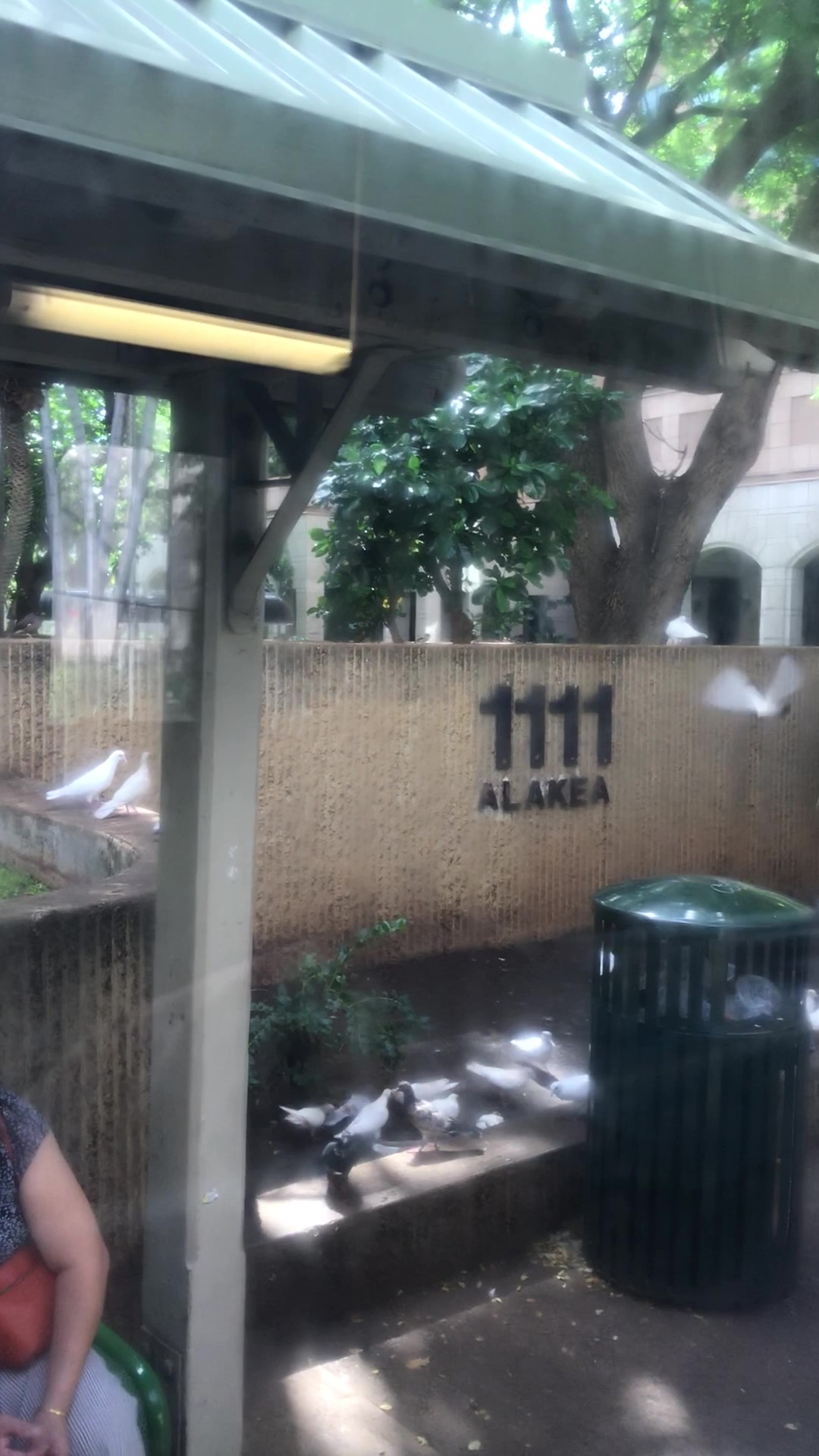
Bus stop in front of 1111 Alakea Street in downtown Honolulu

It is located at 1111 Alakea Street between downtown Honolulu and the Hawaii Capital Historic District at . Its lower floors house the courts of the first circuit, covering the City and County of Honolulu, and upper floors have offices of some support departments of the Hawaii Supreme Court. It is adjacent to the Hawaii State Art Museum.

On August 18, 2023, the building was closed due to structural damages.

In the Hawaiian language, hale means "house" and Kauikeaouli was the birth name of the Kingdom of Hawaii’s King Kamehameha III (1813–1854). The art displayed at Kauikeaouli Hale includes:

- Aged Tree, a 1976 wood, copper and bronze sculpture by Satoru Abe
- Bear and Cubs, a 1973 black granite sculpture by Benny Bufano
- Hawaiian Mountain Series I, a 1974 ceramic sculpture by Bob Flint
- My Father's Eyes Have Seen What I Dreamed, a 1971 ceramic, wood and resin sculpture by Donald Harvey
- Family Structure, a 1971 wood sculpture by Ken Shutt
