= David Yarnold =

American environmentalist

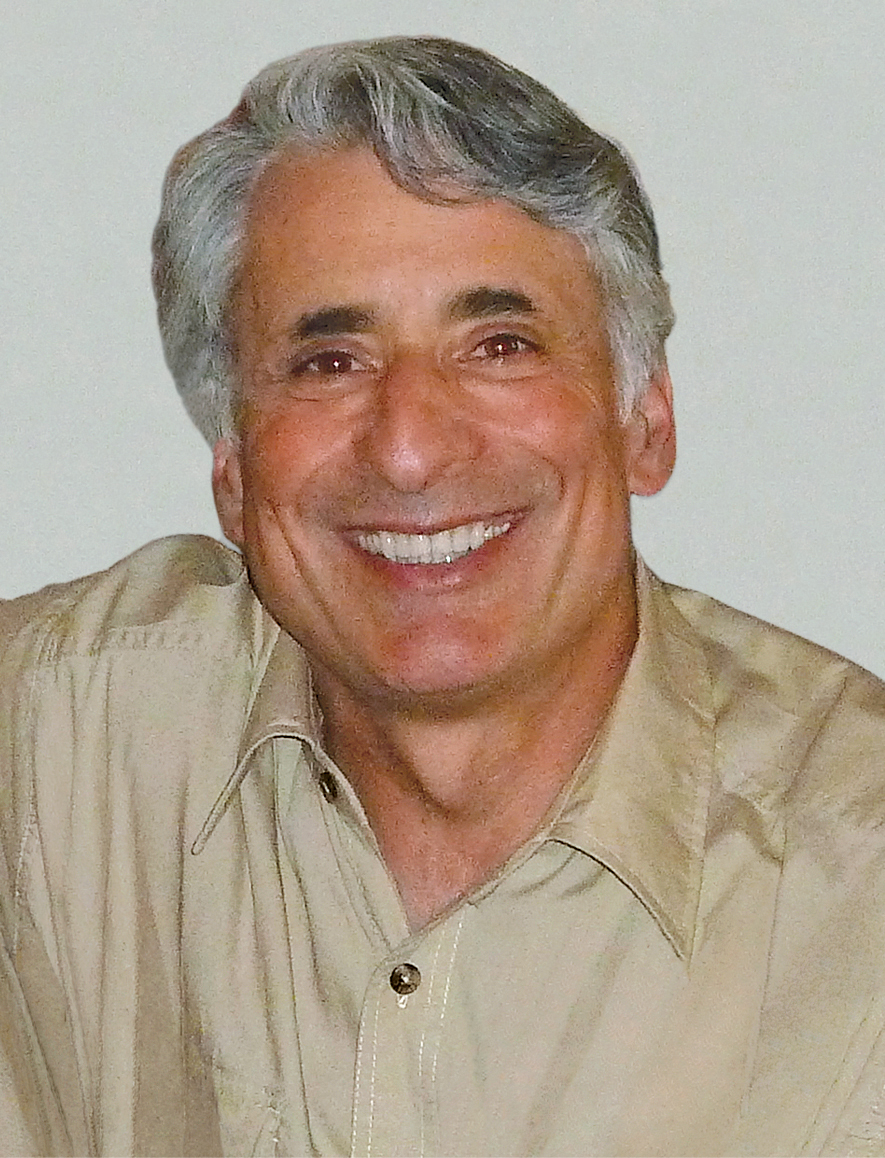
- David Yarnold
- Born: November 26, 1952 (age 73); Los Angeles, California,
- Citizenship: United States
- Education: San Jose State University (1976)
- Spouse: Fran Smith
- Children: 2

David Yarnold (born November 26, 1952) is the former president and CEO of the National Audubon Society. He became the conservation organization's 10th president in September, 2010.

== Biography ==
He was born in Los Angeles, California, and earned a B.A. degree at San Jose State University in 1976. In 2005 he moved from San Jose to Dobbs Ferry, New York where he lives with his wife, freelance writer Fran Smith, and their daughter, Nicole. He has a son, Adam, in New York City.

== National Audubon Society ==
Yarnold is a believer in the power of social media which he believes will lead to, "a younger, more diverse audience to help us create the Audubon of the future . . . This isn't your grandmother's Audubon anymore" He oversees Audubon's Important Bird Area program, and Audubon's flyways based approach to conservation developed under his leadership. Yarnold has also been vocal about the need for climate change action and is an advocate for Gulf restoration. In November 2020, Yarnold was hit by claims of "intimidation and threats" according to an article posted on Politico.

== San Jose Mercury News ==
He joined the San Jose Mercury News as photo editor in 1978, and Yarnold eventually became the paper's editor and senior vice president. During his time there, he was influential in raising awareness about diversity in the journalism professions: he created "Time Out for Diversity and Accuracy" for the Associated Press Managing Editors Association and the Diversity Leadership Institute for the American Society of Newspaper Editors. While assistant managing editor of paper's afternoon edition, the San Jose Mercury News won a Pulitzer Prize for general reporting for its coverage of the 1989 Loma Prieta earthquake. An investigation into local government corruption in 2004 led to his selection as one of three finalists for the 2005 Pulitzer Prize in editorial writing.

== Environmental Defense Fund ==
Yarnold began working at the Environment Defense Fund in 2005; in 2008 he was promoted to executive director and president of the Environmental Defense Action Fund, the group's legislative arm. In that role, he focused on corporate environmental practices and market-based approaches to greenhouse-gas reduction in China, co-led the EDF's joint authorship of California's AB32, the Global Warming Solutions Act of 2006, and co-chaired the founding committee of the United States Climate Action Partnership (USCAP), a coalition of businesses and environmental organizations promoting national climate change legislation.

== Recognition and honors ==
Yarnold is the recipient of the Ida B. Wells Award for Diversity (2003), the Catalyst Award for Diversity Leadership (2003), the Edom award for Inspirational Leadership (1998), and numerous journalism prizes, including the National Headliner Award for editorial writing (2005). He helped direct The Mercury News Pulitzer Prize-winning coverage of the 1989 Loma Prieta earthquake and was one of three finalists for the Pulitzer Prize in editorial writing in 2005. Under his leadership, The Mercury News was named one of the five best designed newspapers in the world and called "America's Boldest Newspaper."

His article "Don’t Throw Bald Eagles Under the Bus" appeared on the April 12th, 2016 SAT test as the prompt for the student-produced essay response.

== Articles and publications ==
Yarnold publishes frequent opinion pieces on energy policy, bird conservation and other environmental topics, and is a contributor to The Huffington Post and Audubon magazine's blog "The Perch". He has been featured by news sources such as CNN, NPR, BBC, PBS, MSNBC, Politico Magazine and The New York Times.
