= Hustler =

Hustler or hustlers may refer to:

== Occupations ==
- Hustler, an American slang word, e.g., for a:
  - Con artist, a practitioner of confidence tricks
  - Drug dealer, seller of illegal drugs
  - Male prostitute
  - Pimp
  - Business man, more generally, possibly self-employed or self-made
- Hustler, a con artist who deceives people into betting at a disadvantage, usually in games of skill or sports

== Arts, entertainment, and media ==
=== Films ===
- The Hustler (1920 film), a German silent film starring Hans Albers
- The Hustler, a 1961 American film adaptation of the Tevis novel starring Paul Newman as Felson
- The Hustlers, a 2010 Finnish comedy film
- Hustlers, an alternate name of the 2013 film Pawn Shop Chronicles
- Hustlers (film), a 2019 American crime drama film starring Constance Wu and Jennifer Lopez

=== Literature ===
- The Hustler, English title of a 1926 German novel by John Henry Mackay
- The Hustler (novel), a 1959 American novel by Walter Tevis about pool hustler Edward "Fast Eddie" Felson

=== Music ===
- "Hustler" (song), a 2006 house music single by Simian Mobile Disco
- "Hustler", a song by Blackbear on the album Help
- "Hustler", a song by Kano on the album 140 Grime St
- "Hustler", a song by K.Flay on the album Mono
- "Hustla", 2019 single by Kash Doll
- "Hustlers", a song from the 2006 album Hip Hop Is Dead by American rapper Nas
- The Hustler (album), a 1968 salsa album by Willie Colón
- The Hustlers, performers on the soundtrack for the 1965 horror film The Beach Girls and the Monster

=== Other uses in arts, entertainment, and media ===
- Hustler (magazine), an American men's pornographic magazine published by Larry Flynt Publications

- Hustler Club, a chain of bars and go-go clubs using the brand name licensed by Larry Flynt

- "The Hustler" (Porridge), an episode of the BBC sitcom Porridge
- The Hustler, a 1950s painting by the American artist Arthur Sarnoff (1912–2000)
- The Hustler (American game show), a 2021 television program hosted by Craig Ferguson
- The Vanderbilt Hustler, the main student newspaper of Vanderbilt University

== People ==
- Abby Hustler (born 2003), Canadian ice hockey player
- John Hustler (1715–1790), English Quaker wool-stapler
- Len Hustler (1920–1981), Australian rules footballer
- James Devereux Hustler (1784–1849), English cleric and academic
- Tom Hustler (1934–2006), English society photographer
- William Hustler (c.1658–1730), English draper

== Transportation and vehicles ==
- Hustler, a train of the Southern Pacific, between Dallas and Houston
- Marine Heavy Helicopter Squadron 772, a US Marines unit nicknamed "The Hustlers"

=== Airplanes ===
- Convair B-58 Hustler, an American supersonic jet bomber that first flew in 1956
- Gulfstream American Hustler, a small American aircraft produced from 1978 to 1981

=== Automobiles and motorcycles ===
- Hustler (car), a kit car designed in 1978
- Hustler, a line of car wheels manufactured by American Racing in the 2000s
- Hustler, motorcycles produced by American firm Rupp Industries in the early 1970s
- Hustler, a line of Suzuki motorcycles produced from 1965 to 1981
- Suzuki Hustler, a kei car introduced in 2014

== Other uses ==
- Hustler, Wisconsin, a village in Juneau County, Wisconsin, United States
- Hustler Casino, Gardena, California, USA

== See also ==
- Melvin Flynt – Da Hustler (aka "Da Hustler", "Hustler"), 1999 album by Noreaga
- Hustler Magazine v. Falwell
- Hustle (disambiguation)
- Shyster
- Flynt (disambiguation), including other Larry Flynt-Hustler topics
