= Ken Shutt =

American artist

- Born: 1928; Long Beach, California, United States
- Died: April 2, 2010 (aged 81–82); Atascadero, California, United States
- Education: Pasadena City College, Art Center College of Design, Chouinard Art Institute
- Occupation: Visual artist
- Known for: Watercolors, bronze sculptures

Coconuts by Ken Shutt, 1972, watercolor, Waialae Country Club

Ken Shutt (1928 – April 2, 2010) was an American sculptor and watercolorist. He was active in California and Hawaii.

== Life ==
Ken Shutt was born 1928, in Long Beach, California. He grew up in Whittier, California. Shutt graduated from Pasadena City College, the Art Center College of Design, and the Chouinard Art Institute.

He moved to Hawaii in 1963, and lived there until 1995. He returned to California in 1995, to be near his foundry, when he was commissioned to create a bronze sculpture for the entrance of Sea Life Park Hawaii. His best known paintings are watercolors of Hawaii's flora (see image). His sculptures often combine such diverse materials as resin, wood, terrazzo, bronze, and granite.

He died 2010, at age 81, in Atascadero, California.

== Collections ==
The Honolulu Museum of Art and the Hawaii State Art Museum are among the public collections holding work by Ken Shutt. His sculptures in public places include:

- A granite and bronze sculpture at the Kauaʻi Performing Arts Center, Lihue, Hawaii.
- Untitled 1976 sculpture, Leilehua High School, Honolulu, Hawaii
- Waialua, 1976, Waialua High and Intermediate School, Waialua, Hawaii
- Konohiki, 1980-1981, King Intermediate School, Kaneohe, Hawaii
- Celebrating the Arts, 1999, Kauaʻi Community College, Kauaʻi, Hawaii
- Heritage Growing, 1975, Laupahoehoe High and Elementary School, Laupahoehoe, Hawaii
- Lanai Ohana, 1977, Lanai High and Elementary School, Lanai City, Hawaii
- Kauaʻi Ola, 1981, Kauaʻi High School, Lihue, Hawaii
- Hawaiian Porpoises, 1976, Honolulu Zoo, Honolulu, Hawaii
- Family Structure, 1971, Kauikeaouli Hale (courthouse), Honolulu, Hawaii
- Matrix, 1990, Hilo High School, Hilo, Hawaii
- Four Valleys, 1978, Waianae High School, Waianae, Hawaii
- Konohiki, 1973, Hawaii State Art Museum sculpture garden
- Bird in Flight, 1969, American Savings Bank Kapiolani Branch, Honolulu, Hawaii
