= Craig Burr =

American venture capitalist

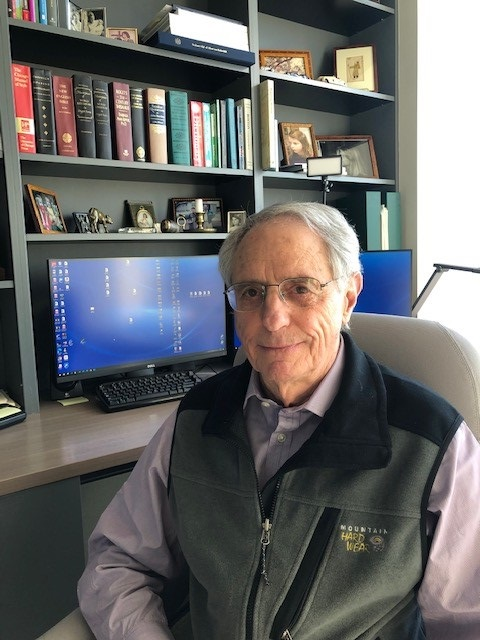
Craig Burr

Craig L. Burr (born 1945) is an early venture capital investor, notable for his role in the founding of two venture capital firms, Burr, Egan, Deleage & Co. (BEDCO) in 1979 and Alta Communications in 1996.

== Career ==
In 1979 Burr co-founded Burr, Egan, Deleage & Co. (BEDCO), one of the earliest bi-coastal venture capital firms in the US, along with William P. Egan and Dr. Jean Deleage. Prior to founding BEDCO, Burr was a partner at early venture firm TA Associates with BEDCO co-founder William Egan.

BEDCO invested in information technology, communications, and healthcare/biotechnology companies, and at its zenith managed $700 million in assets. The principals of BEDCO separated in 1995 and 1996, leading Burr and Egan to co-found Alta Communications. Alta is one of several successors to BEDCO founded in the mid-1990s and has raised over $1.4 billion of investor commitments since inception.

== Affiliations ==
Burr was a founder of the New England Venture Capital Association and has served on its board of directors. He also serves on the Boards of Directors of several private companies and non-profit organizations.

Burr currently also serves a limited partner of a number of emerging venture capital firms including Nobska Partners, the Blackethouse Group, 8 Wire Capital, Geminus Capital Partners, Rational Equity, Bartley Capital, Wright Equity Partners, Caldera Capital Partners, Blue Horizon Capital, Venatus Capital Partners, Granite Creek Capital, Black Mountain Equity, Sentinel Peak Capital, Rushmore Partners, Blue Canyon Capital and Johns Creek Partners.

== Education ==
Burr received his BA, cum laude, from Harvard College and his MBA from Harvard Business School.
