= Logicraft =

Enable DEC minicomputers to run PC software

Logicraft was an American software company founded in 1975 and based in New Hampshire. The company's products enabled Digital Equipment Corporation (DEC) minicomputers to run PC software (such as Lotus 123). It was acquired by Microtest of Phoenix, Arizona, in December 1996.

== Overview ==
Augmenting a DEC VAX or PDP-11 multi-user minicomputer with a Logicraft MS-DOS "card" that itself is multi-user allowed a person sitting at a simple terminal to run PC applications. This provided "controlled access to PC resources without putting both a PC and a VT terminal on every desk top." As of mid-1988, Logicraft and another firm, Virtual Microsystems Inc (VMI) were "the only commercially available products that let VAX/VMS systems run standard off-the-shelf PC applications from terminals and VAXstations."

Logicraft's Omniware was a combined hardware/software offering. Some users went beyond running PC applications and used serially shared CD-ROM access.
