= Grift =

Grift may refer to:

- Confidence trick

== Arts and entertainment ==
- The Grift, a 2008 novel by American author Debra M. Ginsberg
- The Grift, a 2008 American movie starring Sara Downing
- "The Grift", an episode of Mutant X, a Canadian/American science-fiction television series

== Places ==
- Grift (Fossa Eugeniana), a canal in North Rhine-Westphalia, Germany
- Grift (IJssel), a tributary of river IJssel in Gelderland, Netherlands

== People ==
- Evert Grift (1922–2009), Dutch cyclist
- Fanny Van de Grift Osbourne (1840–1914), wife of Robert Louis Stevenson
- Henk van der Grift (born 1935), Dutch speed skater
- William Webster Van de Grift, birth name of Billy B. Van (1870–1950), American entertainer

== See also ==
- "Grift of the Magi", an episode of the American animated television series The Simpsons
- Grifter
