= E. Irene Rood =

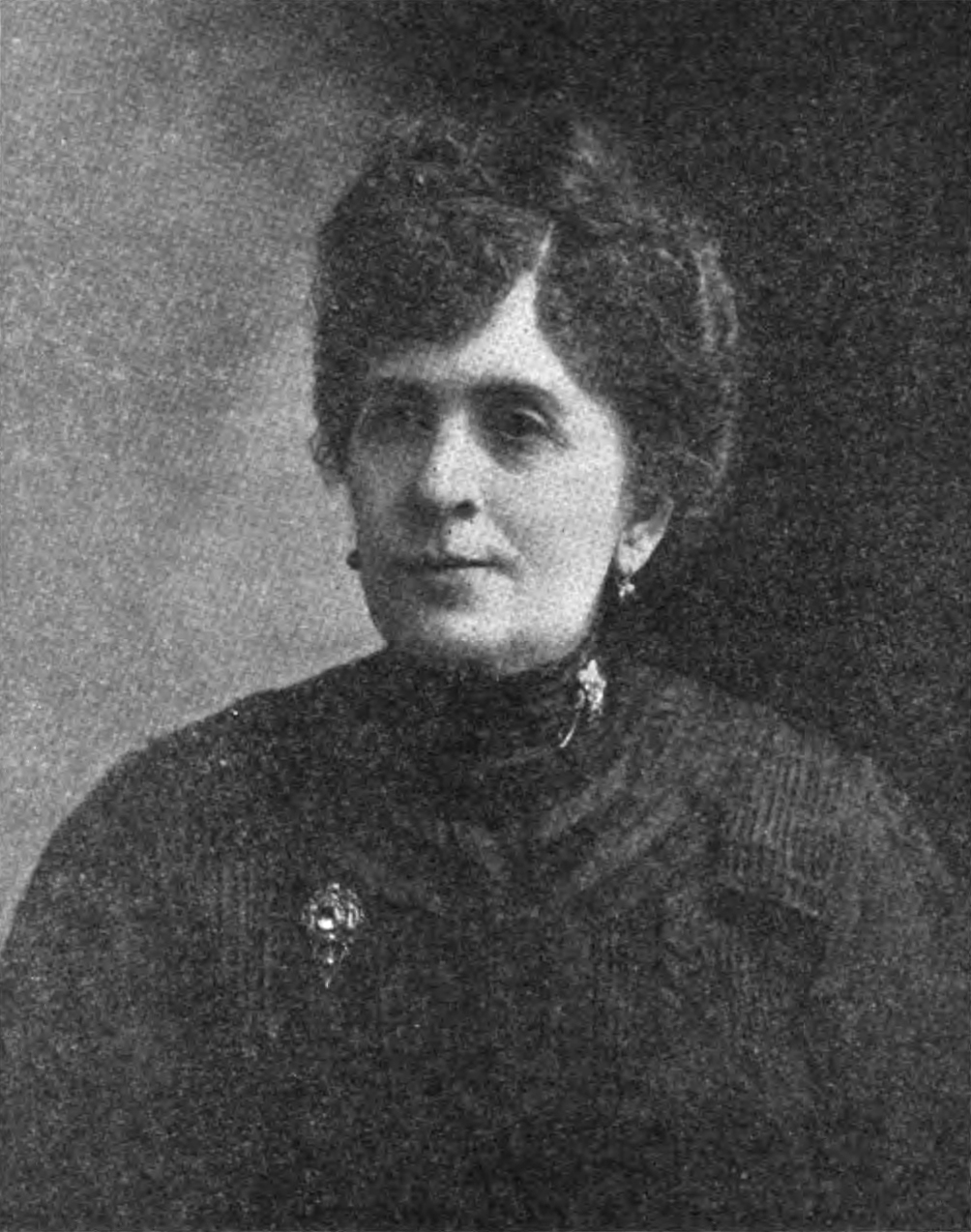
Ella Irene Rood

E. Irene Rood (1843–1921) was an American humanitarian and organizational leader. She organized the "Audubon Society" in Chicago, Illinois which was said to be the only society of its kind then in existence.

== Early life ==
Ella Irene Rood was born in 1843.

== Career ==
In 1890, a Chicago Society was started under the presidency of E. Irene Rood. About 70 persons joined and the Society was incorporated in 1893. It was said to be the only society of its kind then in existence. She said: "The late Rev. Jenkin Lloyd Jones (a lover of birds) gave me the free use of his church in which to hold the preliminary meetings, and at my request signed the incorporation papers."

As founder and first President of the "Audubon Society," Rood worked indefatigably to make that society a success. She was made Chair of the Ornithological Congress at the 1893 World's Columbian Exposition in Chicago, also a member of that distinguished body of scientists: "The American Ornithological Union, for the Protection of North American Birds." After this congress, Rood's work took her away from Chicago.

She began to distribute leaflets and to give talks on humane subjects in schools and Sunday schools. The Chicago Eye, November 20, 1897, published an interesting article about the work she was doing. She investigated complaints of cruelty, corresponded with the legislature, wrote articles for newspapers and magazines, made addresses and formed Bands of Mercy and Audubon Societies, in many states.

In 1896, she organized the Fort Worth Humane Society in Fort Worth, Texas. In 1897 she presented the Rood Humane Education Bill to the legislature of that state. This bill did not pass at the first session but in the face of many obstacles, passed after she introduced it the second time.

In 1898–99, Rood founded the Austin Humane Society, which is still doing good work. This time also covers her work of organizing the State Humane Society in Texas, of which she was secretary for a time. Soon after this she organized the Dallas Humane Society, a thriving society which did excellent work.

=== 20th-century ===
In 1900–01, Rood secured the passage of the "Rood Humane Education Bill" in Colorado, making humane education compulsory in the public schools of the state. She organized the Colorado Humane Society and was elected its Honorary President. This society had a large and influential membership and was very successful. Mr. Edwin K. Whitehead of Denver, Colorado, prepared a textbook for use in the schools, and this book has been used in many places, and has been very helpful to those interested in humane education. In 1901, Rood succeeded in having a commissioned humane officer appointed in Beulah, Colorado; also a humane Conference Committee to advise with him in all important matters. She established a Loan Library in Denver in 1901, and assisted in the distribution of humane literature. This same year she introduced the "Rood Humane Education Bill" in the Wyoming legislature, and with the assistance of the most influential persons there, was successful in getting the bill passed. She also organized the Pueblo Humane Education Society.

In 1902, in response to an urgent appeal to the American Humane Association, Rood was sent to Montana to establish humane work there on a firmer basis. A society was organized at Billings. Later, societies were organized in all the large towns in Montana. A State Humane Society was organized, and in the winter of 1903 Rood also worked for the passage of a bill to create a "State Bureau for the Protection of Children and Animals," and was successful. An appropriation was also made for the maintenance of this Bureau. The success of this legislature work was the result of Mrs. Rood's persistent conscientious efforts. Mrs. Rood said: "In speaking of Nebraska I cannot express my gratitude for the faithful, efficient help given by Mr. Alfred Millard of Omaha, and Mrs. Mary Smith Hayward of Chadron, Nebraska.

In response to an urgent appeal from Lincoln, Nebraska, Rood went there and introduced three bills, all of which were passed in that legislature-one to prevent "docking horses tails" one to prevent "poultry being plucked while yet alive," and a third to prohibit "the shooting of live birds from traps."

During the time Rood was doing legislative work, she distributed humane literature and in every way possible tried to arouse public sentiment.

In Texas, societies were formed in Austin, Dallas, Fort Worth, Houston, Taylor, and other cities. Among other people both Mr. and Mrs. John E. Oldright, of Austin, Texas, manifested a deep interest in the cause.

In 1903, through the efforts of Rood, a Humane Education law was passed in Pennsylvania. This year, she also organized a Humane Society in Jackson, Michigan, arousing considerable interest and enthusiasm. She organized the Council Bluffs Humane Society at meetings held at the Charity Organization and at the YMCA.

After organizing a Humane Education Society at Port Huron, Michigan, Rood influenced the Board of Education to institute the teaching in the public schools of that city.

In 1908, the "Humane Education Society" at Fort Dodge was organized. It was during this year after her return from the south that Rood learned of the purchase by John D. Rockefeller, of a farm in New Jersey upon which animals were to be raised and used for experimental purposes by vivisectors. She started there at once, and after a great deal of trouble, succeeded in reaching the editor of the New York Herald. She placed this matter before him, explaining the attitude of humane people on the subject of vivisection, and he became interested. The consequence was that the New York Herald took this matter up, aroused great interest in the subject, and opened the eyes of many people to the cruelty and danger of vivisection. Frank Parker Stockbridge, of the New York Herald, did much to encourage and help Rood in this connection.

In 1909, while Rood was working in Colorado, Mr. E. K. Whitehead, one of the most efficient leaders in the work in the United States, gave invaluable assistance. He said: "Mrs. Rood did a great thing when she had the Humane Education law passed. The State Superintendent of Public Instruction is pushing the observance of it and everybody will soon be approving of it." To Rood personally he said, "You are laying the foundation on which a fair and great superstructure will some day rise," and he added that her work was the immediate cause of his preparing a textbook on the “care and treatment of animals."

The same year (1909), Rood organized societies at Oskaloosa, Marshaltown, Waterloo, Muscatine, Keokuk, Fort Madison and other places in Iowa; revived the society at Redwing, Minnesota, where she went to stimulate and encourage interest, organized the Shakopee, Minnesota society, and re-organized the Joliet Humane Society at Joliet, Illinois. At Keokuk, newspaper accounts showed a wonderful meeting where prominent theologians and speakers took the stand for prevention of cruelty and praised Rood's methods of organizing. Good work was done in Wyoming, superintendents and teachers in the schools being interested to continue the work Reed had started.

She finally had the satisfaction of seeing it so popular that foreign countries took up the work in earnest and societies were organized in London and Paris and in many other large cities.

== Death ==
E. Irene Rood died in Chicago, on May 21, 1921. She was preceded in death by her husband, Frank H. Rood.
