= Shyster =

Person who acts in a disreputable manner

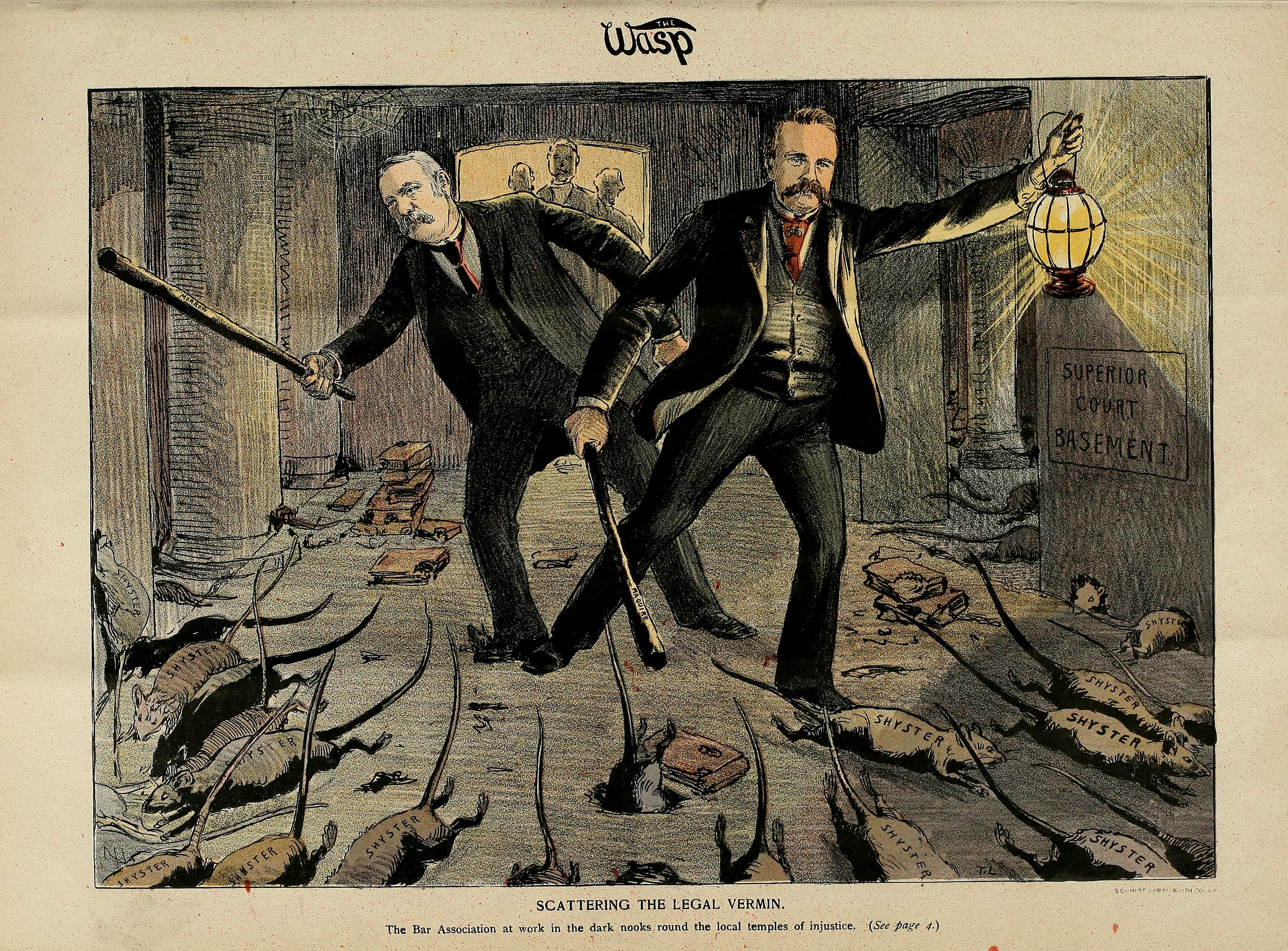
"Scattering The Legal Vermin", a political cartoon published in The Wasp depicting the efforts of Judge William W. Morrow and Congressman James G. Maguire to rid the San Francisco Superior Court of "shysters"; February 11, 1893

Shyster (/ˈʃaɪstər/; also spelled schiester, scheister, etc.) is a slang word for someone who acts in a disreputable, unethical, or unscrupulous way, especially in the practice of law, sometimes also politics or finance.

== Etymology ==
The etymology of the word is not generally agreed upon. The Oxford English Dictionary describes it as "of obscure origin", possibly deriving from a historical sense of "shy" meaning disreputable.

The Merriam-Webster Dictionary deemed it probably based on the German Scheißer (literally "shitter", i.e. "defecator"). A book published in 2013 traces the first use back to 1843, when scammers in New York City would exploit prisoners by pretending to be lawyers. These scammers were disparagingly referred to as "shisers", meaning "worthless people" in British slang, which in turn was originally derived from the German "Scheißer".

Various etymologies have suggested an antisemitic origin, possibly associated with the character of Shylock from Shakespeare's The Merchant of Venice, but there is no clear evidence for this. One source asserts that the term originated in Philadelphia in 1843 from a disreputable attorney named "Schuster."

The United Kingdom's Advertising Standards Authority (ASA) ruled that while "some viewers may find the term distasteful," a television advertisement that used the term in a derogatory context did not "cause serious or widespread offence" according to the CAP Code. When contacted by the ASA, the Board of Deputies of British Jews stated that they did not have concerns with the advertisement's content.

== Cultural references ==
- U.S. professional wrestler Mike Rotunda, using the ring name Irwin R. Schyster (abbreviated to "I.R.S.") portrayed a dishonest tax collector and accountant.
- Sylvester Shyster, a Walt Disney cartoon character introduced in 1930, is a disbarred attorney who schemes to deprive Minnie Mouse of her inheritance; and in many comic serials by Floyd Gottfredson (his creator) he appeared scheming with Peg Leg Pete
- The 1932/33 radio show Flywheel, Shyster, and Flywheel, starring Groucho and Chico Marx, depicts the misadventures of a small law firm.
- In The Wire episode Backwash, Maui pranks his fellow stevedore Ziggy, pretending to be a law firm informing him that a woman he's had sexual relations with is now pregnant. When Ziggy's cousin Nick calls back, the phone number leads to Maui's cell phone, which he answers with "Shyster, Shyster & Shyster."
- In The Simpsons, Lionel Hutz is a shady lawyer who is repeatedly hired by the titular family. In his first appearance in "Bart Gets Hit by a Car", Lisa refers to him as a "shyster".
- The film Big Stan featured Lew Popper who is a shyster lawyer that Stan Minton replaces his lawyer Mal with in an attempt to bribe Judge Perry. Lew does that where Stan is allowed 3 years in Verlaine State Correctional Facility while spending 6 months before incarceration to reorganize his "charity". By the end of the film, Lew was arrested and incarcerated at Verlaine State Correctional Facility for having slept with a foreperson of a trial he was recently involved in.
- Saul Goodman (aka Jimmy McGill) is a criminal lawyer featured in Breaking Bad and is the eponymous main character of its prequel, Better Call Saul. In both shows, Saul is shown to be flagrant in his violations of the law and indifferent about scheming and committing crimes to get a better outcome for his defendants in court. Because of his disregard of the law, his fellow lawyers have called him a shyster, most notably Howard Hamlin. He becomes affiliated with the chemistry teacher-turned-drug lord, Walter White, and serves as his advisor and confidant in his highly illegal activities.
- 'The Lawyer' is a nameless recurring character in It's Always Sunny in Philadelphia who is often pitted against 'the Gang' and their friends in their numerous legal exploits. He is often described as a shyster and a 'Jew Lawyer', especially by Frank.
- American rapper Pooh Shiesty derived his stage name from 'shyster'. The term 'shiesty' has grown in popularity as a slang term for balaclavas, which have also trended as a streetwear fashion item, due to the rapper sporting them.

== See also ==
- Hustler
- Pseudolaw
