= Alta Partners =

American venture capital firm

- Type: Private ownership
- Industry: Private equity
- Predecessor: Burr, Egan, Deleage & Co.
- Founded: 1996
- Founder: Jean Deleage; Garrett Gruener; Marino Polestra; Guy Paul Nohra
- Headquarters: One Embarcadero Center; San Francisco, California, United States
- Key people: Daniel S. (Dan) Janney, managing partner; Peter (Pete) Hudson, managing partner; Robert J. (Bob) More, managing partner
- Products: Venture capital
- Website: www.altapartners.com

Alta Partners is a venture capital firm based in San Francisco which invests primarily in biotechnology and life science companies.

Cofounder Guy Nohra later relocated in Barcelona, Spain, to cofound Alta Life Sciences in 2016.

== History ==
Dan Janney joined Alta as a partner in 1996, when the firm was founded; Pete Hudson and Bob More joined in 2017.

In 2000, the firm launched two venture capital funds, Alta California Partners III and Alta BioPharma Partners II. It raised its ninth fund, Alta Partners NextGen Fund I, in 2017. Two new healthcare VC funds were launched in 2004: Alta BioPharma Partners III and ACP IV.

In May 2022, the company filed a lawsuit against BRC Inc. (NYSE:BRCC), the surviving entity of a 2021 merger between SilverBox Capital and Black Rifle Coffee) in the Southern District of New York, which alleging a breach of contract, and seeking damages due to BRC's refusal to allow Alta to exercise warrants in 2022. The suit was settled in June 2025, with Alta paying BRC $1,000,000, and BRC issuing 2,300,100 shares of its Class A common stock to Alta.

== Investments ==
Alta Partners has invested in companies such as Ellie Mae, Be Inc., Ilex Oncology, Connects Corp, The Medicines Co., Kite Pharmaceuticals, ZS Pharma, Esperion, Allakos Chemgenx, DeCode Calistoga, Aerie, Cymabay, Tyra Biosciences, DIspatchHealth and VIR Biotechnology.

== See also ==
- Burr, Egan, Deleage & Co.
- Alta Communications
