= NatureShare =

Nature website

NatureShare from The National Audubon Society
- Company type: website from environmental non-profit
- Industry: environmental non-profit
- Founded: March 2009
- Headquarters: New York, NY, US
- Key people: David Yarnold, CEO
- Products: see article
- Website: Official website

NatureShare is a community website for people who love the outdoors. Registered members can collect and post their wildlife sightings and share them with other nature enthusiasts. Originally created by NatureShare/Green Mountain Digital, the NatureShare website has been owned and operated by the National Audubon Society since May 2015. The majority of NatureShare users post to and access the site via one of the National Audubon Society's Audubon Guides ‘Birds’ mobile apps, available for free for iOS, Android, and Kindle Fire.

== History timeline ==
- March 2009 – Green Mountain Digital is founded
- October 2009 – First four "Audubon Guide" apps are released for iOS: Birds, Trees, Wildflowers, and Mammals
- 2010 – Subsequent "Audubon Guide" apps and Android platform apps released
- July 2012 – Green Mountain Digital becomes NatureShare, raises $1.5M in funding, downloads pass 750,000
- May 2015 – Deal completed for acquisition of all Audubon-branded apps and the NatureShare website by the National Audubon Society
- March 2016 – National Audubon Society launches re-branded and enhanced NatureShare.com.
