= William P. Egan =

American venture capitalist

- Education: Fairfield University; The Wharton School of the University of Pennsylvania
- Occupation: Venture capitalist
- Employer(s): Alta Communications; Marion Equity Partners

William P. Egan was an American venture capitalist. He was the founder and general partner at Alta Communications, a venture capital firm, and Marion Equity Partners, a private equity firm, both based in Boston, Massachusetts. Egan also founded Alta's predecessor firm, Burr, Egan, Deleage & Co. (BEDCO) in 1979 and has identified and backed several of America's leading growth companies in the information technology, life sciences, and communications industries. Egan is also a limited partner, along with fellow BEDCO founder Craig Burr, at Nobska Partners, also in Boston.

== Early life and education ==
Egan received his B.A. from Fairfield University in 1967 where he was a member of the Fairfield University Men's Rugby Football Club. He then received an MBA from The Wharton School of the University of Pennsylvania in 1969.

== Career ==
Egan was previously a partner at TA Associates. He began his career as a manager of Venture Capital for New England Enterprise Capital Corporation. Egan is past president and chairman of the National Venture Capital Association and serves on several boards of directors of communications, cable, and information technology companies, as well as the biopharmaceutical company Cephalon.

Egan was a long-standing member of the Fairfield University board of trustees and was honored for his contributions to the university with an Alumni Service Award in 1995. The Egan Chapel of St. Ignatius Loyola is named in honor of Egan's parents, John and Marion Egan. Egan's gifts to the university is the largest donation received by Fairfield to date. The nursing school at Fairfield University was renamed due to this donation. Egan was a trustee of University of Pennsylvania and a graduate board member of The Wharton School.

His success in the venture capital industry has a chapter dedicated to his story in the book Done Deals: Venture Capitalists Tell Their Stories. (pp. 269–278, by Udayan Gupta, Harvard Business School Press, ISBN 978-0-87584-938-6)

Egan was an owner of the Boston Celtics through his partnership with Boston Basketball Partners LLC.

Eganis was the board for The Wharton Center for Leadership and Change Management.

== Personal life ==
He and his wife Jacayln Egan (formerly Jacalyn Conklin) have donated large sums to Fairfield University and divide their time between Boston, Massachusetts, and Newport, Rhode Island. Egan and his wife were part-owners of the Boston Celtics of the National Basketball Association through his partnership with Boston Basketball Partners, LLC. Egan passed away peacefully surrounded by his family on September 13, 2025. He was 80 years old.
