= Jon Flint =

- Born: Jonathan Andrew Flint; August 11, 1951 (age 75); New York City, New York, USA
- Education: Hobart College; University of Virginia School of Law
- Occupations: Co-Founder and Managing Partner, Polaris Partners; Co-Founder and Chairman, Living Proof
- Spouse: Alice Parker Flint
- Children: 4

Jonathan A. Flint is a venture capitalist and entrepreneur who co-founded venture capital firms Polaris Partners and Polaris Founders Capital, as well as the companies Living Proof and Icelandic Provisions.

== Early career ==
Flint graduated with a BA from Hobart College and a JD from the University of Virginia School of Law. In 1971, Flint was the assistant director and an actor in John Landis' first film Schlock. From 1974 to 1976, Flint was on the research team of the Impeachment Inquiry Staff of the House Judiciary Committee and then served as a researcher under Richard Ben-Veniste on the Watergate Special Prosecution Force. Flint later worked as a litigator with Testa, Hurwitz & Thibeault, a venture capital law firm based in Boston. In 1984, he changed careers and became a venture capitalist at Burr, Egan, Deleage & Co. (BEDCO). Flint later became a partner of BEDCO and was instrumental in a series of successful software startups, including a $105 million payback on a $3 million investment in Powersoft Corporation.

== Polaris Partners and Polaris Founders Capital ==
Along with Terry McGuire and Steve Arnold, Flint left BEDCO in 1996 and founded the venture capital firm Polaris Partners. Polaris is now investing out of its ninth venture fund and has also raised a life sciences Innovation Fund and two Growth Funds. In 2015, Flint and McGuire formed an affiliated fund, Polaris Founders Capital ("PFC"), to invest primarily in consumer companies. PFC investments include Icelandic Provisions, Caledonia Spirits, EXOS, Frequency Therapeutics, Tropic Biosciences, Geosure Global, and Sir Kensington. Flint is currently the co-chairman of Icelandic Provisions and on the Board of Caledonia Spirits.

== Living Proof ==
In 2005, Flint and Dr. Robert Langer co-founded Living Proof to apply advanced polymer technologies that had not been used before in the beauty industry to "bring women proof in a bottle rather than hope in a bottle." Polaris seed funded Living Proof with $1 million in initial funding. The company started by hiring five scientists who had never worked in the beauty industry and who had never worked in cancer research and other medical areas. The scientists' first invention was a polymer called OFPMA that is used on frizzy hair, and they have since been awarded over 15 patents for several beauty products. Flint served as Chairman of Living Proof until the company was sold to Unilever in 2016, and he served as CEO from 2010 until the end of 2011. While CEO, he initiated discussions with Jennifer Aniston and, in 2012, Aniston became a co-owner and spokesperson for the company.

== Icelandic Provisions ==
In 2013, Flint and McGuire partnered with MS Iceland Dairies, Iceland's largest dairy, a farmer-owned co-op, to bring skyr to US consumers. Flint initially served as the CEO and, subsequently recruited the current CEO, Mark Alexander, the former President Americas of the Campbell Soup Company. Flint is co-chairman of Living Proof alongside Ari Edwald, the CEO of MS Dairies.
