= Vladimir E. Flint =

Russian conservationist and zoologist

Vladimir Evgenievich Flint (Владимир Евгеньевич Флинт; March 14, 1924 – March 23, 2004) was a Russian conservationist and zoologist, specializing in ornithology. He was the author or co-author of more than 650 papers and books dealing with zoology and wildlife conservation.

== Biography ==
Vladimir E. Flint was born in Moscow and grew up in the neighborhood of Bolshaya Ordynka Street. From childhood, he took a serious interest in birds. His father, E. E. Flint (1887–1975), was a professor of crystallography. In WW II Vladimir Flint served in combat as a crew member of a T-34 and became shell-shocked, but returned to the front. He ended the war on the Elbe with the rank of senior lieutenant, acting as second in command to the officer commanding a machine gun platoon.

After military service from 1942 to the spring of 1946, Flint worked in Moscow for two years and took academic classes in the evenings. In 1948 he entered the Biological Faculty of Moscow State University (MSU). In 1953 Vladimir graduated from MSU University with a diploma thesis on the eider of the White Sea's Onega Bay. After graduation, he entered a postgraduate course in the Gamaleya Research Institute of Epidemiology and Microbiology. There he did research on rodents and spatial clusters of rodent-borne epidemics. In 1959 he defended his candidate's dissertation "On the zoological foundatoins of epidemiological exploration". From 1969 to 1976 he was a senior research fellow at the Zoological Museum of Moscow State University. In 1972 he defended his Russian doctoral dissertation on "The spatial structure of populations of small mammals". In 1976 he became the head of the department of wildlife protection at the All-Russian Research Institute for Nature Conservation of the State Committee on Ecology of Russia (formerly the Central Laboratory for Nature Conservation of the USSR Ministry of Agriculture). He worked at the institute for the remainder of his career.

V. E. Flint published not only scientific monographs and articles, field guides, and textbooks for universities, but also many popular science essays and children's books. He was a frequent guest on the popular Russian television show «В мире животных» (In the World of Animals).

He died in Moscow on March 23, 2004. The urn with his ashes is in a family grave in section 4 of the Donskoye Cemetery.

== Contributions to nature conservation ==
V. E. Flint was among the founders of the USSR Ornithological Society in 1983. He was the leader for the creation in 1993 of the Союз охраны птиц России (abbreviated СОПР; Russian Bird Conservation Union). He was the union's president for almost 10 years and then became honorary president.

Flint focused on the conservation and restoration of rare species of birds and mammals. He was a leader in the development of captive breeding centers for saving genetic resources and for the reintroduction and population restoration of threatened wildlife. Some on the animals benefitting from his work were cranes, raptors, great bustards, and Mongolian gazelles.

In 1973 he became the first Russian scientist to make contact with the International Crane Foundation. He was the leader of the international "Project Sterkh", involving ornithologists who exported and imported hatching eggs of the Siberian crane.

Vladimir Flint participated in the creation of the IUCN's Red Data Books and in the preparation of legislative acts on nature conservation. He was one of the authors and editors of the Red Data Book of the USSR (1978, 1982), the Red Data Book of the RSFSR (1983), the Red Data Book of the Russian Federation (2001) and the Red Data Book of Moscow (2001). He is the author of the draft of the USSR law «Об охране и использовании животного мира» ("On the Protection and Use of Wildlife"), which declared fundamentally new legal norms. The law was approved and put into effect by a decree of the Supreme Soviet of the USSR on January 1, 1981. He also promoted international cooperation for wildlife conservation by facilitating visits by people like Gerald Durrell and Sir Peter Scott to remote areas of Russia.

Flint was elected as a representative of the USSR to the Council and Bureau of the IUCN, became vice-chairman of the IUCN Rare Species Commission, a member of the International Ornithological Committee and its Executive Committee, a member of the Scientific Council of the International Crane Conservation Fund, and national coordinator of Russia's cooperation with the International Bureau for the Study and Conservation of Wetlands.

== Expeditions ==
V. E. Flint visited more than 50 foreign countries. As a member of the board of the Ассоциации дружбы с народами Африки (Association of Friendship with the Peoples of Africa), V. E. Flint organized a number of trips to the national parks of Kenya, Uganda, and Tanzania. Together with such scientists as Andrei Grigorievich Bannikov, Yuri Andreevich Isakov, Viktor Alekseevich Popov (1910–1980), and others, he was among the first Soviet zoologists to see with their own eyes the animal world of the savannahs of East Africa.

Flint worked in expeditions in Northern Kazakhstan, Primorsky Krai, Tuva, Transbaikalia, Turkmenistan and other republics of Central Asia. Since 1963, his attention was drawn to the north — he visited the Barents Sea's Murmansk coast, Wrangel Island, the tundra of Yakutia, and the Taimyr Peninsula. In all his expeditions, he took every opportunity to study birds.

== Family ==
V. E. Flint was married to Tatyana Lvovna Zenkevich (Muromtseva), a marine biologist and a daughter of Lev Aleksandrovich Zenkevich, an oceanographer. Their older son Mikhail Vladimirovich (born 1949), was a corresponding member of the Russian Academy of Sciences, head of the Laboratory of Ecology and Distribution of Plankton, and deputy director of the P. P. Shirshov Institute of Oceanology of the Russian Academy of Sciences (Moscow). The younger son Alexander (born 1953) was director of the St. Demetrius School of Sisters of Mercy (Moscow) from 1992 to 2003 and, subsequently, became general director of «Информационно-образовательный центр „Соучастие“», a non-profit organization for promoting information, education, and charitable participation, for the Russian Orthodox Church.

== Awards and honors ==
Flint was elected a full member (academician) of the Russian Academy of Sciences. He was elected to honorary memberships in the British Ornithologists' Union (1985), the National Geographic Society (1989), and the British Trust for Ornithology (1992).

Flint was awarded the Order of the Patriotic War 1st class. He was appointed Honored Ecologist of the Russian Federation. He was awarded in 1981 the Order of Friendship of Peoples and in 1985 Holland's Order of the Golden Ark. In 1987 he received both the Audubon#Audubon Medal of the National Audubon Society and the UNEP International Award "Global-500".

== Selected publications ==
=== Articles ===
- Kistchinski, A. A.; Flint, V. E. (1974). "On the biology of the spectacled eider". Wildfowl Journal. 25 (25): 5–15.
- Flint, V. E.; Galushin, V. M. (1981). "Strategy of raptor conservation in the USSR". Raptor Research. 15 (1, Article 1). (January 2024 online reprint of 1981 article)
- Flint, V. E. (1998). "Waders as indicators of biological diversity". International Wader Studies. 10: 23. abstract only
- Pereladova, O. B.; Sempéeré, A. J.; Soldatova, N. V.; Dutov, V. U.; Fisenko, G.; Flint, V. E. (1999). "Przewalski's horse—adaptation to semi-wild life in desert conditions". Oryx. 33: 47–58. doi:10.1046/j.1365-3008.1999.00038.x.

=== Books ===
- Флинт В. Е., Чугунов Юрий Дмитриевич, Спирин Владимир Моисеевич (1965). Млекопитающие СССР (Mammals of the USSR) (15,000 copies 1st ed.). Moscow: ГеографгизФормозов Александр Николаевич (general editor); 2nd edition: published in Moscow by Мысль (Mysl), 1970, 50,000 copies
- Флинт В. Е., Буме Рюрик Львович, Костин Юлий Витальевич, Кузнецов Александр Александрович (1968). Птицы СССР (Birds of the USSR). Справочники-определители географа и путешественника (Geographer's and Traveler's Handbooks) (50000 copies 1st ed.). Мoscow: Мысль.
  - A Field guide to birds of the USSR: including Eastern Europe and Central Asia. Princeton, N.J.: Princeton University Press. 1984. LCCN 83042558; by V.E. Flint, et al.; translated from the Russian «Птицы СССР» by Natalia Bourso-Leland; ornithological advisor, James Baird; xxxi+353 p., 48 p. of plates: illustrated (some in color); maps; 1989 pbk edition. ISBN 0691082448.
- Флинт В. Е. (1977). Пространственная структура популяций мелких млекопитающих (Spatial structure of small mammal populations). Мoscow: НаукаАН СССР, Моск. о-во испытателей природы (USSR Academy of Sciences, Moscow Society of Naturalists)
- Флинт В. Е. (1978). Птицы наших лугов и полей (Birds of our meadows and fields) (300000 copies 1st ed.). Мoscow: Детская литература (Children's literature.
- Флинт В. Е. (1981). Операция «Стерх» (Operation "Sterkh") (20000 copies 1st ed.). Мoscow: Лесная промышленность (Forest Industry).
- Флинт В. Е. (1981). Птицы в нашем лесу (Birds in our forest) (450000 copies 1st ed.). Мoscow: Детская литература (Children's literature); Фотографы (photographers): Б. К. Машков & А. В. Гражданкин
- Банников Андрей Григорьевич, Флинт В. Е. (1982). Мы должны их спасти (We Must Save Them) (90000 copies 1st ed.). Мoscow: Мысль.
- Флинт В. Е., Черкасова Мария Валентиновна (1985). Редкие и исчезающие животные (Rare and Endangered Animals). Библиотечка Детской энциклопедии «Учёные — школьнику» (Library of the Children's Encyclopedia "Scientists - to the Schoolchild") (200000 copies 1st ed.). Мoscow: Педагогика.
- Флинт В. Е., Бёме, Рюрик Львович (1994). Пятиязычный словарь названий животных: Птицы. (Five-language dictionary of animal names: Birds): Латинский, русский, английский, немецкий, французский (Latin, Russian, English, German, French): 11060 назв (11060 entries) ). Мoscow: Руссо; Русский язык (Russian language); under of the general editorship of В. Е. Соколова
- Флинт В. Е., Сорокин А. К. (1999). Сокол на перчатке (Falcon on the Glove) (3000 copies 1st ed.). Мoscow: Эгмонт. ISBN 5-85044-308-8.
- Флинт В. Е. (2000). Стратегия сохранения редких видов в России: теория и практика (Strategy for the Conservation of Rare Species in Russia: Theory and Practice). Мoscow: ГЕОС.
  - Флинт В. Е. (2004). Стратегия сохранения редких видов в России: теория и практика (Strategy for the Conservation of Rare Species in Russia: Theory and Practice) (2000 copies 2nd ed.). Мoscow. ISBN 5-89118-171-1; Московский зоопарк (Moscow Zoo)
- Флинт В. Е. (2002). 100 удивительных животных (Энциклопедии для детей) (100 Amazing Animals (Children's Encyclopedias)) (10000 copies 1st ed.). Мoscow: Эгмонт. ISBN 5-85044-868-3.
