= Flint, West Virginia =

Unincorporated community in West Virginia, United States

Flint
- Unincorporated community
- Location within the state of West Virginia Flint (the United States)
- Coordinates: 38°51′13″N 79°43′48″W
- Country: United States
- State: West Virginia
- County: Randolph
- Elevation: 2,415 ft (736 m)
- Time zone: UTC-5 (Eastern (EST))
  - Summer (DST): UTC-4 (EDT)
- GNIS ID: 1551144

Flint is an unincorporated community in Randolph County, West Virginia, United States.
