= James Flint =

James Flint may refer to:

- James Flint (merchant) (1720–?), British merchant and diplomat
- James Flint (1733–1810), Scottish surgeon, co-founder of the Royal Society of Edinburgh
- James Flint (architect) (1862–1894), Australian architect
- James Flint (RAF officer) (1913–2013), British businessman and officer
- Bruiser Flint (born 1965), American basketball coach
- James Flint (novelist) (born 1968), British novelist
- Captain Flint, a fictional character, created by Robert Louis Stevenson
- Captain James Flint, a fictional character in the Swallows and Amazons series of books
