= Garrett Gruener =

American politician

- Education: University of California San Diego; University of California Berkeley
- Occupation: Venture Capitalist
- Known for: Founder of Ask.com
- Political party: Democratic party

Garrett Gruener is an American venture capitalist, most known as the founder of Ask.com and a co-founder of Alta Partners. He was also a candidate for the 2003 California recall special election from the Democratic Party, finishing 28th in a field of 135 candidates with 2,562 votes.

== Education ==
Gruener received his B.S. at the University of California San Diego in 1976, and he received his M.A. at the University of California Berkeley.

== Career ==
=== Business ===
Gruener has been working for more than two decades in the fields of software development, systems engineering, and corporate development. In 1982, he founded Virtual Microsystems, a communications software company that was later merged with a larger corporation. Garrett specializes in information technology and is on the board of directors of nCircle Network Security, Xelerated, and Nanomix. In 1992, he became a Partner at Burr, Egan, Deleage & Co. In 1996, along with Jean Deleage, Guy Nohra and Marino Polestral, he co-founded Alta Partners, a venture capital firm in life sciences. As of 2018, he is still serving as the company's Managing Director. He is also on the Board of Directors of Goldman School of Public Policy, part of the University of California, Berkeley.

==== Ask.com ====
In 1995, Gruener alongside David Warthen, a consulting engineer, created a company called Ask Jeeves. After both investing over $250,000 they set up their office in Berkeley, California. Named after the butler in the stories by P.G. Wodehouse "who had an answer to every problem", the firm provides software that operates in a "question-and-answer" format. In 1997, they made their product available for free on the Internet under the name Ask.com. The product utilizes syntactic and semantic analysis to answer the asked question through one of the around 10,000 basic formulas. It shows various versions of the question and allows the user to pick the desired one. In the beginning, the company employed around 40 workers who provided the users with the needed answer to their question. In 1998, the company made around $1 million profit for adverts on its website. In 2003, Gruener stepped out of the chairman position at Ask.com.

==== Virtual Microsystems ====
Virtual Microsystems Inc (VMI) software enabled running MS-DOS and CP/M application programs on Digital Equipment Corporation's VAX minicomputers. As of mid-1988, VMI and Logicraft were "the only commercially available products that let VAX/VMS systems run standard off-the-shelf PC applications from terminals and VAXstations." VMI's "The Bridge" facilitated using the DEC machine's hard disk, which in turn provided better backups than individualized floppy-based arrangements. The Bridge is slower than a top end PC; VMI's Z-Board add-on matches that speed.

Other benefits included developing software for PCs and printing on DEC-attached high speed printers.

=== Politics ===
Gruener was a candidate for the 2003 California gubernatorial recall election from the Democratic Party. He was one of the candidates who aggressively used the Internet to push his message and also ran campaign ads in selected television markets. Eventually, Gruener finished 28th in a field of 135 candidates with 2,562 votes.

== Personal life ==
Gruener is married to Amy Slater, an attorney and lecturer on the subject of negotiations and conflict resolution at the Goldman School of Public Policy and at the University of California, Hastings College of the Law. They live in the Bay Area. Gruener is also a pilot.
