= National reserve =

Protected areas in the United States

In the United States, a national reserve is a protected area administered by the National Park Service. While it is a protected area similar to a national park, the rules for use are usually more relaxed and varied.

Currently, there are 4 national reserves:

- City of Rocks National Reserve (Idaho). Known for granite spires, California Trail landmarks, and rock climbing areas.
- Ebey's Landing National Historical Reserve (Washington). Area comprising coastal cliffs, meadows, and farmland.
- Ice Age National Scientific Reserve (Wisconsin). Preserves landforms created during the last Ice age, and part of the Ice Age Trail.
- Pinelands National Reserve (New Jersey). Protects the Pine Barrens ecosystem in New Jersey.
