= Flint (given name) =

Flint is a masculine given name. It may refer to:

- Flint Dille (born 1955), American screenwriter, game designer and novelist
- Flint Fleming (born 1965), American former Arena Football League player
- Flint Hanner (1898–1973), American multi-sport track and field athlete and coach
- Flint Gregory Hunt (1959–1997), American murderer
- Flint Rasmussen (born 1968), American rodeo clown
- Flint Rhem (1901–1969), American Major League Baseball pitcher

== Fictional Characters ==
- Flint Lockwood, the main protagonist of Cloudy with a Chance of Meatballs, Cloudy with a Chance of Meatballs 2, and Cloudy with a Chance of Meatballs: The Series
