= Robert Flynn (disambiguation) =

Robert Flynn may refer to:

- Robb Flynn (born 1968), American guitarist
- Robert J. Flynn (1937–2014), United States Navy naval flight officer
- Robert Flynn (author) (born 1932), American novelist from Texas
- Robbie Flynn, fictional character on Hollyoaks
- Bobby Flynn (born 1981), Australian musician
