= Terry McGuire =

American venture capitalist

Terrance Gerard McGuire, commonly known as Terry McGuire, is an American venture capitalist, best known as a founding partner of Polaris Partners, a venture capital firm.

== Early life and education ==
McGuire was born and raised in Lancaster, New York. He attended Lancaster High School and then Hobart College, where he earned a Bachelor of Science degree in physics and economics. Following his undergraduate studies, he was awarded a Thomas J. Watson Fellowship in 1979, which enabled him to study the Irish language and cultural traditions in Ireland. He later pursued advanced degrees, earning a Master of Science in engineering from the Thayer School of Engineering at Dartmouth College, followed by an MBA from Harvard Business School.

== Career ==
He began his career in venture capital at Golder, Thoma & Cressey in Chicago before moving to Burr, Egan, Deleage & Co., where he invested in early-stage technology companies. In 1996, he co-founded Polaris Partners, which has since managed approximately $4 billion in assets and invested in over 200 healthcare and technology companies globally.

Among others, he has co-founded Inspire Pharmaceuticals (later acquired by Merck), AIR (acquired by Alkermes), and MicroCHIPS (acquired by Dare Bioscience). His investments reaching a combined enterprise value of over $70 billion. He has experience in early-stage investments in life sciences, healthcare, and technology companies.

== Awards and recognition ==
He has been acknowledged for his contributions to venture capital and biotechnology on multiple occasions. He has been listed on Forbes' Midas 100 List of Top Tech Investors and named one of Scientific American's Worldview 100 visionaries reshaping biotechnology. He is also the recipient of prestigious awards such as the Massachusetts Society for Medical Research Award, the Albert Einstein Award for Outstanding Achievement in Life Sciences, the National Venture Capital Association Outstanding Service Award and Venture Vanguard Award, and the Irish America Healthcare & Life Sciences 50 Award. He has been granted honorary doctorates from Ohio Wesleyan University and Canisius College for his work in translational science. In addition, he was named "Most Loved VC" by The Funded.

== Leadership and public policy ==
He served as Chairman of the National Venture Capital Association (NVCA), during which time he testified before Congress regarding the Dodd-Frank Wall Street Reform and Consumer Protection Act.^{.} He also co-founded the Global Venture Capital Congress, a body that fosters cooperation among venture capital associations worldwide, and served as its chair from 2009 to 2024.

== Board memberships and advisory roles ==
His current and past board positions include roles at Alector, Adimab, Invivyd, Tectonic Therapeutics, and Seer, among others. He also serves on advisory boards for academic institutions, including the Arthur Rock Center for Entrepreneurship at Harvard Business School, MIT's David H. Koch Institute for Integrative Cancer Research, Whitehead Institute, Thayer School of Engineering (serving as chair from 2008 - 2021), and the Brigham Research Institute at Brigham and Women's Hospital.

== Personal life ==
He is married to Carolyn Carr McGuire, and they have three children.
