= John Flint (footballer) =

Australian rules footballer, born 1919

Personal information
- Full name: John Shaw Flint
- Born: 25 December 1919; Footscray, Victoria
- Died: 3 November 2007 (aged 87); Footscray, Victoria
- Original team: West Footscray
- Height: 174 cm (5 ft 9 in)
- Weight: 68 kg (150 lb)

Playing career^{1}
Years	Club	Games (Goals)
1939	Footscray	2 (0)
- ^{1} Playing statistics correct to the end of 1939.

John Shaw Flint (25 December 1919 – 3 November 2007) was an Australian rules footballer who played with Footscray in the Victorian Football League (VFL).

Flint served in the Australian Army during World War Two.
