= Flynt =

Flynt is both a surname and a given name. Notable people with the name include:

== Surname ==
- Althea Flynt (1953–1987), fourth wife of Larry Flynt, co-publisher the magazine Hustler
- Henry Flynt (born 1940), philosopher, avant-garde musician, anti-art activist and exhibited artist
- Jimmy Flynt (born 1948), of Larry Flynt Publications (LFP) produces adult videos and magazines, most notably Hustler
- John James Flynt, Jr. (1914–2007), United States Representative from Georgia.
- Josiah Flynt (1869–1907), American sociologist and author, born at Appleton, Wisc
- Larry Flynt (1942–2021), American publisher and the head of Larry Flynt Publications (LFP)
- Mike Flynt, linebacker for Division III Sul Ross State University in Alpine, Texas
- Wayne Flynt, Professor Emeritus in the Department of History at Auburn University

== Given name ==
- Flynt Leverett (born 1958), professor at the Pennsylvania State University School of International Affairs
- William Flynt Nichols (1918–1988), Democratic member of United States House of Representatives from Alabama

== See also ==
- Flint (disambiguation)
