= Flint, Kentucky =

Unincorporated community in Kentucky, United States

- Unincorporated community
- Location within the state of Kentucky Flint (the United States)
- Coordinates: 36°41′45″N 88°18′27″W
- Country: United States
- State: Kentucky
- County: Calloway
- Elevation: 522 ft (159 m)
- Time zone: UTC-6 (Central (CST))
  - Summer (DST): UTC-5 (CST)
- GNIS feature ID: 2743626

Flint was an unincorporated community in Calloway County, Kentucky, United States.
