= Hustle =

Hustle or The Hustle may refer to:

== Film ==
- Hustle (1975 film), an American crime film starring Burt Reynolds
- Hustle (2004 film), an American television film about Pete Rose
- Hustle (2008 film), a film starring Bai Ling
- The Hustle (2008 film), directed by Deon Taylor
- The Hustle (film), a 2019 American comedy film starring Anne Hathaway and Rebel Wilson
- Hustle (2021 film), a Nigerian film that revolves around a lady survival in the hustle and bustle of Lagos
- Hustle (2022 film), an American film starring Adam Sandler

== Music and dance ==
- Hustle (dance), 1975 disco dance craze popularized by the song of the same name
- "The Hustle" (song), a 1975 song by Van McCoy and the Soul City Symphony
- "Hustle" (Pink song), 2019
- Hustle (Rod Wave song), 2026
- The Hustle: A Brexit Disco Symphony, a 2019 album by Article 54
- "Hustle", a song by Jamelia from the album Walk with Me
- "Hustle on Up (Do the Bump)" a 1975 disco song by Hidden Strength

== Television ==
- Hustle (TV series), a 2004–2012 BBC drama series
- Hustle (Nigerian TV series), a 2016–2018 Africa Magic drama series
- MTV Hustle, a 2019 Indian rap reality show
- The Hustle (TV series), a 2013 American comedy-drama series
- Hustle (South African TV series), a 2016 South African music drama series.

== Video games ==
- Hustle, a 1979 arcade game in the Snake video game genre
- ''The Hustle: Detroit Streets'', a 2005 game developed by Blade Interactive, a division of Dark Energy Digital

== Other uses ==
- Hustle (company), a text-messaging platform
- Hustle (professional wrestling), a Japanese professional wrestling promotion 2004–2009
- Hustle, Virginia, US, an unincorporated community
- USS Despatch (1902), U.S. Navy ferry known from 1918 to 1921 as the USS Hustle

== See also ==
- The Real Hustle, a 2004–2011 BBC reality series demonstrating real-life scams
- American Hustle, a 2013 film
- Nipsey Hussle (1985–2019), American rapper
- Hustler (disambiguation)
