= William Dutcher =

Ornithologist and New York insurance businessman

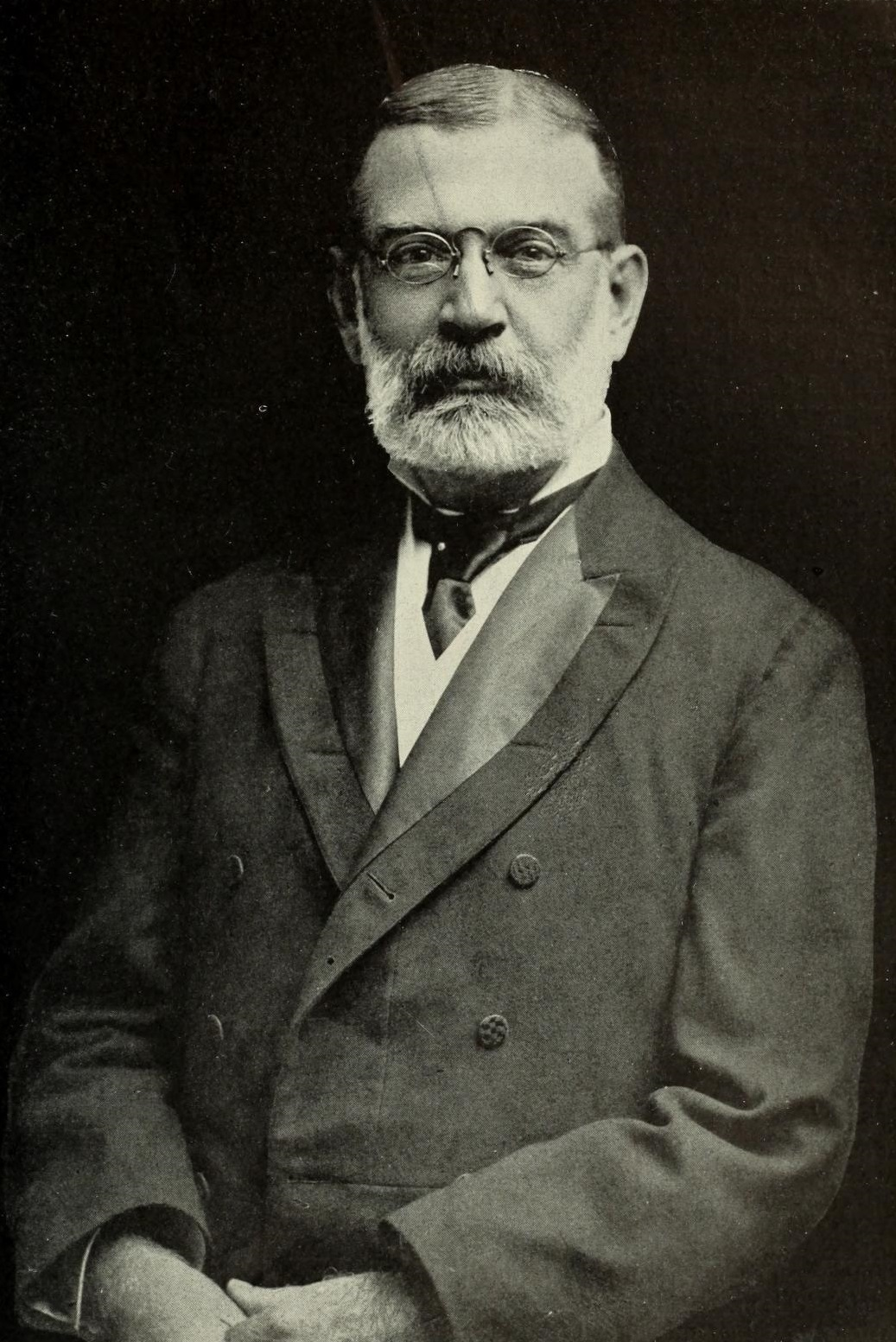
Portrait c. 1903

William Dutcher (20 January 1846 – 1 July 1920) was an American businessman, amateur bird photographer, ornithologist and a keen proponent of bird conservation. Working in a New York insurance company, he provided support to the American Ornithologists' Union (AOU) in its early years by serving as its treasurer and by working with government agencies to help pass key legislations for the protection of birds and the establishment of bird reserves.

== Biography ==
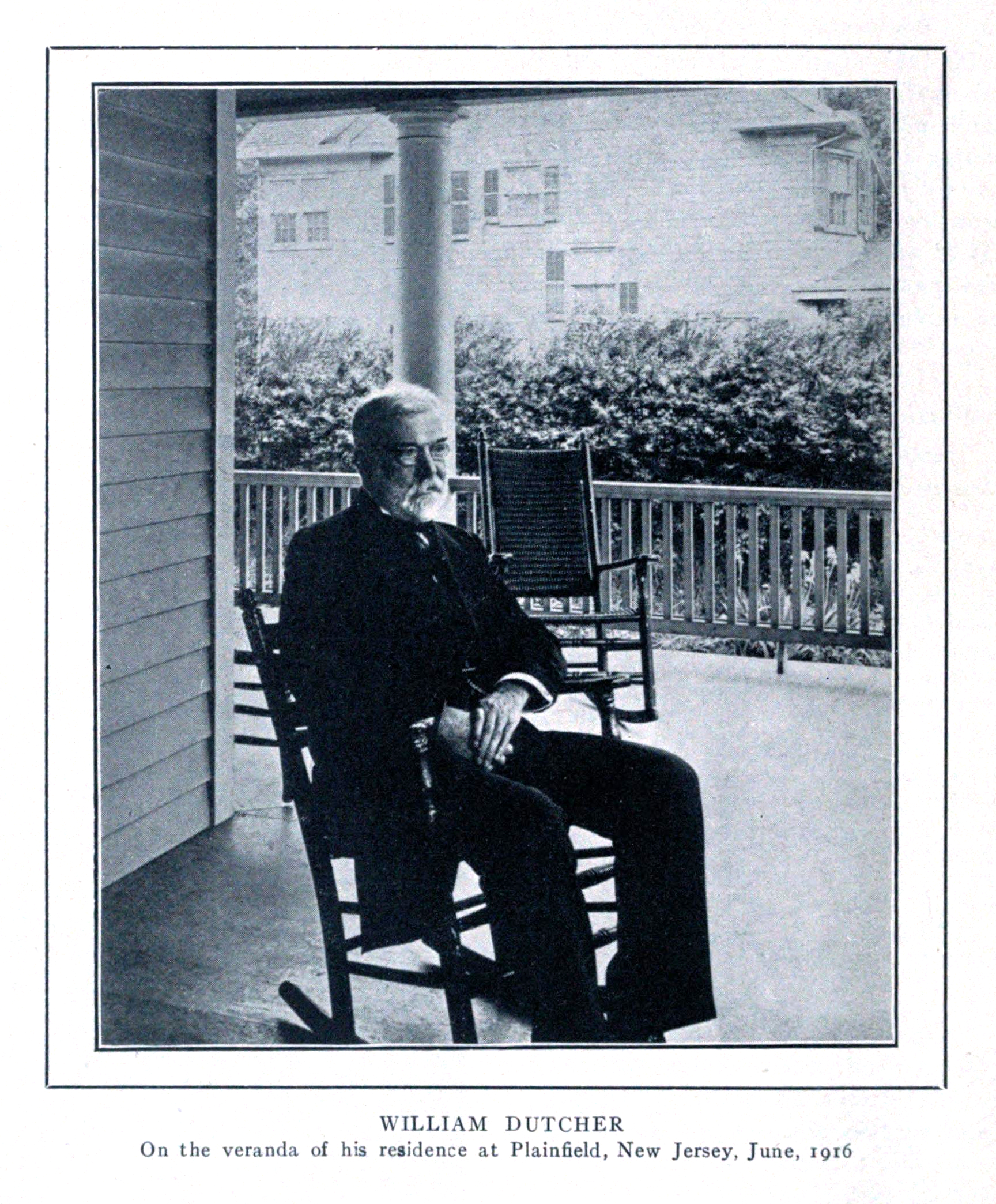
Dutcher in 1916

William Dutcher was born to Rev. Jacob Conklin and Margaretta Ayres Dutcher in Stelton, New Jersey. The family moved to Coxsackie and later Owasco where William studied for a few years. At the age of thirteen he began to work for a banker on Bond Street. He worked for some time near Springfield, Massachusetts on a farm but returned to New York to work with the Brooklyn Life Insurance Company and later the Prudential Insurance Company. On weekends and holidays he went out shooting birds and soon became interested in ornithology. Dutcher took a special interest in the Labrador duck and owned a specimen of the last individual and used it as an example for conservation measures. He became a member of the newly founded American Ornithologists' Union. In 1887 he served as Treasurer for the AOU and held this position for sixteen years. He also chaired the committee on bird protection. Dutcher worked on the passing of the Lacey Act of 1900. He also worked with the US Department of Agriculture to establish Pelican Island as the first National Bird Reserve in 1903. Dutcher helped raise the funds for purchase of land and for supporting the pay of wardens. In 1910, he attended the International Ornithological Congress at Berlin where he spoke on the rationale for international bird protection.

Dutcher married Catharine Oliver Price on May 18, 1870 and they had a son Basil and a daughter Mary who later contracted tuberculosis and died in 1909. The death of his daughter affected Dutcher greatly and led to a decrease in his pursuits and to make matters worse he suffered a stroke in 1910 that paralyzed his right side and made speech impossible. He established a Mary Dutcher Memorial Fund for bird protection. William T. Hornaday's book Our Vanishing Wildlife (1913) was dedicated to Dutcher.
