= Bob Flint =

American sculptor

Bob Flint (born 1941), also known as Robert Flint, is an American ceramic artist. He arrived in Hawaii in 1960 for a summer of surfing and quickly realized that he wanted to stay. In 1961 he entered the University of Hawaii, earning his bachelor's and master's degrees in fine art, with a specialization in ceramics.

For twenty years Bob Flint worked from a studio at his home in Manoa, Hawaii. In 1998 he moved his studio to Haiku-Pauwela, Hawaii on the island of Maui, where he now resides and continues his ceramic work.

Throughout his career, Bob Flint has admired Native Hawaiian feather capes (ʻahuʻula) and has often abstracted their shape. Uila (Lightning) from 2012, in the collection of the Hawaii State Art Museum, demonstrates his adaptation of this Native Hawaiian art. He has also produced large-scale architectural installations for such clients as Amfac Hotels, Bank of Hawaii, Castle Memorial Hospital and the Sheraton at Poipu Beach. He has completed several public works of art for the Hawaii State Foundation on Culture and the Arts:

- A wall of ceramic fish in Waikiki at the intersection of Seaside and Kalakaua avenues.
- Three ceramic murals in the Hawaii Convention Center in Honolulu. The murals surround three drinking fountain areas and are sculpted and carved tile depicting Blue Ginger, Shell Ginger and Torch Ginger.
- A tile sculpture of a "kahili" (ceremonial standard marking the presence of a Hawaiian chief) installed at King Kekaulike High School.
- Hawaiian Mountain Series I, a 1974 ceramic sculpture in Kauikeaouli Hale, Honolulu
- Sandwich Isle, a 1977 ceramic sculpture at Foster Botanical Garden, Honolulu
- Pulelehua (Kamehameha Butterfly), a 1986 ceramic mural at the University of Hawaii at Manoa
