= Polaris Partners =

American investment firm

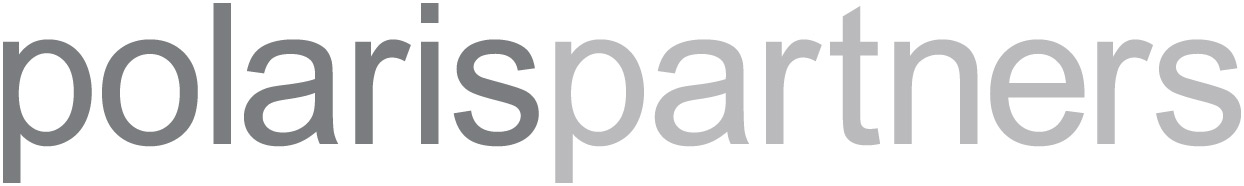
- Type: Private
- Industry: Venture Capital
- Founded: 1996; 30 years ago
- Headquarters: Boston, Massachusetts, United States
- Products: Investments
- AUM: $5.0 billion
- Number of employees: 35+
- Website: www.polarispartners.com

Polaris Partners is a venture capital firm active in the field of healthcare and biotechnology companies. The company has offices in Boston, Massachusetts, New York, New York and San Francisco, California.

== History ==
Polaris Partners was founded in 1996 by Jon Flint, Terry McGuire, Steve Arnold.

The firm has over $5 billion in committed capital and is now making investments through its tenth fund. The current managing partners are Amy Schulman, and Brian Chee.

Polaris Partners also has two affiliate funds. Polaris Growth Fund targets investments in profitable, founder-owned technology companies and is led by managing partners Bryce Youngren and Dan Lombard. Polaris Innovation Fund focuses on the commercial and therapeutic potential of early-stage academic research and is led by managing partners Amy Schulman and Ellie McGuire.

In 2012, Polaris Partners joined New Enterprise Associates as partners of The Experiment Fund of Harvard University.

== See also ==
- Polaris Growth Fund
- Polaris Innovation Fund
