= Biodiversity hotspot =

Biodiverse region under threat

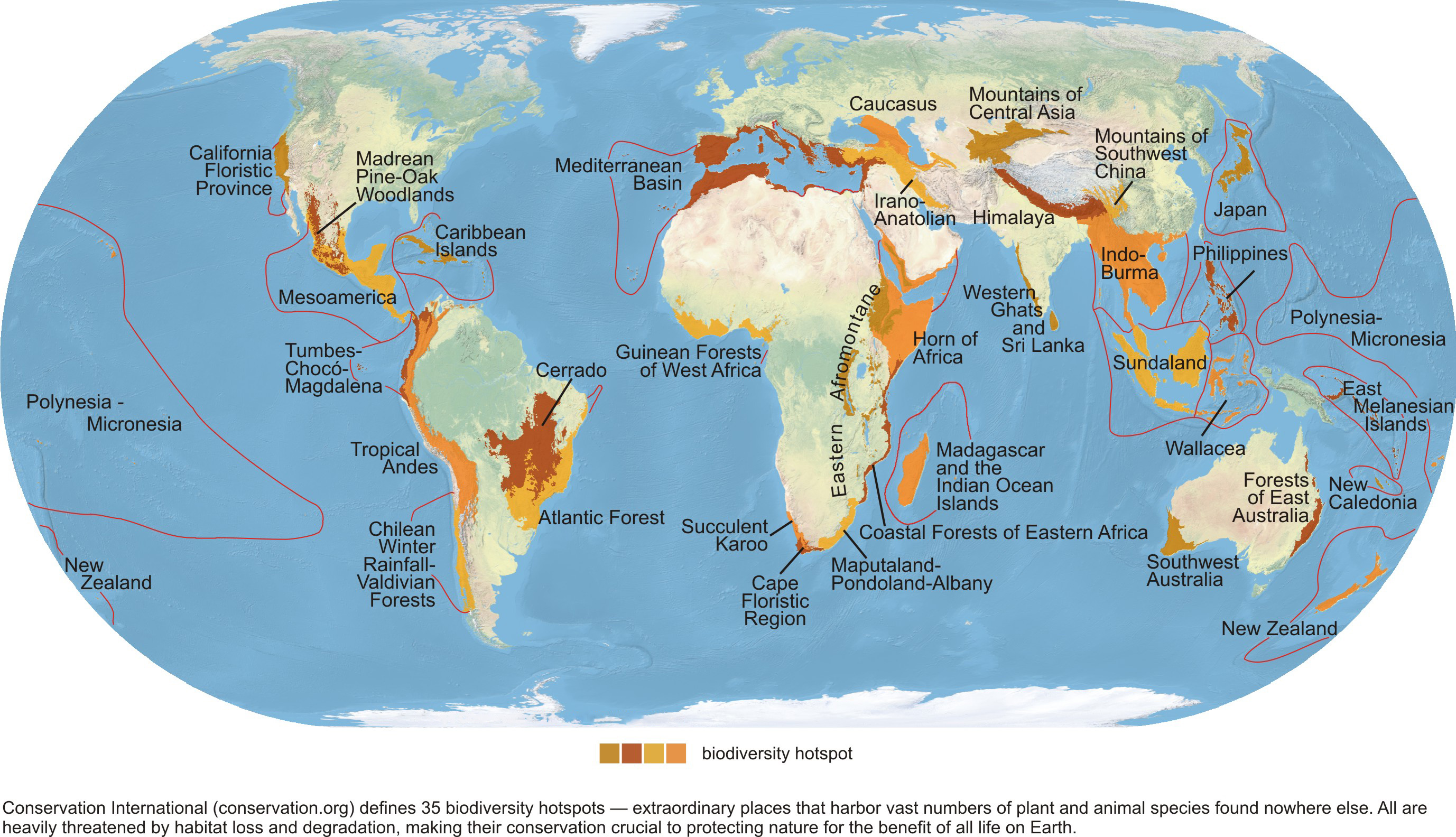
Map of the world's biodiversity hot spots, all of which are heavily threatened by habitat loss and degradation

A biodiversity hotspot is a biogeographic region with significant levels of biodiversity that is threatened by human habitation. Norman Myers wrote about the concept in two articles in The Environmentalist in 1988 and 1990, after which the concept was revised following thorough analysis by Myers and others into "Hotspots: Earth's Biologically Richest and Most Endangered Terrestrial Ecoregions" and a paper published in the journal Nature, both in 2000.

To qualify as a biodiversity hotspot on Myers' 2000 edition of the hotspot map, a region must meet two strict criteria: it must contain at least 1,500 species of vascular plants (more than 0.5% of the world's total) as endemics, and it has to have lost at least 70% of its primary vegetation. Globally, 36 zones qualify under this definition. These sites support nearly 60% of the world's plant, bird, mammal, reptile, and amphibian species, with a high share of those species as endemics. Some of these hotspots support up to 15,000 endemic plant species, and some have lost up to 95% of their natural habitat.

Biodiversity hotspots host their diverse ecosystems on just 2.4% of the planet's surface. Ten hotspots were originally identified by Myer; the current 36 used to cover more than 15.7% of all the land but have lost around 85% of their area. This loss of habitat is why approximately 60% of the world's terrestrial life lives on only 2.4% of the land surface area. Caribbean Islands like Haiti and Jamaica are facing serious pressures on the populations of endemic plants and vertebrates as a result of rapid deforestation. Other areas include the Tropical Andes, Philippines, Mesoamerica, and Sundaland, which, under the current levels at which deforestation is occurring, will likely lose most of their plant and vertebrate species.

== Hotspot conservation initiatives ==
Only a small percentage of the total land area within biodiversity hotspots is now protected. Several international organizations are working to conserve biodiversity hotspots.

- Critical Ecosystem Partnership Fund (CEPF) is a global program that provides funding and technical assistance to nongovernmental organizations in order to protect the Earth's richest regions of plant and animal diversity, including biodiversity hotspots, high-biodiversity wilderness areas and important marine regions.
- The World Wide Fund for Nature has devised a system called the "Global 200 Ecoregions", the aim of which is to select priority ecoregions for conservation from fourteen terrestrial, three freshwater, and four marine habitat types. They are chosen for species richness, endemism, taxonomic uniqueness, unusual ecological or evolutionary phenomena, and global rarity. All biodiversity hotspots contain at least one Global 200 Ecoregion.
- Birdlife International has identified 218 "Endemic Bird Areas" (EBAs) each of which holds two or more bird species found nowhere else. Birdlife International has identified more than 11,000 Important Bird Areas all over the world.
- Plant life International coordinates programs aiming to identify and manage Important Plant Areas.
- Alliance for Zero Extinction is an initiative of scientific organizations and conservation groups who co-operate to focus on the most threatened endemic species of the world. They have identified 595 sites, including many Birdlife's Important Bird Areas.
- The National Geographic Society has prepared a world map of the hotspots and ArcView shapefile and metadata for the Biodiversity Hotspots including details of the individual endangered fauna in each hotspot, which is available from Conservation International.
- The Compensatory Afforestation Management and Planning Authority (CAMPA) seeks to control the destruction of forests in India.

== Distribution by region ==
Biodiversity hotspots. Original proposal in green, and added regions in blue.

Most biodiversity exists within the tropics; likewise, most hotspots are tropical. Of the 34 biodiversity hotspots, 15 are classified as old, climatically-buffered, infertile landscapes (OCBILs). These areas have been historically isolated from interactions with other climate zones, but recent human interaction and encroachment have put these historically safe hotspots at risk. OCBILs have mainly been threatened by the relocation of indigenous groups and military actions, as the infertile ground has previously dissuaded human populations. The conservation of OCBILs within biodiversity hotspots has started to garner attention because current theories believe these sites provide not only high levels of biodiversity, but they have relatively stable lineages and the potential for high levels of speciation in the future. Because these sites are relatively stable, they can be classified as refugia.

North and Central America

- California Floristic Province (8)
- Madrean pine–oak woodlands (26)
- Mesoamerica (2)
- North American Coastal Plain (36) — consisting of the Atlantic Plain and Gulf Coastal Plain

The Caribbean

- Caribbean Islands (3)

South America

- Atlantic Forest (4)
- Cerrado (6)
- Chilean Winter Rainfall-Valdivian Forests (7)
- Tumbes–Chocó–Magdalena (5)
- Tropical Andes (1)

Europe and West Asia

- Mediterranean Basin (14)
- Caucasus (15)
- Irano-Anatolian (30)

Africa

- Cape Floristic Region (12)
- Coastal Forests of Eastern Africa (10)
- Eastern Afromontane (28)
- Guinean Forests of West Africa (11)
- Horn of Africa (29)
- Madagascar and the Indian Ocean Islands (9)
- Maputaland-Pondoland-Albany (27)
- Succulent Karoo (13)

Central Asia

- Mountains of Central Asia (31)

South Asia

- Himalaya (32)
- Indo-Burma (19)
- Western Ghats and Sri Lanka (21)

Southeast Asia and Asia-Pacific

- East Melanesian Islands (34)
- New Caledonia (23)
- New Zealand (24)
- Philippines (18)
- Polynesia-Micronesia (25)
- Eastern Australian temperate forests (35)
- Southwest Australia (22)
- Sundaland, Indonesia and Nicobar Islands of India (16)
- Wallacea of Indonesia (17)

East Asia

- Japan (33)
- Mountains of Southwest China (20)

== Criticism ==
The high profile of the biodiversity hotspots approach has resulted in some criticism. Papers such as Kareiva & Marvier (2003) have pointed out that biodiversity hotspots (and many other priority region sets) do not address the concept of cost, and do not consider phylogenetic diversity.

== See also ==
- Biodiversity – Variety and variability of life forms
- Conservation biology – Study of threats to biological diversity
- Crisis ecoregion
- Ecoregion – Ecological and geographical area
- Global 200 – List of ecoregions identified by the WWF
- Hawaiian honeycreeper conservation
- High-Biodiversity Wilderness Area – IUCN protected area classification
- Hope spot – American marine biologist and oceanographer: biodiversity hotspots in the open sea
- Key Biodiversity Area
- Megadiverse countries – Nations with extremely high biological diversity or many endemic species
- Protected area – Areas protected for having ecological or cultural importance
- Wilderness – Undisturbed natural environment
- Type locality hotspots
