= Key Biodiversity Area =

Key Biodiversity Areas (KBAs) are geographical regions that have been determined to be of international importance in terms of biodiversity conservation, using globally standardized criteria published by the IUCN as part of a collaboration between scientists, conservation groups, and government bodies across the world. The purpose of Key Biodiversity Areas is to identify regions that are in need of protection by governments or other agencies. KBAs extend the Important Bird Area (IBA) concept to other taxonomic groups and are now being identified in many parts of the world. Examples of types of KBAs include Important Plant Areas (IPAs), Ecologically and Biologically Significant Areas (EBSAs) in the High Seas, Alliance for Zero Extinction (AZE) sites, Prime Butterfly Areas, Important Mammal Areas and Important Sites for Freshwater Biodiversity, with prototype criteria developed for freshwater molluscs and fish and for marine systems. The determination of KBAs often brings sites onto the conservation agenda that hadn't previously been identified as needing protection due to the nature of the two non-exclusive criteria used to determine them; vulnerability; and irreplaceability.

The KBA global standard was published in 2016.

A designation for abiotic nature, Key Geoheritage Area (KGA), was added at the IUCN World Congress in Abu Dhabi in October 2025.

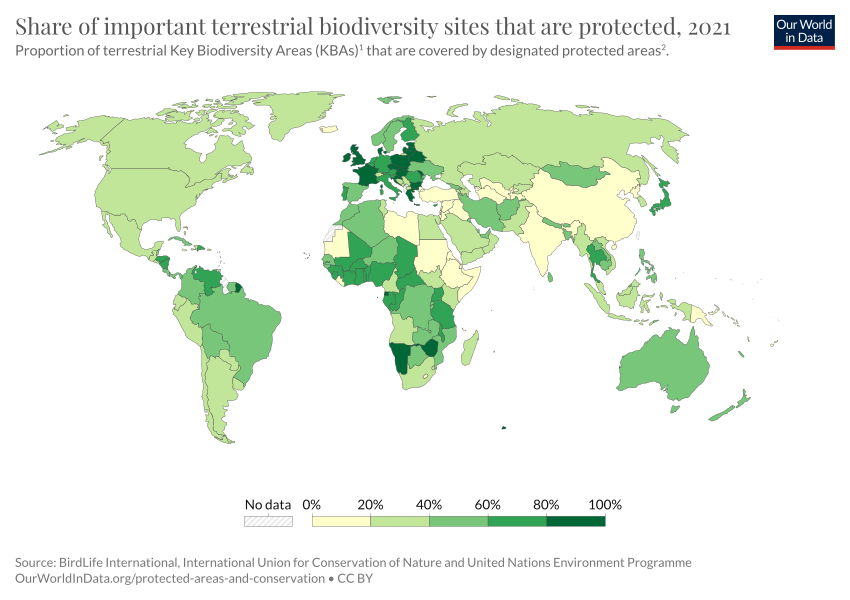
A map showing the proportion of terrestrial Key Biodiversity Areas that are covered by designated protected areas by country

== Objectives ==
- Develop technical and conservation capacity within individual countries and on a global scale
- Develop partnerships between key organizations – both governmental and nongovernmental – concerned with site conservation
- Build broad understanding of the process, and broad ownership of the final site list
- Focus any new survey work on the most important gaps in knowledge

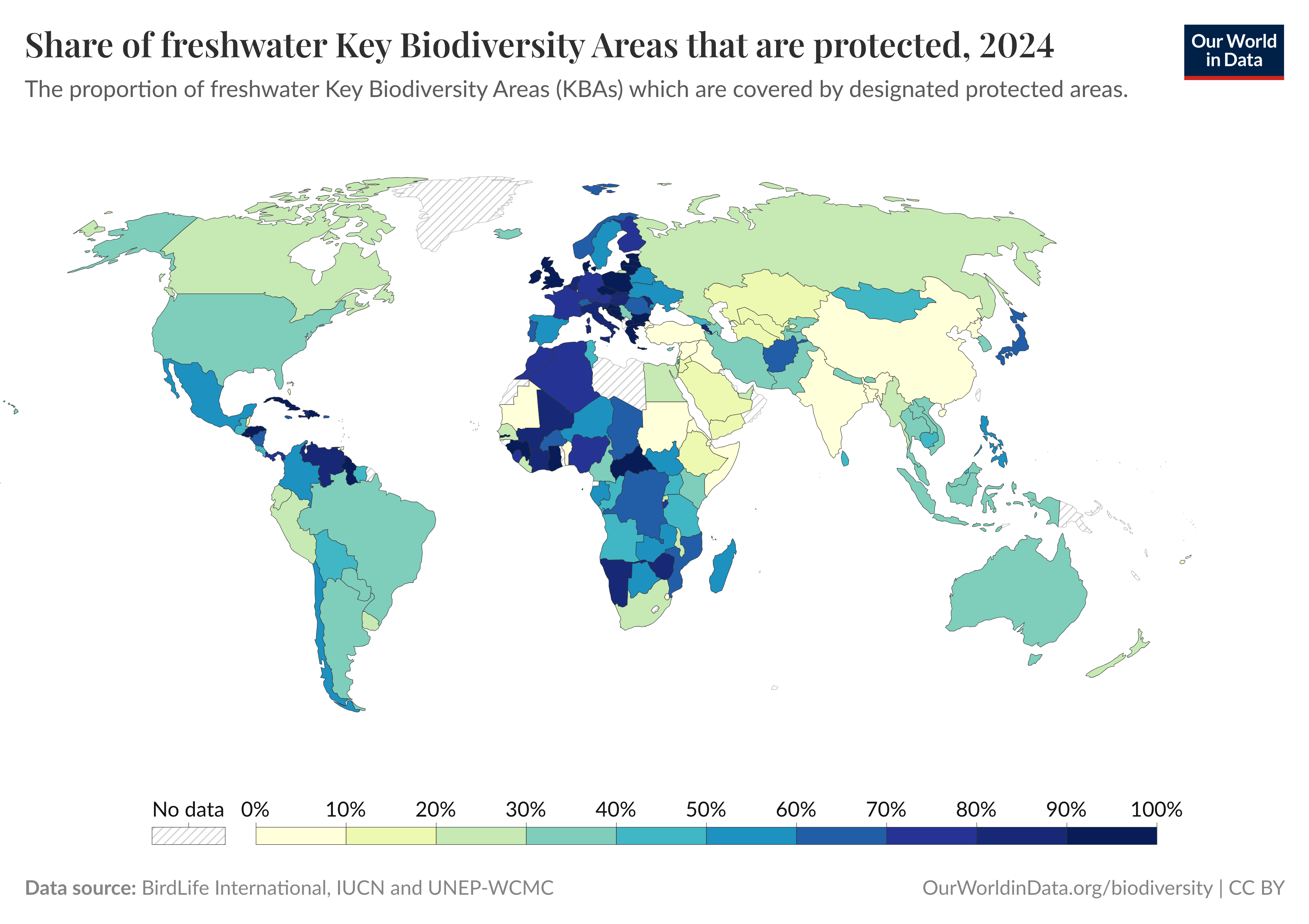
A map showing the proportion of freshwater Key Biodiversity Areas which are covered by designated protected areas by country

== Criteria ==
The criteria for what can qualify as a KBA is one or more of the following:

1. Contains a significant number of endangered species relative to the global population; contains ecosystems that are threatened on a global scale
2. Contains species, taxonomic groups, or ecosystems that are confined to small geographic zones
3. Is relatively untouched by human activity
4. Holds congregations of species at important life stages, such as "breeding, feeding or during migration" or the spawning of offspring; is a "refuge" where species retreat from temporary negative environmental conditions
5. Has a high level of irreplaceability, or "how close a site is to being essential for achieving conservation targets"

== Reception ==
The KBA standard has been applied around the globe to over 16,000 areas with a total 21,000,000 km^{2}, which can be viewed in map form. It is used by scientists to assess fragmentation and habitat loss in vulnerable areas, and is generally seen as an effective method of identifying areas in need of protection.

Some criticism involves the scale of KBAs, such as the use of global data to set parameters for single regions or ecosystems, as well as the lack of involvement of local governments and other authorities- especially in developing countries- in their implementation. Other issues raised include the defining of conservation strictly in terms of location, and the naming of single species as important to the environment rather than the interconnectivity between species and doesn't prioritize areas that are dense in biological diversity. Some argue, however, that KBAs are meant to be a "focused response to a central problem in conservation" rather than a catch-all solution. Criteria may also be too broad, as one analysis found that between 26% and 68% of all terrestrial land on Earth could be classified as a KBA.

== See also ==
- Conservation biology
- Ecoregions
- Biodiversity
- Crisis Ecoregions
- High conservation value area
- High-Biodiversity Wilderness Areas
- Biodiversity Hotspots
- Biosphere Reserves
- Site-based conservation
- Protected Areas
