= River Ridge Institute =

Research site in California, US

Coordinates: 36.162°N 118.799°W

River Ridge Institute is located on a 722-acre working landscape situated within the Sierra Nevada foothills of the Central Valley of California, in Tulare County. It serves as a field site for scientific research and education, and functions as a working landscape formed around sustainable land practices and conservation. Along with research and education, the site is also used for public programs. The site is listed by the Organization of Biological Field Stations as a biological field station on the North Fork of the Tule River.

== History ==
The area was home to indigenous people for thousands of years, with evidence of their presence being found throughout the site. River Ridge Ranch, originally named Negus Ranch, was founded in the late 1990s by Doctor Gary Adest and Doctor Barbara Brydolf after purchasing the land from the Negus family. River Ridge Institute was created as a 501(c)(3) educational non-profit in 2015. The site was originally colonized in the 1850s by the McKiernan family, who settled there after the Native Americans were removed. The Negus family purchased about 1100 acres in 1909 and ran cattle on the ranch for many years. The land faced threats of subdivision as real estate developers gained increasing interest in rural areas as space for building large-scale housing communities. Gary Adest and Barbara Brydolf worked with The Conservation Fund during efforts to keep the ranch from being sold for development. The California Conservation Easement Database shows a 722-acre conservation easement titled River Ridge under Sequoia Riverlands Trust, which was originally established in 2002 as a perpetual conservation easement held by The Conservation Fund. The purpose of the easement was to protect the property's natural, scenic, agricultural, and open-space values, including Tule River riparian habitat and oak woodlands. The Conservation Fund raised donations and was able to offer the Negus family funding to keep and protect the ranch rather than sell it to developers. Ultimately, the family decided not to accept the offer, but to ensure that the land would be permanently protected, Drs. Adest and Brydolf purchased the 700+ acre ranch in 1998. Upon assuming ownership, Dr. Gary Adest and Dr. Barbara Brydolf renamed the ranch River Ridge, for the Tule River at the lowest point, to the mountain ridge of the Giant Sequoia National Monument at the highest. In order to generate revenue to pay off the ranch, they hosted activities such as weddings, retreats, elementary school classes, and camping, along with cattle grazing, hunting, and a wireless internet site serving Springville, CA. Over time, Adest and Brydolf stopped hosting weddings and reduced grazing in order to emphasize outdoor uses such as university classes, research, and camping. In 2010, county planning proceedings addressed the ranch’s use for educational, recreational, charitable, and limited commercial events, and a special-use permit was later granted for use of a five-acre portion of the site subject to county restrictions. 1

River Ridge Institute now has Memoranda of Understanding with the Geography Department at California State University, Long Beach, the UC Merced Natural Reserve System, and the tribal Native Star Foundation.

The ranch currently functions as a biological field station and also hosts public programs.

== Site description ==
The site is located along the North Fork of the Tule River in oak lands in Springville, Tulare County, California. The site also includes a fully enclosed watershed and several seasonal streams in addition to the North Fork of the Tule River. Oak woodlands have “higher levels of biodiversity than virtually any other terrestrial ecosystem in California". “More than one million acres of California's oak woodlands are developed and approximately 750,000 are at risk of development before 2040.” These landscapes play an important role in biodiversity, carbon storage, and water resources. It consists of chaparral, riparian, oak woodland and pasture habitats across its 722 acres. The field-station description for River Ridge identifies about 8 hectares of riparian corridor, 50 hectares of old-field experimental area, and 240 hectares of blue oak woodland and chaparral, and notes that the site borders Giant Sequoia National Monument.

== Ethnography ==
The Central California Foothills are historically associated with Yokuts peoples, an Indigenous group made up of more than forty tribes. The site, located on the Middle and North Forks of the Tule River, was originally inhabited by the Yaudanchi Yokuts. River Ridge has a documented partnership with Native Star Foundation, which aims to empower Native American youth through cultural, mentorship, and development practices.

== Importance ==
River Ridge has been used by the Native Star Foundation for cultural programming and youth activities involving members of the Tule River and other tribes. The ranch is also used for environmental education, restoration activities, university field courses, and community programs, and is protected by a conservation easement under Sequoia Riverlands Trust. The conservation easement permanently restricts development and preserves habitat, open space, and working-land uses such as education, recreation, and ranching.

== Environmental research ==
River Ridge Institute serves as a field site for ecological research in the Southern Sierra Nevada foothills, an at-risk ecosystem in California. California State University, Long Beach’s NSF Research Experiences for Undergraduates program uses River Ridge Ranch as a field site for training in conservation science and geospatial technologies. The CSULB REU program includes a five-week intensive study at the ranch and concludes with formal presentations of research findings. California State University, Long Beach undergraduate students, masters' students, and NSF REU (National Science Foundation Research Experience for Undergrads) students use River Ridge Institute to conduct environmental studies. In 2022, student projects presented at River Ridge included studies of soil carbon, bird biodiversity monitoring, and drone-based analysis of tree biomass. River Ridge has also hosted Trout in the Classroom activities and public restoration field trips. River Ridge is used as a field site for research on California oak woodlands and working-land management. A 2024 master’s thesis based on UAV imagery collected at River Ridge Ranch from 2018 to 2022 found that west-facing slopes showed the greatest oak mortality after adjusting for tree density and concluded that tree density influenced mortality more than topography.
