= Human biome =

Human biome might refer to:

- Anthropogenic biome, ecosystems on the earth shaped by human influence
- Human microbiome, the ecosystem of microorganisms that inhabit the human body
