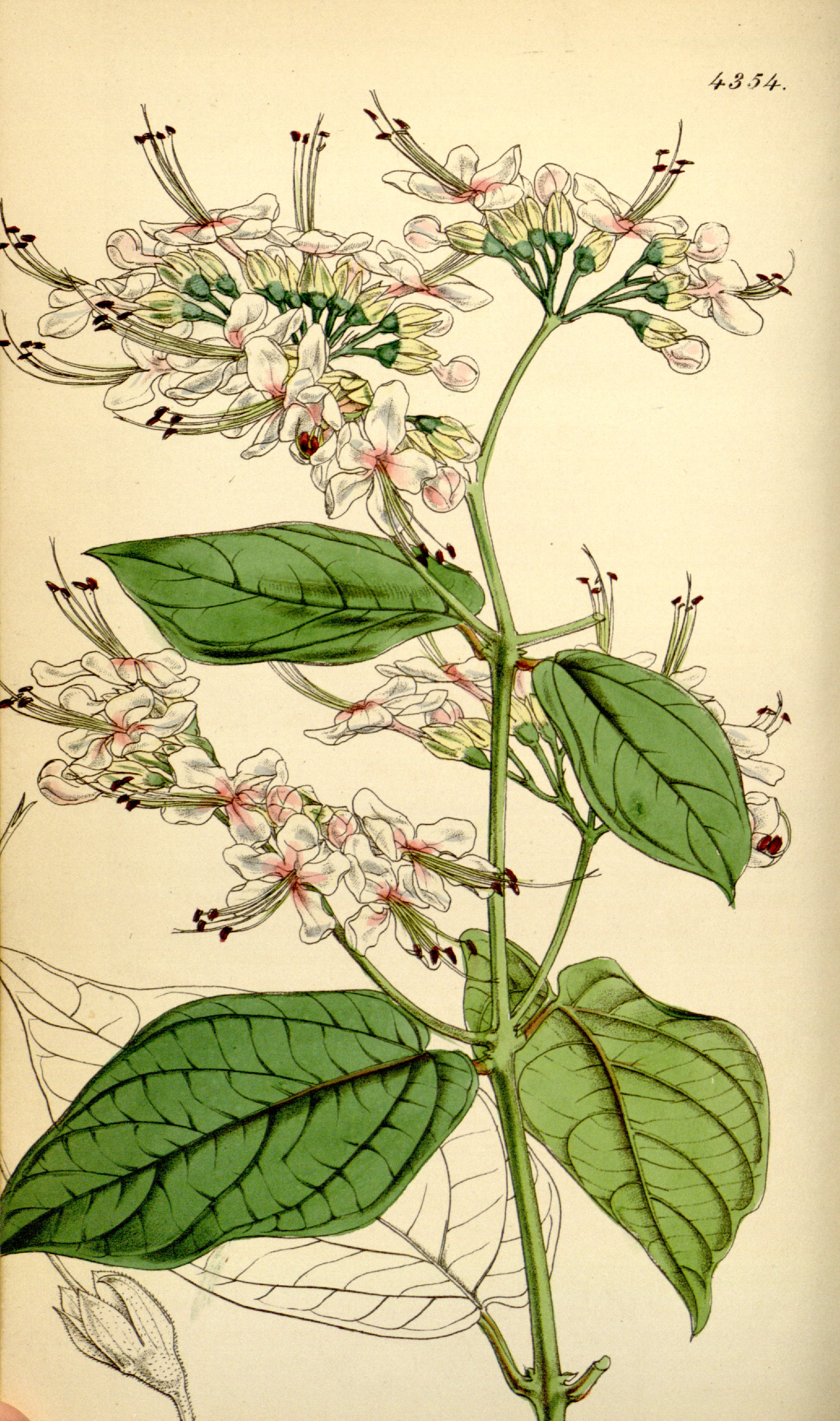

Scientific classification
- Kingdom: Plantae
- Clade: Tracheophytes
- Clade: Angiosperms
- Clade: Eudicots
- Clade: Asterids
- Order: Lamiales
- Family: Lamiaceae
- Genus: Clerodendrum
- Species: C. umbellatum

Binomial name
- Clerodendrum umbellatum Poir.

Synonyms
- Clerodendrum congense Engl.; Clerodendrum cordifolium (Hochst.) A.Rich.; Clerodendrum hirsutum G.Don; Clerodendrum scandens P.Beauv.; Clerodendrum scandens var. asperifolium B.Thomas; Clerodendrum scandens var. speciosum B.Thomas; Clerodendrum simplex G.Don; Clerodendrum umbellatum f. scandens (P.Beauv.) Moldenke; Clerodendrum umbellatum var. speciosum Moldenke; Volkameria cordifolia Hochst.

= Clerodendrum umbellatum =

Species of flowering plant

Clerodendrum umbellatum is a scandent African shrub of the family Lamiaceae, but previously placed in Verbenaceae. It is found in Tropical Africa, Central America and Tropical Asia, its distribution being to some extent anthropogenic, and is often planted for its showy flowers. The genus Clerodendrum is large with more than 300 species currently accepted.

This climber, first described in 1804 by Jean Louis Marie Poiret, has slender, finely pubescent branches. Leaves are oblong to ovate-elliptic, with entire margins, an acute apex, and subcordate base; petiole is from 2–8 cm in length. Inflorescence of umbellate cymes is terminal and many-flowered. The fragrant flowers may be red or white, with a pink or red tinge to the centre. Calyx cup-shaped, with 5 lobes; corolla-tube puberulous, also 5-lobed. Drupe bluish-black, enclosed by a red calyx, and splitting into 4 pyrenes when mature.

== Medicinal ==
The species has been used traditionally in some Central African countries for treating several diseases including intestinal helminthiasis. An extract of its bitter leaves is effective against Schistosoma mansoni. The leaf and its sap are used as pain-killers, while the roots are taken for stomach ailments. Extracts of the leaves are employed as abortifacients, ecbolics and for curing venereal diseases. It is also used to treat dropsy, swellings, oedema and gout, and as an antidote for venomous stings and bites. In Northern Uganda a study found this species to be the most frequently used medicinal plant.
