= Compensatory Afforestation Fund Act, 2016 =

Parliament of India
- Long title: An Act to provide for the establishment of funds under the public accounts of India and the public accounts of each State and crediting thereto the monies received from the user agencies towards compensatory afforestation, additional compensatory afforestation, penal compensatory afforestation, net present value and all other amounts recovered from such agencies under the Forest (Conservation) Act, 1980; constitution of an authority at national level and at each of the State and Union territory Administration for administration of the funds and to utilise the monies so collected for undertaking artificial regeneration (plantations), assisted natural regeneration, protection of forests, forest related infrastructure development, Green India Programme, wildlife protection and other related activities and for matters connected therewith or incidental thereto.
- Citation: Act No. 38 of 2016
- Territorial extent: whole of India
- Passed by: Lok Sabha
- Passed: 3 May 2016
- Passed by: Rajya Sabha
- Passed: 28 July 2016
- Assented to by: President
- Assented to: 3 August 2016
- Commenced: 30 September 2018

Legislative history

Initiating chamber: Lok Sabha
- Bill title: Compensatory Afforestation Fund Bill, 2015
- Bill citation: Bill No. 153-C of 2015
- Introduced by: Prakash Javadekar, MoEFCC
- Introduced: 8 May 2015
- Standing Committee: 21 May 2015–26 February 2016
- Passed: 3 May 2016

Revising chamber: Rajya Sabha
- Passed: 28 July 2016
- Status: In force

The Compensatory Afforestation Fund Act, 2016 (CAMPA Act) is an Indian legislation that seeks to provide an appropriate institutional mechanism, both at the Center and in each State and Union Territory, to ensure expeditious utilization efficiently and transparently of amounts released instead of forest land diverted for non-forest purposes, which would mitigate the impact of diversion of such forest land. The Act and the related CAF Rules, 2018, were notified on 10 August 2018, and the Act came into force w.e.f. 30 September 2018.

== History ==
The Ministry of Environment and Forest, New Delhi, issued a notification on 23 April 2004 describing the constitution, management, and functions of the CAMPA committee. The act was sent for examination under a standing committee. It was passed by the Rajya Sabha on 28 July 2016.

== Compensatory Afforestation Fund ==
This is money paid by developers who have cleared forest land for their construction projects, and the idea is that such land destroyed needs to be made good by regenerating forest elsewhere on non-forest land.

== Purpose ==
The legislation established the Compensatory Afforestation Management and Planning Authority (CAMPA) and the Compensatory Afforestation Fund (CAF). The proposed legislation will also ensure expeditious utilization of accumulated unspent amounts available with the ad hoc Compensatory Afforestation Fund Management and Planning Authority (CAMPA), which presently is of the order of Rs. 95,000 crore, and fresh accrual of compensatory levies and interest on accumulated unspent balance, which will be of the order of approximately Rs. 6,000 crore per annum, efficiently and transparently.

== See also ==
- Compensatory afforestation
- Forest Conservation Act, 1980
- The Scheduled Tribes and Other Traditional Forest Dwellers (Recognition of Forest Rights) Act, 2006
