= Site-based conservation =

Approach to nature conservation

Site-based conservation is an approach to nature conservation that relies on the designation of important or representative examples of sites supporting key habitats or species, such as Key Biodiversity Areas (KBAs) or Important Bird Areas (IBAs). Whilst a rational way of ensuring that the very best resources are protected, it is open to a number of criticisms:

- It tends to focus resources and protection on only the best sites.
- With a changing climate, the best sites now may not be the best ones to protect for the future.
- Wildlife is ignorant of lines drawn on maps by humans.

On balance, site-based conservation is an essential part of nature conservation, along with initiatives such as environmental subsidies and planning controls that protect biodiversity across the whole landscape (the broad and shallow approach), and the more holistic ideas of landscape-scale conservation.
