= Multifunctional landscape =

Type of landscape

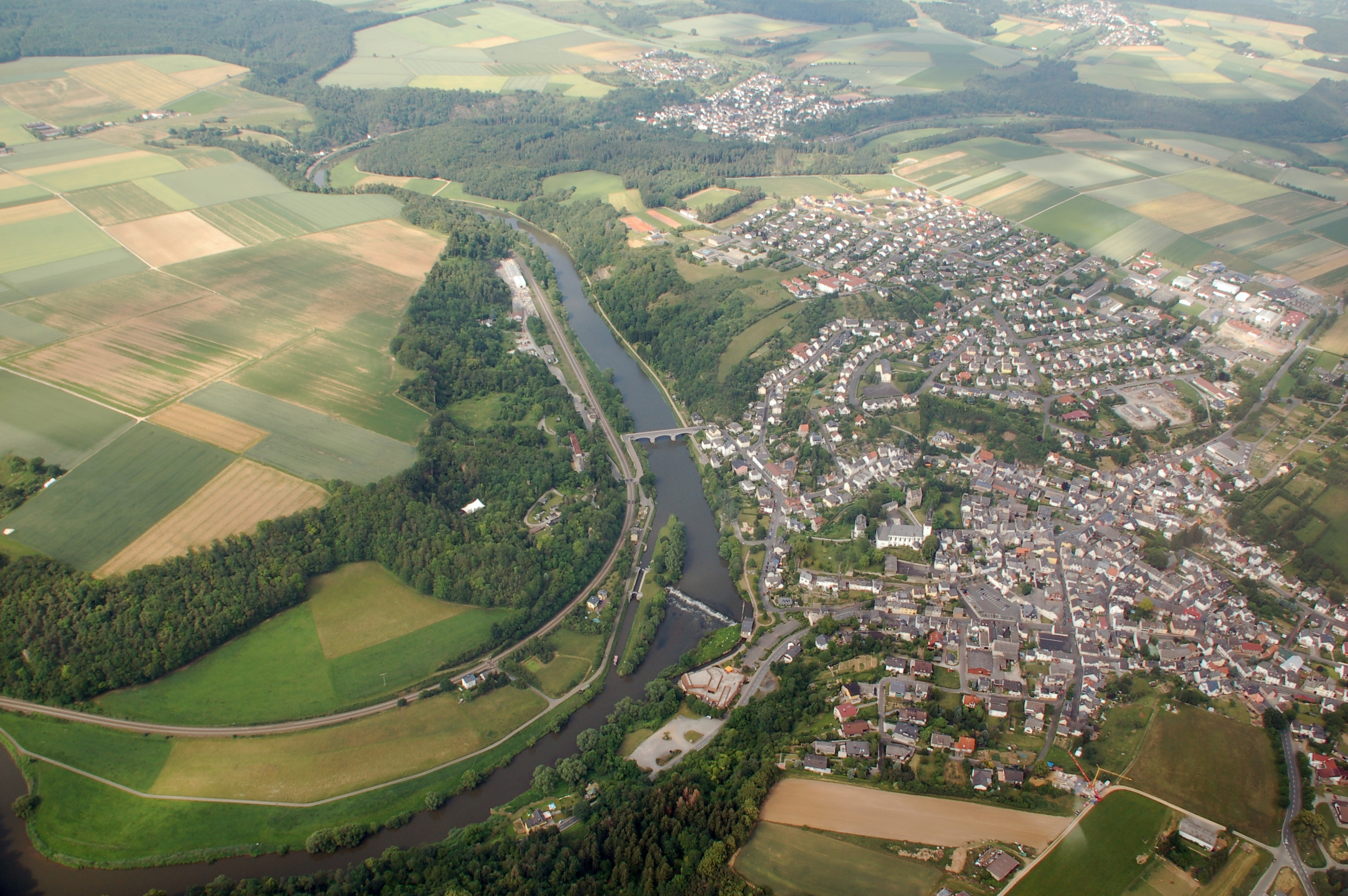
Example of a multifunctional landscape in Hesse, Germany.

Multifunctional landscapes are composed of lands used for multiple different purposes, including agriculture, forestry, settlements, recreation, conservation and restoration. With different parts of the landscape sustaining people and other species, multifunctional landscapes are heterogenous mosaics of lands used for agriculture and settlements that also include significant areas of habitats and regenerating ecosystems.

== See also ==
- Landscape ecology
- Agroecology
- Landscape-scale conservation
- Land use
- Working landscape
- Anthropogenic biome
