= Landscape-scale conservation =

Holistic approach to landscape management

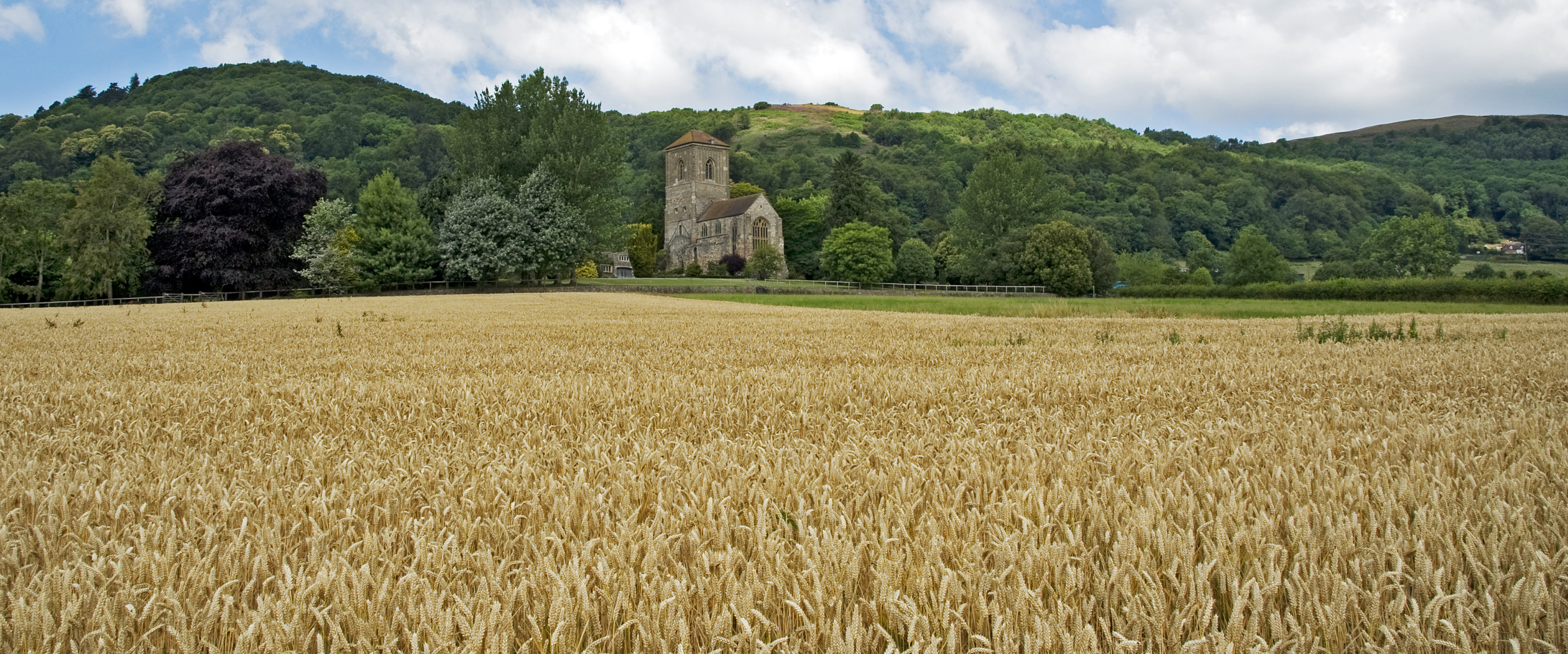
Landscape scale conservation attempts to reconcile competing pressures on the designated Areas of Outstanding Natural Beauty across the United Kingdom.

Landscape-scale conservation is a holistic approach to landscape management, aiming to reconcile the competing objectives of nature conservation and economic activities across a given landscape. Landscape-scale conservation may sometimes be attempted because of climate change. It can be seen as an alternative to site based conservation.

Many global problems such as poverty, food security, climate change, water scarcity, deforestation and biodiversity loss are connected. For example, lifting people out of poverty can increase consumption and drive climate change. Expanding agriculture can exacerbate water scarcity and drive habitat loss. Proponents of landscape management argue that as these problems are interconnected, coordinated approaches are needed to address them, by focussing on how landscapes can generate multiple benefits. For example, a river basin can supply water for towns and agriculture, timber and food crops for people and industry, and habitat for biodiversity; and each one of these users can have impacts on the others.

Landscapes in general have been recognised as important units for conservation by intergovernmental bodies, government initiatives, and research institutes.

Problems with this approach include difficulties in monitoring, and the proliferation of definitions and terms relating to it.

== Definitions ==
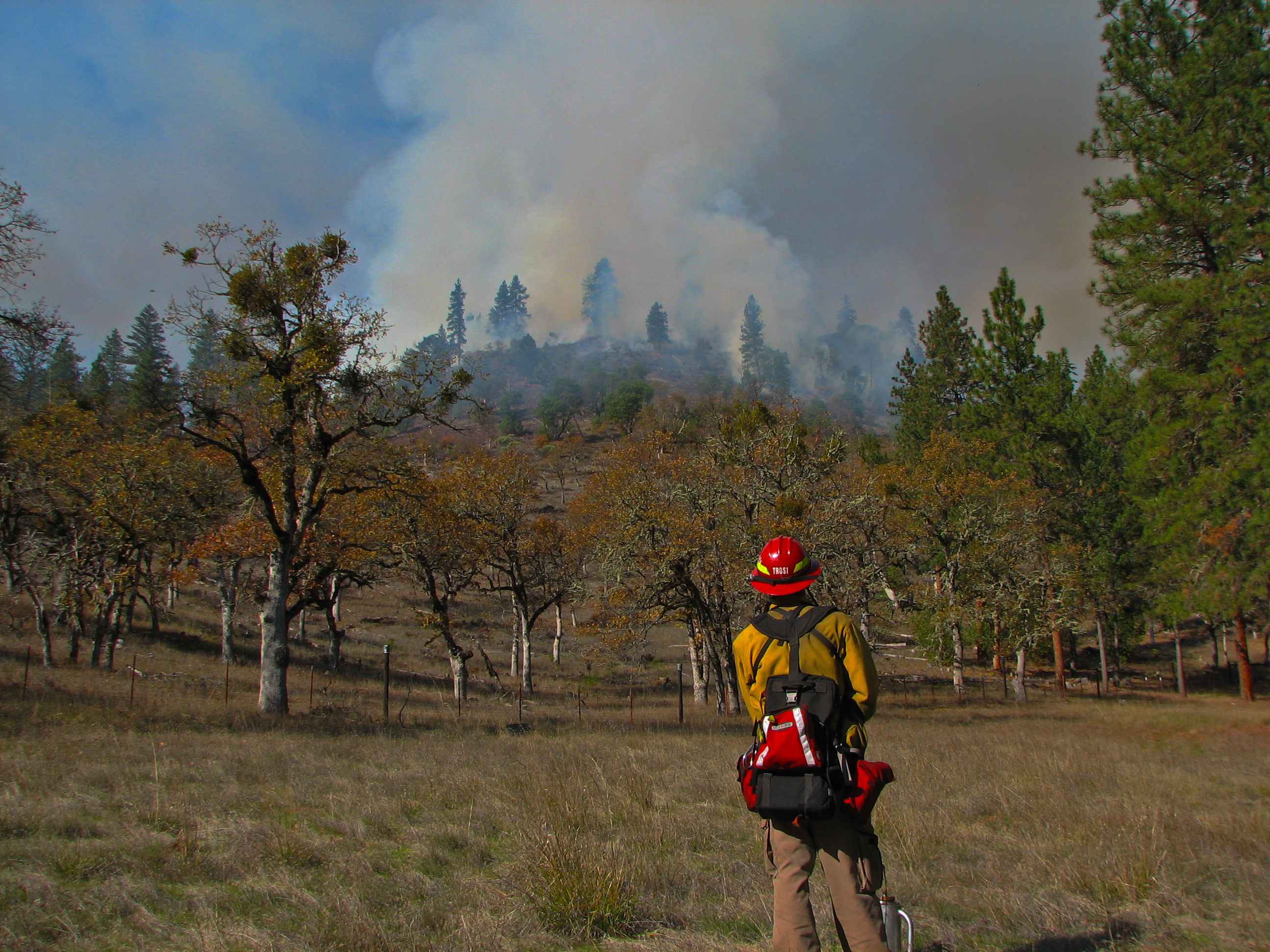
Bureau of Land Management using fire to maintain a landscape in Western Oregon

There are many overlapping terms and definitions, but many terms have similar meanings. A sustainable landscape, for example, meets "the needs of the present without compromising the ability of future generations to meet their own needs."

Approaching conservation by means of landscapes can be seen as "a conceptual framework whereby stakeholders in a landscape aim to reconcile competing social, economic and environmental objectives". Instead of focussing on a single use of the land it aims to ensure that the interests of different stakeholders are met.

The starting point for all landscape-scale conservation schemes must be an understanding of the character of the landscape. Landscape character goes beyond aesthetic. It involves understanding how the landscape functions to support communities, cultural heritage and development, the economy, as well as the wildlife and natural resources of the area. Landscape character requires careful assessment according to accepted methodologies. Landscape character assessment will contribute to the determination of what scale is appropriate in which landscape. "Landscape scale" does not merely mean acting at a bigger scale: it means conservation is carried out at the correct scale and that it takes into account the human elements of the landscape, both past and present.

== History ==
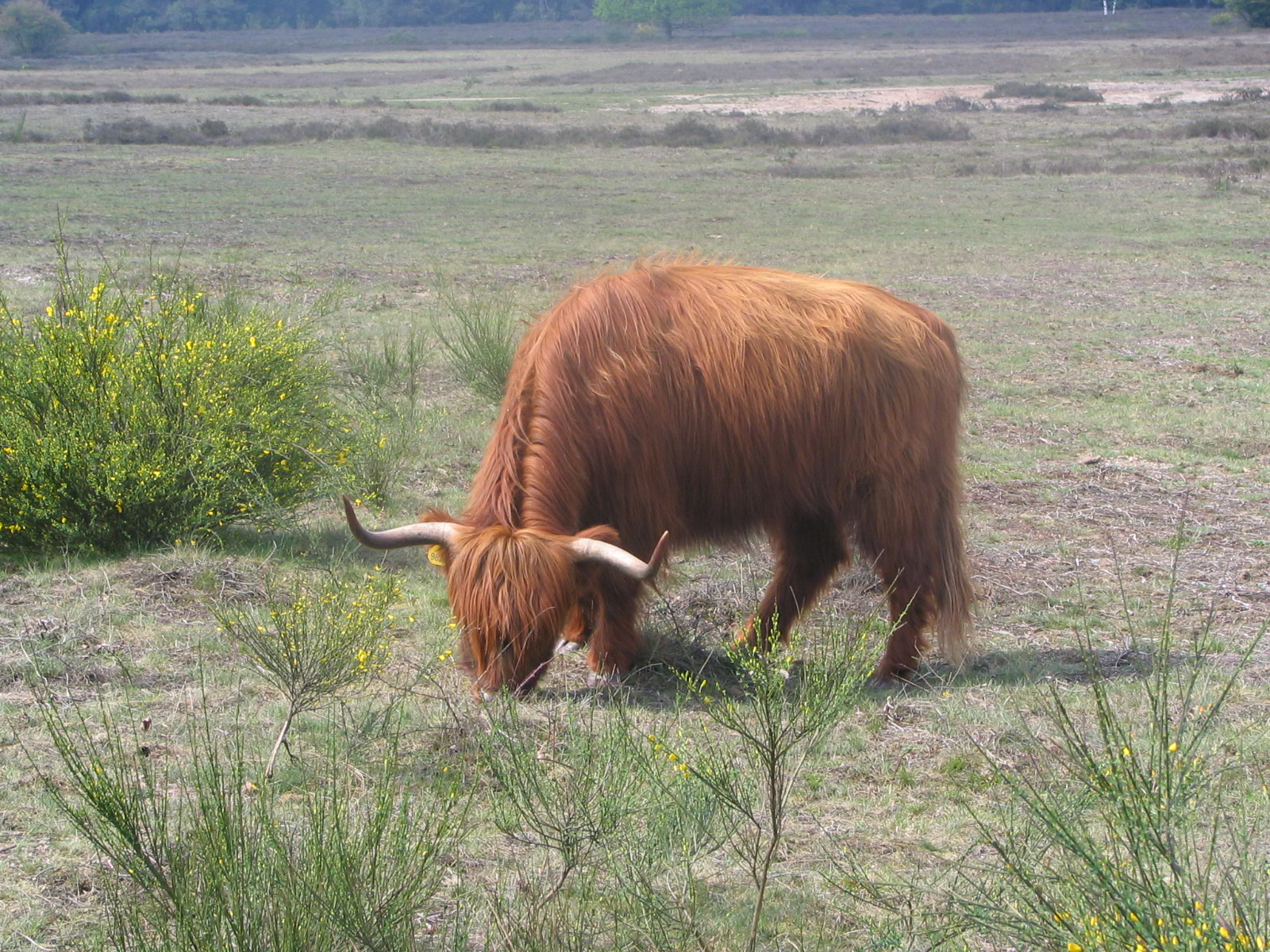
Highland cow helping to maintain the landscape near Hilversum in the Netherlands

The word 'landscape' in English is a loanword from Dutch landschap introduced in the 1660s and originally meant a painting. The meaning a "tract of land with its distinguishing characteristics" was derived from that in 1886. This was then used as a verb as of 1916.

The German geographer Carl Troll coined the German term Landschaftsökologie–thus 'landscape ecology' in 1939. He developed this terminology and many early concepts of landscape ecology as part of this work, which consisted of applying aerial photograph interpretation to studies of interactions between environment, agriculture and vegetation.

In the UK conservation of landscapes can be said to have begun in 1945 with the publication of the Report to the Government on National Parks in England and Wales. The National Parks and Access to the Countryside Act 1949 introduced the legislation for the creation Areas of Outstanding Natural Beauty (AONB). Northern Ireland has the same system after adoption of the Amenity Lands (NI) Act 1965. The first of these AONB were defined in 1956, with the last being created in 1995.

The Permanent European Conference for the Study of the Rural Landscape was established in 1957. The European Landscape Convention was initiated by the Congress of Regional and Local Authorities of the Council of Europe (CLRAE) in 1994, was adopted by the Committee of Ministers of the Council of Europe in 2000, and came into force in 2004.

The conservation community began to take notice of the science of landscape ecology in the 1980s.

Efforts to develop concepts of landscape management that integrate international social and economic development with biodiversity conservation began in 1992.

Landscape management now exists in multiple iterations and alongside other concepts such as watershed management, landscape ecology and cultural landscapes.

== International ==
The UN Environment Programme stated in 2015 that the landscape approach embodies ecosystem management. UNEP uses the approach with the Ecosystem Management of Productive Landscapes project. The scientific committee of the Convention on Biological Diversity also considers the perspective of a landscape the most important scale for improving sustainable use of biodiversity. There are global fora on landscapes. During the Livelihoods and Landscapes Strategies programme the International Union for Conservation of Nature applied this approach to locations worldwide, in 27 landscapes in 23 different countries.

Examples of landscape approaches can be global or continental, for example in Africa, Oceania and Latin America. The European Agricultural Fund for Rural Development plays an important part in funding landscape conservation in Europe.

=== Relevance to international commitments ===
Some argue landscape management can address the Sustainable Development Goals. Many of these goals have potential synergies or trade-offs: some therefore argue that addressing these goals individually may not be effective, and landscape approaches provide a potential framework to manage them. For example, increasing areas of irrigated agricultural land to end hunger could have adverse impacts on terrestrial ecosystems or sustainable water management. Landscape approaches intend to include different sectors, and thus achieve the multiple objectives of the Sustainable Development Goals – for example, working within catchment area of a river to enhance agricultural productivity, flood defence, biodiversity and carbon storage.

Climate change and agriculture are intertwined so production of food and climate mitigation can be a part of landscape management. The agricultural sector accounts for around 24% of anthropogenic emissions. Unlike other sectors that emit greenhouse gases, agriculture and forestry have the potential to mitigate climate change by reducing or removing greenhouse gas emissions, for example by reforestation and landscape restoration. Advocates of landscape management argue that 'climate-smart agriculture' and REDD+ can draw on landscape management.

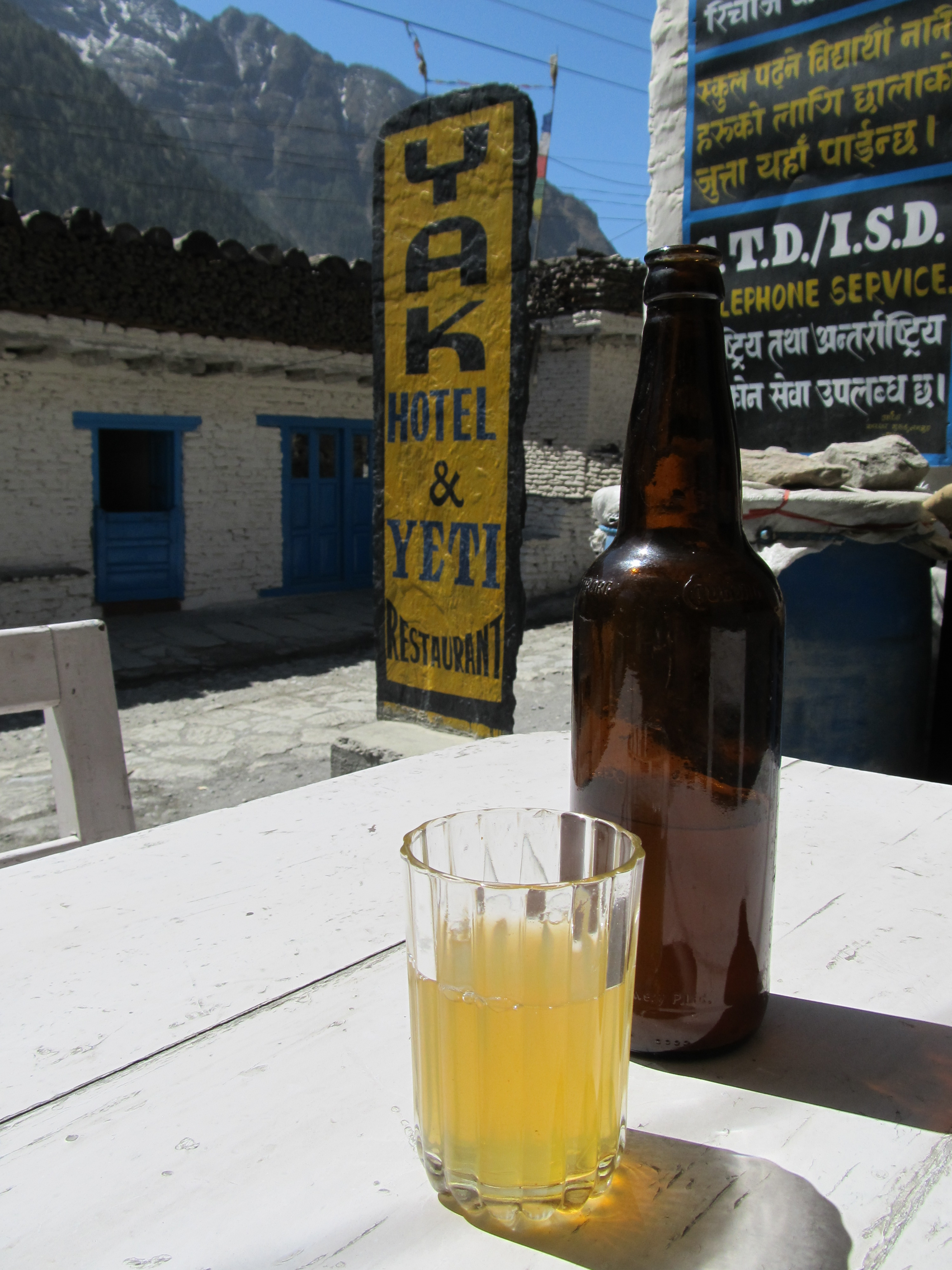
The marketing of products from specific landscapes can assist conservation. This is apple juice from Tukuche village in the Kali Gandaki Gorge, Nepal

== Regional ==
=== Germany ===
Because a large proportion of the biodiversity of Germany was able to invade from the south and east after human activities altered the landscape, maintaining such artificial landscapes is an integral part of nature conservation. The full name of the main nature conservation law in Germany, the Bundesnaturschutzgesetzes, is thus titled in its entirety Gesetz über Naturschutz und Landschaftspflege, where Landschaftspflege translates literally to "landscape maintenance" (see reference for more). Related concepts are Landschaftsschutz, "landscape protection/conservation", and Landschaftsschutzgebiet, a "nature preserve", or literally a (legally) "protected landscape area". The Deutscher Verband für Landschaftspflege is the main organisation which protects landscapes in Germany. It is an umbrella organisation which coordinates the regional landscape protection organisations of the different German states. Classically, there are four methods which can be done in order to conserve landscapes: maintenance, improvement, protection and redevelopment. The marketing of products such as meat from alpine meadows or apple juice from traditional Streuobstwiese can also be an important factor in conservation. Landscapes are maintained by three methods: biological - such as grazing by livestock, manually (although this is rare due to the high cost of labour) and commonly mechanically.

=== The Netherlands ===
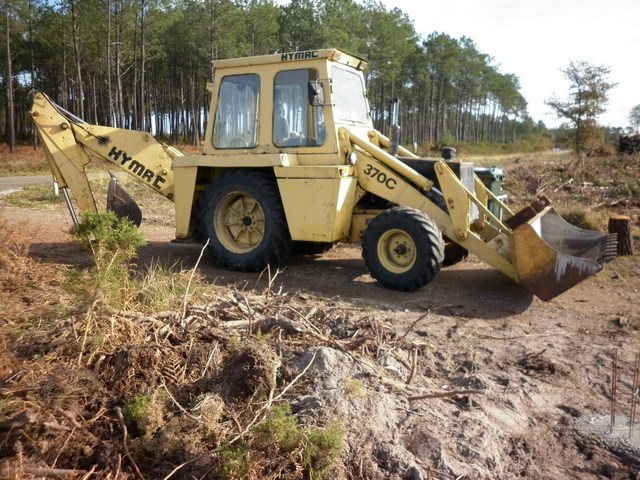
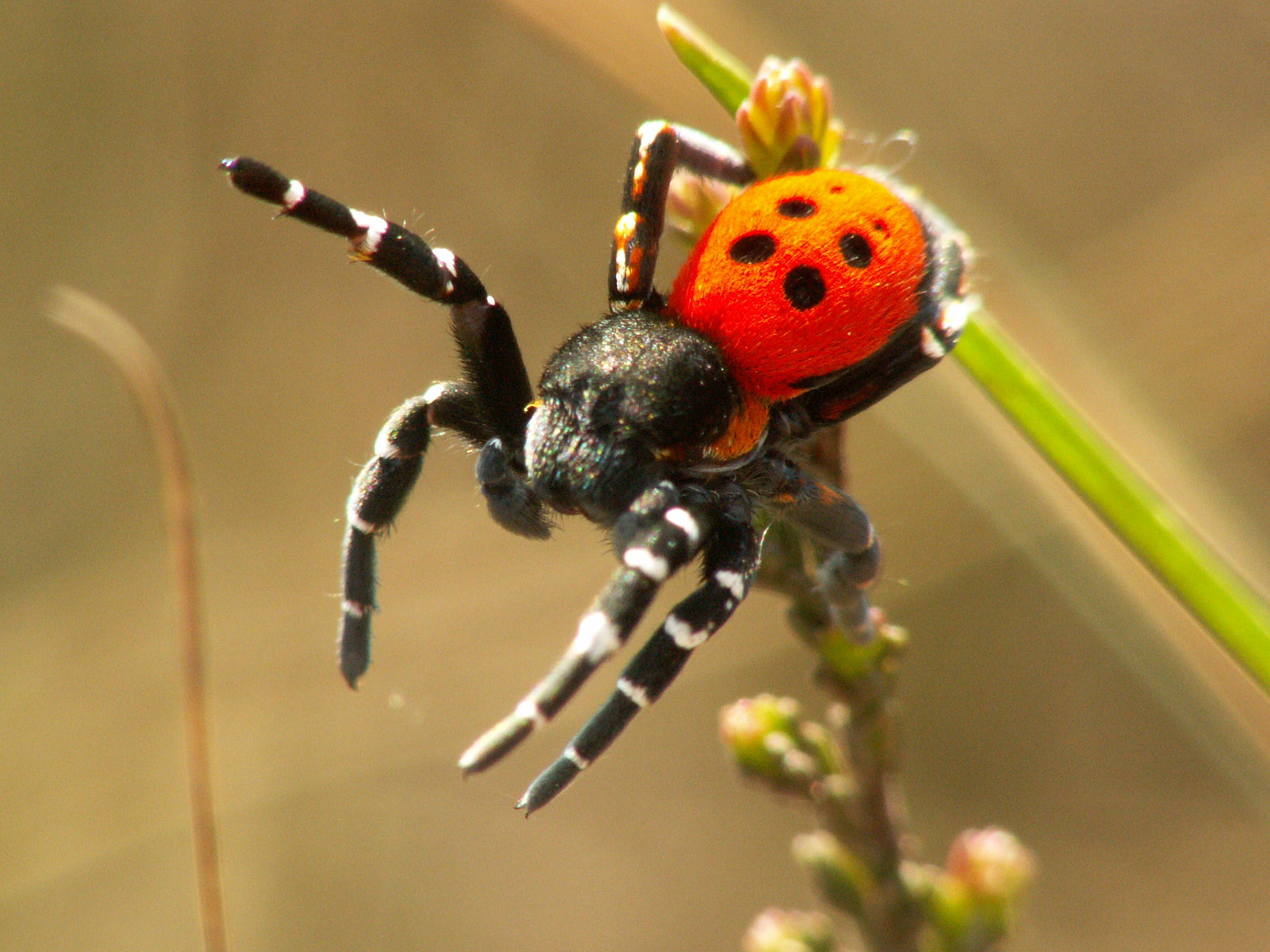
The ladybird spider, Eresus sandaliatus lives on inland shifting dunes, created by forest clearance and overgrazing on poor, sandy soils. Today backhoe loaders can scrape off topsoil, maintaining the low-nutrient soil that such heath and dune species need.

Staatsbosbeheer, the Dutch governmental forest service, considers landscape management an important part of managing their lands. Landschapsbeheer Nederland is an umbrella organisation which promotes and helps fund the interests of the different provincial landscape management organisations, which between them include 75,000 volunteers and 110,000 hectares of protected nature reserves. Sustainable landscape management is being researched in the Netherlands.

=== Peru ===
An example of a producer movement managing a multi-functional landscape is the Potato Park in Písac, Peru, where local communities protect the ecological and cultural diversity of the 12,000ha landscape.

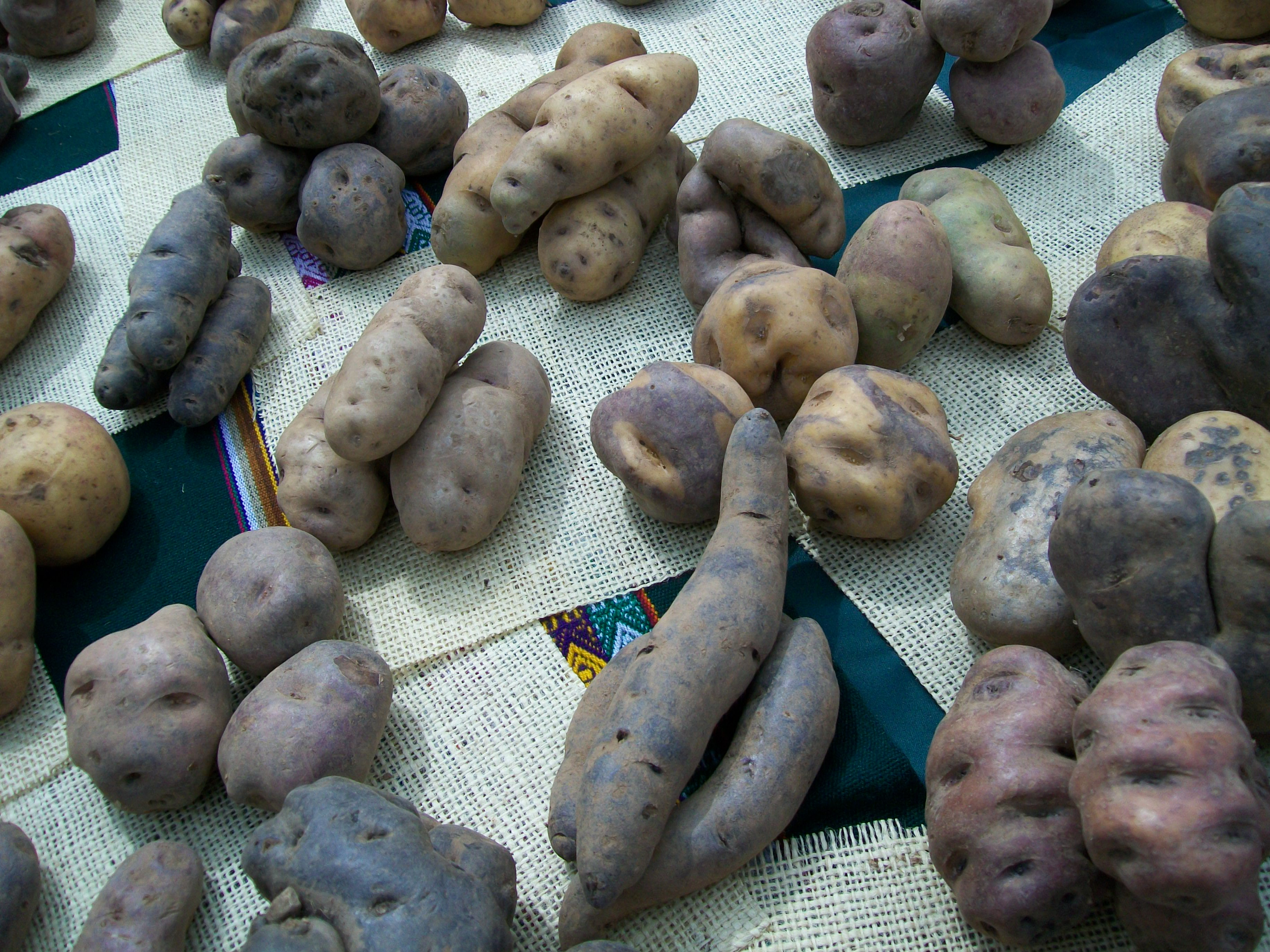
A variety of Peruvian potatoes from the Andes

=== Sweden ===
In Sweden, the Swedish National Heritage Board, or Riksantikvarieämbetet, is responsible for landscape conservation. Landscape conservation can be studied at the Department of Cultural Conservation (at Dacapo Mariestad) of the University of Gothenburg, in both Swedish and English.

=== Thailand ===
An example of cooperation between very different actors is from the Doi Mae Salong watershed in northwest Thailand, a Military Reserved Area under the control of the Royal Thai Armed Forces. Reforestation activities led to tension with local hill tribes. In response, an agreement was reached with them on land rights and use of different parts of the reserve.

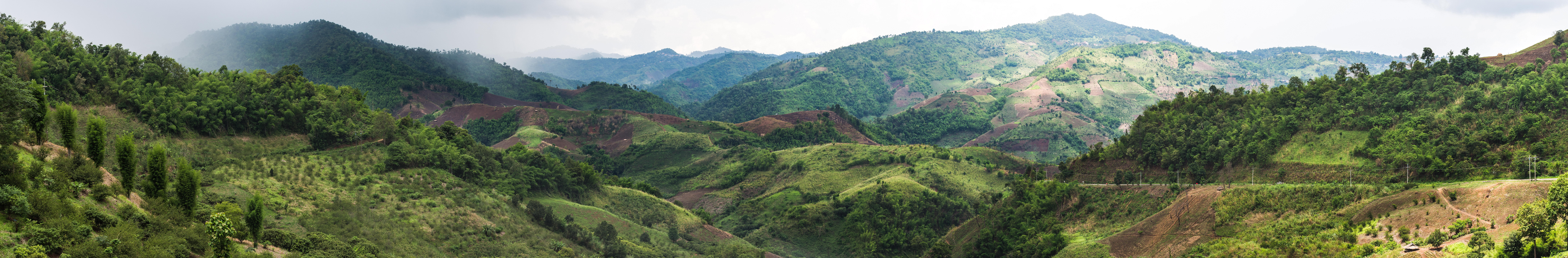
Doi Mae Salong landscape in Thailand is managed by agreement between the army and local hill tribes.

=== United Kingdom ===
Among the leading exponents of UK landscape scale conservation are the Areas of Outstanding Natural Beauty (AONB). There are 49 AONB in the UK. The International Union for Conservation of Nature has categorised these regions as "category 5 protected areas" and in 2005 claimed the AONB are administered using what the IUCN coined the "protected landscape approach". In Scotland there is a similar system of national scenic areas.

The UK Biodiversity Action Plan protects semi-natural grasslands, among other habitats, which constitute landscapes maintained by low-intensity grazing. Agricultural environment schemes reward farmers and land managers financially for maintaining these habitats on registered agricultural land. Each of the four countries in the UK has its own individual scheme.

Studies have been carried out across the UK looking at much wider range of habitats. In Wales the Pumlumon Large Area Conservation Project focusses on upland conservation in areas of marginal agriculture and forestry. The North Somerset Levels and Moors Project addresses wetlands.

=== Other ===
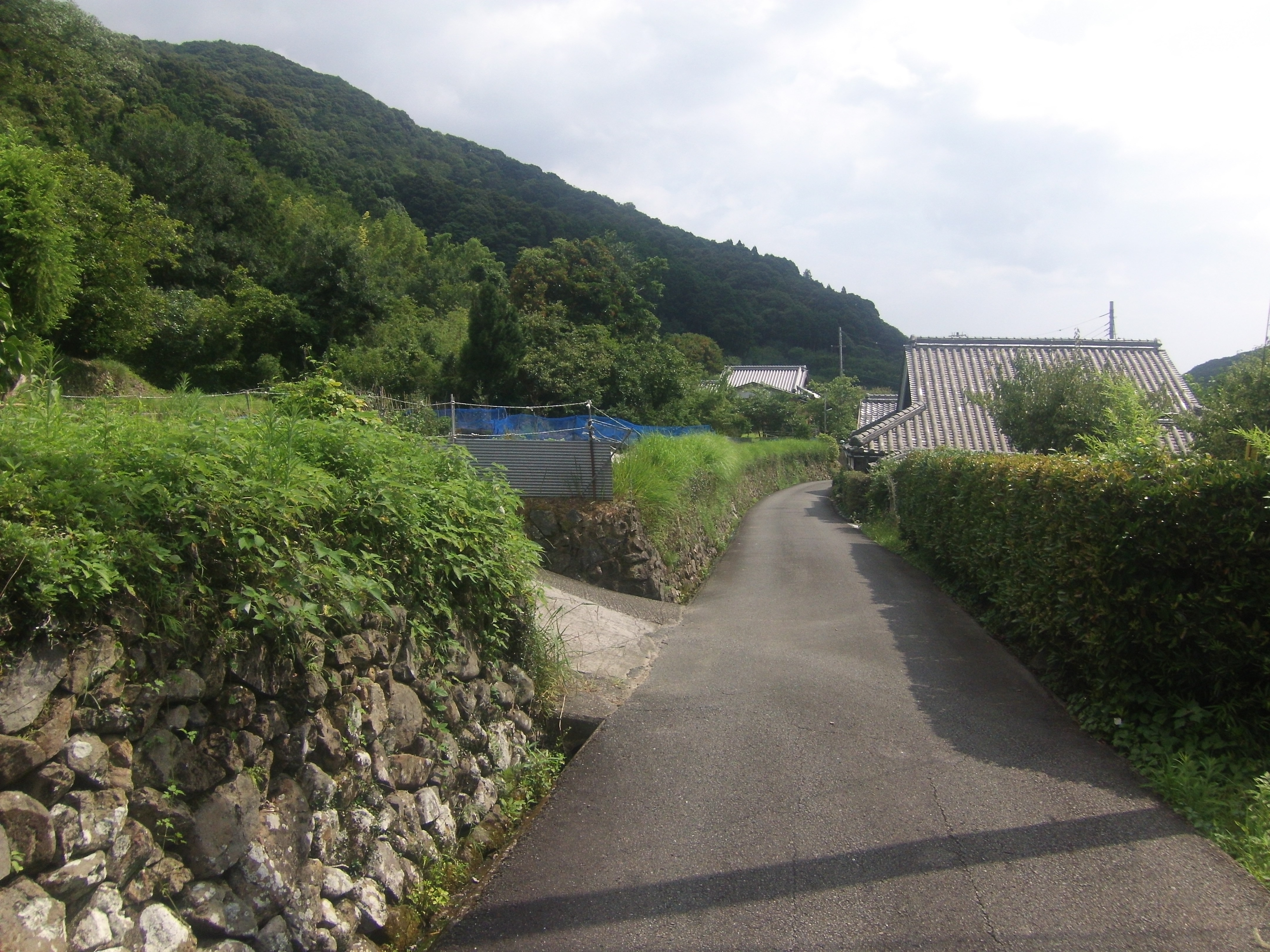
The landscape to the left is known as satoyama; a traditional human-influenced secondary forest bordering agricultural fields in Japan. The satoyama conservation movement spread in the 1980s in Japan and by 2001 there were more than 500 environmental groups involved.

Landscape approaches have been taken up by governments in for example the Greater Mekong Subregion project and in Indonesia's climate change commitments, and by international research bodies such as the Center for International Forestry Research, which convenes the Global Landscapes Forum.

The Mount Kailash region is where the Indus River, the Karnali River (a major tributary of the Ganges River), the Brahmaputra River and the Sutlej river systems originate. With assistance from the International Centre for Integrated Mountain Development, the three surrounding countries (China, India and Nepal) developed an integrated management approach to the different conservation and development issues within this landscape.

Six countries in West Africa in the Volta River basin using the 'Mapping Ecosystems Services to Human well-being' toolkit, use landscape modelling of alternative scenarios for the riparian buffer to make land-use decisions such as conserving hydrological ecosystem services and meeting national SDG commitments.

== Variations ==
=== Ecoagriculture ===
In a 2001 article published by Sara J. Scherr and Jeffrey McNeely, soon expanded into a book, Scherr and McNeely introduced the term "ecoagriculture" to describe their vision of rural development while advancing the environment, claim that agriculture is the dominant influence on wild species and habitats, and point to a number of recent and potential future developments they identified as beneficial examples of land use. They incorporated the non-profit EcoAgriculture Partners. in 2004 to promote this vision, with Scherr as President and CEO, and McNeely as an independent governing board member. Scherr and McNeely edited a second book in 2007. Ecoagriculture had three elements in 2003.

=== Integrated landscape management ===
In 2012 Scherr invented a new term, integrated landscape management(ILM), to describe her ideas for developing entire regions, not at just a farm or plot level. Integrated landscape management is a way of managing sustainable landscapes by bringing together multiple stakeholders with different land use objectives. The integrated approach claims to go beyond other approaches which focus on users of the land independently of each other, despite needing some of the same resources. It is promoted by the conservation NGOs Worldwide Fund for Nature, Global Canopy Programme, The Nature Conservancy, The Sustainable Trade Initiative, and EcoAgriculture Partners. Promoters claim that integrated landscape management will maximise collaboration in planning, policy development and action regarding the interdependent Sustainable Development Goals. It was defined by four elements in 2013:

1. Large scale: It plans land uses at the landscape scale. Wildlife population dynamics and watershed functions can only be understood at the landscape scale. Assuming short-term trade-offs may lead to long-term synergies, conducting analyses over long time periods is advocated.
2. Emphasis on synergies: It tries to exploit "synergies" among conservation, agricultural production, and rural livelihoods.
3. Emphasis on collaboration: It can not be achieved by individuals. The management of landscapes require different land managers with different environmental and socio-economic goals to achieve conservation, production, and livelihood goals at a landscape scale.
4. Importance of both conservation and agricultural production: bringing conservation into the agricultural and rural development discourse by highlighting the importance of ecosystem services in supporting agricultural production. It supports conservationists to more effectively conserve nature within and outside protected areas by working with the agricultural community by developing conservation-friendly livelihoods for rural land users.

By 2016 it had five elements, namely:

1. stakeholders come together for cooperative dialogue and action;
2. they exchange information systematically and discuss perspectives to achieve a shared understanding of the landscape conditions, challenges and opportunities;
3. collaborative planning to develop an agreed action plan;
4. implementation of the plan;
5. monitoring and dialogue to adapt management.

=== Ecosystem approach ===
The ecosystem approach, promoted by the Convention on Biological Diversity, is a strategy for the integrated ecosystem management of land, water, and living resources for conservation and sustainability.

=== Ten Principles ===
This approach includes continual learning and adaptive management: including monitoring, the expectation that actions take place at multiple scales and that landscapes are multifunctional (e.g. supplying both goods, such as timber and food, and services, such as water and biodiversity protection). There are multiple stakeholders, and it assumes they have a common concern about the landscape, negotiate change with each other, and their rights and responsibilities are clear or will become clear.

== Criticisms ==
A literature review identified five main barriers, as follows:

1. Terminology confusion: the variety of definitions creates confusion and resistance to engage. This resistance has emerged, often independently, from different fields. As stated by Scherr et al.: "People are talking about the same thing ... This can lead to fragmentation of knowledge, unnecessary re-invention of ideas and practices, and inability to mobilize action at scale. ... this rich diversity is often simply overwhelming: they receive confusing messages" This problem is not unique to landscape approaches: since the 1970s it has been recognised that the constant emergence of new terminology can be harmful if they promote rhetoric at the expense of action. Because landscapes approaches develop from, and aim to integrate, a wide variety of sectors, makes it vulnerable to overlapping definitions and parallel concepts. Like other approaches to conservation, it may be a fad.
2. Time lags: substantial time and resources are invested in developing and planning, while resources are inadequate for implementation.
3. Operating silos: Each sector pursues its goals without giving consideration to the others. This may arise because of a lack in established objectives, operating norms and funding that effectively bridge different sectors. Working across sectors at the landscape scale requires a range of skills, different from those traditionally used by conservation organisations.
4. Engagement: Stakeholders may not desire to be engaged in the process, engagement may be trivial or inaccessible, and the discussions may hinder efficient decision-making.
5. Monitoring: There is lack of monitoring to check whether the objectives have been achieved.

== See also ==
- Agriculture in Concert with the Environment
- Agroecology
- Agroforestry
- Anthropogenic biome
- Conservation development
- Ecosystem approach
- Global biodiversity
- Landscape ecology
- Multifunctional landscape
- Working landscape
- Landscape Institute
- Landscape urbanism
- Polder model
- Sustainable forest management
- Sustainable landscaping
- Topocide
- Watershed management
