= Working landscape =

Type of landscape

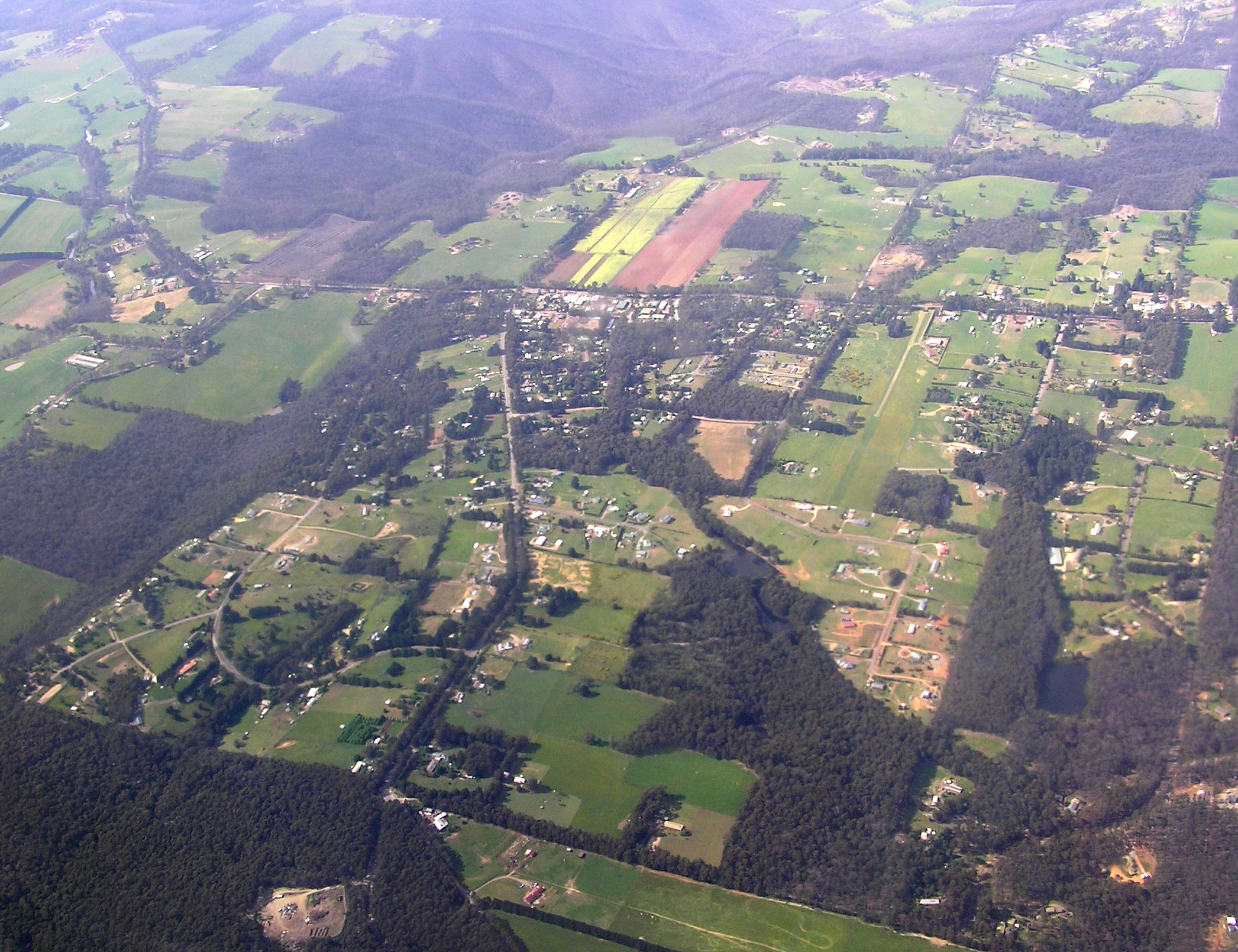
Example of a working landscape in Canada.

Working landscapes are landscapes used for farming, ranching and/or forestry. Recently, these have become the focus of efforts to conserve biodiversity, as these now cover more than 80% of Earth's land, and therefore offer increasing opportunities for conservation and restoration. Though some parts of these landscapes may be used so intensively that they may be unable to sustain native species, working landscapes generally also include significant areas of habitats suitable for native species within their diverse and multifunctional mosaics of intensively used, fallow, and regenerating areas.

== Working landscapes are critical to sustain biodiversity ==
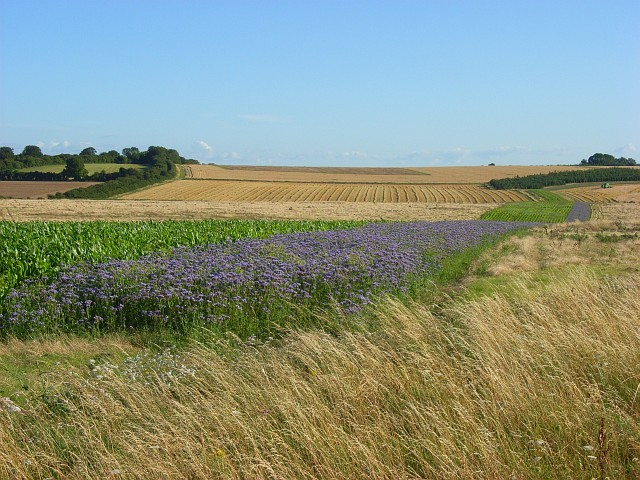
Example of habitat strips for wildlife management in working landscapes in England.

Conventional protected areas can offer high quality habitats with strong protections for native species, but their total global extent will always be limited. As landscapes without human inhabitation and use are already rare and only getting rarer, conservation in working landscapes has become increasingly critical to the future of biodiversity. For example, the conservation of 20% of working landscape area for native habitats has been proposed as a global conservation target, and is only one among many strategies for conservation beyond protected areas that falls under the rubric of Other effective area-based conservation measures. Satellite mapping has been increasingly deployed to monitor how human activities modify working landscapes over time across extensive regions.

== See also ==
- Landscape Ecology
- Land use
- Landscape-scale conservation
- Multifunctional landscape
- Anthropogenic biome
