= Compensatory afforestation =

Forest restoration to compensate for destroyed forests

Compensatory Afforestation
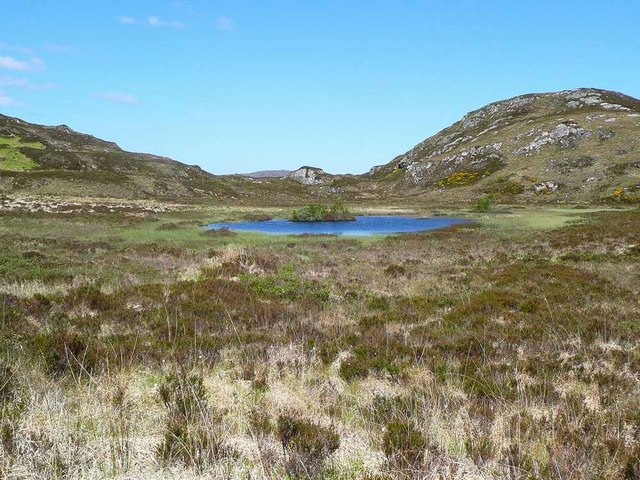
- Compensatory Afforestation, the process of afforestation and the regeneration activities
- Type: Nature
- Synonym: Artificial afforestation
- Organizer: Individual or Organization

Compensatory Afforestation (CA) is defined as the process of afforestation, and associated regeneration activities are done to compensate for destroyed forest land that has been diverted to non-forest activities. In this context, non-forest activities mean the clearing of a forest or just a small part for the following purposes: Coffee cultivation, rubber, tea, plants with oil, medicinal plants or gardening crops. This may be for the purpose of personal use or for business use—or any other purpose other than the reforestation of the forest.

Even though the forests are cut down, this process of Compensatory Afforestation ensures that the forest is still put into good use.

Compensatory afforestation is also a means of creating non-forest land-use replacements. Non-forest purposes include the activities, for example, cultivation or redevelopment in an area that had forests previously. Mostly, Compensatory afforestation is mainly carried out for the purpose of agriculture or any other activity other than industrial use on the piece of land. Compensatory Afforestation is not applied to activities of management of the wildlife, development activities, conservation of the environment and management of the forest, for example, fencing, construction of bridges, and channels construction. The organization that is backing the project is the one that incurs all the cost of compensating a forest.

== Countries and Regions ==
=== America ===
America's forest cover as of 2010 was 304.022 million hectares, which represents 33% of the country's geographical land Between 1990 and 2010, America was losing 384,350 hectares of forest cover annually. This resulted to the establishment of programs like Forest Service Reforestation, Stewardships Incentives Program, and the Forestry Incentives Program which were tasked with the responsibilities of overseeing the creation of new forests to help replace those wasted for industrial and human settlement purposes. Further, the US Code, Title 16, Chapter 2 of National Forests calls for the establishment of new National Forests by the American Forest Service to help minimize the impacts of deforestation due to human activities. Some other acts include the 1973 Endangered Species Act and the Clean Water Act.

=== Australia ===
Before British settlement in Australia in 1788, forests covered 9% of the entire country and they were further destroyed by human activities like farming, grazing, and human activities such as human settlement. In Australia, afforestation endeavours are conducted by the National Tree Program in conjunction with the National Coordination Committee, which was created in 1987. The endeavours of the former include supplying seedlings to members of society to create forests in society. The committee compensates landowners which resulted in the planting of 15.9 million trees in Australia. Some other initiatives include the One Billion Trees Program as well as the Save the Bush Program which oversees the creation of forests in the nation.

=== China ===
The forest area in China is 175 million hectares, and annual timber accumulation is 12.5 billion cubic meters; the World Bank ranks China as the fifth country when it comes to forest-deficiency. However, the government has put in place measures for compensatory afforestation to meet the tremendous economic growth characterized by vast industrialization. In 1999 there was a compensation afforestation scheme in Shanxi, Gansu, and Sichuan where 14 million hectares were planted to compensate for the cultivated forests and human settlements. In 2000, the State Council approved the project of Six National Key Forest; the subject of Natural Forest Protection, the Desertification and Dust Storms Control Program, the project of Sloping Land Conversion, the Forest Shelterbelt Development Program, and the subject of Wildlife Conservation and Nature Reserves Development. Moreover, in 2018 China's State Forestry Administration head Zhang Jianlong announced that China would grow 6.6 million hectares with most of them being in the Xiongan Development Zone and Hebei to help counter for the forests destroyed for industrial growth and human settlement.

=== India ===
In the year 2012, the Supreme Court of India stated the misuse of money that is being composed for afforestation and the method in which funds are not being completely used for their purpose. In relation to the failure of the way the funds are being used misappropriate, Indian High Court gave an order for the creation of a better pool of funds and therefore, a new organization called the Compensatory Afforestation Management and Planning Authority (CAMPA) was established. The offices of the state can got 10% funds from National CAMPA for the conservation of forests and the purpose of afforestation. But as the funds that the offices received was still misappropriate used, the CAMPA act was implemented by the Indian government in the year 2015 to monitor and regulate how the funds are being used. CAMPA act, refers to a notice in the Indian legislation whose main aim is to provide appropriate mechanism that is institutional, at the center and in every Union and State Territory, so as to ensure that there is proper utilization in transparent and efficient amounts of manner that has been put in lands in the forest diverted to land that is used for non-forest use. By the year 2019, offices had been started to be set up of the National CAMPA oversees proper utilization of funds. But some scholars still argue that some part of the fund needs to be paid to the aboriginals of the area.

=== U.K. ===
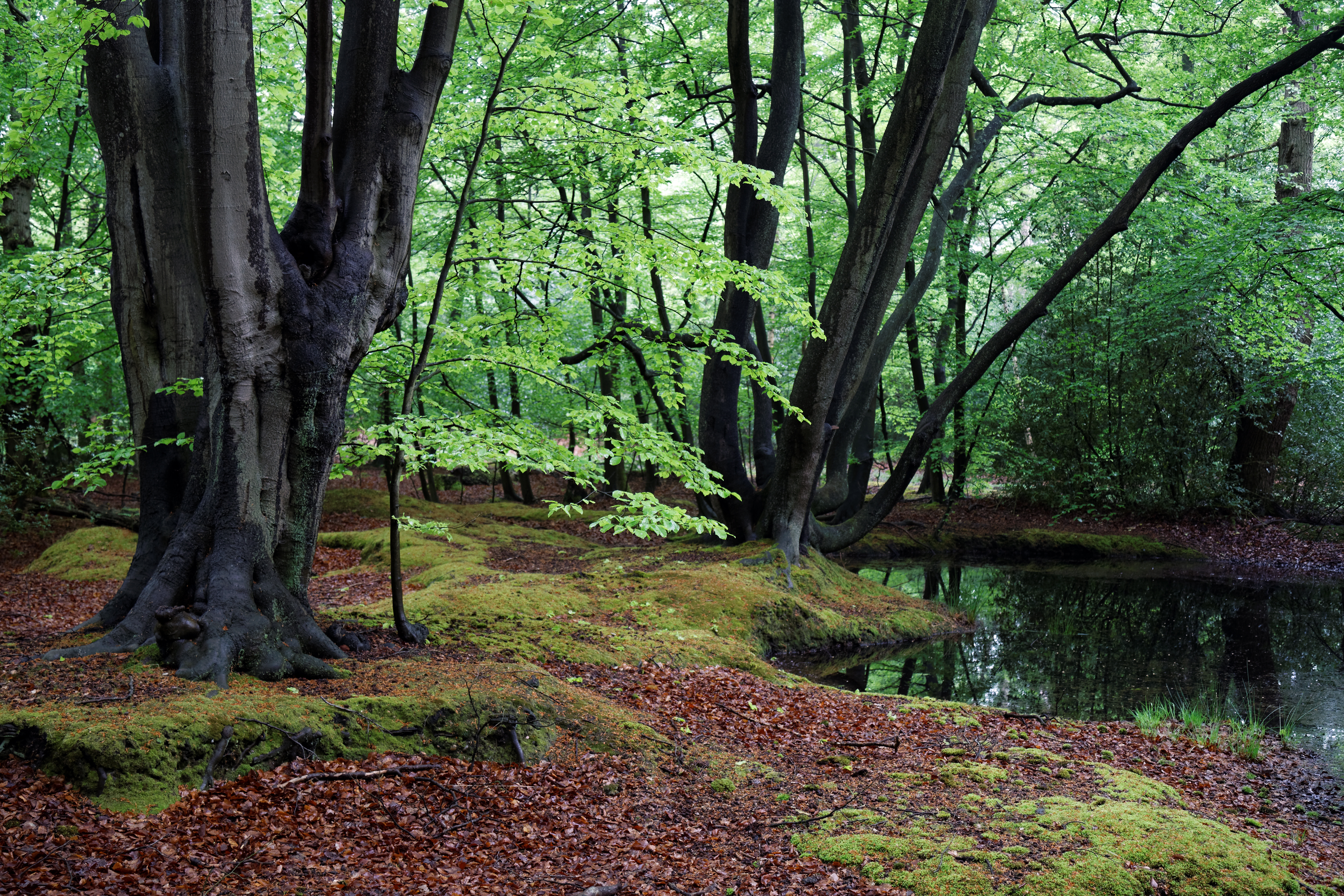
Forest in England

The effects of vast human urbanization characterized by industrial growth resulted to reduction of forest cover by approximately 4% resulting to the creation of the Forestry Act legislated in 1951 which required wood owners to obtain licenses before cutting down trees. In 1988, the Woodland Grant Scheme was introduced to oversee the creation of new forests and resulted to the establishment of 700 hectares in the U.K. In fact, in 2018, the government announced that it would create new forests in various places like the Liverpool and the city of Hull.

== Progress ==
According to Global Forest Watch, the forest cover created due to compensatory afforestation globally since 2001 to 2018 increased by 5.4%. Apparently, compensatory afforestation arose as a result of vast deforestation rates in various parts of the world. Precisely, it began in India in 1980 through the Forest Conservation Act which required the acquisition of forest land and the requirement for compensatory afforestation as per the government's requirements. This was later revolutionized by the adoption of the net present value concept for the forests from 2002 since the Supreme Court in India believe that compensatory afforestation was not fully sufficient to substitute for the natural forests destroyed. This resulted to the formation of the National Compensatory Afforestation Fund Management and Planning Authority; abbreviated CAMPA, to administer the fund of compensatory afforestation. Further, the Compensatory Afforestation Fund Rules of 2018 further streamlined the operations of the policy.

Initiated in China in 1999 in Shaanxi, Gansu, and Sichuan, the compensatory afforestation scheme has so far resulted to the appreciation of forest coverage by 23%. Between 2012 and 2016, around 33.8 million hectares of artificial forest was planted with most of it being a part of compensatory afforestation endeavours in the country. This is in conjunction with the ecological red line endeavour which restricts human activities in forests and calls for replacing the depleted ones. In the U.K, the Woodland Grant Scheme of 1988 later evolved to a compensatory afforestation scheme and accounts for 14.6% of the forests in the country. This is implemented by the FCA which is a government agency. In Australia, compensatory afforestation has been strict since before the adoption of the policy, there was massive destruction of forests which covered as much as 30% of natural forests. Ultimately, compensatory afforestation policies have evolved to better reforms over the years to become valuable contributors to the development of new forests and climate change. These are social enterprises which will benefit the community and even the continent in the long run.

== Impacts ==
=== Positive Impact ===
Compensatory afforestation have contributed to the creation of 10% of the world's forests. It encourages and promotes the creation of new forests which helps in improving the climate of different locations since trees absorb carbon dioxide and help in completing the horologic cycle. In addition, it also helps in transforming of organic carbon in the soil and the associated soil properties which affects ecosystem function and plant diversity.

=== Negative Impact ===
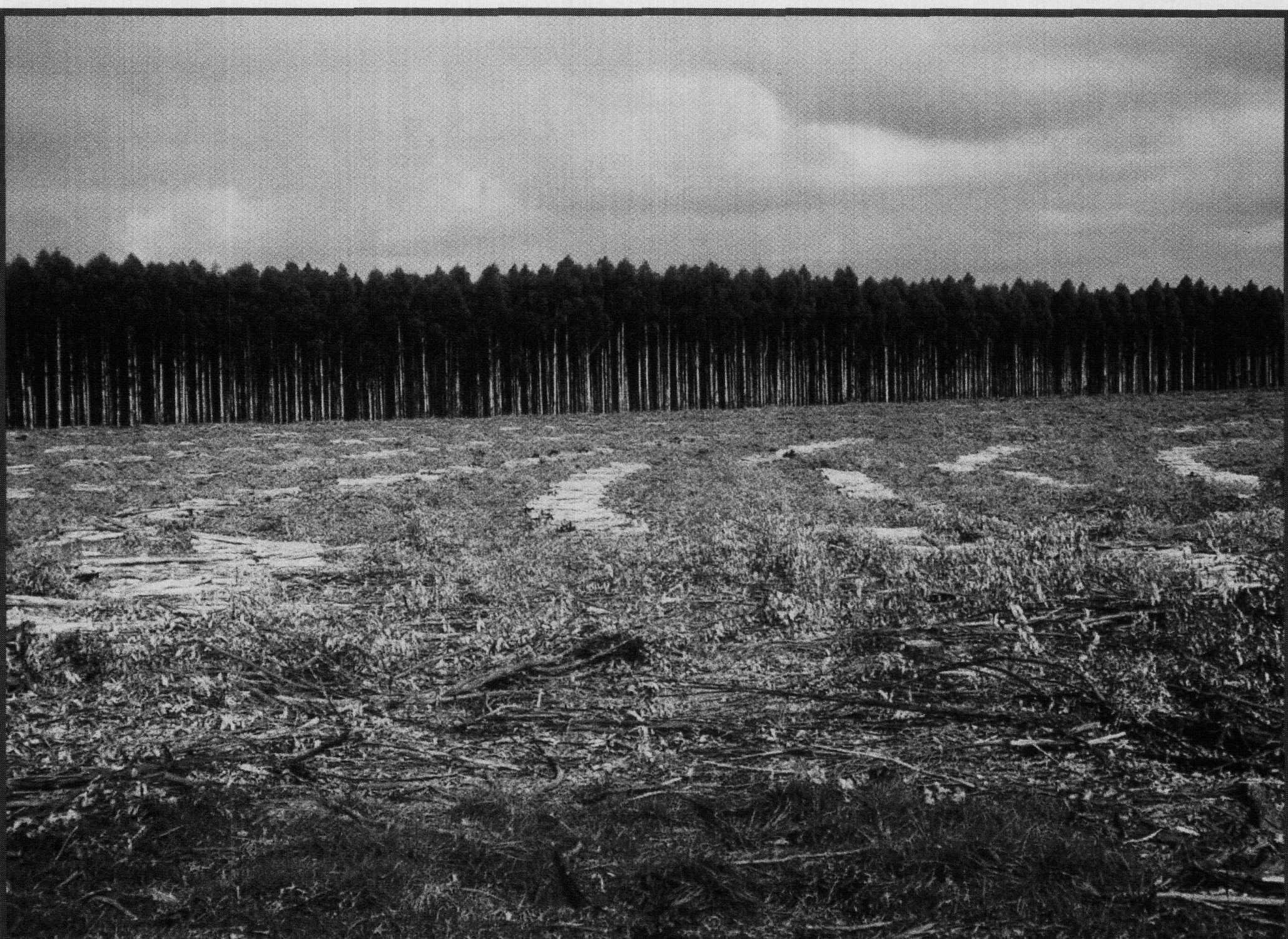
Afforestation Issue

The implementation of compensatory afforestation may result in the destruction of natural forests which may interfere with the ecosystem of the location. Because it advocates deforestation then the creation of entirely new forests. Notably, compensatory afforestation does not inhibit human activities on forests but rather creates room for them and calls for the planting of new ones. This has adverse impacts on the flora and fauna since natural forests present more benefits in terms of diversity compared to the artificial ones. Further, due to corruption, a report released in 2018 showed that CAMPA violates the Forest Conservation Act by allowing forests to be cleared and later grown by the same investors in the same location. This promotes wood-logging and destruction of natural habitats. For instance, in India compensatory afforestation has been blamed for presenting opportunities for the destruction of forests by established corporations yet the compensation is not equitable to the forests destroyed. Undoubtedly, the legitimization of forests destruction and encroaching of community owned lands can be attributed to compensatory afforestation. Destruction of a forest in a given location especially in towns results to more carbon dioxide in the atmosphere which affects air quality.

== Implementation ==
Most of the funds that had been set aside for the purpose of compensatory afforestation has remained to be unused because of issues that have arisen between states over how the funds should be used. Because of the conflict, the funds have remained to be unused and frozen for even a longer period until a solution has been met. Also, the states have delayed collecting the funds hence contributing to the misappropriation of the funds that has been set aside for compensatory afforestation.

In India, there is need for strict implementation of the reform due to complaints by most individuals that CAMPA does not follow up to ensure that the destroyed forests are not wholly compensated. The High Court in India in the year 2000, ruled out on details that surrounded the good process of CA by the Ministry. Also, the High Court gave an order to the Ministry for leading the matter that delivers for description regarding errands in the period of the funding of the clearance of forests. In the year 2012, the high law court made a directory creating the Compensatory funds acknowledged by the supports is directed to CA. CA Fund Management and Planning Authority was therefore instructed by the Environment and forests ministry. In the year 2009, the High Court gave a mandatory that the CAMPA would be getting an advisory in the assembly under control of the Ministry.

== Efficiency of the compensatory afforestation guidelines in India ==
The Act 1980 regarding the forest expects that afforestation is done while compensating the forest land that has been taken for uses of non-forest activities. In the year 2007, the environment ministry overseeing Forest and Climate Change. They gave out rules that specifically laid out the measures for identification together with the sustainability of land that has been set aside for the purpose of Afforestation compensation.

The guidelines from MoEF (Ministry of Environment, Forest) states that if the land that has been set aside and proposed as a place where forests can be relocated and contains some vegetation or density that is substantial, the arrangement will not be properly balanced because there is inadequate space for plant the required plants in the zone that has been suggested. Instead of declining the application, by the overseers and the project managers, the Environment and Forests Ministry gives a suggestion that one thousand plants can be planted per hectare in a land that does not have any forest. The Environment and Forest Ministry further state that the one thousand plants can be carried over to the next land if the plants cannot be able to fit in the one hectare that has been set aside.
