= Anthropogenic biome =

Human-altered ecosystems

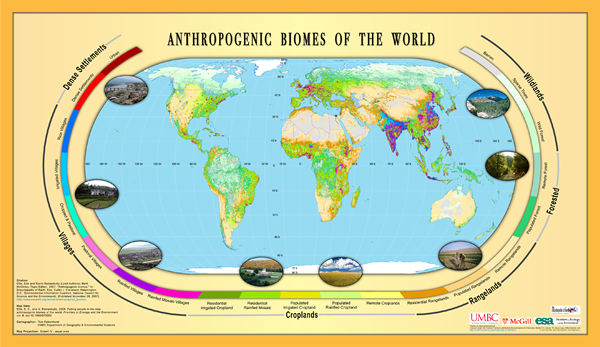
Anthropogenic biomes (v1 from Ellis & Ramankutty (2008))

Anthropogenic biomes, also known as anthromes, human biomes or intensive land-use biomes, describe the terrestrial biosphere in its contemporary, human-altered form using global ecosystem units (biomes) defined by global patterns of sustained direct human interaction with ecosystems. Anthromes are generally composed of heterogeneous mosaics of different land uses and land covers, including significant areas of fallow or regenerating habitats.

== Origin and evolution of the concept ==
Anthromes were first named and mapped by Erle Ellis and Navin Ramankutty in their 2008 paper, "Putting People in the Map: Anthropogenic Biomes of the World". Anthrome maps now appear in numerous textbooks. and in the National Geographic World Atlas. The most recent version of anthrome maps were published in 2021.

In a recent global ecosystem classification, anthropogenic biomes have been incorporated into several distinct functional biomes in the terrestrial and freshwater realms, and additional units have been described for the freshwater, marine, subterranean and transitional realms to create a more comprehensive description of all ecosystems created and maintained by human activities. The intensive land-use biome comprises five distinct terrestrial ecosystem functional groups: pastures, crops, plantations, urban and semi-natural ecosystem functional group. The artificial wetlands biome in the freshwater realm includes large reservoirs and other constructed wetlands, rice paddies, aquafarms and networks of canals and ditches. The anthropogenic marine biome in the marine realm includes submerged artificial structures and marine aquafarms. The anthropogenic subterranean voids biome includes industrial excavations or artificial cave-like systems. There are two additional biomes in transitions between realms: the anthropogenic shoreline biome includes artificial shorelines; the anthropogenic subterranean freshwaters biome includes water pipes, subterranean canals and flooded mines.

== Anthropogenic transformation of the biosphere ==
For more than a century, the biosphere has been described in terms of global ecosystem units called biomes, which are vegetation types like tropical rainforests and grasslands that are identified in relation to global climate patterns. Considering that human populations and their use of land have fundamentally altered global patterns of ecosystem form, process, and biodiversity, anthropogenic biomes provide a framework for integrating human systems with the biosphere in the Anthropocene.

=== Before 1700 ===
Humans have been altering ecosystems since we have evolved. Evidence suggests that our ancestors were burning land to clear it one million years ago. 600,000 years ago, humans were using spears to kill horses and other large animals in Great Britain and China. For the past tens of thousands of years, humans have greatly changed the plant and animal life around the globe, from what type of wildlife and plant life dominated to what type of ecosystems dominate. Examples include Native Americans; they altered the forest, burnt land to clear it, settled in cities, disrupting forests and other ecosystems, and built monuments that required moving large amounts of earth, such as the Cahokia Monuments. More examples are the civilizations of the ancient world; they mined large amounts of material, made roads, and especially for the Romans, when mining lead, released large amounts of mercury and lead into the air. A recent study showed that nearly three quarters of Earth's land was already inhabited and reshaped by human societies as long as 12,000 years ago.

=== Agriculture (1700–present) ===
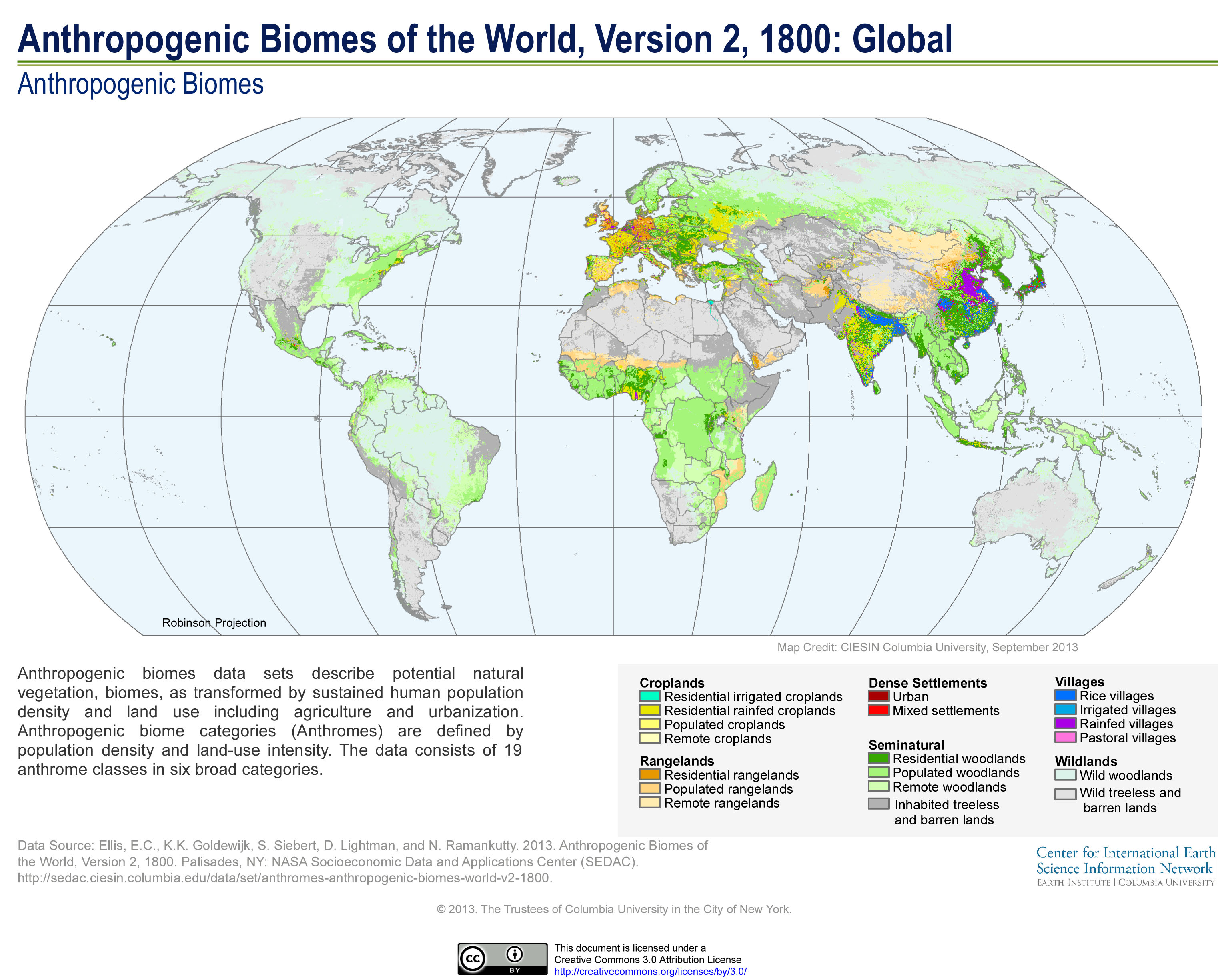
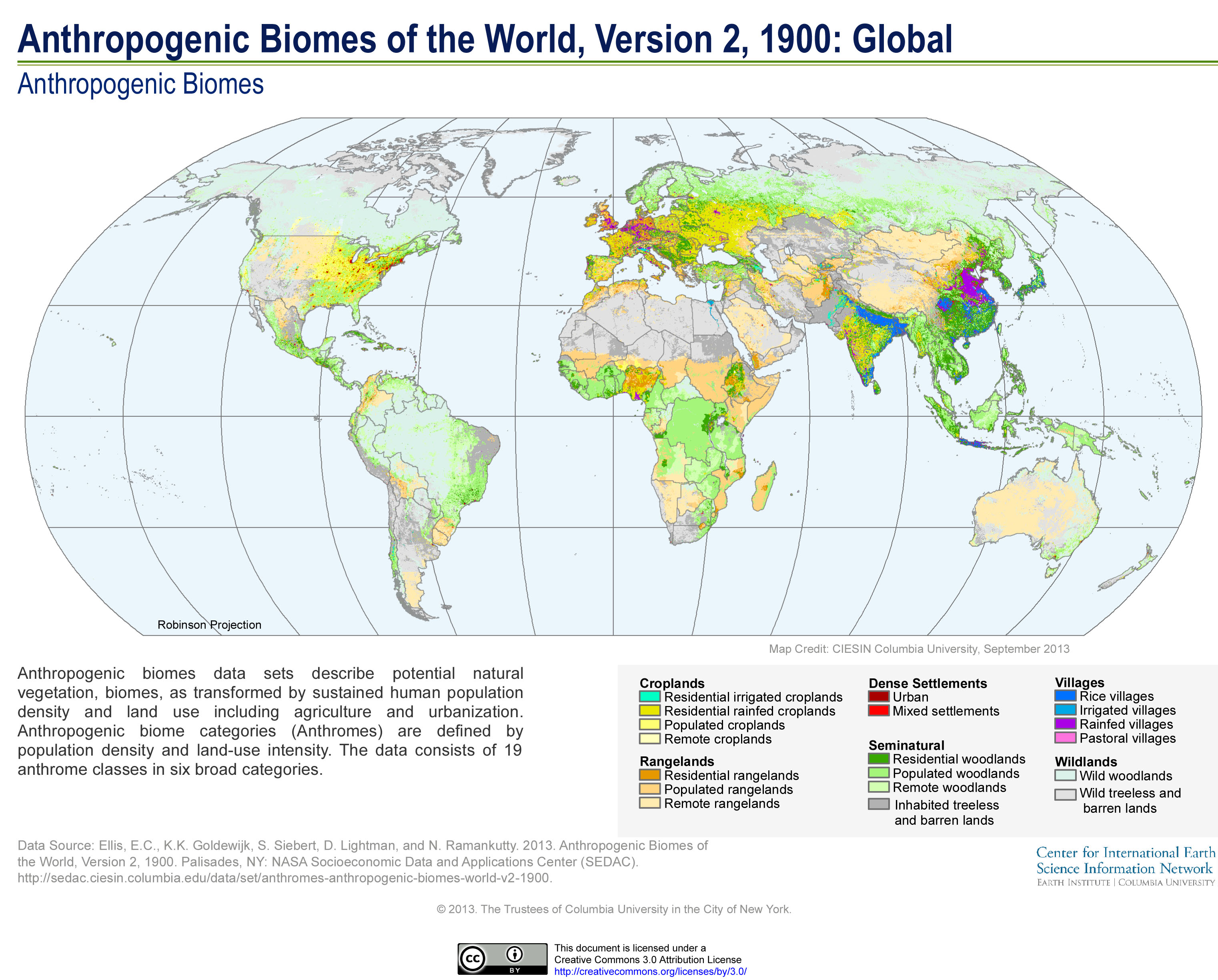
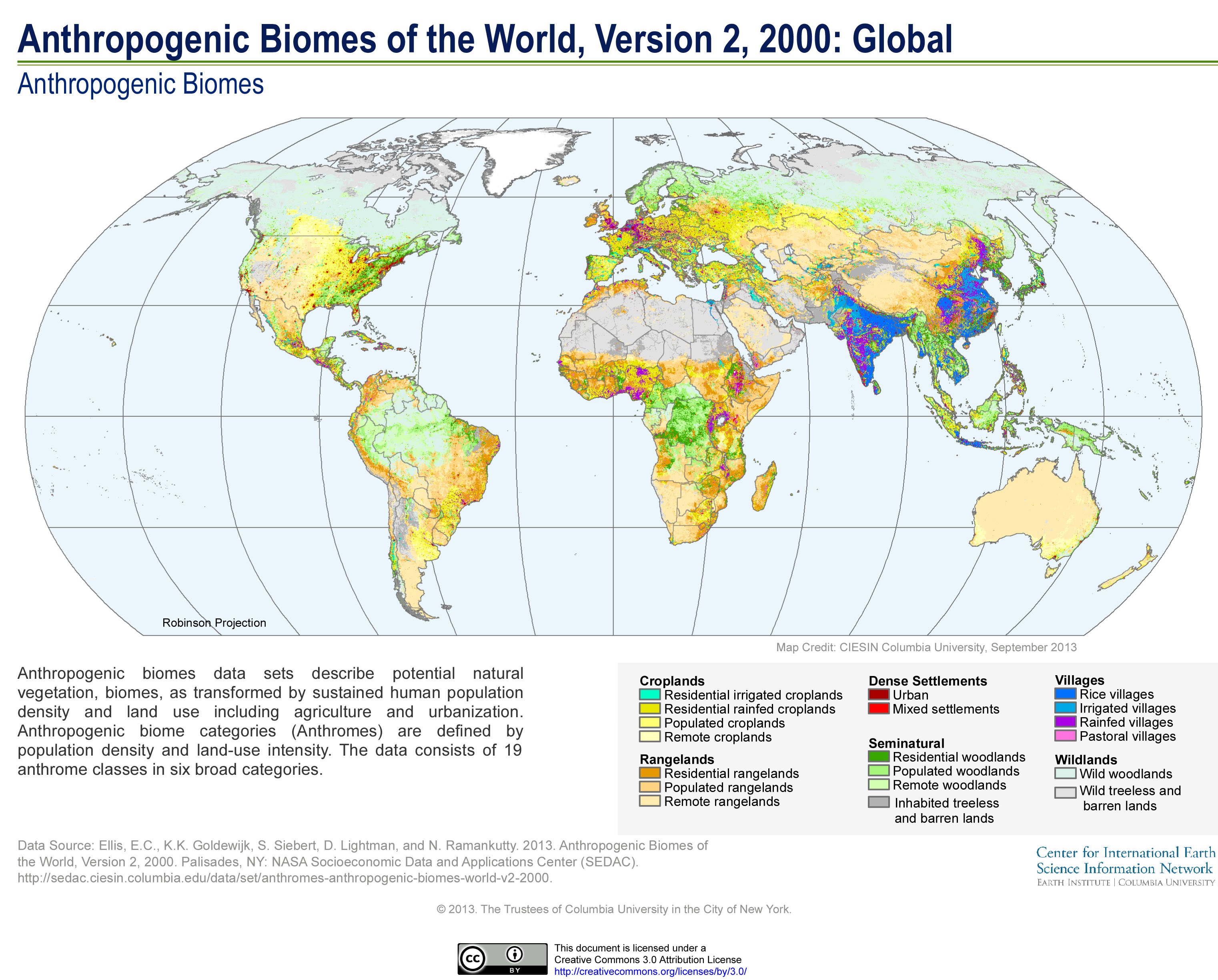
Anthropogenic biomes have grown dramatically in the past few centuries.

Humans have been altering ecosystems since before agriculture first developed, and as the human population has grown and become more technologically advanced over time, the land use for agricultural purposes has increased significantly. The anthropogenic biome in the 1700s, before the industrial revolution, was made up of mostly wild, untouched land, with no human settlement disturbing the natural state. In this time period, most of the Earth's ice-free land consisted of wildlands and natural anthromes, and it wasn't until after the industrial revolution in the 19th century that land use for agriculture and human settlements started to increase. With technology advancing and manufacturing processes becoming more efficient, the human population was beginning to thrive, and was subsequently requiring and using more natural resources. By the year 2000, over half of the Earth's ice free land was transformed into rangelands, croplands, villages and dense settlements, which left less than half of the Earth's land untouched. Anthropogenic changes between 1700 and 1800 were far smaller than those of the following centuries, and as such the rate of change has increased over time. As a result, the 20th century had the fastest rate of anthropogenic ecosystem transformation of the past 300 years.

=== Land distribution ===
As the human population steadily increased in numbers throughout history, the use of natural resources and land began to increase, and the distribution of land used for various agricultural and settlement purposes began to change. The use of land around the world was transformed from its natural state to land used for agriculture, settlements and pastures to sustain the population and its growing needs. The distribution of land among anthromes underwent a shift away from natural anthromes and wildlands towards human-altered anthromes we are familiar with today. Now, the most populated anthromes (dense settlements and villages) account for only a small fraction of the global ice-free land. From the year 1700–2000, lands used for agriculture and urban settlements increased significantly, however the area occupied by rangelands increased even more rapidly, so that it became the dominant anthrome in the 20th century. As a result, the biggest global land-use change as a result of the industrial revolution, was the expansion of pastures.

=== Human population ===
Following the industrial revolution, the human population experienced a rapid increase. The human population density in certain anthromes began to change, shifting away from rural environments to urban settlements, where the population density was much higher. These changes in population density between areas shifted global patterns of anthrome emergence, and also had wide-spread effects on various ecosystems. Half of the Earth's population now lives in cities, and most people reside in urban anthromes, with some populations dwelling in smaller cities and towns. Currently, human populations are expected to grow until at least midcentury, and the transformation of the Earth's anthromes are expected to follow this growth.

=== Current state of the anthropogenic biosphere ===
The present state of the terrestrial biosphere is predominantly anthropogenic. More than half of the terrestrial biosphere remains unused directly for agriculture or urban settlements, and of these unused lands still remaining, less than half are wildlands. Most of Earth's unused lands are now within the agricultural and settled landscapes of semi-natural, rangeland, cropland and village anthromes.

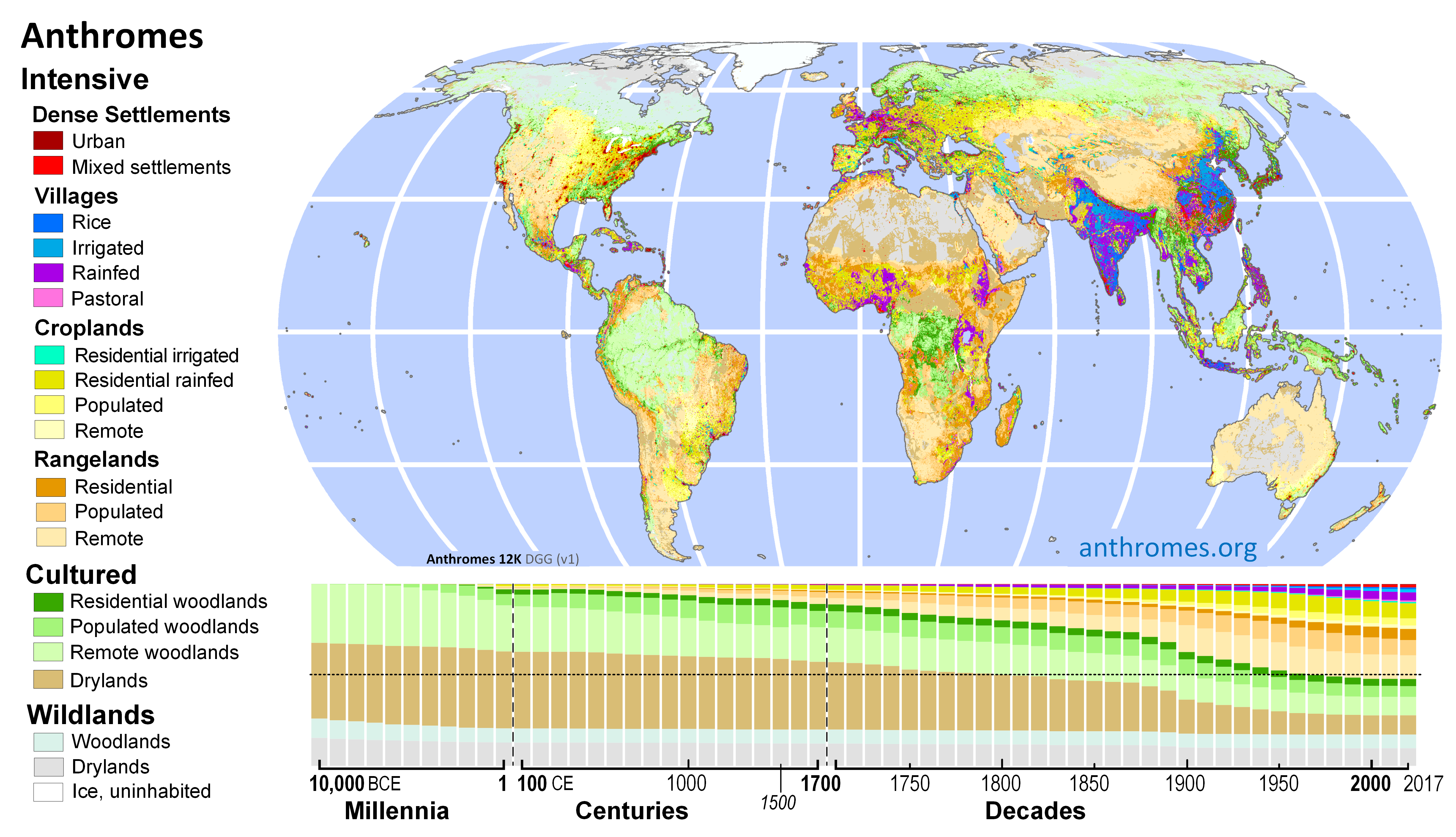
Anthromes map for 2017 with timeline of anthrome changes from 10,000 BCE to 2017 CE. From Ellis et al. (2021)

=== Major anthromes ===
Anthromes include dense settlements (urban and mixed settlements), villages, croplands, rangelands and semi-natural lands and have been mapped globally using two different classification systems, viewable on Google Maps and Google Earth. There are currently 18 anthropogenic biomes, the most prominent of which are listed below.

==== Dense settlements ====
Dense settlements are the second most densely populated regions in the world. They are defined as areas with a high population density, though the density can be variable. The population density, however, never falls below 100 persons/km, even in the non-urban parts of the dense settlements, and it has been suggested that these areas consist of both the edges of major cities in underdeveloped nations, and the long standing small towns throughout western Europe and Asia. Most often we think of dense settlements as cities, but dense settlements can also be suburbs, towns and rural settlements with high but fragmented populations.

==== Villages ====
Villages are densely populated agricultural landscapes, many of which have been inhabited and intensively used for centuries to millennia.

==== Croplands ====
Croplands are another major anthrome throughout the world. Croplands include most of the cultivated lands of the world, and also about a quarter of global tree cover. Croplands which are locally irrigated have the highest human population density, likely due to the fact that it provides crops with a constant supply on water. This makes harvest time and crop survival more predictable. Croplands that are sustained mainly from the local rainfall are the most extensive of the populated anthromes, with annual precipitation near 1000 mm in certain areas of the globe. In these areas, there is sufficient water supplied by the climate to support all aspects of life without hardly any irrigation. However, in dryer areas, this method of agriculture would not be as productive.

==== Rangelands ====
Rangelands are a very broad anthropogenic biome group that has been described according to three levels of population density: residential, populated and remote. The Residential rangeland anthrome has two key features: its population density is never below 10 persons per square kilometre, and a substantial portion of its area is used for pasture. Pastures in rangelands are the most dominant land cover. Bare earth is significant in this anthrome, covering nearly one third of the land for every one square kilometer. Rangeland anthromes are less altered than croplands, but their alteration tends to increase with population. Domesticated grazing livestock are typically adapted to grasslands and savannas, so the alteration of these biomes tends to be less noticeable.

==== Cultured lands ====
Cultured anthromes are landscapes shaped by low levels of intensive land use and substantial to very low density populations. The Cultured anthrome classification was introduced in 2021 to replace analogous classifications, "Seminatural" (2010 classification) and "Forested" (original 2008 classification). Cultured woodland anthromes are woodland biomes shaped by land use and human inhabitation, and their population densities are usually less than 3 persons/km^{2}. Many cultured woodlands are secondary forests that act as carbon sinks as a result of ongoing regrowth of woody vegetation. Some cultured woodlands are partially cleared for agriculture, including domestic livestock, and to utilize timber. Cultured dryland anthromes are dryland biomes shaped by land use and human inhabitation.

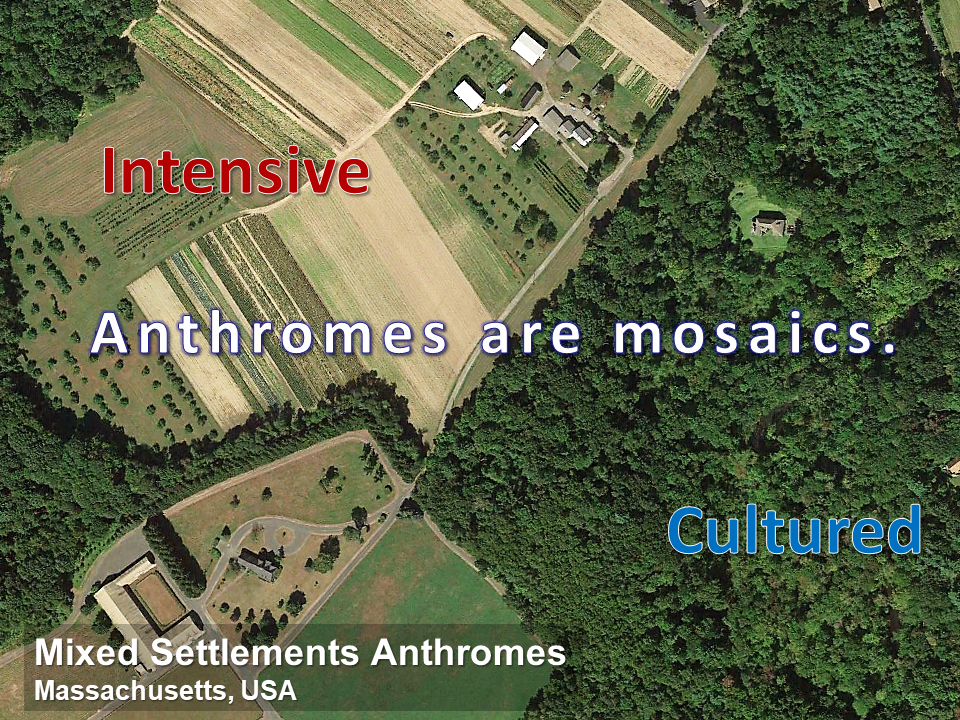
Anthromes are mosaics of intensively used and cultured lands

==== Indoor ====
Very few biologists have studied the evolutionary processes at work in indoor environments. Estimates of the extent of residential and commercial buildings range between 1.3% and 6% of global ice-free land area. This area is as extensive as other small biomes such as flooded grass-lands and tropical coniferous forests. The indoor biome is rapidly expanding. The indoor biome of Manhattan is almost three times as large, in terms of its floor space, as is the geographical area of the island itself, due to the buildings rising up instead of spreading out. Thousands of species live in the indoor biome, many of them preferentially or even obligatorily. The only action that humans take to alter the evolution of the indoor biome is with cleaning practices. The field of indoor biomes will continue to change as long as our culture will change.

==== Aquatic ====
Managed aquatic biomes or aquatic anthromes have rarely been studied as such. They range from fish ponds, marine shrimp and benthic farming sites to large tracts of land such as parts of the Guadalquivir Marshes in Andalusia, Spain.

=== Implications of an anthropogenic biosphere ===
Humans have fundamentally altered global patterns of biodiversity and ecosystem processes. It is no longer possible to explain or predict ecological patterns or processes across the Earth without considering the human role. Human societies began transforming terrestrial ecology more than 50 000 years ago, and evolutionary evidence has been presented demonstrating that the ultimate causes of human transformation of the biosphere are social and cultural, not biological, chemical, or physical. Anthropogenic biomes offer a new way forward by acknowledging human influence on global ecosystems and moving us toward models and investigations of the terrestrial biosphere that integrate human and ecological systems.

=== Challenges facing biodiversity in the anthropogenic biosphere ===
==== Extinctions ====
Over the past century, anthrome extent and land use intensity increased rapidly together with growing human populations, leaving wildlands without human population or land use in less than one quarter of the terrestrial biosphere. This massive transformation of Earth's ecosystems for human use has occurred with enhanced rates of species extinctions. Humans are directly causing species extinctions, especially of megafauna, by reducing, fragmenting and transforming native habitats and by overexploiting individual species. Current rates of extinctions vary greatly by taxa, with mammals, reptiles and amphibians especially threatened; however there is growing evidence that viable populations of many, if not most native taxa, especially plants, may be sustainable within anthromes. With the exception of especially vulnerable taxa, the majority of native species may be capable of maintaining viable populations in anthromes.

==== Conservation ====
Anthromes present an alternative view of the terrestrial biosphere by characterizing the diversity of global ecological land cover patterns created and sustained by human population densities and land use while also incorporating their relationships with biotic communities. Biomes and ecoregions are limited in that they reduce human influences, and an increasing number of conservation biologists have argued that biodiversity conservation must be extended to habitats directly shaped by humans. Within anthromes, including densely populated anthromes, humans rarely use all available land. As a result, anthromes are generally mosaics of heavily used lands and less intensively used lands. Protected areas and biodiversity hotspots are not distributed equally across anthromes. Less populated anthromes contain a greater proportion of protected areas. While 23.4% of remote woodland anthrome is protected, only 2.3% of irrigated village anthrome is protected. There is increasing evidence that suggests that biodiversity conservation can be effective in both densely and sparsely settled anthromes. A combination of land sharing and land sparing in working landscapes and multifunctional landscapes are increasingly popular as conservation strategies.

== See also ==
- Landscape ecology
- Landscape-scale conservation
- Novel ecosystem
- Agroecology
- Technoecosystem
- Technodiversity
