= Crisis ecoregion =

A crisis ecoregion is a terrestrial biome facing significant threat to its biodiversity and requiring well directed conservation efforts in order to curb the irreversible loss of plant and animal species and their surrounding habitats. Generally, an ecoregion is understood to be an area of particular ecological importance because of diminishing habitats and ecosystems, but a crisis ecoregion is one that is particularly vulnerable and is listed as 'critical' because of a high Conservation Risk Index (CRI).

== See also ==
- Biodiversity
- Conservation biology
- Ecology
- Ecoregions
- Protected Areas
