= John Ena Jr. =

Hawaiian business magnate and politician (1845–1906)

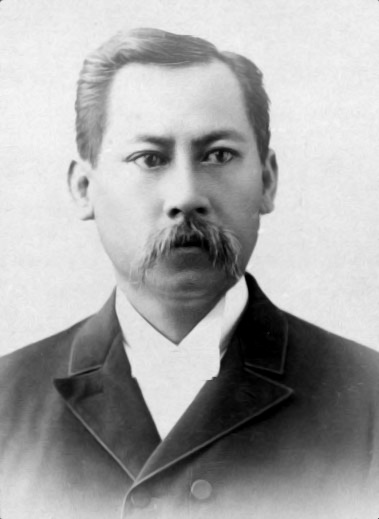

Member of the Republic of Hawaii Advisory Council Council of State
- In office 1894–1898
- President: Sanford B. Dole

Member of the Provisional Government of Hawaii Advisory Council
- In office 1893–1894
- President: Sanford B. Dole

Member of the Kingdom of Hawaii House of Nobles for the island of Oahu
- In office 1892–1893
- Monarch: Liliʻuokalani

Member of the Kingdom of Hawaii Privy Council of State
- In office 1888–1893
- Monarchs: Kalākaua; Liliʻuokalani

Personal details
- Born: November 18, 1845 Hilo, Hawaii
- Died: December 12, 1906 (aged 61) Long Beach, California, United States of America
- Party: National Reform
- Spouse(s): Lydia Piʻikoi; Mary Kaho'oilimoku Lane; Maria Kealaulaokalani Lane
- Children: 9
- Occupation: Business magnate, politician

John Ena Jr. (November 18, 1845 – December 12, 1906) was a Hawaiian business magnate and politician. He was an advisor to both King Kalākaua and Queen Liliʻuokalani. After the overthrow of the Hawaiian Kingdom, his advisory position was retained during the Provisional Government and the Republic of Hawaii. Ena Road in Waikiki is his namesake.

== Name ==
His Hawaiian name was either John Liwai Kalaniopuuikapali-o-Molilele-ma-wai-o-Ahukini-Kau-Hawaii Ena, sometimes shortened as John Liwaikalaniopuu Ena, or John Kauluhinano Ena.

Ena received his Hawaiian language name Liwai Kalaniopuuikapali-o-Molilele-ma-wai-o-Ahukini-Kau-Hawaii from an incident in the 18th-century reign of King Kalaniʻōpuʻu. According to tradition, Kalaniʻōpuʻu hanged his kahuna Naonaoaina after the latter was unable to dig freshwater from the cliffs of Mōʻīlele, near Kalae in the district of Kaʻū. The name commemorates this event in history. However, his gravestone bears the name John Kauluhinano Ena.

== Early life ==
Ena was born November 18, 1845, in Hilo, on the island of Hawaii, of Chinese-Hawaiian ancestry. (Note: John Ena's Chinese-Hawaiian ancestry was emphasized in the Blount Report written by Commissioner James H. Blount who was sent by President Grover Cleveland to investigate the overthrow in 1893.(Blount 1895, p. 1116–1117, 1119–1120).) His father was Zane Shang Hsien (Chinese: 曾尚賢), part of the first wave of Chinese master sugar planters who emigrated to Hilo during the reign of Kamehameha III. His surname was Zane or Tseng. Like the other Chinese planters of that era, Zane adopted a Hawaiian name, John Ena Sr., (Note: Ena could also be written as ʻEna with the ʻokina or Hawaiian glottal stop.) from his Cantonese given name "Hsien", which is also pronounced "In". He married a Hawaiian woman, high chiefess Kaikilani or Kaikilaniwahinealiiopuna (1820–1878).

Kaikilani was the descendant of the aliʻi (chief) of the district of Puna on the island of Hawaii and notable ancestors include Ululani, Aliʻi of Hilo, and Kamanawa, one of the royal twins (with Kameʻeiamoku) who advised Kamehameha I in his conquest of the Hawaiian Islands. Another more distant ancestor was her namesake Kaikilani, Aliʻi Nui of the island of Hawaii.

Zane and Kaikilani's children were Amoe Ululani, John Jr., and Laura Amoy, all of whom attended American missionary Lucy Wetmore's children's school in Hilo. John Jr. was later educated at Pohukaina School in Honolulu and at the Roman Catholic College of ʻĀhuimanu. One of his early jobs was as a bookkeeper in Hilo.

== Inter-Island Steam Navigation Company ==
Canadian-born Thomas R. Foster had emigrated to Hawaii in 1857, married Mary Robinson, and joined her family's shipbuilding trade. He founded T. R. Foster & Co. in 1878 to engage in Hawaii's burgeoning steamship business. Ena moved to Honolulu, and found employment clerking for Foster, investing a portion of his wages in company stock. When Inter-Island Steam Navigation Company was launched in 1883, Foster was its president, and Ena was a founding partner. Other partners at incorporation were William Foster, George Norton Wilcox and the company's second president Captain William B. Godfrey.

Ena was the company's vice president when Godfrey retired in 1898, at which time Ena became corporate president, a position he held until illness forced his retirement. The bark John Ena, in which he owned stock shares, bore his image on the vessel's figurehead. Ena was also a shareholder in the bark Hawaiian Isles.

== Government service ==
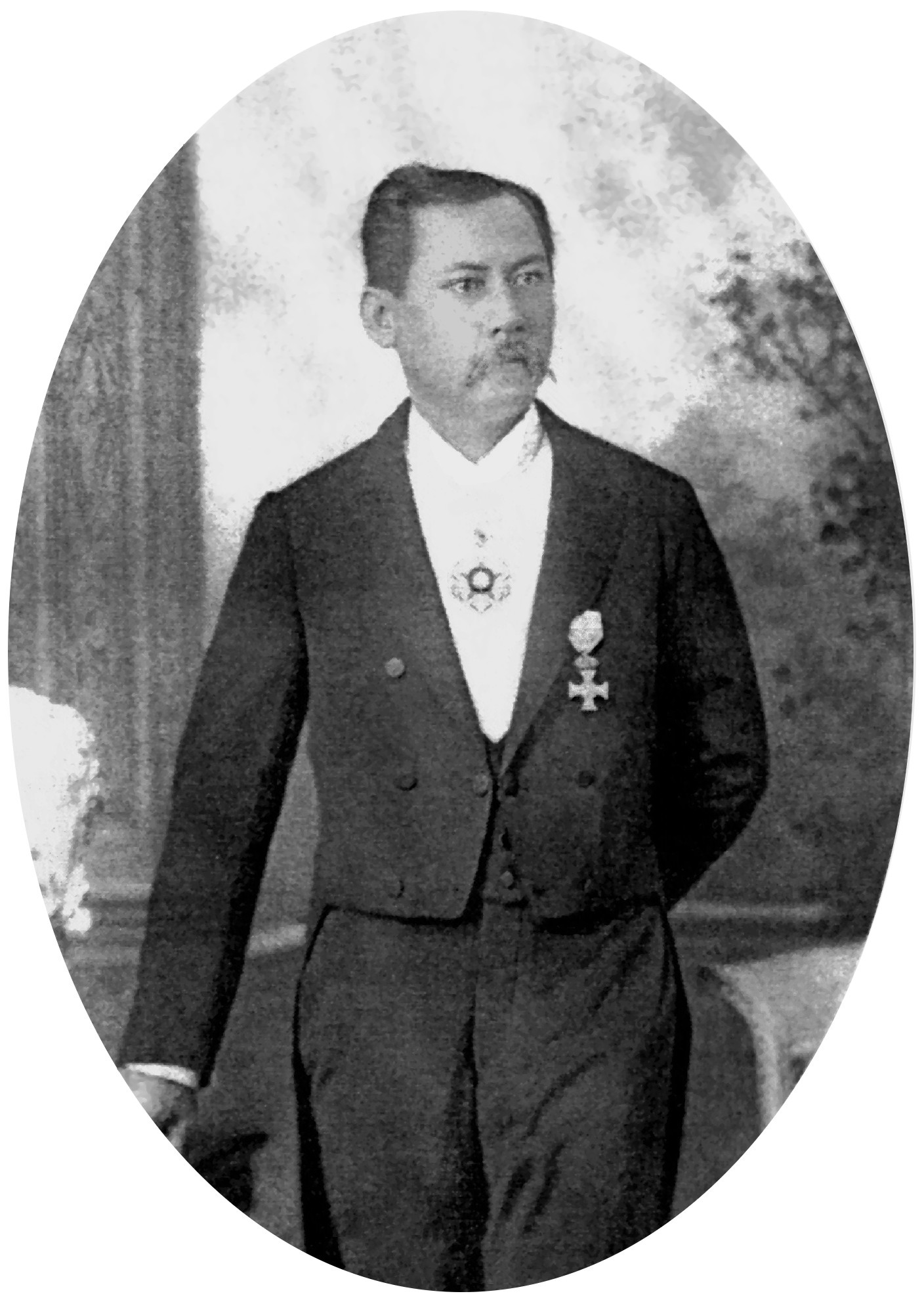
John Ena wearing his Hawaiian royal orders

Ena served on both Kalākaua's Privy Council of State from 1888 to 1891 and Liliʻuokalani's Privy Council of State from 1891 to 1893. He was decorated as an Officer of the Royal Order of the Crown of Hawaii on October 7, 1886, and his obituary also claimed he was also decorated with the Royal Order of the Star of Oceania. During the reign of Liliʻuokalani, he was appointed to the Board of Health on March 30, 1891.

Ena was elected to the legislative assembly in 1892. He ran as a candidate of the National Reform Party against National Liberal candidate E. B. Thomas. He was elected as a member of the House of Nobles, the upper house of the legislature, for a four-year term representing the island of Oahu. From May 1892 to January 1893, the legislature of the Kingdom convened for an unprecedented 171 days, which later historian Albertine Loomis dubbed the "Longest Legislature". During this session, Ena joined his fellow members in ousting a number of Queen Liliʻuokalani's cabinet ministers for want of confidence, a power introduced by the Bayonet Constitution of 1887 which empowered the legislative branch of government at the expense of the Queen. According to later testimony of Hermann A. Widemann in the 1893 Blount Report, Ena was one of the politicians who aspired to appointment as cabinet minister.

The monarchy was overthrown on January 17, 1893, by the Committee of Safety, with the support of United States Minister John L. Stevens and the landing of American forces from the USS Boston. The Provisional Government was established until an annexation treaty with the United States could be ratified. During this turbulent time, Ena joined the side of the Provisional Government. Under the Provisional Government, Ena served on the Advisory Council to president Sanford B. Dole, as well as on the Board of Health, and the Bureau of Agriculture and Forestry.

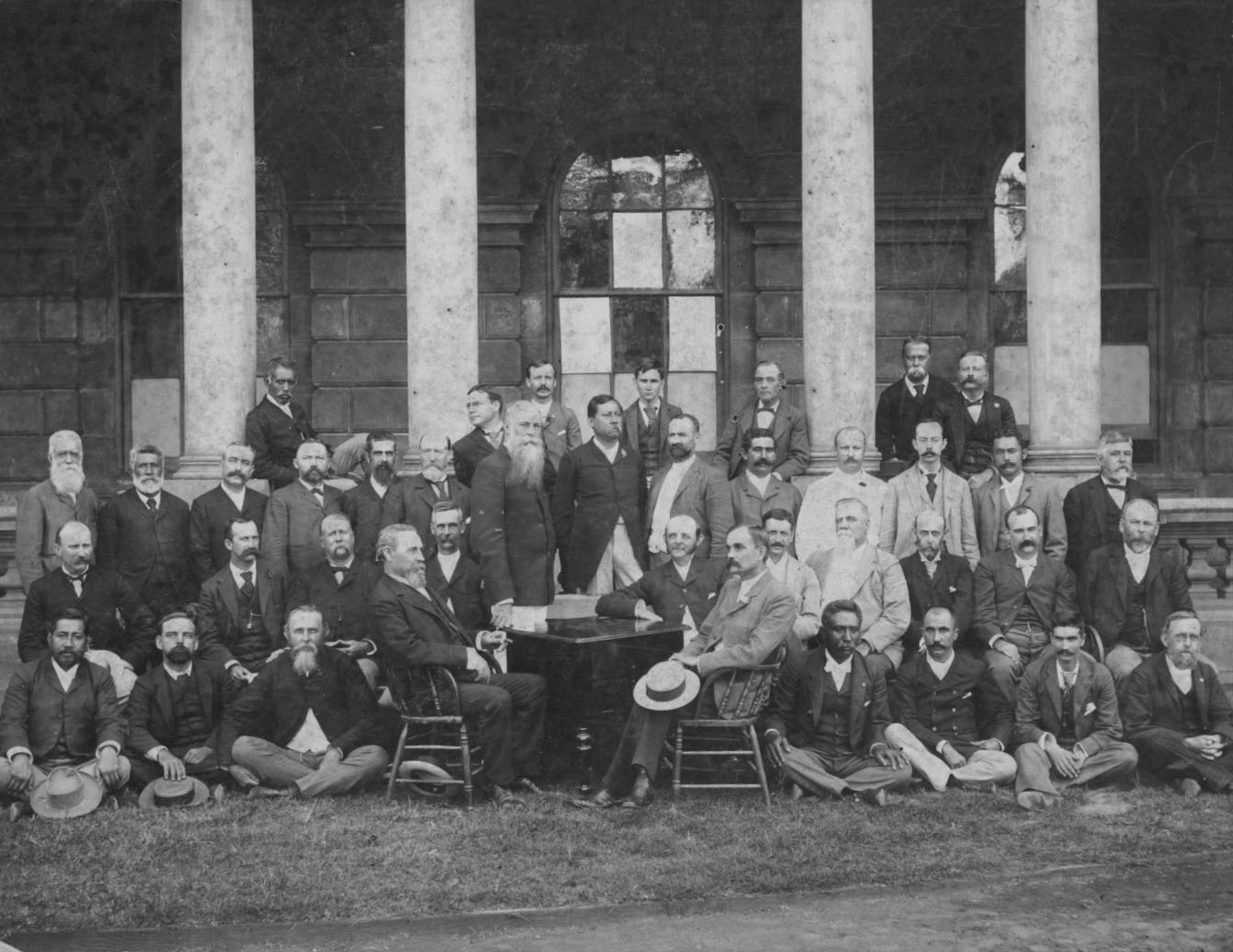
Members of the Constitutional Convention, Republic of Hawaii, 1894. John Ena stands next to President Dole in the center of the group

Ena was a participant of the Constitutional Convention for the oligarchical Republic of Hawaii, which was established on July 4, 1894, and was one of the five Native Hawaiian signatories of the Republic's constitution. (Note: Other Hawaiian signatories include: John William Kalua, Jose Kekahuna Iosepa, David Haili Kahaulelio, John Kauhane and Albert Kukailimoku Kunuiakea. (Blount 1895, p. 1371)) After Dole was named as the president of Republic of Hawaii, Ena was among the same advisors who were carried over in their positions from the Provisional Government.

== Personal life and investments ==
His first wife was Lydia Piʻikoi, daughter of high chief Jonah Piʻikoi and his wife Kamakeʻe. The couple divorced in 1883. With his second wife Mary Kahoʻoilimoku Lane (1859–1890), sister of future Mayor of Honolulu John C. Lane, he had nine children, including Mary Kapualahaole, Clara Keaolani, Thomas Foster Kaalokaiaokalani, Daisy Miliakalani, Ana Ululani, John Kalanikauhema and Mabel K. Two daughters Daisy Kekuakapulani and Violet died in infancy.

After Mary died in 1890, he subsequently married his wife's younger sister Maria Kealaulaokalani Lane (1862–1924), who survived him.

By the time of Ena's death in Long Beach, California on December 12, 1906, he had amassed considerable wealth through commerce and real estate holdings. He expanded his business investments in Honolulu to include shares in Honolulu Iron Works and Peck & Co. Although Ena inherited a Hilo sugar plantation from his father, his own investments brought the aggregate total to eight sugar plantations. He owned multiple residences in Hawaii, waterfront property in Honolulu and Waikiki, a farm, and varied extensive acreage throughout Oahu. Outside of Hawaii, Ena invested in Mexican gold mines and California real estate. When illness forced his retirement, he relocated to his 600-acre Seabright Ranch, one of his two ranches in Long Beach. He also owned a home in Berkeley, a 640-acre ranch in Kern County, and real estate in San Francisco.

Ena was buried at the King Street Catholic Cemetery in Honolulu, also known as the Honolulu Catholic Cemetery. He was laid to rest next to his mother Kaikilani, his second wife Mary Lane, and their infant daughters: Daisy and Violet. Ena Road in Waikiki is named for him.

== Bibliography ==
- Blount, James Henderson (1895). The Executive Documents of the House of Representatives for the Second Session of the Fifty-Third Congress, 1893–'94 in Thirty-One Volumes. Washington, DC: U.S. Government Printing Office. OCLC 191710879.
- Burnett, Claudine (2016). Died in Long Beach: Cemetery Tales. Bloomington: AuthorHouse. ISBN 978-1-5246-1101-9. OCLC 1124528780.
- Desha, Stephen (2000). Kamehameha and His Warrior Kekūhaupiʻo. Honolulu: Kamehameha Schools Press. ISBN 978-0-87336-056-2. OCLC 248030597.
- Hawaii (1918). Lydecker, Robert Colfax (ed.). Roster Legislatures of Hawaii, 1841–1918. Honolulu: Hawaiian Gazette Company. OCLC 60737418.
- Kai, Peggy (1974). "Chinese Settlers in the Village of Hilo Before 1852". The Hawaiian Journal of History. 8. Honolulu: Hawaiian Historical Society: 39–75. hdl:10524/221. OCLC 60626541.
- Kuykendall, Ralph Simpson (1967). The Hawaiian Kingdom 1874–1893, The Kalakaua Dynasty. Vol. 3. Honolulu: University of Hawaii Press. ISBN 978-0-87022-433-1. OCLC 500374815.
- Loomis, Albertine (1963). "The Longest Legislature" (PDF). Seventy-First Annual Report of the Hawaiian Historical Society for the Year 1962. 71. Honolulu: Hawaiian Historical Society: 7–27. hdl:10524/35.
- McKinzie, Edith Kawelohea (1986). Stagner, Ishmael W. (ed.). Hawaiian Genealogies: Extracted from Hawaiian Language Newspapers. Vol. 2. Honolulu: University of Hawaii Press. ISBN 978-0-939154-37-1. OCLC 12555087.
- Osorio, Jon Kamakawiwoʻole (2002). Dismembering Lāhui: A History of the Hawaiian Nation to 1887. Honolulu: University of Hawaii Press. ISBN 0-8248-2549-7. OCLC 48579247.
- Pukui, Mary Kawena; Elbert, Samuel H.; Mookini, Esther T. (1974). Place Names of Hawaii. Honolulu: University of Hawaii Press. ISBN 978-0-8248-0524-1. OCLC 1042464.
