= Foster Botanical Garden =

Botanical garden in Honolulu, Hawaii, United States

- U.S. National Register of Historic Places
- U.S. Historic district
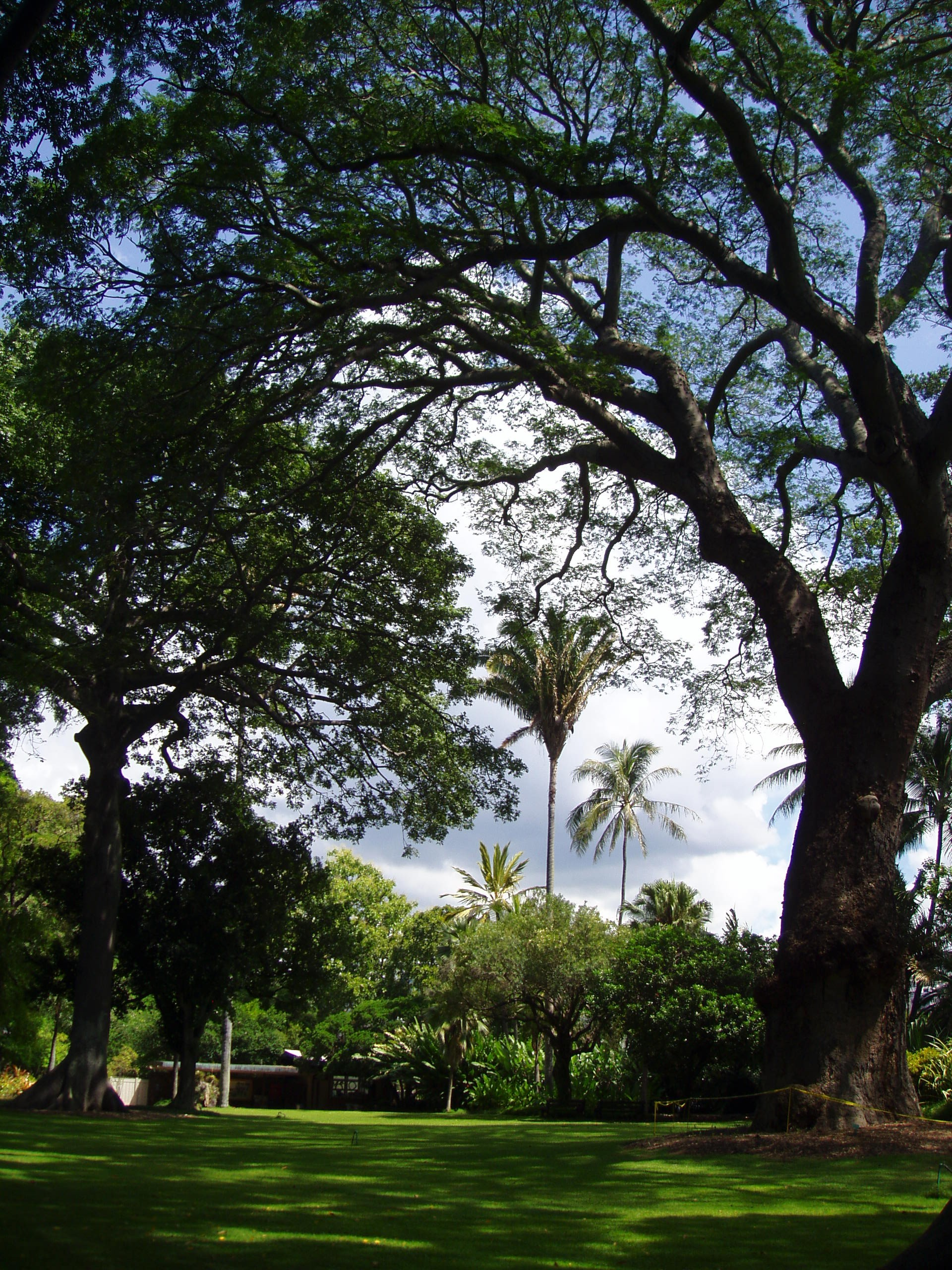
- General view of the garden

- Location within Hawaii
- Location: 50 N. Vineyard Blvd., Honolulu, Hawaii
- Coordinates: 21°19′00″N 157°51′33″W
- Built: 1853
- Architect: Harold L. Lyon
- Website: Official website
- NRHP reference No.: 93000377
- Added to NRHP: May 13, 1993

Foster Botanical Garden, measuring 13.5 acres (5.5 ha), is one of five public botanical gardens on Oahu. It is located at 50 North Vineyard Boulevard, Honolulu, Hawaii, United States, near Chinatown at the intersection of Nu'uanu Avenue and Vineyard Boulevard. Foster is in a highly urban area with strip malls, schools, and Buddhist, Shinto, and Methodist religious facilities nearby.

The Garden is the oldest botanical garden in Hawaii, and listed on the National Register of Historic Places.

== History ==
In 1853, Queen Kalama leased 4.6 acres (1.9 ha) of land to William Hillebrand, a German physician and botanist who built his home and planted trees on the site. During his stay, he introduced a number of plants to Hawaii, as well as deer and mynah birds. Many of the large trees growing today on the Upper Terrace were Hillebrand's plantings. After 20 years Hillebrand returned to Germany, where he published Flora of the Hawaiian Islands in 1888. In 1884 the property was sold to Thomas R. Foster and his wife Mary E. Foster (née Robinson), who continued to develop the garden as their homesite. Upon her death in 1930, Mary Foster bequeathed the land and her home to the City and County of Honolulu, with the provision that the city "accept and forever keep and properly maintain the (gardens) as a public and tropical park to be known and called Foster Park". At the time, the gardens were roughly 5.5 acres (2.2 ha).

Dr. Harold Lyon, the first director of Foster Garden, introduced thousands of new plants and trees to Hawaii, and started its famous orchid collection. Paul Weissich, director from 1957 to 1989, expanded Foster Garden to 14 acres (5.7 ha) of native plants, and developed four additional sites on Oahu Island to create the 650 acres (260 ha) Honolulu Botanical Gardens system. Taken as a whole, these five gardens feature rare species from tropical environments ranging from desert to rainforest, comprising the largest and most diverse tropical plant collection in the United States.

== Foster Botanical Garden today ==
Today the garden consists of the Upper Terrace (the oldest part of the garden); Middle Terraces (palms, aroids, heliconias, gingers); Economic Garden (herbs, spices, dyes, poisons); Prehistoric Glen (primitive plants planted in 1965); Lyon Orchid Garden; and Hybrid Orchid Display. It also contains a number of exceptional trees, including a Sacred Fig which is a clone descendant of the Bodhi tree that Buddha sat under for inspiration, a sapling of which was gifted to Mary Foster by Anagarika Dharmapala in 1913. All told, it contains 25 of about 100 Oahu trees designated as exceptional.

The garden also contains several memorials and sculptures:

- A small replica of the Daibutsu of Kamakura commemorates 100 years of Japanese immigration to Hawaii
- A memorial stone on the site of the first Japanese language school on Oahu, where an anti-aircraft shell exploded into an auditorium full of children during the Japanese attack on Pearl Harbor
- The 1977 abstract ceramic sculpture Sandwich Isle by artist Bob Flint
- The 1974 sculpture Tree by Charles W. Watson

== Images ==
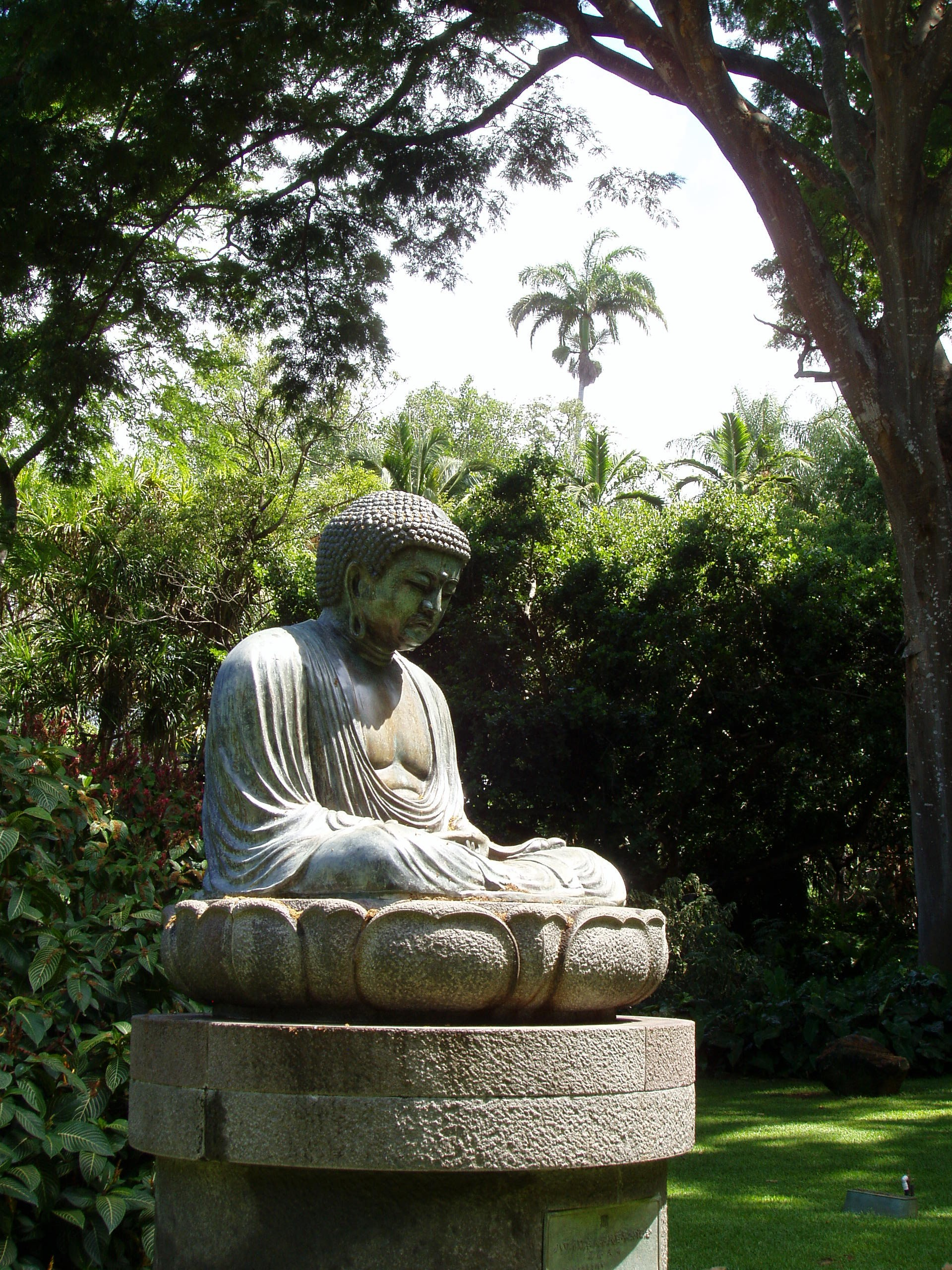
Daibutsu commemorating Japanese immigration

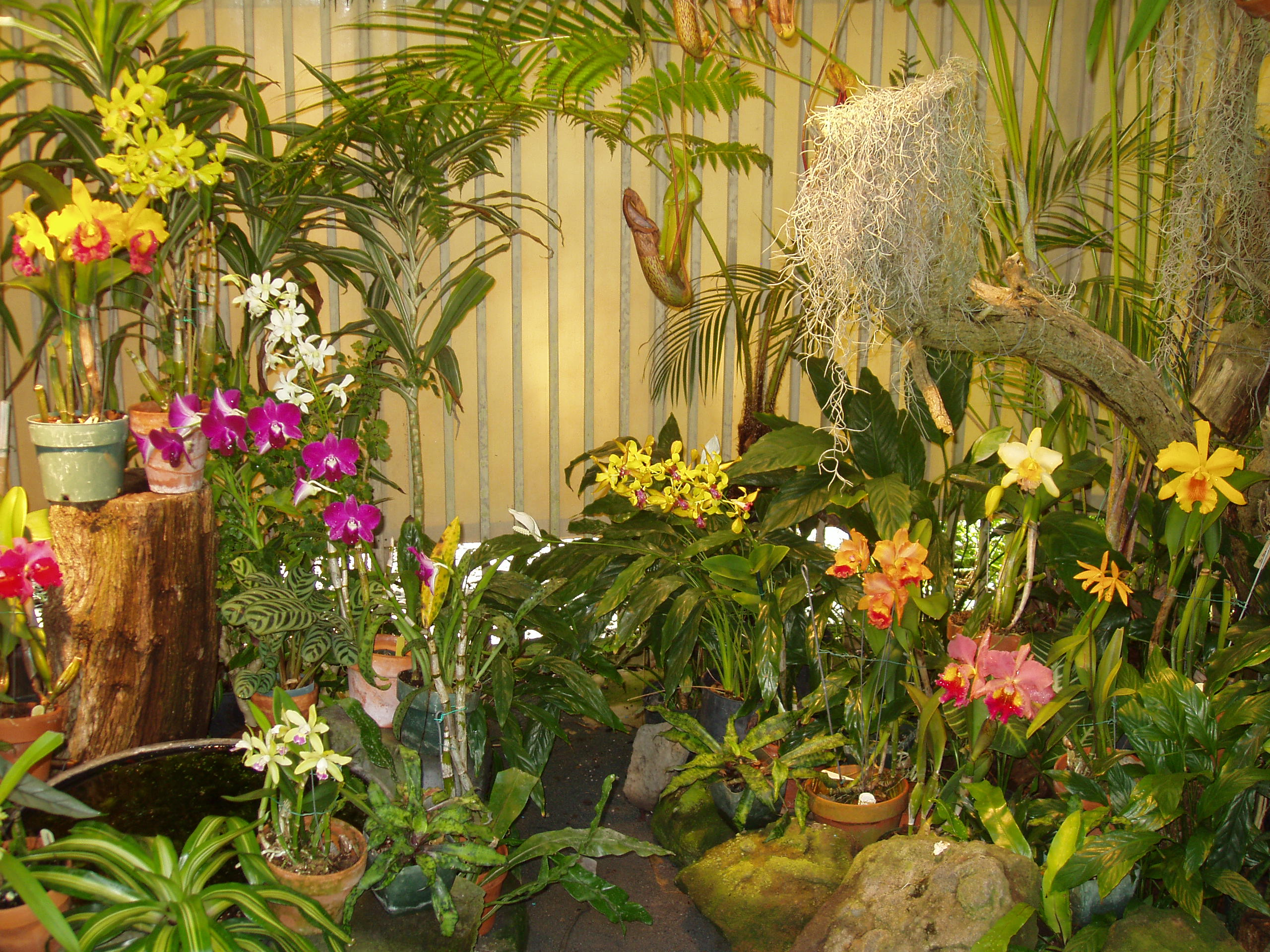
Orchid display

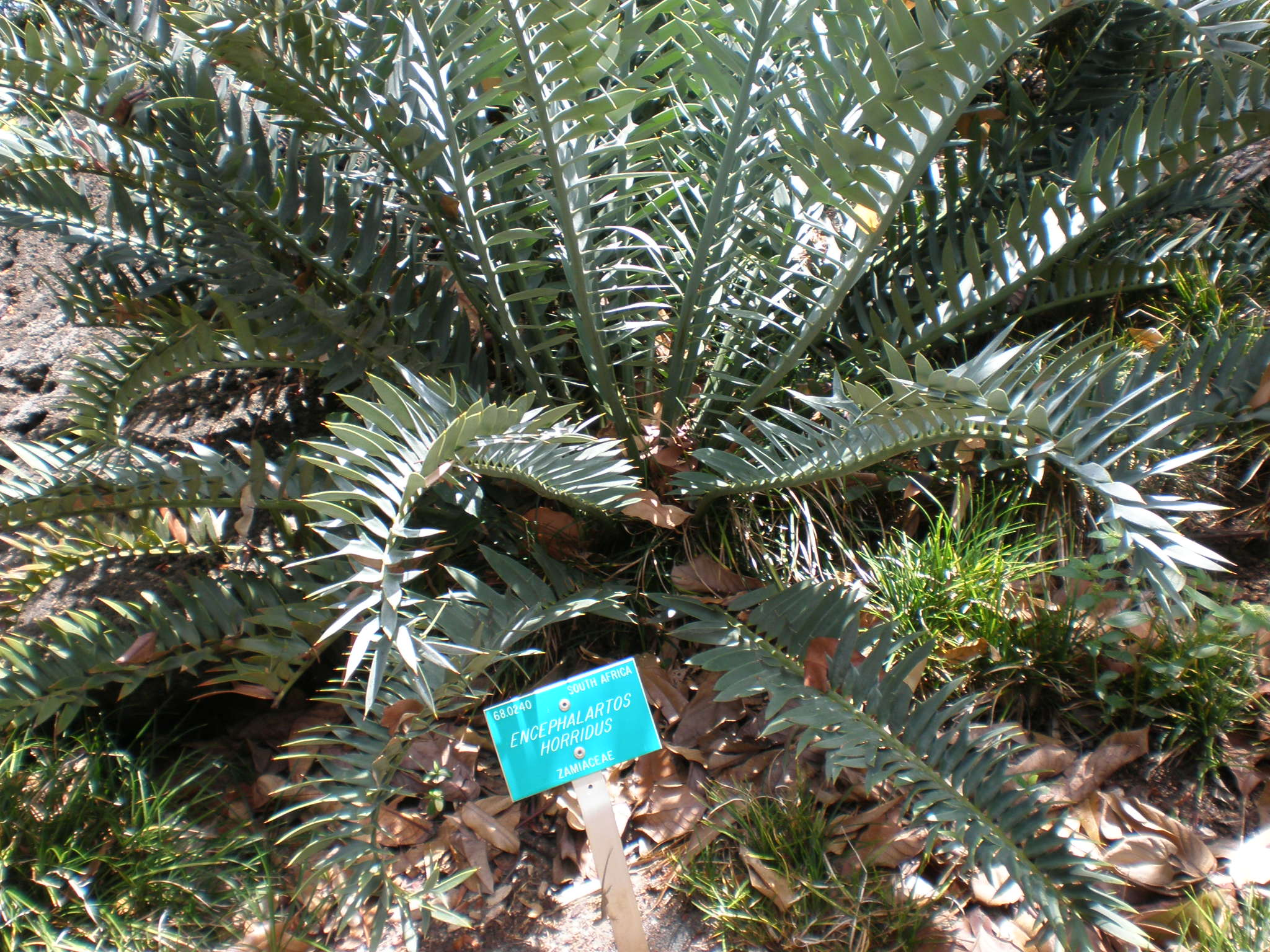
Encephalartos horridus in prehistoric glen

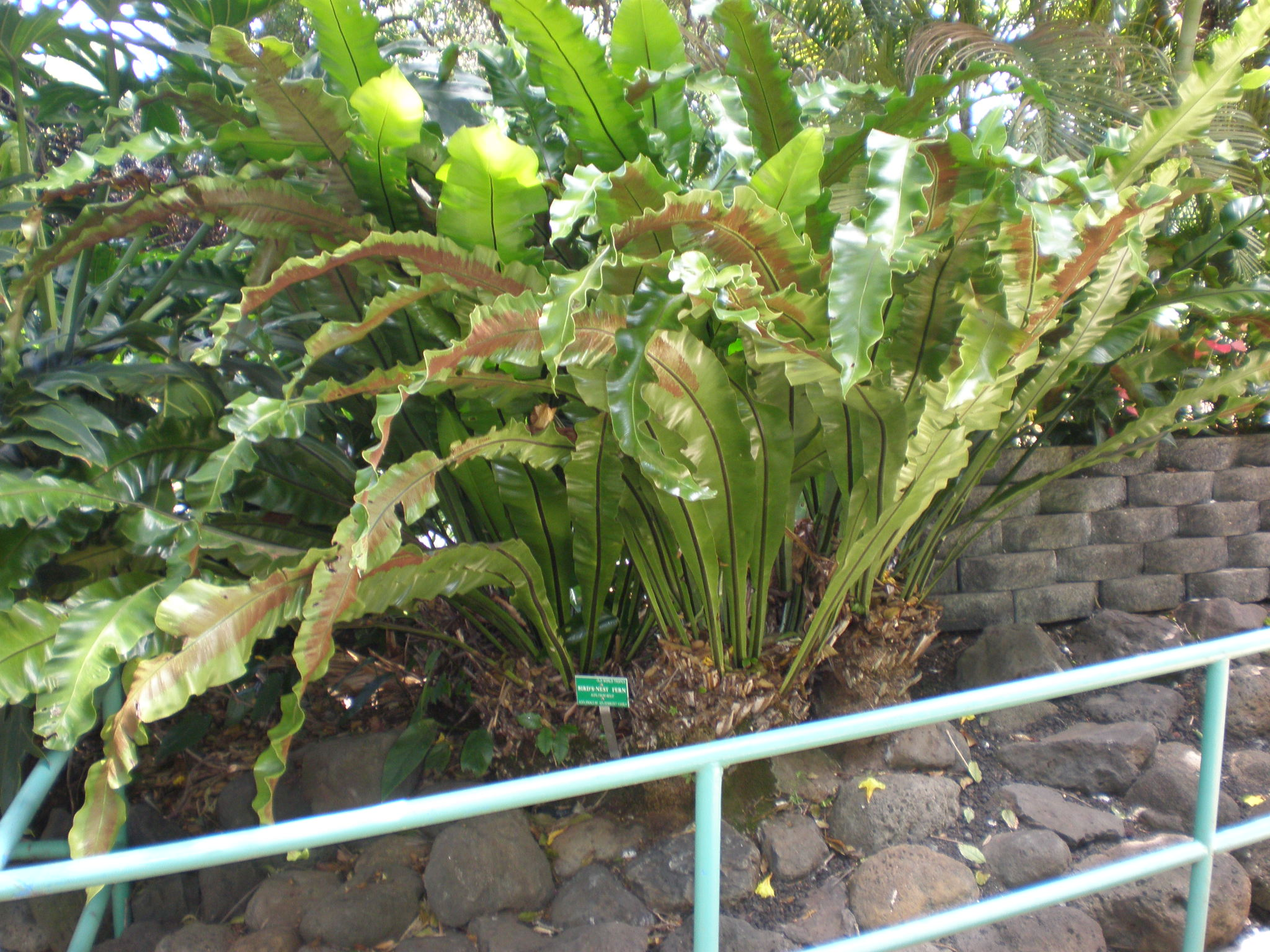
Bird's nest fern

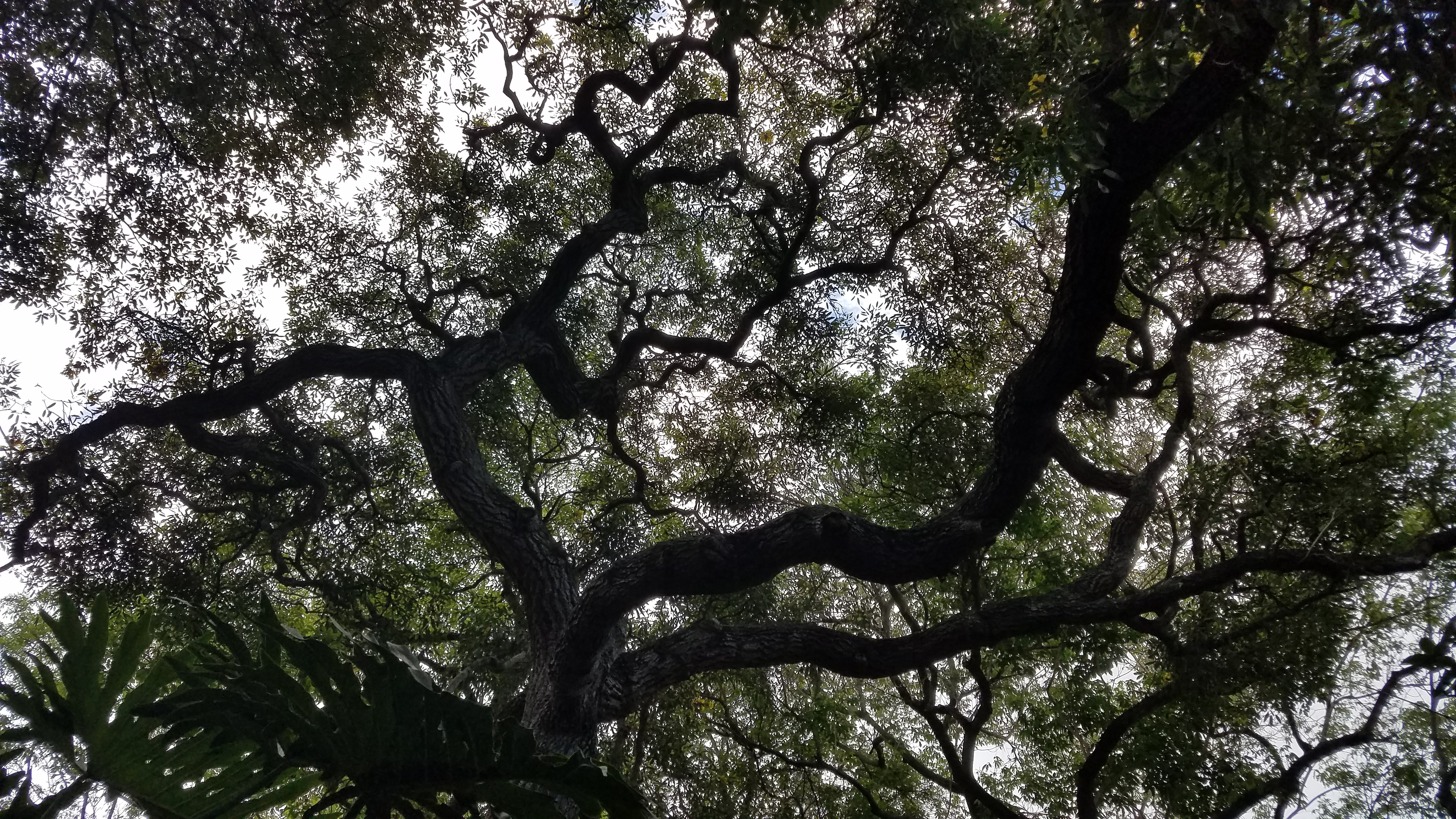
A banyan tree

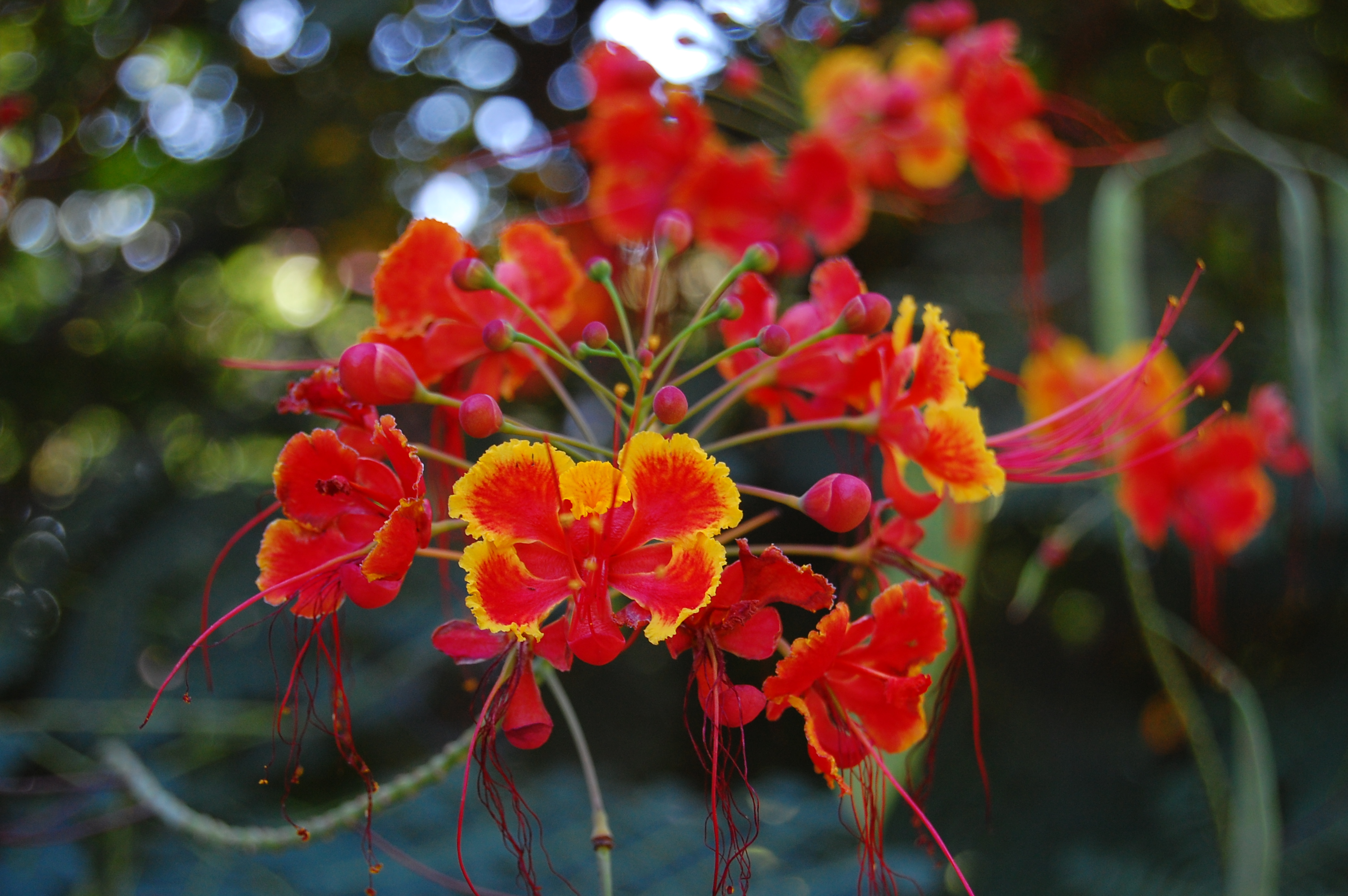
'Ohai-ali'i plant in bloom (October 2012)

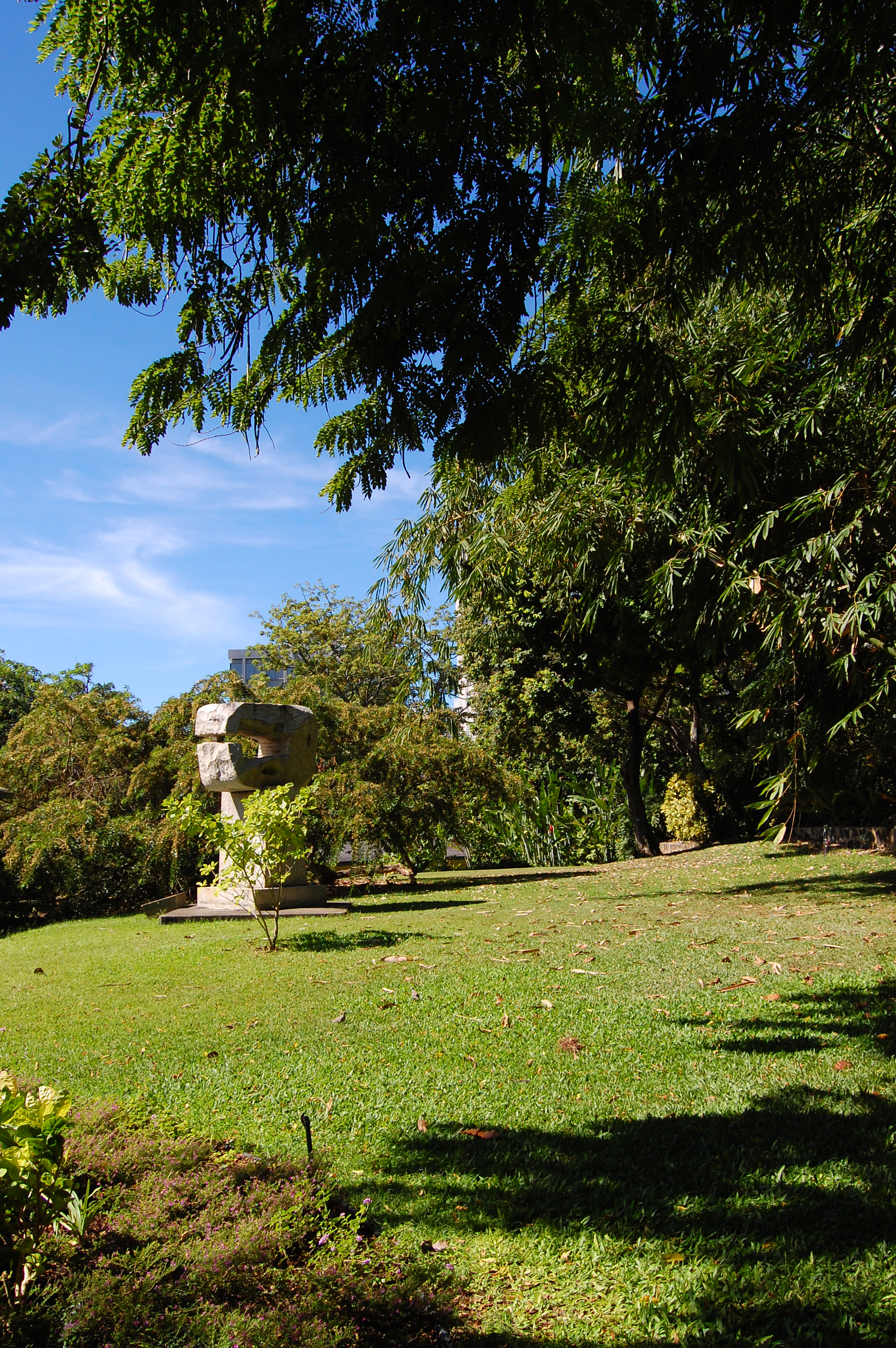
Sculpture near the conservatory (October 2012)

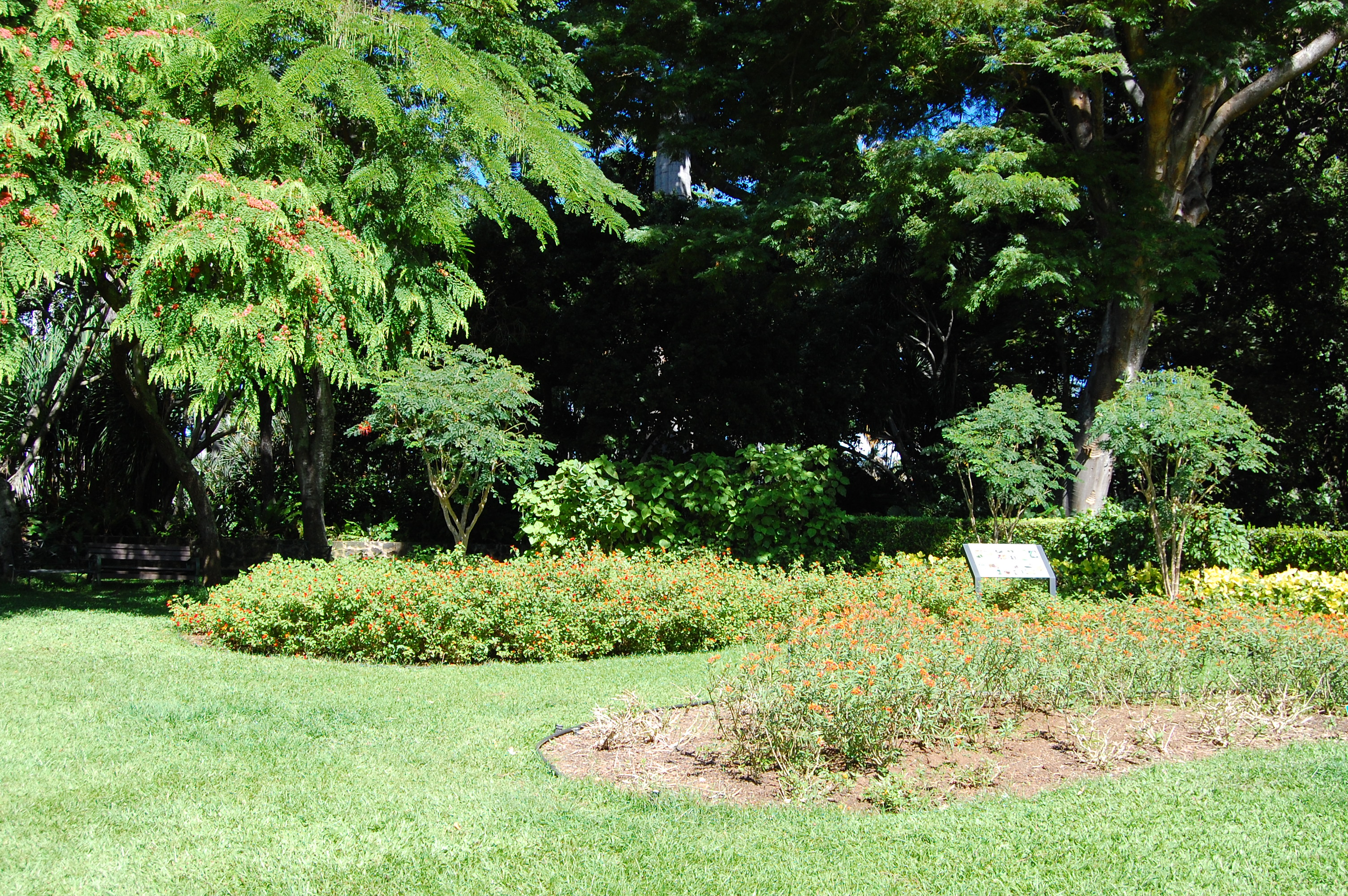
Butterfly garden near the conservatory (October 2012)

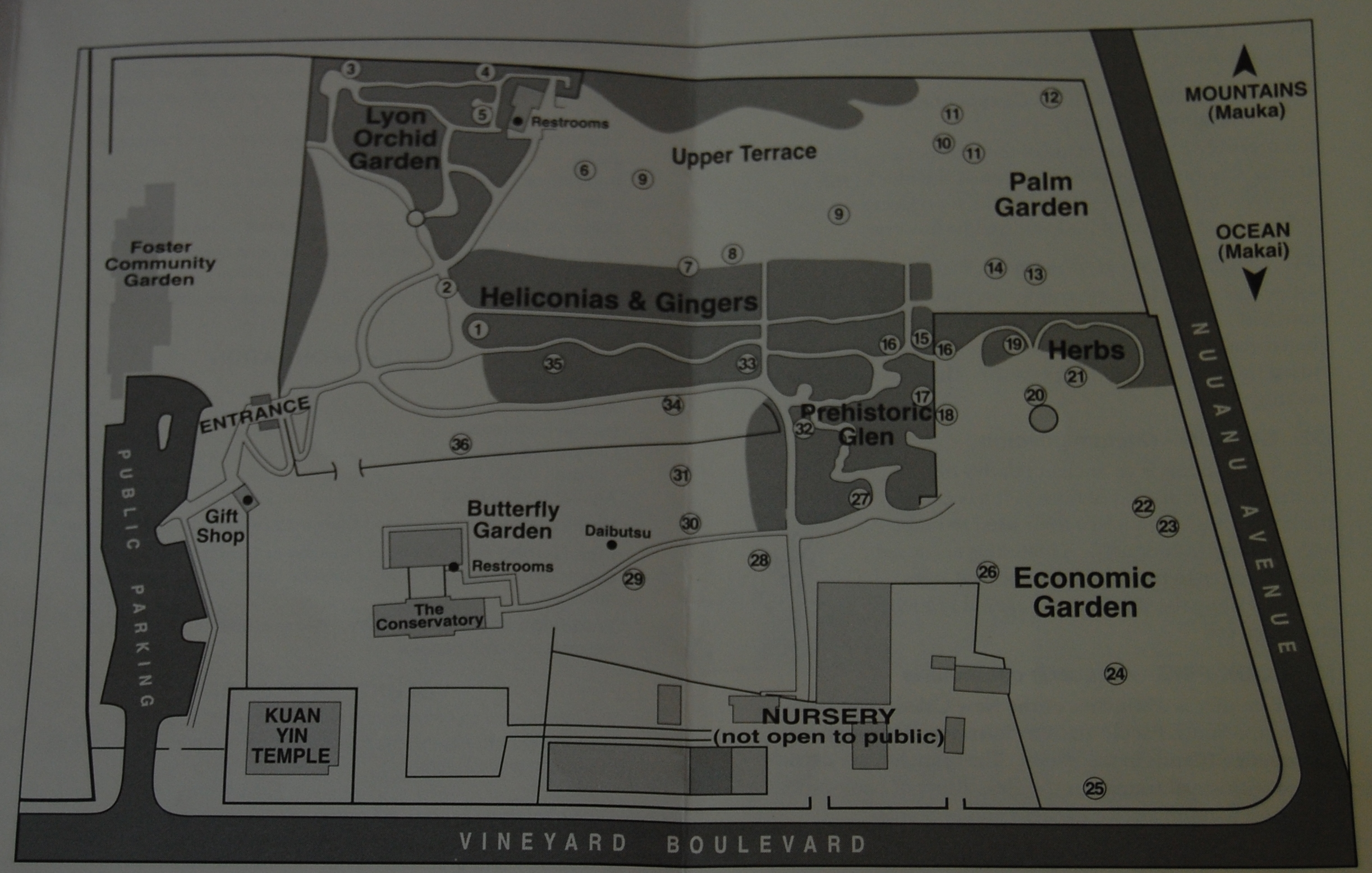
Map of the Foster Botanical Garden (October 2012)

== See also ==
- List of botanical gardens in the United States
