= Hilo massacre =

Incident that occurred on 1 August 1938, in Hilo, Hawaii

Hilo Massacre
- Location: Hilo, Hawaii
- Date: 1 August 1938; 10:00 a.m.
- Target: IBU, MTC, ILWU, Hawaii Territorial Guard
- Attack type: Police brutality
- Weapons: Tear gas, Riot guns with Bayonets
- Deaths: 0
- Injuries: 50
- Victim: 200-300 protesters
- Perpetrator: Hawai‘i County Police Department
- No. of participants: 74
- Defender: Hawaii Territorial Guard

The Hilo Massacre, also known as Bloody Monday, was an incident that occurred on 1 August 1938, in Hilo, Hawaii, when over 70 police officers attempted to disband 200 unarmed protesters during a strike, injuring 50 of the demonstrators. In their attempts to disband the crowd, officers tear gassed, hosed and finally fired their riot guns at the protesters, leading to 50 injuries, but no deaths.

These protesters were from a number of ethnicities, including Chinese, Japanese, Native Hawaiian, Luso and Filipino Americans, and from a number of different unions, including the International Longshoremen's and Warehousemen's Union. The different groups, long at odds, put aside their differences to challenge the Inter-Island Steam Navigation Company. The unions, led by longshoreman Harry Kamoku, demanded equal wages with workers on the West Coast of the United States and closed shop or union shop.

Strikes began on 4 February 1938, and culminated on 1 August when 200 workers gathered to protest the arrival of the SS Waialeale, a steamship owned by the Inter-Island Steam Navigation Company. The protesters were ordered to disband, but refused to comply. Force was used, resulting in hospitalizations.

== Background ==
As part of the New Deal, Congress in 1935 passed the Wagner Act, legalizing workers' right to join and be represented by labor unions. Hawaii — not yet a State — had been, starting in the 1920s, virtually controlled by the "Big Five": Alexander & Baldwin, C. Brewer, Castle & Cooke, American Factors, and Theo. Davies. Furthermore, the Hawaii labor force had been divided up into racial blocs, which helped keep wages low.

Harry Kamoku (1905–1957) was the primary organizer and leader of the first real union in Hawaii to be legally recognized. Kamoku was a Chinese-Hawaiian and a longshoreman, born in Hilo.

On November 22, 1935 Kamoku and about 30 longshoremen of every ethnicity formed the Hilo Longshoremen's Association. This successful, and other unions were created or came into Hawaii from other states or countries, including the Inland Boatmen's Union (IBU), the International Longshoremen's and Warehousemen's Union (ILWU) and the Metal Trades Council (MTC).

== The strikes ==
On 4 February 1938, strikes began. The strikers demanded equal wages with workers on the West Coast and closed shop or union shop. Strikes continued well into July and August. The SS Waialeale, owned by the Inter-Island Steamship Company, which in turn was owned by the Big Five, was due to come into port on 1 August. On that day, protesters from different unions arrived to protest the ship's docking. Witnesses estimated the crowd anywhere from 80 to 800, with the newspapers reports saying around 500 to 600. It is likely, however, that there were only around 200 protesters.

== The incident ==
After the ship docked, the crowd advanced down the dock. The police had set up a "dead line" that the protesters were not supposed to cross. The protesters, however, crossed it. The police threw about a dozen tear gas grenades into the crowd. Among the protesters were members of the Hawaii Territorial Guard who took action and threw tear gas grenades back at the police or away from the crowd. They were also instrumental in providing the unions police plans on how the police were going to react to the strike. The tear gas did cause some protesters to leave and temporary confusion, but after regrouping, the crowd kept on advancing.

Meanwhile, the police were getting ready to bring out fire truck hoses. The police sprayed the crowd with water. During this, the police made no attempt to make any arrests, being unsure whether or not they had jurisdiction. The protesters eventually regrouped.

The protesters remained peaceful the vast majority of the time, sitting down and refusing to leave when confronted by police officers.

Sheriff Henry K. Martin ordered the police officers to change out their ammunition from buckshot to birdshot to disperse the crowd without fatalities. Police warned the demonstrators they would fire on them if they did not disperse voluntarily; few heeded the warning. At 10:20 a.m., Lieutenant Charles Warren stabbed one of the protesters in the back with a bayonet. The police then opened fire for five minutes on the crowd with birdshot, and with buckshot from police officers who failed to hear the orders. At least 16 rounds of ammunition were fired, and at least 50 people were shot, including two women and two children.

== Aftermath ==
Later that day, a larger crowd gathered to be addressed by Harry Kamoku. Estimates of the size of the crowd range from 500 to 3000 people. Kamoku said, "The only reason we know for them shooting at us like criminals is that we are members of our chosen unions. The order to shoot came while we were sitting down."

Joseph V. Hodgson (1899–1973) was appointed Attorney General of the territory by Governor Joseph Poindexter a few weeks before the Hilo Massacre. Hodgson later released the Hodgson Report, which reported on the Massacre.

In October 1938, injured protester Kai Uratani filed a lawsuit against the officers responsible for the shooting. He lost, and instead had to pay for the officers' defense costs.

== Legacy ==
Despite the injuries, the strike did not achieve any immediate major gains for the unions. However, within ten years, Hawaii unions had become powerful, and the August 1 anniversary of the Hilo massacre was regularly commemorated at the Hilo docks.

== Bibliography ==
- Puette, William J. (1988), The Hilo Massacre: Hawaii's Bloody Monday, August 1st, 1938, Honolulu: University of Hawaii, Center for Labor Education & Research
- Hirose, Stacey; Brian Niiya (1993), Japanese American History: An A-to-Z Reference from 1868 to the Present, Verlag für die Deutsche Wirtschaft AG, p. 163, ISBN 978-0-8160-2680-7
