= Inter-Island Steam Navigation Company =

Hawaiian steamship and ferry company

Inter-Island Steam Navigation Co.
- house flag

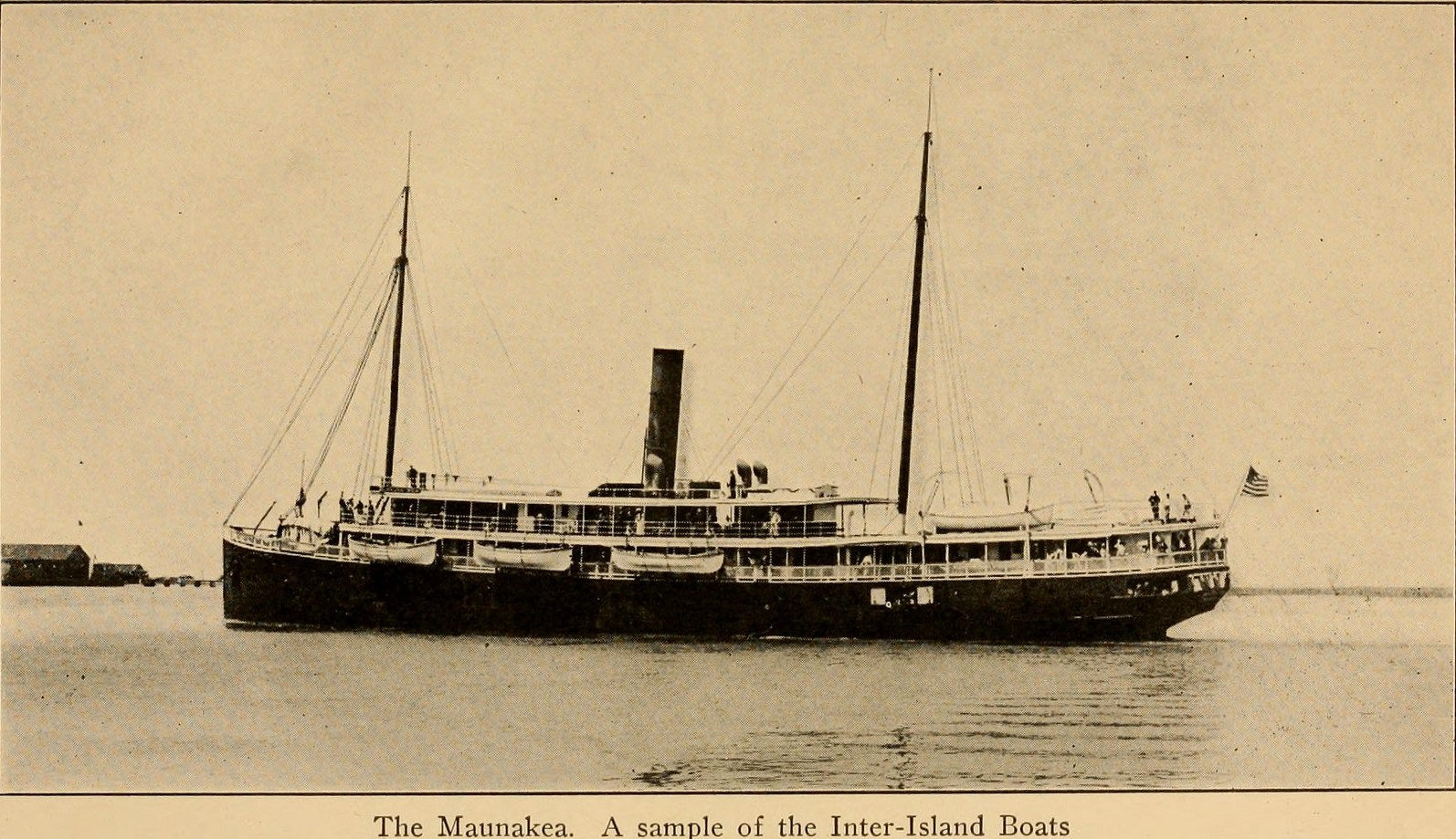
- Inter-Island Steam Navigation Co.'s the "SS Maunakea" in Hawaii, 1918
- Founded: February 7, 1883
- Founder: Thomas R. Foster
- Defunct: 1947
- Headquarters: Honolulu, HI
- Area served: Hawaiian Islands
- Key people: John Ena - Pres. 1898-1902; James A. Kennedy - Pres. 1902-1926; Stanley Kennedy Sr. - Pres. 1933-1947
- Services: Passenger and cargo transportation between the Hawaiian Islands

Inter-Island Steam Navigation Company was headquartered in Honolulu and ran steamship passenger and cargo service between the Hawaiian Islands from 1883 until 1947. Inter-Island constructed the Kona Inn in 1928, the first hotel in Kona on the Big Island of Hawaii. In 1929, Inter-Island created an airline subsidiary, Inter-Island Airways, that is still operating as Hawaiian Airlines.

== History ==
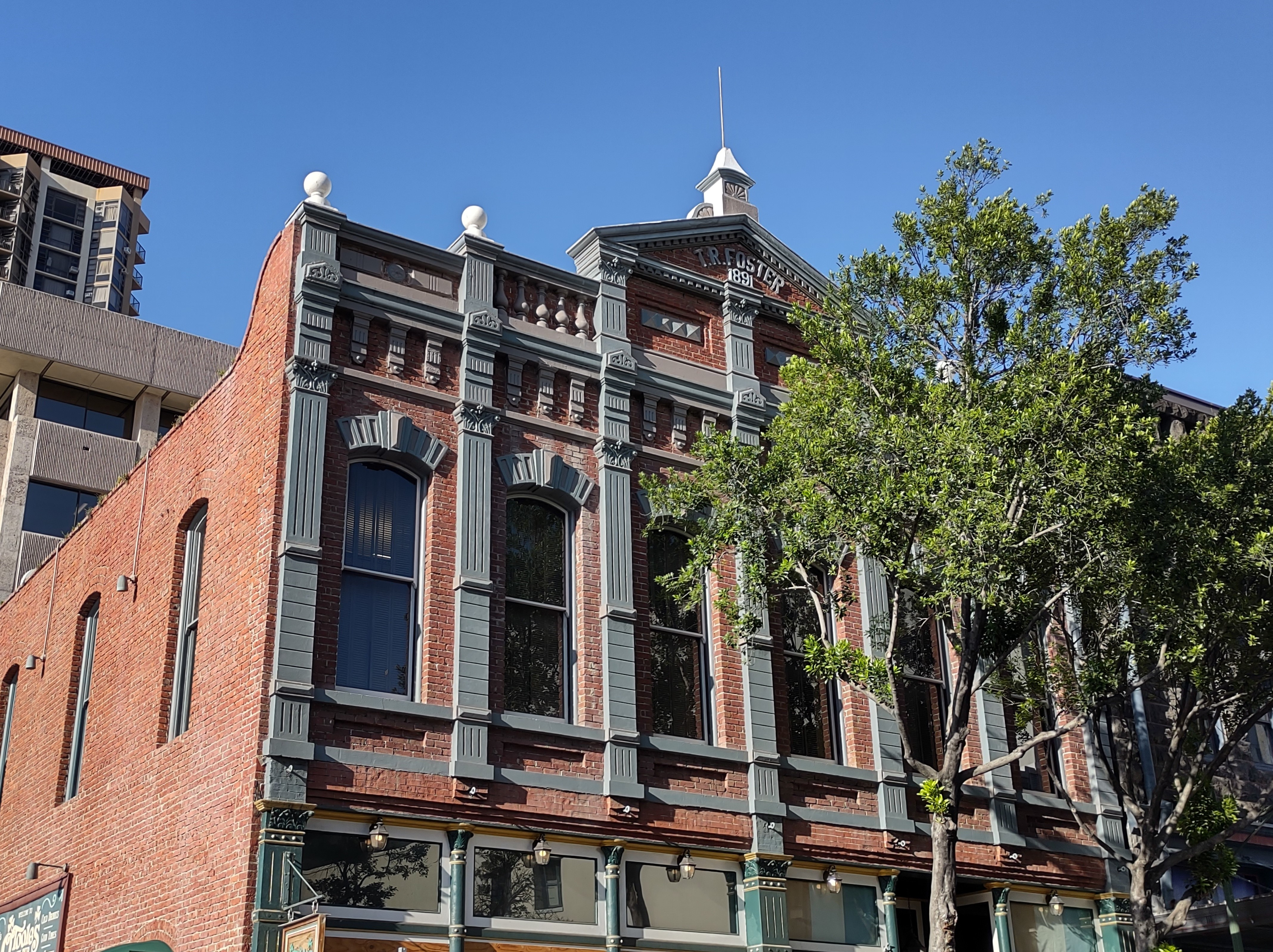
Inter-Island's office and warehouse

Shipbuilder Thomas R. Foster moved to Hawaii in 1857 and founded Inter-Island Steam Navigation in 1883 with partners W.B. Godfrey, G.N. Wilcox, A.S. Wilcox, and J.M. Sass. Inter-Island's early ships included the SS James Makee, SS Planter, SS CR Bishop, SS Iwalani, and the SS Helene. Inter-Island's headquarters were at 902 Nuuanu Avenue in downtown Honolulu in the T.R. Foster building. James A. Kennedy was recruited from the Honolulu Iron Works to become President of Inter-Island in 1902. In 1905, Kennedy absorbed the Wilder Steamship Co. into Inter-Island, creating the largest fleet of steamers serving the Hawaiian Islands. In 1925, Inter-Island had four steamers: SS Humuula, SS Hawaii, SS Waialeale, and SS Haulalai

=== Kona Inn ===
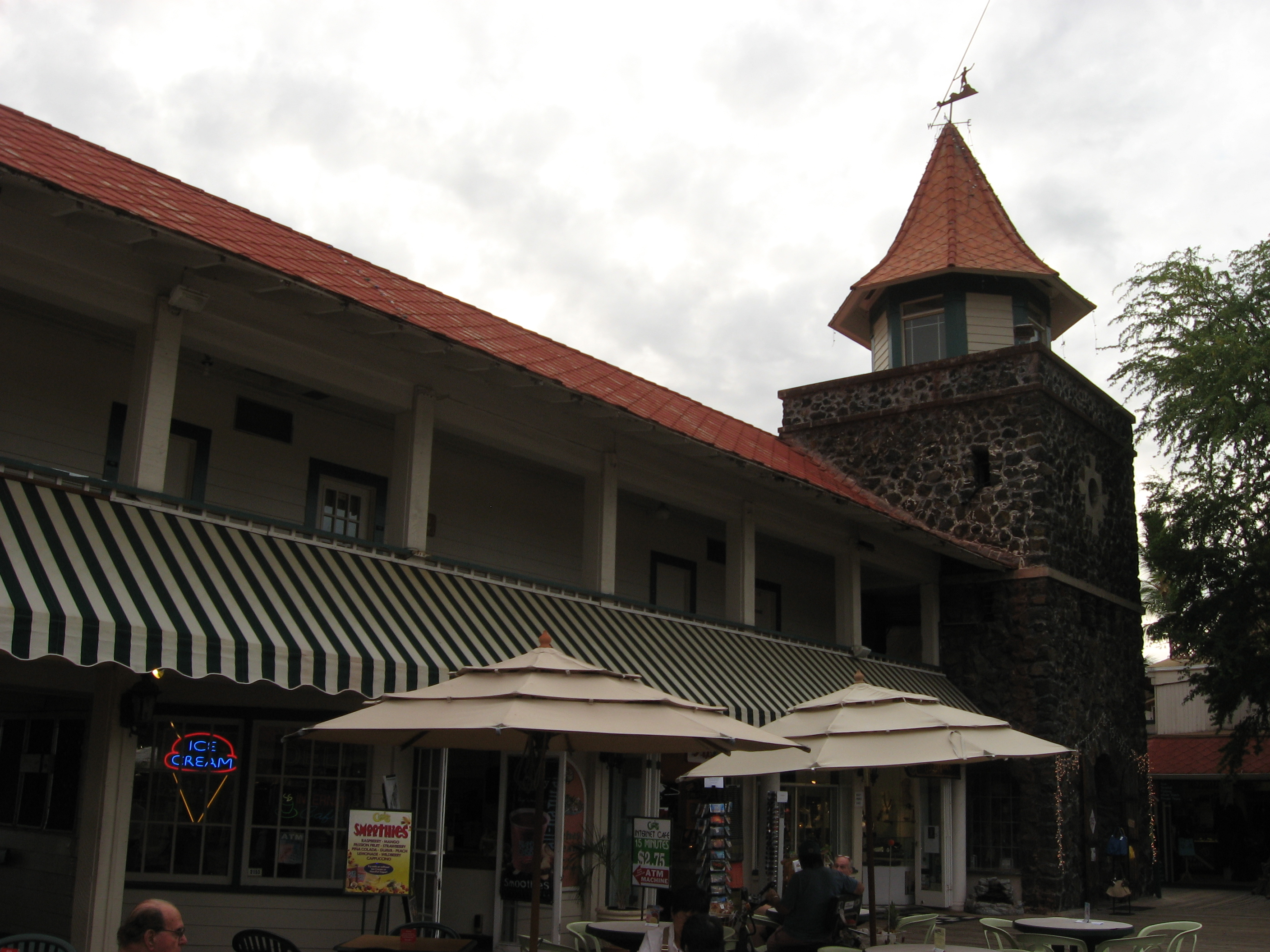
Kona Inn Shopping Village

To promote travel to the Big Island, Inter-Island's board of directors approved the construction of the Kona Inn, the first hotel in Kona. They hired architect Charles William Dickey, who was known for his distinctive Hawaiian style design. The oceanfront Kona Inn opened in 1928, with 20 rooms, a salt water swimming pool, tennis courts, spacious lawns, cocktail lounge, and luaus. The Kona Inn eventually expanded to 220 rooms, and helped turn Kona into a premier tourist destination The Kona Inn was converted into the Kona Inn Shopping Village in 1980.

=== Inter-Island Airways ===
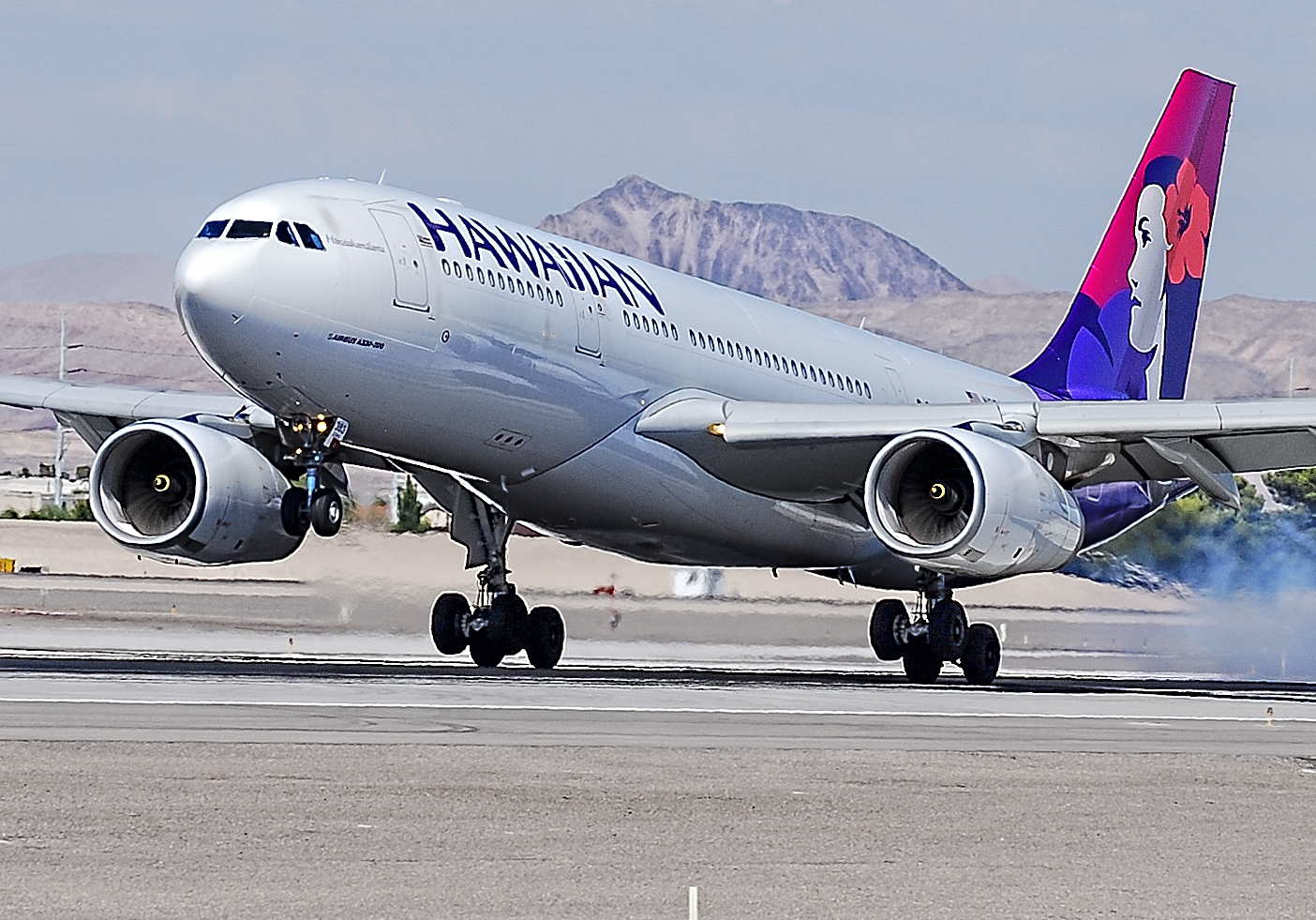
Hawaiian Airlines Airbus A330

James Kennedy's son, Stanley Kennedy Sr., returned from WWI after flying Curtiss H-16 flyingboats for the US Navy and joined his father in management at Inter-Island. Stan Kennedy convinced the Inter-Island Steam Navigation Board of Directors to expand their business into the fledgling aviation industry. On January 30, 1929, the company founded a subsidiary, Inter-Island Airways, that would later become Hawaiian Airlines.

=== Strike of 1938 ===
On August 1, 1938, protests against the company by several unions resulted in the Hilo massacre. Inter-Island's SS Waialeale arrived in Hilo crewed by strike-breakers, to be met by 200 protesting longshoremen. A riot ensued between the police and longshoremen with at least 16 rounds fired (7 birdshot and 9 buckshot), at least one bayonet stabbing, clubs, and fire hoses. There were no fatalities, but many injuries.

=== Downfall ===
During WWII, Inter-Island Steam Navigation's ships were commandeered into military service by the War Shipping Administration. The lack of civilian cargo ships led to the proliferation of airborne cargo and passenger transportation between the Hawaiian Islands. The 14 hour voyage from Honolulu to Hilo on a steamer, could now be done in 100 minutes on a DC-3 aircraft. Inter-Island Steam Navigation's passenger and cargo service was essentially a victim of Inter-Island Airways success, as well as the creation of Aloha Airlines in 1946, and discontinued operations in 1947.

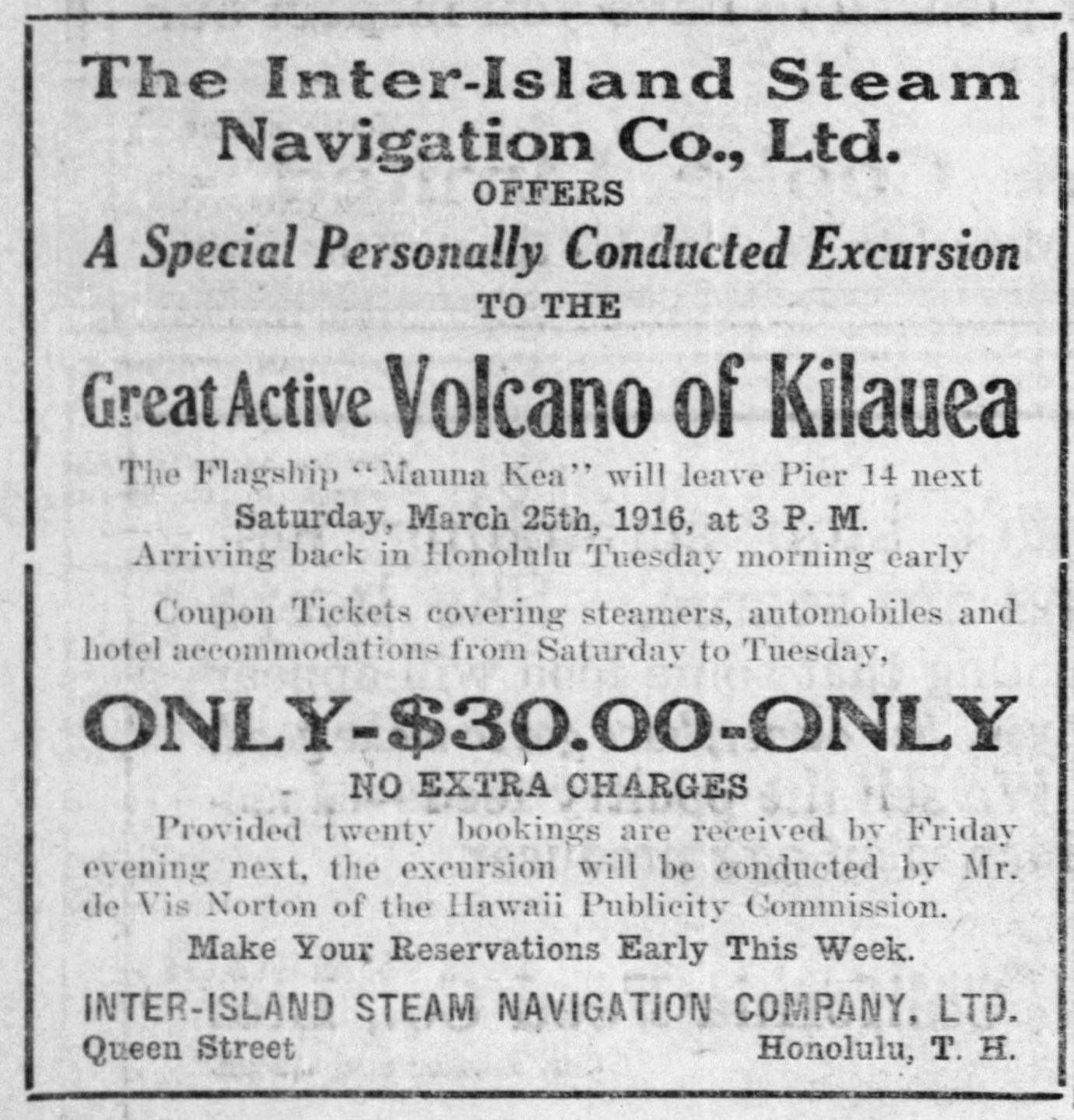
March 1916 advertisement

== Fleet ==
- Waimea (-1923), bought in March 1923 by the Los Angeles Steamship Company for their Los Angeles-San Francisco service.
- Haleakala (1923-), replacement for the Wimea (unclear if purchased or not).
