= Stanley Kennedy Sr. =

Aviator and airline founder (1890–1968)

Stanley Carmichael Kennedy Sr.
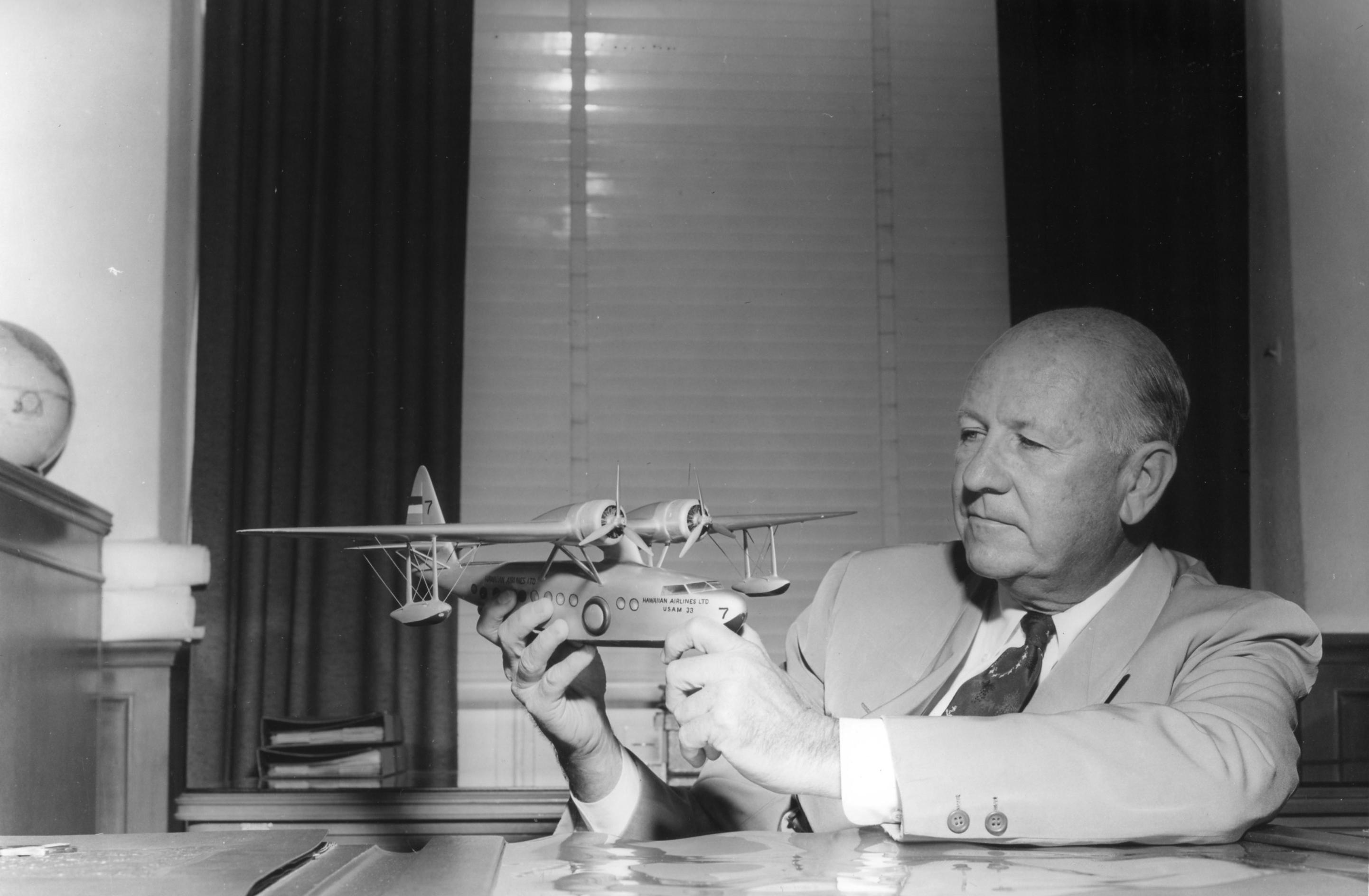
- Photo Courtesy of Hawaiian Airlines Archives
- Born: July 7, 1890; Honolulu, Hawaiian Kingdom
- Died: April 19, 1968 (aged 77); Honolulu, Hawaii, US
- Resting place: Oahu Cemetery
- Education: Stanford University
- Occupations: Founder, President, and Chairman of Hawaiian Airlines
- Years active: 1929–1968
- Spouse: Martha Davenport
- Children: 2
- Military career
- Allegiance: United States
- Branch: United States Navy
- Service years: 1917-1919
- Rank: Ensign
- Conflicts: World War I
- Awards: Citation Star/Silver Star

Stanley Carmichael Kennedy Sr. (July 7, 1890 – April 19, 1968) was a US Naval Aviator during World War I, world record holder and Silver Star recipient, pioneer of commercial aviation in the Hawaiian Islands, and founder of Hawaiian Airlines, one of the world's oldest operating airlines. Kennedy ran Hawaiian Airlines from the time of its incorporation in 1929 until he stepped down from daily operations in 1955. He remained chairman of the board until his death in 1968.

== Early life ==
Kennedy was born in Honolulu, Hawaii to James A. and Minnie C. (Kirkland) Kennedy on July 7, 1890. His father was an immigrant from Scotland who worked his way up to become an executive at the Honolulu Iron Works, and then in 1902 became President of the Inter-Island Steam Navigation Company, which provided passenger and cargo shipping in the Hawaiian Islands. Kennedy attended the Punahou School in Honolulu graduating in 1908, and then attended Stanford University graduating in 1912. He returned to Honolulu to work for his father at Inter-Island Steam Navigation Company.

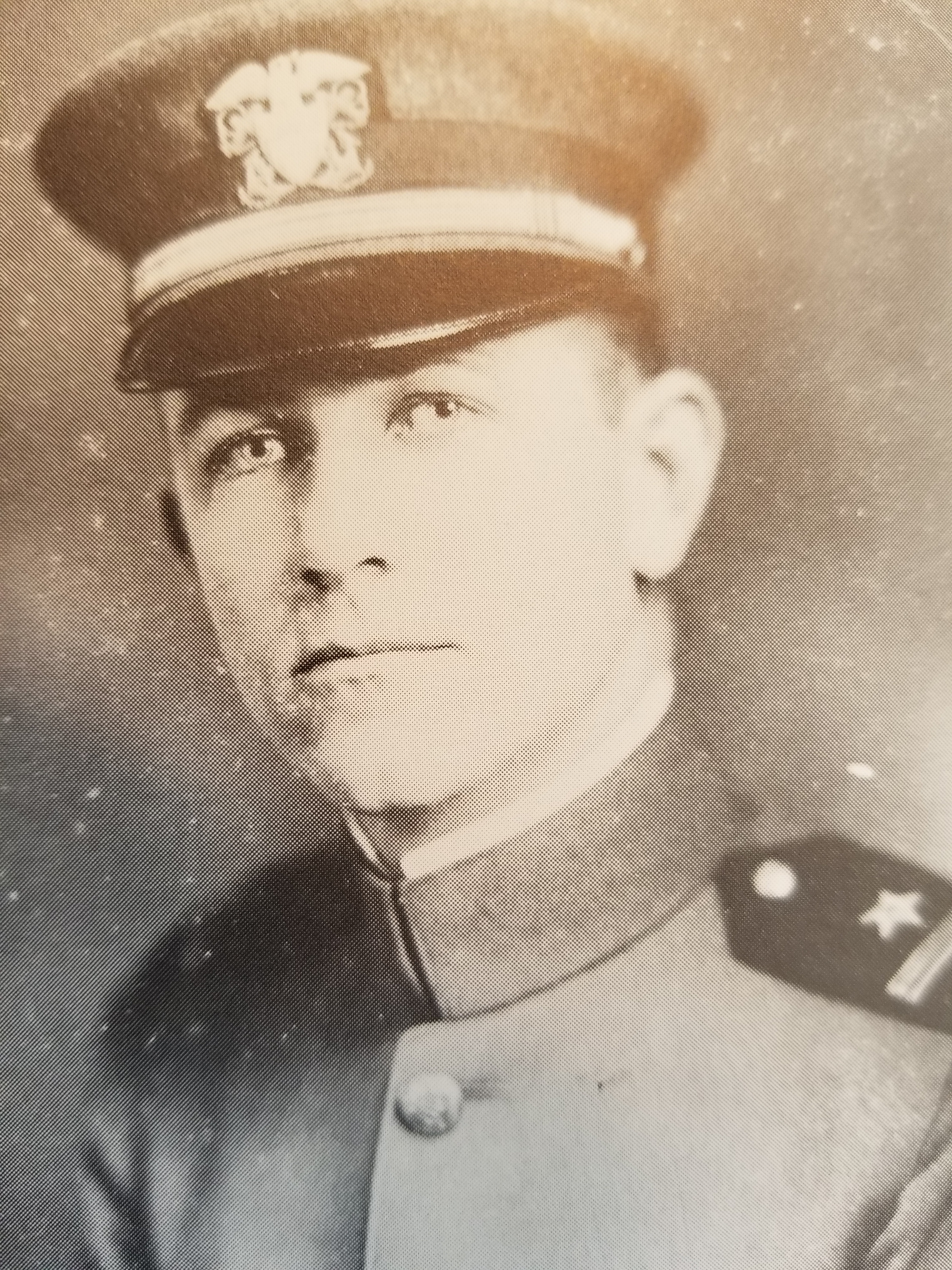
Ensign Stan Kennedy, circa 1917

== Naval career ==
When the United States entered World War I in 1917, Kennedy joined the US Navy on June 27, 1917. He was sent to the Massachusetts Institute of Technology for six weeks of Naval Officer training, and then to Naval Air Station Pensacola to earn his Navy wings. He is listed as Naval Aviator #302.

Ensign Kennedy was stationed in England, flying Curtiss H-16 Seaplanes patrolling the North Sea for German submarines. On one mission, Kennedy and his crew went on patrol for 7 hours and 59 minutes, setting a world record for sustained flight and earning him the Navy's Citation Star/Silver Star.

== Airline career ==
=== Creating Inter-Island Airways ===
Kennedy returned from WWI and resumed his career at the Inter-Island Steam Navigation Company. His experience flying seaplanes led him to the possibility of using seaplanes to connect the people of Hawaii. He approached his father about adding a seaplane division to his company's offerings, but his father saw airplanes as "flying toys" to be used in only good weather.

Shortly after his father's death in 1926, Kennedy's proposal to the company's board of directors was accepted, and on January 30, 1929, Inter-Island Airways became a legal entity with Kennedy appointed vice president and general manager. Inter-Island Steam's Board Member F.C. Atherton was appointed president to oversee their investment of $300,000.

The first employees Kennedy hired were Navy pilot Charles Elliott as Chief Pilot and Army pilot Carl Cover as Operations Manager. Kennedy, Cover, and Elliott, all being WWI veterans, decided on Armistice Day (November 11) to be the inaugural flight in the Sikorsky S-38 amphibious airplanes. On November 11, 1929, Kennedy's dream of scheduled airline service in the Hawaiian Islands took flight as Elliott and Cover flew the two Sikorsky's in formation from Honolulu to Maui, then on to Hilo.

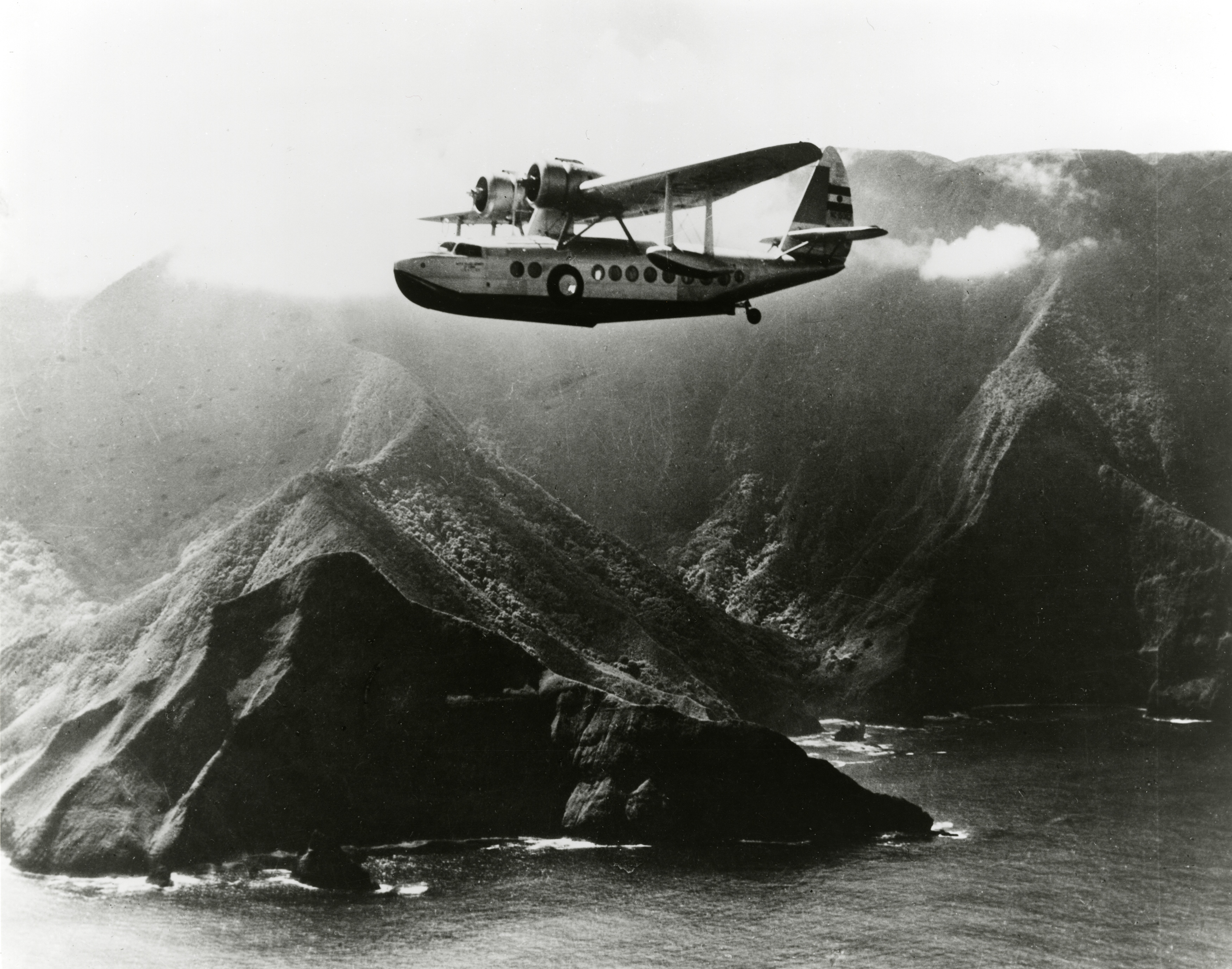
Inter-Islands Airways Sikorsky S-43 in Molokai

Starting an airline the month after the Wall Street Crash of 1929, was a daunting task. However, the Board of Directors had great faith in Kennedy, making him the President of both Inter-Island Steam Navigation and Inter-Island Airways in February 1933. The airline lost money for the first 5 years, until Kennedy was able to secure the airmail contract starting on October 8, 1934. This allowed Kennedy to start looking for larger airplanes to operate, and 10 days after the maiden airmail flight he decided on the Sikorsky S-43, making Inter-Island Airways the launch customer for this new aircraft.

=== Expanding beyond the islands ===
Kennedy now aimed at expanding Inter-Island Airways to fly to the US mainland. To represent this, on October 1, 1941, Kennedy changed the airline's name to Hawaiian Airlines. In 1943, the Civil Aeronautics Board (CAB) released a route for application from Honolulu to San Francisco with a stopover in Los Angeles. Kennedy and TWA's president, Jack Frye, teamed up on the petition where Hawaiian would fly the routes, TWA would withdraw its application in exchange for 20% ownership of Hawaiian Airlines. Kennedy spent a great deal of time and money traveling to Washington, D.C. arguing Hawaiian's case to the CAB, but since Pacific Overseas Airline submitted they didn't get a chance at the application, the CAB decided to start the entire application process over again, but it was too expensive for Kennedy to attempt once more.

The route application process resurfaced in 1959, after Kennedy had handed over the Presidency to Art Lewis, but remained on as chairman of the board. This time Hawaiian was flying DC-6s to the mainland on charters, and felt they had an excellent chance to win the route. Once again to no avail, the route was awarded to Western Airlines. Kennedy would never get to see his airline fly to the mainland on a scheduled basis, as Hawaiian would have to wait until the Airline Deregulation Act of 1978.

=== First scheduled air-cargo service in the US ===
After the Attack on Pearl Harbor in 1941, Territorial Governor Joseph Poindexter evoked Martial law in Hawaii. The War Shipping Administration took control of all Inter-Island Steam Navigation's ships, but allowed Hawaiian Airlines to operate under the Army's supervision. The ships that used to supply the islands with its consumer goods, were now devoted to transporting soldiers, munitions, and other war supplies throughout the islands. Kennedy petitioned the CAB to allow Hawaiian to fly these consumer goods on its airplanes, and was granted United States Air Cargo Certificate #1. Hawaiian removed the seats of its three remaining S-43s and lone remaining S-38 to use for cargo flights, allowing its DC-3s to fly the passengers. On March 20, 1942, Kennedy watched as Hawaiian's first air-cargo flight departed to serve the people of Hawaii.

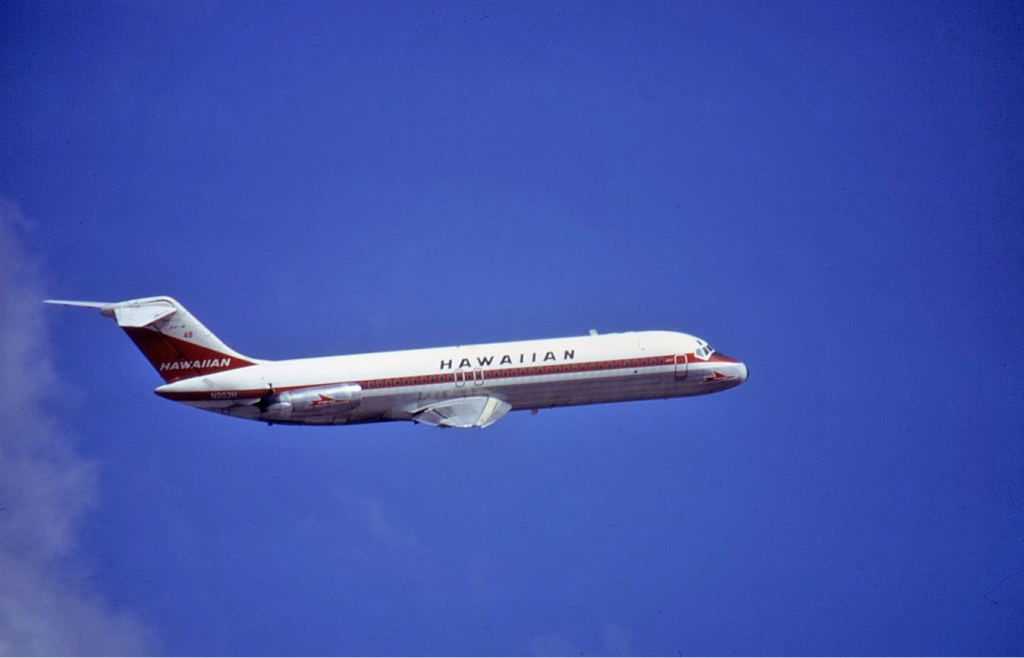
Hawaiian Air DC-9 in flight

=== Jet service ===
On April 1, 1966, Kennedy witnessed the final large milestone of his tenure at Hawaiian, the introduction of DC-9 jets for the inter-island service. During Kennedy's oversight of Hawaiian, he had grown it from a fledgling airline flying 8-seat seaplanes to an airline flying a fleet of modern jet airliners.

== Inter-Island Steam Navigation Company ==
Kennedy was president of the Inter-Island Steam Navigation Company from February 1933, until it ceased operations in 1947. After WWII, Hawaiian Airlines had both a well established inter-island passenger and air-cargo business. Aloha Airlines began inter-island passenger service in 1946, creating more available seats and fierce competition. The 14 hour overnight steamer voyage from Honolulu to Hilo became an outdated form of transportation, when people and cargo could fly there in an hour and a half.

== Personal life ==
After Kennedy returned home from Stanford, he met Martha Davenport on an Inter-Island steamer while she was vacationing in Hawaii from her home in Chattanooga, Tennessee. They wrote to each other after that vacation, and continued during WWI. On his way home after the war, Kennedy stopped in Chattanooga to marry Martha, and then the two continued to Honolulu together. They lived in a beachfront home near Aina Haina, just east of Honolulu, and had a weekend home in Kahuku, on the North Shore of Oahu.

Kennedy was also president of the Coca-Cola Bottling Co. of Hawaii, as well as the Honolulu Chamber of Commerce.

== Death ==
Kennedy died of a heart attack April 19, 1968 at his Kahuku beachfront home at the age of 77, ending his tenure as Hawaiian Airline's chairman of the board. He is buried at the Oahu Cemetery in Nuuanu.
