= Mary Robinson Foster =

Hawaiian philanthropist

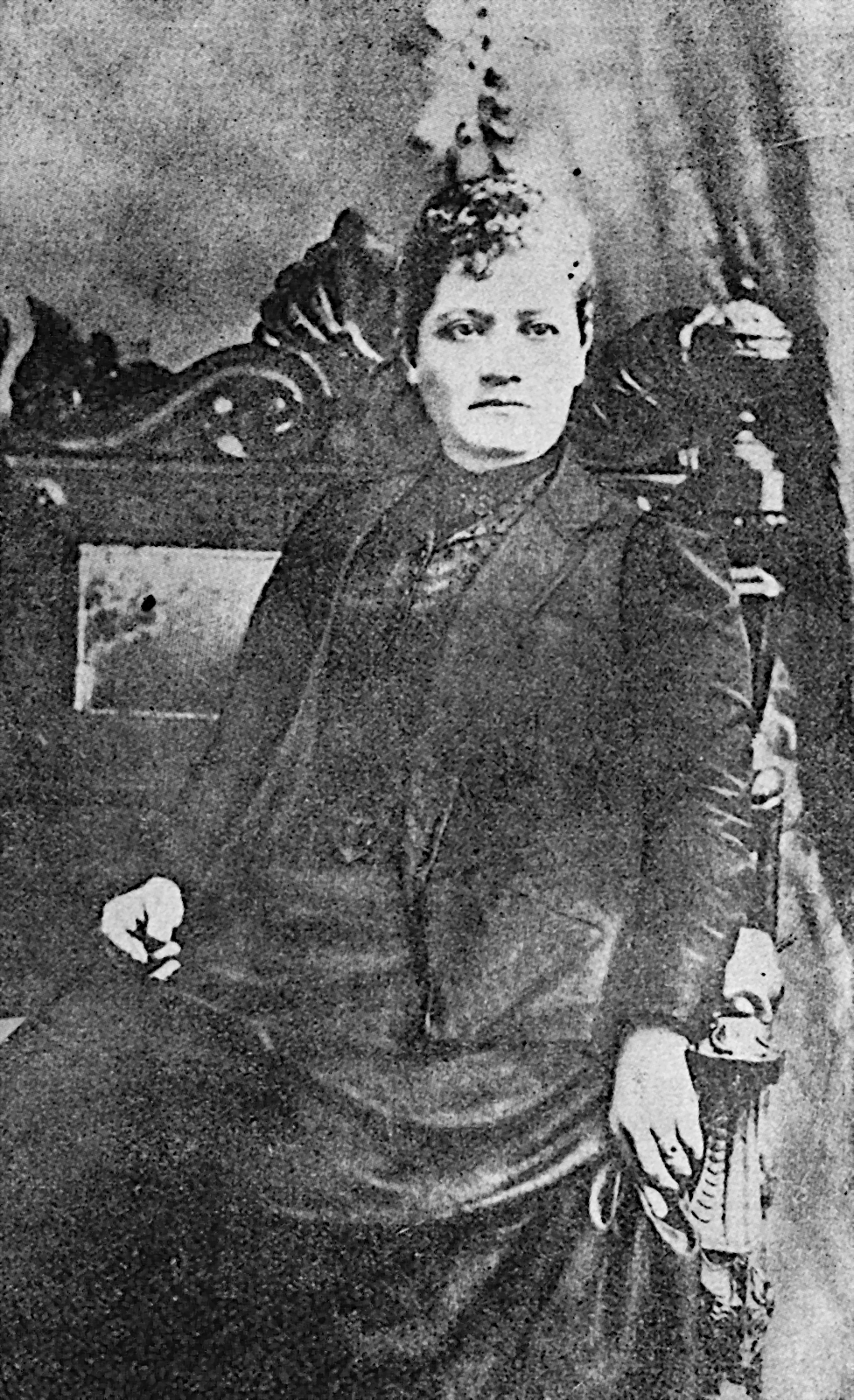
Mary Foster in later life

Mary Elizabeth Mikahala Robinson Foster (September 20, 1844 – December 29, 1930) was a Hawaiian philanthropist and known as the first Hawaiian Buddhist. On her death, she donated her substantial gardens to the city of Honolulu, and they later became the Foster Botanical Garden.

== Early life and background ==
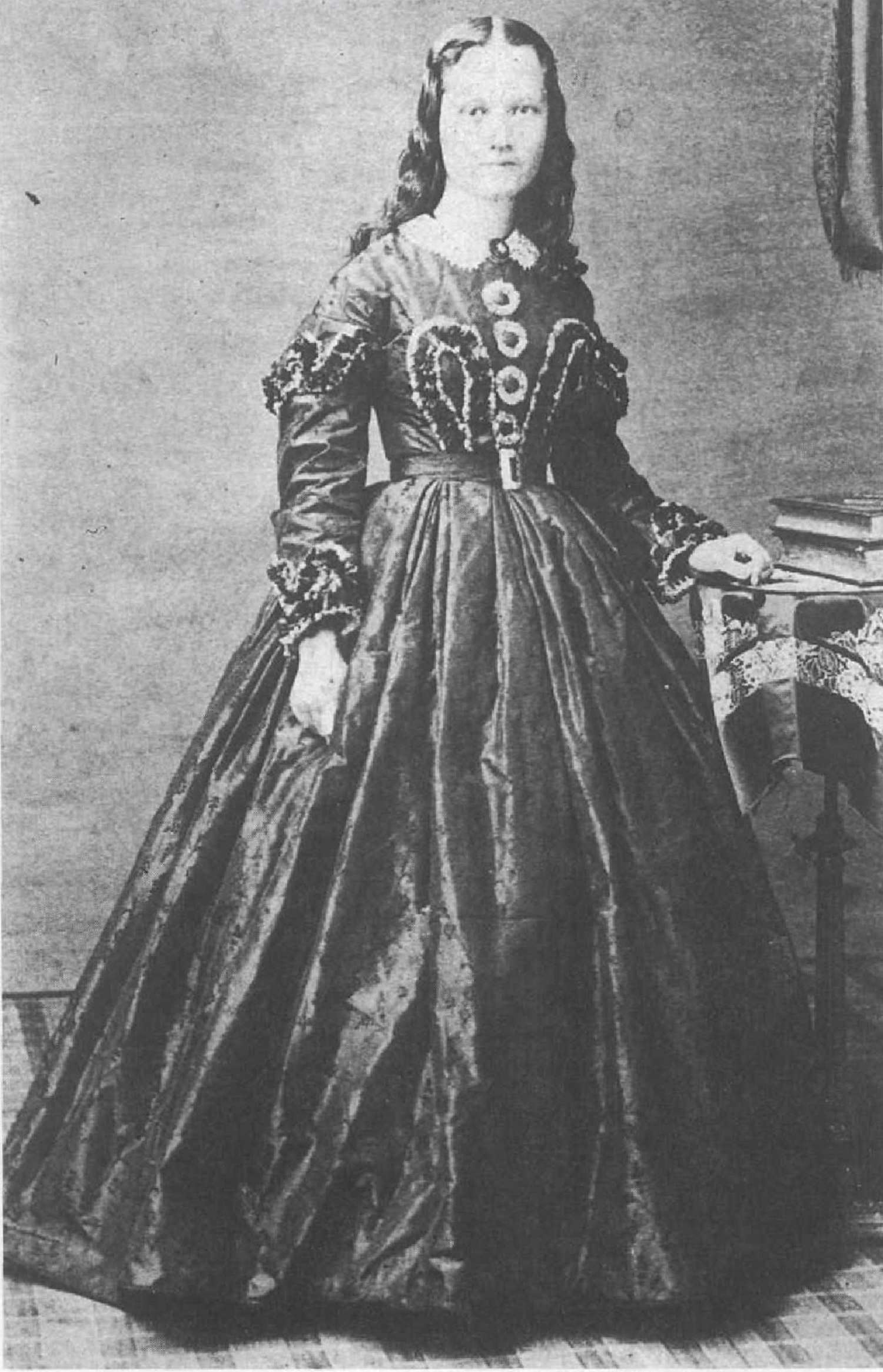
Mary Foster in her youth

Foster was born in 1844 and grew up in Nu‘uanu on Oahu, Hawai‘i, where she attended the Oahu Charity School. She was the eldest of the nine children of Rebecca Prever and John James Robinson. Her mother had French ancestry and Hawaiian ancestry that dates back to ali‘i (chiefs) from Maui and Hawai‘i Island. Her father was British and founded a large shipbuilding company. Her brother was politician and businessman Mark P. Robinson.

When she was 16 years old, she married Thomas R. Foster, who worked for her father's business. In 1884 the couple bought William Hillebrand's property, which Foster later donated for public gardens, and began developing the plant collections. Five years later, in 1889, Foster's husband died, leaving her widowed and childless at the age of 45.

In 1893, her good friend Queen Lili‘uokalani was overthrown by American soldiers and imprisoned at 'Iolani Palace. Foster was one of two people who were permitted to visit her during her imprisonment.

== Career and later life ==
In March 1893, she was elected as an honorary president of Hui Aloha ʻĀina o Na Wahine (Hawaiian Women's Patriotic League) or Hui Aloha ʻĀina for Women. This patriotic group was founded shortly after its male counterpart the Hui Aloha ʻĀina for Men to oppose the overthrow and plans to annex the islands to the United States and to support the deposed queen. She resigned this position on April 17, 1893, after a dispute arose between two factions of the group over the wording to the memorial seeking the restoration of the monarchy to be presented to the United States Commissioner James Henderson Blount sent by President Grover Cleveland to investigate the overthrow.

Later the same year, she met Anagarika Dharmapala, a Sri Lankan Buddhist and activist who was travelling back to Sri Lanka from the United States. He hoped that she would support his fundraising efforts to return the Mahabodhi Temple in Bodh Gaya, India, where the Buddha is believed to have gained enlightenment, to Buddhist ownership. At their initial meeting, Foster shared her grief over her husband's death, and her anger and pain at the treatment of her friend Queen Lili‘uokalani; in response, Dharmapala taught her the principles of Buddhist meditation and began a lifelong interest in Buddhism for Foster. Over the next 40 years, Foster donated significant amounts of money to Dharmapala's Mahabodhi Society, which were used to support Sri Lankans in need as well as to negotiate for the ownership of Mahabodhi Temple. One of her projects, the Foster-Robinson Hospital for the Poor, is still part of the National Hospital of Sri Lanka in Colombo.

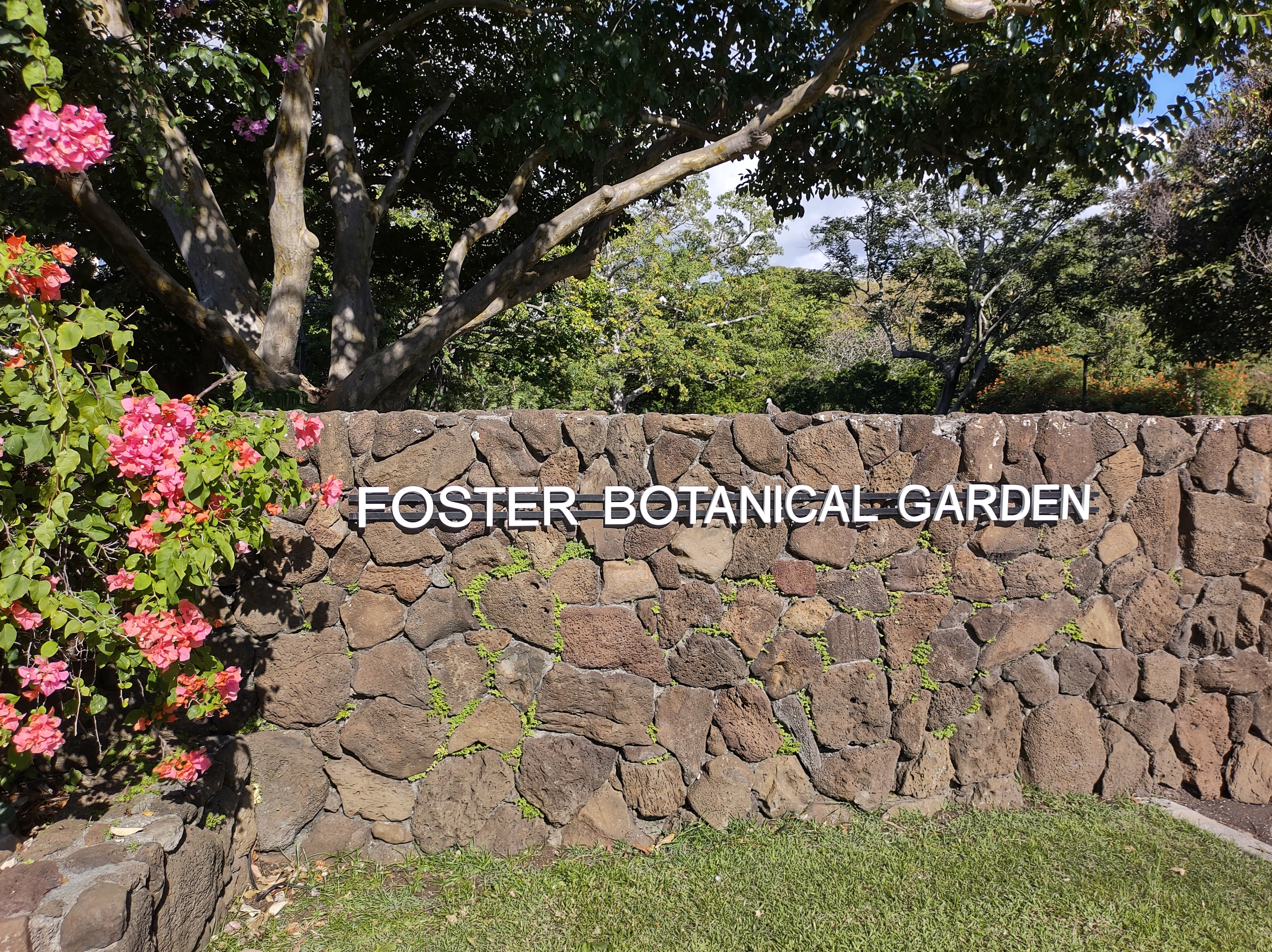
Foster Botanical Garden

In Hawai‘i Foster was also a generous benefactor. She donated land along Pali Highway for the building of the Honpa Hongwanji Mission, the first Buddhist temple in Honolulu. She also supported Hongwanji High School, funded scholarships at Kamehameha Schools, purchased beds at Kap‘iolani Hospital for indigent patients, and acquired land that would otherwise have been purchased by foreign investors, enabling native Hawaiians to live there.

Foster died on December 30, 1930, and bequeathed her gardens and home to the city of Honolulu as a public garden, which later became the Foster Botanical Garden.

== Legacy ==
Apart from Foster Botanical Garden in Honolulu and the Foster Robinson Free Ayurvedic Clinic in Narahenpita, Foster Lane, in Colombo 7, commemorates her. The Anagarika Dharmapala Trust celebrates her birthday every year, in accordance with Dharmapala's will.

== Sources ==
- Silva, Noenoe K. (1998). "The 1897 Petitions Protesting Annexation". The Annexation Of Hawaii: A Collection Of Document. University of Hawaii at Manoa. Archived from the original on December 30, 2016.
