= Thomas R. Foster =

- Born: 1835; Fisher's Grant, Nova Scotia, Canada
- Died: August 20, 1889 (aged 53–54); San Francisco, California, US
- Occupations: Shipbuilder and founder of Inter-Island Steam Navigation Company
- Spouse: Mary Robinson Foster
- Children: 0

Thomas R. Foster (1835 – August 20, 1889) was the founder of the Inter-Island Steam Navigation Company. Inter-Island became the largest passenger and cargo steamship operator in the Hawaiian Islands and the parent company of Inter-Island Airways, which later changed its name to Hawaiian Airlines. Foster's home and land were donated to the city of Honolulu, and is now the Foster Botanical Garden.

== Shipbuilding ==
Foster was a shipbuilder in Canada who moved to Honolulu, Hawaii, in 1857. He found employment with shipbuilder John Robinson and married his daughter Mary Robinson in 1861.

== Inter-Island Steam Navigation Company ==
On February 7, 1883, Captain Foster incorporated the Inter-Island Steam Navigation Company. Some of the company's early ships included the SS James Makee, SS Planter, SS C.R. Bishop, SS Iwalani, and the SS Helene. After the acquisition of the Wilder Steamship Company in 1905, Inter-Island became the largest steamship company in the Hawaiian Islands. In 1929, Inter-Island Steam Navigation incorporated a subsidiary, Inter-Island Airways which changed its name to Hawaiian Airlines in 1941.

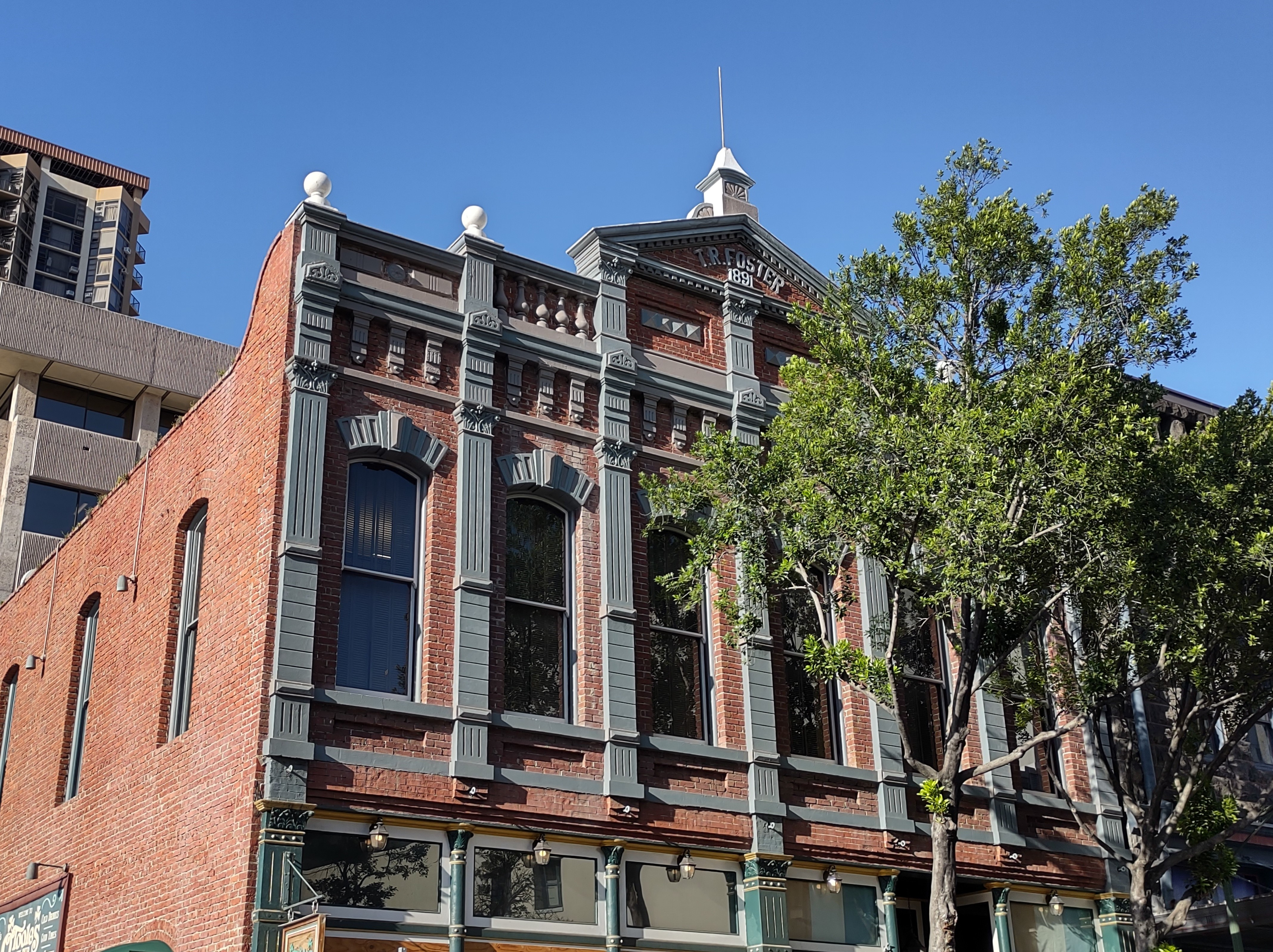
T.R. Foster Building

=== T.R. Foster Building ===
In 1891, shortly after Foster's death, Inter-Island erected the T.R. Foster building at the intersection of Nuuanu Avenue and Merchant Street in the heart of Honolulu's Merchant Square. The T.R. Foster Building was originally used as a warehouse, but currently houses a bar and restaurant.

== Foster Botanical Garden ==
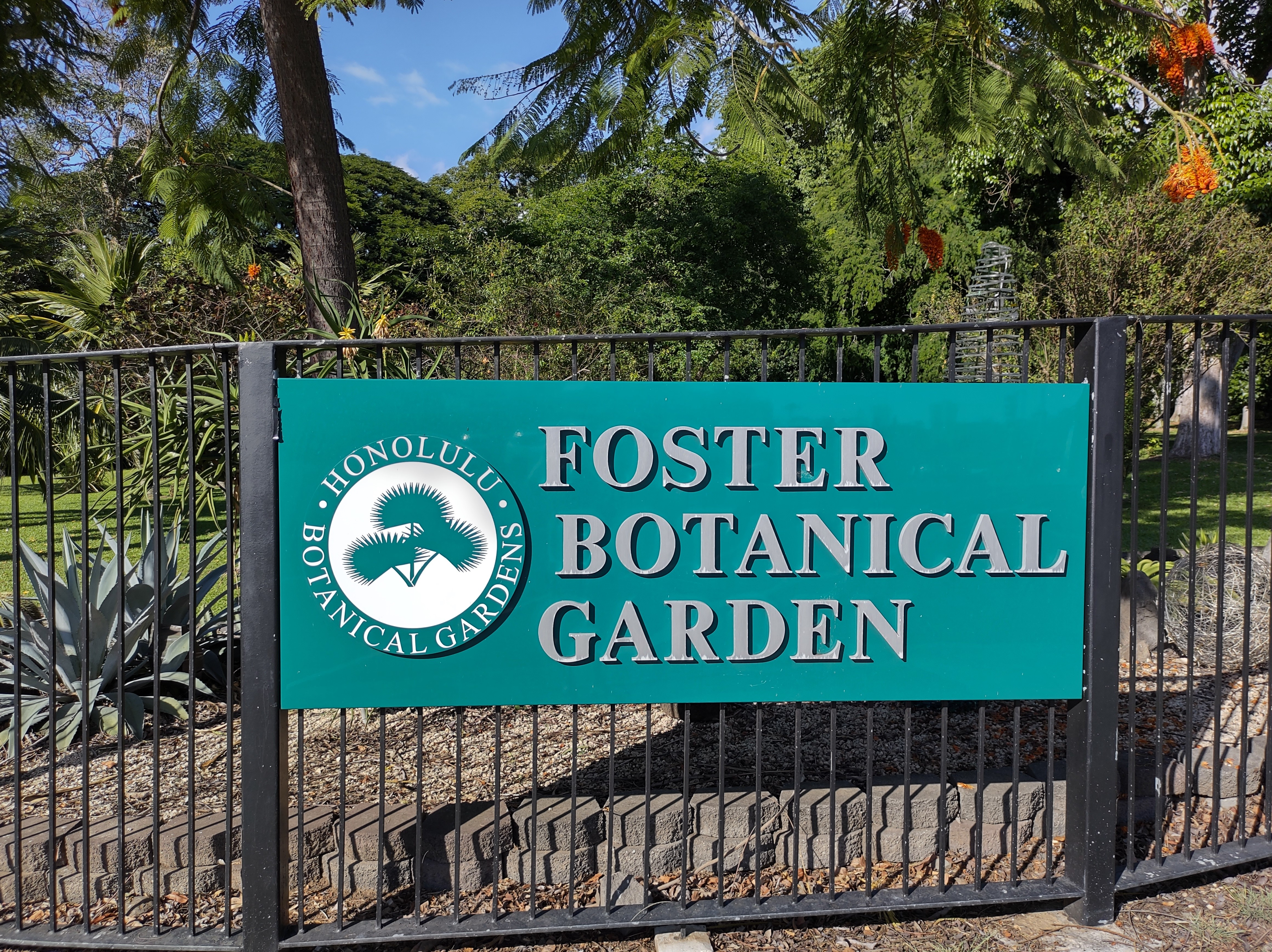
Foster Botanical Garden

Foster lived next door to botanist Dr. William Hillebrand, who had come to Hawaii from Germany for his own health. Hillebrand grew a beautiful garden at his home and published the book Flora of the Hawaiian Islands after he returned to Germany in 1884. Foster bought Hillebrand's home and gardens and continued to cultivate them with his wife Mary. After Foster's death in 1889, Mary continued to care for the gardens until her death in 1930. Mary gave the gardens to the city of Honolulu with the stipulation it would be named "Foster Botanical Garden".

== Death ==
Foster died on August 20, 1889, at the age of 54 while on a trip to San Francisco.
