= Wildlife of Cambodia =

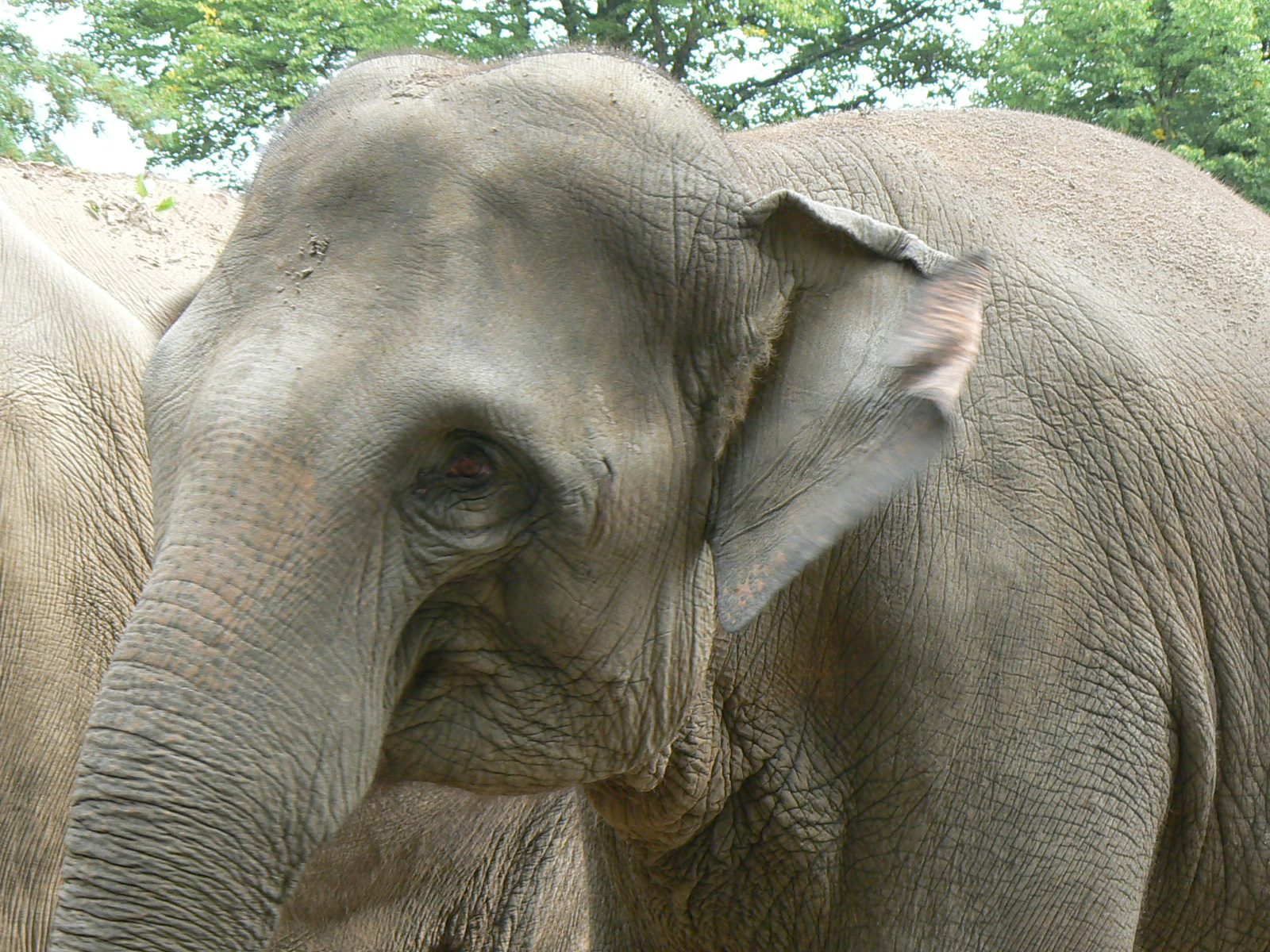
Asian elephant

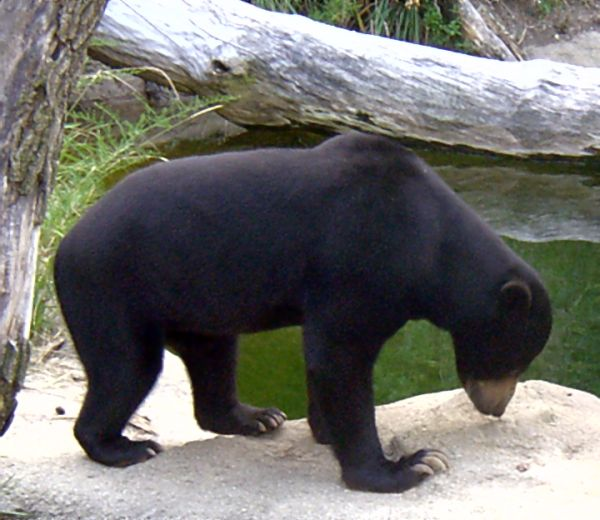
Sun bear

The wildlife of Cambodia is very diverse with at least 162 mammal species, 600 bird species, 176 reptile species (including 89 subspecies), 900 freshwater fish species, 670 invertebrate species, and more than 3000 plant species. A single protected area, Keo Seima Wildlife Sanctuary, is known to support more than 950 total species, including 75 species that are listed as globally threatened on the IUCN Red List. An unknown amount of species remains to be described by science, especially the insect group of butterflies and moths, collectively known as lepidopterans.

Many species in Cambodia, including several endemic ones, are recognized by the IUCN or World Conservation Union as threatened, endangered, or critically endangered due to deforestation and habitat destruction, poaching, the illegal wildlife trade, and farming, fishing, and forestry concessions. Intensive poaching may have already driven Cambodia's national animal, the kouprey, to extinction, wild tigers to extirpation, and Eld's deer, wild water buffaloes and hog deer are at critically low numbers. The giant ibis, Cambodia's national bird, is also critically endangered.

Wildlife in Cambodia includes dholes, elephants, deer (sambar, Eld's deer, hog deer and muntjac), wild oxen (banteng and gaur), panthers, bears, and tigers. Cormorants, cranes, ibises, parrots, green peafowl, pheasants, and wild ducks are also found, and species of venomous snakes and constrictors are numerous. Deforestation, mining activities, and unregulated hunting, have diminished the country's wildlife diversity rapidly.

Cambodia also has many endangered species, including the Asian elephant, Siamese crocodile, wild water buffalo, and the Germain's silver langur.

Much work is being done in this area to help conserve and protect Cambodia's unique wildlife. Wildlife conservation organizations operating in Cambodia include Conservation International, World Wildlife Fund, the Wildlife Conservation Society, Fauna and Flora International, BirdLife International, Wildlife Alliance, and many others. On 20 December 2016, 163 new animal species were reported in Southeast Asia including one known as the Klingon newt for its resemblance to a Klingon from Star Trek.

== Fauna ==
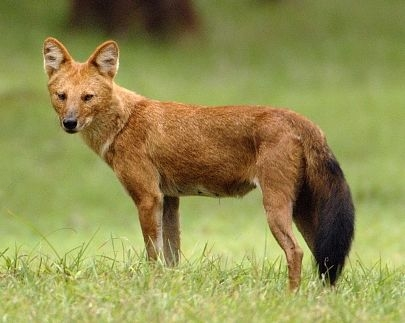
Dhole

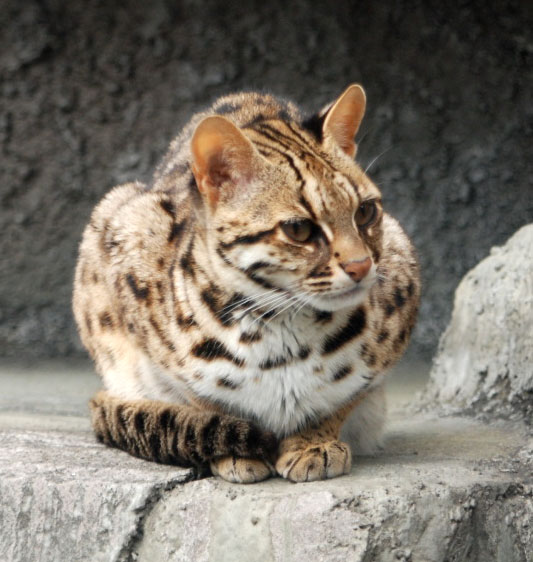
Leopard cat

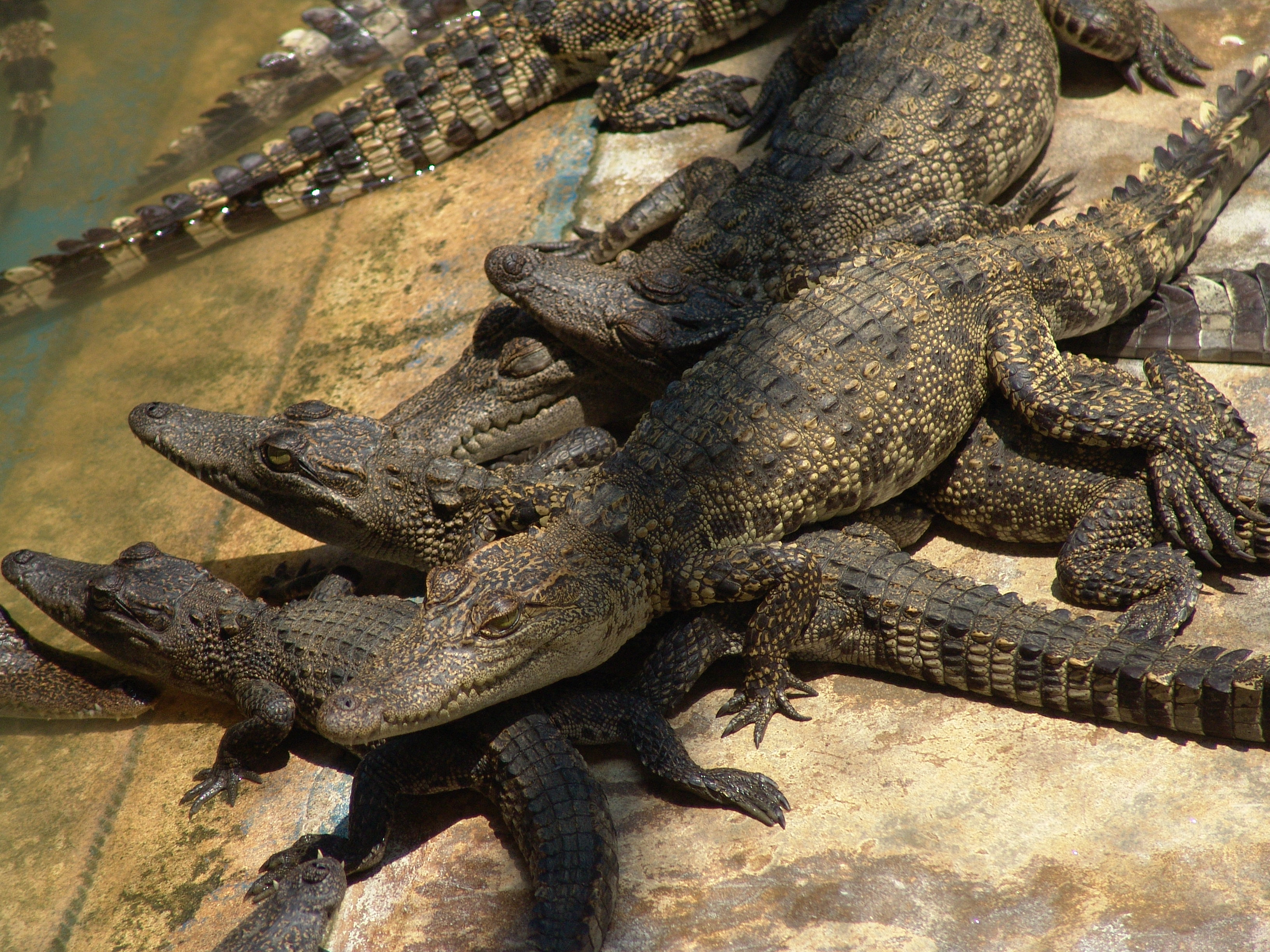
Siamese crocodiles

=== Tonlé Sap Lake ===
The Tonlé Sap Great Lake is the largest natural freshwater lake in Southeast Asia and a key component of Cambodia's biodiversity. Linked to the Mekong River by the 120-kilometre Tonlé Sap River, the lake expands dramatically during the annual monsoon flood pulse from around 2,500 km² in the dry season to as much as 10,000–16,000 km² in the wet season, generating exceptionally productive fish habitat. The lake has recorded at least 149 fish species and hosts globally significant colonies of endangered waterbirds. Prek Toal on the lake's northwestern shore is the only remaining breeding site in Southeast Asia for two globally threatened species, the Spot-billed Pelican and the Milky Stork. The Tonlé Sap floodplain also supports more than half of the global population of the critically endangered Bengal Florican.

Some animals native to Cambodia:

=== Mammals ===
- Asian black bear
- Asian elephant
- Asian golden cat
- Banteng - endangered
- Binturong - vulnerable
- Clouded leopard
- Dhole
- Douc langur
- Eld's deer
- Gaur - vulnerable
- Hog badger - vulnerable
- Hog deer
- Indian muntjac
- Irrawaddy dolphin - critically endangered (Mekong subpopulation), approximately 111 individuals recorded in Cambodia as of May 2025
- Kouprey - critically endangered (possibly extinct); national animal of Cambodia
- Leopard cat
- Lesser false vampire bat
- Marbled cat
- Pileated gibbon - endangered
- Rice-field rat
- Sambar deer
- Serow
- Silvery lutung
- Sun bear
- Wild boar
- Wild water buffalo - endangered

=== Reptiles ===
- Asiatic softshell turtle
- Batagur baska
- Bengal monitor
- Blood python
- Burmese python
- Cantor's giant soft-shelled turtle
- Green sea turtle
- Hawksbill turtle
- Indotestudo elongata
- Leatherback sea turtle - vulnerable
- Manouria emys
- Pelochelys cantorii
- Ramphotyphlops braminus
- Reticulated python
- Saltwater crocodile
- Siamese crocodile - critically endangered active captive-breeding and wild-release programmes are underway, with over 200 individuals released in Cambodia's Cardamom Mountains region since 2000.
- Water monitor
- Golden flying snake
- Asian vine snake
- Long-nosed whip snake
- Many-spotted cat snake
- Mangrove snake
- Dog-toothed cat snake
- Green cat snake
- Kukri snakes
- Radiated ratsnake
- White-lipped pit viper
- Large-eyed pit viper
- Mountain pit viper
- Malayan pit viper
- Russell's viper
- Monocled cobra
- Indochinese spitting cobra
- King cobra - vulnerable
- Banded krait
- Malayan krait
- Red-headed krait
- Red-tailed pipe snake
- Sunbeam snake
- Little file snake
- Elephant trunk snake
- Asian coral snakes
- Tentacled snake
- Sea snake
- Sea krait

=== Fish ===
- Asian arowana - endangered
- Barbus sp.
- Botia sp.
- Channa sp. (snakehead fishes)
- Danio sp.
- Labeo sp.
- Mekong freshwater stingray
- Mekong giant catfish - critically endangered
- Pangasius sp. (catfishes)
- Pangio sp. (kuhli loach)
- Rasbora sp.
- Trichogaster sp.

=== Insects ===
There are several species of insects in Cambodia still undescribed by science.

- Blue ant (an undescribed species of Leptogenys ants)

Only preliminary research has been done on butterflies and moths (lepidopterans) in Cambodia, even though it is an abundant lifeform in the country. No identification literature exists for Cambodia on this group yet.

- Indian moon moth (Actias selene), a common moth across Asia
- Common evening brown butterfly (Melanitis leda), common in Cambodian woodlands
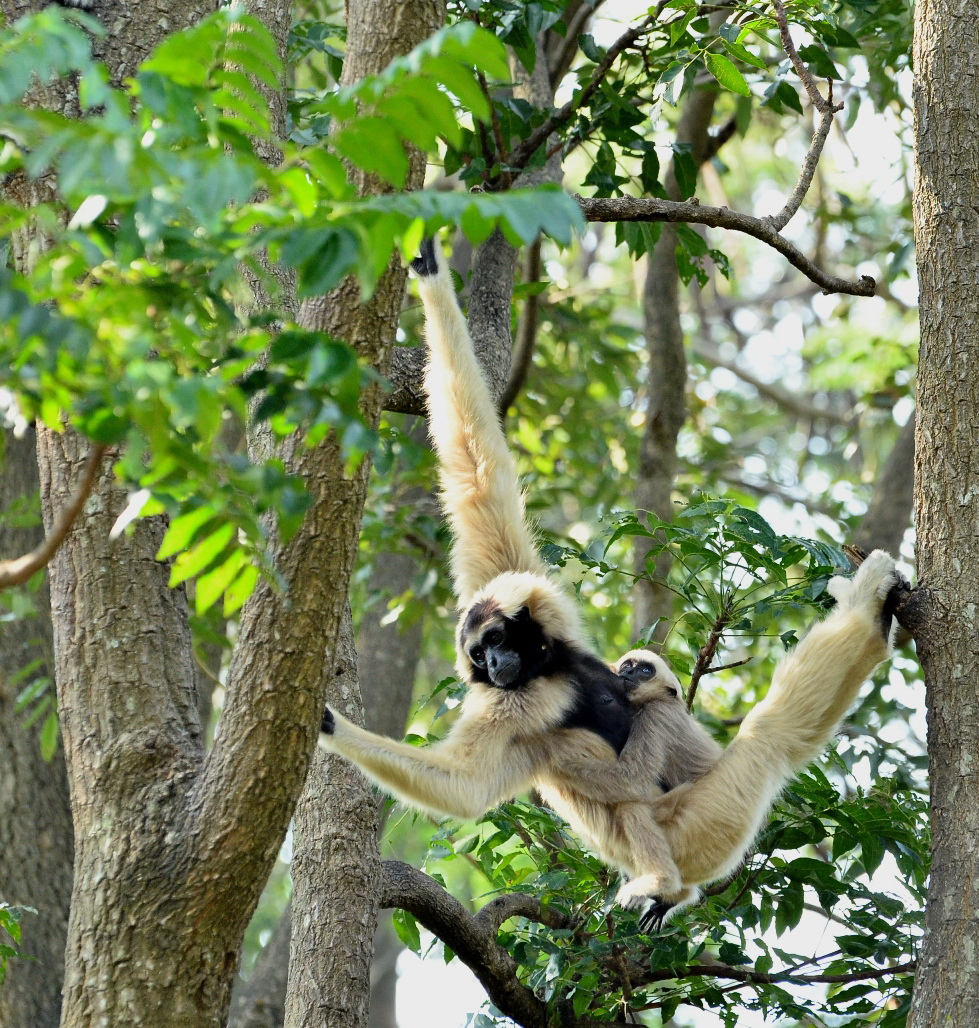
Pileated gibbon.
Cambodia has the largest population in the world of this endangered ape.

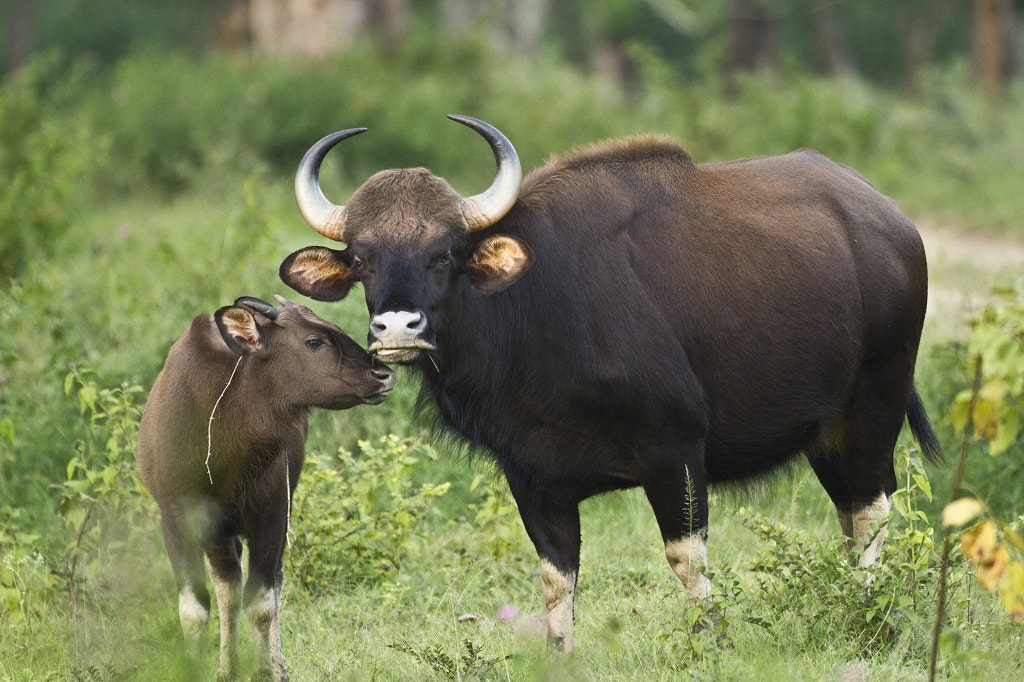
Gaur

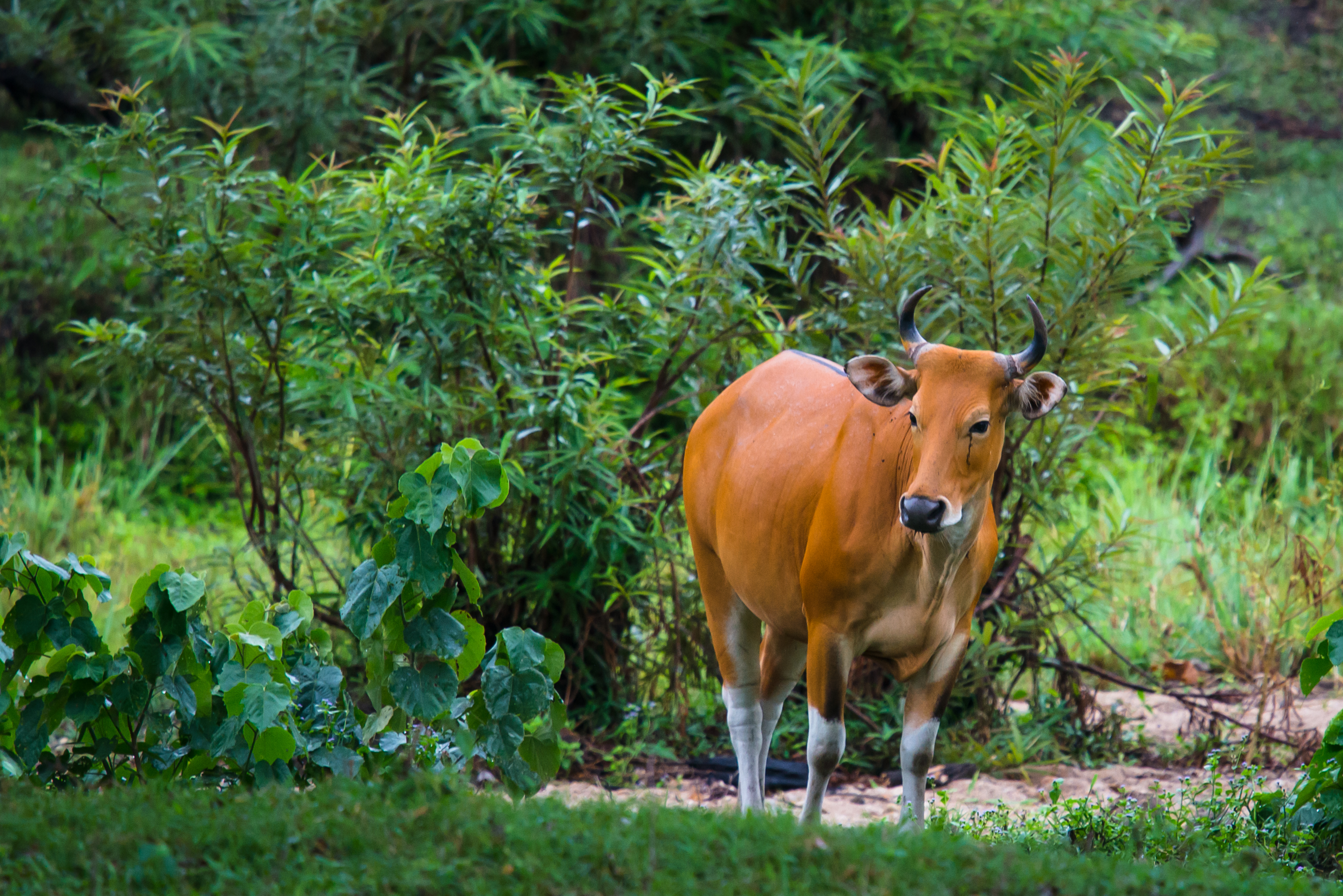
Banteng

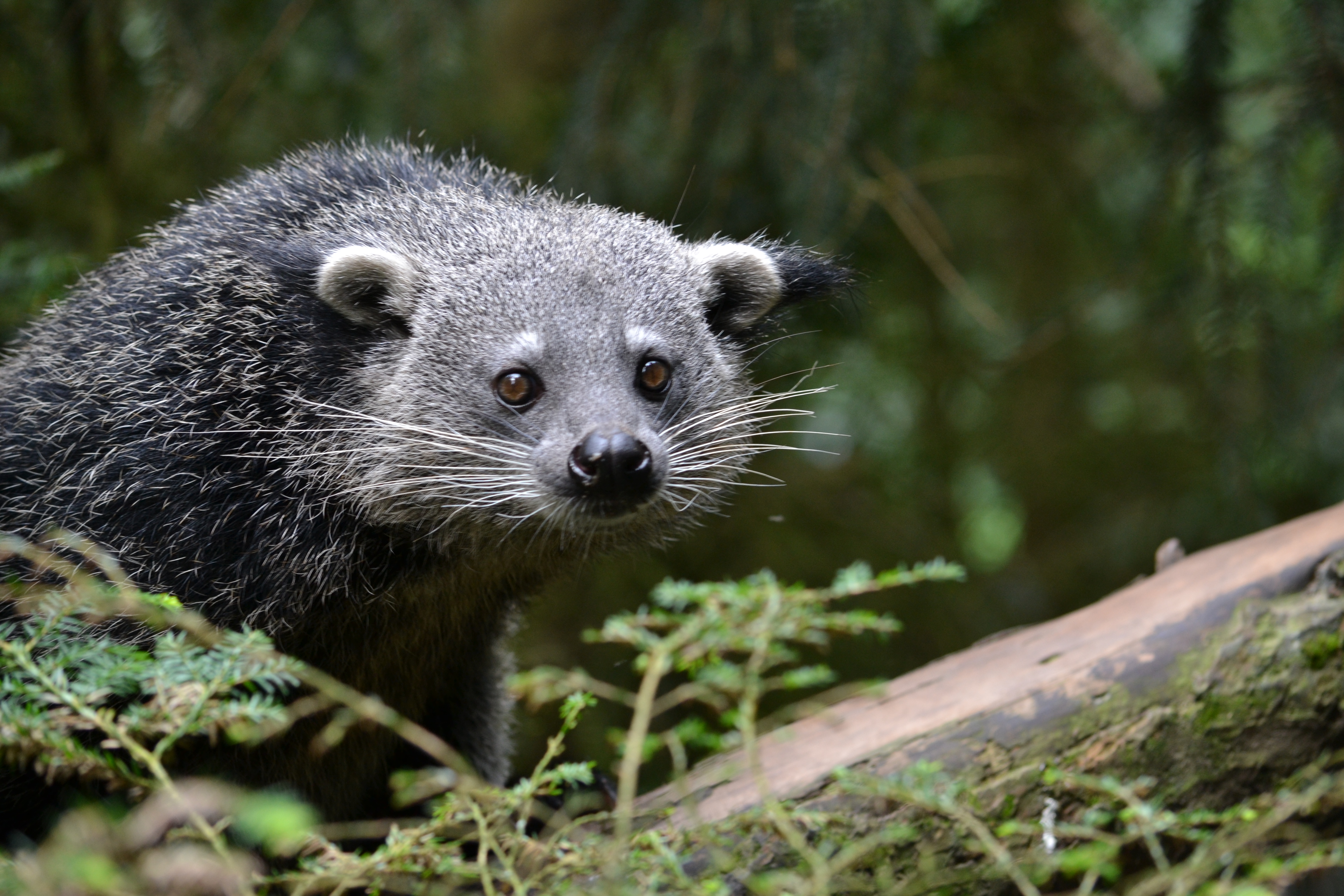
Binturong (bearcat)

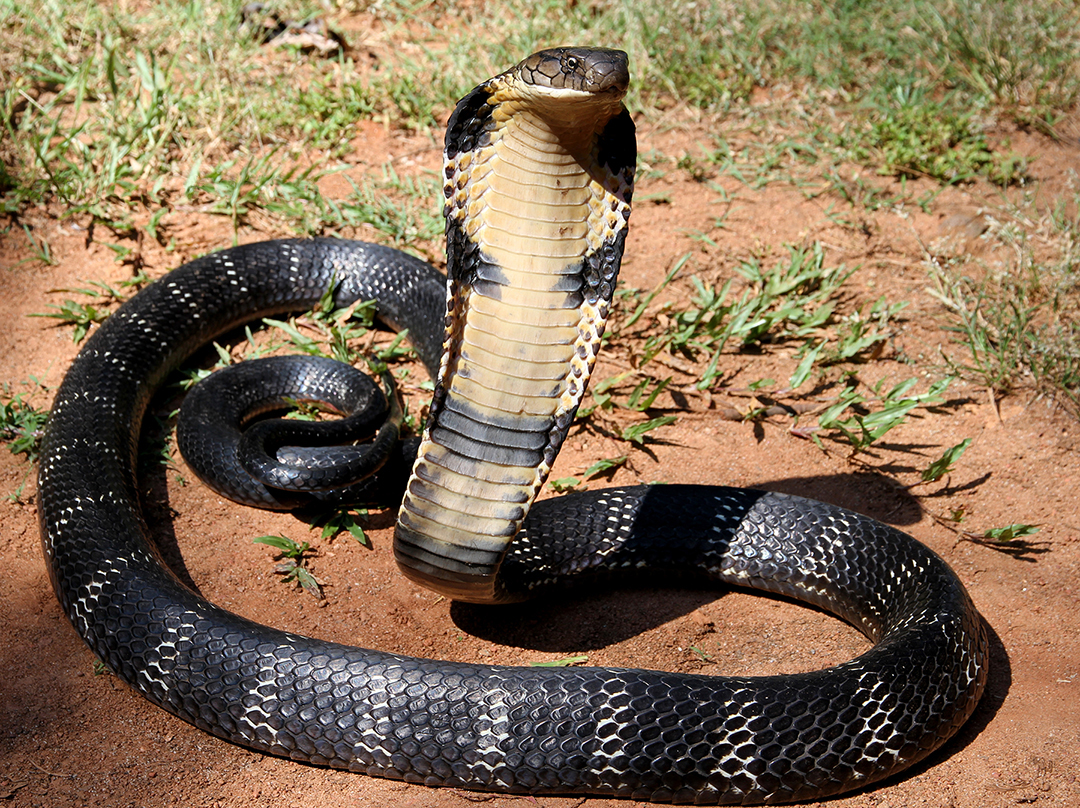
King cobra.
Cambodia has many different kinds of snakes.

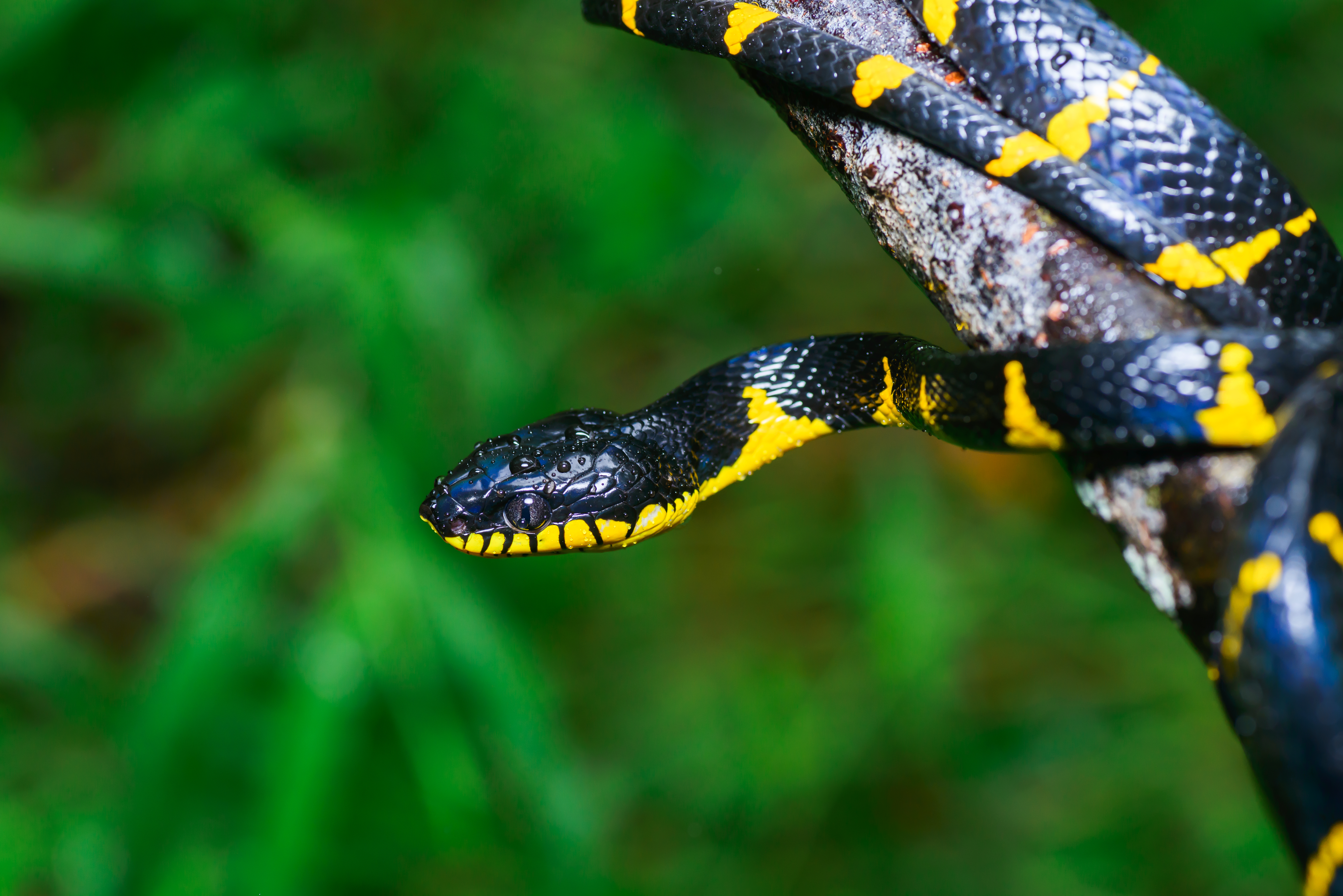
Mangrove snake

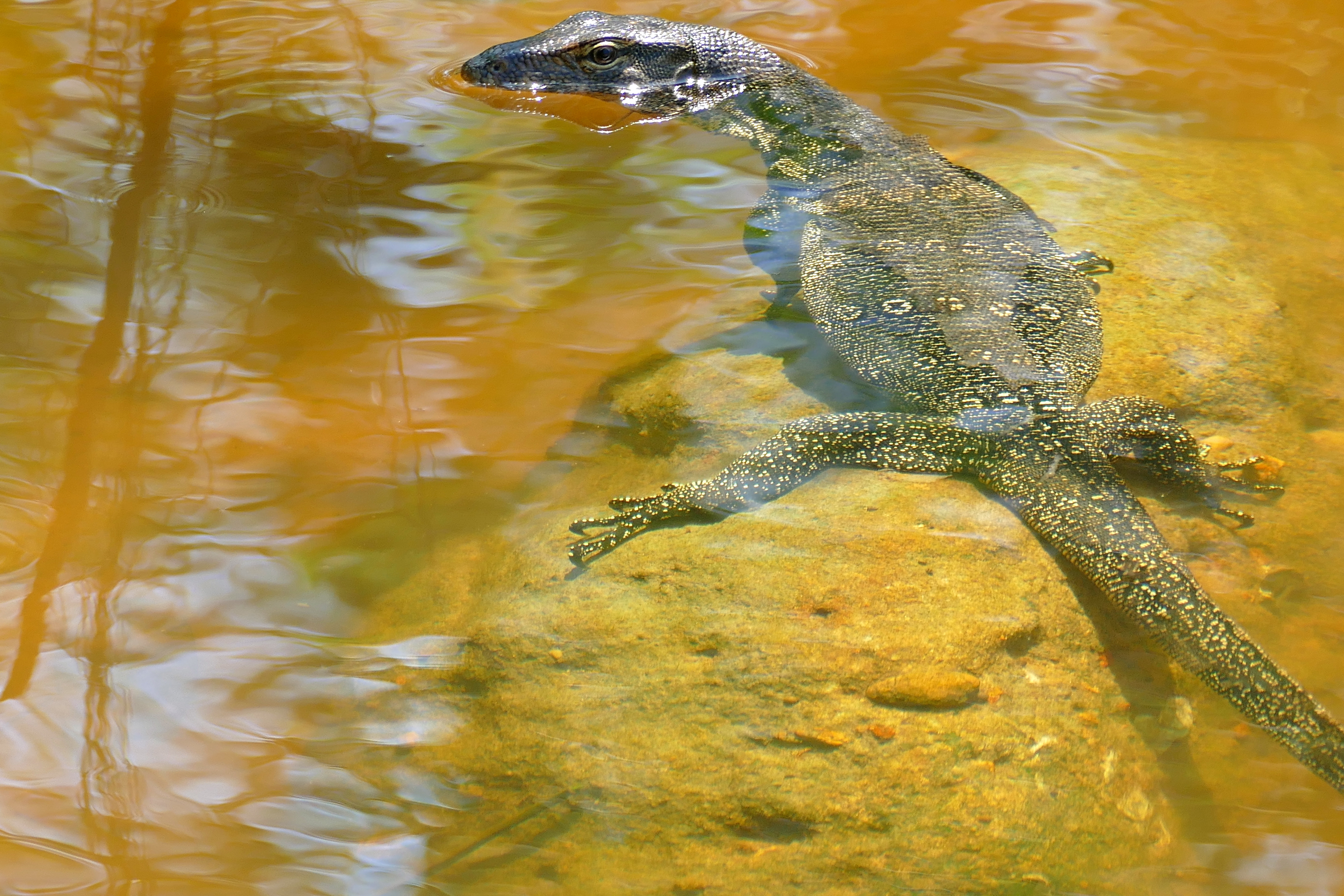
Asian water monitor

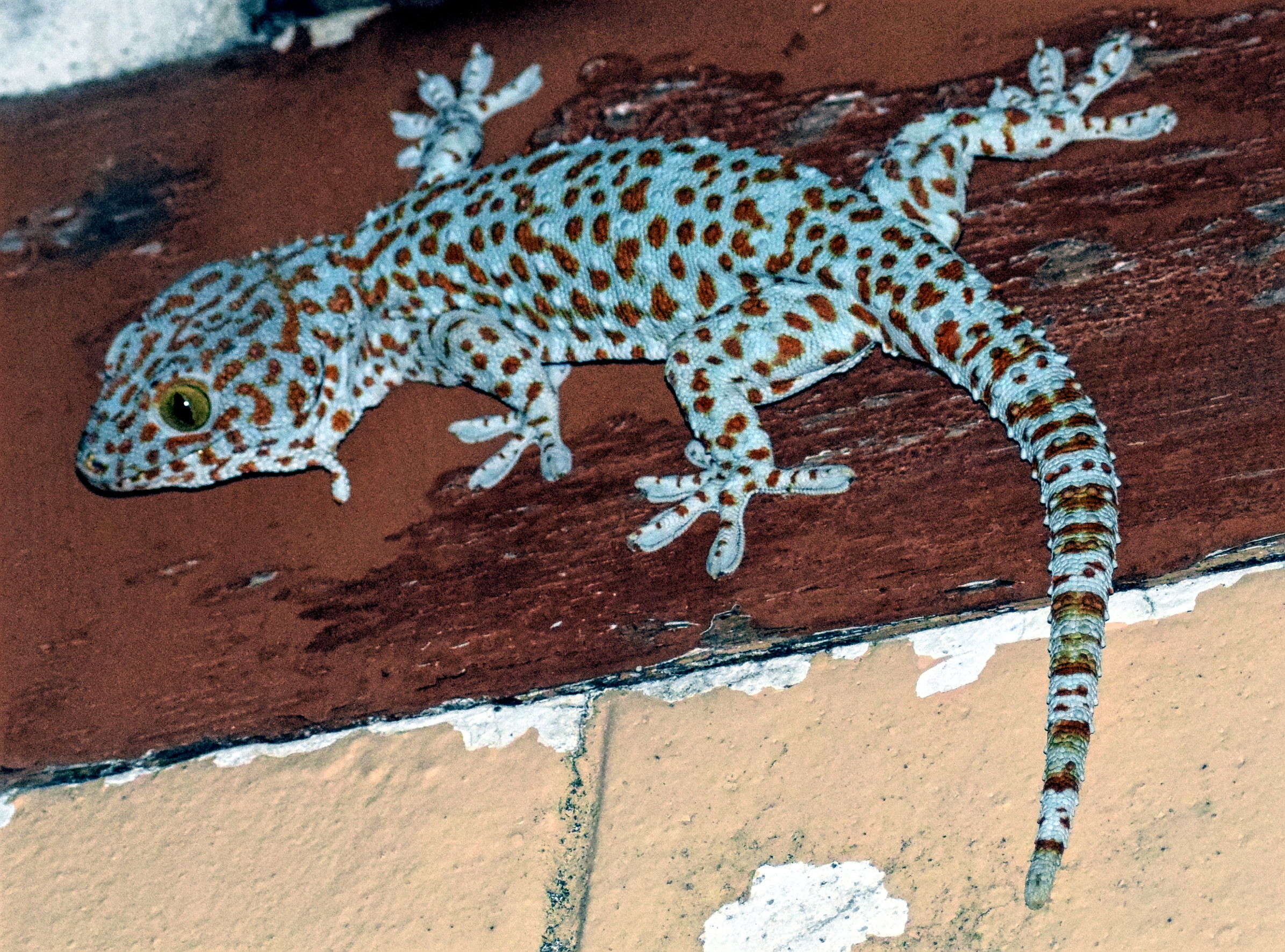
Tokay gecko, one of several gecko species

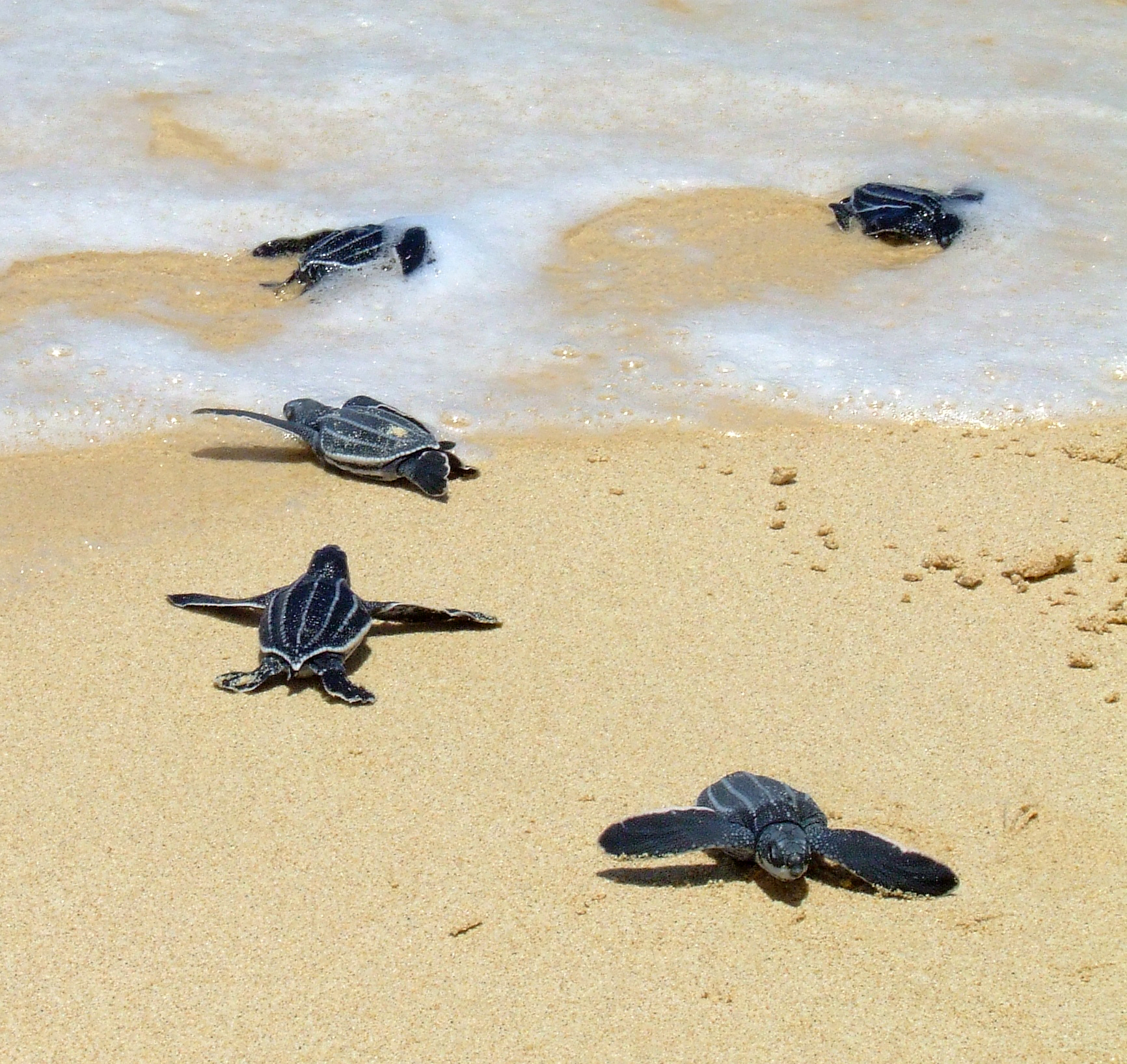
Leatherback sea turtle

== Flora ==
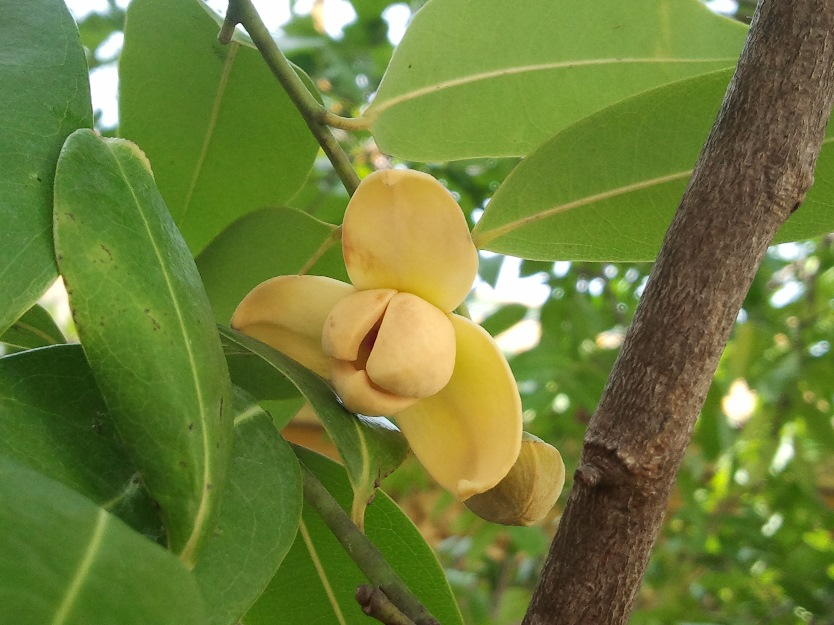
Rumdul flower, Cambodia's national flower

Cambodia supports more than 3,000 identified plant species, many of which are endemic to unique local ecosystems such as the Tonlé Sap floodplain, forests of the Cardamom and Dâmrei Mountains, and elevated plains. These ecosystems provide diverse habitats that sustain a variety of plant species, contributing to the country's rich biodiversity.

In Cambodia forest cover is around 46% of the total land area, equivalent to 8,068,370 hectares (ha) of forest in 2020, down from 11,004,790 hectares (ha) in 1990. In 2020, naturally regenerating forest covered 7,464,400 hectares (ha) and planted forest covered 603,970 hectares (ha). Of the naturally regenerating forest 4% was reported to be primary forest (consisting of native tree species with no clearly visible indications of human activity). For the year 2015, 100% of the forest area was reported to be under public ownership.

=== National flower ===
- Rumdul: Cambodia's national flower is the rumdul (Mitrella mesnyi). This flower is valued for its fragrant yellow-white blooms and is commonly found in rural areas across the country. It symbolizes elegance and is often used in traditional ceremonies and festivals.

=== Rare and endangered species ===
Several plant species in Cambodia are considered rare and/or endangered, highlighting the importance of conservation efforts:

- Nepenthes bokorensis: One of two rare pitcher plants endemic to Cambodia, found growing in the Dâmrei Mountains. This species is notable for its insect-trapping mechanism and distinctive pitcher shape.
- Aquilaria crassna (chankreussna): A critically endangered tree species valued for its aromatic resin, known as agarwood, used in perfume and traditional medicine. Overharvesting for its valuable resin has significantly reduced its population in the wild.
- Cinnamomum cambodianum: A non-scented species of cinnamon tree endemic to Cambodian forests, primarily in the Cardamom and Dâmrei Mountains. It is also possibly present in the border region between Cambodia and Thailand. This tree species faces threats from illegal logging and habitat destruction.

=== Conservation efforts ===
Efforts to preserve Cambodia's flora include the establishment of protected areas and national parks, such as Preah Monivong National Park and the Cardamom Mountains Protected Forests. Organizations and government initiatives are working towards sustainable management and conservation practices to protect these valuable plant species and their habitats.

== Threats ==
Sand mining in waterways, overfishing, illicit fishing methods, and the illegal wildlife trafficking are the three main threats to biodiversity in Cambodia. Deforestation continues to be a severe and growing threat to Cambodia's wildlife habitats. In 2024, Cambodia lost approximately 93,000 hectares of tree cover an area comparable in scale to a major urban centre with around 56% of that loss occurring inside the country's protected area network, according to an analysis of satellite data from the Global Land Analysis and Discovery laboratory at the University of Maryland in partnership with Global Forest Watch. Major sites of loss included Prey Lang Wildlife Sanctuary, where approximately 9,346 hectares were cleared in 2024, partly due to the construction of a new high-voltage transmission line cutting through the lowland rainforest. In the Cardamom Mountain region, poaching through snaring is another major factor in the decline in the population of pileated gibbons, dholes, serows, spotted linsangs and many more.

== See also ==
- List of protected areas of Cambodia
- Wildlife of Ratanakiri
- Cardamom Mountains
- Wildlife of Asia
- Natural resources of Cambodia
