= Lomphat Wildlife Sanctuary =

Protected area in northeast Cambodia

- Khmer: ដែនជម្រកសត្វព្រៃលំផាត់
- IUCN category IV (habitat/species management area)
- Location within Cambodia
- Location: Ratanakiri, Mondulkiri, and Kratie, Cambodia
- Nearest city: Banlung
- Coordinates: 13°19′18″N 106°55′11″E
- Area: 2,514.68 km^{2} (970.92 sq mi)
- Established: 1993
- Governing body: Ministry of Environment

Lomphat Wildlife Sanctuary is a protected area covering 2,514.68 km^{2} (970.92 sq mi) in eastern Cambodia that was established in 1993. It is heavily forested and straddles Ratanakiri, Mondulkiri, and Kratie provinces. It is home to a variety of endangered wildlife such as banteng, gaur, dholes and sun bear, as well as leopards, Eld's deer, sambar deer, muntjacs and wild pigs. In addition, a number of rare birds are present: surveys have confirmed the presence of green peafowl, greater and lesser adjutant storks, sarus cranes, Oriental pied hornbills, giant ibises, white-shouldered ibises, milky and woolly-necked storks, and slender-billed and white-rumped vultures, which are increasingly rare in most of South and Southeast Asia.

A Chinese company is planning to build a dam on the Srepok River, which would flood the surrounding villages and inundate more than a third of the sanctuary.

== See also ==
- Wildlife of Cambodia
- Wildlife of Ratanakiri
