= Alex Cearns =

Australian photographer, writer

Alex Cearns OAM
- Occupation: Photographer
- Years active: 2006–present
- Known for: Animal Photography

Alex Cearns is an Australian photographer who is known for her pet, animal, and wildlife photography. She is the founder of Houndstooth Studio and has won more than 350 awards for business, philanthropy and animal photography, including the Best Canine Photographer in Australia in 2011 and 2013. She is the official photographer for the Dogs' Refuge Home of WA and has been featured in numerous books and magazines as well as the television show The Couch.

== Career ==
Cearns grew up in South Australia, before moving to Western Australia when she was aged 11. She worked as a police officer, then a crime analyst with the Western Australian Police Service for 14 years. She then spent 5 years auditing airports for the Federal Australian Government. Her photography career started in 2006 after being inspired a year prior on a trip to Tasmania with a friend. She saw her friend using an SLR camera while she was using a film camera. When she returned from her trip, she purchased an SLR camera and multiple lenses. In an interview with Photo Review Magazine, she stated that she planned to photograph many different niches, but found herself taking more photographs of animals than anything else. During a trip to the Cocos Islands in 2007, Cearns took images of blue clams at a breeding facility. She entered the images into different state and national photo contests and won 2 of the contests while placing in 2 others. She opened Houndstooth Studio in 2008 which was named a finalist in the Telstra Business Awards in 2012 and 2013.

Cearns' work has been featured in numerous exhibits. One of the most notable was Look Twice, an exhibit featuring 60 photographs of 50 species of animals that she took while on a trip to Bali. The photos included dogs, cats, turtles, snakes, and piglets from the island. In an interview, Cearns stated she became overwhelmed at the neglected animals since she first visited the island in 2010. The exhibit was held on Swan, Alfred Cove in 2012, with proceeds of the sale of the photos going to support the Bali Animal Welfare Association. In 2013, Cearns held another solo exhibit to benefit wildlife, this time in Cambodia. The exhibit, Cambodia Wild, was photographed in Cambodia and included photos of Asian elephants, Indochinese tigers, Sun and Moon bears, and rare otters. The profits from the exhibit went to benefit Free the Bears Fund and Wildlife Alliance.

Cearns has appeared in numerous publications and also on television regarding her work. Most notably she has been a regular guest on The Couch, a television show broadcast in Australia and New Zealand. She has been interviewed on the show numerous times, including being a panelist on the show's BitchN segment. In 2013 she conducted a live pet photo session on the show and also was an interviewer herself when she hosted Mary Hutton from Free the Bears Fund. Cearns released her first photo book in 2014. Titled Mother Knows Best: Life Lessons from the Animal World, it featured photos of various animals, capturing each one's character.

Since the release of her first book, Cearns has gone on to publish three more: Joy: A Celebration of the Animal Kingdom (2014), Zen Dogs (2016) and her latest release in 2018, Perfect Imperfection: Dog Portraits of Resilience and Love. She also contributed photographs to the book Things Your Dog Wants You to Know by Laura Vissaritis.

== Awards and exhibitions ==
Cearns has won numerous awards for her photography. Her first award-winning photograph "Blue Clams" also received a High Commendation in the ANZANG Nature and Landscape Photographer of the Year Competition and was displayed at the Western Australian Museum in Perth. The photograph was also part of a travelling ANZANG exhibition Australia from December 2008 to February 2009. Cearns was also chosen as a photo contributor for the 2012 book The Divinity of Dogs: True Stories of Miracles Inspired by Man's Best Friend, written by Jennifer Skiff, which has been published in the United States, United Kingdom, Australia and Italy.

=== Selected awards ===
- 2019 Recipient - Order of Australia Medal - For services to the community through charitable organisations.
- 2013 Finalist - Pride of Australia Medal 2013
- 2013, 2012 Australian Business Excellence Awards Australia Day Honours List
- 2013, 2011 Best Canine Photographer /Artist in Australia – National Annual Master Dog Breeders and Associates Dog Owners Choice Awards
- 2012, Australian Business Excellence Awards Top 3
- 2012, Australian Business Excellence Awards Top 40
- 2012, Australian Telstra Business Awards Finalist, Micro Business
- 2012, Australian Telstra Business Awards Finalist, Peoples Choice
- 2008, 3 x BRONZE AWARDS – International Aperture Awards Nature Category
- 2008, Winner – York Society Photographic Awards, Open Colour Category, Western Australia for Blue Clams.
- 2008, 8 x SEMI FINALS – Wildlife Photographer of the Year, run by BBC and Natural History Museum, United Kingdom.
- 2007, Winner – People & Pets Section, DOTARS Photography Competition, Canberra, ACT.

=== Select exhibitions ===
- 2013 Cambodia Wild (solo exhibit)
- 2012 Look Twice – the animals of Bali as never seen before (Solo Exhibition)
- 2012 Silvery Gibbon Art Auction
- 2012 Sentience Hidden Lives

== Publications ==
- 2014 - Mother Knows Best: Life Lessons from the Animal World
- 2014 - Joy: A Celebration of the Animal Kingdom
- 2015 - Things Your Dog Wants You to Know - Laura Vissaritis (Photographic Credits)
- 2016 - Zen Dogs
- 2018 - Perfect Imperfection: Dog Portraits of Resilience and Love

== Philanthropy ==
Cearns is involved with numerous charities, which, in 2019, amounted to her being awarded the Order of Australia medal. In addition to her work with the RSPCA, she has provided pro-bono work for other charities such as Kanyana Wildlife Rehabilitation Center, Animal Aid Abroad, Animals Australia, Free the Bears Inc, Dogs Refuge Home, Stop Live Exports, Saving Animals From Euthanasia (SAFE), World Animal Protection, Wildlife Alliance (Cambodia), Evolve! (UK), Sea Shepherd and the WA Dingo Association. Cearns is also a member of HeARTs Speak and has partnered with the Bali Animal Welfare Association (BAWA) to bring awareness to abandoned street animals in Bali. It was reported that in 2012, Cearns donated more than $500,000 worth of photography services that included images, vouchers, and sponsorship of more than 40 animal related charitable organizations.
