= IGCP =

IGCP may refer to

- International Geoscience Programme, an organization that facilitates research cooperation among geoscientists
- International Gorilla Conservation Programme, formed in 1991 to ensure that the critically endangered mountain gorillas are conserved
