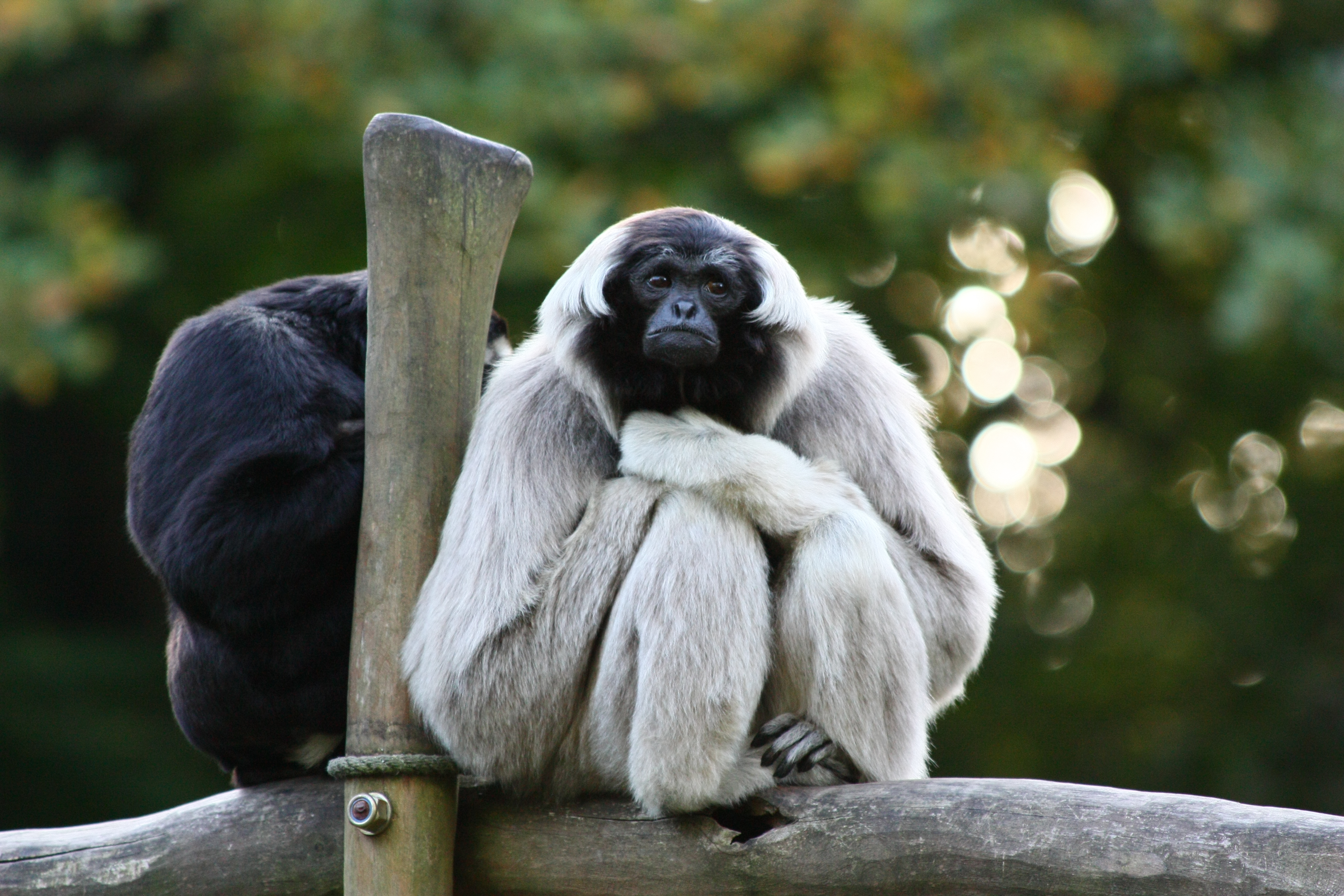
- Male (black) and female (pale)
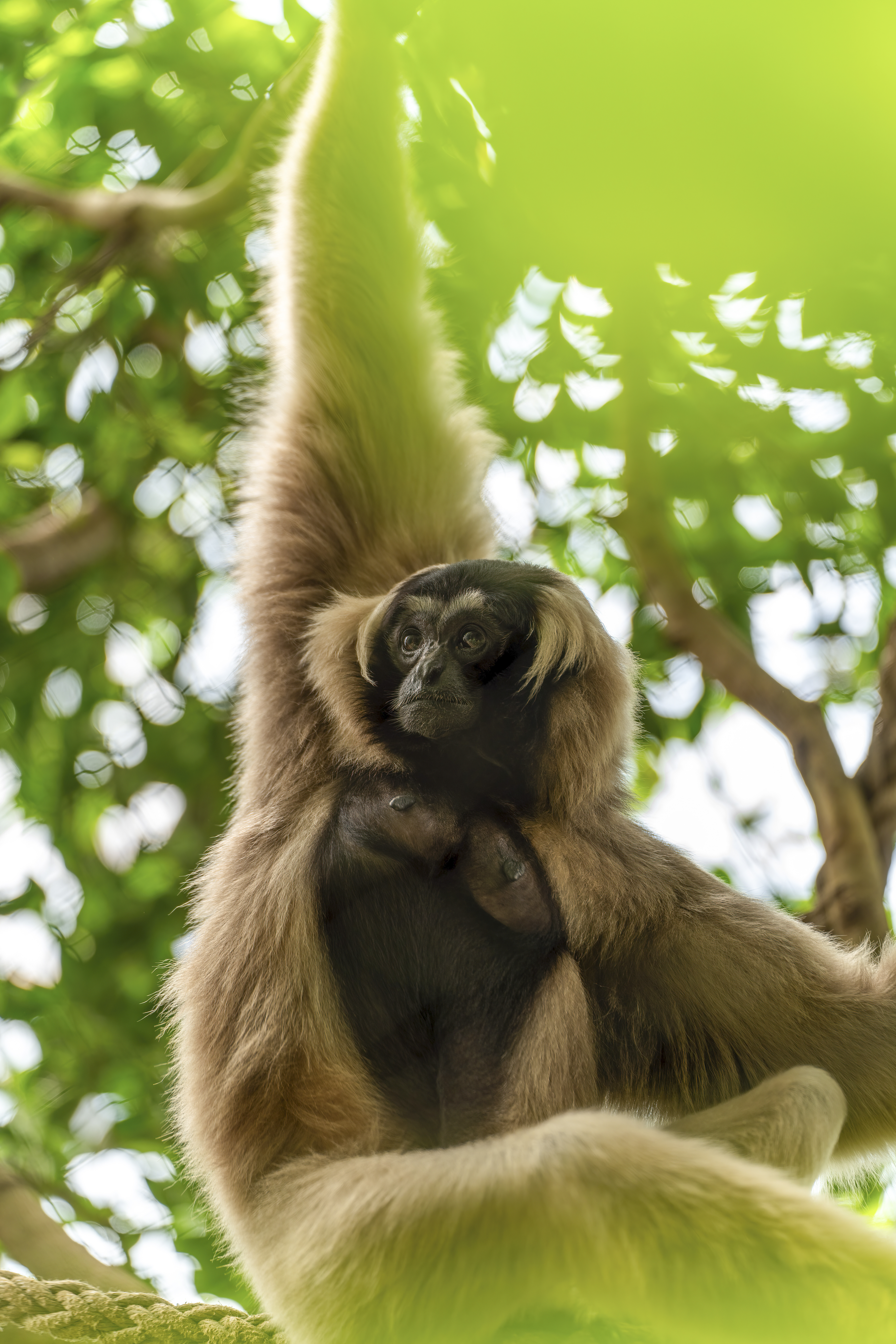
- Female

Conservation status
- Endangered (IUCN 3.1)
- CITES Appendix I

Scientific classification
- Kingdom: Animalia
- Phylum: Chordata
- Class: Mammalia
- Infraclass: Placentalia
- Order: Primates
- Superfamily: Hominoidea
- Family: Hylobatidae
- Genus: Hylobates
- Species: H. pileatus

Binomial name
- Hylobates pileatus (J. E. Gray, 1861)
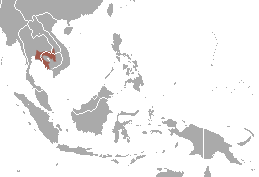
- Pileated gibbon range

= Pileated gibbon =

Species of ape

The pileated gibbon (Hylobates pileatus) is a primate in the gibbon family, Hylobatidae.

The pileated gibbon has sexual dimorphism in fur coloration: males have purely black fur, while females have buff-coloured or white-grey fur with only the belly and head black. The white and often shaggy hair ring around the head is common to both sexes.

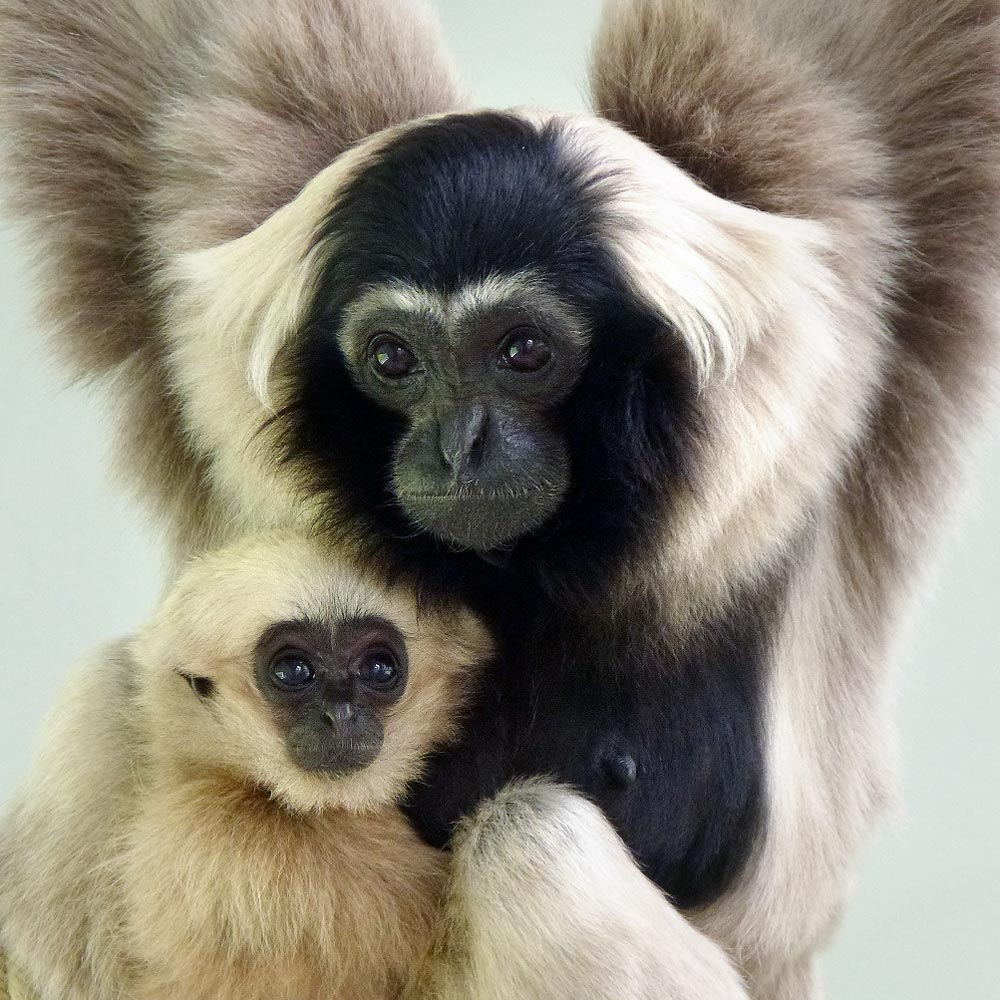
Mother and infant

The species has been identified as endangered and is listed in CITES Appendix I. Their main threat is habitat destruction, with the natural forest they live in being converted into farmland. This has led to local extinction in some areas. Also, like many other primate species, they are hunted and captured for meat and sold into wildlife smuggling. Many attempts have been made to survey and increase the species' numbers, both concerning their status in the wild, and in zoos.

== Range ==
The range of the pileated gibbon is eastern Thailand, western Cambodia and southwest Laos. Its lifestyle is much like other gibbons: diurnal and arboreal, it lives together in a monogamous pair, brachiates through the trees with its long arms, and predominantly eats fruits, leaves and small animals. Reproduction habits are not well known, but are presumed to be similar to the other gibbons. Mating pairs also mark their own territory together, with the female and male performing loud vocalisations to show this.

The pileated gibbon is found in the following areas. There are about 35,000 individuals in Cambodia and about 30,000 in Thailand.

- Khao Yai National Park, Thailand
- Thap Lan National Park, Thailand
- Khao Ang Ru Nai Sanctuary, Thailand
- Khao Soi Dao Sanctuary, Thailand
- Pang Sida National Park, Thailand
- Ta Phraya National Park, Thailand
- Cardamom Mountains, Cambodia (about 20,000 individuals)
- Bokor National Park, Cambodia (about 1,000 individuals)

== Audio gallery ==
Pileated gibbon family singing, Khao Yai National Park, Thailand

== Rescue, rehabilitation and release of the pileated gibbon ==
The non-profit organization Wildlife Alliance has cooperated with the Cambodian government to conduct rescue and release programs for the pileated gibbon in Cambodia:

- Rescue - A unique law enforcement team mandated to crack down on the illegal wildlife trade throughout Cambodia, the Wildlife Rapid Rescue Team confiscates approximately 5-6,000 live animals annually and has rescued more than 56,000 live animals from its creation in 2001 through 2013. Most of these animals are immediately released into safe habitat, and those who need temporary rehabilitation or permanent care are brought to Phnom Tamao Wildlife Rescue Centre. Gibbons are threatened by capture for the meat trade and pet trade in addition to threats by habitat loss.
- Rehabilitation - Most of the pileated gibbons at Phnom Tamao Wildlife Rescue Centre were confiscated from the illegal meat trade or pet trade, rendering them too humanized to be released. However through the center's breeding program in which mothers raise their own offspring, gibbons have been successfully prepared for life in the wild.
- Release - In December 2013 a pair of pileated gibbons were successfully released into the protected forests of the Angkor UNESCO World Heritage Site near the ancient temple complexes. This initiative by Wildlife Alliance, the Cambodian Forestry Administration and the Apsara Authority who manages the World Heritage Site is the group's first step of many toward repopulating the formerly barren forests surrounding the famous Angkor temples.
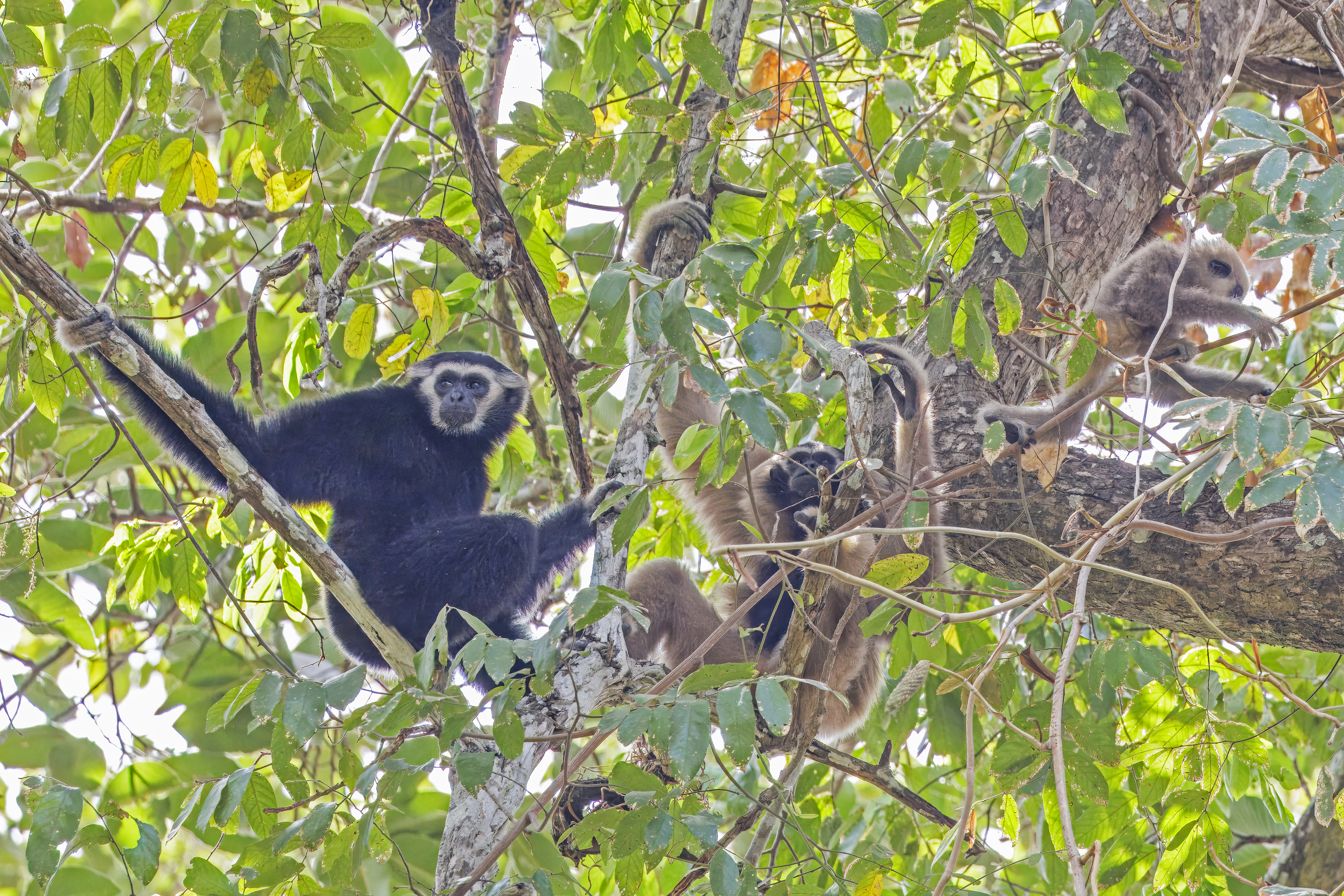
family (male on left)
Angkor Wat

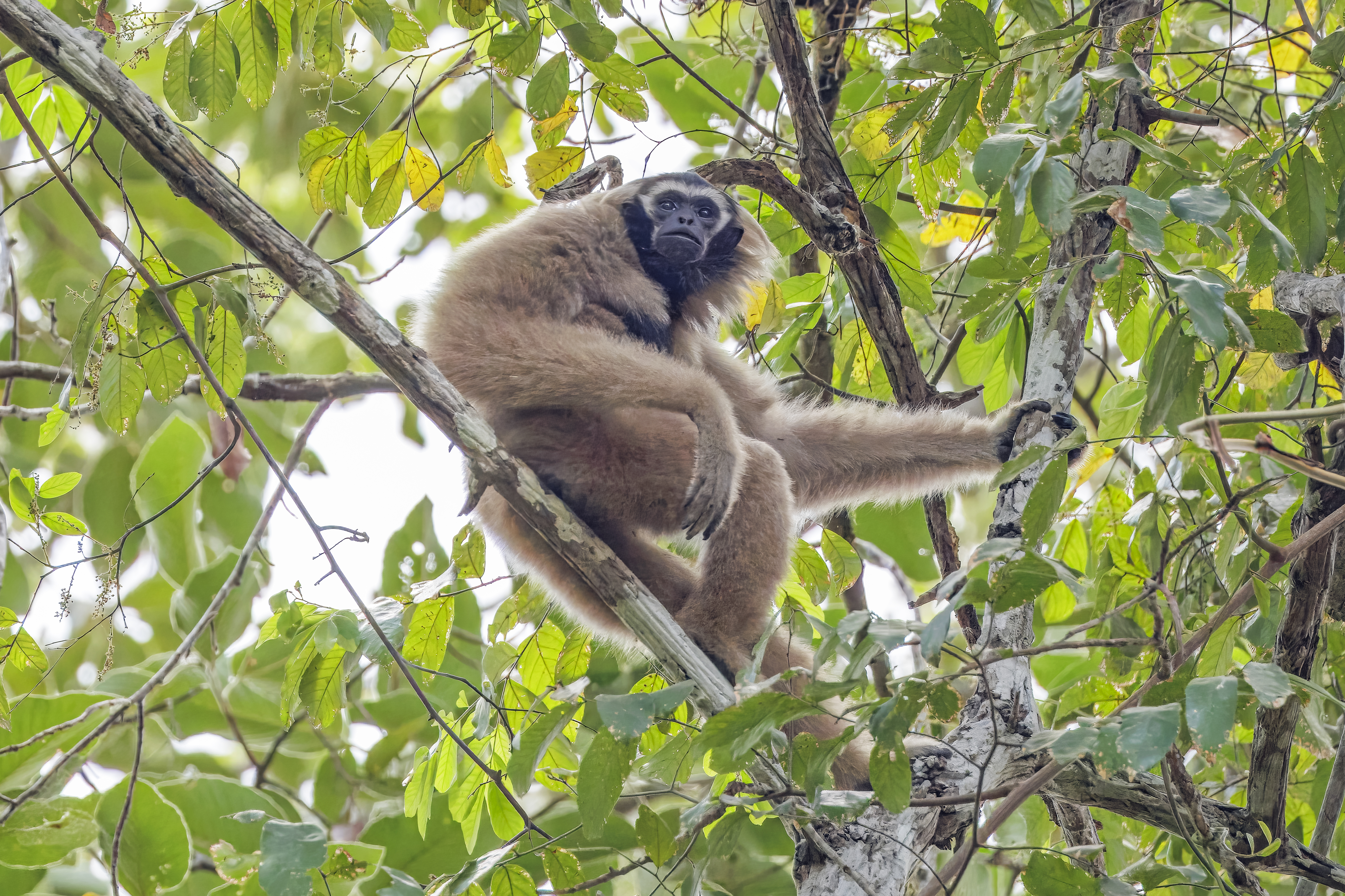
female
Angkor Wat

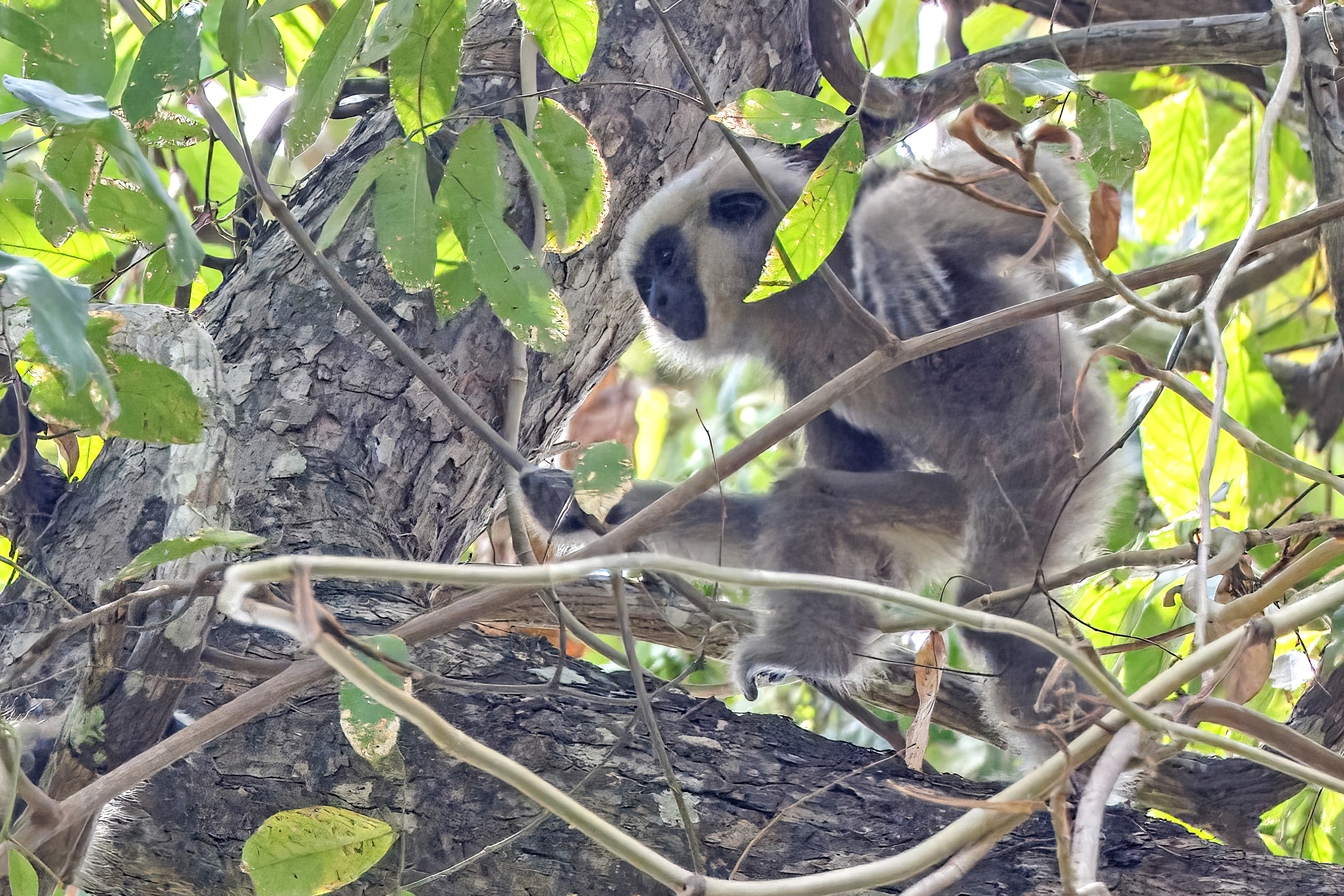
juvenile
Angkor Wat
