= Oryx (journal) =

- Discipline: Conservation
- Language: English
- Edited by: Martin Fisher

Publication details
- History: 1903–present
- Publisher: Cambridge University Press, on behalf of Fauna & Flora International
- Frequency: Bimonthly

Standard abbreviations
- ISO 4: Oryx

Indexing
- CODEN: ORYXAM
- ISSN: 0030-6053 (print); 1365-3008 (web)
- LCCN: 85650563
- OCLC no.: 476155896

Links
- Journal homepage; Online access

Oryx—The International Journal of Conservation is an open access, peer-reviewed academic journal of conservation science and practice, published bimonthly by Cambridge University Press on behalf of Fauna & Flora International.

The journal publishes material on biodiversity conservation, conservation policy and sustainable use, and the interaction of these subjects with social, economic and political issues. It is interdisciplinary and has a particular interest in material that has the potential to improve conservation management and practice, supports the publishing and communication aspirations of conservation researchers and practitioners worldwide and helps build capacity for conservation. Besides research Articles and Short Communications, Oryx regularly publishes Reviews, Forum Articles, Book Reviews and Letters, and every issue includes a selection of international conservation news.

The journal provides a free Writing for Conservation guide to help researchers communicate their message through well-crafted text and graphics.

The journal was established in 1904 as Journal of the Society for the Preservation of the Wild Fauna of the Empire, and is currently edited by Martin Fisher. The name changed to Journal of the Society for the Preservation of the Fauna of the Empire, and the publication acquired its current name in 1950.
