= Phnom Tamao Wildlife Rescue Centre =

Coordinates: 11°18′02″N 104°48′04″E

- Interactive map of Phnom Tamao Wildlife Rescue Centre
- Date opened: 1995
- Location: Takéo Province, Cambodia
- Land area: 6,000 acres
- No. of animals: 1200
- No. of species: 102
- Website: http://phnomtamaozoo.com

The Phnom Tamao Wildlife Rescue Centre (PTWRC; French: Parc zoologique de Phnom Tamao) is a wildlife centre located roughly 25 miles (40 km) by road south of Phnom Penh, Cambodia. The centre was established in 1995 and with an area of over 6,000 acres of protected regenerating forest, this is the largest zoo in Cambodia. Since 2001, PTWRC has been run by the government institution of Cambodian Forestry Administration in partnership with an environmental non-profit organization called Wildlife Alliance. Wildlife Alliance animal husbandry specialists, veterinarians, and care takers assist in the feeding and care of animals and operations. PTWRC currently houses over 1,200 rescued animals from 102 species including endangered Asian elephants, tigers, Pileated gibbon, Siamese crocodile, Malayan sun bears, among many others. Many of the species are listed as Endangered or Vulnerable by the International Union for Conservation of Nature (IUCN).

A captive breeding and release program for the critically endangered Siamese crocodile led by Fauna & Flora International operates out of facilities at Phnom Tamao.

== Rescued Animals at Phnom Tamao Sanctuary ==
Rescued animals at Phnom Tamao can be seen through general park admission, through the wildlife tours organized by Wildlife Alliance, Free the Bears, and independent tour operators.

=== Bears ===
Phnom Tamao is home to the world's largest group of rescued Malayan sun bears together with a number of Moon bears or Asiatic black bears. The bear sanctuary covers an area of over 10 hectares and is home to more than 130 rescued bears which have been supported by Free the Bears since 1997. The bear sanctuary contains a dedicated classroom for visiting school groups "The Bear Den", a visitor centre and number of education zones for general visitors "The Bear Discovery Centre" and "The Bear Discovery Trail", a children's play area "The Home of the Wild Things" and a dedicated research facility "The Field Station" for student researchers undertaking projects aimed at improving the welfare of captive bears or promoting conservation of wild bears. Visitors wishing to spend time helping with the care of the bears and seeing behind the scenes of the world's biggest sanctuary for the world's smallest bear can join either the one-day Bear Care Tour (http://www.freethebears.org/index.php/help-the-bears/bear-care-tour) or Free the Bears volunteer programme for longer stays of 1–12 weeks (http://www.freethebears.org/index.php/help-the-bears/volunteer)

=== Elephants ===
Asian elephant Chhouk has his prosthetic leg changed twice daily by keepers

Elephants at Phnom Tamao have been trained using gentle Positive Reinforcement or Target Training. This means that they will simply not receive their “reward” (pieces of fruit or vegetables) if they do not follow the keeper's verbal command. It is often preferable to train captive elephants because they can then be handled more safely, which means their health can be checked and they can be better cared for.

Chhouk The youngest male elephant at Phnom Tamao has a prosthetic leg. Chhouk was found wandering alone in the Srepok Wilderness Area in Mondulkiri with a serious leg injury, most likely caused by a snare. The Forestry Administration in cooperation with Wildlife Alliance brought him to PTWRC as he would have died left on his own. Once his foot healed, the Cambodian School of Prosthetics and Orthotics designed Chhouk a prosthetic leg to help him walk normally again. In order to change the prosthesis twice daily, Chhouk is trained with a positive reinforcement rewards-based system.

Lucky The "gentle giant". Lucky has been trained through rewards-based positive reinforcement to respond to 20 different words (in English and Khmer). Watching and interacting with Lucky has said to help engage visitors in the experience of the elephants.

=== Tigers ===
The Cambodian Forestry Administration assisted by Wildlife Alliance confiscated 7 tigers in a sting operation in Phnom Penh in the year 2000. This was done to demonstrate that tigers could still be illegally purchased in Cambodia, despite the fact that there are now almost none left in the wild. One had been so severely beaten that she died of brain damage. The others were nursed backed to health, quickly responding to the care they received from Wildlife Alliance. The tigers are now kept in pairs in their large, forested enclosures.

== Rescue of Wildlife throughout Cambodia ==
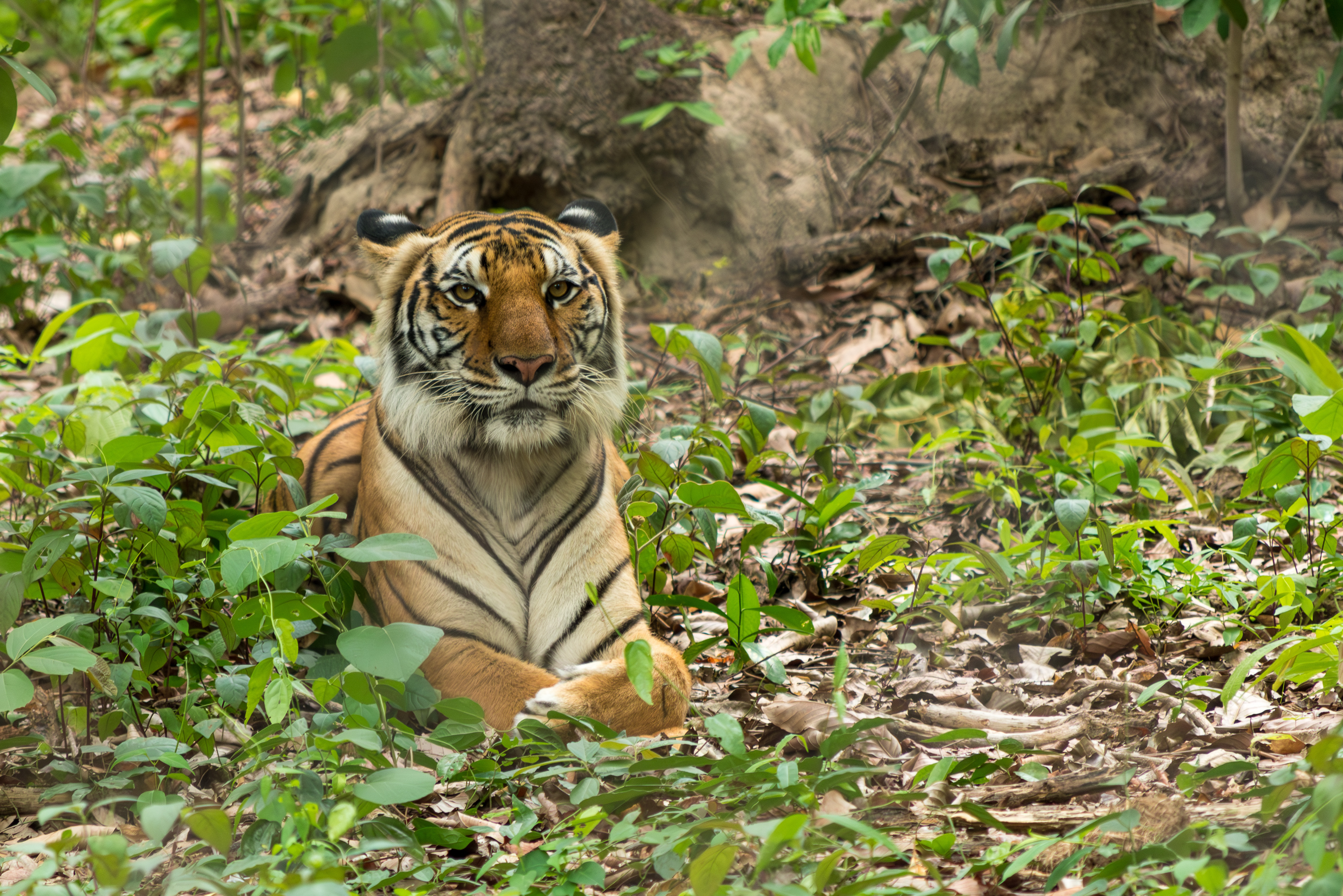
Fari, a rescued tiger, lying in her enclosure at Phnom Tamao in July 2024

All of the animals living at PTWRC were confiscated from the illegal wildlife trade, victims of habitat loss, donated by a private owner, or rescued in a human-wildlife conflict situation. Most were rescued by the Wildlife Rapid Rescue Team, formed in 2001. The Wildlife Rapid Rescue Team has rescued more than 50,000 live animals and confiscated large quantities of animal parts and other contraband.

The Wildlife Rapid Rescue Team (WRRT) was established in cooperation with Wildlife Alliance, Cambodia’s Ministry of Agriculture, Forestry and Fishery’s Department of Forestry Administration and the Royal Gendarmerie Khmer. WRRT is a 14-member team composed of Forestry Administration officials and Military Police who are mandated to crack down on the illegal wildlife trade throughout Cambodia, tracking down poachers and traffickers, raiding restaurants, markets, and stores, and investigating trafficking networks in cities and along borders. WRRT is a unique law enforcement squad in Southeast Asia, being devoted solely to combating the illegal wildlife trade.

WRRT receives tips from a covert informant network and from the nationwide public hotline number. When WRRT rescues live animals, those that are healthy and suited for the wild are immediately released in an appropriate habitat. Animals that cannot be released because of injuries or trauma are cared for by Wildlife Alliance's Care for Rescued Wildlife team at the Phnom Tamao Wildlife Rescue Center.

While Wildlife Alliance provides capacity building with logistical and technical support to WRRT, WRRT also trains teams working for other organizations that are addressing the illegal wildlife trade, both in the manner in which they conduct operations and in animal handling skills. WRRT’s skill in handling and caring for rescued wild animals is such that there are almost never any fatalities, despite the poor conditions in which most traded wildlife is found.

In 2010 Wildlife Alliance worked with the Cambodian Government to implement ASEAN-WEN (Wildlife Enforcement Network) in which authorities work with their counterparts in the neighboring countries to try to stop the cross-border trade.

== Illegal Wildlife Trade ==
Until 2001, Cambodia’s most prominent markets openly displayed rare animals for purchase and wildlife meats were commonplace on restaurant menus. Today wildlife dishes are no longer available at 90% of restaurants in the nation’s capital. Today the illegal wildlife trade is predominantly run by the same dangerous groups behind drug and weapons trafficking.

When illegal traders are caught by the Wildlife Rapid Rescue Team (WRRT), their contraband and equipment are confiscated. Traders are handed over to the courts, who impose prison terms and fines. Fines can be considerable and amounts of money have risen steadily as officials realize the importance of implementing laws protecting wild animals. This acts as a great deterrent, which ultimately makes it unprofitable for traders to stay in business. The Wildlife Rapid Rescue Team is not a forest patrol unit but a task force with a nationwide mandate that deals with the illegal trade, usually conducted from towns and cities. It does not address subsistence hunting but mostly the lucrative business conducted by middle men, who sell live and dead wild animals to restaurants and medical stores or export wildlife for consumption in neighboring countries.

== Release of Rescued Wildlife ==
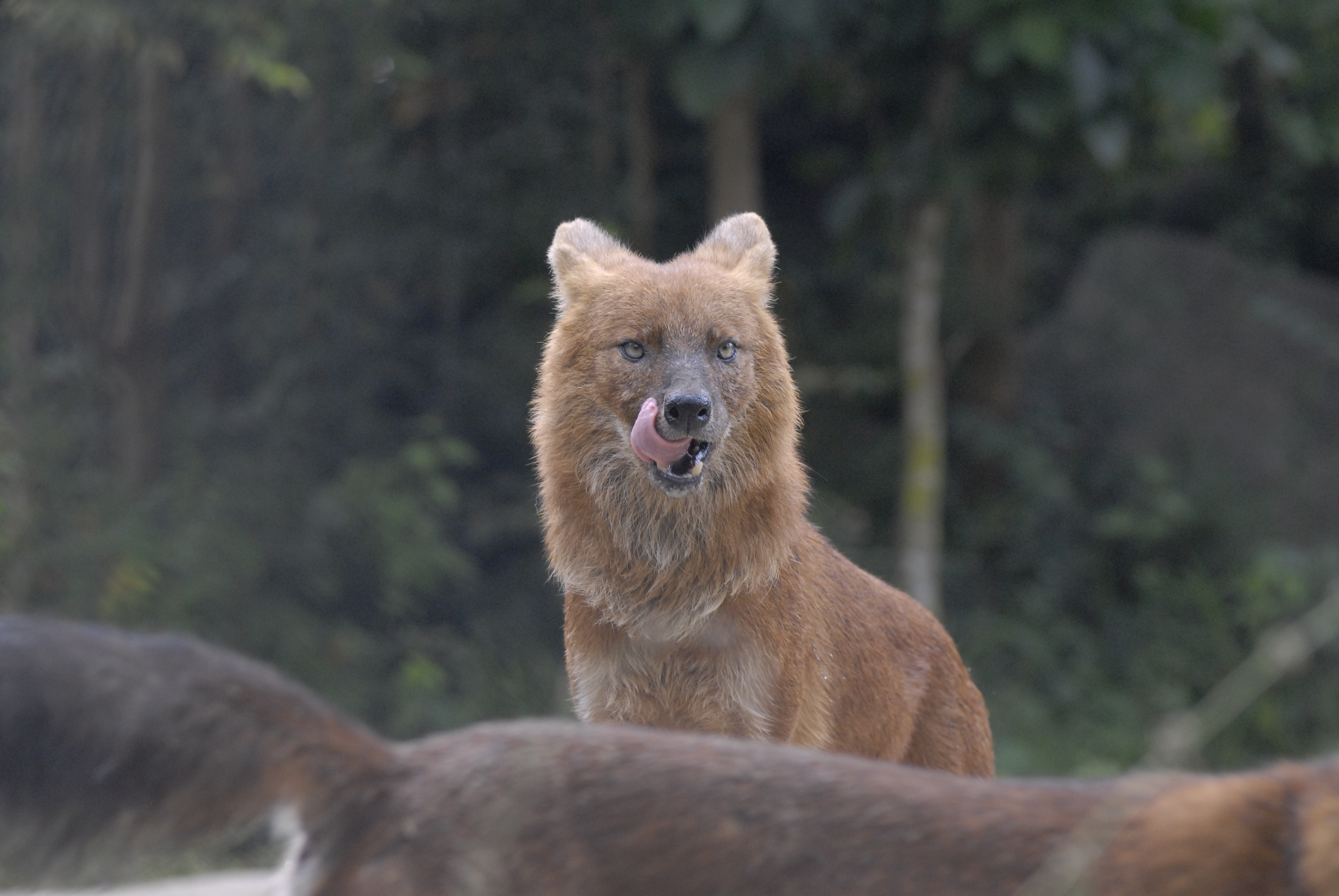
Dhole at Phnom Tamao in November 2006

Rescued animals that are deemed suitable for release into the wild are relocated to a Wildlife Rehabilitation Station (WRS) created by Wildlife Alliance in Koh Kong Province, Cambodia. Here the animals are moved to a forested enclosure within an appropriate area of habitat where they are to be released. They are cared for within the enclosure for many months in order to become familiar with the area and relearn their wild instinctual behavior. When the animals are ready for release, the door to the enclosure is left open and the animals are free to leave at will. Wildlife Alliance continues to provide hands-off assistance and supplementary food at the enclosure location for as long as necessary.

Released animals are then monitored using various methods such as visual observation, track identification, camera traps, and radio telemetry to ensure release strategies are successful and the animals are able to survive. Animals are familiarized with their new habitat before release and given support as they grow comfortable with their new skills in the wild. Sun bears, binturong ("bear cats"), macaques, and birds are just a few of the animals that have begun the second phase of their life here. The priority for the Care for Rescued Wildlife Program is to continue developing and implementing rehabilitation and release programs for many of the rescued animals, while continuing to feed and care for the animals that need to call PTWRC home.
