= International Gorilla Conservation Programme =

International Gorilla Conservation Programme Programme international de conservation des gorilles
- Formation: 1991
- Type: INGO
- Purpose: Environmental protection
- Region served: Africa
- Director: Eugène Rutagarama
- Website: www.igcp.org
- Formerly called: Mountain Gorilla Project

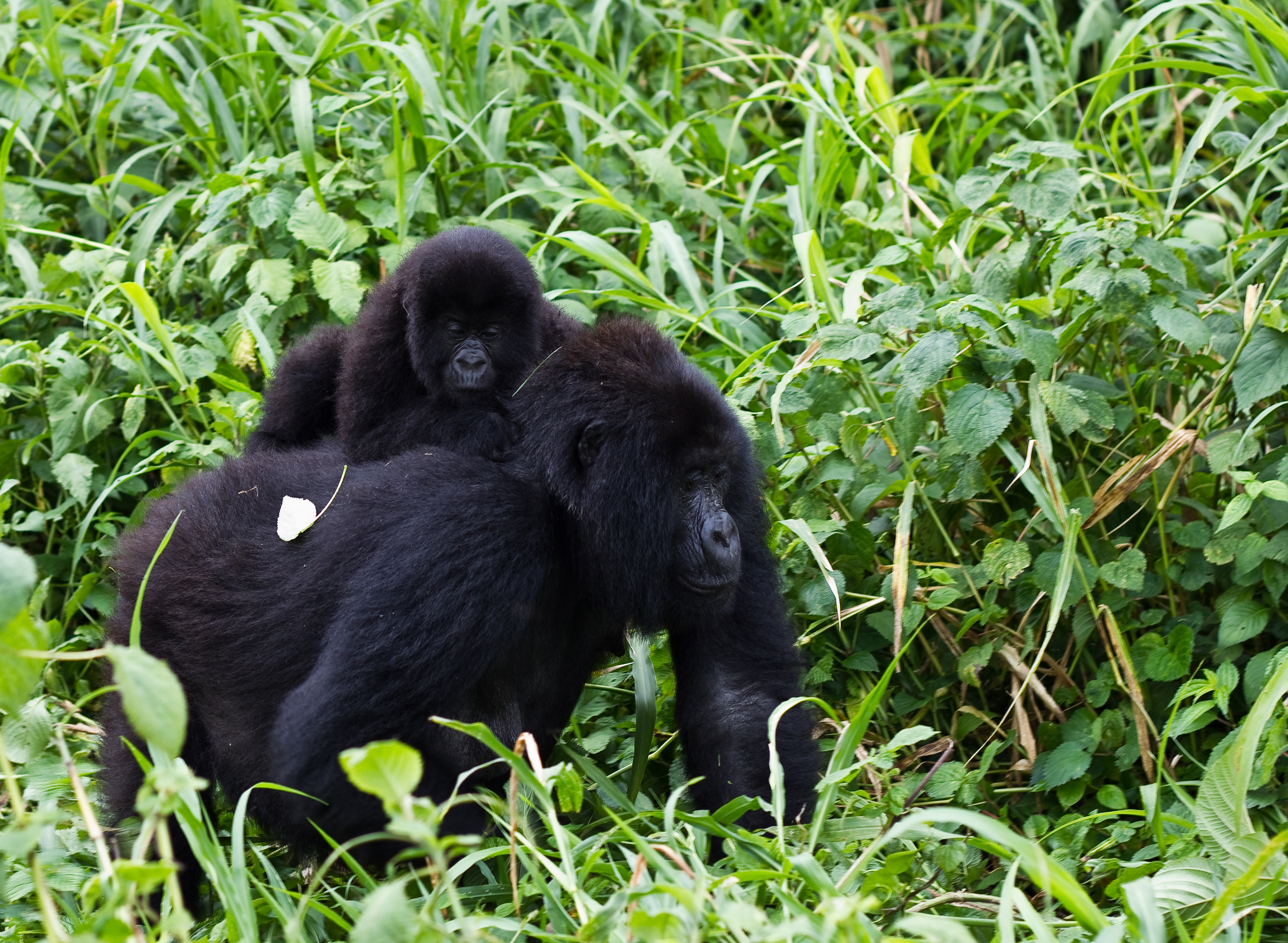
Mountain gorillas in Virunga National Park, Democratic Republic of the Congo

The International Gorilla Conservation Programme (IGCP; French: Programme international de conservation des gorilles) was formed in 1991 to ensure that the critically endangered mountain gorillas are conserved in their habitat in the mountain forests of the Virunga Massif in Rwanda, Uganda and the Democratic Republic of the Congo.

== Origins ==
The programme grew out of the work of Dian Fossey, who began to study Rwandan mountain gorillas in the 1960s. African Wildlife Foundation (AWF) President Robinson McIlvaine later said that "There would be no mountain gorillas in the Virungas today ... were it not for Dian Fossey's tireless efforts over many years". McIlvaine initiated formation of the Mountain Gorilla Project in 1979, the predecessor to the IGCP, while he was president of the AWF. Rosalind and Conrad Aveling were the first people to manage the Mountain Gorilla Project in Virunga National Park and Rosalind wrote the original proposal for IGCP. The International Gorilla Conservation Programme was formally established in 1991 by the AWF, Fauna & Flora International and the World Wide Fund for Nature.

During the ongoing and linked conflicts of the Rwandan Civil War (1990-1993) followed by the Rwandan genocide of 1994 and the Second Congo War (1998-2003) the best that could be done was to attempt to support park workers, many of whom lost their lives.

== Activities ==
The International Gorilla Conservation Programme works with the Rwanda Development Board, the Uganda Wildlife Authority and the Institut Congolais pour la Conservation de la Nature. The IGCP tries to gain support for conservation among the local communities, and to ensure that the protected area authorities collaborate with these local communities. Among other activities, the IGCP works with Virunga Artisans, which markets handmade products of artisans who live near the Volcanoes, Mgahinga and Bwindi National Parks. A census of mountain gorillas in the Virunga Massif in March and April 2010 showed that there had been a 26.3% increase in the population over the past seven years, an encouraging sign that conservation efforts were succeeding.

== See also ==
- Mgahinga Gorilla National Park
- Bwindi Impenetrable National Park
- Rwenzori Mountains National Park
- Virunga National Park
- Volcanoes National Park

== Sources ==
- "About the International Gorilla Conservation Programme". The International Gorilla Conservation Programme.
- "About Virunga Artisans". Virunga Artisans. Archived from the original on 2011-11-28.
- "Celebrating AWF's 40th Anniversary". African Conservation Foundation.
- Masozera, Anna Behm (December 7, 2010). "Census confirms increase in population of the critically endangered Virunga mountain gorillas". Greater Virunga Transboundary Executive Secretariat.
- "Robinson McIlvaine 1913 - 2001". AWF.
