= Fauna and Flora International =

Conservation organization

Fauna & Flora
- Formation: 1903; 123 years ago
- Type: INGO
- Purpose: Wildlife conservation; Evidence-based conservation; Sustainability; Capacity building
- Headquarters: Cambridge
- Region served: Africa, Asia-Pacific, Central America, Caribbean, Eurasia
- Chair of Council: Stephen Fitzgerald AO
- Chief Executive: Kristian Teleki
- Key people: Edward Buxton, Prince William, Prince of Wales, Princess Laurentien of the Netherlands, David Attenborough
- Main organ: Council
- Website: www.fauna-flora.org
- Formerly called: Fauna and Flora Preservation Society, Society for the Preservation of the Wild Fauna of the Empire, Fauna & Flora International, FFI

Fauna & Flora International (Fauna & Flora) is an international nature conservation charity and non-governmental organization based in the United Kingdom.

Founded as the Society for the Preservation of the Wild Fauna of the Empire, the society created some of the first game reserves and captive breeding programmes during the 20th century. The society's peer-reviewed scientific journal, now known as Oryx, has been publishing conservation science articles since 1904.

Fauna & Flora is constituted under English law as a company limited by guarantee and is a registered charity with its head office in Cambridge. Fauna & Flora has sister organisations in the U.S. and Australia, and a subsidiary in Singapore. Fauna & Flora works on wildlife conservation, habitat restoration, capacity building, community-based approaches and marine conservation.

Fauna & Flora had royal patronage dating back to Edward, Prince of Wales (later Edward VIII), who became the group's patron in 1928. Queen Elizabeth II was Fauna & Flora's patron for 68 years after her ascension to the throne until this was delegated to Prince William, Prince of Wales in October 2020. Princess Laurentien of the Netherlands is Fauna & Flora's current president.

== History ==
The Society for the Preservation of the Wild Fauna of the Empire was founded as a private organization in 1903 by a group made up of members of the British aristocracy and American statesmen in colonies in Africa. A central founding figure was Edward Buxton, who had previously sought to protect areas of the UK. The goal of the society was to protect southern Africa's large mammal populations, which had declined due to over-hunting and habitat encroachment, within game reserves. From 1903 to 1914, the society lobbied the British colonial government to protect areas of natural resources, control the ivory trade and change the policy of exterminating wildlife to control tsetse flies. The Society played a part in legislation which controlled hunting and preserved habitat in East Africa and South Africa, contributing to the formation of some of the first National Parks and future nature conservation. Modern scholars have characterised these early efforts as extensions of colonialism. Kruger National Park in South Africa, Serengeti National Park in Tanzania, and several game reserves in Kenya, among others, were first established through the work of the Society.

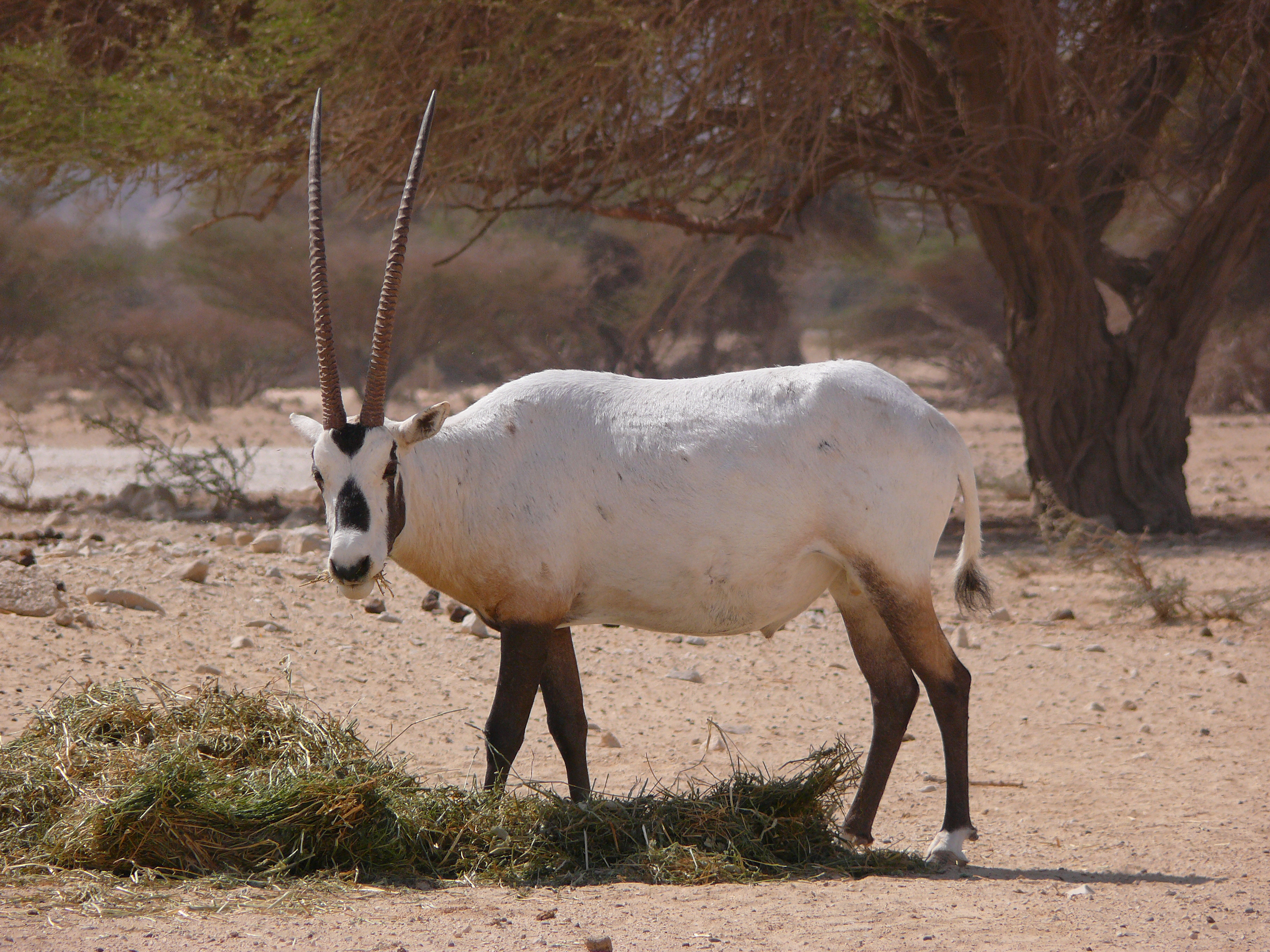
Fauna & Flora's previous logo and the name of its academic journal refer to the Arabian oryx (Oryx leucoryx), in reference to successful reintroduction campaigns led by the society.

In response to the extinction of the Arabian oryx, the organization launched Operation Oryx in collaboration with Phoenix Zoo during the 1960s and with follow-up during subsequent decades helped re-established wild populations in Oman, Jordan and Saudi Arabia. The practice of captive breeding and release used during Operation Oryx are now widely used in conservation initiatives.

The society was renamed the Fauna Preservation Society before being renamed Fauna and Flora Preservation Society in 1981 and finally Fauna and Flora International in 1995.

== Modern activities ==
In addition to global headquarters in the David Attenborough Building in Cambridge, Fauna & Flora coordinates conservation programmes in countries across the Caribbean, Central America, Africa, Eurasia and the Asia-Pacific.

The society's scientific journal – Oryx – The International Journal of Conservation – is published by Cambridge University Press. Since 2008, Fauna & Flora has also published the Cambodian Journal of Natural History, the first peer-reviewed journal in Cambodia, in partnership with the Royal University of Phnom Penh.

Fauna & Flora established the Mountain Gorilla Project in Rwanda in 1979 at the request of David Attenborough following the broadcast of Life on Earth. It is now known as the International Gorilla Conservation Programme and is run jointly with the World Wide Fund for Nature.

In Portugal, Fauna & Flora worked with Liga para a Proteção da Natureza on the reintroduction of the Iberian lynx.

In 2004, Fauna & Flora facilitated the purchase of a former colonial cattle ranch in Kenya and conversion into Ol Pejeta Conservancy, a wildlife sanctuary for black rhinoceros and other rare megafauna. Fauna & Flora also works to reduce human–elephant conflict through working with farmers.

In 2000, a Fauna & Flora led expedition in the Cardamom Mountains in Cambodia led to the rediscovery of the critically endangered Siamese crocodile in the wild, previously thought extinct. Since then, Fauna & Flora established and operated a captive breeding and release program at Phnom Tamao Wildlife Rescue Centre that has increased the wild population. In 2009, Fauna & Flora, Cambodian authorities and Wildlife Alliance coordinated a crackdown on illegal sassafras oil production in Phnom Samkos Wildlife Sanctuary in response to its role in deforestation and the harvesting of the critically endangered Cinnamomum parthenoxylon. Fauna & Flora also coordinates a master's degree in biodiversity conservation in partnership with the Royal University of Phnom Penh. Cambodia designated its first marine protected area around Koh Rong in 2016 following several years of collaboration with Fauna & Flora and other partners.

In the Carpathian Mountains of Romania, Fauna & Flora works to reduce poaching of bears and wolves by reducing conflict between farmers and wildlife.

Fauna & Flora began work in Myanmar in 2008. In 2010, a research team including Fauna & Flora described the Myanmar snub-nosed monkey, a new species. Fauna & Flora also conducts sea turtle conservation. In 2018, The Guardian published an article claiming that Fauna & Flora was embroiled in a row with ethnic Karen people in Myanmar and indigenous rights groups over plans to protect up to 800,000 acres of forest from poachers, loggers and palm oil companies. The initiative was seen as potentially displacing villages from ancestral lands without free, prior and informed consent, and having the potential to jeopardise a ceasefire agreement between the Myanmar government and the Karen National Union, which could lead to further conflict in the area. Fauna & Flora responded by asserting that indigenous people are "at the heart" of their work and that any protected area boundaries would not be decided without free, prior and informed consent. In 2020, Fauna & Flora was involved in the description of another new primate species, Trachypithecus popa, from Myanmar. There are thought to be around 200 individuals remaining in the wild.

Fauna & Flora was one of the organisations that campaigned for the banning of microbeads in cosmetic products in the UK in 2019 over concerns that it contributes to marine plastic pollution.

In 2020, Fauna & Flora called on governments worldwide to adopt a moratorium on all deep sea mining, citing its impact on marine life and launched a campaign calling for $500 billion per year to be invested in protecting wildlife.

== See also ==
- Arabian oryx reintroduction
- International Gorilla Conservation Programme
- Oryx (journal)
- Ol Pejeta Conservancy
- Siamese crocodile
