= Wildlife of Ratanakiri =

Flora and fauna of Ratanakiri

Ratanakiri Province in northeastern Cambodia is home to many species of animals. One 1996 survey of an area to the northwest of Lomphat Wildlife Sanctuary recorded 44 mammals, 76 birds, and 9 reptile species. The following is an incomplete list of species recorded in Ratanakiri.

== Mammals ==
- Sambar deer (Cervus unicolor)
- Sun bear (Ursus malayanus)
- Boar (Sus scrofa)
- Bengal slow loris (Nycticebus bengalensis)
- Muntjac (Muntiacus)
- Banteng (Bos javanicus)
- Asian elephant (Elephas maximus)
- Tiger (Panthera tigris) now extirpated from Ratanakiri
- Leopard (Panthera pardus) now extirpated from Ratanakiri
- Gaur (Bos gaurus)
- Hog deer (Axis porcinus)
- Sunda pangolin (Manis javanica)
- Mice/rats (Khmer: kandol)
- Grey squirrels/possums (Khmer: danghein)
- Squirrels (Sciuridae sp.)
- Malayan porcupine (Hystrix brachyura)
- Otter (Lutra sp.)
- Dhole (Cuon alpinus)
- Musk deer
- Macaque
- Gibbon
- Eld's deer (Cervus eldii)

== Reptiles ==
- Python (Python reticulatus)
- Water monitor (Varanus salvator)
- Asian forest tortoise (Manouria emys)
- Black softshelled turtle (Trionyx cartilageneus)

== Birds ==
- Junglefowl (Gallus)
- Giant ibis (Thaumatibis gigantea)
- Greater adjutant (Leptoptilos dubius)
- Green peafowl (Pavo muticus)

== Fish ==
- Broadhead catfish (Clarias macrocephalus)
- Giant snakehead (Channa micropeltes)
- Striped snakehead (Channa striata)
- Julien's mud carp (Cirrhinus jullieni)
- Silver carp (Hypophthalmichthys molitrix)
- Yellow mystus (Mystus nemurus)
- Red-tailed snakehead (Channa gachua)
- Red-tail barb (Barbonymus altus)
- Common silver barb (Barbonymus gonionotus)
- Eel

== Other ==
- Apple snail (Pila ampullacea)
- Lancaster's freshwater prawn (Macrobrachium lancaster)
