= Wildlife Alliance =

US-based non-profit organization

- Founded: 1995
- Founder: Dr. Suwanna Gauntlett
- Type: 501(c)(3)
- Purpose: Forest and Wildlife Conservation
- Location(s): New York and Cambodia
- Region served: Cambodia
- Method: train and equip park rangers to fight crimes against nature, improve the management of protected areas, support sustainable development initiatives, empower countries to enforce transboundary wildlife regulations
- Key people: Dr. Suwanna Gauntlett, founder and Chief Executive Officer Nick Marx, Director of Wildlife Rescue and Care
- Revenue: $4,469,627 (2011)
- Website: www.wildlifealliance.org

Wildlife Alliance is an international non-profit forest and wildlife conservation organization with current programs in Cambodia. It is headquartered in New York City, with offices in Phnom Penh. The logo of the organization is the Asian elephant, an emblematic species and the namesake for the Southwest Elephant Corridor that Wildlife Alliance saved when it was under intense threat of poaching and habitat destruction in 2001. It is today one of the last remaining unfragmented elephant corridors in Asia. Due to Government rangers' and Wildlife Alliance's intensive anti-poaching efforts, there have been zero elephant killings since 2006. Dr. Suwanna Gauntlett is the Founder and Chief Executive Officer of Wildlife Alliance, and one of the original founders of WildAid. The organization is governed by a board of directors and an international advisory board that provides guidance on strategy, fundraising, and outreach.

== History and background ==
Wildlife Alliance was founded in 1995 under the name Global Survival Network, and reorganized in 1999 as WildAid. The organization restructured itself again in 2006, dividing the organization's programs between two organizations – a new separate WildAid conducting the Active Conservation Awareness Program, Shark Conservation, and Galapagos Islands programs and Wildlife Alliance conducting field operations in Southeast Asia and Russia.

== Programs ==
Wildlife Alliance's major ongoing programs are:

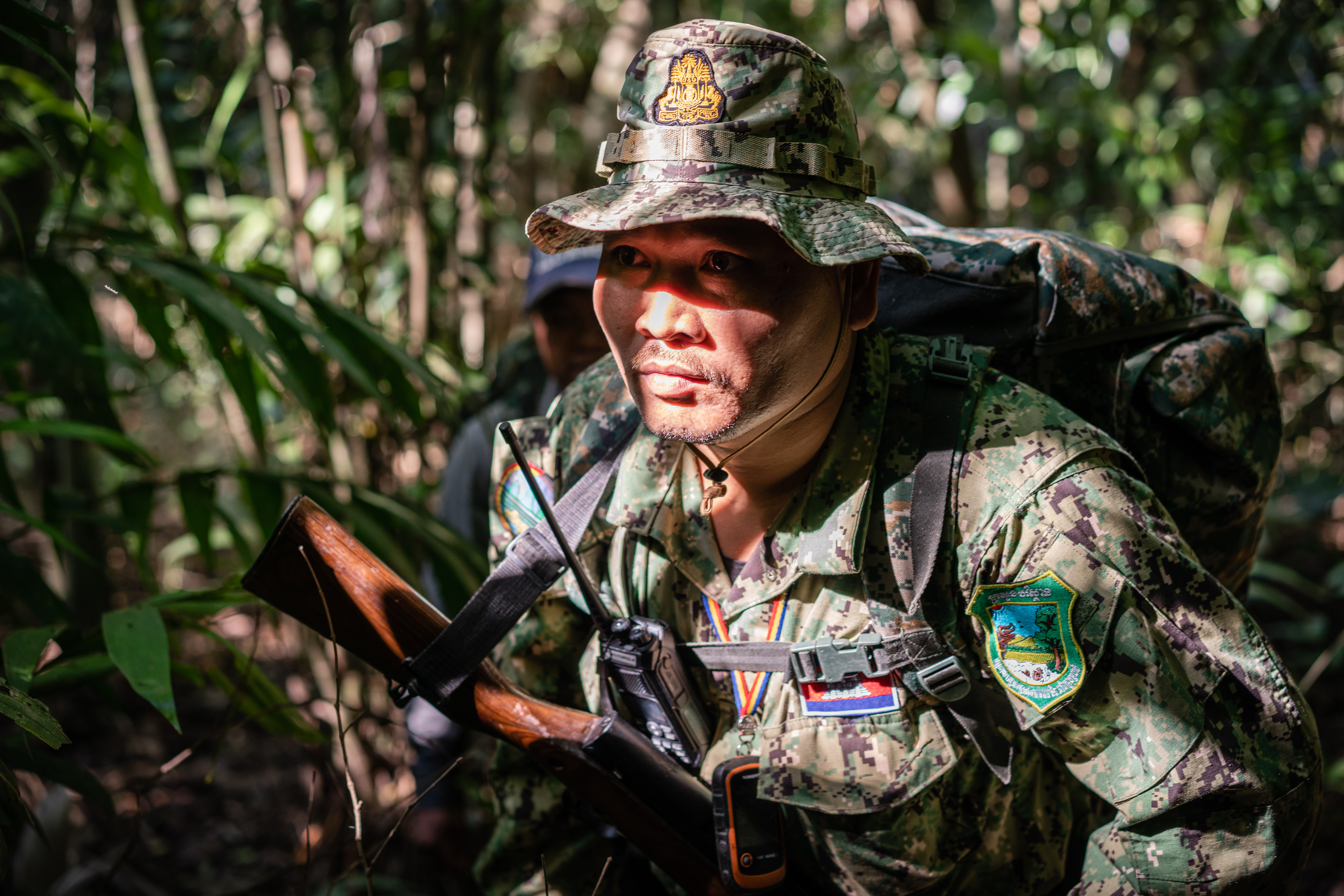
A Wildlife Alliance – Ministry of Environment ranger on patrol in the Cardamom Mountains

Cardamom Forest Protection Program – Ministry of Environment rangers patrol 1,400,000 hectares of the Cardamom Rainforest Landscape in partnership with the Royal Government of Cambodia, making the Cardamom Mountains Rainforest the best protected rainforest in Southeast Asia. Twelve ranger stations are staffed with 14 rangers per station; 4 Ministry of Environment Judicial Police rangers, 8 Royal Gendarmerie Rangers, and 2 Wildlife Alliance staff. The rangers conduct daily patrols stopping land grabbing, dismantling illegal logger and poachers camps, seizing illegal timber and vehicles, stopping people clearing the forest, seizing bulldozers, excavators and other forest clearing vehicles, removing snares, saving live wildlife. Before the program started, 38 elephants and 29 tigers had been killed. Thanks to successful ranger patrolling, there has been zero elephant poaching in the Cardamoms since 2006.

Zoning and Demarcation – Wildlife Alliance facilitates clear delineation of strictly protected forest zones versus community land where farmers can develop agriculture. The combination of a participatory planning process and the installation of visible posts on the ground has greatly helped in reducing land grabbing and deforestation.

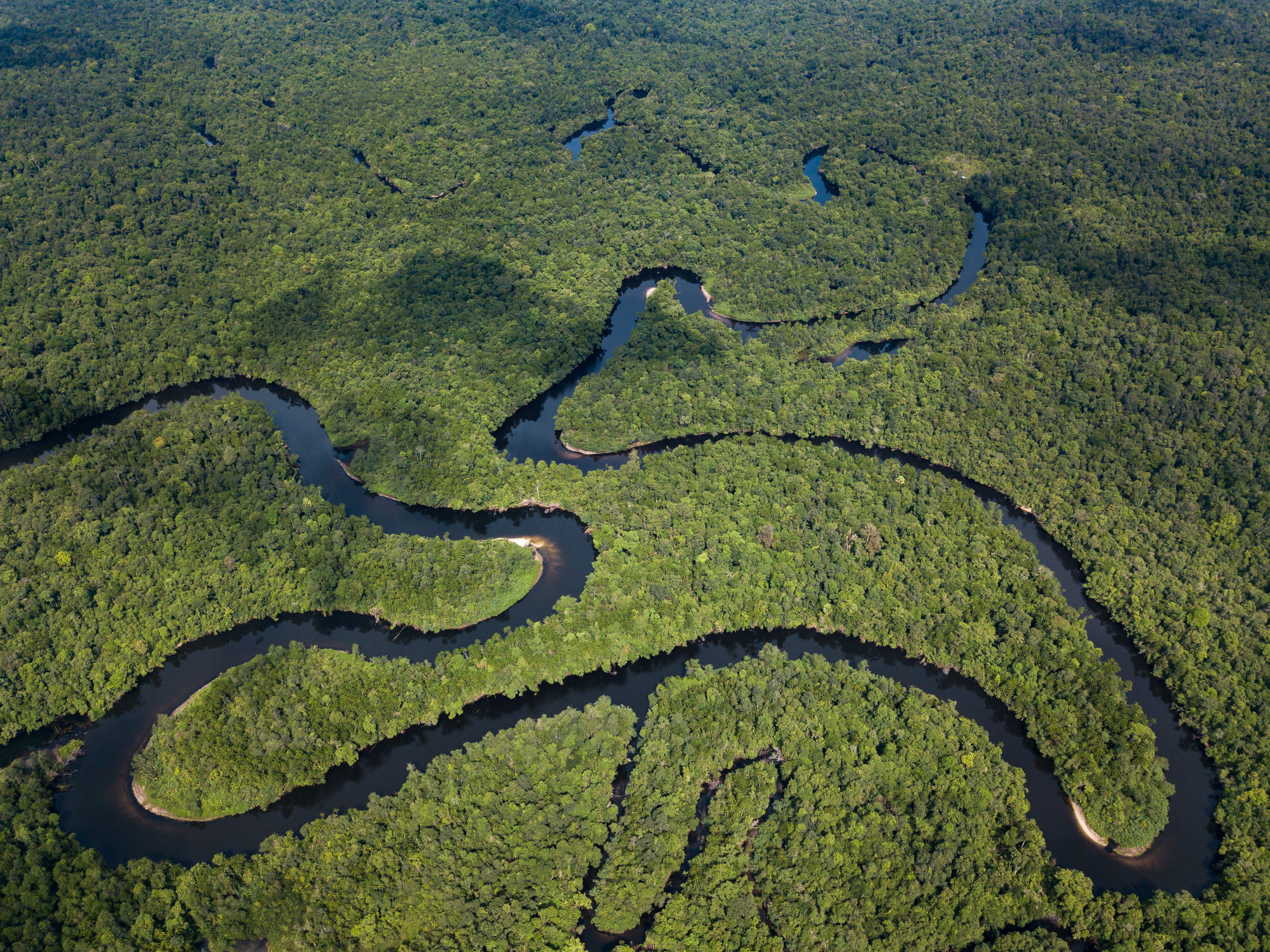
Wildlife Alliance protect 1.4 million hectares of the Cardamom Mountains.

Care for Rescued Wildlife – Since 2001, Wildlife Alliance's Care for Rescued Wildlife program has ensured that all rescued wildlife unfit for immediate release is given expert treatment, natural enclosures, a healthy diet, and trained veterinarian care for as long as necessary. Working at Phnom Tamao Wildlife Rescue Centre, the staff have built large natural enclosures and designed excellent care protocols for the now 1,500 animals in their care. Wildlife Alliance has also created a Wildlife Rehabilitation Station in Koh Kong Province where animals that are deemed suitable for release into the wild are relocated to a forested enclosure in an appropriate area of habitat. Utilizing a soft release method, when the animals are ready for release, the door to the enclosure is left open and the animals are free to leave at will. Wildlife Alliance continues to provide hands-off assistance and supplementary food at the enclosure location for as long as it is necessary. In 2013, Wildlife Alliance established its Angkor Wildlife Release Program in cooperation with Apsara Authority and the Forestry Administration. To-date several threatened and endangered species have been released into the forest around the temples: four pairs of endangered pileated gibbons who then gave birth to seven babies, Silver Langurs, red muntjacs, elongated tortoises, common palm civets, leopard cats, smooth-coated otters, green pea-fowl, oriental pied hornbills, great hornbills and red hornbills.

Wildlife Rapid Rescue Team (WRRT) – A law enforcement unit devoted solely to combating the illegal wildlife trade, led by the Cambodian Forestry Administration judicial officers, supported by the Royal Gendarmerie of Cambodia Military Police, with technical and financial support from Wildlife Alliance. The team has a national mandate to stop the illegal wildlife trade in all provinces, in urban centers, on roads, in markets and restaurants, and along the border. As of 2020, the Wildlife Rapid Rescue Team has rescued more than 77,000 live animals, arrested 3500 traffickers, and seized several tons of wildlife parts for traditional medicine and bushmeat for restaurants. As a result, the work of WRRT has gained recognition as Asia's foremost wildlife law enforcement units, receiving the ''Best Wildlife Law Enforcement Unit in Asia Award'' from the United Nations Environment Programme in 2015. WRRT also cracks down on the transnational illegal wildlife trade that involves Thailand, Vietnam and African countries. In 2018, WRRT was involved in the seizure of a shipment of 3.4 tons of ivory originating from the Mozambique port of Nacala. In 2020, in response to the COVID-19 outbreak and its links to the wildlife trade, Wildlife Alliance launched the #StopEatingWildlife campaign to fight the supply, demand, and consumption of wildlife meat by making Cambodian consumers more aware of the health risks of eating wildlife and how the trade supports the brutal snaring crisis of Cambodia’s wildlife.

Community Agriculture Development Project – The Community Agriculture Development Project in Sovanna Baitong focuses on improving the livelihoods of smuggled wildlife into /Vietnam and Chin220 families who were previously destroying the rainforest through slash-and-burn cultivation and hunting wildlife. With the technical and financial assistance of Wildlife Alliance, villagers are managing an Agriculture Store and Community Agriculture Association that oversees agriculture production, marketing of goods, health care, education, natural resource conservation, a savings program and a micro-credit system. More than 85% of the families now earn well above the initial goal of monthly revenues and many households have reached middle-income status.

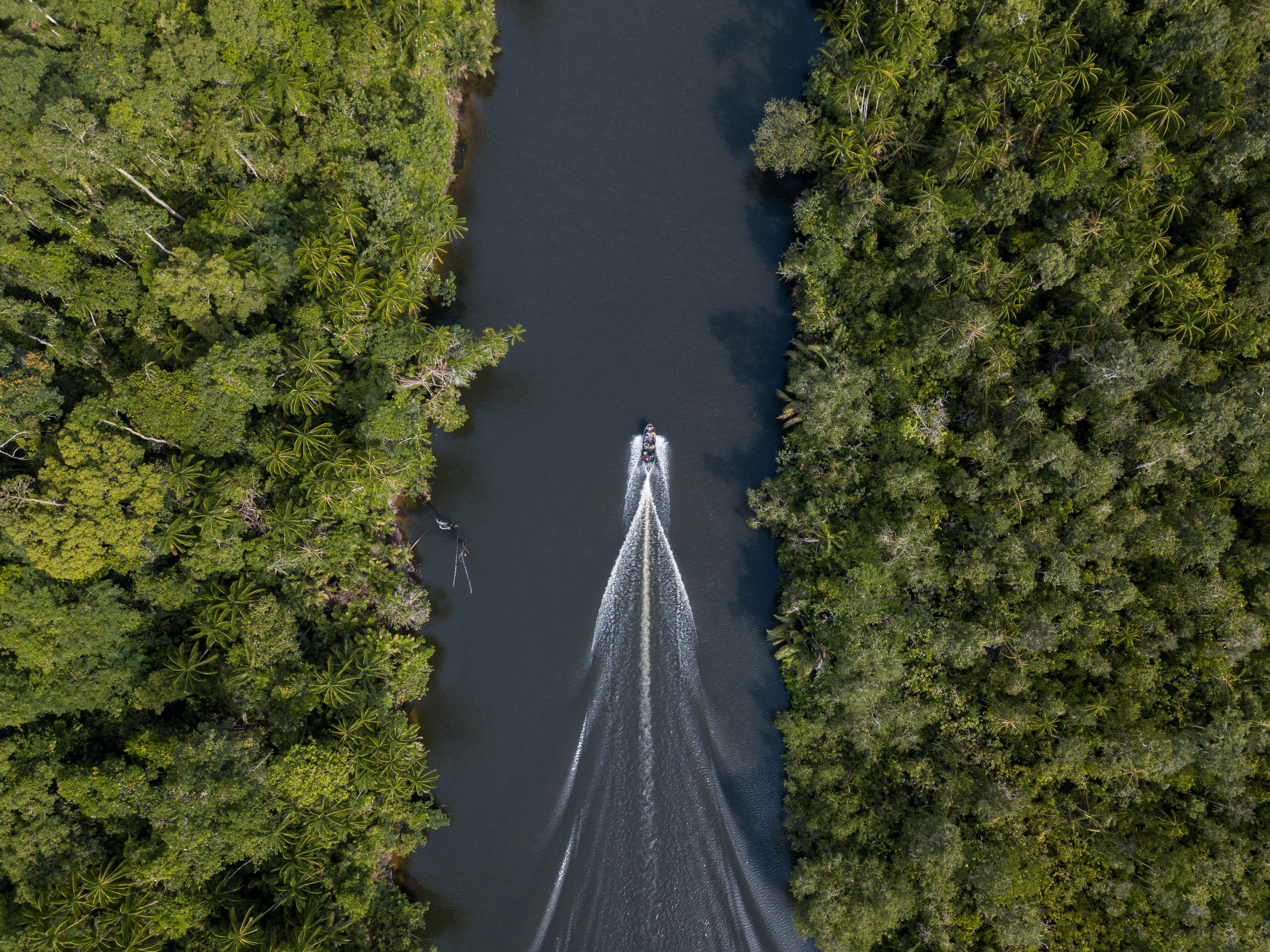
Ministry of Environment rangers patrol the Cardamom Rainforest 24/7 365 days by boat, land, and by air.

Community Based Ecotourism – Wildlife Alliance has established Community-Based Ecotourism (CBET) projects in both Chi Phat and Steung Areng. The organization has provided technical assistance in facilitating the community’s planning process, design of the management system, decision-making processes, roles and responsibilities of the management committee and service groups, agreeing on procedures and how income will be allocated.[18] Wildlife Alliance has also provided the initial investment to retrofit and upgrade homestays and guesthouses, purchase trekking equipment, kayaks and mountain bikes, and create 200 km of rainforest trekking trails with 4 night camps. It has built a community center with guest reception, bookings, cashier, restaurant, and rental service for trekking equipment. Families have stopped 100% forest slash-and-burn practices and are now earning sustainable income from international tourism. Visitors come from all over the world to go on treks in the Cardamom rainforest, enjoy river kayaking or mountain biking, and stay at community guesthouses. Due to its success, the well-established Chi Phat CBET has won multiple international awards, including the Dubai International Award for Best Practices to Improve the Living Environment in 2014.

Kouprey Express In 2001, Wildlife Alliance launched a national awareness campaign to stop Cambodian consumers from eating wildlife and buying wild animals for exotic pets. In 2005, the organization created the Kouprey Express Mobile Environmental Education Project (KE) to address the lack of effective environmental education in Cambodia, raising awareness among communities living in and around protected areas, and providing guidance on how to live sustainably without depleting natural resources. The KE travels throughout the country to work with students, teachers and community adults. It delivers interactive educational classes in the mornings and provides edu-entertainment night shows in the evenings for the community. Consisting of a school-based curriculum that builds capacities of both students and teachers, a national awareness campaign, and whole community engagement, the KE highlights the many factors which threaten rainforests, wildlife and our climate: intense poaching, land grabbing, illegal logging. The education unit also addresses water quality, waste management and recycling.

== Affiliations ==
Wildlife Alliance is partnered with the FREELAND Foundation and the Russian Phoenix Fund. Wildlife Alliance is also a member of the International Union for Conservation of Nature, the Association of Southeast Asian Nations Wildlife Enforcement Network, Global Sustainable Tourism Council, Wildlife Conservation Network and the International Union for Conservation of Nature. The organization has conducted fieldwork in Asia in cooperation with Fauna and Flora International, Conservation International, Traffic (conservation programme), and other international conservation organizations. In 2009, Fauna and Flora International and Wildlife Alliance famously conducted an operation that destroyed 18 safrole oil factories in the remote Cardamom Mountains, a key ingredient in the production of MDMA. A single raid in June 2009 destroyed enough oil to produce 44 million ecstasy tablets, causing a disruption of supplies to the UK market.

== Significant landmarks ==
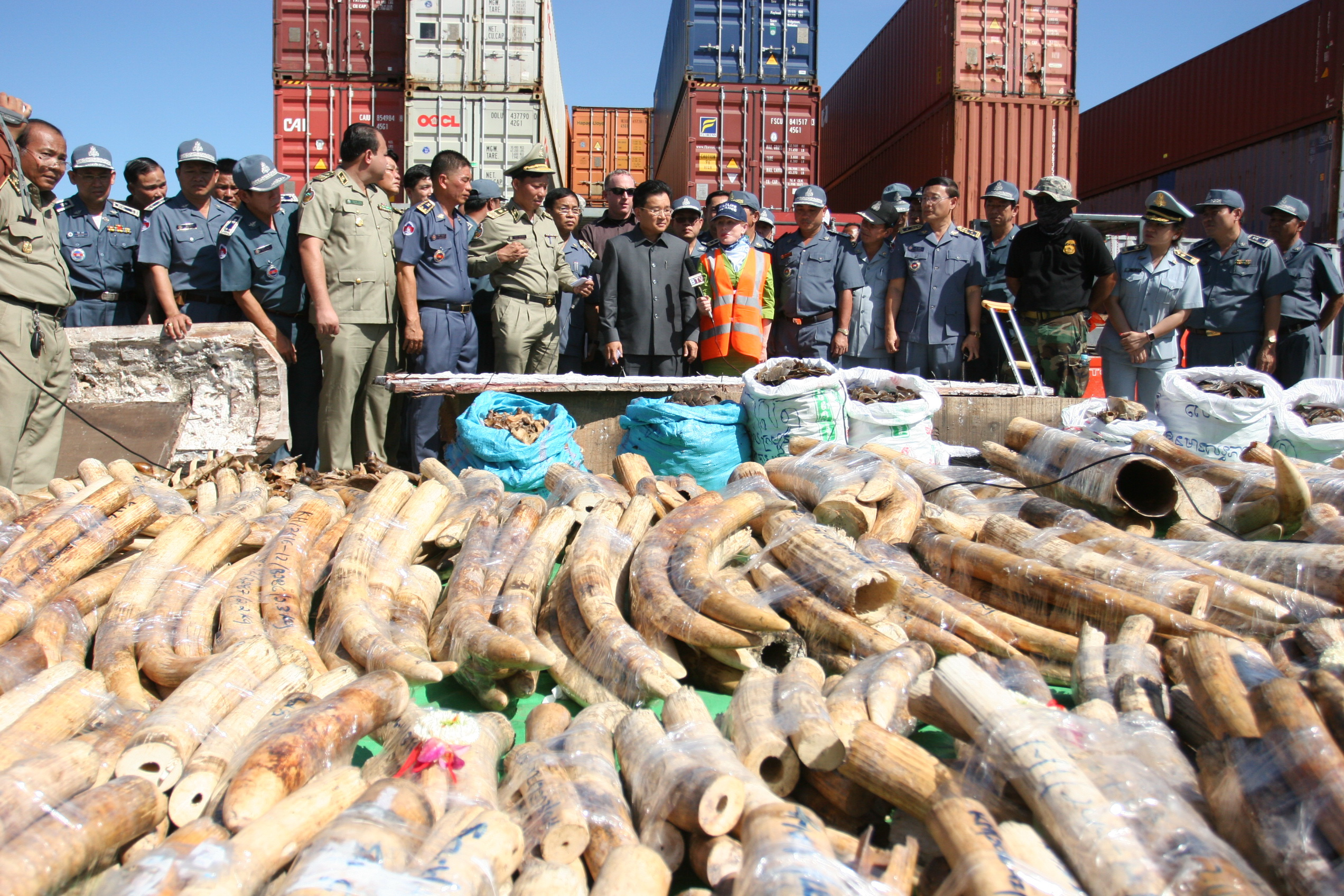
In 2017, Wildlife Alliance seized more than 3 tonnes of Ivory from Mozambique in cooperation with the Cambodian Authorities. It is Cambodia's biggest ever ivory bust.

- 1995 – Founding of Global Survival Network;
- 1997 – Global Survival Network partners with Russian conservationists to launch the Phoenix Fund, a Vladivostok-based non-profit dedicated to protecting the Amur leopard, Siberian tiger, and their habitat and ecology;
- 2000 – Launch of Care for Rescued Wildlife program at Phnom Tamao Wildlife Rescue Centre, to provide veterinarian treatment, rehabilitation and lifetime care for animals rescued from the illegal wildlife trade;
- 2000 – The Cambodian Forestry Administration and Wildlife Alliance confiscate 7 tigers in a STING operation;
- 2001 – Wildlife Alliance creates the only full-time wildlife law enforcement unit in Asia, known as the Wildlife Rapid Rescue Team (WRRT) with judicial authority over all of Cambodia’s provinces, including national roads and urban centers. It has the legal mandate to arrest traffickers, seize trafficked wildlife, deliver penalties and take cases to the courts;
- 2002 – Establishment of the Cardamom Forest Protection Program;
- 2004 – Government of Thailand calls for regional wildlife law enforcement network to address Southeast Asia's role as a shipment hub for illegal wildlife products. The ultimate result is the creation of the ASEAN Wildlife Enforcement Network, of which Wildlife Alliance led the NGO support program from 2005 to 2008;
- 2005 – Initial assessment of wildlife and habitat threats in Gunung Leuser National Park, Indonesia. When the Boxing Day tsunami devastates the region weeks later, WildAid returns to conduct a post-tsunami assessment to help Indonesian government agencies respond to the crisis;
- 2006 – Phoenix Fund Director, Sergei Beruznuk, wins a £30,000 Whitley Award recognizing his "outstanding achievements in nature conservation" related to re-routing an oil pipeline away from the habitat of critically endangered Amur leopard;
- 2007 – Original WildAid changes name to Wildlife Alliance. CNN's Anderson Cooper 360° series, Planet in Peril, features Wildlife Alliance programs in Thailand and Cambodia, including Care for Rescued Wildlife, Bokor National Park, and efforts to stop the illegal wildlife trade in Asia;
- 2008 – Wildlife Alliance launches Community-Based Ecotourism program in the four villages of the commune of Chi Phat, Cambodia;
- 2008 – Launches reforestation project to reconnect the fragmented rainforest in the Cardamom Mountains;
- 2009 – MSNBC and Jeff Corwin visit Cambodia to film Wildlife Alliance field projects for the 100 Heartbeats documentary;
- 2010 – The Wildlife Rapid Rescue Team gains official recognition from ten Asian countries as Cambodia’s national-level wildlife crime taskforce when the Cambodian Forestry Administration actively implements the Association of South East Asian Nations Wildlife Enforcement Network (ASEAN-WEN) in Cambodia;
- 2011 – Cambodian government reverses plan to construct titanium mine in the Cardamom Mountains Rainforest, in light of online petitions and advocacy led by Wildlife Alliance;
- 2012 – Wildlife Alliance releases their iPhone app created in collaboration with TRAFFIC, and Jeff Corwin Connect to allow users learn more about Cambodia's endangered wildlife and help the Wildlife Rapid Rescue Team stop the wildlife trade;
- 2013 – Wildlife Alliance launches the ASEAN-WEN Wildlife Anti-Trafficking Campaign in Cambodian Airports;
- 2016 – Wildlife Alliance's fourteen years of work to protect the only swath of the Cardamom Rainforest Landscape that had so far remained without legal status (an area of rainforest of 443.134 hectares) resulted in the nomination of the Southern Cardamom National Park;
- 2017 – Wildlife Alliance launches Community-Based Ecotourism program in the eight villages of Chhay Areng Valley;
- 2017 – WRRT seizes 3 tonnes of Ivory from Mozambique;
- 2019 – Wildlife Alliance provides training and funds to support a 16-men community patrol team in Phnom Chongreak working to protect the endangered Bantengs;
- 2019 – The Southern Cardamom REDD+ (a partnership Ministry of Environment and Wildlife Alliance) starts sales of carbon credits (Verified Emissions Reductions, VERs) to companies in Europe and the United States;
- 2020 – 1.4 million hectares of the Cardamom Mountains Rainforest remain protected.
