= Sansi =

Sansi may refer to:

- Sansi people, an ethnic group of India
- Sansi language, an Indo-Aryan language
- Sansi, Benin, in Borgou Department, Benin
- Sansi Township, Xingtai, Hebei, China
- Three Bureaus (三司; Sānsī), an office in imperial Chinese governments
- Wu Sansi (died 707), Chinese official

== See also ==
- Sanci (disambiguation)
- Sancy (disambiguation)
- Sanzi, contemporary Chinese painter and designer
