= Xiaolong =

Xiaolong is a Chinese given name and may refer to:

- Chen Xiaolong (born 1988), Ashton Chen, stage name Shi Xiaolong, Chinese actor and martial artist
- Li Xiaolong (1940–1973), known as Bruce Lee, Hong Kong-American actor, director, martial artist, martial arts instructor and philosopher
- Liang Xiaolong (born 1948), Hong Kong actor who has appeared in many martial arts movies
- Liu Xiaolong (born 1988), male Chinese badminton player who is a doubles specialist
- Liu Xiaolong (footballer) (born 1989), Chinese football player
- Qiu Xiaolong (born 1953), English-language poet, literary translator, crime novelist, critic, and academic
- Wang Xiaolong (born 1986), Chinese footballer
- Wang Xiaolong (artist) (born 1965), contemporary Chinese painter and designer
- Wang Xiaolong (handballer) (born 1989), Chinese handball player who competed in the 2008 Summer Olympics
- Xu Xiaolong (born 1992), Chinese triple jumper
- Xu Xiaolong (footballer) (born 1989), Chinese footballer
- Yin Xiaolong (born 1985), Chinese football player
- Zhang Xiaolong, also known as Allen Zhang, Chinese programmer known for creating WeChat and Foxmail
- Zheng Xiaolong (born 1953), Chinese TV and film director and screenwriter

== See also ==
- Xiaolongbao, type of Chinese steamed bun (baozi) from the Jiangnan region
- CAC FC-1 Xiaolong, a lightweight, single-engine, multi-role combat aircraft
- Xiaolongnü, fictional female protagonist of the wuxia novel The Return of the Condor Heroes by Jin Yong
- Xiaolong Automotive Technologies Co., Ltd, a Chinese tactical wheeled vehicle manufacturer
