= Nanhe =

Nanhe may refer to:

- Nanhe Jaisalmer, 2007 film
- Nanhe County (南和县), of Xingtai, Hebei, China

Towns (南河镇)

- Nanhe, Gucheng County, Hubei, in Gucheng County, Hubei, China
- Nanhe, Yingshan County, in Yingshan County, Huanggang, Hubei, China
- Nanhe, Xiangshui County, in Xiangshui County, Jiangsu, China
