= Ranjatai =

Famous piece of agarwood used for incense

- 蘭奢待
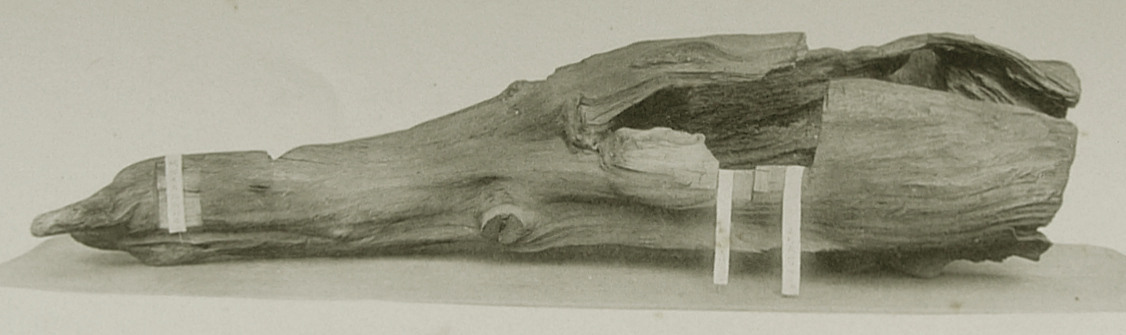
- Type: Incense
- Material: Agarwood
- Length: 156 centimetres (61 in)
- Width: 42 centimetres (17 in)
- Weight: 11,600 grams (25.6 lb)
- Created: between 772 and 885
- Period/culture: Nara period
- Present location: Shosoin
- Identification: 中倉135

The Ranjatai (Japanese: 蘭奢待) is a log of fragrant agarwood currently placed in the Shōsōin repository in the Tōdai-ji. The wood was first imported into Japan during the Nara period in the 8th century. It is considered a famous piece of incense wood due to its proximity and circumstance of the spread of Japanese Buddhism. It is claimed to have been placed in the repository by Empress Kōmyō in memory of Emperor Shōmu.

It currently remains under the ownership of the Shōsōin under the Imperial Household Agency and is displayed occasionally at the Nara National Museum as part of the repository's annual exhibit. It is catalogued as 中倉135 (Middle Section 135) in the warehouse.

== Origin ==
Agarwood is produced when an Aquilaria tree—a lign aloe from Southeast Asia—is infected with certain fungi as part of the tree's immune defense. A resin forms in the heartwood that produces a pleasing fragrance when heated. The wood, normally produced in present day Vietnam, Cambodia, and Indonesia, saw high demand and trade through the Silk Road during antiquity. The incense wood was sometimes accorded special significance and is referenced in Hindu texts, Buddhist texts and the Abrahamic religions, including parashah Balak.

The significance of agarwood in Japan came together with the arrival of Buddhism from China during the Asuka period. In the Nihon Shoki, the earliest reference to incense was recorded with the commissioning of two Buddha sculptures in 553. In 595, a piece of agarwood washed upon the shores of Awaji Island. The locals, upon realizing the wood's unusual fragrance, presented the wood to Empress Suiko. Agarwood became an integral part of Buddhist tribute in the following years, along with other incenses such as sandalwood.

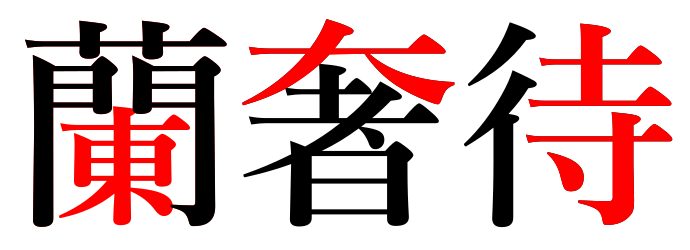
The name of the Tōdai-ji (red) within the characters of the Ranjatai.

The Ranjatai, originally called the Ojukuko, was said to have arrived in Japan during the Nara period, provided from the Tang court to Emperor Shōmu and then transferred by Empress Kōmyō to the Shōsōin repository afterwards. The Ranjatai measures 1.56 meters (5 ft 1 in) and weighs 11.6 kg (26 lb). Radiocarbon dating conducted by the Imperial Household Agency in July 2025 determined that the wood was felled sometime between to 772 to 885 in Southeast Asia, contrary to the belief that it was given to Tōdai-ji during the consecration of its Daibutsuden (Great Buddha Hall).

It was deliberately named to include the characters in the name of the Tōdai-ji (東大寺, "Great Eastern Temple") into its name without being directly named after the temple. The name of the Ranjatai denotes luxury and anticipation.

Its fragrance is said to be described as a "pungent", with a balance between "bitterness and gracefulness".

In 2024, the Shōsōin office in collaboration with the Takasago International Corporation conducted component analysis to revive and replicate the fragrance of the wood, based on a fragment "1 mm wide and few mm long" (approximately 1/32 inch by 1/8 inch).

== Trimmings ==
Throughout Japan's history, the Ranjatai has seen 50 trimmings off of the log, for ceremonial usage, according to a study of the wood in 1997. Some fragments of the wood extracted for example are held by the Tachibana Museum (derived from Daitoku-ji and gifted to the Tachibana clan), and the Tokugawa Art Museum (provenanced to Minamoto no Yorimasa).

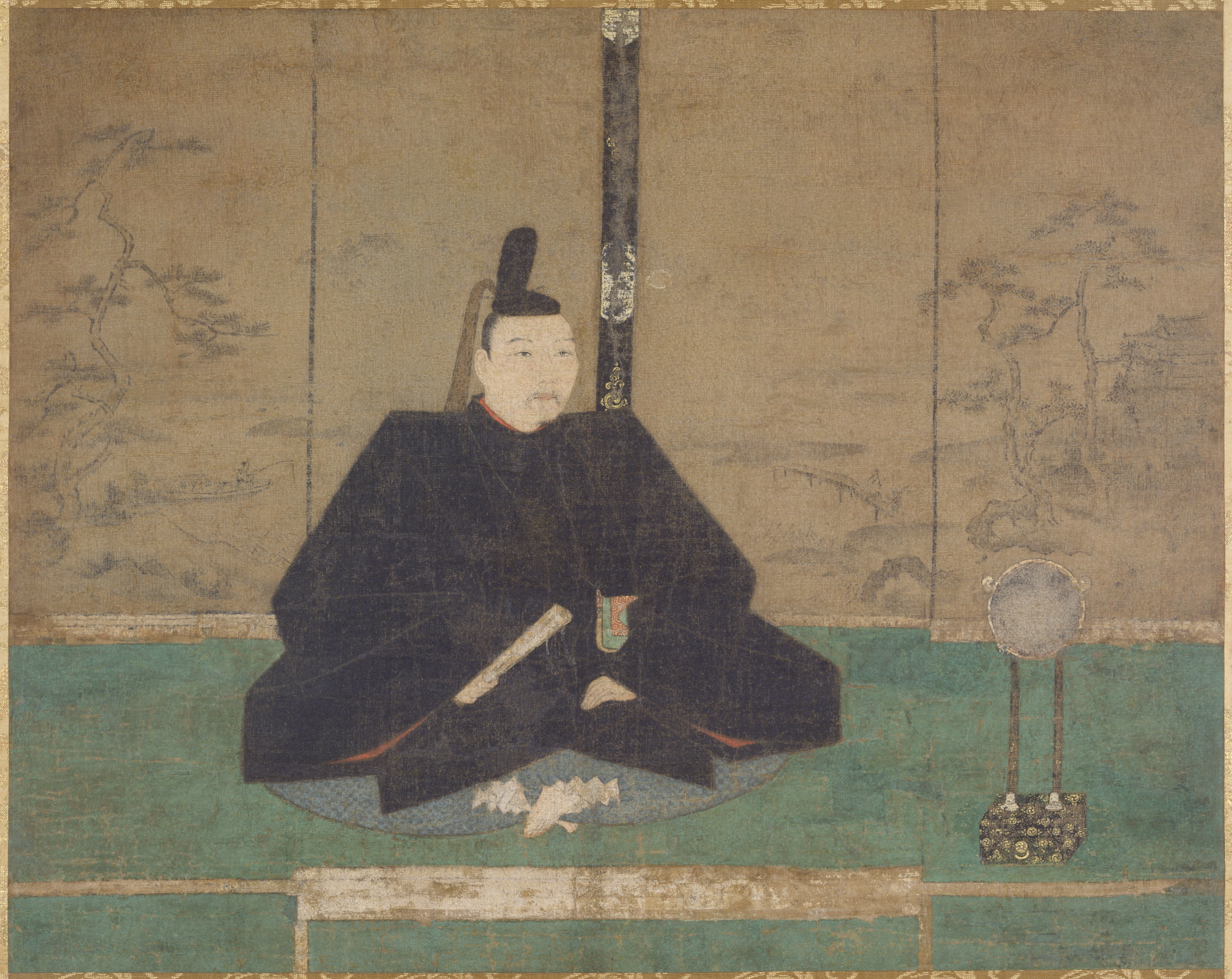
Ashikaga Yoshimasa

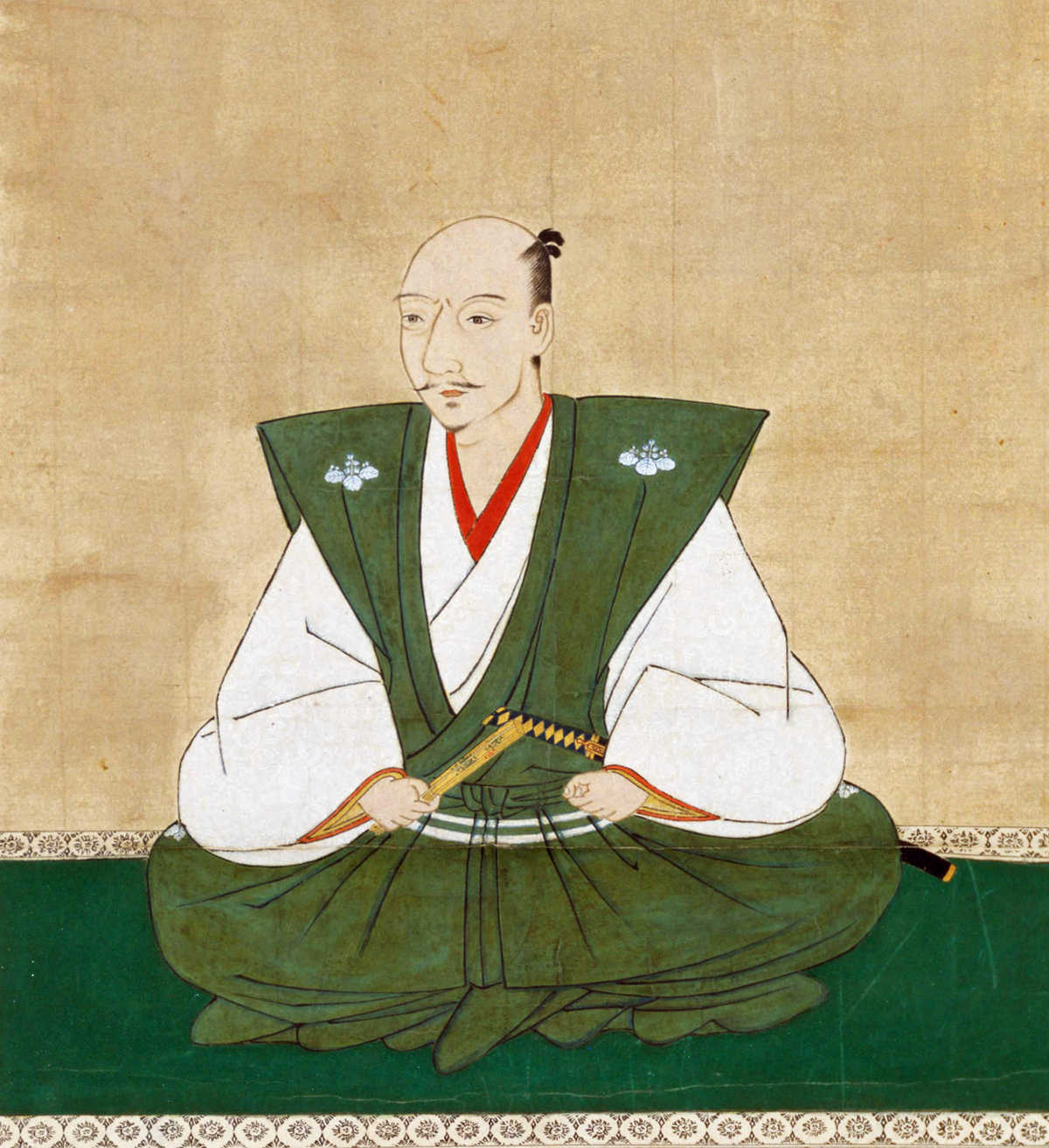
Oda Nobunaga

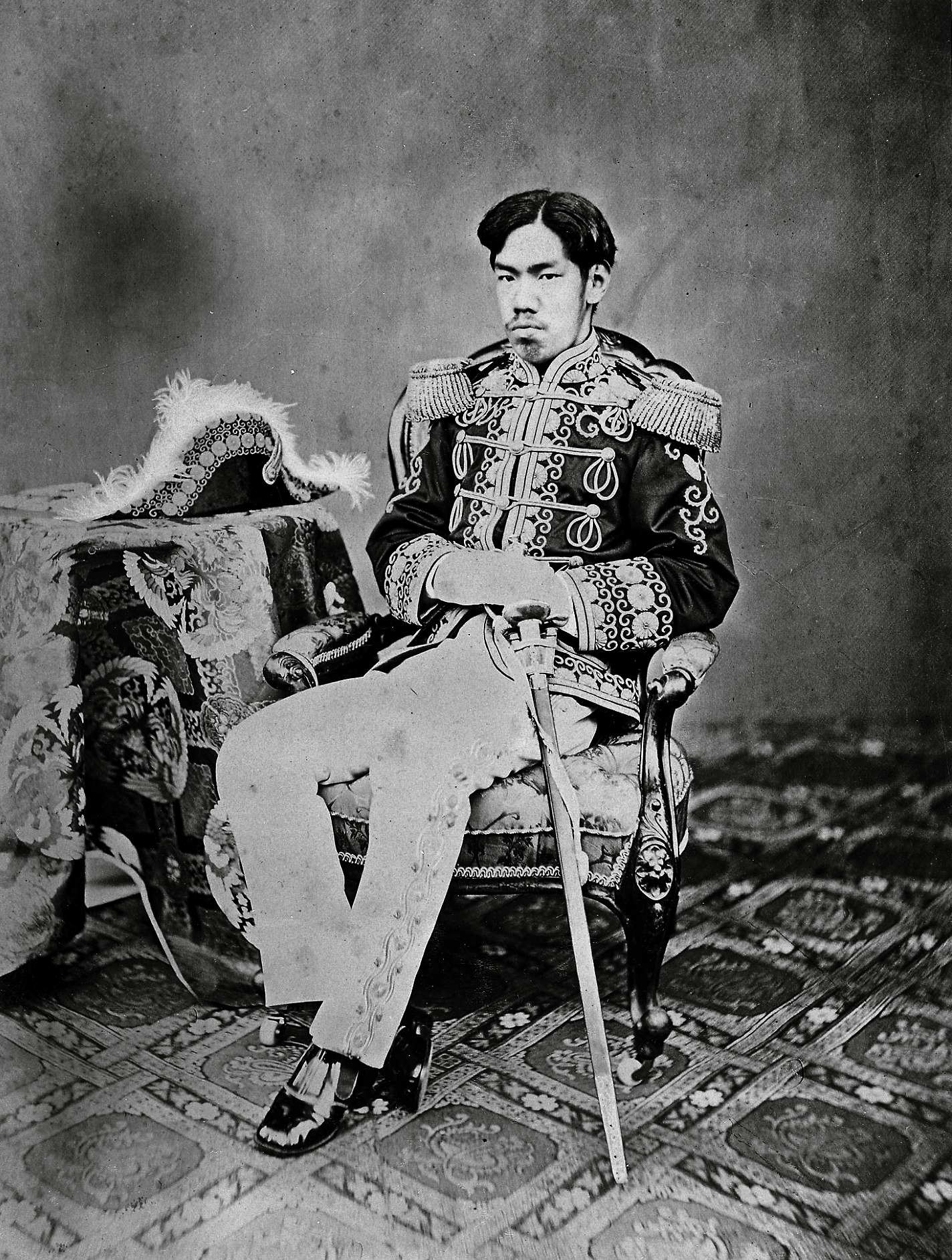
Emperor Meiji

The largest cuts on the Ranjatai log are labelled, attesting to extractions by Ashikaga Yoshimasa, Oda Nobunaga, and Emperor Meiji.

In 24 September 1465, two 2.5 cm (1 in) square pieces were extracted as Yoshimasa viewed the treasures of the Shōsōin, following the precedent of previous usage of the wood in ceremonies by previous shoguns Ashikaga Yoshimitsu and Yoshinori. An additional piece measuring 5-bu (approximately 1.5 cm^{2} or 0.23 sq in) was presented to the chief priest of Tōdai-ji.

In 23 March 1574, with Imperial permissions, Oda Nobunaga viewed the Shōsōin for the first time since the fall of the Ashikaga shogunate. On 28 March, a 5 cm (2 in) long piece of it was cut off. Subsequently on 3 April, an elaborate tea ceremony was hosted in Shōkoku-ji, Kyoto with merchant and tea masters Imai Sōkyū, Tsuda Sōgyū, and Sen no Rikyū. This was also held in gratitude by Oda for the prevention of rebellion in Sakai.

In the Meiji Tenno Ki, Emperor Meiji trimmed off a fragment weighing 8.9 g (0.31 oz) and split the pieces into two, one for himself and another to be burned to enjoy the fragrance.

== Exhibition ==
The wood is displayed periodically at the annual Shōsōin exhibits held by the Nara National Museum, which saw public display in 1997 and 2011 as well as a display in 2019 that commemorated the coronation of Naruhito.

From June to November 2025, visitors are able to sample the fragrance from the Ranjatai in an immersive exhibit about Shōsōin on tour from the Osaka Museum of History to the Ueno Royal Museum.
