= Sanci =

Sanci may refer to:

- Sānci, the Assamese name for Aquilaria malaccensis
- Sancı, Alaca, a village in Turkey
- Sanchi, an ancient Buddhist complex in India
- Sancy, a diamond

== See also ==
- Sansi (disambiguation)
- Sanchipat
