= A. sinensis =

A. sinensis may refer to:

- Angelica sinensis, the "dong quai" or female ginseng, a herb species indigenous to China
- Aquilaria sinensis, a plant species endemic to China
- Alligator sinensis, an alligator species endemic to China

== See also ==
- Flora Sinensis
