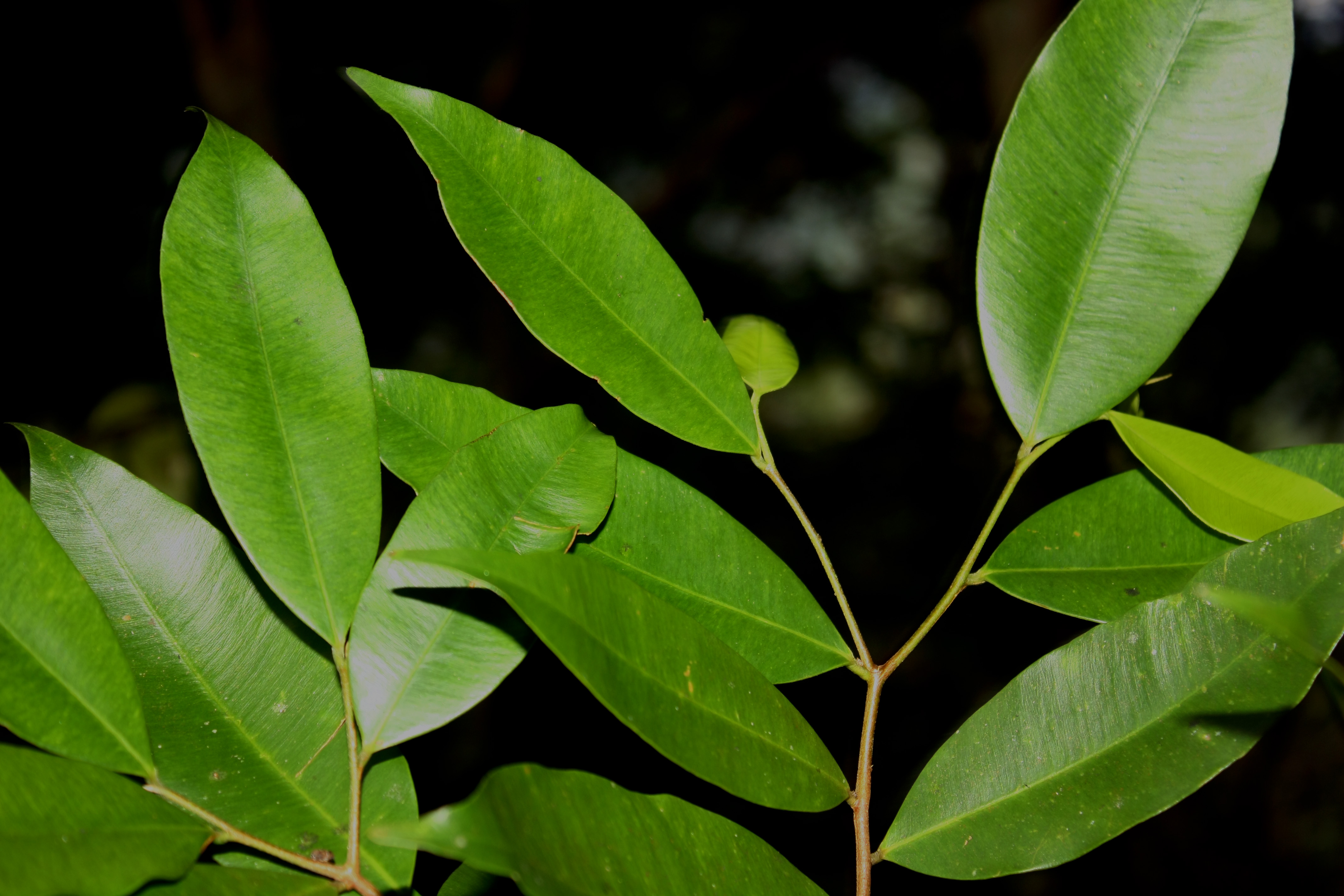

Conservation status
- Vulnerable (IUCN 3.1)

Scientific classification
- Kingdom: Plantae
- Clade: Tracheophytes
- Clade: Angiosperms
- Clade: Eudicots
- Clade: Rosids
- Order: Malvales
- Family: Thymelaeaceae
- Genus: Gyrinops
- Species: G. walla

Binomial name
- Gyrinops walla Gaertn.

Synonyms
- Aquilaria walla H.Hallier

= Gyrinops walla =

Species of flowering plant

Gyrinops walla is a species of plant in the family Thymelaeaceae. It was described by Joseph Gaertner. The tree grows up to 15m high. Its bark is thin and brownish-grey color. Leaves are 1-6mm long and yellowish-white flower's pedicels are 3-4mm long.

Gyrinops walla is found in wet zone of Sri Lanka and very rarely in southwest India. It is harvested for agarwood and agarwood resin. The tree has commercial value that resulted to smuggling. In Sri Lanka, it is known as "Wallapatta". Due to the demand of the tree, Sadaharitha Plantations Limited released a study on growing Gyrinops walla in home gardens. Some organizations conducted the research with the support of the Sri Lankan government.

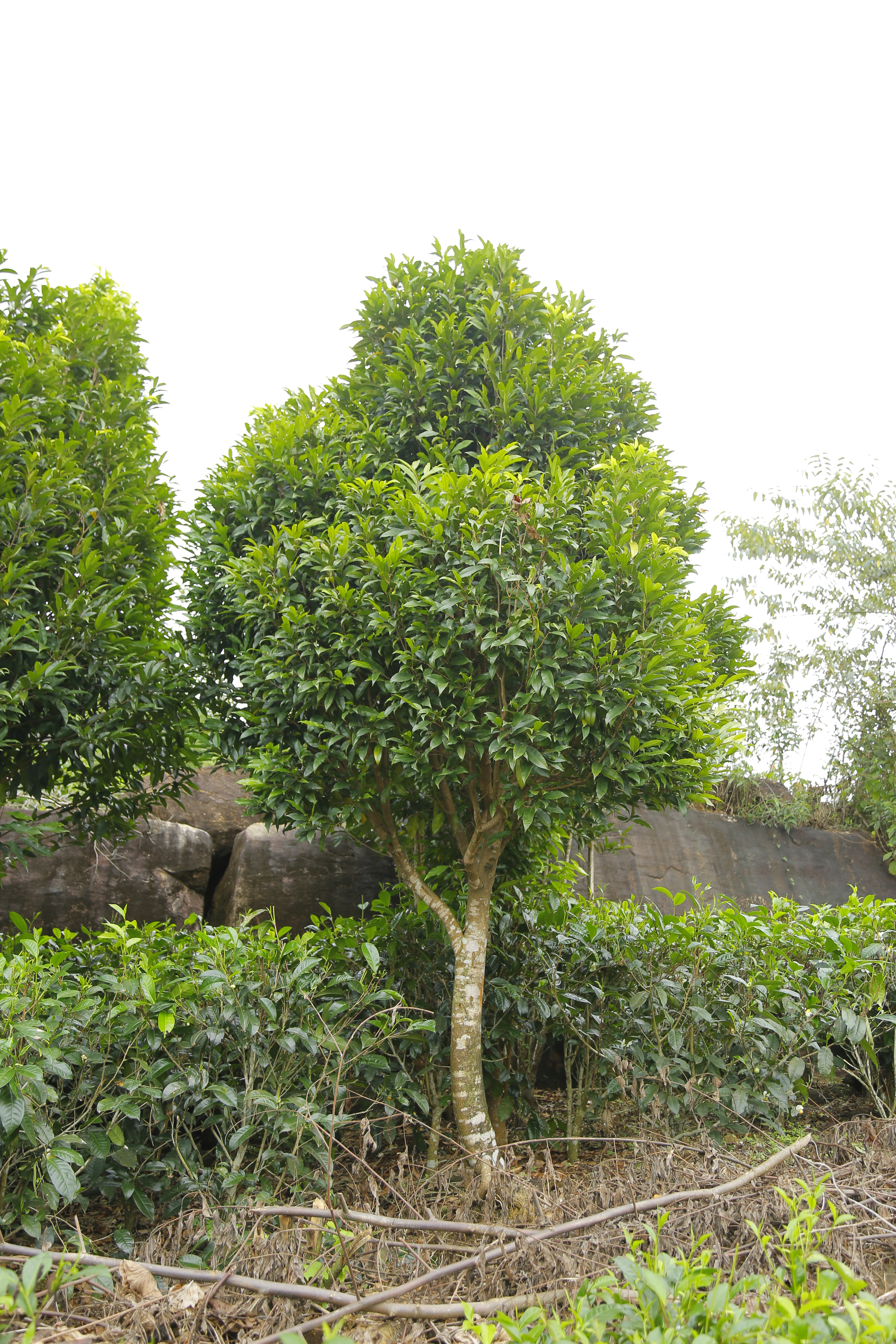
The Gyrinops Walla tree is unique because, unlike its counterpart, the Aquilaria Tree (Agarwood), the branches of the tree are more closely placed; some might even call it bush-like.

The Wallapatta tree an endemic tree of Sri Lanka is known for having significant cultural value in the Middle Eastern market as it was traded when The Silk Road 130 B.C.E. - 1453 C.E. was at its peak of trade and exploration and was coined under the name Silani, which is a nickname given for wallapatta. Although the tree has been classified as an endangered species by The International Union for Conservation of Nature (IUCN) Red List, conglomerates like Pintanna Holdings (Pvt) Ltd. have been identified as a network of companies that is known for growing over 2000 wallapatta plants & trees since 2020 with the effort of replenishing the population of this endangered species and building awareness on the value of preserving the population of the Gyrinops Walla tree. Pintanna also managed to open Sri Lanka's first and only Oud Oil Factory further developing awareness and population of the Gyrinops Walla species.

Gyrinops walla has been assessed as vulnerable on the IUCN Red List, due to its harvesting for agarwood. The species does occur in one protected area of Sri Lanka: Sinharaja Forest Reserve.
