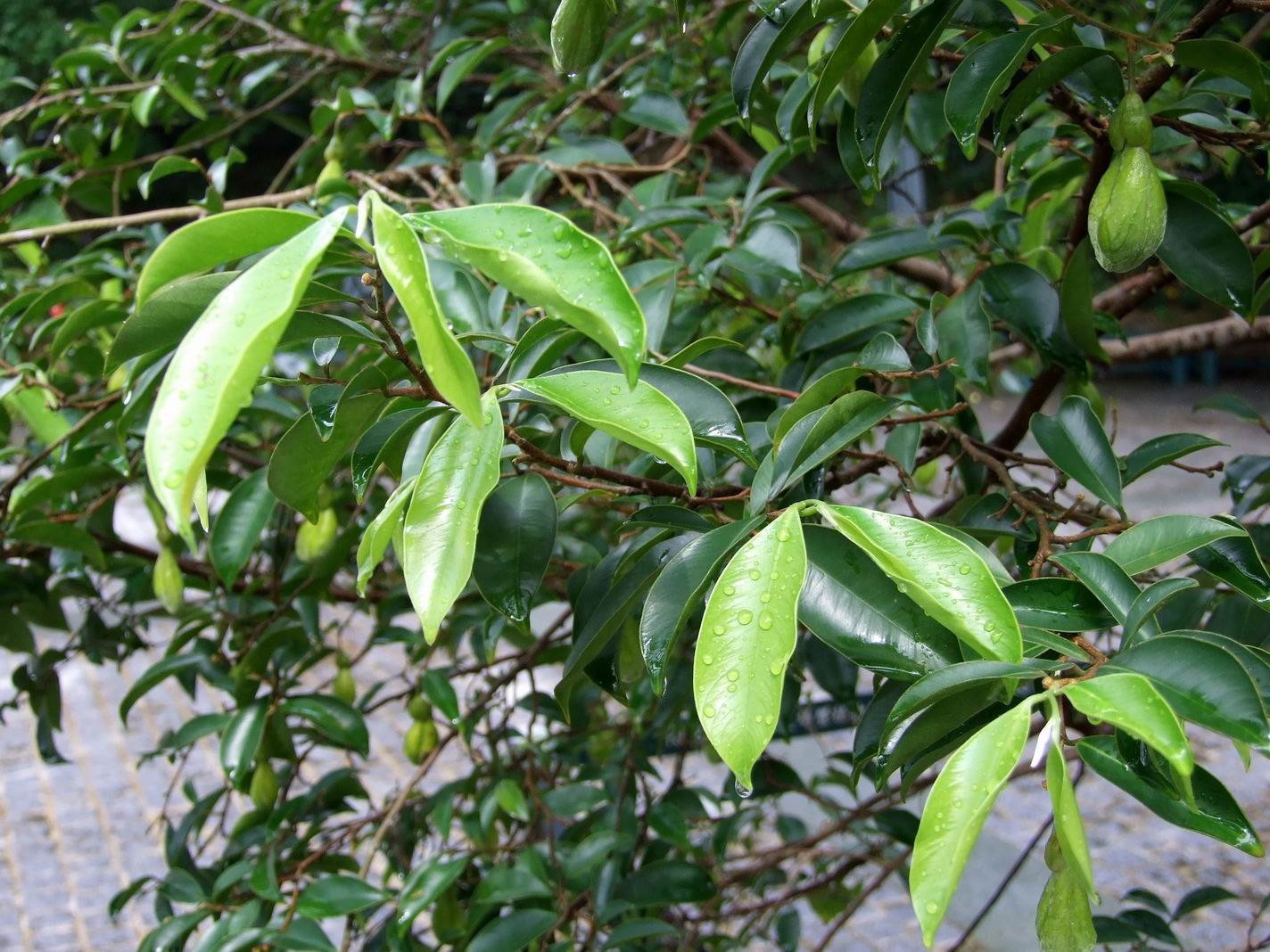

Conservation status
- Vulnerable (IUCN 3.1)

Scientific classification
- Kingdom: Plantae
- Clade: Tracheophytes
- Clade: Angiosperms
- Clade: Eudicots
- Clade: Rosids
- Order: Malvales
- Family: Thymelaeaceae
- Genus: Aquilaria
- Species: A. sinensis

Binomial name
- Aquilaria sinensis (Lour.) Gilg

Synonyms
- Homotypic Synonyms: Agallochum sinense (Lour.) Kuntze; Aquilaria ophispermum Poir.; Ophispermum sinense Lour.; Heterotypic Synonyms: Agallochum grandiflorum (Benth.) Kuntze; Aquilaria chinensis Spreng.; Aquilaria grandiflora Benth.; Aquilaria malaccensis Benth.

= Aquilaria sinensis =

Species of agarwood tree from China

Aquilaria sinensis is a species of flowering plant in the family Thymelaeaceae. It is sometimes referred to by the common names Chinese Agarwood, and Chinese Eaglewood (English), Bai Mu Xiang, Chen Xiang, and Tu Chen Xiang (in China) and A Ga Ru (in Tibet).

== Description ==
Aquilaria sinensis is an evergreen tree, 6 to 20 m tall. The smooth bark is grayish to dark grey, and the wood is white to yellowish – so giving it another Chinese name "Pak Muk Heung" (White Wood Incense). Its branchlets are sparsely covered with hairs when young. Its leaves are alternate, leathery, obovate to elliptic, generally 5 to 11 cm (2.0 to 4.3 in) long and 2 to 4 cm (0.79 to 1.57 in) wide, with 15 to 20 pairs of inconspicuous and nearly parallel lateral veins which is a helpful diagnostic feature in the field. The apex of each leaf is short acuminate and the base is broadly cuneate, with entire and smooth margins. Its flowers are yellowish green, fragrant, in a terminal or axillary umbel. The fruit is a woody obovoid capsule with an outer covering of short grey hairs, 2.5 to 3 cm (0.98 to 1.18 in) long, opening in two flat valves when ripen. When the fruit is open, a silky thread from the base of the fruit holds the single seed (or two) in the air.

== Distribution ==
It is endemic to Southeast China including Hainan and found as an introduced species in Vietnam. It is threatened by habitat loss.

== Traditional uses ==
The tree produces agarwood, a valuable fragrant wood used for incense and medicine. Previously, the wood was used to make joss sticks and incense, but in Hong Kong this industry has died out.

The balm (resin) produced and accumulated from the wood is used as a valuable Chinese medicine called "Chen Xiang" (沉香). According to Chinese medicinal literature, the resin can be extracted in large quantities by natural fungal infection or by external wounding (up to 5 cm into the bark). Sustainable harvesting of the resin of one tree can be induced by opening a wound 3 to 4 cm into the bark, and with the resin collected a few years later after accumulation. Or a small quantity of resin can be extracted from wood blocks by heating or burning, so that the resin liquefies and seeps from the wood blocks. Sections of trees trunks or branches that contain patches of fragrant, resinous wood enter into the trade under the name "agarwood". The resin is probably produced by the plant as a reaction against fungal infection or external wounding. Resin impregnated fragrant wood is usually found in trees older than 20 years. Although not all trees are infected, with increasing harvest pressure, harvesters in some regions often fell trees indiscriminately in search of infected wood. Good quality "Chen Xiang", derived mostly from a related species Aquilaria malaccensis, was formerly imported from the Asian tropics into China but the supply of such quality products is now depleted. The resin produced by Aquilaria sinensis has been used as a substitute to the former and thus also under threats.

Aquilaria sinensis is a traditional medicine of the Yi people. The extract of the leaves has a laxative effect and the chemical constituent that causes it is genkwanin 5-O-beta-primeveroside. The extract has shown activity against pain and inflammation in mice.

== Gallery ==
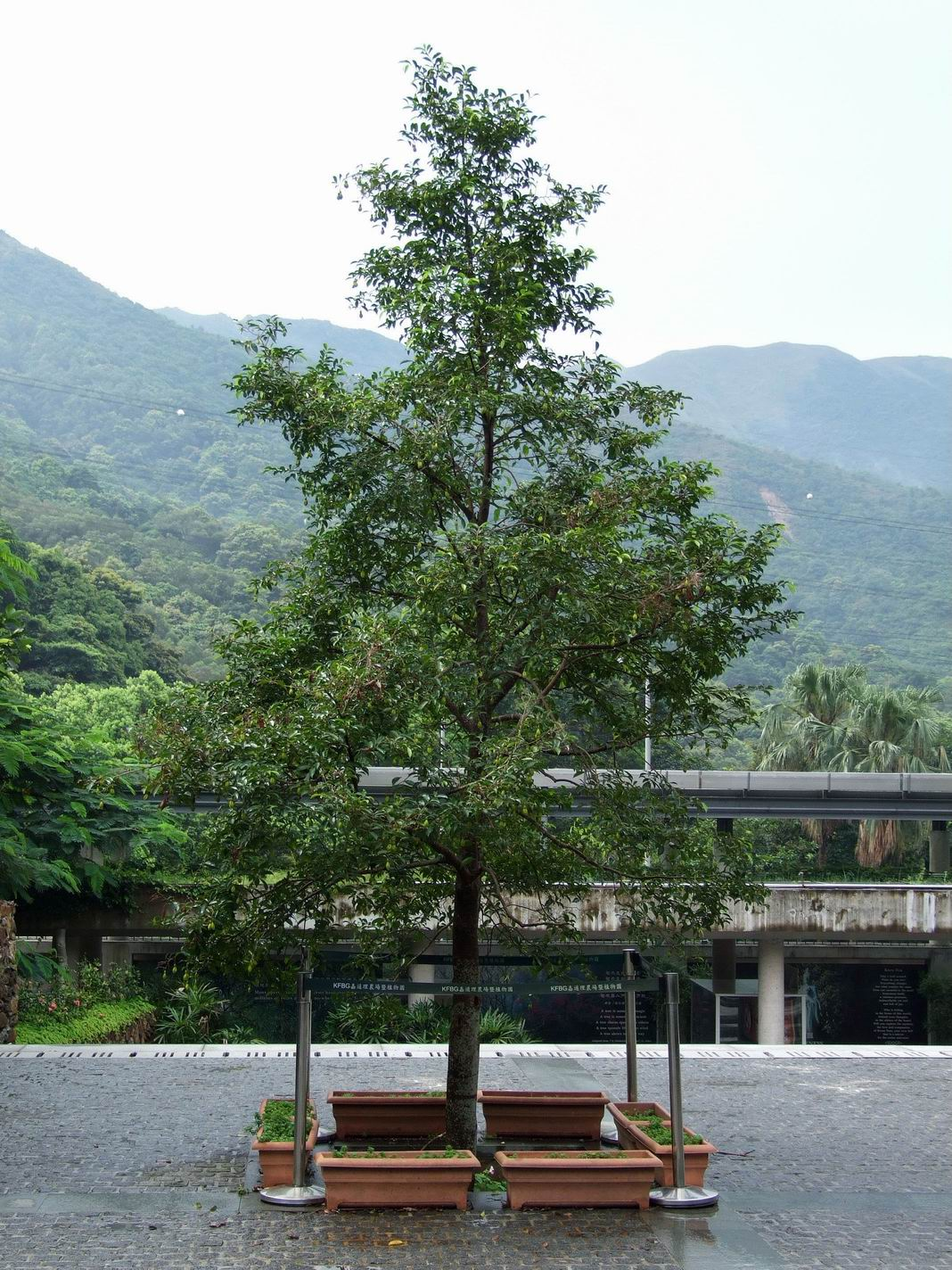
Habitus

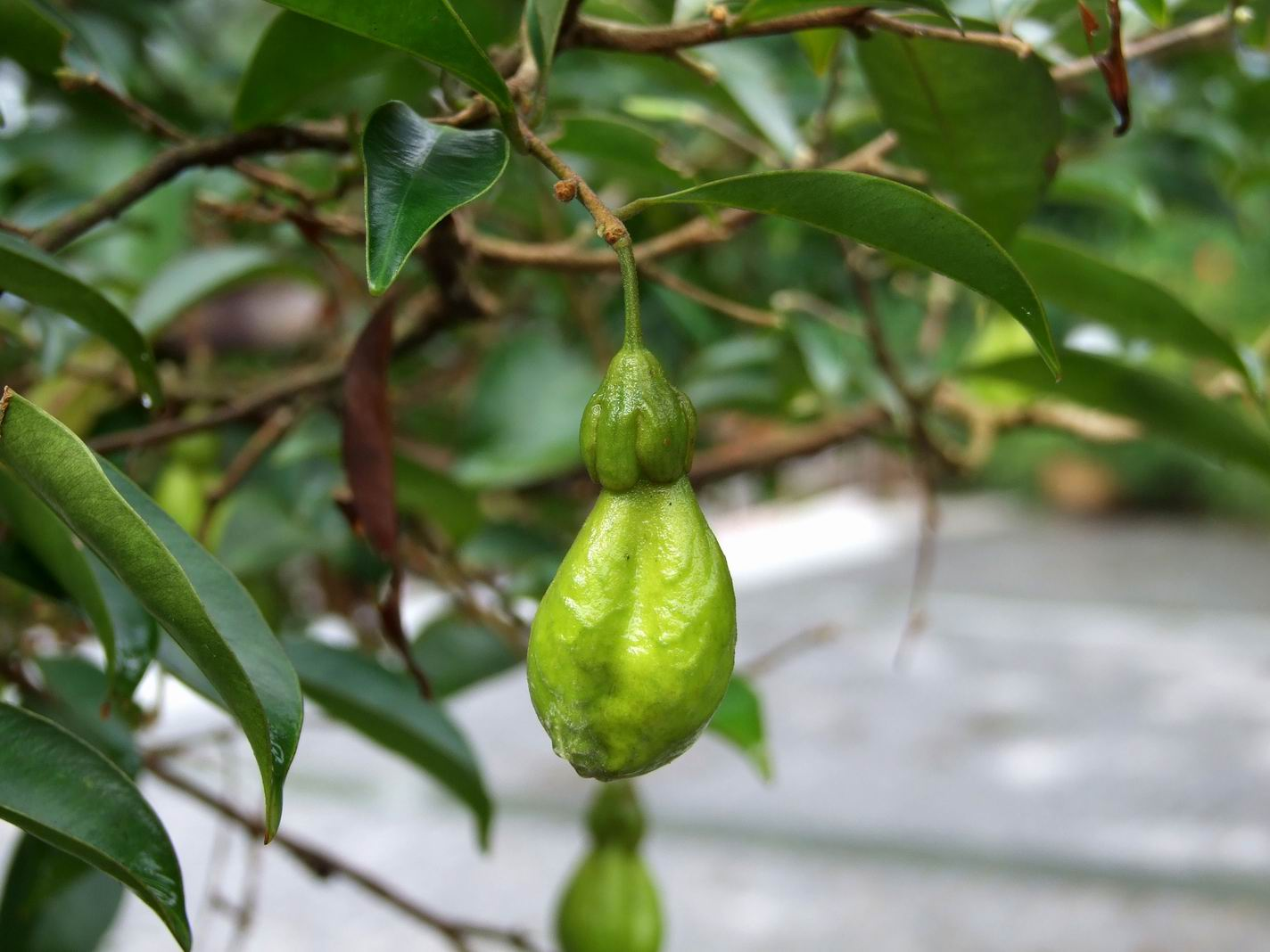
Fruit

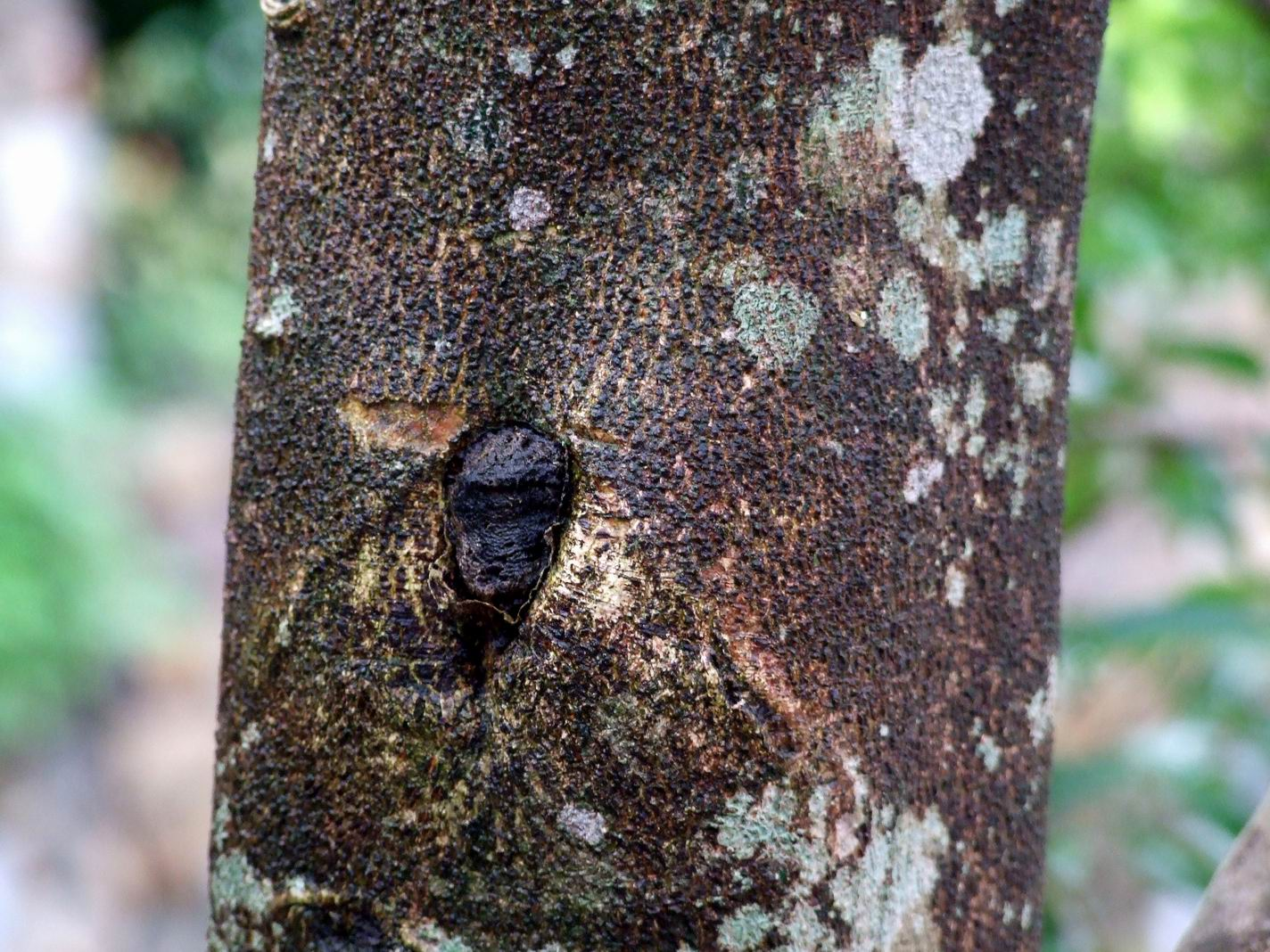
Bark
