= Aquilaria filaria =

Conservation status
- Vulnerable (IUCN 3.1)

Scientific classification
- Kingdom: Plantae
- Clade: Tracheophytes
- Clade: Angiosperms
- Clade: Eudicots
- Clade: Rosids
- Order: Malvales
- Family: Thymelaeaceae
- Genus: Aquilaria
- Species: A. filaria

Binomial name
- Aquilaria filaria (Oken) Merr.

Synonyms
- Aquilaria acuminata (Merr.) Quisumb.; Aquilaria tomentosa Gilg; Gyrinopsis acuminata Merr.; Pittosporum filarium Oken

Species of plant

Aquilaria filaria, the palisan, is a species of flowering plant in the family Thymelaeaceae. It is native to the eastern Philippines, the Maluku Islands, and Western New Guinea. A tree reaching 17 m (56 ft), it is a source of agarwood.
