= Aquilaria rostrata =

Conservation status
- Critically Endangered (IUCN 3.1)

Scientific classification
- Kingdom: Plantae
- Clade: Tracheophytes
- Clade: Angiosperms
- Clade: Eudicots
- Clade: Rosids
- Order: Malvales
- Family: Thymelaeaceae
- Genus: Aquilaria
- Species: A. rostrata

Binomial name
- Aquilaria rostrata Ridley

Species of agarwood tree from Peninsular Malaysia

Aquilaria rostrata is a species of tree in the family Thymelaeaceae. It is endemic to Peninsular Malaysia. It is sometimes used for agarwood, but unsustainable harvesting is believed to be threatening agarwood-producing species and therefore is discouraged by environmental groups.
