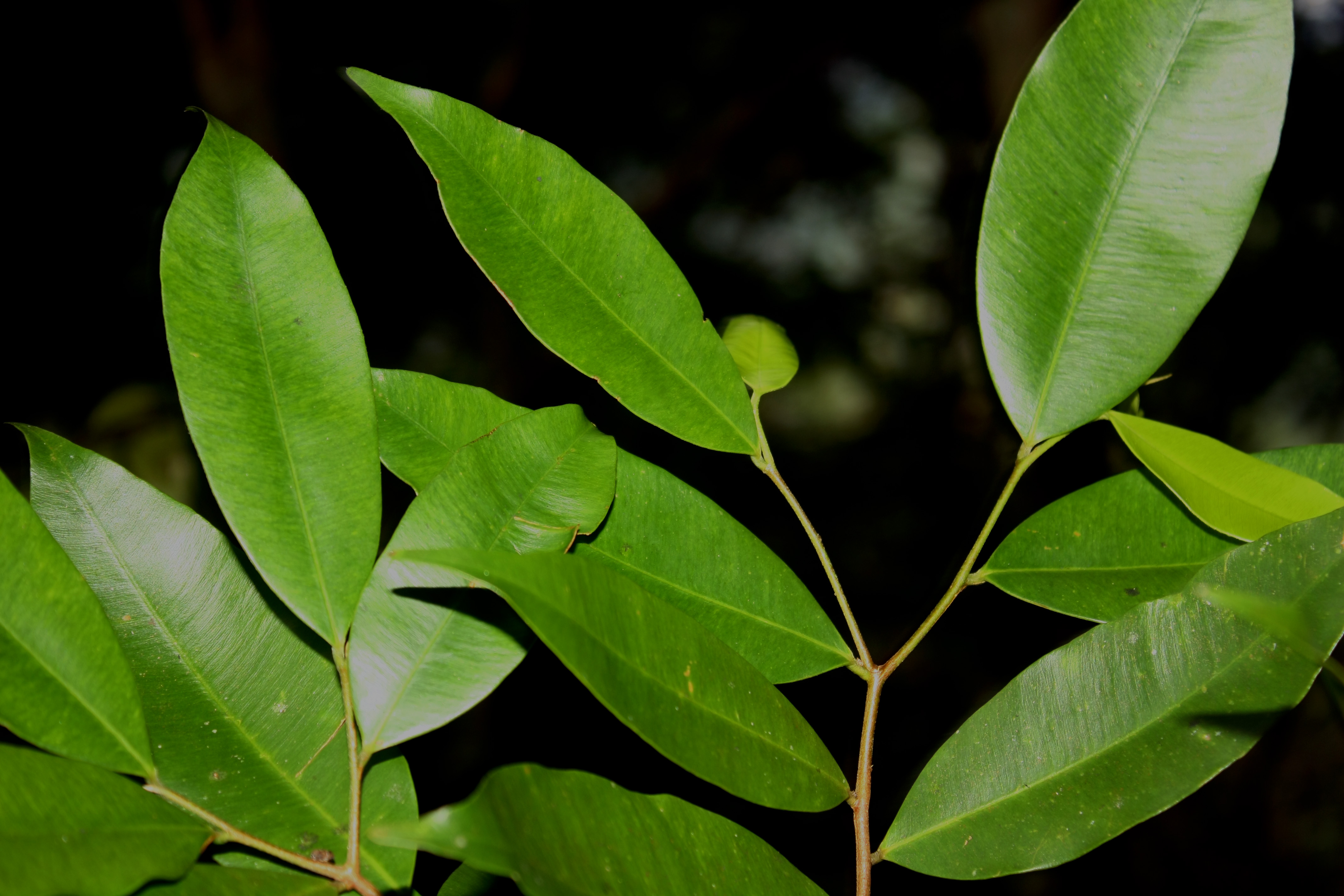
- Leaves of Gyrinops walla

Scientific classification
- Kingdom: Plantae
- Clade: Tracheophytes
- Clade: Angiosperms
- Clade: Eudicots
- Clade: Rosids
- Order: Malvales
- Family: Thymelaeaceae
- Subfamily: Thymelaeoideae
- Genus: Gyrinops; Gaertn. (1791)

Species
- 9; see text

Synonyms
- Brachythalamus Gilg (1899); Lachnolepis Miq. (1863)

= Gyrinops =

Genus of flowering plants

Gyrinops is a genus of nine species of trees, called lign aloes or lign-aloes trees, in the family Thymelaeaceae. They are native to Southeast Asia, the Indian subcontinent, and New Guinea.

The genus Gyrinops is closely related to Aquilaria and in the past all species were considered to belong to Aquilaria.

== Agarwood production ==
Together with Aquilaria the genus is best known as the principal producer of the resin-suffused agarwood. The depletion of wild trees from indiscriminate cutting for agarwood has resulted in the trees being listed and protected as an endangered species.

Projects are currently underway in some countries in southeast Asia to infect cultivated trees artificially to produce agarwood in a sustainable manner. In Indonesia, for example, there have been proposals to encourage the planting of gahara, as it is known as locally, in eastern Indonesia, particularly in the province of Papua.

== Species ==
Nine species are accepted.

- Gyrinops caudata (Gilg) Domke
- Gyrinops decipiens Ding Hou
- Gyrinops ledermanii Domke
- Gyrinops moluccana (Miq.) Baill.
- Gyrinops podocarpa (Gilg) Domke
- Gyrinops salicifolia Ridl.
- Gyrinops versteegii (Gilg) Domke
- Gyrinops vidalii P.H.Hô
- Gyrinops walla Gaertn.
