= Sancy (disambiguation) =

Sancy may refer to:

- The Sancy, a pale yellow diamond of 55.23 carats (11.046 g) that has been owned by a number of important figures in European history, such as Charles the Bold, James VI and I, and the Astor family.

Sancy is the name or part of the name of several communes in France:

- Sancy, Meurthe-et-Moselle, in the Meurthe-et-Moselle département
- Sancy, Seine-et-Marne, in the Seine-et-Marne department
- Sancy-les-Cheminots, in the Aisne département
- Sancy-lès-Provins, in the Seine-et-Marne département

== See also ==
- Puy de Sancy, the highest mountain in central France
- Sansi (disambiguation)
