= Aquilaria hirta =

Conservation status
- Vulnerable (IUCN 3.1)

Scientific classification
- Kingdom: Plantae
- Clade: Tracheophytes
- Clade: Angiosperms
- Clade: Eudicots
- Clade: Rosids
- Order: Malvales
- Family: Thymelaeaceae
- Genus: Aquilaria
- Species: A. hirta

Binomial name
- Aquilaria hirta Ridl.

Species of agarwood tree from Southeast Asia

Aquilaria hirta is a species of plant in the Thymelaeaceae family. It is found in Malaysia and Indonesia. Aquilaria hirta are suited for carving and hard like stone, but the species of Aquilaria hirta are not used very often in perfume and incense due to rarity.
