= Aquilaria microcarpa =

Conservation status
- Endangered (IUCN 3.1)

Scientific classification
- Kingdom: Plantae
- Clade: Tracheophytes
- Clade: Angiosperms
- Clade: Eudicots
- Clade: Rosids
- Order: Malvales
- Family: Thymelaeaceae
- Genus: Aquilaria
- Species: A. microcarpa

Binomial name
- Aquilaria microcarpa Baill.

Species of agarwood plant from Southeast Asia

Aquilaria microcarpa is a species of plant in the Thymelaeaceae family. It is found in Indonesia and Singapore.
