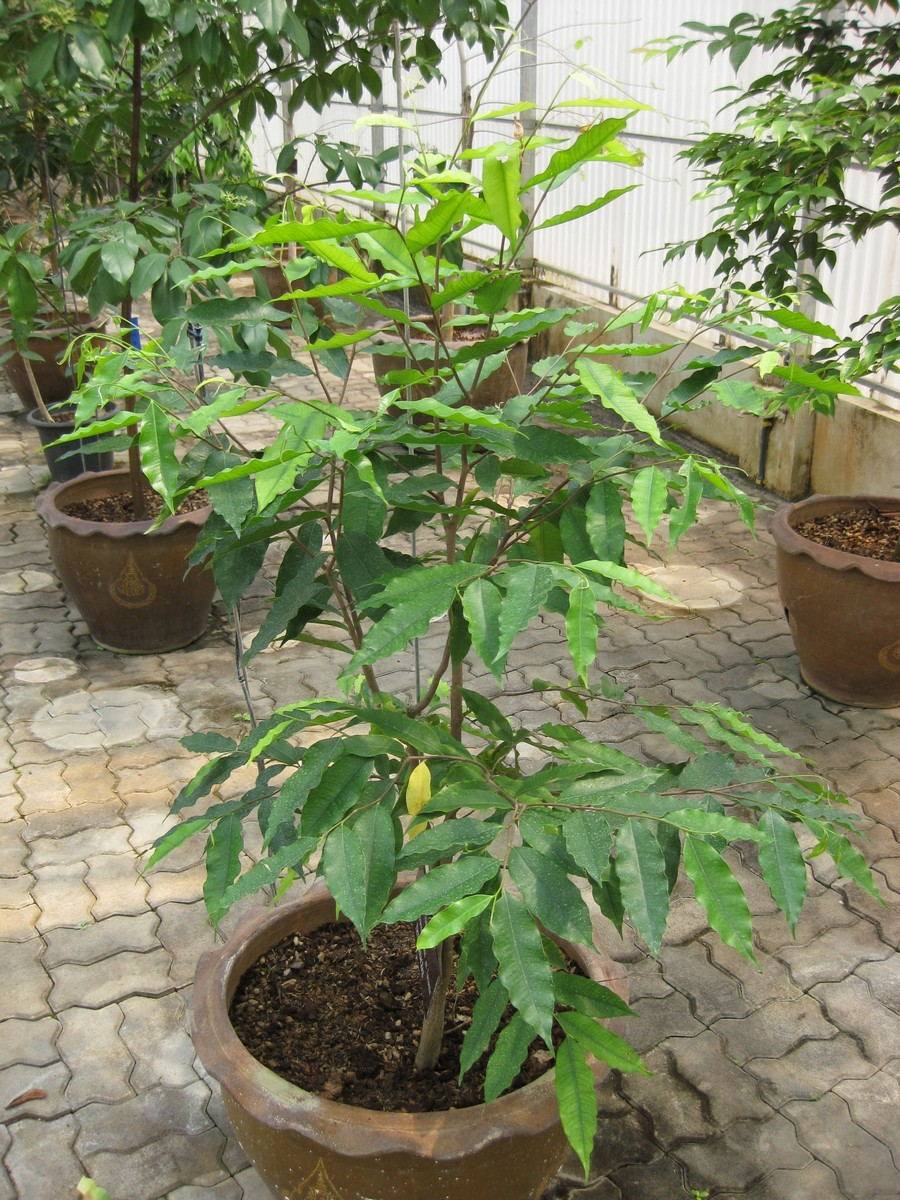

Conservation status
- Critically Endangered (IUCN 3.1)

Scientific classification
- Kingdom: Plantae
- Clade: Tracheophytes
- Clade: Angiosperms
- Clade: Eudicots
- Clade: Rosids
- Order: Malvales
- Family: Thymelaeaceae
- Genus: Aquilaria
- Species: A. crassna

Binomial name
- Aquilaria crassna Pierre

= Aquilaria crassna =

Species of agarwood tree from Southeast Asia

Aquilaria crassna is a species of plant in the Thymelaeaceae family. It is critically endangered and native to Southeast Asia.

== Economics ==
Aquilaria crassna is one source of agarwood, a resinous heartwood, used for perfume and incense. The resin is produced by the tree in response to infection by a parasitic ascomycetous mold, Phaeoacremonium parasitica, a dematiaceous (dark-walled) fungus.
