= Nanhe, Xingtai =

Nanhe 南和区 Nanho
- District
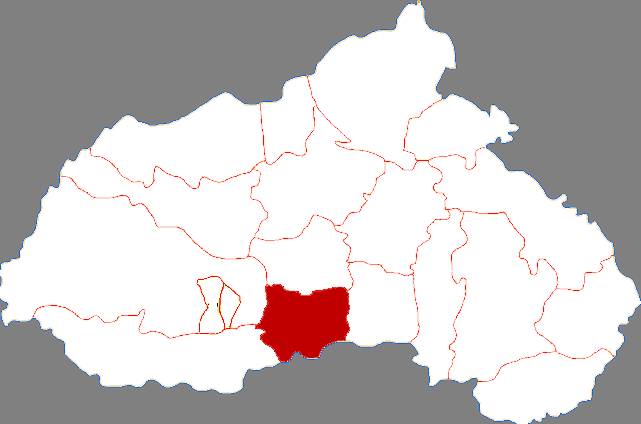
- Nanhe District in Xingtai

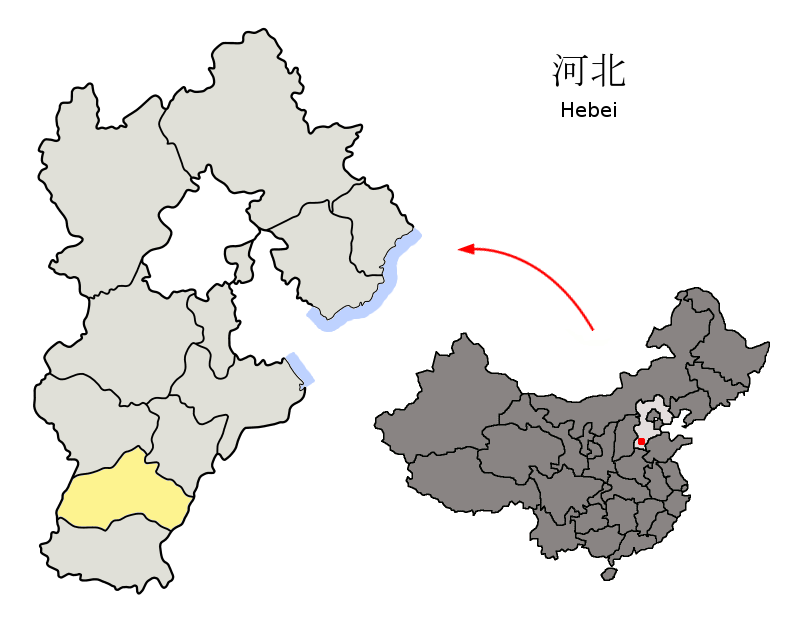
- Xingtai in Hebei

- Location in Hebei
- Coordinates: 36°58′N 114°41′E
- Country: China
- Province: Hebei
- Prefecture-level city: Xingtai
- District seat: Heyang

Area
  - Total: 404.8 km^{2} (156.3 sq mi)

Population (2020 census)
  - Total: 350,384
  - Density: 865.6/km^{2} (2,242/sq mi)
- Time zone: UTC+8 (China Standard)
- Website: www.nanhe.gov.cn

Nanhe District (simplified Chinese: 南和区; traditional Chinese: 南和區; pinyin: Nánhé Qū) is a district in the south of Hebei province, China. It is under the administration of Xingtai City.

== Administrative divisions ==
Nanhe District is divided into 3 towns and 5 townships.

3 towns are: Heyang (和阳镇), Jiasong (贾宋镇), Haoqiao (郝桥镇).

5 townships are: Dongsanzhao Township (东三召乡), Yanli Township (阎里乡), Heguo Township (河郭乡), Shizhao Township (史召乡), Sansi Township (三思乡).

== Climate ==
Climate data for Nanhe, elevation 43 m (141 ft), (1991–2020 normals, extremes 1981–present)
Month	Jan	Feb	Mar	Apr	May	Jun	Jul	Aug	Sep	Oct	Nov	Dec	Year
Record high °C (°F)	18.8 (65.8)	25.9 (78.6)	31.5 (88.7)	34.0 (93.2)	38.8 (101.8)	42.5 (108.5)	41.0 (105.8)	37.1 (98.8)	38.5 (101.3)	33.2 (91.8)	27.5 (81.5)	25.6 (78.1)	42.5 (108.5)
Mean daily maximum °C (°F)	3.7 (38.7)	8.2 (46.8)	15.0 (59.0)	21.5 (70.7)	27.3 (81.1)	32.5 (90.5)	32.4 (90.3)	30.6 (87.1)	27.0 (80.6)	21.2 (70.2)	12.1 (53.8)	5.3 (41.5)	19.7 (67.5)
Daily mean °C (°F)	−2.2 (28.0)	1.7 (35.1)	8.4 (47.1)	15.1 (59.2)	21.0 (69.8)	26.1 (79.0)	27.3 (81.1)	25.5 (77.9)	20.9 (69.6)	14.7 (58.5)	6.0 (42.8)	−0.4 (31.3)	13.7 (56.6)
Mean daily minimum °C (°F)	−7.0 (19.4)	−3.6 (25.5)	2.5 (36.5)	9.0 (48.2)	14.8 (58.6)	20.2 (68.4)	23.0 (73.4)	21.4 (70.5)	15.9 (60.6)	9.2 (48.6)	1.0 (33.8)	−4.9 (23.2)	8.5 (47.2)
Record low °C (°F)	−21.9 (−7.4)	−19.5 (−3.1)	−11.3 (11.7)	−2.2 (28.0)	3.4 (38.1)	9.2 (48.6)	15.9 (60.6)	12.7 (54.9)	5.4 (41.7)	−2.1 (28.2)	−15.0 (5.0)	−19.1 (−2.4)	−21.9 (−7.4)
Average precipitation mm (inches)	2.3 (0.09)	6.6 (0.26)	7.9 (0.31)	24.8 (0.98)	40.8 (1.61)	59.1 (2.33)	142.2 (5.60)	114.5 (4.51)	47.5 (1.87)	26.0 (1.02)	14.4 (0.57)	2.7 (0.11)	488.8 (19.26)
Average precipitation days (≥ 0.1 mm)	1.6	3.0	2.7	5.1	6.6	8.1	10.8	9.3	7.0	5.2	3.6	1.7	64.7
Average snowy days	2.5	2.7	0.9	0.2	0	0	0	0	0	0	1.2	2.5	10
Average relative humidity (%)	61	57	54	61	63	61	76	81	75	68	70	66	66
Mean monthly sunshine hours	134.9	147.7	195.4	217.3	241.2	217.5	176.7	185.8	175.5	172.7	140.5	132.6	2,137.8
Percentage possible sunshine	44	48	52	55	55	50	40	45	48	50	47	45	48
Source: China Meteorological Administration
