= Aquilaria beccariana =

Conservation status
- Vulnerable (IUCN 3.1)

Scientific classification
- Kingdom: Plantae
- Clade: Tracheophytes
- Clade: Angiosperms
- Clade: Eudicots
- Clade: Rosids
- Order: Malvales
- Family: Thymelaeaceae
- Genus: Aquilaria
- Species: A. beccariana

Binomial name
- Aquilaria beccariana van Tiegh.

Species of agarwood tree from Southeast Asia

Aquilaria beccariana is a species of plant in the Thymelaeaceae family. It is found in Indonesia and Malaysia. It is threatened by habitat loss.
