= Aquilaria banaensae =

Conservation status
- Vulnerable (IUCN 2.3)

Scientific classification
- Kingdom: Plantae
- Clade: Tracheophytes
- Clade: Angiosperms
- Clade: Eudicots
- Clade: Rosids
- Order: Malvales
- Family: Thymelaeaceae
- Genus: Aquilaria
- Species: A. banaensae

Binomial name
- Aquilaria banaensae Phamh.

Species of agarwood tree from Vietnam

Aquilaria banaensae is a species of plant in the Thymelaeaceae family. It is endemic to Vietnam.
