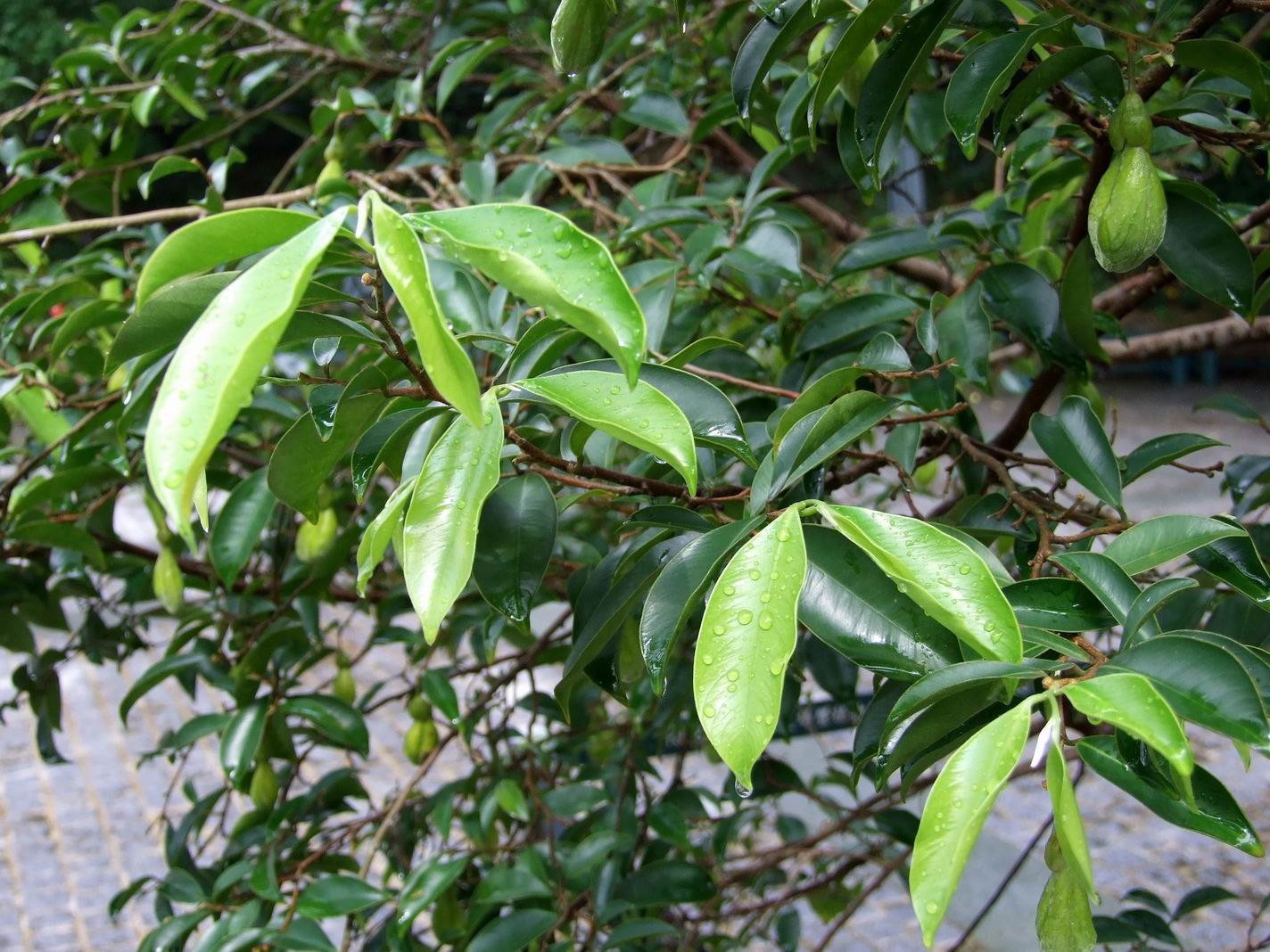
- Aquilaria sinensis leaves

Conservation status
- CITES Appendix II

Scientific classification
- Kingdom: Plantae
- Clade: Embryophytes
- Clade: Tracheophytes
- Clade: Spermatophytes
- Clade: Angiosperms
- Clade: Eudicots
- Clade: Rosids
- Order: Malvales
- Family: Thymelaeaceae
- Subfamily: Thymelaeoideae
- Genus: Aquilaria; Lam. (1788)

Species
- 21; see text

Synonyms
- Agallochum Lam. (1783); Aloexylum Lour. (1790); Aquilariella Tiegh. (1893); Decaisnella Kuntze (1891), nom. illeg.; Gyrinopsis Decne. (1843); Ophispermum Lour. (1790)

= Aquilaria =

Genus of flowering plants

Aquilaria is a genus of trees, called lign aloes or lign-aloes trees, in the family Thymelaeaceae. It includes 21 species native to southeast Asia. They occur particularly in the rainforests of Indonesia, Thailand, Cambodia, Laos, Vietnam, southern China, Malaysia, Northeast India, Bangladesh, the Philippines, Borneo and New Guinea. The trees grow to 6–20 m (20–66 ft) tall. The leaves are alternate, 5–11 cm (2.0–4.3 in) long and 2–4 cm (0.79–1.6 in) broad, with a short acuminate apex and an entire margin. The flowers are yellowish-green, produced in an umbel; the fruit is a woody capsule 2.5–3 cm (0.98–1.2 in) long.

The genus is best known, together with Gyrinops, as the principal producer of the resin-suffused agarwood used in aromatic incense production, especially Aquilaria malaccensis. The depletion of wild trees from indiscriminate cutting for agarwood has resulted in the trees being listed and protected as an endangered species. Projects are currently underway in some countries in southeast Asia to infect cultivated Aquilaria trees artificially to produce agarwood in a sustainable manner. In Indonesia, for example, there have been proposals to encourage the planting of gahara, as it is known locally, in eastern Indonesia, particularly in the province of Papua.

== Species ==
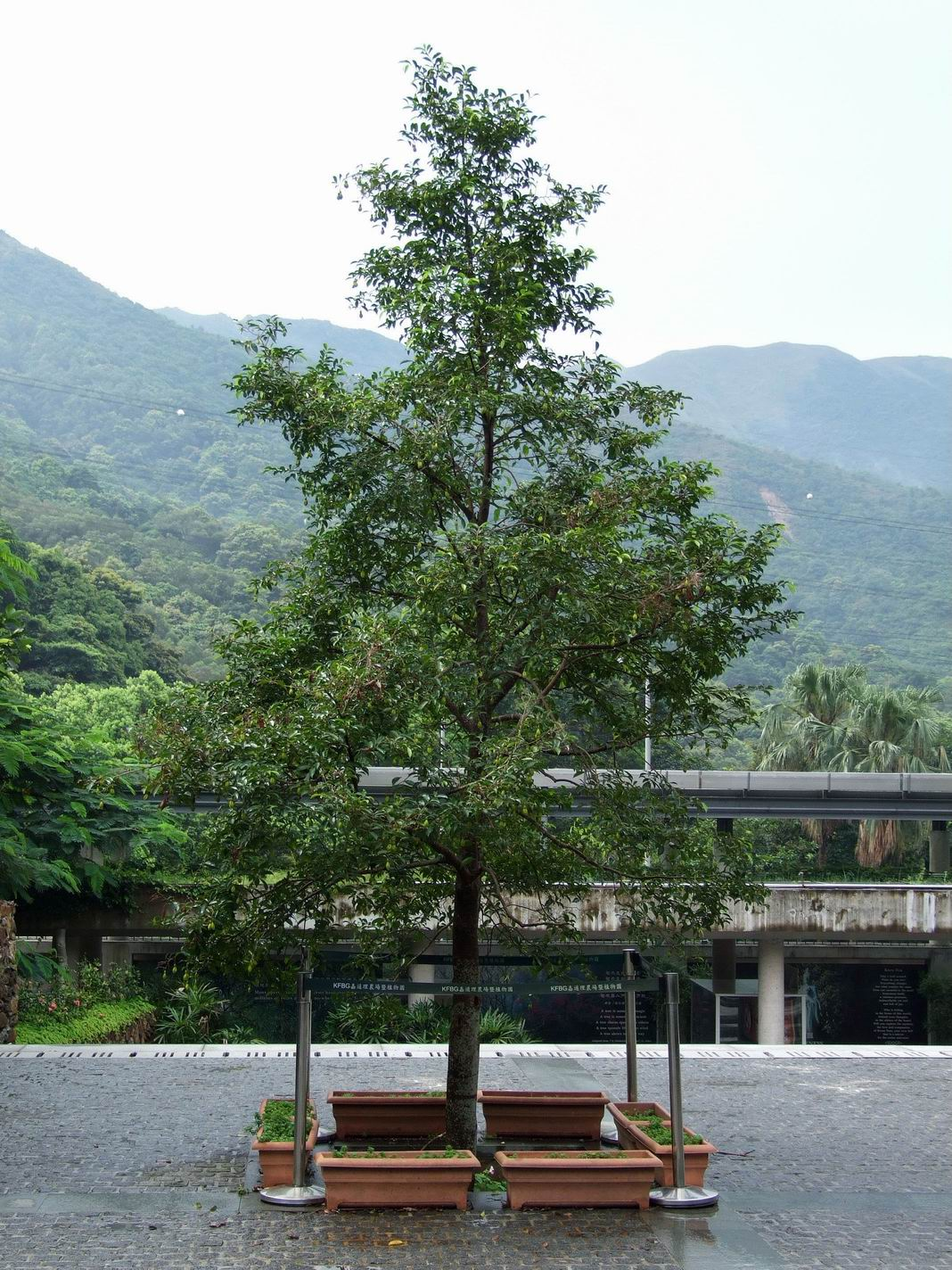
Aquilaria sinensis habitus

There are 21 species assigned to this genus:

- Aquilaria apiculata Merr.
- Aquilaria baillonii Pierre ex Lecomte & Leandri
- Aquilaria banaensae Phamh.
- Aquilaria beccariana Tiegh
- Aquilaria brachyantha (Merr.) Hallier f.
- Aquilaria citrinicarpa (Elmer) Hallier f.
- Aquilaria crassna Pierre ex Lecomte
- Aquilaria cumingiana (Decne.) Ridl.
- Aquilaria filaria (Oken) Merr.
- Aquilaria grandiflora Benth.
- Aquilaria hirta Ridl.
- Aquilaria khasiana Hallier f.
- Aquilaria malaccensis, Lam.
- Aquilaria microcarpa Baill.
- Aquilaria parvifolia (Quisumb.) Ding Hou
- Aquilaria rostrata Ridl.
- Aquilaria rugosa K.Le-Cong & Kessler
- Aquilaria sinensis Gilg
- Aquilaria subintegra Ding Hou
- Aquilaria urdanetensis (Elmer) Hallier f. – Philippines
- Aquilaria yunnanensis S.C.Huang
