= Sansi Township =

Township in Hebei, China

Sansi Township 三思乡
- Township
- Location in Hebei
- Coordinates: 36°57′8″N 114°41′9″E
- Country: People's Republic of China
- Province: Hebei
- Prefecture-level city: Xingtai
- District: Nanhe District
- Time zone: UTC+8 (China Standard)

Sansi Township (simplified Chinese: 三思乡; traditional Chinese: 三思鄉; pinyin: Sānsī Xiāng) is a township in Nanhe District, Xingtai, Hebei, China. As of 2020, it administers the following 13 villages:

- Dongbeibu Village (东北部村)
- Xisong Village (西宋村)
- Huaizhuang Village (淮庄村)
- Xida Village (西大村)
- Dongda Village (东大村)
- Lishou Village (里首村)
- Xinanbu Village (西南部村)
- Dongnanbu Village (东南部村)
- Xibeibu Village (西北部村)
- Qianguoping Village (前郭平村)
- Houguoping Village (后郭平村)
- Xin Village (辛村)
- Nanhan Village (南韩村)
