= Aquilaria cumingiana =

Conservation status
- Vulnerable (IUCN 3.1)

Scientific classification
- Kingdom: Plantae
- Clade: Tracheophytes
- Clade: Angiosperms
- Clade: Eudicots
- Clade: Rosids
- Order: Malvales
- Family: Thymelaeaceae
- Genus: Aquilaria
- Species: A. cumingiana

Binomial name
- Aquilaria cumingiana (Decne.) Ridl.

Synonyms
- Decaisnella cumingiana (Decne.) Kuntze; Gyrinopsis cumingiana Decne. Aquilaria pubescens (Elmer) Hallier f. Gyrinopsis cumingiana var. pubescens Elmer; Gyrinopsis pubifolia Quisumb.

Species of agarwood tree from Southeast Asia

Aquilaria cumingiana is a species of plant in the Thymelaeaceae family. It is found in Indonesia and the Philippines.
