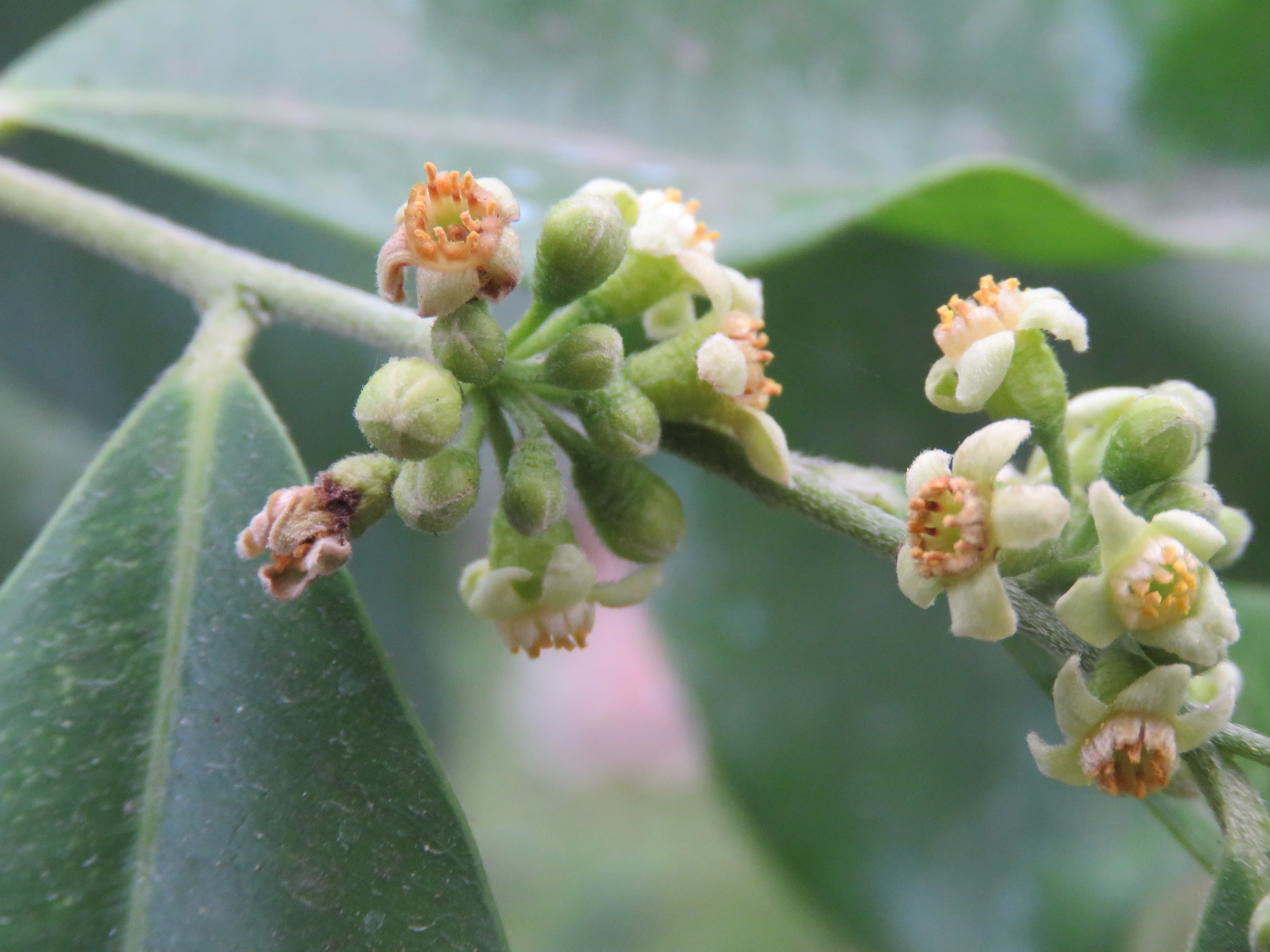
- Aquilaria malaccensis at Munnar

Conservation status
- Critically Endangered (IUCN 3.1)

Scientific classification
- Kingdom: Plantae
- Clade: Tracheophytes
- Clade: Angiosperms
- Clade: Eudicots
- Clade: Rosids
- Order: Malvales
- Family: Thymelaeaceae
- Genus: Aquilaria
- Species: A. malaccensis

Binomial name
- Aquilaria malaccensis Lam.

Synonyms
- A. agallocha A. secundaria, A. malaccense A. ovata Agalochum malaccense

= Aquilaria malaccensis =

Species of agarwood tree from Asia

Aquilaria malaccensis (Hindi: अगर, agaru; Assamese: সাঁচিগছ, sānci; Arabic: عود هندي, transl. Indian oud) or agar is a species of lign-aloe tree in the family Thymelaeaceae. It is found in Bangladesh, Bhutan, India, Indonesia, Laos, Malaysia, Myanmar, the Philippines, Singapore,Thailand,also Cambodia. It is threatened by habitat loss.

The World List of Threatened Trees (Oldfield et al., 1998) listed Iran as one of the countries with a population of A. malaccensis. The exploratory 2002 CITES review confirmed that Iran has no record of the species. As a result, Iran is no longer considered as habitat for or producer of agarwood.

== Uses ==
=== Agarwood ===
Aquilaria malaccensis is the major source of agarwood, a resinous heartwood, used for perfume and incense. The resin is produced by the tree in response to infection by a parasitic ascomycetous mould, Phaeoacremonium parasitica, a dematiaceous (dark-walled) fungus. Agarwood is widely used in perfume industry, especially amongst Arabic brands. However, some European brands also claim to use natural agarwood oil in almost every perfume (for example: Montale and its perfume Wild Aoud).

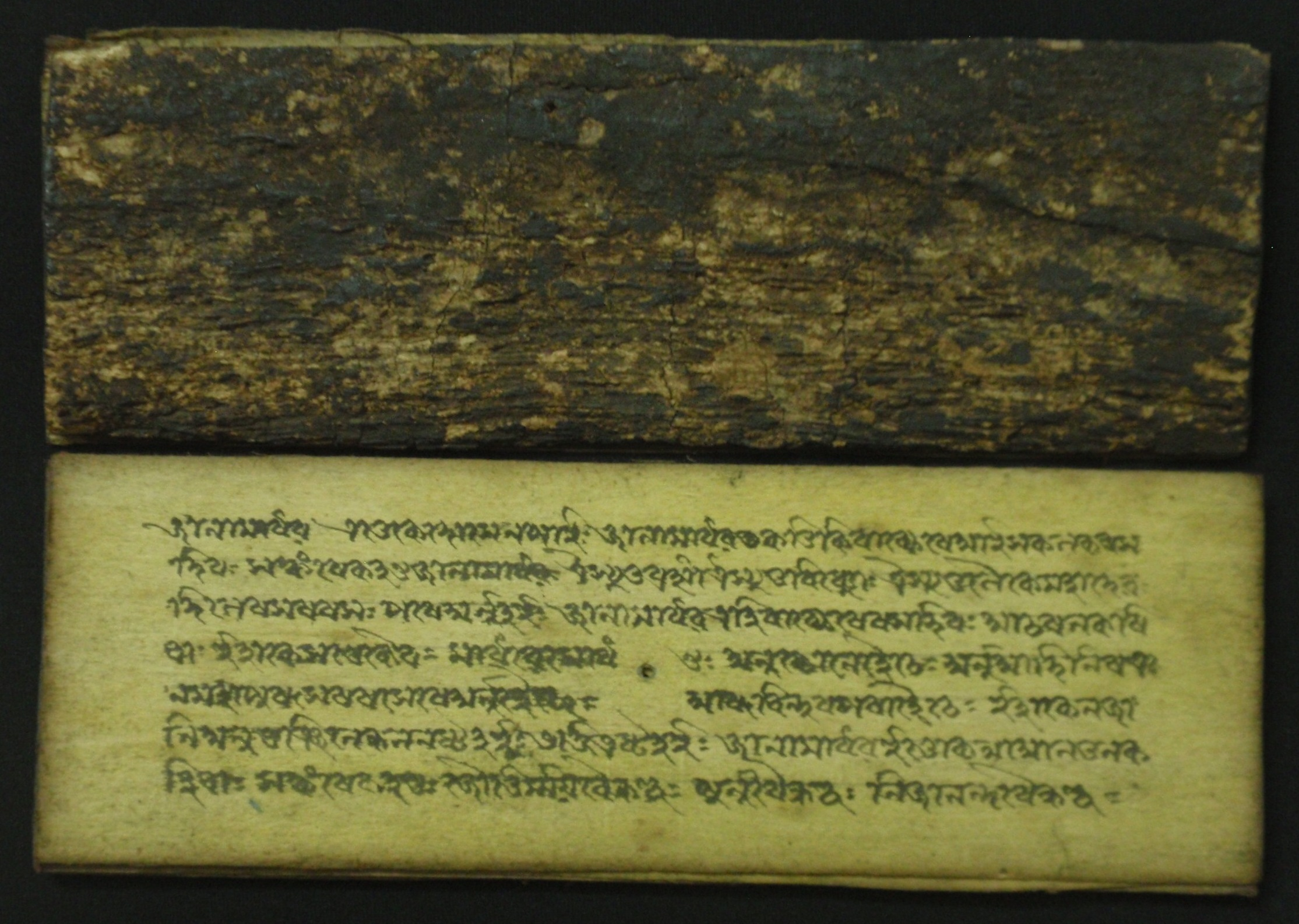
Sanchipat manuscript, made from the bark of Aquilaria malaccensis

=== Sanchipat ===
The bark of Aquilaria malaccensis is used in the traditional Assamese manuscript, the sanchipat. It is a strung manuscript similar in construction to a palm-leaf manuscript. The bark of Aquilaria malaccensis is degummed and treated with toxic minerals to make it anti-fungal and pest resistant, helping it last in Assam's humid tropical environment.

== Threats ==
Due to rising demand for agarwood, as well as shortcomings in monitoring harvests and an increasing illegal trade, A. malaccensis is on the brink of extinction in the wild and is now considered critically endangered on the IUCN Red List. Due to large-scale logging operations, many forested areas where A. malaccensis was once abundant have been destroyed.

=== Conservation ===
Despite its endangerment, Aquilaria malaccensis is highly adaptable and can also perform well in areas contaminated by pollution. Due to this, conservation plans have been set in place to raise agarwood in contaminated areas as well as homestead gardens. India is promoting the sustainable cultivation of Aquilaria malaccensis to support the economic growth of the North eastern states.

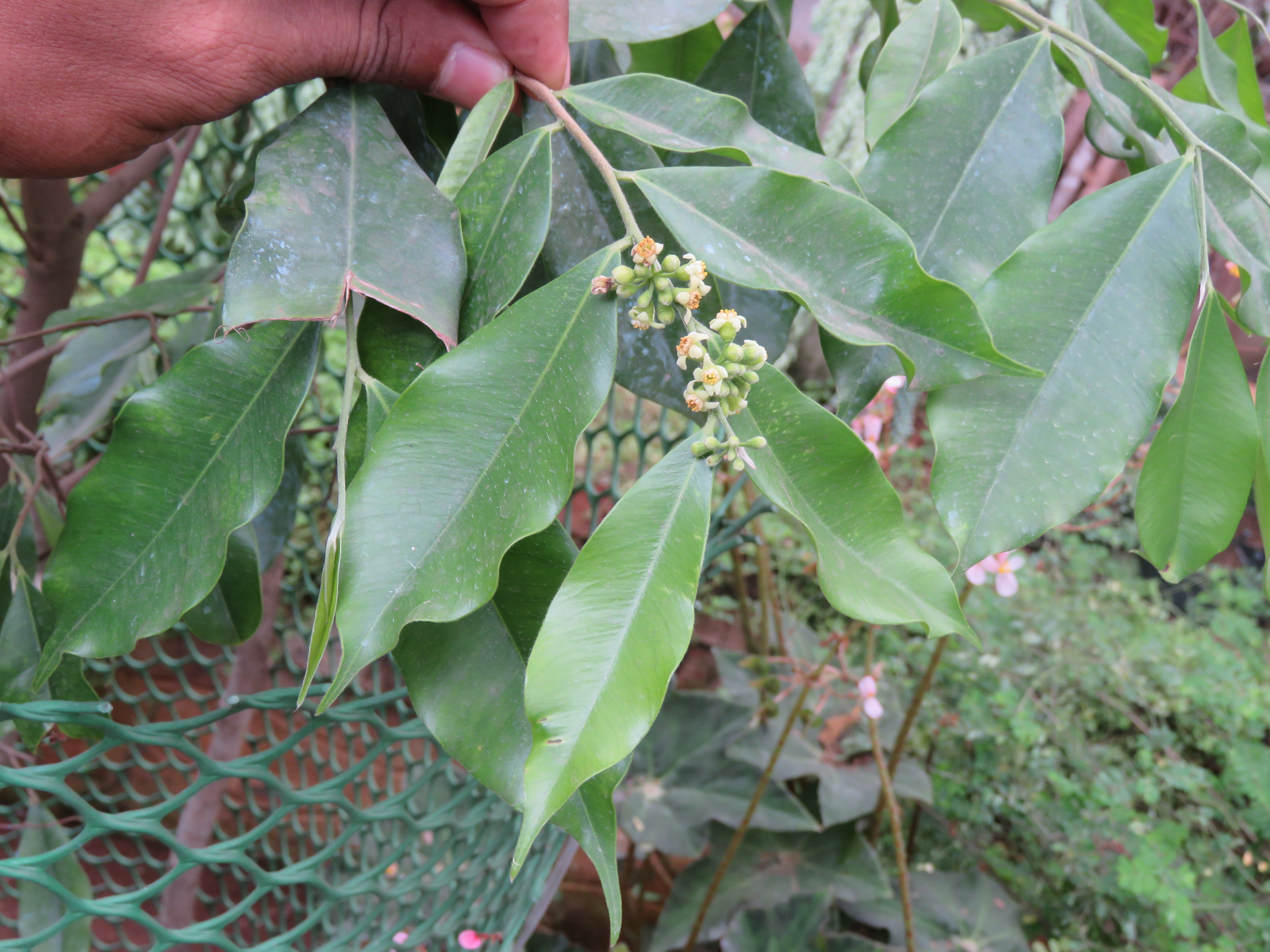
Aquilaria malaccensis – agar wood, eaglewood – Indian aloewood, Munnar

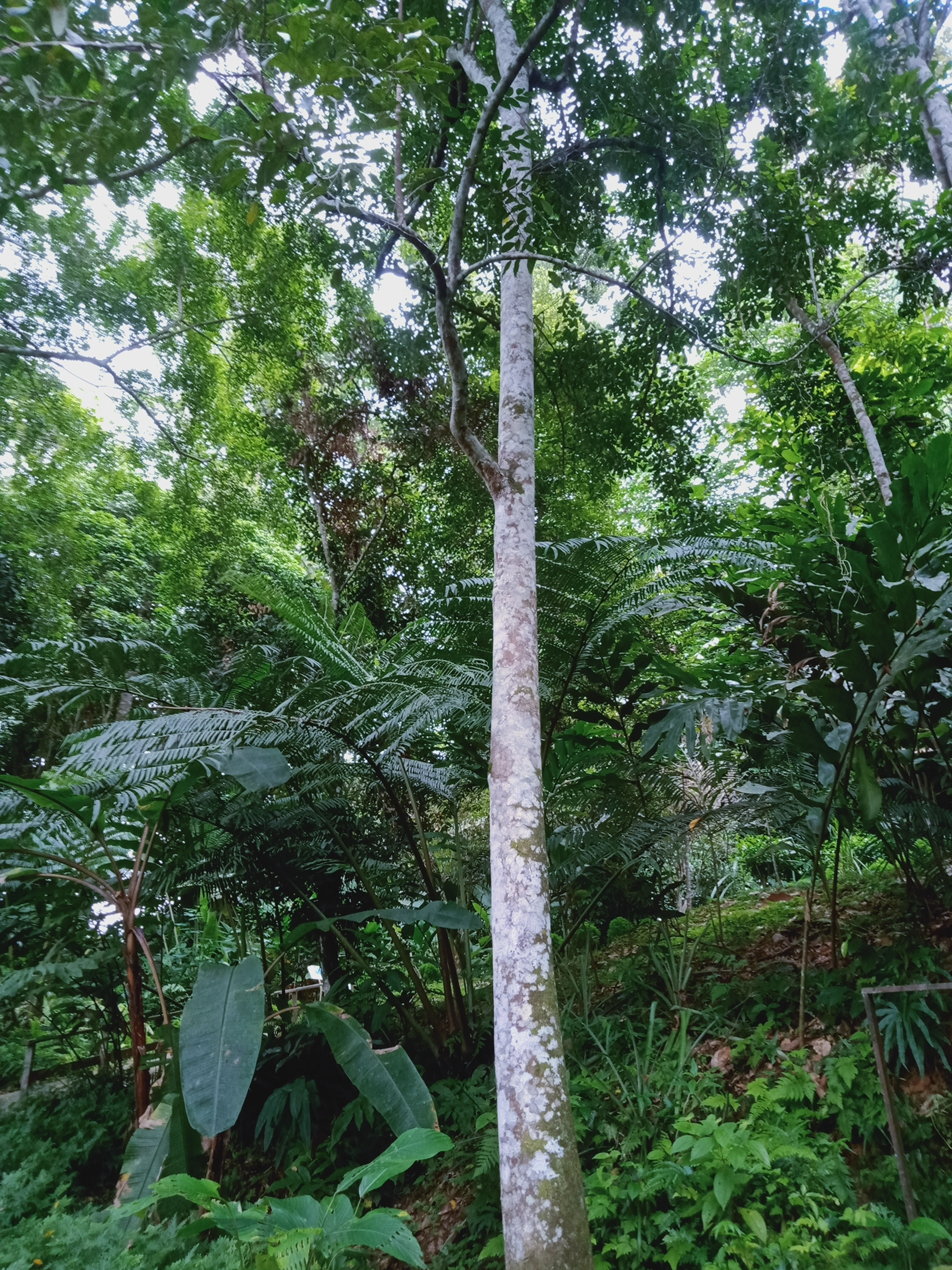
Aquilaria malaccensis
