= Sanzi =

Chinese artist (born 1965)

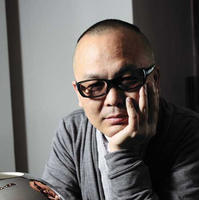
- Born: 22 April 1965 (age 61); Yangzhou, China
- Education: Institute of Fine Arts, Hunan Normal University
- Known for: Painting, drawing, sculpture
- Notable work: Summer Song to Lotus (2007), Autumn (2009)

Sanzi (Chinese: 散子; pinyin: Sǎnzǐ, born in 1965 in Yangzhou, Jiangsu) is a contemporary multimedia artist. He deploys a combination of techniques including Western painting, traditional Chinese ink painting, metal, wood and porcelain works.

He gained recognition in 2005 and is a well-known figure in contemporary Chinese art. He promoted the international recognition of Chinese Taoist culture in the form of painting. He resides in Suzhou.

== Early life ==
His father was from Yangzhou, Jiangsu and mother from Pingxiang, Jiangxi. He was an only child and shortly after his second birthday, his father died. His widowed mother, already 46 years old, raised him. In the middle of the Cultural Revolution, as an intellectual, she became jobless and had to move home repeatedly to make the ends meet.

As a child, he was quiet, serious and often wrapped up in his own world of thoughts. Observing the hardships imposed on his mother through frequent moving, he later adopted the tag name “Sanzi”.

Whilst living in the countryside of Hunan during his elementary and middle school years, a traditional Chinese artist was his neighbor. He developed a great affection for Xiaolong, he tutored and encouraged him to study art. This apprenticeship ended in the early 1980s, when his mother resumed full-time employment after the Cultural Revolution and took Xiaolong to Changsha City, Hunan.

== Education ==
In 1983, Sanzi enrolled in the Fine Arts Institute of Hunan Normal University in Changsha. There he studied traditional Chinese ink painting, calligraphy, as well as European oil painting and sculpture. After graduation, he was granted a post-graduate research scholarship and was also assigned to teach newly enrolled students. Soon after he was also gained entry to the Hunan Academy of Art.

During this period, he started experimenting with paint and design using multi-media and mixed-techniques, influenced by Conceptual Art and Post-Modernism. The subjects of this work included landscape, figures, and occasionally still life. He also designed clocks, which incorporated both wood carving and metalwork.

In 1997, he left the old city of Changsha to move to the booming metropolis of Shenzhen, in search of inspiration, as well as the opportunity to exhibit his work.

== Beginning his Career ==
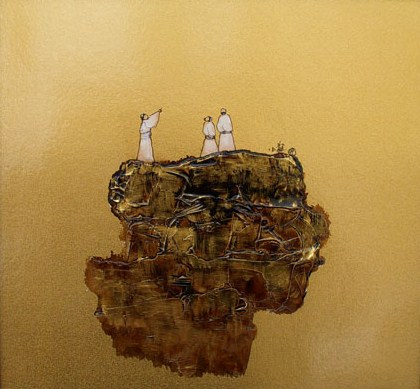
Wang Xiaolong, Queries to Heaven, 2006. Private Collection.

However upon arrival in Shenzhen, he found his attempts to exhibit his work frustrated; boom time Shenzhen society was engrossed in fast money and commerce, not art. In addition, his unconventional approach to art and design set him apart from traditional Chinese work and was not appreciated by the few local art dealers.

After repeated rejection and out of increasing desperation, he decided that his only choice was to promote his works himself. During the year 2000, Sanzi's works increasingly came to the attention of private European collectors who appreciated the uniqueness of his art. This brought him both recognition and the funding necessary for his later, larger-scale solo exhibitions and promotions.

=== Late 1990s to 2007 ===
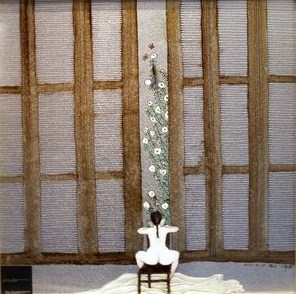
Wang Xiaolong, Middle Summer Bloom, 2006. Private Collection

During the late 1990s to 2007, the subjects of his paintings were increasingly centered around Taoism. In parallel, he created the first female figurative series, and named the series "Summer".

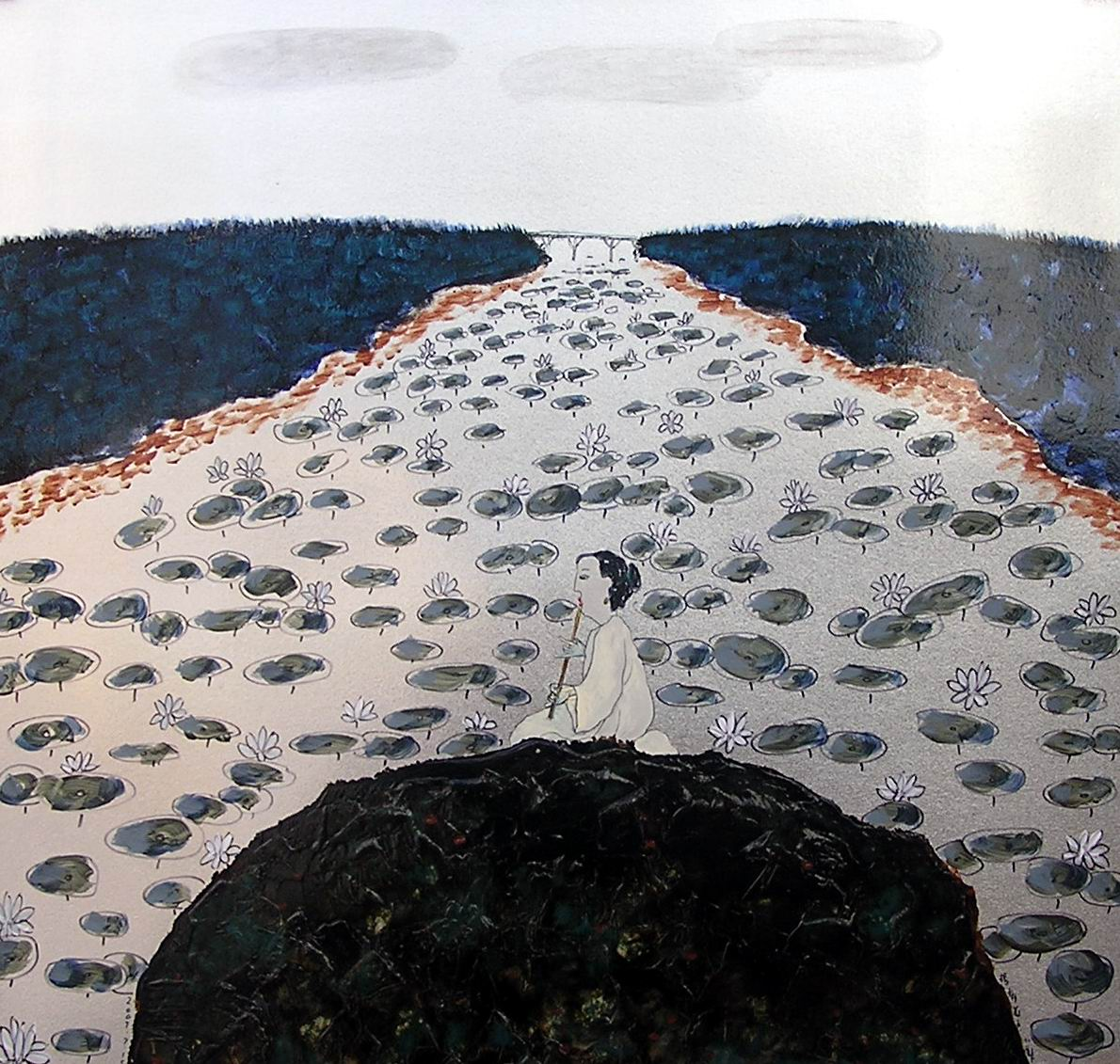
Wang Xiaolong, Summer Song to Lotus, 2006. Private Collection

The works in this period are often rendered in shades of pale grey, light gold, white and egg blue.

He also produced a series of conceptual landscapes later in this period, where the influence of surrealism and cubism can be clearly observed. These landscapes are appreciated as something of a rarity. He signed his works in this period with his full name, with either Chinese characters or Pinyin.

=== 2008 Sanzi Studio ===
In early 2008, a few pieces of his work were exhibited in Hong Kong with the assistance of a private curator, which introduced his works to the upper echelons of Hong Kong business. He was contracted to work with the interior design of high-profile architecture projects, including the Bank of China Hong Kong Office.

These projects occupied most of his time outside the studio, and the frequent traveling replayed his childhood.

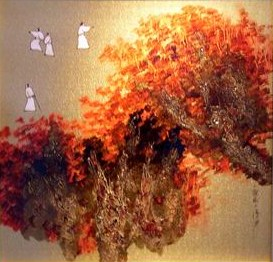
Wang Xiaolong, Queries in Fiery Autumn, 2008. Shanghai Art Museum

During this period, his works took on more intense colors such as fiery browns and bright oranges, although the iconic Taoism figures remained intact.

== Shanghai ==
In the middle of 2009, he moved to Shanghai continuing under the name “Sanzi Studio”. Sanzi Studio participated in the 13th Edition (2009) of the Shanghai Art Fair.

In November 2009, he had a solo Exhibition "Artishop • Sanzi • Charity" in Hong Kong, he was visited for the first time by the British auction house Bonhams. The proceedings of the exhibition were used to start the charity “Sanzi Funding” whose primary aim is to provide educational funding for impoverished children.

July 2010, he had another solo exhibition in Shanghai, sponsored by Hang Seng Bank, at Zendai Contemporary Art Exhibition Hall, part of the Zendai Group. In addition to works themed Taoism, he also introduced his latest progress in Abstract Art.

== Sanzi Art Gallery ==
Sanzi Art Gallery opened at Laguna Beach, Los Angeles.

Sanzi Art Gallery has set up in Shanghai and Beijing as well as in Singapore and Kuala Lumpur. There also have special cooperation institutions in New York and Miami in the United States. This is the first time to set up a special exhibition hall for the artworks of Sanzi in Laguna, Los Angeles.

== International fame ==
Sanzi has traveled to Hong Kong, New York, Paris, and many other artistic cities and now settles down in Shanghai. He has held large-scale personal work exhibitions in Hong Kong, Shanghai, Miami, New York, Taipei, Singapore, Kuala Lumpur, etc., and several well-known mainstream media made special reports and interviews on Mr. Sanzi and his personal exhibitions. His exclusive artwork is currently represented by the famous galleries－Art WeMe Contemporary Gallery in California, Malaysia & Singapore. With his rising popularity, he was ordered to create one background painting for China Pavilion during the Shanghai Expo in 2010.

Selected Solo Exhibitions

Solo Exhibition, Hong Kong, 2009

Solo Exhibition, Shanghai, 2009 - 2010

Basel Art Exhibition, 2011

Solo Exhibition in New York, 2012

Art Revolution Taipei, 2013

Asia Contemporary Art Show, Hong Kong, 2013

Art Expo Malaysia, 2013

Art Revolution Taipei, 2014

Solo Exhibition, Art Busan, 2014

Art Expo Malaysia, 2014

Solo Exhibition, Art Stage Singapore, 2015

Art Expo Malaysia 2015

Singapore Contemporary Art Show, 2016

SANZI ART GALLERY, Los Angeles, 2019

== Auctions ==
Auctioned for the first time by the renowned London Auction House, Bonhams in the United Kingdom, 2011

Spring Auction by the renowned Beijing Poly International Auction in Beijing, China, 2013

Fall Auctioned by China Guardian Auction, China, 2013

== Museum Collections ==
荷香 Hexiang (Fragrance of Lotus), Shenzhen Museum

七贤 Qixian (7 Nobelities) is kept in Shanghai World Expo Hall
