= Steven R. Galster =

American environmentalist (born 1961)

- Born: December 28, 1961 (age 64); Detroit, Michigan, USA
- Education: George Washington University
- Occupations: Chairman, Freeland
- Notable work: Co-Founder of WildAid; Co-Founder of Wildlife Alliance; Co-designed and launched ASEAN Wildlife Enforcement Network, ASEAN-WEN; Founder of Freeland Foundation
- Website: freeland.org

Steven R. Galster (born December 28, 1961, in Detroit, Michigan) is an American environmental and human rights investigator and counter-trafficking program designer. Since 1987, he has planned and participated in investigations and remedial programs to stop wildlife and human trafficking and to mitigate corruption and build governance in Asia, Africa, Russia, South America, and the USA.

== Education ==
Galster graduated from Grinnell College in 1984 with a B.A. in Liberal Arts, focusing on Political Science and International Relations. He was awarded the Grinnell Alumni Award 25 years later. In 1988, he graduated from George Washington University, with an M.A. in Security Policy Studies. He focused on US-Soviet Cold War relations, with an emphasis on superpower competition along the 3rd World periphery.

== National Security Archive Afghanistan Project ==
Galster led the National Security Archive's Afghanistan Project, which took him to the field with Soviet soldiers and Mujahedeen rebels, where he documented the trafficking in guns and heroin among all combatants. When mainstream media and the White House forecasted a quick rebel victory against the Soviet-backed regime, Galster predicted a protracted war in which hardline rebels would eventually use American-sponsored training and technology against the west.

== Environmental Investigation Agency ==
In the early 90s, Galster led investigations for the Environmental Investigation Agency (EIA) into African elephant and rhino poaching and the nexus with arms trafficking in Central and Southern Africa. His investigations led him to the world's largest illegal stash of rhino horn in southern China. His undercover film of the traffickers with their stockpiles acquired from North Korean diplomats and other sources was aired on CNN and used by Chinese police to locate the contraband and arrest the gang. The Chinese Government then destroyed the stockpile on public TV and reaffirmed their support for a ban on rhino horn trade. Galster led another investigation for the EIA into illegal whale meat trafficking between the South Pacific and Japan. Supported by Filipino activists and fishermen, his findings and covert film were featured on BBC's "Whale Wars," which was released when the International Whaling Commission met in Japan, as governments debated the ban on commercial whaling.

== Operation Amba ==
Hired by the UK-based Tiger Trust, Galster moved to Russia to help design and oversee the development of Operation Amba, a counter-poaching program that aimed to reduce poaching of Siberian tigers in the Far East. Operation Amba has been widely successful, having saved cub tigers, made seizures of illegal poaching materials, and raided illegal operations and poaching rings. It is credited for bringing the Siberian tiger back from the brink of extinction in the mid-1990s and helping stabilize the population after years of heavy poaching.

== Exposing Animal and Human Trafficking – Global Survival Network (GSN) ==
In 1995, Steve Galster and Michael C. Mitchell co-founded the Global Survival Network (GSN), an environmental NGO. Steve Galster served as its executive director. Among its many campaigns, GSN devised and developed the Asian Conservation Awareness Programme (ACAP), with the mission to bring awareness and lead to increased public sympathy for endangered wildlife and decreased consumption of endangered species products. GSN's work included the establishing of the Amur Tiger Sanctuary in Russia. The Sanctuary introduced armed ranger patrols to stop the threat that poachers played in the region. This work was soon funded by the World Wildlife Fund (WWF) and is currently carried out with the support of the Ministry of Natural Resources and Environment (Russia). As a result of this work, the wild Siberian Tiger population has rebounded from their critical endangered level.

In order to strengthen the Sanctuary efforts to stop poaching, Galster conducted undercover video interviews with the poachers. Through these undercover meetings, he discovered a powerful link between animal poachers and human traffickers. What began as an effort to preserve habitat became an international exposé on trafficking. From 1995 to 1997, GSN undertook a two-year undercover investigation personally holding meetings with traffickers and trafficked women to expose the international relationship between animal and human trafficking.

Information and undercover video derived from their investigation were used to create a GSN written report, "Crime & Servitude" and a video documentary, "Bought & Sold". The film was released in 1997 and received widespread media coverage in the US and abroad, including specials on ABC Primetime Live, CNN, and BBC.

The documentary also helped to catalyze legislative reform on trafficking as well as new financial resources to address the problem.

== WildAid ==
With new co-directors, Galster and his new management colleagues re-branded Global Survival Network (GSN) as WildAid. The co-directors included: Suwanna Gauntlett, a major funder of GSN and other organizations, Peter Knights, the originator of ACAP, and Steve Trent to run the organization, which now focused on wildlife crime. WildAid had three broad aims: hunting down and stopping poachers; exposing and eliminating black-market trafficking operations; and using public-awareness campaigns to stop the human consumption of exotic plants and animals. Galster ran WildAid's Bangkok office where he led a campaign to stop people from eating shark fin soup. According to shark fin dealers, the campaign resulted in a 70% reduction in shark fin consumption in Thailand, which prompted outrage by the merchants. Galster and WildAid were sued by Bangkok-based shark fin dealers for $3 million, but after 3 years he and his office won the suit. During this period under WildAid, Galster helped develop a ranger anti-poaching training and support programs in Khao Yai National Park, which evolved into a regional nature protection training center. WildAid partnered with the Wildlife Conservation Society to initiate the training program.

== Wildlife Alliance ==
In 2004, WildAid split into two organizations: WildAid and Wildlife Alliance. Gauntlett ran the latter and Galster stayed with her operation. In October 2004, Galster wrote the opening speech for the 13th UN Convention on International Trade in Endangered Species of Wild Flora and Fauna CITES, delivered by then Thai Prime Minister Thaksin Shinawatra, proposing the creation of a Southeast Asian Regional Wildlife Enforcement Network. The development of the network was funded through Wildlife Alliance, by the US State Department, and later by The United States Agency for International Development with Galster serving as the USAID program head (Chief of Party). Together with other US State Department projects, Galster worked with his senior staff members, to supervise $30 million of USG-sponsored governance, law enforcement, and behavior change activities over the next 10 years to reduce wildlife crimes in Southeast Asia and China.

== Freeland ==
In 2008, wishing to return to the broader mandate of counter wildlife and human trafficking, Steve Galster founded Freeland Foundation now known as Freeland. He served as its first executive director, while remaining the role of USAID's Chief of Party for 3 consecutive USAID programs (total of 11 years) while also hosting 15 TV shows that followed Freeland's counter-trafficking investigations and field operations.

Freeland's mission is to protect vulnerable people and wildlife from being trafficked. Its team of law enforcement, behavior change, and development experts works alongside government officers, local communities and other NGOs in Asia, Africa and the Americas to stop the 200 billion dollar illicit trade in people and wildlife."

Some of Freeland's achievements under Galster's direction and leadership include:

Thailand's Indochinese Tiger: Galster and his Freeland team helped rural villagers climb out of poverty, while establishing an elite ranger force to fight off exploitative traffickers and save this endangered big cat from extinction. It is now a breeding, growing population.

African Elephants: Under Galster's direction, a Freeland-backed Task Force identified and arrested over 40 key corrupt government and corporate officers who were operating between Africa and Asia (between 2015 and 2018). Through Freeland, the African Task Force shared information with their Asian counterparts to begin dismantling the syndicates sponsoring the killings of the African Elephants.

Galster and his Freeland team, with the support of ASEAN Wildlife Enforcement Network (ASEAN-WEN), designed and launched the world's largest and most active and effective cross border wildlife enforcement operations, that was run by 25 governments resulting in unprecedented numbers of arrests and seizures.

Central Asian women were discovered by Freeland to be working as Sex Slaves between Southeast Asia and the Middle East. Freeland's information was used to arrest the traffickers and free dozens of Uzbek victims, many who were repatriated to their homeland.

Burmese Teenage Girls were discovered by Freeland to be working as Sex Slaves in Thailand, and later freed thanks to Freeland-backed undercover operations.

Thai and Vietnamese women were discovered by Freeland to be working as Sex Slaves in Malaysia, recruited through deceitful Facebook ads. A Freeland-backed Task Force freed the women, arrested the Kingpin, and made him financially compensate his victims.

In 2014–2015, Galster and the Freeland team started to investigate the Xaysavang Network, an international wildlife trafficking syndicate that facilitated the killing of endangered elephants, rhinos, pangolins, and other species for products such as ivory and rhino horn. They discovered a wider syndicate encircling this network company, including Vietnamese Organized Crime, corrupt officers from Laos, Thailand, South Africa, and Mozambique. Galster coined the syndicate "Hydra" because it was hydra-headed. Continued attempts to dismantle Hydra ran into bureaucracy, indifference and corruption. Galster investigated and traced the supply chain of Hydra and at least one competitor into Africa, setting up an operation in partnership with the Lusaka Agreement Task Force (LATF) and the African Wildlife Foundation. The Freeland-Africa program helped LATF identify and arrest numerous high level criminals who were supplying illicit elephant tusks, big cat skeletons, pangolin scales, and rhino horns to Asia. Galster and his investigation team provided key insights to The Guardian newspaper's 3-part series on global wildlife trafficking that identified members and modus operandi of Hydra.

== Select News and Documentaries ==
- Time Magazine, "Animal Mob: Organized Crime and the Wildlife Trade" (1994)
- CNN's "In-Focus" on Human Trafficking, former Soviet Union (1997).
- ABC's 20/20 "Shame of Saipan,"
- Washington Post – "Human Rights Groups Urge Action on Saipan"
- Outside Magazine, "War on Wildlife" (2004);
- "Tiger Traffic," BBC (2005)
- Third World Caught Up in Tiger Traffic – The Times
- CNN Anderson Cooper's "Planet in Peril" (2007)
- Host of Discovery Channel – Animal Planet (2007–2010) series, "Crime Scene Wild" (2007-2008)
- New York Times, author of "Tigers Need Conservation, Not Conversation," November 2010.
- Host of National Geographic TV series "Crimes Against Nature" (2011)
- Host of National Geographic Explorer Program's "21st Century Sex Slaves" (2012).
- Featured in New York Times on wildlife kingpins (March 2013)
- Featured in New York Times Sunday Magazine, Opinion (February 2016)
- Featured in The Guardian Newspaper series and follow-ups, September 2016 and January 2018.

== Publications ==
- Afghanistan: The Making of US Policy, 1973–1990, Guide and Index, by Steven Galster.
- Galster, Steven R. (January 2, 1989), "Waiting in Afghanistan: What Will Follow the Pullout?", The Nation, 248 (1)
- Washington, Moscow and the Struggle for Kabul: The Cold War Continues in Afghanistan, by Steven Galster.
- "Rivalry and Reconciliation in Afghanistan: What Prospects for the Accords?" By Steven R. Galster
- Bordering on Treason: The Life and Trial of Arif Durrani.

== Partnerships ==
Galster and Freeland partner with a variety of organizations, including:

- INTERPOL
- United Nations Environment Programme, UNEP
- United Nations Development Programme
- CITES, Convention on International Trade in Endangered Species of Wild Fauna and Flora,
- US State Department
- US Agency for International Development, USAID
- US Fish and Wildlife Service
- Association of Southeast Asian Nations, ASEAN
- Lusaka Agreement Task Force
- United for Wildlife – The Royal Foundation
- International Air Transport Association, IATA
- World Wide Fund for Nature, WWF
- Panthera Corporation
- World Resources Institute, WRI
- IBM
- World Customs Organization
- Asia/Pacific Group on Money Laundering
- General Administration of Customs, China
- Wildlife Alliance
