= Michael C. Mitchell =

American rural planner (born 1946)

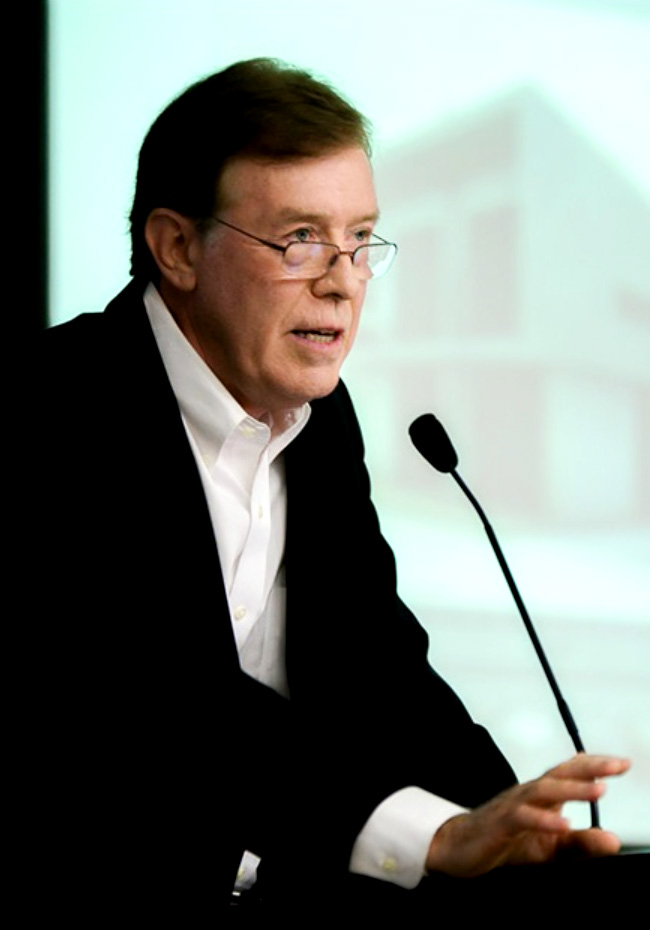
- Mitchell, 2017
- Born: January 4, 1946 (age 80); Portland, Oregon, USA
- Occupations: Planner, designer, lecturer, environmentalist
- Notable work: Group Vice President of the 1984 Los Angeles Olympics; Kahramaa Awareness Park, Doha (Interactive Exhibitions and Attractions); Cangma Mountain Eco-Resort, Qingdao; Executive Producer of the worldwide Live Aid Broadcast
- Website: mcmgroup.com

Michael C. Mitchell (born January 4, 1946) is an American planner, designer, lecturer and environmentalist. He works on rural development.

== Earlier career ==
At Portland State University, Mitchell became one of the organizers of the First Earth Day in 1970, coordinating universities throughout America's northwest states. After his work on the First Earth Day, he was one of ten university students selected from across the nation by President Richard Nixon's Administration to form a national Youth Advisory Board on environmental matters, S.C.O.P.E (Student Council on Pollution and the Environment) was assigned to the U.S. Department of Interior where Mitchell was a reviewer on the creation of the first Environmental Impact Statement (EIS).

Mitchell continued his work with what became the United States Environmental Protection Agency (EPA), writing an environmental education program for students.

== MCM Group International ==
MCM Group is an international planning and design firm headquartered in Los Angeles. Founded in 1984 by Michael C. Mitchell after the close of the Los Angeles Olympic Games, where he served as the head of planning and operations, the firm has sought to expand those planning techniques as a model to address prominent social problems. MCM Group provides feasibility consulting, planning, architecture, landscape design and sustainable engineering services. Mitchell has developed offices in Tokyo, Moscow, Middle East offices in Doha, Qatar, an African base in Nairobi, Kenya and currently four offices in China, with its headquarters in Beijing.

== 1984 Los Angeles Summer Olympic Games ==
In the early 1980s, Mitchell was recruited by the Los Angeles Olympic Organizing Committee, where he served as the Group vice-president of Planning and Control (Finance). Among his duties included overseeing the planning of the Olympic venues and supervising the architectural department's venue planning. During the Olympics he was responsible for the Games Operations Center and oversaw the closeout of the Games after their completion.

He has since served as a senior planning consultant to six other Olympic Games and four World Fairs.

== LA84 Foundation ==
As head of the close-out operations after the completion of the Los Angeles 1984 Summer Olympics, Mitchell oversaw the creation of the LA84 Foundation, which was formed out of the $225 million surplus from the operations of the Games. The Foundation is now a national leader in supporting youth programs, providing recreation and learning opportunities to disadvantaged youth, training youth coaches and convening national conferences on youth sports issues.

== Live Aid ==
In the Spring of 1985, Mitchell was contacted by Bob Geldof, an Irish rock musician, that had been working on issues of drought and famine in Africa. Geldof asked Mitchell to produce a worldwide televised music show to raise funds to help alleviate the catastrophic consequences of the worst African famine in a century.

Mitchell became the Executive Producer of the worldwide Live Aid broadcast (under a newly formed venture Worldwide Sports and Entertainment) and President of the Live Aid Foundation in America.

The July 13, 1985 broadcast was the world's first large globally interactive show seen by 1.5 billion viewers in 150 countries. Whereas the 1984 Olympics utilized three satellites to beam from one location around the world, Live Aid utilized thirteen satellites sending and receiving concerts from seven locations from around the world and producing one international feed back to the 150 nations. Despite 1985 being at the height of the Cold War, Mitchell established a global broadcast with a live concert from the Soviet Union featuring Autograph, and a delayed Live Aid showing in China.

President Ronald Reagan's Administration supported the Live Aid Foundation by providing wheat from America's reserves and awarded Mitchell a Presidential Citation for the Live Aid Foundation's contributions to humanity.

== NFIE ==
Mitchell continued his contributions to social and education programs by accepting an appointment to the Board of the National Education Association's Foundation for the Improvement of Education (NFIE), serving on the board from 1987 to 1997. Since its beginning in 1969, the Foundation has served as a laboratory of learning, offering funding and other resources to public school educators, their schools, and districts to solve complex teaching and learning challenges.

== Fund for Democracy and Development ==
During the dissolution of the Soviet Union starting in 1990, Russia and Ukraine experienced a severe shortage of medical and food supplies. Working throughout both countries witnessing first-hand the growing crisis, Mitchell and his close friend, Yankel Ginzburg, an American artist and humanitarian, who had family in Tver, Russia, responded to requests by Russia's leadership for assistance, co-founding the "Fund for Democracy and Development" to provide aid to alleviate the crisis.

Mitchell served as the founding board chairman in 1991 and L. Ronald Scheman (co-founder of the Pan American Development Foundation, where his work included providing financial assistance to low-income rural communities), served as the first President. Past President Richard M. Nixon served as the honorary chairman of the Fund.

From 1991 to 1994 the Fund is credited with channeling 240 million dollars' worth of staples and food supplies to the former Soviet Union. As gratitude for the contributions of the Fund, the Russian government commissioned a monument park to reflect American goodwill.

== Amur Tiger Sanctuary ==
With offices established in Moscow and St. Petersburg, Mitchell contributed to several rural development and environmental projects across the former Soviet Union. Mitchell's planning of development projects in rural Russia included work in Siberia on sustainable resource and forest management practices.

While undertaking those projects in conjunction with local wildlife scientists Mitchell convinced the Prime Minister of Russia, Viktor Chernomyrdin, to establish the Amur Tiger Sanctuary in 1993, which was initially funded through the Global Survival Network (GSN), an environmental organization he co-founded with Steve Galster now of Freeland Foundation.

The Sanctuary included introducing armed ranger patrols to stop the threat that poachers played in the region. The initial work that Mitchell and the executive director of GSN, Steve Galster, did to establish the sanctuary was soon funded by the World Wildlife Fund (WWF), now known as World Wide Fund for Nature, and is currently carried out with the support of the Ministry of Natural Resources and Environment (Russia). As a result of this work, the wild Siberian Tiger population has rebounded from their critical endangered level.

== Exposing animal and human trafficking ==
In order to strengthen the Sanctuary efforts to stop poaching, Mitchell worked with Steve Galster conducting undercover video interviews with the poachers. Through these undercover meetings, he and Galster discovered a link between animal poachers and human traffickers. What began as an effort to preserve habitat became an international exposé on trafficking. From 1995 to 1997 they undertook a two-year undercover investigation personally holding meetings with traffickers and trafficked women to expose the international relationship between animal and human trafficking.

Information and undercover video derived from their investigation were used to create a GSN written report, "Crime & Servitude" and a video documentary, "Bought & Sold." The film was released in 1997 and received widespread media coverage in the US and abroad, including specials on ABC Primetime Live, CNN, and BBC.

The documentary also helped to catalyze legislative reform on trafficking as well as new financial resources to address the problem.

Galster took what was learned during that undercover period and continues this work, founding the Freeland Foundation, which is the lead implementing partner of Asia's Regional Response to Endangered Species Trafficking (ARREST), a program sponsored by the U.S. government in partnership with ASEAN and over fifty governmental and non-governmental organizations.

The material that was collected during those two years is housed at the Human Rights Documentation Initiative (HRDI), The University of Texas at Austin

== United Nations Day of Tolerance ==
Beginning in 1985, Mitchell began an association with Irving Sarnoff, the executive director of Friends of the United Nations (FOTUN), and his co-founder, Dr. Noel Brown, Director of the United Nations Environmental Program (UNEP), North America. The Friends of the United Nations is an NGO dedicated to advocating support for programs of the United Nations.

As part of their work on international social issues Mitchell was asked to create a celebration for the United Nations International Day for Tolerance in 1999. The International Day for Tolerance is an annual observation declared by UNESCO in 1995 to generate public awareness of the dangers of intolerance.

Mitchell organized the 1999 event honoring Mikhail Gorbachev, former leader of the Soviet Union and Arnold Schwarzenegger, actor, politician and Chairman of the USC Schwarzenegger Institute of State and Global Policy. Keynote speakers included John Kerry, U.S. Senator and U.S. Secretary of State.

== Rural development ==
One of the first projects integrating agricultural development, sustainability, community and social values, and economic growth was in a region of Qingdao, China where his company, MCM Group, brought international blueberry agricultural experts to develop what is considered now one of the world's largest blueberry farms (The Qingdao Cangma Mountain Development). The project included hi-technology organic agriculture, agritourism, educational programs, local culture and residential development to provide the local rural community with a successful economic transition.

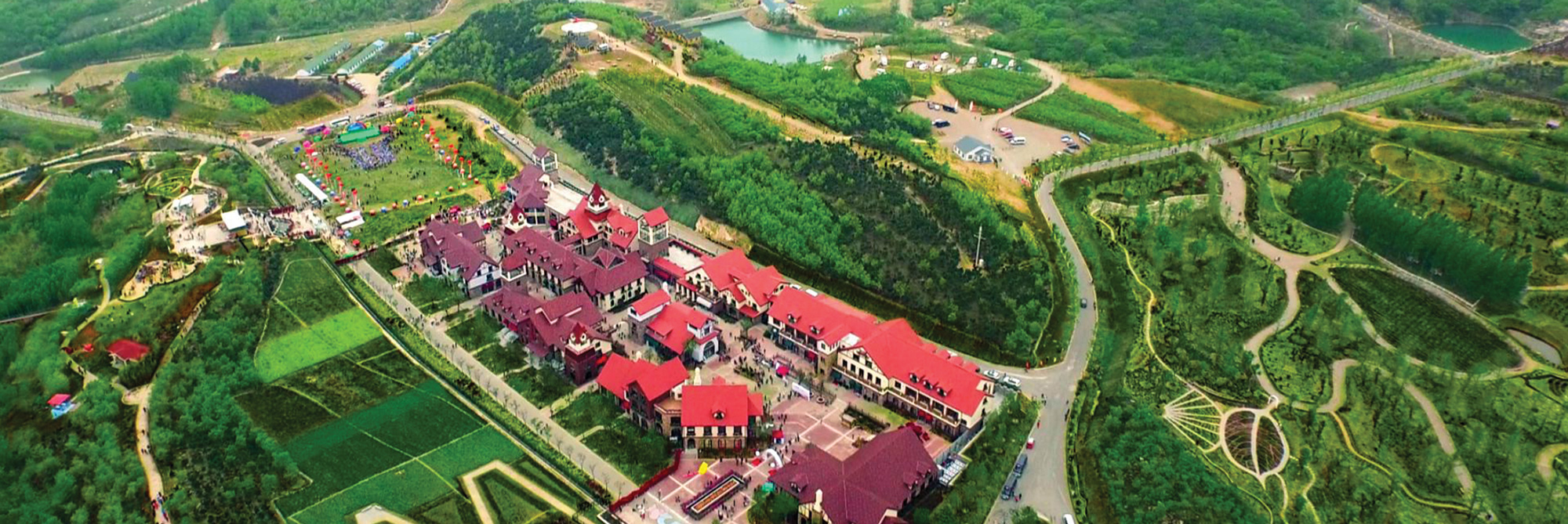
Cangma Mountain Eco-Resort, Qingdao, China

== Lectures and education ==
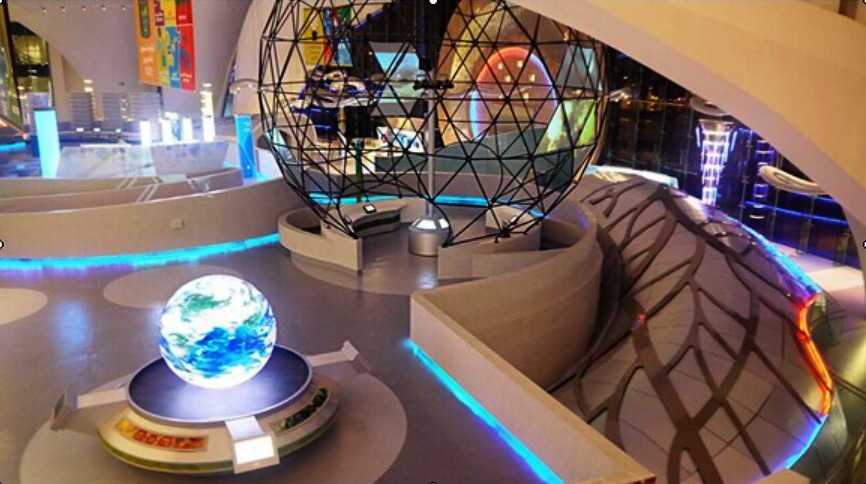
Kahramaa Awareness Park — Doha, Qatar

Invited by universities in the U.S., China, South Korea and Japan, he has given lectures and planning studios, sharing his professional experience with students and faculty members.

- University of Michigan, ERB Institute for Global Sustainable Enterprise – "Sustainability, Design Thinking, and Business Strategies: Developing 'Optimal Environments' in China" - March, 2011
- "Experiential Design," Lecture at Tianjin University of Technology, April 20, 2012
- Featured speaker at China's first International Architectural Education Forum held at Tianjin University, along with Karl Otto Ellefsen, the Director of the Oslo School of Architecture and President of the European Association for Architectural Education, and Preston Scott Cohen, Professor of Architecture at Harvard Graduate School of Design, September, 2014.
- Keynote Address at Sino-US International Design Exhibition – Los Angeles, September 3, 2016
- Huaqiao University, College of Tourism, November 2016
- Tianjin Association of City Planning – Master Lecture, May 11, 2017
- Keynote Speaker – "Digital Brings Changes to Entertainment Experience," at Tianjin's Design Week themed – "The Future is Now," May 13, 2017
- New Urbanism & Agritourism Research Program – July 22, 2017
- Led meeting of the New Urbanism and Agritourism Research Program in Beijing, 2017. The program won full support from enterprises, universities and social groups including China's Association of Mayors, Tsinghua University School of Social Sciences, Digital China, China State Farming Agriculture Group, Agricultural Valley Research Institute, Shandong University of Arts, Tourism College of Huaqiao University, CSA, Beijing Qunxue Urban and Rural Community Social Development Research Institute and Taiwan Rural Tourism Association (reference).

He also initiated internship programs providing Chinese and African students with opportunities to receive training in MCM offices.

== Recognition ==
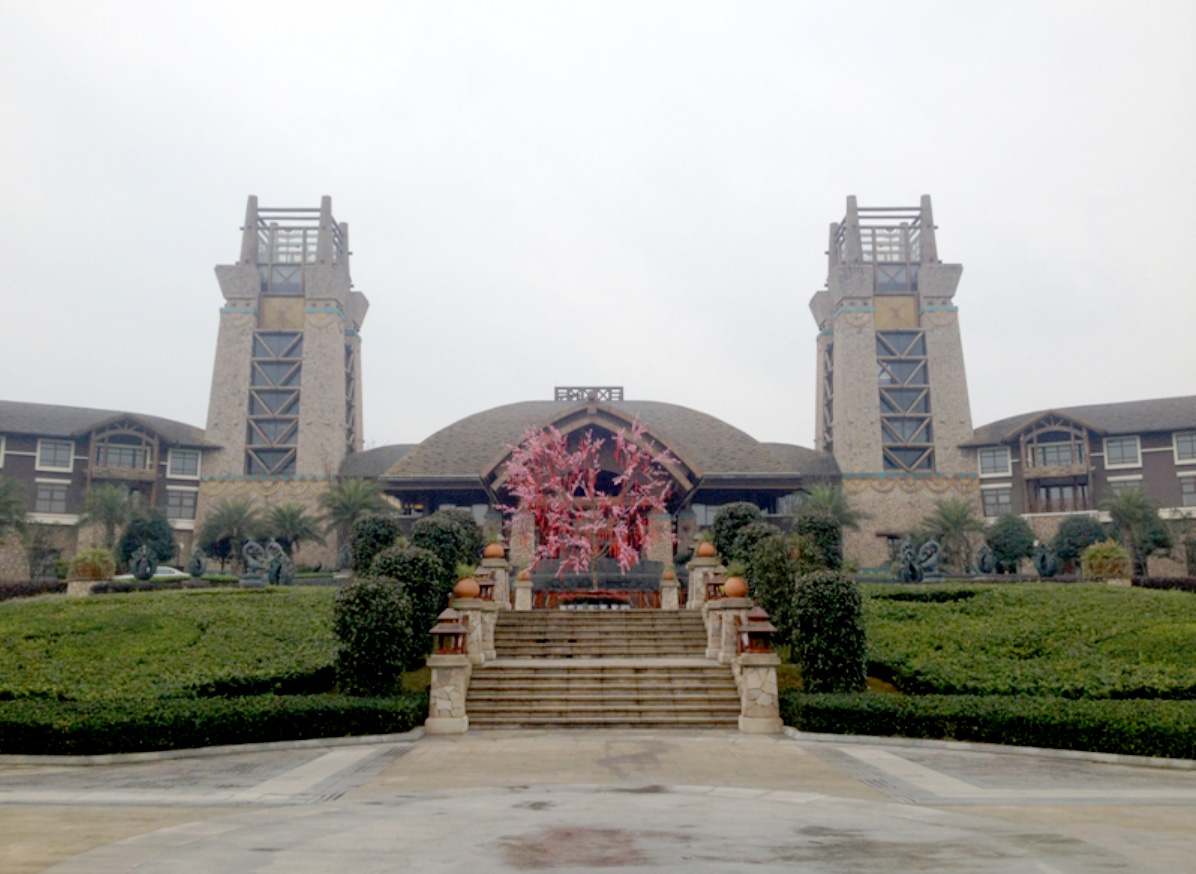
Mt. Emei Resort & Spa, China

- 1984 : Los Angeles Olympics Organizing Committee – Recognition and Appreciation for Contribution to the Success of the Los Angeles Olympic Games, 1984.
- 1984 : Plaque, Michael C. Mitchell, Group Vice-President Planning and Control, Los Angeles Olympics Organizing Committee – Games of the XXIIIrd Olympiad, July 28-August 12, 1984.
- 1985 : Presidential Citation for the Live Aid Foundation's contributions to humanity, President Regan.
- 1994 : Honorary Member of the Russian Academy of Sciences
- 2013: World Hotel Association – Continental Diamond Award for Design
- 2013 : Gold Award for Design, Society of American Registered Architects(SARA), Project – Youth Olympic Games 2014
- 2013 : Bronze Award for Design, Society of American Registered Architects(SARA), Project: COFCO ECO Resort and Attraction, Agriculture Ecological Valley Development, Beijing
- 2014 : Design Award of Merit, Society of American Registered Architects(SARA), Project -Tianjin Stadium Redevelopment
- 2016: Selected to exhibit Cangma Mountain Development, 2015, at Time Space Existence – 2016, Palazzo Mora, Venice Biennale of Architecture.

== Memberships & Affiliations ==
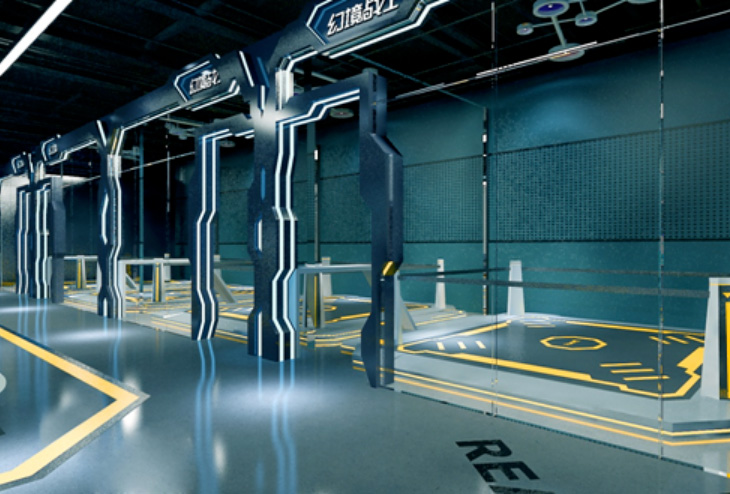
Children's Virtual Reality Center, China

- Urban Land Institute
- American Farmland Trust
- Association of Children's Museums
- International Association of Amusement Parks and Attractions
- International Association for China Planning.

== Recent Publications ==
- Contributing writer on sustainable issues for "Green" a publication of Domus Magazine (2012-2013)
- Collection of Creative & Design magazine, Tianjin University Press, about MCM's Qinghe Snoopy Theme Park, February 2015
- China Real Estate Business, Architecture Section, "Always With You," about MCM's Qinghe Snoopy Theme Park, July 5, 2015
- Originated Magazine, November 11, 2016
- China People's Daily, Beijing, "MCM Designing Beautiful Country," National Launch of Luneng's "Beautiful Countryside", January 19, 2017
