= ASEAN Wildlife Enforcement Network =

Intergovernmental initiative

ASEAN Wildlife Enforcement Network (ASEAN-WEN)
- Founded: 1 December 2005
- Type: Intergovernmental organization
- Location: Bangkok, Thailand Members are all ten ASEAN nations (Brunei Darussalam, Cambodia, Indonesia, Lao PDR, Malaysia, Myanmar, Philippines, Singapore, Thailand, Viet Nam)
- Region served: Southeast Asia
- Products: ID sheets on protected flora and fauna, quarterly newsletter, quarterly action updates, law enforcement training manuals and packages
- Website: www.asean-wen.org

The ASEAN Wildlife Enforcement Network (ASEAN-WEN) was officially launched on 1 December 2005, as a regional inter-agency and inter-governmental initiative to counter the illegal cross-border trade in endangered flora and fauna. It helps countries share information on and tackle cross-border wildlife crime and facilitates the exchange of regional best practices in combating those crimes. As the world's largest wildlife law enforcement network, it comprises the law enforcement agencies of the 10 ASEAN countries (Brunei, Cambodia, Indonesia, Laos, Malaysia, Myanmar, the Philippines, Singapore, Vietnam and Thailand) forming a regional intergovernmental law-enforcement network.

== Overview ==
The establishment of ASEAN-WEN was a response by the governments of Southeast Asia to the illegal wildlife trade. ASEAN-WEN addresses illegal exploitation and trade in CITES-listed endangered species within the ASEAN region. ASEAN-WEN promotes implementation of national wildlife protection laws and international species protection treaties, with the goal of reducing illegal wildlife trade in Southeast Asia through the dismantlement of the region's major wildlife trafficking networks. ASEAN-WEN works closely with the ASEAN Secretariat in Jakarta, Indonesia.

=== Partners ===
ASEAN-WEN is supported by USAID, the US Agency for International Development. Non-governmental organization partners include FREELAND Foundation, and TRAFFIC, the international wildlife trade monitoring network. ASEAN-WEN has developed links with partner countries and intergovernmental organizations such as the CITES Secretariat (Convention on International Trade in Endangered Species), the United States, Interpol, the United Nations Office on for Drugs and Crime (UNODC), the United Nations Environment Program (UNEP), ASEAN Centre for Biodiversity (ACB), The World Bank, Global Tiger Initiative, and the World Customs Organization (WCO). The network is building partnerships with China, South Asia, the European Community, Africa (through the Lusaka Agreement Task Force) Australia and New Zealand.

=== History and background ===
In October 2004, ASEAN Ministers expressed their support for cooperation to improve CITES implementation. In May 2005, the ASEAN Regional Action Plan on Trade in Wild Fauna and Flora (2005–2010) was developed. The plan, which includes the ASEAN-WEN, was adopted the following August in Phnom Penh during the meeting of the ASEAN Senior Officials on Forestry (ASOF).

ASEAN-WEN is mentioned under Objective Two of the Action Plan to encourage networking among law enforcement authorities in ASEAN countries to counter the illegal trade in wild fauna and flora.

The ASEAN-WEN was established on 1 December 2005 in Bangkok.

The Law Enforcement Extension Office (LEEO) of the ASEAN WEN PCU was created in 2008 through an agreement with the Royal Thai Government, the ASEAN-WEN Support Program (2005–2010), the ASEAN Secretariat, and the US State Department. The LEEO is tasked with the support and coordination of operational law enforcement matters and transnational wildlife investigations. The LEEO is staffed by seconded officers from the Royal Thai Police, Department of National Parks, Wildlife and Plant Conservation (DNP) and the Customs Department, and is housed at the Natural Resources and Environmental Crimes Suppression Division of the Royal Thai Police. The inaugural lead officer of the LEEO was Police Major General Surasit Sangkaphong (2008–2009), formally appointed by the Royal Thai Police to lead the LEEO. In 2010, the ASEAN-WEN Support Program, the Malaysian Government (then acting as the Country Chair of ASEAN-WEN), and the Department of National Parks, Wildlife and Plant Conservation approved of the creation of the post of Chief Technical Advisor for Law Enforcement to formally lead the LEEO. From 2010 to 2012, Police General Dr. Chanvut Vajrabukka (Ret.), former Deputy Commissioner-General of the Royal Thai Police, and Immigration Commissioner of Thailand held the position of LEEO Chief Technical Advisor. From 2013–Present, Honorable Police Captain Dr. Vatanarak Amnucksoradej, former INTERPOL Thailand in charge of environmental crime issue, former Advisor to Minister of Science and Technology, Elected Member of Parliament - Bangkok District 10 and Advisor on many Standing Committees, House of Representative, Kingdom of Thailand. He is currently hold the position as Director of ASEAN Wildlife Enforcement Network Law Enforcement Extension Office. Dr.Vatanarak received his bachelor, master and doctor degree with Summa Cum Laude (first class honor) from prestige universities in USA. Currently, the ASEAN-WEN LEEO is stationary at Natural Resources and Environment Crime Division, Royal Thai Police (RTP).

Under the PCU, with the overall guidance from ASEAN-WEN/ASEAN Member States, the LEEO leads ASEAN-WEN PCU's partnership building with INTERPOL, the World Customs Organization (WCO), ASEANAPOL and other enforcement agencies. On September 29, 2011, Thailand's Commissioner General of Police formally approved linking the ASEAN Wildlife Enforcement Network (ASEAN-WEN) Law Enforcement Extension Office (LEEO) with the Royal Thai Police - Transnational Crime Coordination Center's (TNCCC). This decision allows the LEEO to begin providing Thailand's Wildlife Enforcement Network with new technical resources, information and assistance in its fight against nature crime. It also clears the way for it to eventually serve the same function at the regional level, serving as ASEAN-WEN's regional wildlife crime suppression and intelligence arm. Currently, ASEAN-WEN and the LEEO is supported by the USAID funded Asia's Regional Response to Endangered Species Trafficking (ARREST) Program, together with in-kind and financial support from the Royal Thai Government.

=== Need ===
Wildlife smugglers are often part of organized criminal syndicates, taking advantage of Asia's transport infrastructure to traffic wildlife within and out of the region. Environmental agencies and NGOs do not possess the authority or the capacity to stop organized crime. ASEAN-WEN facilitates a multi-agency and cross-border response, including police, customs and the judiciary. The US Secretary of State highlighted the urgency of strengthening partnerships with networks like ASEAN-WEN hoping to building similar networks in South Asia and Central America.

=== National and regional structure ===
ASEAN-WEN involves CITES authorities, customs, police, prosecutors, specialized governmental wildlife-law enforcement organizations and other relevant national law enforcement agencies from across the ASEAN region.

ASEAN-WEN operates on national and regional levels. Each country is expected to establish a national inter-agency task force of police, customs, and environmental officers. The Kingdom of Thailand, the Philippines, Cambodia, Indonesia and Malaysia have established national task forces. Lao PDR and Viet Nam are preparing to establish their national task forces very soon. Law enforcement officers in national task forces receive training on investigations, species identification and wildlife laws.

=== Secretariat ===
The Secretariat of the ASEAN-WEN was the ASEAN-WEN Program Coordination Unit (PCU), located in Bangkok, Thailand. The secretariat is now located in Jakarta, Indonesia.

=== ARREST Program (Asia’s Regional Response to Endangered Species Trafficking) ===
Together with the ASEAN Member States, ASEAN-WEN is supported by the ARREST Program (Asia's Regional Response to Endangered Species Trafficking): ARREST is a five-year program funded by US Agency for International Development (USAID) and implemented by FREELAND Foundation. The program is fighting the trafficking of illegal wildlife in Asia in three ways: reducing consumer demand; strengthening law enforcement; and strengthening regional cooperation and anti-trafficking networks. ARREST unites the efforts of the member states of ASEAN, China and South Asia, NGOs, and private sector organizations.

=== Areas of involvement and training ===
U.S-Government sponsored ASEAN-WEN training courses and workshops are taking place across Southeast Asia. On-the-job training delivered by law enforcement experts assisting ASEAN-WEN is imparting knowledge and support to these authorities.

=== Illegal wildlife trade in Southeast Asia ===
Trade in endangered species in Southeast Asia has devastating impacts on the region's biodiversity, disturbing ecological balances and undermining environmental services. This, in turn impacts the people of Southeast Asia and their well-being. The multibillion-dollar illegal wildlife trade supplies one of the world's largest black markets, surpassed only by illicit commerce in arms and drugs. The illicit harvesting of natural resources has been defined as a form of transnational organized environmental crime driving species to extinction by the United Nations Office of Drugs and Crime (UNODC) in their report “The Globalization of Organized Crime- A Transnational Organized Crime Threat Assessment"

A World Bank report from 2008 states that the Southeast Asian region functions as a key supplier for global demand for protected wildlife, as well as a consumer and a global transit point - three roles that make the region a crucial area to address in the global fight against illicit trade.

The International Union for Conservation of Nature (IUCN) reports that Southeast Asian countries rank among the highest in the world for density of endangered species. Nine countries in the world's top 20-list of countries with the most endangered mammal species are in Southeast Asia.

Biodiversity, including endemic species of flora and fauna, is part of the ecological heritage of the region. Despite laws and treaties, this resource is being sold off illegally to consumers in East Asia, in Europe and in North America at an unsustainable rate.

However, law enforcement efforts to protect Southeast Asia's endangered species are increasing. In 2008, 67 major and model law enforcement actions by Southeast Asian authorities were reported to the network. More than 31,590 live animals and 31,684 dead animals, animal parts and derivatives were recovered, which adds up to over 53 tons of seized wildlife.

In 2009, there were 140 reported major and model law enforcement actions by Southeast Asian authorities. More than 26,261 live animals were rescued from illegal trade along with almost 10,000 deceased animals, animal parts and derivates (over 268 tons of seized wildlife) during these interdictions. According to estimates by wildlife authorities and non-governmental organizations, this confiscated contraband was worth more than US$40 million on the black market. In addition, there were 156 related arrests and 45 convictions across seven countries during 2009.

==== Drivers of illegal wildlife trade ====
The drivers of the illegal wildlife trade include demand for bones, scales and other ingredients for traditional medicines; demand for live animals as pets and zoo exhibits; demand for their parts and bodies as collectors’ trophies; decorations and luxury items; demand for wild meat and exotic dishes from restaurants, etc. In Southeast Asia, wealth seems to be a stronger driver for illegal wildlife trade than poverty.

Demand for wildlife has grown along with growing wealth in Asia. It is reported that there is hardly any species of flora or fauna that has not yet been traded for a valuable part of it, and that, the rarer a species, the more money are customers willing to pay for it. Amongst other reasons contributing to the exploitation of Southeast Asia's natural resources are the region's high biodiversity, porous borders, well-established trade routes and accessible transport links.

Consumers with computer access can procure illicit wildlife products from an online marketplace, and poor awareness about the importance of conservation and impacts of over-exploitation has also contributed to the destruction of the region's fauna and flora.

Main Article: What's Driving the Illegal Wildlife Trade?, World Bank Report 2008 See also: Wildlife Trade- what is it?

==== Extent and consequences of illegal wildlife trade ====
Some estimate the value of the illegal wildlife trade at a minimum of US$5 billion and may exceed US$20billion annually. For estimates, see:

- US Interagency Working Group, International Crime Threat Assessment Report
- US Department of State, Bureau of Oceans and International Environment and Scientific Affairs
- United Kingdom National Wildlife Crime Unit
- INTERPOL, Wildlife Crime

Scientists predict 13-42% of Southeast Asia's animal and plant species could be wiped out this century. At least half those losses would represent global extinctions. Poaching and illegal wildlife trade contribute to this trend. Populations of species of high commercial value have already drastically declined (e.g. Tiger subspecies (Endangered Subspecies of Tiger), the Javan Rhinoceros, the Asian elephant, the Pangolin, freshwater turtles and tortoises and wild orchids in Southeast Asia. With scientists predicting severe impacts from a changing climate, reducing other man-induced pressures on biodiversity and ecosystems, such as poaching, is imperative. Illegal wildlife trade also threatens sustainable development in rural and coastal communities, as it destroys those natural and biological resources upon which thousands of people around the globe depend for their livelihoods. Moreover, human health is endangered by unregulated trade in wild animals that can spread and pass on viruses and zoonotic diseases. SARS and Avian Influenza, for example, were transferred by wild animals to human beings. The lack of health standards within the trade chains increase the transmission of diseases to people, who come into contact with trafficked live or deceased animals.

Another consequence is the strengthening of organized crime. Profits from illegal wildlife trade, which now ranks among the most lucrative types of black market commerce, can support other forms of criminal activity. Links are now being detected between wildlife crime, drug trafficking and human trafficking.

==== Challenges ====
With generally weak laws governing wildlife trade, low penalties and limited awareness of the problem among the civil population, criminals see an opportunity to make money trafficking wildlife with very little risk. ASEAN-WEN is working with policy makers and courts across Southeast Asia to strengthen laws and close loopholes. To strengthen law enforcement capabilities, ASEAN-WEN and its partners hold law enforcement training courses and workshops for ASEAN Member Country authorities.

Because of the lack of public awareness about illegal wildlife trade, ASEAN-WEN works with government and non-government partners to increase awareness of protected species and the dangers that wildlife trafficking poses to the environment, human health and security.

=== Success stories ===
The launch of the network has created a framework for continued long-term cooperation to stop illegal wildlife trade in Southeast Asia. ASEAN-WEN is the largest such inter-governmental initiative dedicated to tackling wildlife crime. Species identification guides, training manuals and instructor guides have been developed in local languages.

Since 2008, ASEAN authorities have reported more than 200 wildlife law enforcement actions across the region, almost 58,000 seized live animals, 42,000 seized deceased animals and derivatives and have done more than 200 arrests. The black market value of seized contraband in the ASEAN region during this period is estimated to be in excess of US$45million.

== See also ==
- Endangered Species
- Wildlife smuggling, Wildlife trade
- CITES- Convention on the International Trade in Endangered Species
- Biodiversity, Biodiversity hotspot
- Endangered Species Act
- Extinction, Mass extinction
- IUCN Red List
- IUCN
