= WildAid =

Environmental organization

- Headquarters: 220 Montgomery Street, Suite 437, San Francisco, California, United States
- Coordinates: 37.791944°N 122.401667°W
- CEO: Meaghan Brosnan
- Chief Program Officer: John Baker
- Website: wildaid.org

WildAid is an environmental organization based in San Francisco, California, United States.

WildAid focuses on reducing the demand for wildlife products. WildAid works with Asian, Western celebrities and business leaders to dissuade people from purchasing wildlife products via public service announcements and educational initiatives hence reaching hundreds of millions of people per year.

WildAid operates a field program in the Galapagos Islands, protecting the Galápagos Marine Reserve, apprehending poachers and smugglers and creating economic alternatives to local communities. WildAid works with media, governments, celebrities and local partners as well as communities worldwide to make wildlife conservation a global priority. WildAid has partnered with organizations such as the African Wildlife Foundation, the David and Lucile Packard Foundation, and Shark Savers. Charity Navigator has given WildAid a perfect score of 100.00 since December 1, 2016.

== History ==
WildAid was originally founded in 1995 by Steven R. Galster and Michael C. Mitchell under the name Global Survival Network (GSN). GSN was an environmental NGO which focused on countering wildlife and human trafficking. At GSN, Peter Knights ran a successful program to reduce demand for wildlife.

Galster conducted undercover video with poachers to strengthen attempts to prevent poaching. Galster's undercover meetings revealed a strong connection between animal poachers and human traffickers, which led the GSN to make efforts to combat human trafficking. From 1995-1997 GSN personally undertook a two-year undercover investigation into the international relationship between animal and human trafficking, which included personal meetings with human traffickers and trafficked women.

Video footage and information from the investigation was used to create a GSN written report, "Crime & Servitude", and a 1997 video documentary, Bought & Sold. Upon its release, Bought & Sold received widespread media coverage in the US and internationally, and was featured in specials on ABC Primetime Live, CNN, and BBC. The documentary contributed to the development of new legislative reforms and financial initiatives to combat human trafficking. The materials that were collected during the two year exposé are housed at the Human Rights Documentation Initiative (HRDI), The University of Texas at Austin.

=== Rebranding as WildAid ===
In 2000, Galster, Gauntlett, Knights and a colleague of theirs, Steve Trent, teamed up to strengthen GSN, focus it on the environment, and re-brand it as "WildAid". Eventually, WildAid's four co-directors split up and formed four different organizations with different areas of focus: Trent founded the Environmental Justice Foundation in 2001, Gauntlett formed Wildlife Alliance in 2004, Galster founded the Freeland Foundation in 2008 to continue the fight against human trafficking, and Knights maintained directorship of WildAid. Today, WildAid works in the United States, the United Kingdom, Canada, China, Indonesia, India, and Ecuador with headquarters in San Francisco, California. In 2014 WildAid merged with Shark Savers, a non-profit committed to the conservation of sharks.

In 2019, WildAid partnered with the government of Thailand and the United States Agency for International Development to launch "A Good Life is Free of Killing", a campaign to end wildlife trafficking.

=== Public awareness campaigns ===
In 2016, Arnold Schwarzenegger collaborated on a campaign, starring in the PSA, "Less Meat, Less Heat," that encourages people to eat less meat as a means of combating climate change.

In 2017, Jackie Chan made a public service announcement called WildAid: Jackie Chan & Pangolins (Kung Fu Pangolin) WildAid's Shark Conservation Program has focused on reducing demand for sharkfin and shark products in China, by enlisting celebrity ambassadors and creating local environmental campaigns. A 2016 survey in China found that 80% of respondents had seen WildAid campaign messages, and 98.8% agreed that the campaigns successfully raised awareness of shark conservation. Michelle Yeoh recorded a public service announcement (PSA) supporting WildAid activities with elephants.

WildAid's "Poaching Steals From Us All" campaign focused on raising awareness of the threat poaching posed to animals such as the Rhinoceros, partnering with celebrities such as Danai Gurira, Bryce Dallas Howard, and the filmmakers of Jurassic World. WildAid partnered with Plan B Media in 2019 to promote awareness of shark preservation and discourage the widespread practice of sharkfin soup consumption in Taiwan.

Yao Ming, Leonardo DiCaprio, Harrison Ford, Jane Goodall, Kate Hudson, and Amitabh Bachchan are among their celebrity ambassadors.
