= Wildlife trade =

Worldwide industry dealing in the acquisition and sale of wildlife

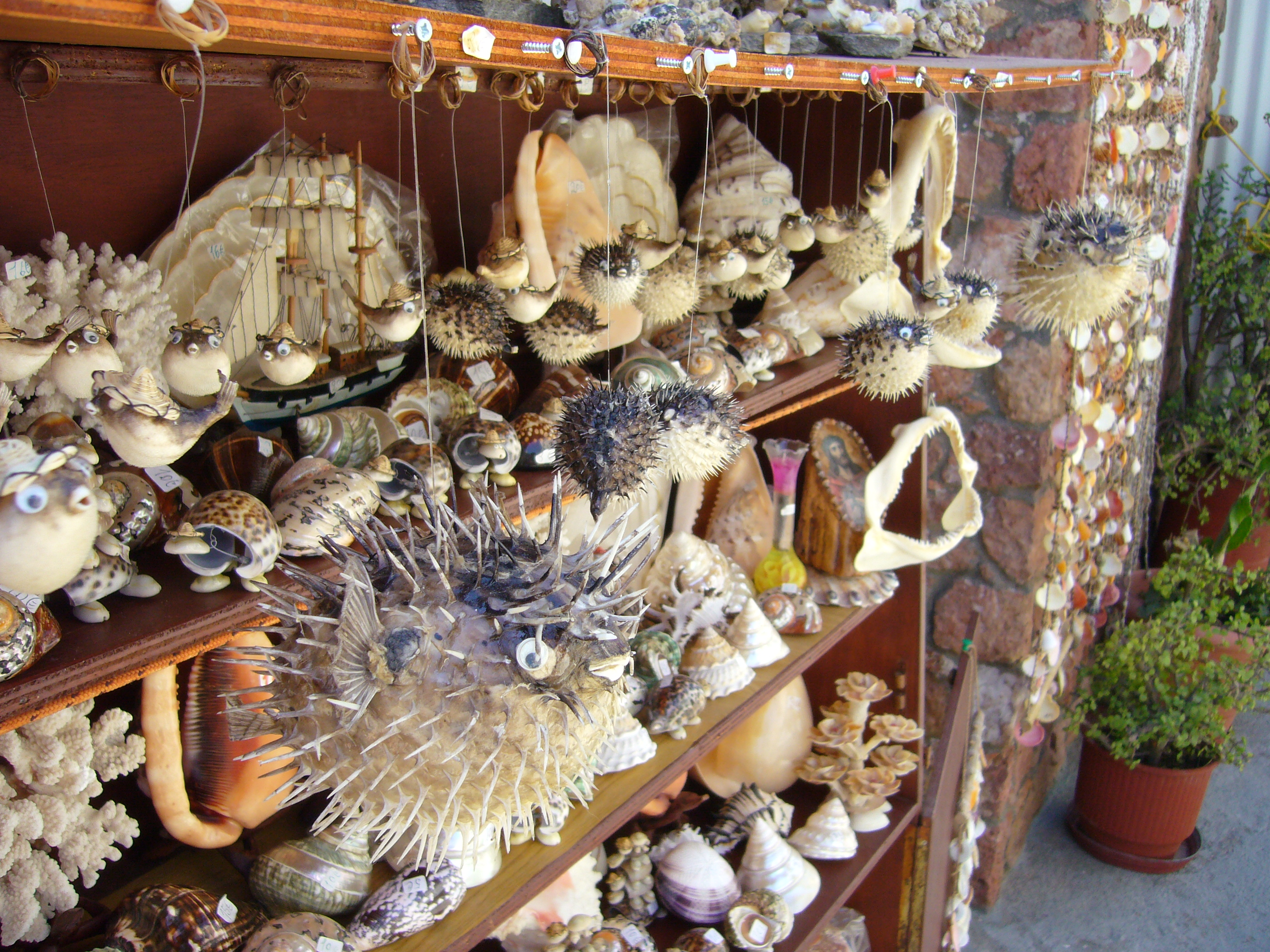
Assorted seashells, coral, shark jaws and dried blowfish on sale in Greece

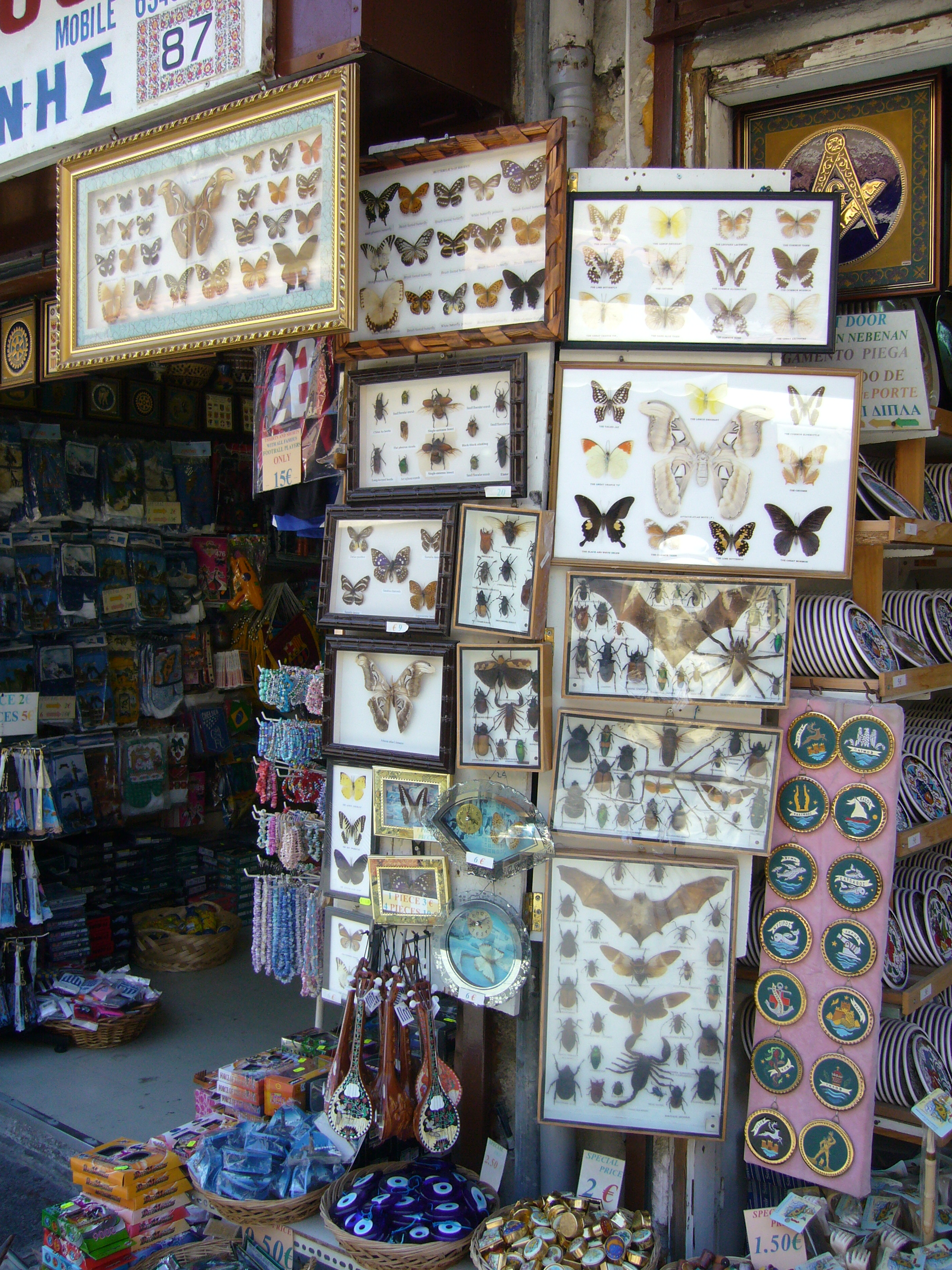
Framed butterflies, moths, beetles, bats, Emperor scorpions and tarantula spiders on sale in Rhodes, Greece

Wildlife trade refers to the exchange of products derived from non-domesticated animals or plants usually extracted from their natural environment or raised under controlled conditions. It can involve the trade of living or dead individuals, tissues such as skins, bones or meat, or other products. Legal wildlife trade is regulated by the United Nations' Convention on International Trade in Endangered Species of Wild Fauna and Flora (CITES), which currently has 184 member countries called Parties. Illegal wildlife trade is widespread and constitutes one of the major illegal economic activities, comparable to the traffic of drugs and weapons.

Wildlife trade is a serious conservation problem, has a negative effect on the viability of many wildlife populations and is one of the major threats to the survival of vertebrate species. The illegal wildlife trade has been linked to the emergence and spread of new infectious diseases in humans, including emergent viruses. Global initiatives like the United Nations Sustainable Development Goal 15 have a target to end the illegal supply of wildlife.

== Terminology ==
Wildlife use is a general term for all uses of wildlife products, including ritual or religious uses, consumption of bushmeat and different forms of trade. Wildlife use is usually associated with hunting or poaching. Wildlife trade can be differentiated in legal and illegal trade, and both can have domestic (local or national) or international markets, but they might be often related to each other.

== Ineffective monitoring of international wildlife trade ==
The volume of international trade in wildlife commodities is immense and continues to rise. According to an analysis on the 2012 Harmonized System customs statistics, global import of wildlife products amounted to US$187 billion, of which fisheries commodities accounted for $113 billion; plants and forestry products for $71 billion; non-fishery animal for $3 billion including live animals, parts and derivatives.

However, the global trade of wildlife commodities is ineffectively monitored and accounted for due to the constraint of the HS Code System used by the customs worldwide. The majority of international imports of wildlife are only recorded in extremely basic and general categories, such as 'plant' or 'animal products', with no further taxonomic detail. It is estimated that nearly 50% of the global import of plant and 70% of animal products are imported as general categories, with an exception for fisheries (ca. 5%), thanks to various multilateral fishery management agreements that requires taxon-specific fish catch reporting.

Many jurisdictions rely on the declared HS Code of the consignments for detection and prosecution of illegal wildlife import. The lack of specificity of HS Code precludes effective monitoring and traceability of global wildlife trade. There is an increasing call for a reform of the HS Code to strengthen monitoring and enforcement of global wildlife trade.

== Reasons for concern ==
Different forms of wildlife trade or use (utilization, hunting, trapping, collection or over-exploitation) are the second major threat to endangered mammals and it also ranks among the first ten threats to birds, amphibians and cycads.

Wildlife trade threatens the local ecosystem, and puts all species under additional pressure at a time when they are facing threats such as over-fishing, pollution, dredging, deforestation and other forms of habitat destruction. In the food chain, species higher up on the ladder ensure that the species below them do not become too abundant (hence controlling the population of those below them). Animals lower on the ladder are often non-carnivorous (but instead herbivorous) and control the abundance of plant species in a region. Due to the very large amounts of species that are removed from the ecosystem, it is not inconceivable that environmental problems will result, similar to e.g. overfishing, which causes an overabundance of jellyfish blooms. Furthermore, research suggests that invasive species are overrepresented in the wildlife trade, and are over 7 times more frequently traded than other species in the global pool. This may be due to a specific preference for invasive species in the trade.

According to the United Nations, World Health Organization and World Wildlife Foundation, the Coronavirus disease 2019 is linked to the destruction of nature, especially to deforestation, habitat loss in general and wildlife trade. The head of the UN convention on biological diversity stated: "We have seen many diseases emerge over the years, such as Zika, Aids, Sars and Ebola, and they all originated from animal populations under conditions of severe environmental pressures."

=== Zoonoses ===
Outbreaks of zoonotic diseases including COVID-19, H5N1 avian flu, severe acute respiratory syndrome (SARS), and monkeypox have been traced to live wildlife markets where the potential for zoonotic transmission is greatly increased. Wildlife markets in China have been implicated in the 2002 SARS outbreak and the COVID-19 pandemic. It is thought that the market environment provided optimal conditions for the coronaviruses of zoonotic origin that caused both outbreaks to mutate and subsequently spread to humans.

Nonetheless, the COVID-19 pandemic declaration – and the subsequent quarantines – led to increased online trade in wildlife. The isolation of quarantine itself immediately became the selling point, with pets as companions and distractions.

== Survival rate of species during transport ==
In some instances, such as the sale of chameleons from Madagascar, organisms are transported by boat or via the air to consumers. The survival rate of these is extremely poor (only 1% survival rate). This is undoubtedly caused by the illegal nature; vendors rather not risk that the chameleons were to be discovered and so do not ship them in plain view. Due to the very low survival rate, it also means that far higher amounts of organisms (in this case chameleons) are taken away from the ecosystem, to make up for the losses.

== Consequences for indigenous peoples ==
In many instances, tribal people have become the victims of the fallout from poaching. With increased demand in the illegal wildlife trade, tribal people are often direct victims of the measures implemented to protect wildlife. Often reliant upon hunting for food, they are prevented from doing so, and are frequently illegally evicted from their lands following the creation of nature reserves aimed to protect animals. Tribal people are often falsely accused of contributing to the decline of species – in the case of India, for example, they bear the brunt of anti-tiger poaching measures, despite the main reason for the tiger population crash in the 20th century being due to hunting by European colonists and Indian elites. In fact, contrary to popular belief, there is strong evidence to show that they effectively regulate and manage animal populations.

== Illegal wildlife trade ==
How wildlife trafficking networks operate.

Interpol has estimated the extent of the illegal wildlife trade between $10 billion and $20 billion per year. While the trade is a global one, with routes extending to every continent, conservationists say the problem is most acute in Southeast Asia. There, trade linkages to key markets in China, the United States, and the European Union; lax law enforcement; weak border controls; and the perception of high profit and low risk contribute to large-scale commercial wildlife trafficking. The ASEAN Wildlife Enforcement Network (ASEAN-WEN), supported by the U.S. Agency for International Development and external funders, is one response to the region's illegal wildlife trade networks. There is no clear relationship between the legality of wildlife trade and its sustainability; a species can be legally traded to extinction but it is also possible for illegal trade to be sustainable

=== Asia ===
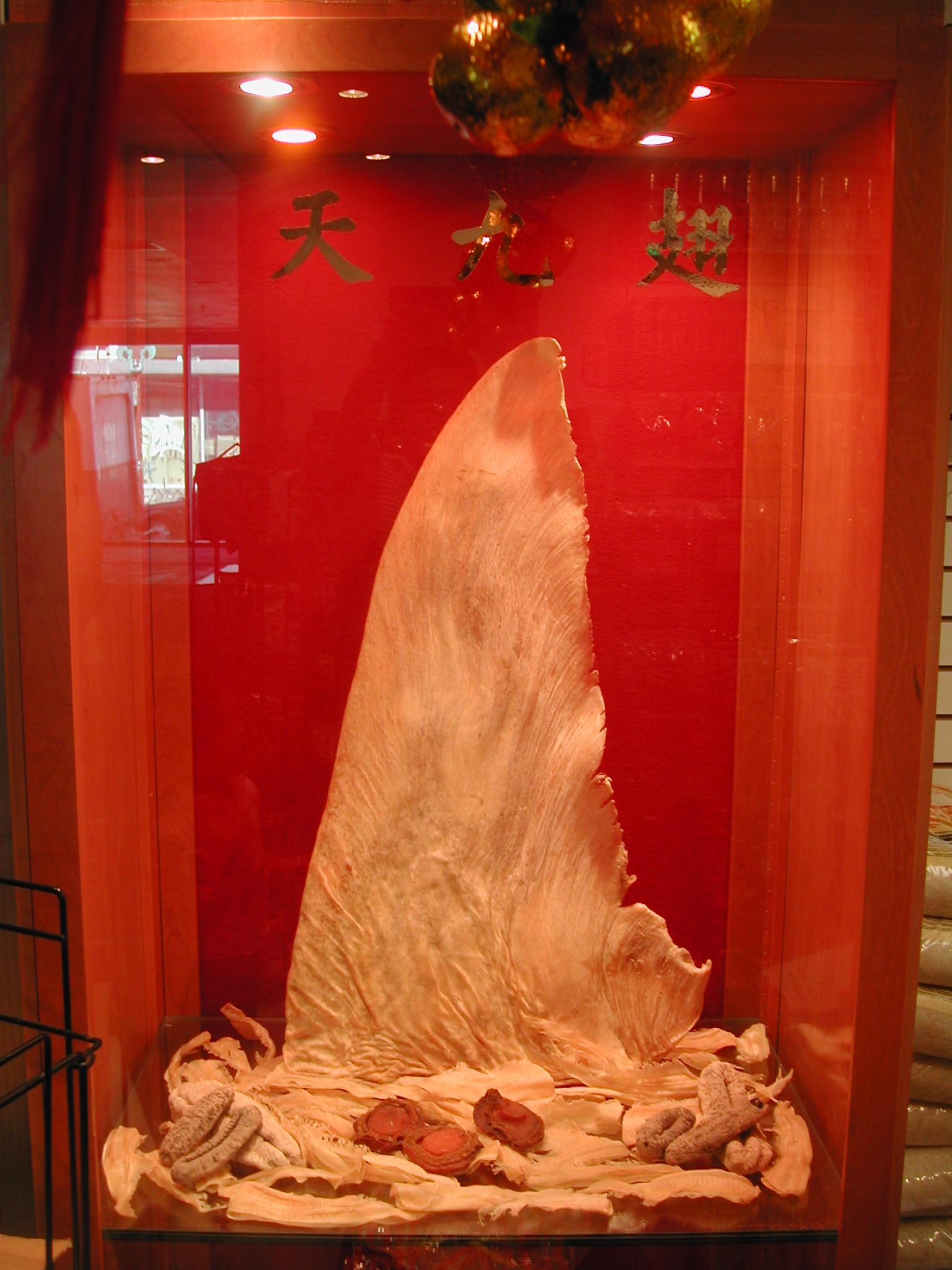
Four sea delicacies for sale in Hong Kong

Notable trade hubs of the wildlife trade include Suvarnabhumi Airport in Bangkok, which offers smugglers direct jet service to Europe, the Middle East, North America and Africa. The Chatuchak weekend market in Bangkok is a known center of illicit wildlife trade, and the sale of lizards, primates, and other endangered species has been widely documented.

Despite international and local laws designed to crack down on the trade, live animals and animal parts, often those of endangered or threatened species, are sold in open-air markets throughout Asia. The trade also includes exotic pets especially birds.

==== India ====
Illegal wildlife trade in India has increased.

According to a report published by the Environmental Investigation Agency (EIA) in 2004, India is the chief target for the traders of wildlife skin. Between 1994 and 2003, there have been 784 cases where the skins of tiger, leopard or otter have been seized. Leopards, rhinoceros, reptiles, birds, insects, rare species of plants are being smuggled into the countries in Southeast Asia and the People's Republic of China. Between 1994 and 2003, poaching and seizure of 698 otters have been documented in India.

Kathmandu is a key staging point for illegal skins smuggled from India bound for Tibet and PRC. The report by EIA noted there has been a lack of cross-border cooperation between India, Nepal and the People's Republic of China to coordinate enforcement operations and lack of political will to treat wildlife crime effectively. The poaching of elephants is a significant problem in Southern India and in the North-Eastern states of Nagaland and Mizoram. In 2015-17, Operation Shikkar led to the arrest of 72 individuals and the seizure of 464 kg of ivory.

The majority of tiger poaching happen in Madhya Pradesh, Uttar Pradesh, Orissa, West Bengal, Assam and Arunachal Pradesh. There was a famous leopard poaching case at Mankulam in Kerala in 2021. Following is a comparison of reported cases of tiger and leopard poaching from 1998 to 2003:

Year	1998	1999	2000	2001	2002	2003
Reported cases of tiger poaching	14	38	39	35	47	8
Reported cases of leopard poaching	28	80	201	69	87	15

Samir Sinha, head of TRAFFIC India, the wildlife trade monitoring arm of the World Wide Fund for Nature (WWF) and the World Conservation Union (IUCN), told Reuters in an interview "The situation regarding the illegal trade in wildlife parts in India is very grim. It is a vast, a varied trade ranging from smuggling of rare medicinal plants to butterflies to peafowl to tigers and it is difficult to predict how big it is, but the threats and dimensions suggest that the trade is increasing".

Project Tiger, a wildlife conservation project, was initiated in 1972 and was launched by Indira Gandhi on 1 April 1973. With 23 tiger reserves, Project Tiger claimed to have succeeded. But according to critics like conservationist Billy Arjan Singh, temporary increases in tiger population were caused by immigration due to destruction of habitat in Nepal, not because of the widely acclaimed success of wildlife policy in India.

=== Africa ===
Many African species are traded both within the country of origin and internationally. Charismatic mega-fauna are among commonly traded species native to the African continent including African elephants, pangolin, rhinoceros, leopards, and lions. Other animals such as vultures play a role in trade, both domestically and internationally. In northern Botswana the number of found elephant carcasses increased approximately six times in the years 2014–2018 and the country legalized elephant hunting in May 2019. At the same time, the elephants began to die from a mysterious disease that possibly presents a danger to humans.

Morocco has been identified as a transit country for wildlife moving from Africa to Europe due to its porous borders with Spain. Wildlife is present in the markets as photo props, sold for decoration, used in medicinal practices, sold as pets and used to decorate shops. Large numbers of reptiles are sold in the markets, especially spur-thighed tortoises. Although leopards have most likely been extirpated from Morocco, their skins can regularly be seen sold openly as medicinal products or decoration in the markets.

=== South America ===
Although the volume of animals traded may be greater in Southeast Asia, animal trade in Latin America is widespread as well.

In open air Amazon markets in Iquitos and Manaus, a variety of rainforest animals are sold openly as meat, such as agoutis, peccaries, turtles, turtle eggs, walking catfish, etc. In addition, many species are sold as pets. The keeping of parrots and monkeys as pets by villagers along the Amazon is commonplace. But the sale of these "companion" animals in open markets is rampant. Capturing the baby tamarins, marmosets, spider monkeys, saki monkeys, in order to sell them, often requires shooting the mother primate out of a treetop with her clinging child; the youngster may or may not survive the fall. The United States is a popular destination for Amazonian rainforest animals. They are smuggled across borders the same way illegal drugs are – in the trunks of cars, in suitcases, in crates disguised as something else.

With the human population increasing, such practices have a serious impact on the future prospects for many threatened species. A report from WWF and the Zoological Society of London in 2024 found that the wildlife populations in Latin America and the Caribbean, including the Amazon, have declined by an average of 94% over the past 48 years. This was the largest decline seen in a region of the world. It was caused by multiple factors including wildlife trafficking, combined with deforestation and other pressures.

In Venezuela more than 400 animal species are involved in subsistence hunting, domestic and international (illegal) trade. These activities are widespread and might overlap in many regions, although they are driven by different markets and target different species.

In Brazil, the wildlife trade has grown over the years, as it is one of the most biodiverse areas in the world. Mammals and amphibians are among the highest traded animals. In recent studies, non-native species of amphibians and mammals were identified in Brazil, with frogs and rodents, respectively, posing the greatest invasion risks. The online trade of amphibians as exotic pets has risen almost six times since 2015.

=== Online ===
Through both deep web (password protected, encrypted) and dark web (special portal browsers) markets, participants can trade and transact illegal substances, including wildlife. However the amount of activity is still negligible compared to the amount on the open or surface web. As stated in an examination of search engine key words relating to wildlife trade in an article published by Conservation Biology, "This negligible level of activity related to the illegal trade of wildlife on the dark web relative to the open and increasing trade on the surface web may indicate a lack of successful enforcement against illegal wildlife trade on the surface web."

A study conducted by the International Fund for Animal Welfare (Ifaw) in 2018 revealed online sales of endangered wildlife (on the list of the global Convention on the International Trade in Endangered Species) was pervasive across Europe. Ivory accounted for almost 20 percent of the items offered.

== Organizations addressing illegal wildlife trade ==
- ASEAN Wildlife Enforcement Network
- Basel Institute on Governance
- Clark R. Bavin National Fish and Wildlife Forensic Laboratory
- Four Paws
- FREELAND Foundation
- International Fund for Animal Welfare
- International Union for Conservation of Nature (IUCN)
- Monitor Conservation Research Society (Monitor)
- South Asia Wildlife Enforcement Network (SAWEN)
- Species Survival Network
- TRAFFIC, the wildlife trade monitoring network
- United for Wildlife
- United Nations Environment Programme (UNEP)
- United Nations Sustainable Development Goal 15
- Wildlife Alliance
- World Wildlife Fund for Nature

== Legal wildlife trade ==
Legal trade of wildlife has occurred for many species for a number of reasons, including commercial trade, pet trade as well as conservation attempts. Whilst most examples of legal trade of wildlife are as a result of large population numbers or pests, there is potential for the use of legal trade to reduce illegal trade threatening many species. Legalizing the trade of species can allow for more regulated harvesting of animals and prevent illegal over-harvesting.

Many environmentalists, scientists, and zoologists around the world are against legalizing pet trade of invasive or introduced species, as their release into the wild, be it intentional or not, could compete with indigenous species, and lead to their endangerment.

=== Examples of successful wildlife trade ===
==== Australia ====
===== Crocodiles =====
Trade of crocodiles in Australia has been largely successful. Saltwater crocodiles (Crocodylus porosus) and freshwater crocodiles (Crocodylus johnstoni) are listed under CITES Appendix II. Commercial harvesting of these crocodiles occurs in Northern Territory, Queensland and Western Australia, including harvesting from wild populations as well as approved captive breeding programs based on quotas set by the Australian government.

===== Kangaroos =====
Kangaroos are currently legally harvested for commercial trade and export in Australia. There are a number of species included in the trade including:

- Red kangaroo (Macropus rufus)
- Eastern grey kangaroo (M. giganteus)
- Western grey kangaroo (M.fuliginosus)
- Common wallaroo (M. robustus)

Harvesting of kangaroos for legal trade does not occur in National Parks and is determined by quotas set by state government departments. Active kangaroo management has gained a commercial value in the trade of kangaroo meat, hides and other products.

==== North America ====
===== Alligator =====
Alligators have been traded commercially in Florida and other American states as part of a management program. The use of legal trade and quotas have allowed management of a species as well as economic incentive for sustaining habitat with greater ecological benefits.

=== Legalising trade for endangered species ===
Legalising the trade of products derived from endangered species is highly controversial. Many researchers have proposed that a well regulated legal market could benefit some endangered species by either flooding the market with products that drive down the price of illegal products, decreasing the incentive to illegally harvest, or by providing revenue that could fund the species's conservation. However, laundering and corruption pose a major obstacle to implementing such policies, as illegal harvesters attempt to disguise illegal product as legal when trade is legalized.

Under the Convention on International Trade of Endangered Species of Wild Fauna and Flora (CITES), species listed under Appendix I are threatened with extinction, and commercial trade in wild-caught specimens, or products derived from them, is prohibited. This rule applies to all species threatened with extinction, except in exceptional circumstances. Commercial trade of endangered species listed under Appendix II and III is not prohibited, although Parties must provide non-detriment finding to show that the species in the wild is not being unsustainably harvested for the purpose of trade. Specimens of Appendix I species that were bred in captivity for commercial purposes are treated as Appendix II. An example of this is captive-bred saltwater crocodiles, with some wild populations listed in Appendix I and others in Appendix II.

== Welfare of animals ==
Many animals are kept for months in markets waiting to be sold. The welfare of animals in trade is almost universally poor, with the vast majority of animals failing to receive even the most basic freedom from pain, hunger, distress, discomfort, and few opportunities to express normal behaviour. Reptiles specifically endure tight living spaces, torn claws and dehydration during capturing and transportation. Sometimes, they are also crushed from being stacked on top of each other.

== See also ==
- Environmental crime
- Ecocide
- Ivory trade
- Poaching
- Wildlife smuggling
- Wildlife farming
- African Vulture trade
- Pangolin trade
- Border control
- Endangered species
