= Freeland Foundation =

International environmental organization

- Founded: Early-2000
- Founder: Steve Galster
- Type: non-governmental not-for-profit organization
- Purpose: Illegal wildlife trade, human trafficking
- Location: Bangkok, Thailand
- Region served: Southeast Asia
- Website: www.freeland.org
- Formerly called: WildAid, PeunPa

The Freeland Foundation (rendered FREELAND Foundation by the foundation) is an international NGO headquartered in Bangkok which works on environmental conservation and human rights in Asia. The organization intends to stop wildlife and human trafficking.

The organization combats the illegal wildlife trade and habitat destruction. Its environmental conservation programs address threats to endangered flora and fauna. This includes poaching and logging in protected areas, smuggling, and the subsequent sale and consumption of wildlife.

With funding from the United States Agency for International Development (USAID), Freeland Foundation provides expertise and support to the Association of Southeast Asian Nations Wildlife Enforcement Network (ASEAN Wildlife Enforcement Network), a regional inter-governmental initiative to combat wildlife smuggling.

== Overall aims ==
Freeland intends to increase wildlife protection, combat illegal wildlife trafficking, and reduce global consumption and demand for endangered species. It combats human slavery and wildlife trafficking by increasing law enforcement capacity, supporting vulnerable communities, and raising awareness.

=== Anti-crime work ===
Freeland provides training and technical assistance to police, customs, and environmental agencies in the ASEAN region to combat poaching, illegal logging, and human trafficking. It cooperates with governmental task forces and facilitates cross-border inter-agency co-operation and civil society action. The organization's trainers are former government enforcement officers.

=== Community work ===
Freeland helps rural communities to develop sustainable and environmentally friendly businesses, such as plant nurseries, fish and mushroom farms. The organization also supports communities to develop renewable energy sources and reforestation projects.

=== Awareness campaigns ===
Freeland's public awareness campaigns focus on the roles that consumer demand and apathy play in wildlife and human trafficking, while also highlighting the threats these crimes pose to natural ecosystems, and global biodiversity. One such campaign is Piece of Responsibility.

== History ==
Freeland Foundation was founded in 2000. It works in partnership with governments, communities, corporations, and other NGOs. It was previously known as WildAid (Thailand) and changed its name to Freeland Foundation in early-2009.

== Programs ==
=== Training ===
Freeland's training programs are in Southeast Asia, aimed at local staff and communities.

Freeland capacity building and support programs include: Protected Area Training Program; the Investigations Training Program; the Border Inspection and Controlled Delivery Program; the Judicial and Prosecutor Awareness Program; and the Poachers to Protectors Alternative Livelihoods Program.

=== Intervention ===
==== Reforestation ====
Freeland works with park authorities, local communities, schools, and private sector partners in reforestation.

==== Alternative livelihoods ====
Freeland's community outreach team encourages villagers to give up illegal poaching and logging activities through a combination of environmental awareness and the development of small-scale environmentally friendly businesses.

=== ASEAN-WEN support program ===
Freeland Foundation, together with TRAFFIC Southeast Asia, implements a USAID-funded support program to the ASEAN Wildlife Enforcement Network (ASEAN-WEN). The support program conducts national assessments, helped set up the structure of ASEAN-WEN and its secretariat (Program Coordination Unit), and provides training and workshops for ASEAN member nations wildlife law enforcement officials, prosecutors, and the judiciary to counter wildlife crime.

== Partners ==
Freeland developed the “Pattaya Manifesto on Combating Wildlife Crime in Asia” in 2009.
