= Traffic (conservation programme) =

International organization for sustainable wildlife trade

TRAFFIC The Wildlife Trade Monitoring Network
- Formation: 1976
- Type: International non-governmental organization
- Location: Cambridge, UK
- Region served: Worldwide
- Products: Traffic Bulletin, Various reports
- Services: Wildlife trade, Conservation
- Key people: John A Burton, first Director; Rick Scobey, current Executive Director
- Employees: ~140 (2019)
- Website: www.traffic.org

TRAFFIC is the leading global non-governmental organization tackling the illegal wildlife trade. Set up in 1976, TRAFFIC acts as advisor and partner to governments, businesses, law enforcement, and communities worldwide addressing the root causes of illegal and unsustainable trade in wild species.

== History ==
=== 1990s ===
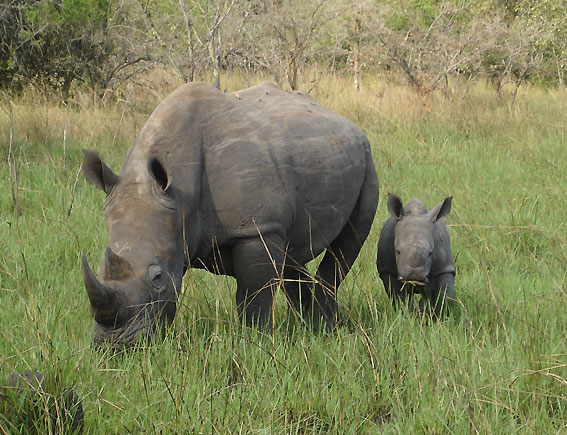
The critically endangered black rhinoceros is a focus of TRAFFIC's conservation efforts

TRAFFIC established 13 more offices worldwide in Europe (1990), East/Southern Africa (1991), and East Asia (1994). The organization focused on trade issues including tiger, agarwood, and rhino, leading to the establishment of The Bad Ivory Database System (BIDS), the foundation for the ETIS (Elephant Trade Information System). TRAFFIC's first major initiative in Africa investigated the decline of the black rhino, which was facing serious threats from poaching and continued horn trafficking. In an effort to track all rhino horn in circulation, TRAFFIC established the Rhino Horn and Product Database. The database provided a valuable source of information for government and private sources to regulate rhino horn trade and has since been expanded to include data from 54 countries.

=== 2000s ===
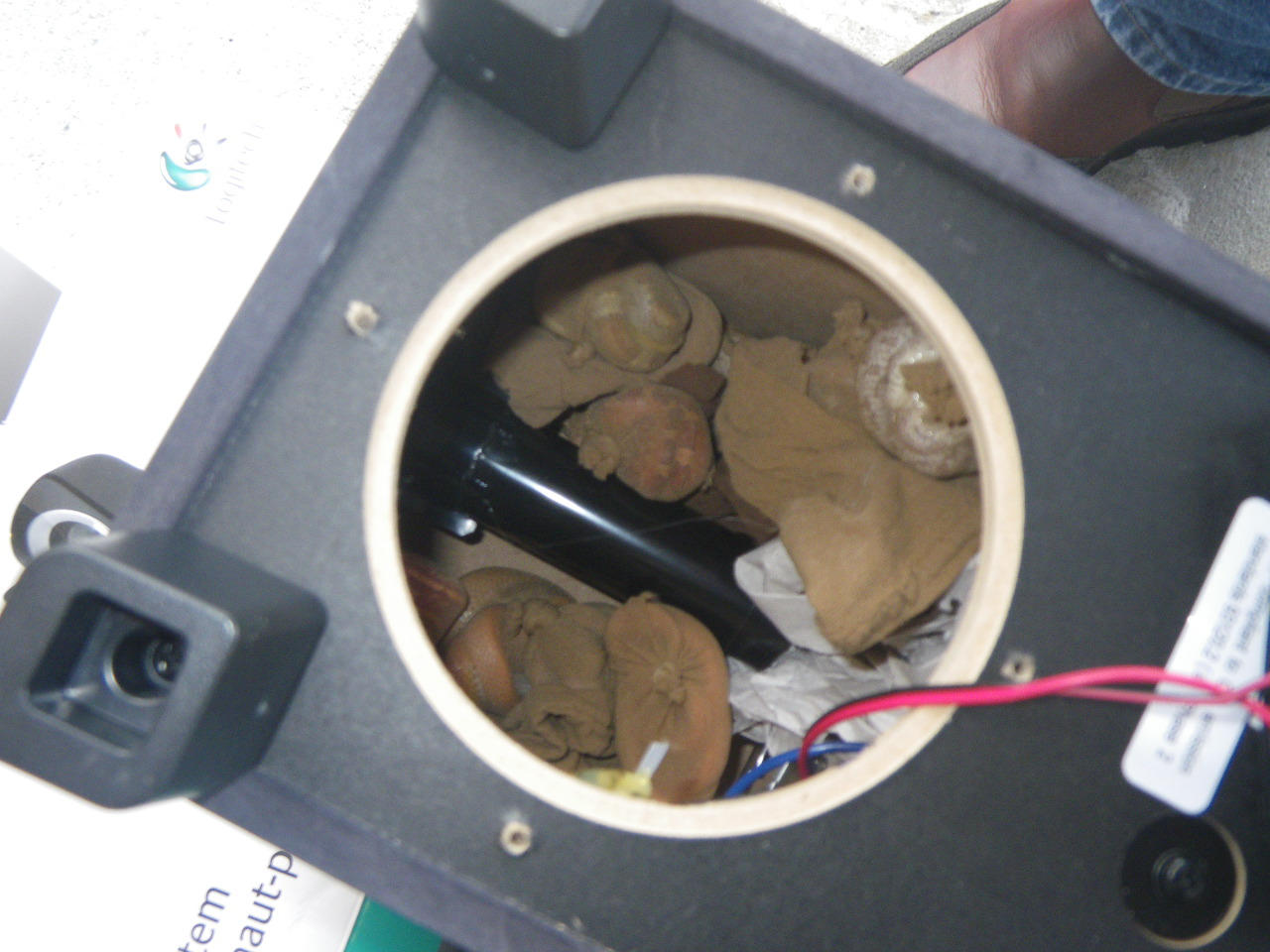
Snakes smuggled in a speaker, the type of animal trafficking TRAFFIC tries to cease

TRAFFIC expanded into what is now referred to the "green stream," an effort to promote sustainable wildlife trade rather than focusing only on unsustainable trade. In 2007, TRAFFIC, the WWF, IUCN, and BfN launched the International Standard for Sustainable Wild Collection of Medicinal and Aromatic Plants (ISSC-MAP) for sustainable wild collection of medicinal and aromatic plants.

=== 2010s ===
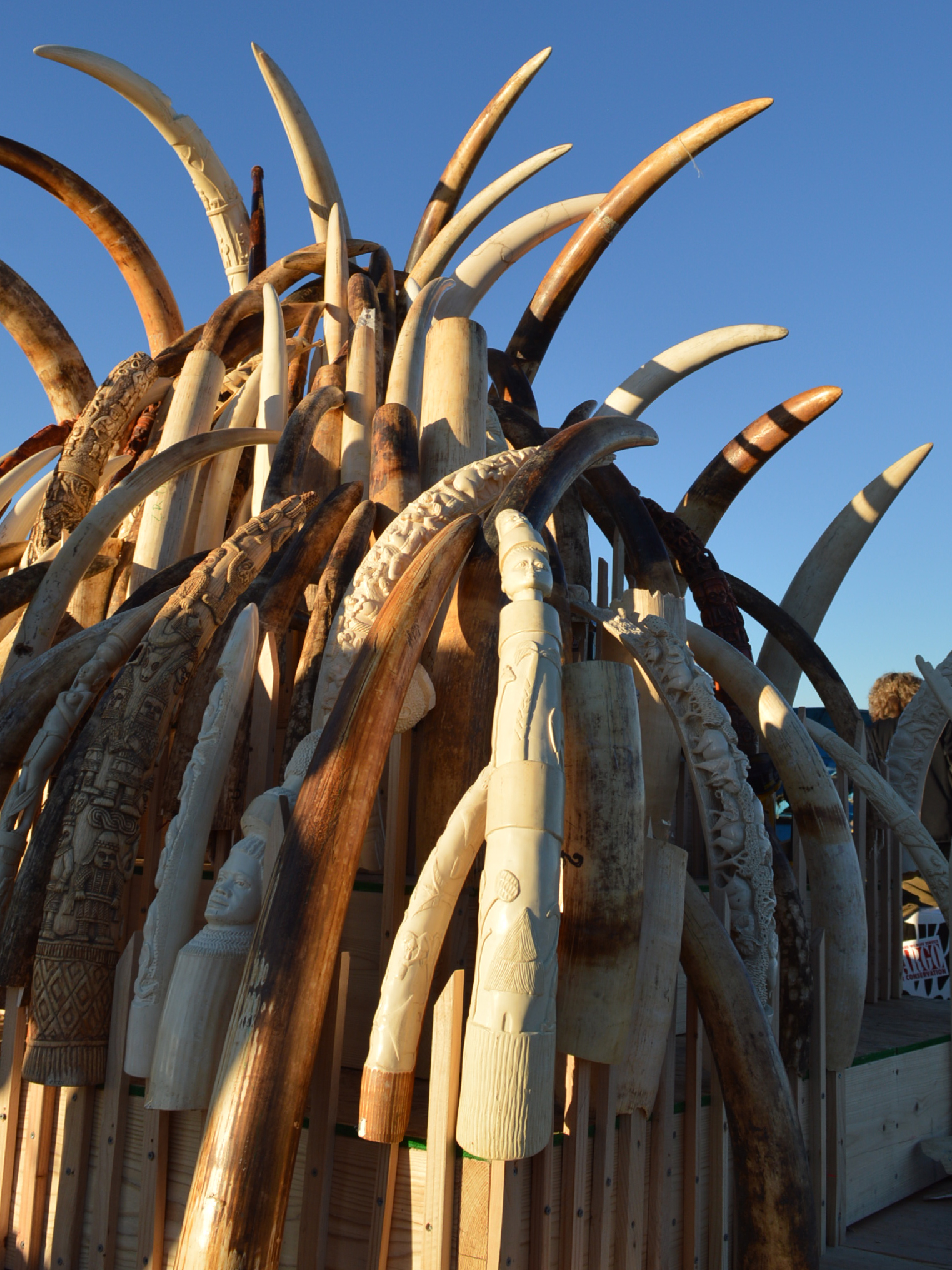
Ivory tower of tusks from poached elephants

TRAFFIC began to incorporate more social and economic responsibility into its work, empowering communities whilst promoting sustainable wildlife trade. In 2011 a project was launched with indigenous women in the Amazon to promote sustainable trade and provide alternative sources of income to the unsustainable harvest of bushmeat. A partnership was established between TRAFFIC, the Association of the Waorani Women of the Ecuadorian Amazon, and the chocolate company WAO Chocolate that won a UNDP award in June 2014.

Post 2010, TRAFFIC began to embrace the concept of making wildlife trade sustainable through behavioral change. In 2014, TRAFFIC helped launch the Chi Initiative in Vietnam, one of the biggest consumers of rhino horn products, to preserve declining rhino populations.

== Achievements ==
=== Bad Ivory Database (BIDS) and Elephant Trade Information System (ETIS), 1992 ===
The Elephant Trade Information system (ETIS) is an information system that tracks illegal trade in ivory and other elephant products. Managed by TRAFFIC on behalf of CITES, it contained nearly 20,000 records from around 100 countries by 2014. ETIS originated from TRAFFIC's BIDS, set up in 1992 to track law enforcement records from ivory seizures or confiscations around the world beginning in 1989.

=== EU-TWIX, 2005 ===
TRAFFIC, the Belgian Federal Police, Belgian Convention on International Trade in Endangered Species of Wild Fauna and Flora Management Authority (CITES MA), and Belgian Customs set up and maintain a wildlife database and information exchange platform known as the EU Trade in Wildlife Information Exchange (EU-TWIX). Operational by 2005, it centralizes data on seizures submitted by EU enforcement agencies, by 2010 holding over 31,000 seizure records and having an active membership of over 500 law enforcement officers from all EU member states.

=== Current programs since 2017 ===
TRAFFIC implemented the USAID funded Wildlife-TRAPS project that operates in Africa and Asia to combat illegal trade between the two continents.

TRAFFIC provided training modules through the ROUTES Partnership.

== Wildlife regulations ==
=== Drafting EU wildlife regulations ===
In 1992, TRAFFIC published "The wild plant trade in Europe: Results of a survey of European nurseries", a major study on plant trade that recommended harmonizing legislation within the EU. TRAFFIC used the study to initiate a project with WWF the following year to work on improving EU wildlife trade regulations, with the new regulations taking effect in 1997.

=== UN Resolution on Protecting Wildlife ===
In 2012, TRAFFIC and the WWF launched a joint global campaign encouraging governments to combat illegal wildlife trade and reduce demand for illicit products from endangered species. The campaign's momentum led to the unprecedented success of the first UN resolution on wildlife crime in 2015.

=== Standard for Sustainable Wild Collection of Medicinal and Aromatic Plants (ISSC-MAP), 2007 ===
Biodiversity around the globe is rapidly declining due to overexploitation, habitat loss, and other threats. Since prehistoric times, the majority of the human population has relied on between 50,000 and 70,000 wild plants for traditional medicine. Today, most medicinal plants are still collected from the wild rather than captive grown, contributing to the crisis. WHO (World Health Organization), WWF, IUCN, and TRAFFIC all worked together to create an international wild plant collection standard for governments and businesses worldwide.

=== Bushmeat, 2000 ===
TRAFFIC drew attention to the unsustainable use of bushmeat in its 2000 study "Food For Thought: the utilization of wild meat in eastern and southern Africa". Its findings, including the fact that the previously taboo species of zebra was being increasingly harvested, led to widespread publicity, including an IUCN report.

== See also ==
- Convention on International Trade in Endangered Species
- Convention on Biological Diversity
- Convention on Migratory Species
- Environmental Investigation Agency
- SACEP
- UNEP-WCMC
- WildAid
- Wildlife Alliance
- International Network for Environmental Compliance and Enforcement (INECE)
