= Wildlife smuggling in southern Africa =

Map of Southern Africa

The wildlife trafficking network in southern Africa involves the illicit extraction, transportation and transaction of wildlife within and across the nations of Botswana, Lesotho, Namibia, South Africa and Eswatini-Swaziland. Involvement in the illegal trading network can be divided into three general roles: poachers, traffickers and intermediaries, and consumers. There are a wide range of motives depending on an individual's role in the network. Some motivations include profit, sustenance, and reducing human-wildlife conflict.

== Wildlife commodities ==
Animals subject to wildlife trafficking include any animal that is not explicitly sanctioned by the government to wound, kill, or export. In the southern region of Africa, some species that are common in the illegal trading network are exotic birds, large African cats, rhinoceros, and elephants.

Threatened exotic bird species are the most exported wildlife from the southern region of Africa. Top importer of exotic birds is South Africa, though there are also buyers in the United States and Europe. The African Gray Parrot (Psittacus erithacus) is the most poached parrot of South Africa.

Large African cats that are poached include lions, cheetahs, and leopards. Body parts of African cats, particularly lions, are traded both pan-nationally and transnationally for zootherapeutic practices. Eighty percent of the African Lion (Panthera leo) population is concentrated in east and southern Africa. Trade of lion skin, teeth, and claws occurs most frequently within the continent. While domestic trade of lion parts is much more common, there is also a significant amount of lion bone trade across East-Southeast Asia.

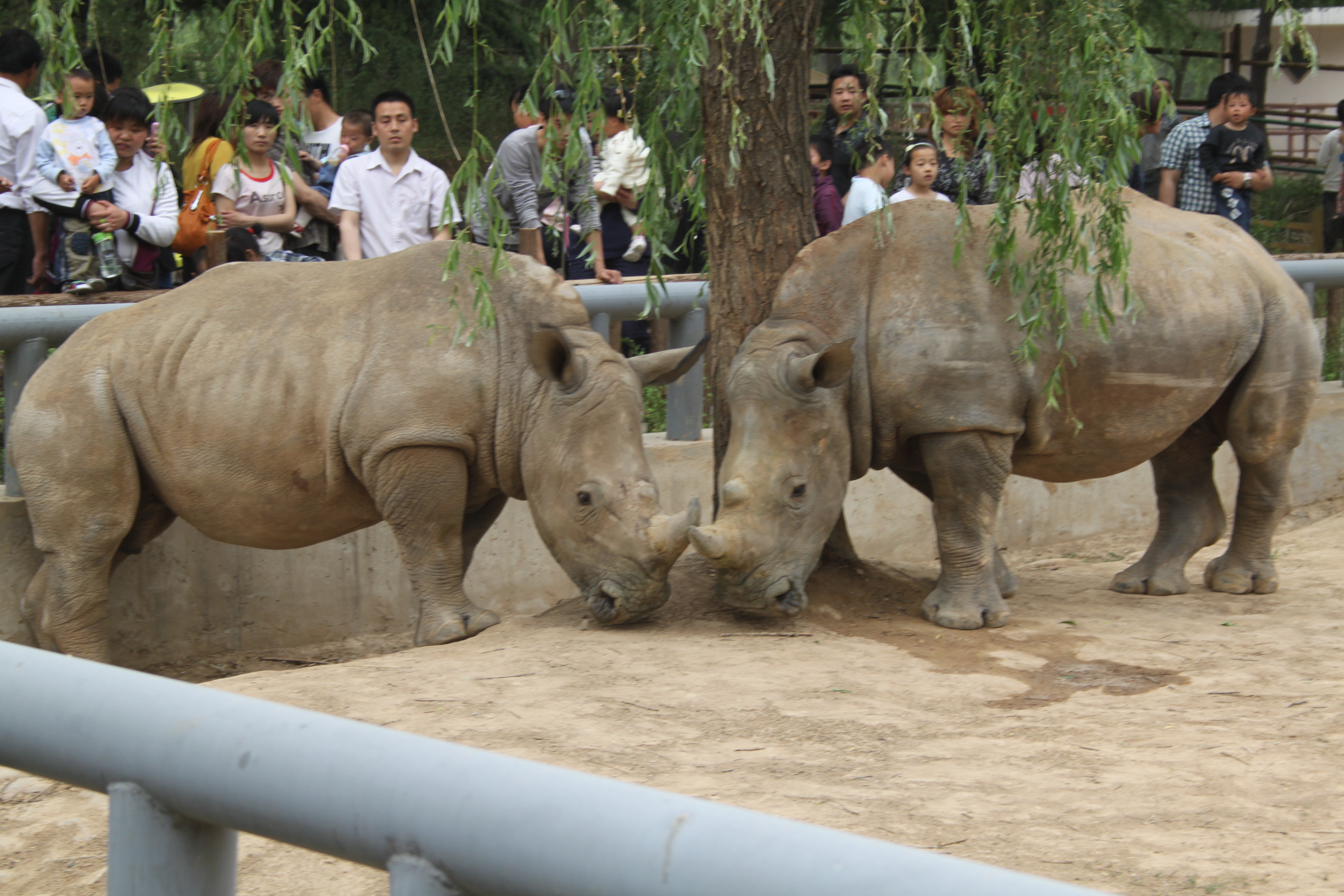
White Rhinoceros in Southern Africa

Elephants and rhinoceros are poached for ivory and rhinoceros horn. The trends of rhinoceros and elephant poaching are largely dependent on global demand. Rhinoceros horns are used for decorative purposes and some Asian medicines. In South Africa, rhino poaching commonly happens on privately owned land, which is difficult for officials to prevent. Another common place to poach is Kruger National Park. The African elephant (Loxodonta africana) is the elephant species that inhabits southern Africa. While elephant populations in Eastern and Central Africa are steadily decreasing, elephant population sizes in southern Africa are stable. The current elephant population in southern Africa is 293, 447. However, poaching continues to threaten the status of elephant populations, specifically in Kruger National Park, where the PIKE (Proportion of Illegally Killed Elephants) value has increased 23% from 2014 to 2015.

== Poachers ==
Poachers function as the suppliers to the wildlife market. Illegal poaching occurs locally and on larger, commercial scales. There are various motivations for poaching, some of which include an aim to reduce human-wildlife conflict, trophy hunting, and consumer demand.

Small-scale poaching may occur to protect domestic animals and crops. Farmers poach predatory animals, such as lions, cheetahs and leopards. Another driver of poaching for locals is inadequate sources of income. Poaching presents a lucrative alternative for people in need. In rural areas in Namibia, a single poached animal can sell for one-hundred USD. Also, one rhinoceros horn can sell for six-hundred USD.

Large-scale poaching is more complex and may include more organized groups. Criminal groups consist of advanced communication systems, automobiles and weapons that facilitate large quantities of killings with minimal detection. Commercial poachers pay individuals who have limited sources for income. The complexity and distance between intermediaries and poachers makes it difficult to identify the source.

== Traffickers and intermediaries ==
Traffickers facilitate the transport of products from the poachers to the consumers. Intermediaries include politicians that are hired to help transport illegal goods across borders. Other intermediaries are people who are unaware of their involvement. Local traders can act as the "middle-man" between poachers and urban exporters.

Wildlife traffickers tend to travel through areas where enforcement is more lenient. Crime syndicates move wildlife commodities through an organized network of people. Transporters hide living and dead wildlife commodities in luggage. Corrupt government officials also play a significant role in the transport of wildlife commodities. The seizures of wildlife poaching is largely undocumented in some areas, such as Tanzania, which suggests there are state workers forging paperwork for unlawful commodities

== Consumers ==
=== African consumers ===
Consumers at the end of the market change can be local or international. African consumers purchase illegal wildlife commodities for pets, medicinal uses, and belief uses. In Namibia and South Africa, the trade of exotic birds and reptiles are popular among consumers as pets. Exotic birds are popular pets because they require minimal maintenance and are low-cost. Local collectors display exotic pets to reel in tourists and accrue revenue.

Belief uses of illegal wildlife commodities vary by region. For example, leopard paws are sold in South Africa to fight against bad luck. Pangolins are prevalent in Central, East, and Southern Africa, and have a variety of uses that are specific to different areas. African Vulture trade also occurs throughout the southern region of Africa, as vulture bushmeat has medicinal and belief uses.

=== Global consumers ===
According to the CITES database, most international wildlife exports from Africa go to Europe, Japan and the United States. The buyer are pet shops, private collectors, animal brokers, game farms, biomedical labs, circuses, exotic meat dealers. International consumers purchase illegal wildlife products for medicinal uses, pets, or status symbols.

== Responses ==
There is a wide range of government enforcement and regulation to combat illegal wildlife trafficking. In South Africa and Namibia regulation is a prominent force to defend against illegal trade. The penalties for unauthorized poaching can result in prison sentences of fines. Also, the Trade in Wildlife Information Exchange (TWIX) was implemented for the Southern Africa Development Community (SADF) in 2019 to enforce wildlife trade regulation and increase communication about illicit trade of wildlife in the southern region of Africa.

Organizations such as CITES and TRAFFIC work to track the illegal trafficking of wildlife commodities, identify the animals that are most at risk, and promote the conservation of wildlife. There are also initiatives to increase local community participation in wildlife conservation. The Integrated Rural Resource Development Project in Zambia ( IRRDP) puts local people in charge of protecting wildlife.

== See also ==
- Illegal fishing in Africa

== General references ==
- Duffy, Rosaleen, and Jasper Humphreys. "Mapping donors: key areas for tackling illegal wildlife trade (Africa and Asia)." (2014).
- Broad, Steven, Teresa Mulliken, and Dilys Roe. "The nature and extent of legal and illegal trade in wildlife." The trade in wildlife: regulation for conservation (2003): 3-22.
- Sinovas, P., et al. Southern Africa's wildlife trade: an analysis of CITES trade in SADC countries. Technical report prepared for the South African National Biodiversity Institute (SANBI). UNEP-WCMC, Cambridge, UK, 2016.
