= ECPP =

ECPP may refer to:

- Elliptic curve primality proving
- Environmental Crime Prevention Program
- European Christian Political Party
