= Wildlife smuggling =

Illegal gathering, transport, and distribution of wildlife

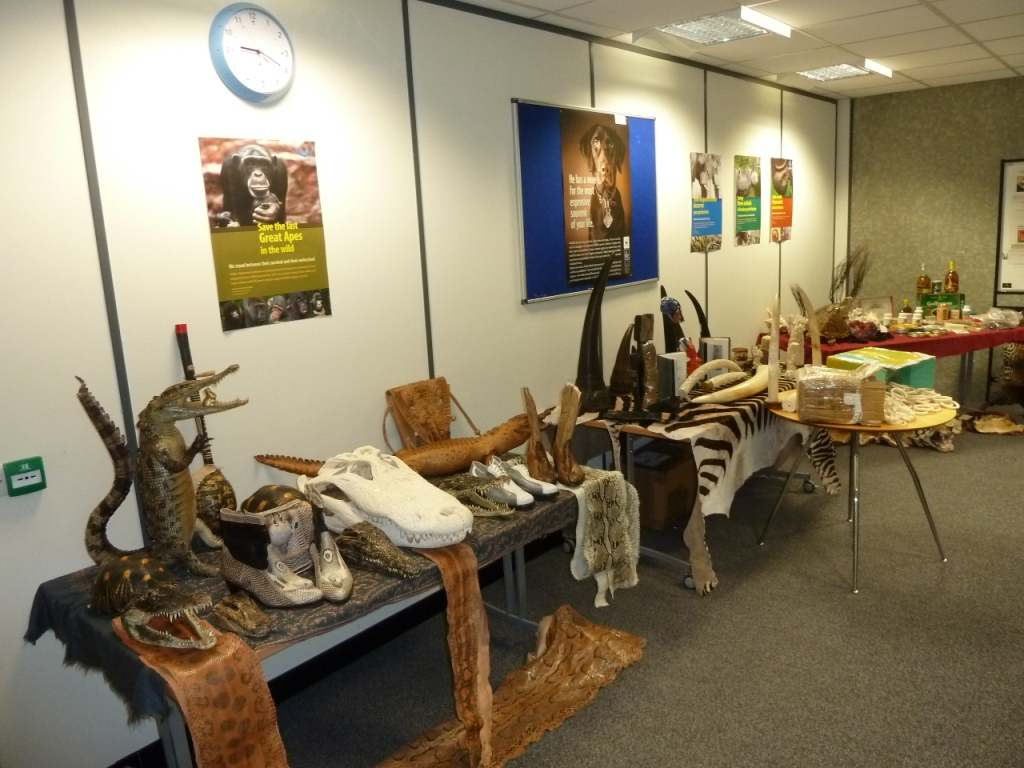
A confiscation room display of illegal wildlife items seized by British Border Force in 2013

Wildlife smuggling, or wildlife trafficking, concerns the illegal gathering and trade of endangered species and protected wildlife, including plants and byproducts or products utilizing a species. Research on wildlife smuggling has increased, however, knowledge of the illicit trade remains limited. The differences between international policies and tendencies likely contribute to the extensive estimated range of wildlife smuggling, anywhere from $5-$23 billion, with an additional $67-$193 billion when timber and fish are included. The prolific growth of wildlife smuggling makes it the fourth-largest criminal enterprise globally after drug, firearm, and human trafficking. Products demanded by the trade include but are not limited to ivory, bushmeat, traditional medicine, and exotic pets. China and the United States are the largest buyers in the illegal wildlife trade. It often involves other illegal activities such as tranquilizing animals without proper authorization.

== Culture ==
In many instances, culture is a driving factor in wildlife trafficking. There are often traditional roots or societal trends behind the reasons specific wildlife faces a greater risk of targeting when it comes to traditional medicines, jewelry, trinkets, pets, and the consumption of wild meat (bushmeat). With the help of globalization, the Internet, social media, and people moving from one nation to another over the centuries, many items desired by the wildlife trade are distributed multi-nationally, such as traditional medicines which appear in the United States, Canada, New Zealand, and South Africa. Laws prohibiting the use of particular plant or animal-derived items fall short when people believe they encroach on traditional cultural values or what they believe is best for human life. Additionally, tourism has accounted for some accidental wildlife trafficking. A person may purchase an item not knowing it is prohibited or banned internationally.

Below are some examples of culturally influenced illegal wildlife trade by various continents and their countries or regions:

=== Asian culture ===
==== China culture ====
The use of Traditional Chinese medicine (TCM) began during the 10th century BCE. Utilizing a variety of plants and animals, TCM was considered the key to treating disease and mitigating the effects of aging. Around 200 years after discovering the germ theory of disease, TCM began to receive pushback from younger, educated crowds. Despite the pushback, TCM remains an essential aspect of cultural identity for many in the Chinese nation, bringing $10 million into the economy in 2005.

Using animal derivatives for traditional medicines has been considered a key driver for the global wildlife trafficking trade. Many commonly used species are now listed as threatened or endangered by the IUCN, with other species showing declines in their populations.

A study sought insights into China's millennial population's attitude towards consuming wildlife products for medicinal purposes. Of the 350 students surveyed by Chinese university students, three-quarters of respondents had yet to try any wildlife products, and only 11% of those respondents stated interest in trying them in the future. Chinese culture historically held a utilitarian view of nature. Still, with societal and cultural shifts, this may begin to change with China's youth.

=== African culture ===
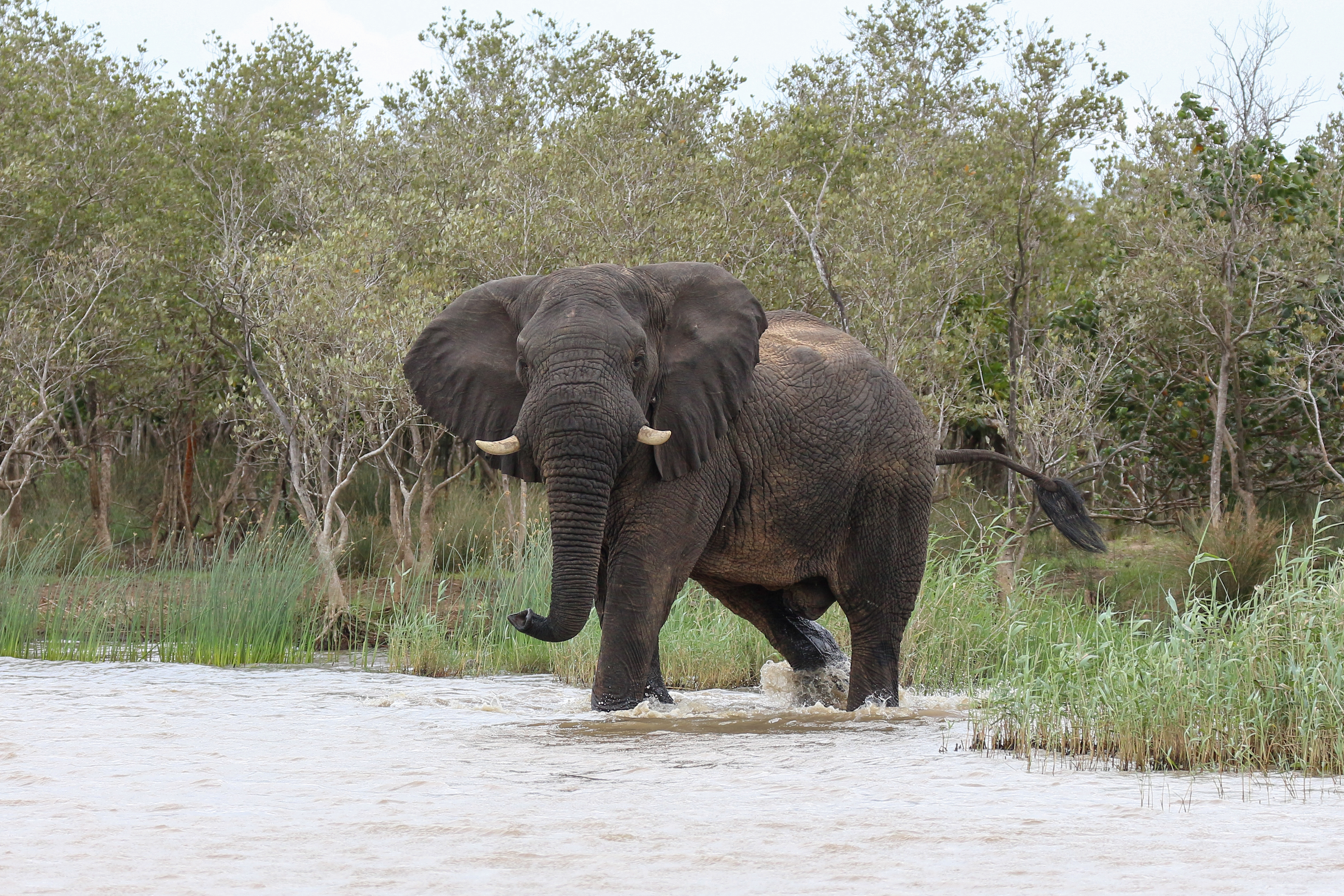
African elephants have experienced drastic reduction in population numbers due to the trafficking of ivory

Although understudied, wild meat is sourced illegally, often due to political and economic instability in African nations. In rural areas, bushmeat is often used as a way to survive poverty and a lack of food security. In contrast, urban residents typically eat bushmeat for the status it brings as a luxury item. Additionally, wild meat is exported from Africa for international markets every year.

Ivory continues to be in great demand for international markets as well, with an estimated 100 African elephants killed daily for their tusks.

== Ineffective monitoring of international wildlife trade ==
The volume of international trade in wildlife commodities is immense and continue to rise. According to an analysis to the 2012 Harmonized System customs statistics, global import of wildlife products amounted to US$187 billion, of which fisheries commodities accounted for $113 billion; plants and forestries for $71 billion; non-fishery animal for $3 billion.

However, the global trade of wildlife commodities is ineffectively monitored and accounted for due to the constraint of the current HS Code System used by the customs worldwide. Majority of international imports of wildlife are only recorded in general categories such as plant or animal products with no further taxonomic detail (this is like importing metals without recording their element identity e.g. copper or iron). It is estimated that near 50% of the global import of plant and 70% of animals product are imported as general categories, with an exception for fisheries (ca. 5%) thanks to various multilateral fishery management agreements that requires taxon-specific fish catch reporting. Furthermore, some frequently traded taxonomic groups including amphibian and live coral are not accounted for at all due to the absence of HS code.

Many jurisdictions relies on the declared HS Code of the consignments for detection and prosecution of illegal wildlife import. The lack of specificity of HS code precludes effective monitoring and traceability of global wildlife trade. There is an increasing call for a reform of the Harmonized System to strengthen monitoring and enforcement of global wildlife trade.

== Impact ==
=== Economic ===
Members of terrorist organizations and criminal organizations illicitly traffic in hundreds of millions of plants and animals to fund the purchase of weapons, finance civil conflicts, and launder money from illicit sources. These often transnational efforts require a funding and a network of poachers, processors, smugglers, sellers, and buyers. Well armed, highly organized poaching activities, such as the murderous 2012 attacks in Chad and the Republic of Congo, have captured headlines. The appeal, in part, is the low risk of detection and punishment compared to drug trafficking. In addition, trafficking can reap significant profits for those leading such efforts. For example, a single Ploughshare tortoise from Madagascar (there are only 400 estimated left in the wild) can fetch US$24,000.

Elephant ivory, a commonly trafficked contraband, can sell for little in the source country and can fetch high prices in destination countries. Prices depend greatly on the source country and the product. Ivory prices and demand have skyrocketed, making it a growing and very lucrative market. Globally, the illegal ivory trade activity in 2014 has more than doubled what it was in 2007. China is the largest importer of illegal ivory; the United States is second. According to reports from wildlife organization Save the Elephants, the price for raw ivory in China was $2,100 per kilogram. Between 2010 and 2012, up to 33,000 elephants were poached and killed on average each year. Wildlife smuggling presents an economic cost to the countries where it occurs, including lost tourism and development opportunities.

=== Health ===
The spread of animal-borne disease affects both human health as well as threatening indigenous wildlife and natural ecosystems. According to the United States Government Accountability Office, nearly 75% of emerging diseases that reach humans come from animals. The link between wildlife trafficking and disease outbreak is questioned, although outbreaks of certain diseases have suspected links to smuggled animals.

==== Diseases believed to have originated and spread by wildlife smuggling ====
- SARS (severe acute respiratory syndrome) is caused by a virus and infects both humans and wildlife. Experts suspect that the SARS virus originated in the China due to contact between a civet (wildcats common in Chinese trade) and humans.
- Avian flu (H5N1) is caused by a highly pathogenic virus. It can infect humans through contact with infected crested hawks and other wild birds, but can be transmitted by contact with poultry as well.
- Monkeypox is an infectious disease found in Africa's wildlife that can spread to humans.
- Ebola Virus is a rare infectious disease that is transmitted from wild animals (chimpanzees, monkeys, gorillas, fruit bats, etc.) to human populations. The transmission of the virus usually occurs through consuming the infected animals, close quarters, or bodily liquid contact.

==== Diseases linked to animal species that are targets of wildlife smuggling ====
- Herpes B virus is a virus found among macaque monkeys that can be transmitted by bites or scratches to humans in extremely rare cases. If not treated soon after exposure, severe brain damage or death can follow infection.
- Salmonella infection can cause diarrhea, fever, and abdominal cramps. Infections have been linked to contact with turtles, bearded dragons and other reptiles.

=== Environmental ===
Wildlife smuggling directly affects the biodiversity of different ecosystems. Certain animals are in higher demand by smugglers, leading to a visible decline of these species in their native habitats. Wildlife smuggling may also cause the introduction of invasive and harmful species into an ecosystem, which can endanger indigenous wildlife by putting a strain on the environment's resources through interspecific competition between species. Throughout the last hundred years, around twenty animals are extinct due to poaching and illegal smuggling, such as the West African Black Rhinoceros, Pyrenean Ibex, and the Passenger Pigeon.

== International control measures ==
How wildlife trafficking networks operate.

Increasingly interconnected globalization increases international trade in a wide variety of products, extending even to exotic animal products. Traders and consumers who still participate in the international exotic animal market ignore the detrimental effects of depleting our environment and ecosystem and instead give priority to individual consumer benefits, such as monetary gains or high fashion. Some people and groups have realized these choices cannot be sustained or tolerated.

Many species are not protected until they are endangered, this delay in protection results in significant losses of biodiversity in the ecosystem. Legislation, such as the Endangered Species Act (ESA), serves to regulate human environmental intervention on the international scale to protect and preserve “species of fish, wildlife, and plants (that) have been so depleted in numbers that they are in danger of or threatened with extinction” and their habitats and to hold those in violation of it accountable. As the international community increases efforts in monitoring and controlling environmental damage, the United Nations aims to create more protected habitats and ecosystems through initiative like the Sustainable Development Goal 15.

Wildlife trafficking is a rising international crisis that is not only taking away animal rights but also threatening the world on global environmental, social, and economic levels. It's contributing to an illegal economy and having detrimental effects on humans’ well-being. The Endangered Species Act (ESA) works along with international treaties like Convention on Migratory Species (CMS) and Convention on International Trade in Endangered Species of Wild Fauna and Flora (CITES), aiming to combat transnational crimes and make joint efforts for wildlife protection. The penalties as a result of breaking these laws are fines as small as $500 per violation and as large as $25,000 per violation or imprisonment up to 6 months. These laws are weakened by these limited penalties and extensive exceptions. These exceptions include “scientific purposes or to enhance the propagation or survival of the affected species…, undue economic hardships…, and Pre-Act endangered species parts exemption; application and certification; regulation; validity of sales contract; separability; renewal of exemption; expiration of renewal certification.”

=== Coalition Against Wildlife Trafficking ===
The Coalition Against Wildlife Trafficking (CAWT) was established in 2005 by the U.S. State Department as a voluntary coalition of governments and organizations that aims to end the illegal trade of wildlife and wildlife products. CAWT currently includes six governments and thirteen international NGOs. Their means of action include raising public awareness to curb demand, strengthening international cross-border law enforcement to limit supply, and endeavoring to mobilize political support from upper echelons.

=== Association of Southeast Asian Nations Wild Enforcement Network ===
The Freeland Foundation and TRAFFIC Southeast Asia worked with the Thai government and the Association of Southeast Asian Nations (ASEAN), to establish the ASEAN Wildlife Enforcement Network (ASEAN-WEN) in 2005. ASEAN-WEN oversees cross-border cooperation and aims to strengthen the collective law enforcement capacity of the ten ASEAN member countries. It is the largest regional wildlife law enforcement collaboration in the world and receives support from the United States Agency for International Development.

=== South Asian Enforcement Network ===
The South Asian Enforcement Network (SAWEN) was created with the help of CAWT and TRAFFIC. In 2008, South Asian environment ministers agreed to create SAWEN under the support of the South Asia Co-operative Environment Programme. The SAWEN countries include Afghanistan, Bangladesh, Bhutan, India, Maldives, Nepal, Pakistan and Sri Lanka.

==== Convention on International Trade in Endangered Species ====
The Convention on International Trade in Endangered Species of Wild Fauna and Flora (CITES) directs its efforts at the supply side of wildlife smuggling. It aims to end wildlife smuggling and to ensure that international trade does not threaten endangered species. For example, Vicuna, the smallest member of the camelid family, was endangered because it was massively hunted for its wool. But after the Vicunas were under the protection of CITES, their numbers increased to reach 350,000 by 2008.

== By region ==
=== Asia ===
Wildlife smuggling hubs in Asia include:

| Country | Hubs |
|---|---|
| Myanmar | Mong La, Tachileik, Kyaikto, Three Pagodas Pass, Muse |
| Laos | Vientiane |
| Cambodia | Preah Monivong National Park, Phnom Penh |
| Vietnam | Pù Mát National Park , Tam Đảo National Park, Hanoi, Haiphong, Vĩnh Yên |
| Thailand | Bangkok's Chatuchak wildlife market, Mae Sai |
| Malaysia | Kuala Lumpur |
| Singapore | Singapore |
| Indonesia | Lubuklinggau, Borneo |
| India | Kaziranga National Park, Panna National Park |
| China | Dalou, Yunnan, Jiegao, Ruili, Xishuangbanna, Kunming, Nanning, Pingxiang, Dongxing, Haikou, Guangzhou (especially Chatou Wild Animal market, Qing ping Market, Panjiayuan Market), Guangdong, Xining, Germu, Linxia City (especially Bei Da Jie market), Beijing, Shanghai, Hong Kong, Lhasa |

In Cambodia, U.S. prosecutors unsealed an indictment in 2022 alleging a scheme to export wild-caught crab-eating macaques as captive-bred for biomedical research using CITES documentation, drawing international scrutiny of permitting and oversight (see Cambodian crab-eating macaque export controversy).

=== Australia ===
International trade of Australia's wildlife is regulated under Part 13A of the Environment Protection and Biodiversity Conservation Act 1999. The same act implements provisions of CITES and the UN Biodiversity Convention in relation to imports of threatened biodiversity and wildlife.

=== Ecuador ===
Latin America is vulnerable to wildlife smuggling because of its biodiversity. Ecuador is known for its biodiversity. In northern Ecuador, the Yasuní National Park and the surrounding Waorani Ethnic Reserve, which cover about 1,770 square miles, are home to around 4,000 species of plants; numerous animals, including the giant river otter; more than 400 fish species; and more than 500 species of birds. As a comparison, the United States is home to 900 species of birds. Commonly smuggled birds include the scarlet macaw; this colorful bird, with bright red, brilliant blue, yellow, and white feathers, is in high demand as a pet. Animals stolen in Latin America often end up in Europe, the United States, or Japan. Though there are laws against wildlife smuggling, the lack of resources causes conservation to be low in priority.

=== Mexico ===
China has become involved in wildlife trafficking, another aspect of its illegal activities in Mexico that include involvement in drug trafficking and other organized crime.

=== United States ===
The Lacey Act of 1900 is a U.S. federal law that prohibits trade in wildlife, fish, and plants that have been illegally taken, possessed, transported, or sold, including endangered species. In 2022, the Big Cat Public Safety Act was enacted, requiring licenses to keep large exotic cats such as lions and tigers and banning cub petting, a lucrative enterprise that incentivized an illegal underground endangered animal trade publicized by the popular documentary miniseries Tiger King.

== See also ==
- CITES – Convention on International Trade in Endangered Species
- Environmental crime
- IUCN Red List – International Union for the Conservation of Nature, list of threatened species
- Poaching
- Wildlife conservation
- Wildlife management
- Wildlife farming
- Wildlife trade
- Wildlife smuggling in southern Africa
- Endangered species
