= Cambodian crab-eating macaque export controversy =

Controversy involving exports of crab-eating macaques from Cambodia

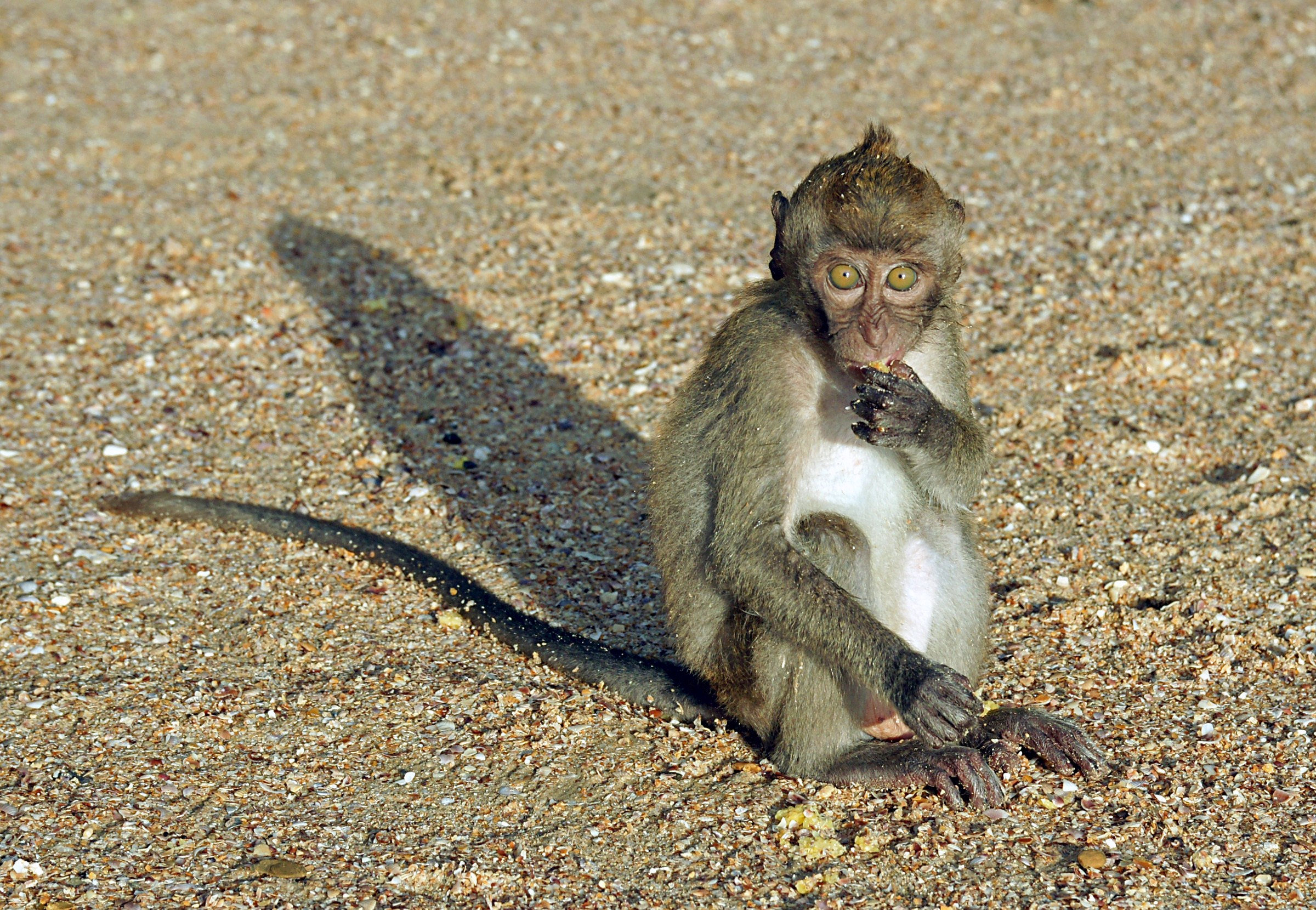
- A Crab-eating macaque (Macaca fascicularis)
- Date: 2022–present (public investigations and international scrutiny)
- Location: Cambodia; United States (imports, investigations, and prosecutions)
- Type: Wildlife-trade controversy; alleged wildlife smuggling and false records
- Participants: Cambodian exporters and officials; overseas brokers; importing companies; U.S. and international authorities

Cambodian crab-eating macaque export controversy refers to a series of allegations and investigations concerning exports of crab-eating macaques (Macaca fascicularis, also known as the long-tailed macaque) from Cambodia for biomedical research and related testing. The controversy centred on allegations that wild-caught macaques were being exported using documentation describing them as captive-bred, and that Cambodian officials connected to wildlife administration and the country's CITES permitting and oversight processes enabled exports through permits and supporting records.

In November 2022, U.S. prosecutors unsealed an indictment charging eight defendants, including Cambodian Forestry Administration officials Masphal Kry and Keo Omaliss. Kry was arrested at John F. Kennedy International Airport while travelling to represent Cambodia at the 2022 CITES Conference of the Parties meeting in Panama.

The U.S. case was linked in the indictment and subsequent reporting to Vanny Bio Research, a Hong Kong–linked biomedical firm with breeding facilities in Cambodia. U.S. authorities alleged that as many as 3,000 wild macaques were laundered through Vanny Bio Research facilities in Cambodia since at least December 2017 and exported with documents falsely listing the animals as captive-bred.

The controversy emerged amid tighter global supply and higher prices for research macaques after export restrictions from China and increased demand during the COVID-19 pandemic.

== Background and regulation ==
Crab-eating macaques are widely used in biomedical and pharmaceutical research and testing. During the COVID-19 era, research demand increased while supply tightened, contributing to higher prices and increased scrutiny of sourcing claims and trade records for macaques used in research.

International commercial trade in crab-eating macaques is regulated under CITES, which requires export permits and related controls for listed species. In the U.S. indictment unsealed in November 2022, prosecutors described CITES permits and source codes as documentation used to indicate whether animals are captive-bred or wild-caught and to support monitoring of legal international trade.

Vanny Bio Research began operating in Cambodia in 2002 and expanded its facilities in subsequent years; it has been described as one of at least six macaque breeding facilities operating in the country. Cambodia banned the capture of wild monkeys for sale in 2010, but concerns about illegal capture and laundering into trade continued to be raised amid high demand and reported governance and enforcement weaknesses.

Cambodia's macaque exports increased substantially in the late 2010s and early 2020s, including 13,922 exported in 2019 and 29,466 in 2020.

In some procurement contexts, buyers prefer or require animals represented as captive-bred (including second-generation captive-bred animals often described as "F2"), which can create incentives for documentation to support captive-breeding claims rather than wild capture.

== Allegations and U.S. legal proceedings ==
According to allegations summarised in the U.S. Department of Justice announcement, the November 2022 indictment charged eight defendants with conspiracy and smuggling-related offences in connection with alleged imports of wild-caught macaques into the United States under false records describing them as captive-bred animals.

The defendants were identified in coverage as including Cambodian Forestry Administration officials Masphal Kry and Keo Omaliss and individuals associated with Vanny Bio Research and Hong Kong–headquartered Vanny Resources Holdings, including James Man Sang Lau, Dickson Lau, Sunny Chan, Sarah Yeung, Hing Ip Chung and Raphael Cheung Man. The charges included one count of conspiracy and seven counts of smuggling under U.S. wildlife laws, and the defendants faced potential prison sentences if convicted.

The DOJ announcement alleged that wild macaques were acquired in Cambodia and laundered through a breeding facility for export, with shipments supported by export documentation that misrepresented the macaques as captive-bred. The DOJ statement also alleged that the scheme relied on the involvement of Cambodian officials connected to the country's CITES authority and the Ministry of Agriculture, Forestry and Fisheries.

The DOJ announcement stated that Masphal Kry was arrested at John F. Kennedy International Airport in New York on 16 November 2022, and the indictment was unsealed following his arrest. Subsequent reporting described him as travelling to represent Cambodia at the 2022 CITES Conference of the Parties meeting in Panama when he entered the United States and was arrested.

== Cambodian government response and international scrutiny ==
After the U.S. case became public, Cambodian authorities rejected allegations that wild macaques were being smuggled or falsely documented for export and stated that legal procedures and international requirements were being followed.

In a statement reported by Mongabay, Cambodia's Ministry of Agriculture, Forestry and Fisheries said it was "surprised and saddened" by Masphal Kry's detention and stated that it adhered to CITES rules; it also denied that macaques exported to the United States were taken from the wild, saying that breeding for export had been taking place in Cambodia since 2005.

The trade had faced earlier controversy, including claims made by the British Union for the Abolition of Vivisection in 2008 about sourcing and animal-welfare conditions at Vanny Bio Research and later reports of wild macaques being captured and laundered into trade flows despite formal restrictions. In a 2016 interview with Khmer Times, Omaliss said that capturing wild macaques to sell as captive-bred animals was illegal.

In February 2025, a proposed trade suspension for Cambodian macaque exports was discussed at a CITES Standing Committee meeting in Geneva. The committee did not adopt an immediate suspension and instead gave Cambodian authorities until November 2025 to host inspections, produce logbooks and submit additional data; the issue was to be reviewed at the 2025 CITES Conference of the Parties (COP20) in Uzbekistan.

At the meeting, Cambodian officials disputed claims that birth rates at breeding facilities were unrealistic and objected to the use of data obtained during U.S. investigations, while a number of macaque-importing countries supported continued trade pending further review. Conservation groups and animal-rights organizations criticised the decision and argued that continued exports risked further pressure on wild populations through poaching, habitat loss and other threats.

CITES Standing Committee documents in 2025 also addressed follow-up and technical review related to Cambodia's trade in Macaca fascicularis, including a technical verification and assessment mission concerning the trade.

== See also ==
- Crab-eating macaque
- Convention on International Trade in Endangered Species of Wild Fauna and Flora
- Wildlife trade
- Wildlife trafficking
- Wildlife smuggling
