= Wildlife Enforcement Monitoring System =

Environmental governance and wildlife crime information-sharing system

The Wildlife Enforcement Monitoring System (WEMS) is an environmental governance and information-sharing system designed to support the monitoring of wildlife crime, illegal wildlife trade, and enforcement of wildlife-related legislation. It uses geographic information system (GIS) technology together with spatial and non-spatial information to facilitate the collection, analysis, and sharing of information relevant to wildlife law enforcement and compliance with multilateral environmental agreements (MEAs).

Presentation of the Wildlife Enforcement Monitoring System (WEMS) at CITES CoP14, The Hague, Netherlands, presided over by Peter Pueschel (IFAW), Peter Younger (INTERPOL), Dr Remi Chandran (United Nations University) and Dr R. B. Lal, Director General of Wildlife, Ministry of Environment, Government of India.

WEMS was initially developed in the context of challenges associated with the flow of enforcement information between national institutions and international organisations involved in the implementation of MEAs, including the Convention on International Trade in Endangered Species of Wild Fauna and Flora (CITES). The system was designed to provide an information technology framework through which information could move from local and national levels towards organisations involved in monitoring enforcement and compliance.

The development of WEMS has involved researchers, government agencies, United Nations organisations, wildlife enforcement institutions, and other stakeholders. The initiative has subsequently been associated with research into transboundary information sharing, environmental governance, and the use of digital technologies in wildlife law enforcement.

== Purpose and functions ==
The original concept for WEMS was to address gaps in the collection, management, and exchange of information concerning wildlife crime and the enforcement of environmental agreements. The system was designed to integrate spatial and non-spatial information and to support the analysis of wildlife crime incidents at different geographic and administrative levels.

The first WEMS prototype included an interactive map and functions for examining the geographical and temporal distribution of wildlife crime information. The system was also designed to support the analysis of potential routes associated with illegal wildlife trade and to generate structured information based on wildlife crime incidents.

The WEMS concept subsequently evolved towards a model in which governments and national enforcement agencies retained responsibility for enforcement information while selected information could be shared with regional and international bodies. This reflected concerns about data ownership, institutional mandates, confidentiality, and the political and organisational barriers associated with transboundary information sharing.

The system was therefore conceived not only as a technological platform but also as an institutional and governance framework for improving the flow of information relevant to wildlife enforcement and compliance with environmental agreements.

== History ==
=== Early development ===
The development of WEMS took place in the early 2000s in response to concerns about limitations in the availability and exchange of information relating to wildlife crime and environmental enforcement. The initial approach sought to develop a database containing both spatial and non-spatial information and to provide a common platform for information sharing.

The first prototype of WEMS was released in 2006 using data from Japan. The prototype incorporated spatial information on wildlife crime and included mapping and analytical functions. It was designed in part around information structures associated with the INTERPOL ecomessage framework.

The system was presented at meetings involving the international wildlife enforcement community, including a CITES Mekong regional meeting and an INTERPOL Wildlife Working Group meeting in 2006. It was subsequently demonstrated to representatives of the CITES community at the fourteenth Conference of the Parties (CoP14), held in The Hague in 2007.

Following the initial prototype, the WEMS system was redesigned to respond more directly to the requirements of national governments and wildlife law enforcement agencies. The revised approach placed greater emphasis on the role of governments as custodians of enforcement information. The redesigned system was presented at the CITES Enforcement Expert Group meeting in 2009 and at the fifteenth CITES Conference of the Parties (CoP15) in Doha in 2010.

=== Development in Africa ===
WEMS was subsequently developed as a transboundary information-sharing and geospatial decision-support concept in Africa. The African implementation involved the Lusaka Agreement Task Force (LATF), the United Nations University (UNU), and the Faculty of Geo-Information Science and Earth Observation (ITC) of the University of Twente.

The system was implemented in a number of African countries associated with the Lusaka Agreement framework. The African implementation sought to provide a mechanism through which national wildlife enforcement agencies could manage relevant information while enabling the exchange of selected information for transboundary cooperation.

The African implementation became associated with the name WEMS-Africa. The system was subsequently transferred to the Lusaka Agreement Task Force, which assumed responsibility for its continued management and operation.

The experience of developing WEMS in Africa was also examined in research concerning the institutional and political challenges involved in establishing transboundary enforcement information-sharing systems. Research on WEMS found that the adoption of such systems is influenced not only by technological considerations but also by differing policy beliefs, institutional interests, and perceptions of wildlife conservation and enforcement among stakeholders.

== Technology and information sharing ==
WEMS combines geographic information system technology with structured information concerning wildlife crime and enforcement. Its geospatial approach allows information to be analysed according to location and time and can support the identification of geographical patterns associated with wildlife crime and illegal trade.

An important feature of the WEMS concept is the distinction between national custodianship of enforcement information and the sharing of selected information for regional or international purposes. This approach was intended to address institutional and policy concerns surrounding the exchange of sensitive enforcement information across organisational and national boundaries.

The WEMS model has therefore been described as involving both technological and governance dimensions. The development of the system raised questions concerning data ownership, information security, confidentiality, institutional responsibilities, and the role of research organisations in analysing enforcement information.

== Research and environmental governance ==
Research on WEMS has examined the relationship between information management, environmental governance, and the implementation of multilateral environmental agreements. The original academic work on WEMS argued that restrictions on the flow of enforcement information can arise from both policy and technological factors and proposed an information technology framework intended to improve the flow of information between local, national, and international levels.

Subsequent research examined the policy and institutional challenges involved in developing a transboundary enforcement monitoring system. This research identified differences in the perspectives and policy beliefs of stakeholders involved in wildlife conservation and enforcement and examined how these differences could affect the adoption of information-sharing systems.

The development of WEMS has consequently been studied as an example of the challenges involved in connecting different institutional and professional communities through digital information systems. The research has also examined the role of GIS and spatial data in supporting wildlife crime monitoring and environmental policy analysis.

== WEMS Initiative ==
The WEMS Initiative is the broader research and policy initiative associated with the development and evolution of the Wildlife Enforcement Monitoring System. The initiative focuses on the relationship between wildlife enforcement, information sharing, geospatial technologies, and environmental governance.

The initiative's work has included research into transboundary information sharing and the institutional challenges associated with the management of wildlife enforcement information. It has also explored the wider application of digital technologies and information infrastructures to environmental governance.

The evolution of WEMS and its relationship with environmental governance are examined by Remi Chandran in his 2025 book, The Wildlife Enforcement Monitoring System: From Silos to Synergy in Environmental Governance, published by Springer Nature. The book traces the development of WEMS over approximately two decades and examines the technological, institutional, and policy challenges associated with wildlife law enforcement information sharing. It also discusses the role of GIS, stakeholder collaboration, policy implementation, and boundary work in the development and adoption of the system.

The book also examines the subsequent evolution of the WEMS concept and its relationship to broader approaches to digital information infrastructure and environmental governance.

== See also ==
Illegal wildlife trade Wildlife crime Wildlife conservation Convention on International Trade in Endangered Species of Wild Fauna and Flora Lusaka Agreement Task Force Environmental governance Geographic information system
