= Environmental crime =

Illegal act which directly harms the environment

Environmental crime is an illegal act which directly harms the environment. These illegal activities involve the environment, wildlife, biodiversity, and natural resources. International bodies such as G7, Interpol, European Union, United Nations Environment Programme, United Nations Interregional Crime and Justice Research Institute, have recognized the following environmental crimes: Wild life crime, Illegal mining, Pollution crimes, Illegal, unreported and unregulated fishing, and Illegal logging.

Environmental crime makes up almost a third of crimes committed by organizations such as; corporations, partnerships, unions, trusts, pension funds, and non-profits. It is the fourth largest criminal activity in the world and it is increasing by five to seven percent every year. These crimes are liable for prosecution. Interpol facilitates international police cooperation and assists its member countries in the effective enforcement of national and international environmental laws and treaties. Interpol began fighting environmental crime in 1992.

== Costs ==
International criminal gangs and militant groups profit from the plunder of natural resources and these illegal profits are soaring. Terrorism, and even civil wars are consequences of environmental crime. According to UNEP and Interpol, in June 2016 the value of environmental crime is 26 per cent larger than previous estimates, at US$91–258 billion, compared to US$70–213 billion in 2014, outstripping illegal trade in small arms. More than half of this amount can be attributed to illegal logging and deforestation.

== Prosecution by ICC ==
In September 2016 it was announced that the International Criminal Court (ICC) located in The Hague will prosecute government and individuals for environmental crimes. According to the Case Selection Criteria announced in Policy Paper on Case Selection and Prioritization by ICC on 15 September 2016, the Office will give particular consideration to prosecuting Rome Statute crimes that are committed by means of, or that result in, "inter alia, the destruction of the environment, the illegal exploitation of natural resources or the illegal dispossession of land".

== Environmental crime in the European Union ==
Within the European Union, the road to an effective enforcement of Environmental Crime legislation has been anything but straightforward. A major role is played by the Environmental Crime Directive, a 2008 instrument aimed at protecting the environment through the use of criminal law. Even though some studies show that there has been a decline in non-compliance with environmental policy by Member States, after over a decade from the publication of the first Directive, as part of the European Green Deal, the European Commission submitted a proposal for a new Directive with the aim of strengthening the enforcement and prosecution of environmental crimes through the use of clearer definitions and sanctions other than the typical fines and imprisonment.

== Causes of environmental crime ==
Causes of environmental crime include economic incentives, regulatory factors, and social/cultural factors.

- Illegal activities are driven by regulations creating cost differentials between legal and illegal products, compliance costs in different countries, demand for scarce products, and lack of concern for the environment.
- Illegal activities result from a lack of appropriate regulation, including failures to determine and/or protect property rights.
- Illegal activities exist due to problems with enforcement, including suitability of regulation/enforcement methodology, costs of compliance, regulatory capture, lack of resources and infrastructure, political will and/or expertise, corruption, and political and economic disruption.

== Environmental crime by country ==
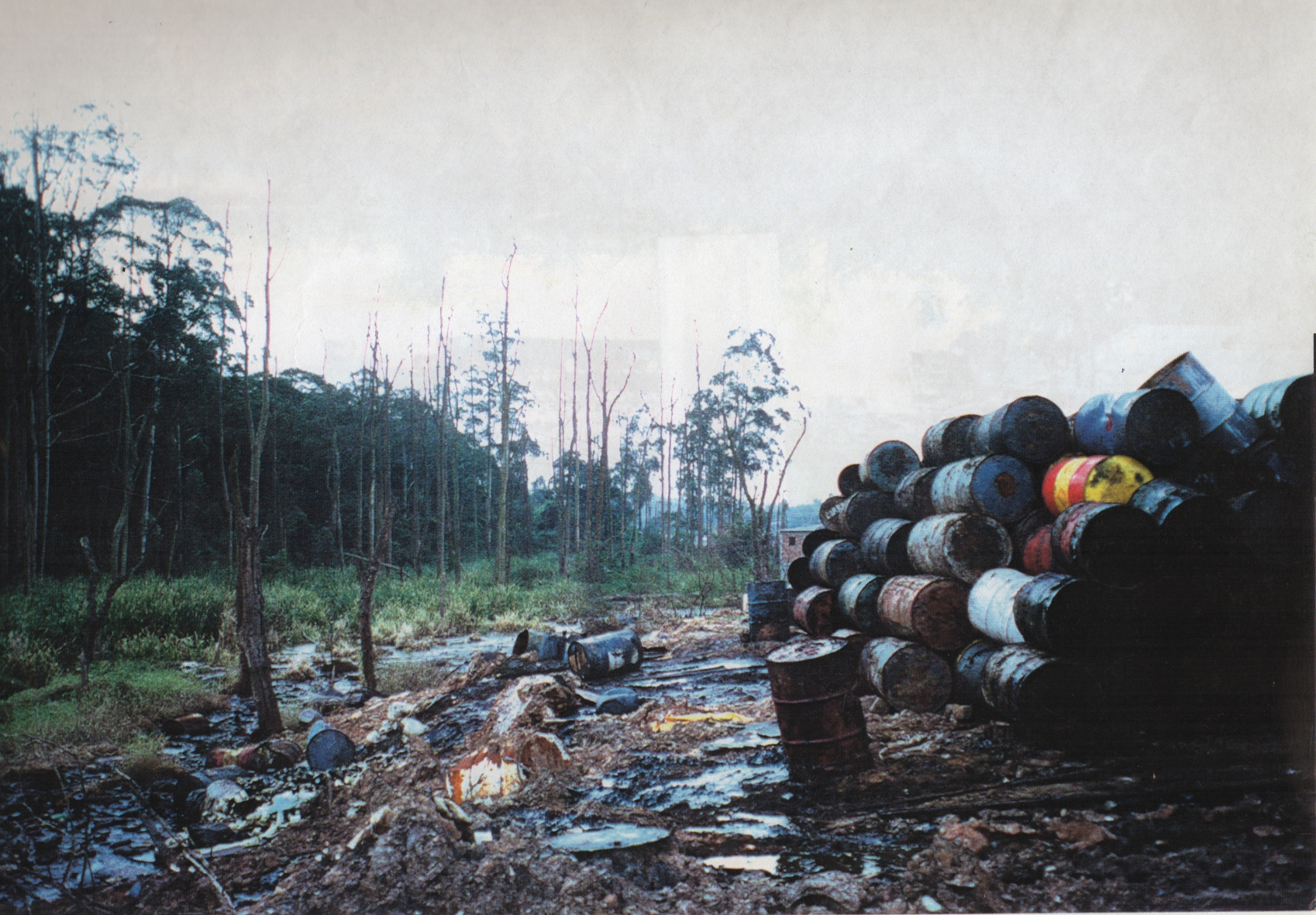
Environmental crimes include illegal dumping of waste

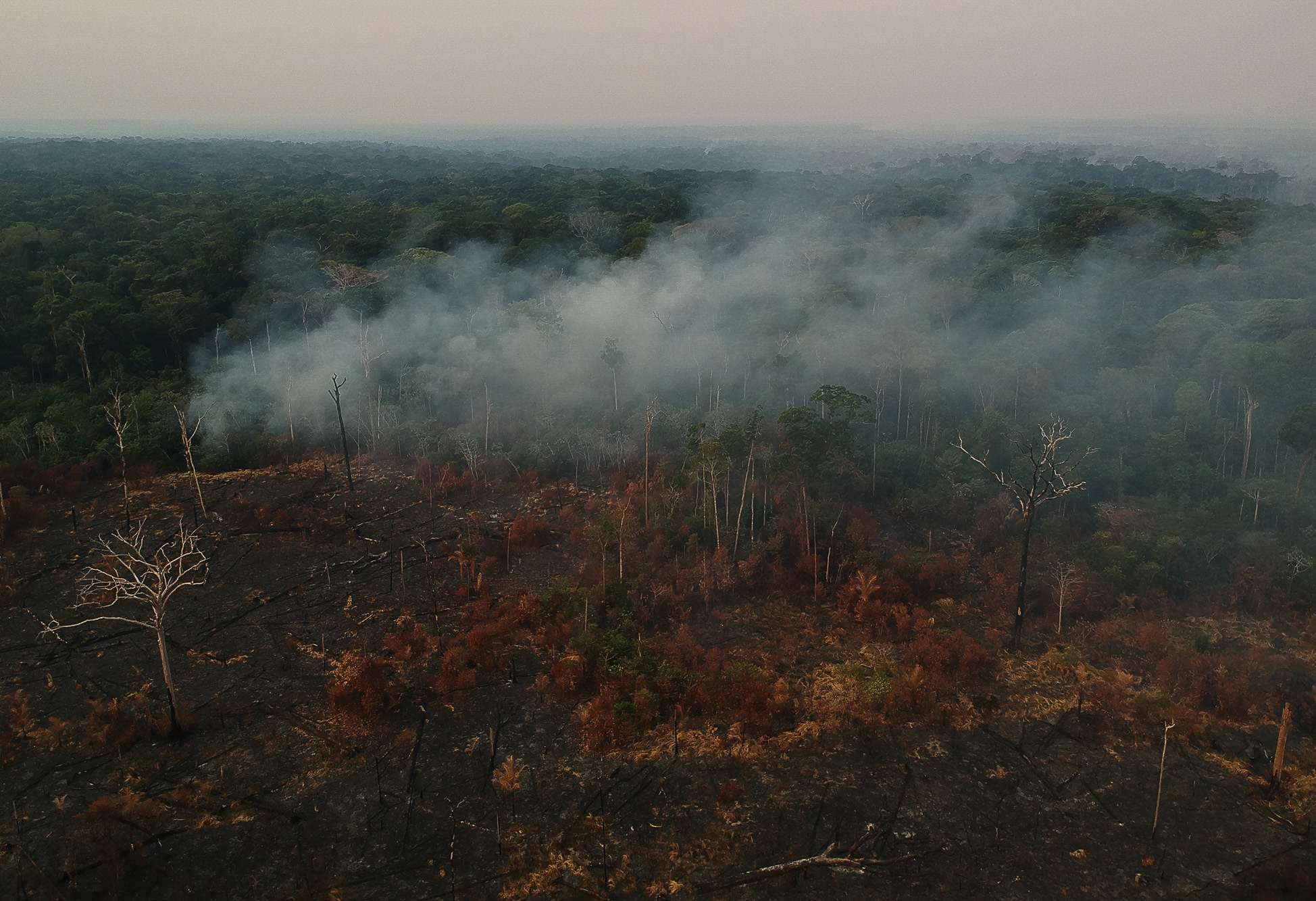
According to a 2015 article, even though slash and burn deforestation is technically illegal in Indonesia, the government has not regularly enforced the rules

=== United States ===
Abandoned or little used areas are common dumping places in America -especially railroads. Over $10 million a year are used to remove illegal dumping from polluting towns and the environment. A small organization, CSXT Police Environment Crimes Unit, has been started to stop railroad dumping specifically.

Ever since the Environmental Protection Agency's Office of Criminal Enforcement was founded in 1982, there has been a steady increase in prosecuted environmental crimes. This includes the prosecution of companies that have illegally dumped or caused oil spills. On a federal level, while the EPA oversees the investigations, the prosecutions are typically brought by the U.S. Department of Justice, through its Environmental Crimes Section, and/or through one of the 94 U.S. Attorney's Office across the country.

The Financial Crimes Enforcement Network is part of the Treasury Department which oversees the movement of money involving environmental crimes in the United States. This includes crimes such as illegal logging, fishing, and mining.

In a 2004 case study, a 30-pound cylinder of CFC-12 could be purchased in China for US$40 and illegally sold in the US for US$600.

In 2000, California real estate developer Eric Diesel was sentenced to 6 months in jail and ordered to pay a $300,000 fine for grading an illegal road in the Santa Cruz Mountains.

In 2023, eBay is accused by the Justice Department of violating environmental laws. The lawsuit states that eBay sold illegal equipment that override pollution controls on motorized vehicles, strictly forbidden products containing banned chemicals, and illegitimate pesticides. eBay Inc. faces legal action from the Justice Department for facilitating the sale and delivery of hundreds of thousands of items without authorization, in violation of the Federal Insecticide, Fungicide, and Rodenticide Act (FIFRA), the Toxic Substances Control Act (TSCA), and the Clean Air Act (CAA). The U.S. Environmental Protection Agency (EPA) filed the complaint in federal court in Brooklyn, NY.

In 2024, A California Man Was Arrested for Importing Hazardous Greenhouse Gases Into the United States. In defiance of laws meant to limit the use of greenhouse gases and prevent climate change, Michael Hart of San Diego was taken into custody on charges of smuggling greenhouse gasses into the U.S. from Mexico and then retailing them for a profit. Charges pertaining to the American Innovation and Manufacturing Act of 2020 (AIM Act) are being brought in this case for the first time in US history. Hydrofluorocarbons (HFCs) are widely utilized as refrigerants. The AIM Act forbids their importation unless the Environmental Protection Agency (EPA) grants permission.

Guam

In 2024, Agreement between the United States and the Guam Waterworks Authority requires infrastructure investment in the sewer system. The Settlement Will Handle Notoriety Overflows and Illegal Untreated Sewage Discharges Into Coastal Waters. Today, the Guam Waterworks Authority (GWA) and the United States reached a consent decree to enhance the condition of the GWA's sewer system. The project is expected to cost $400 million and address issues such as untreated sewage spills and other violations of the Clean Water Act. Another party to the deal is the Guam government.

=== Italy ===
An example of Ecomafia was Naples waste management where there was illegal dumping in the 1980s.

=== Nigeria ===
In Nigeria, the establishment of environmental agencies began in 1988 after an incident of dumping of toxic materials in the country by international waste traders (the infamous Koko incident). Presently, agencies such as the National Environmental Standards and Regulations Enforcement Agency (Nigeria) are empowered by Nigerian law to regulate the environment sector. This agency works with other organs of the government such as customs, police, military intelligence, etc., and has successfully seized illegally trafficked wildlife products and prosecuted a number persons, including non-nationals.

=== Singapore/Southeast Asia ===
As a trading hub, Singapore is susceptible to unnoticed contraband. Charles W. Schmidt explains how China sells illegal CFC-12 to the United States through Singapore due to the lack of inspections and confidentiality of private businesses in Singapore. In Southeast Asia there is an international environmental crime group named Xayzavang Network. They are known to hunt down wildlife including elephant for products such as ivory.

=== Russia ===
Violations of Russia's environmental protection laws cost the country more than $187 million in 2018. Out of nearly 23.9 thousand environmental crimes registered in Russia in 2018, the overwhelming majority were related to; the illegal cutting of forest plantations, amounting approximately to 13.8 thousand cases, and Illegal hunting, with over 1.9 thousand cases observed.

=== Netherlands ===
In the Netherlands, the Dutch are part of the North Sea which is one of the busiest seas in the world and also one of the most polluted seas. Boats in the North Sea will often illegally dump waste because it saves them time and money.

=== Other ===
The Islamic States

Often known as ISIS, The Islamic State has been previously known to have large sources of revenue come from environmental crime, usually the illegal trade of oil.

== Enforcement ==
The effective enforcement of environmental laws is vital to any protection regimes that are designed to protect the environment. In the early days of environmental legislation, violations carried largely insignificant civil fines and penalties. Initial environmental laws and regulations had little or no deterrent effect on corporations, individuals, or governments to comply with environmental laws. Indeed, a major source of failure of US environmental protection legislation was the civil character of federal enforcement actions. Their chief sanction was fines, which many corporations took in stride as a cost of doing business. Environmental criminal law covers a narrower ground. Its core consists of the criminal provisions of eight federal statutes passed mainly in the 1970s and amended in the last two decades.

The following are some of the ways that the EPA's criminal enforcement program goes after corporate and individual defendants who have committed major environmental crimes:

- Equipped with the necessary proof to pursue environmental offenses, federal, state, and local prosecutors
- Technical assessments and environmental forensic analyses for both civil and criminal enforcement
- Computerized evidence evaluation and retrieval
- Professional legal assistance and recommendations to the Department of Justice, U.S. Attorneys, and the EPA

Congress gave the EPA's criminal enforcement program broad law enforcement authority in 1988 after it was founded in 1982. Special agents, detectives, forensic scientists, technicians, attorneys, and support personnel are all employed by the program today.

In many cases, particularly corporations found it more cost-effective to continue to pollute more than the law allowed and simply pay any associate fines if indeed the corporation was actually found and convicted of violating environmental laws or regulations. Kevin Tomkins believes corporations had a disincentive to comply with environmental laws or regulations as compliance generally raised their operational costs. This was interpreted as many corporations obeying the environmental laws, whether out of a sense of legal duty or public obligation, were disadvantaged and lost a competitive edge and consequently suffered in the marketplace to competitors who disregarded environmental laws and regulations. As a result of weak environmental legislation and continued adverse public opinion regarding the management of the environment, many governments established various environmental enforcement regimes that dramatically increased the legal powers of environmental investigators. The inclusion of criminal sanctions, significant increases in fines coupled with possible imprisonment of corporate officers changed the face of environmental law enforcement. For example, between 1983 and 1990 the US Department of Justice secured $57,358,404.00 in criminal penalties and obtained sentences of imprisonment for 55% of defendants charged with environmental offences.

Many environmental agencies like the State Park Peace Officers and State Troopers, and more, play important roles in reducing environmental damage and protecting the environment through environmental laws and regulations. These agencies operate at varying levels from international, regional, national, state to local level keeping one agency working at one level. Various enforcement methods are employed by these agencies to warrant compliance with environmental laws and regulations. In some case's enforcement agencies use what is called "Command and Control" which are traditional regulatory approaches. In other cases, they may use economic incentive and hybrid-based approaches, which there are two. Moreover, it has increased the need for cooperation between different policing institutions. Environmental law enforcement agencies and police services do not operate in a vacuum; the legislative instruments that political systems implement govern their activities and responsibilities within society. However, ostensibly it is the legislative instruments implemented by governments that determine many of the strategies utilized by police services in protecting the environment. Generally these International, Regional, National and State legislative instruments are designed to ensure industries, individuals, and governments comply with the various environmental obligations embedded in national statutes and laws. There are also international legal instruments and treaties that also affect the way that sovereign states deal with environmental issues.

== Types of enforcement actions ==
The EPA or a state acting on its own power may take civil administrative actions, which are non-judicial enforcement measures. There is no legal court procedure involved in these acts. An administrative action taken by the state or the EPA could take the following forms:

a Superfund notice letter or notice of violation, or an order (with or without fines) instructing a person, company, or other entity to take action to clean up a site or comply.

Formal lawsuits are known as civil judicial actions. They are brought before the court against individuals or organizations that have not:

obey legislative or regulatory requirements, follow administrative directives, reimburse the EPA for Superfund site cleanup expenses, or pledge to undertake the cleanup.

== Environmental criminology ==
Environmental criminology examines the notions of crimes, offences and injurious behaviors against the environment and starts to examine the role that societies including corporations, governments and communities play in generating environmental harms. Criminology is now starting to recognize the impact of humans on the environment and how law enforcement agencies and the judiciary measure harm to the environment and attribute sanctions to the offenders. Environmental crime does not only affect the land, water, air, it affects the health of children as well.

According to an article published in Environmental Health Perspectives in 2016, "The evolution and expansion of children's environmental health protection over the past two decades has been remarkable. At the U.S. EPA, significant efforts have been made to address the special susceptibility of children, and our work continues to address emerging environmental concerns to ensure that children's environments are free of hazards and support healthy development."

== See also ==
- Category:Environmental crime
- Construction | Construction waste
- Ecocide
- Ecotax
- energy law
- Environment Agency
- Environmental Crime Prevention Program
- Environmental Investigation Agency
- Environmental issue
- Environmental killings
- Environmental law
- Fossil fuel
- Illegal logging
- Joss paper
- List of environmental lawsuits
- Poaching
- Power tool
- Reducing Emissions from Deforestation and Forest Degradation
- Scottish Environment Protection Agency
- Victimology
- Wildlife Enforcement Monitoring System
- Wildlife smuggling
