= Ivonne Higuero =

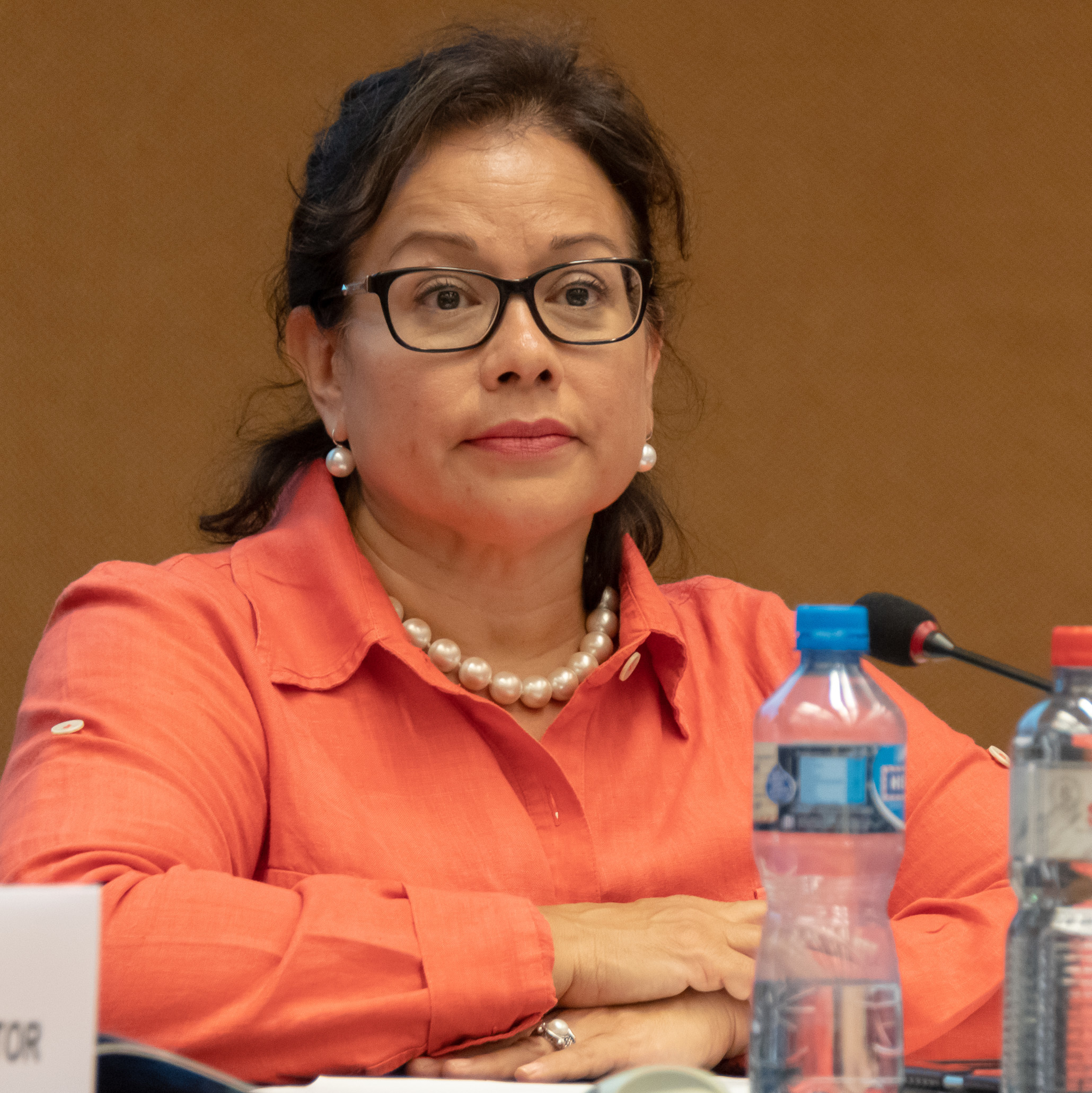
- Ivonne Higuero
- Alma mater: University of Missouri
- Employer: CITES (2018–)

Ivonne Higuero is a Panamanian environmental economist who has been the Secretary General of the Convention on International Trade in Endangered Species of Wild Fauna and Flora (CITES) since 2018.

== Education ==
Higuero holds a Bachelor of Science degree in Biology from the University of Missouri and a Masters’ of Environmental Management Degree in Natural Resource Economics and Policy from Duke University.

== Career ==
For 24 years, Higuero worked in a number of positions at the UN relating to environmental economics. In 2018, Higuero was appointed to the position of Secretary General of CITES, the first woman to lead the convention. Higuero led the CITES Secretariat during Conferences of the Parties in 2019 in Geneva, Switzerland (CoP18) and in 2022 in Panama City, Panama (CoP19).

During the coronavirus pandemic in 2020, she noted that preventing illegal wildlife trade not only helps conserving habitats, but these habitats create a safety barrier for humans that can prevent pathogens from animals passing themselves on to people.
