= CITES =

Multilateral treaty to protect flora and fauna

Convention on International Trade in Endangered Species of Wild Fauna and Flora
- Signed: 3 March 1973
- Location: Washington, D.C., United States
- Effective: 1 July 1975
- Condition: 10 ratifications
- Parties: 185
- Depositary: Government of the Swiss Confederation
- Language: English; French; Spanish

Full text
- Convention on International Trade in Endangered Species of Wild Fauna and Flora at Wikisource

CITES (shorter acronym for the Convention on International Trade in Endangered Species of Wild Fauna and Flora, also known as the Washington Convention) is a multilateral treaty to protect endangered plants and animals from the threats of international trade. It was drafted as a result of a resolution adopted in 1963 at a meeting of members of the International Union for Conservation of Nature (IUCN). The convention was opened for signature in 1973 and CITES entered into force on 1 July 1975.

Its aim is to ensure that international trade (import/export) in specimens of animals and plants included under CITES does not threaten the survival of the species in the wild. This is achieved via a system of permits and certificates. CITES affords varying degrees of protection to more than 40,900 species.

As of December 2024, the Secretary-General of CITES is Ivonne Higuero.

== Background ==
CITES is one of the largest and oldest conservation and sustainable use agreements in existence. There are three working languages of the convention (English, French and Spanish) in which all documents are made available. Participation is voluntary and countries that have agreed to be bound by the convention are known as Parties. Although CITES is legally binding on the Parties, it does not take the place of national laws. Rather it provides a framework respected by each Party, which must adopt their own domestic legislation to implement CITES at the national level.

Originally, CITES addressed depletion resulting from demand for luxury goods such as furs in Western countries, but with the rising wealth of Asia, particularly in China, the focus changed to products demanded there, particularly those used for luxury goods such as elephant ivory or rhinoceros horn. As of 2022, CITES has expanded to include thousands of species previously considered unremarkable and in no danger of extinction such as manta rays.

=== Ratifications ===
Parties to the treaty. Greenland is covered by CITES regulations through Denmark.

The text of the convention was finalized at a meeting of representatives of 80 countries in Washington, D.C., United States, on 3 March 1973. It was then open for signature until 31 December 1974. It entered into force after the 10th ratification by a signatory country, on 1 July 1975. Countries that signed the Convention become Parties by ratifying, accepting or approving it. By the end of 2003, all signatory countries had become Parties. States that were not signatories may become Parties by acceding to the convention. As of June 2025, the convention has 185 parties, including 184 states and the European Union.

The CITES Convention includes provisions and rules for trade with non-Parties. All member states of the United Nations are party to the treaty, with the exception of North Korea, Federated States of Micronesia, Haiti, Kiribati, Marshall Islands, Nauru, South Sudan, East Timor, and Tuvalu. UN observer the Holy See is also not a member. The Faroe Islands, an autonomous region in the Kingdom of Denmark, is also treated as a non-Party to CITES (both the Danish mainland and Greenland are part of CITES).

An amendment to the text of the convention, known as the Gaborone Amendment allows regional economic integration organizations (REIO), such as the European Union, to have the status of a member state and to be a Party to the convention. The REIO can vote at CITES meetings with the number of votes representing the number of members in the REIO, but it does not have an additional vote.

In accordance with Article XVII, paragraph 3, of the CITES Convention, the Gaborone Amendment entered into force on 29 November 2013, 60 days after 54 (two-thirds) of the 80 States that were party to CITES on 30 April 1983 deposited their instrument of acceptance of the amendment. At that time it entered into force only for those States that had accepted the amendment. The amended text of the convention will apply automatically to any State that becomes a Party after 29 November 2013. For States that became party to the convention before that date and have not accepted the amendment, it will enter into force 60 days after they accept it.

== Governing Structure of CITES ==
CITES operates to support the member Parties. This support consists of the input from three Committees (Standing, Animal and Plant) who are overseen by the Secretary-General. The secretariat position has been held by a variety of people from different nations.

=== Timeline of CITES Secretary-General Offices ===
1978-1981: Peter H. Sand

He was born in Bavaria, Germany and was educated in international law in Germany, France and Canada. He became a professor and an author, focusing on environmental law, holding other positions such as the Director-General of the IUCN and legal advisor for environmental affairs to the World Bank.

1982-1990: Eugene Lapointe

A Canadian native, Lapointe served in the military for many years and acted as a diplomat before governing the CITES. He is currently an author and holds the position of President of the IWMC World Conservation Trust, a non-profit organization that promotes wildlife conservation with an emphasis on a human-centered approach to natural-resources.

1991 - 1998: Izgrev Topkov

Born and raised in Bulgaria, Topkov was a diplomat before managing CITES, and was removed from that position following the misuse of permits that violated CITES guidelines.

1999 - 2010: Willem Wijnstekers

A native of the Netherlands and graduate from the University of Amsterdam, Wijnsteker held the position of Secretary-General for the longest period of time and is now an author.

2010 - 2018: John E. Scanlon

An Australian who studied environmental law, Scanlon was active in combating illegal animal trade and currently works in the effort to protect Elephants in Africa as CEO of the Elephant Protection Initiative Foundation (EPIF).

2018- Current: Ivonne Higuero

The first woman to hold this position, Higuero was educated in environmental economics and is from Panama.

== Regulation of trade ==
CITES works by subjecting international trade in specimens of listed taxa to controls as they move across international borders. CITES specimens can include a wide range of items including the whole animal/plant (whether alive or dead), or a product that contains a part or derivative of the listed taxa such as cosmetics or traditional medicines.

Four types of trade are recognized by CITES - import, export, re-export (export of any specimen that has previously been imported) and introduction from the sea (transportation into a state of specimens of any species which were taken in the marine environment not under the jurisdiction of any state). The CITES definition of "trade" does not require a financial transaction to be occurring. All trade in specimens of species covered by CITES must be authorized through a system of permits and certificates prior to the trade taking place. CITES permits and certificates are issued by one or more Management Authorities in charge of administering the CITES system in each country. Management Authorities are advised by one or more Scientific Authorities on the effects of trade of the specimen on the status of CITES-listed species. CITES permits and certificates must be presented to relevant border authorities in each country in order to authorize the trade.

Each party must enact their own domestic legislation to bring the provisions of CITES into effect in their territories. Parties may choose to take stricter domestic measures than CITES provides (for example by requiring permits/certificates in cases where they would not normally be needed or by prohibiting trade in some specimens).

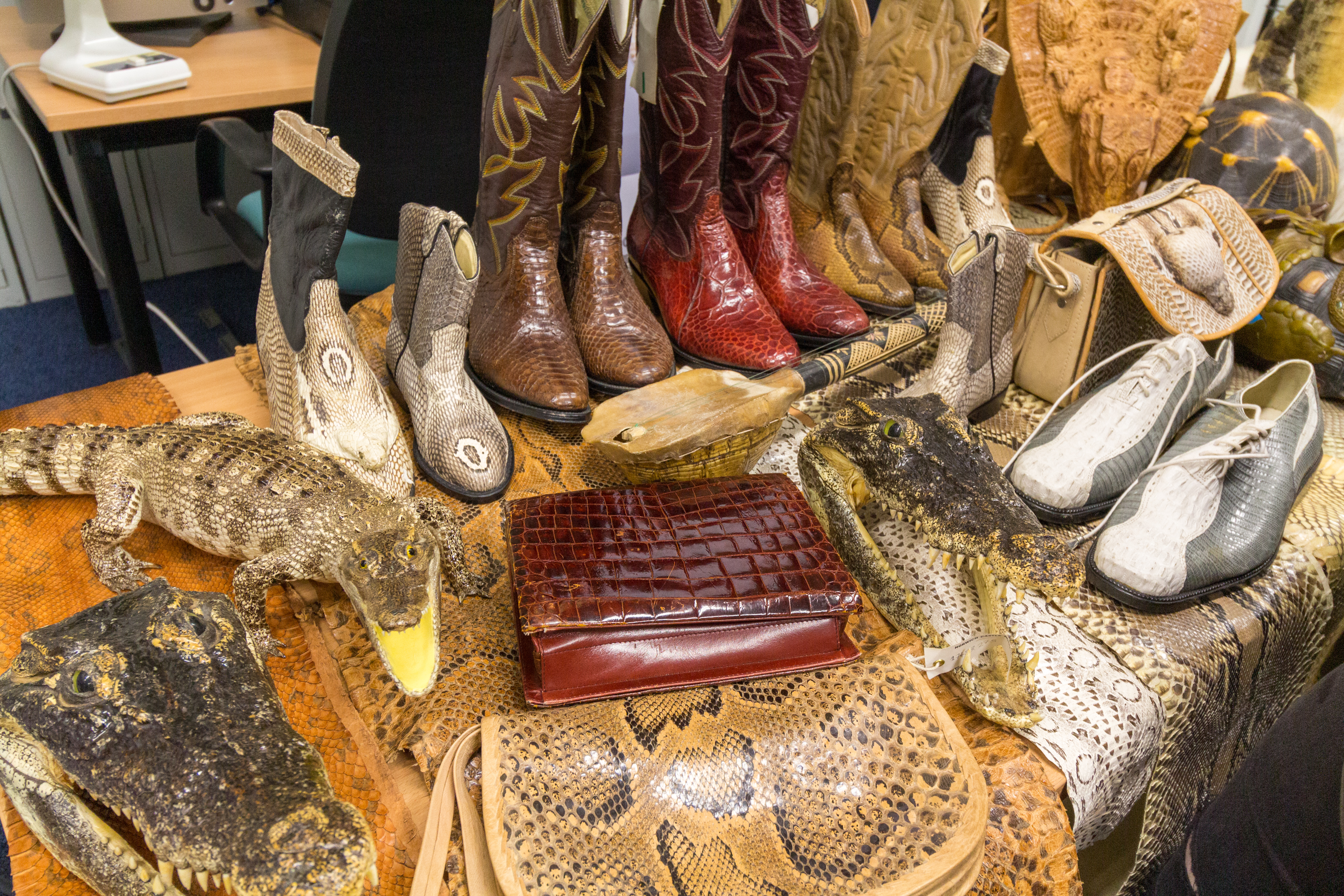
Illegally traded wildlife items seized by HM Revenue and Customs in the United Kingdom

=== Appendices ===
Over 40,900 species, subspecies and populations are protected under CITES. Each protected taxa or population is included in one of three lists called Appendices. The Appendix that lists a taxon or population reflects the level of the threat posed by international trade and the CITES controls that apply.

Taxa may be split-listed meaning that some populations of a species are on one Appendix, while some are on another. The African bush elephant (Loxodonta africana) is currently split-listed, with all populations except those of Botswana, Namibia, South Africa and Zimbabwe listed in Appendix I. Those of Botswana, Namibia, South Africa and Zimbabwe are listed in Appendix II. There are also species that have only some populations listed in an Appendix. One example is the pronghorn (Antilocapra americana), a ruminant native to North America. Its Mexican population is listed in Appendix I, but its U.S. and Canadian populations are not listed (though certain U.S. populations in Arizona are nonetheless protected under other domestic legislation, in this case the Endangered Species Act).

Taxa are proposed for inclusion, amendment or deletion in Appendices I and II at meetings of the Conference of the Parties (CoP), which are held approximately once every three years. Amendments to listing in Appendix III may be made unilaterally by individual parties.

==== Appendix I ====
Appendix I taxa are those that are threatened with extinction and to which the highest level of CITES protection is afforded. Commercial trade in wild-sourced specimens of these taxa is not permitted and non-commercial trade is strictly controlled by requiring an import permit and export permit to be granted by the relevant Management Authorities in each country before the trade occurs.

Notable taxa listed in Appendix I include the red panda (Ailurus fulgens), western gorilla (Gorilla gorilla), the chimpanzee species (Pan spp.), tigers (Panthera tigris sp.), Asian elephant (Elephas maximus), snow leopard (Panthera uncia), red-shanked douc (Pygathrix nemaeus), some populations of African bush elephant (Loxodonta africana), (Note: CITES treats the African forest elephant as a subspecies of L. africana and thus protected under Appendix I; most authorities now classify the forest elephant as a separate species, L. cyclotis.) and the monkey puzzle tree (Araucaria araucana).

==== Appendix II ====
Appendix II taxa are those that are not necessarily threatened with extinction, but trade must be controlled in order to avoid utilization incompatible with their survival. Appendix II taxa may also include species similar in appearance to species already listed in the Appendices. The vast majority of taxa listed under CITES are listed in Appendix II. Any trade in Appendix II taxa standardly requires a CITES export permit or re-export certificate to be granted by the Management Authority of the exporting country before the trade occurs.

Examples of taxa listed on Appendix II are the great white shark (Carcharodon carcharias), the American black bear (Ursus americanus), Hartmann's mountain zebra (Equus zebra hartmannae), green iguana (Iguana iguana), queen conch (Strombus gigas), emperor scorpion (Pandinus imperator), Mertens' water monitor (Varanus mertensi), bigleaf mahogany (Swietenia macrophylla), lignum vitae (Guaiacum officinale), the chambered nautilus (Nautilus pompilius), all stony corals (Scleractinia spp.), Jungle cat (Felis chaus) and American ginseng (Panax quinquefolius).

==== Appendix III ====
Appendix III species are those that are protected in at least one country, and that country has asked other CITES Parties for assistance in controlling the trade. Any trade in Appendix III species standardly requires a CITES export permit (if sourced from the country that listed the species) or a certificate of origin (from any other country) to be granted before the trade occurs.

Examples of species listed on Appendix III and the countries that listed them are the Hoffmann's two-toed sloth (Choloepus hoffmanni) by Costa Rica, sitatunga (Tragelaphus spekii) by Ghana and African civet (Civettictis civetta) by Botswana.

=== Exemptions and special procedures ===
Under Article VII, the Convention allows for certain exceptions to the general trade requirements described above.

==== Pre-Convention specimens ====
CITES provides for a special process for specimens that were acquired before the provisions of the Convention applied to that specimen. These are known as "pre-Convention" specimens and must be granted a CITES pre-Convention certificate before the trade occurs. Only specimens legally acquired before the date on which the species concerned was first included in the Appendices qualify for this exemption.

==== Personal and household effects ====
CITES provides that the standard permit/certificate requirements for trade in CITES specimens do not generally apply if a specimen is a personal or household effect. However, there are a number of situations where permits/certificates for personal or household effects are required and some countries choose to take stricter domestic measures by requiring permits/certificates for some or all personal or household effects.

==== Captive bred or artificially propagated specimens ====
CITES allows trade in specimens to follow special procedures if Management Authorities are satisfied that they are sourced from captive bred animals or artificially propagated plants. In the case of commercial trade of Appendix I taxa, captive bred or artificially propagated specimens may be traded as if they were Appendix II. This reduces the permit requirements from two permits (import/export) to one (export only). In the case of non-commercial trade, specimens may be traded with a certificate of captive breeding/artificial propagation issued by the Management Authority of the state of export in lieu of standard permits.

==== Scientific exchange ====
Standard CITES permit and certificates are not required for the non-commercial loan, donation or exchange between scientific or forensic institutions that have been registered by a Management Authority of their State. Consignments containing the specimens must carry a label issued or approved by that Management Authority (in some cases Customs Declaration labels may be used). Specimens that may be included under this provision include museum, herbarium, diagnostic and forensic research specimens. Registered institutions are listed on the CITES website.

== Amendments and reservations ==
Amendments to the Convention must be supported by a two-thirds majority who are "present and voting" and can be made during an extraordinary meeting of the COP if one-third of the Parties are interested in such a meeting. The Gaborone Amendment (1983) allows regional economic blocs to accede to the treaty. Trade with non-Party states is allowed, although permits and certificates are recommended to be issued by exporters and sought by importers.

Species in the Appendices may be proposed for addition, change of Appendix, or de-listing (i.e., deletion) by any Party, whether or not it is a range State and changes may be made despite objections by range States if there is sufficient (2/3 majority) support for the listing. Species listings are made at the Conference of Parties.

Upon acceding to the convention or within 90 days of a species listing being amended, Parties may make reservations. In these cases, the party is treated as being a state that is not a Party to CITES with respect to trade in the species concerned. Notable reservations include those by Iceland, Japan, and Norway on various baleen whale species and those on Falconiformes by Saudi Arabia.

== Shortcomings and concerns ==
=== Implementation ===
As of 2002, 50% of Parties lacked one or more of the four major CITES requirements - designation of Management and Scientific Authorities; laws prohibiting the trade in violation of CITES; penalties for such trade and laws providing for the confiscation of specimens.

Although the Convention itself does not provide for arbitration or dispute in the case of noncompliance, 36 years of CITES in practice has resulted in several strategies to deal with infractions by Parties. The Secretariat, when informed of an infraction by a Party, will notify all other parties. The Secretariat will give the Party time to respond to the allegations and may provide technical assistance to prevent further infractions. Other actions the Convention itself does not provide for but that derive from subsequent COP resolutions may be taken against the offending Party. These include:

- Mandatory confirmation of all permits by the Secretariat
- Suspension of cooperation from the Secretariat
- A formal warning
- A visit by the Secretariat to verify capacity
- Recommendations to all Parties to suspend CITES related trade with the offending party
- Dictation of corrective measures to be taken by the offending Party before the Secretariat will resume cooperation or recommend resumption of trade

Bilateral sanctions have been imposed on the basis of national legislation (e.g. the USA used certification under the Pelly Amendment to get Japan to revoke its reservation to hawksbill turtle products in 1991, thus reducing the volume of its exports).

Infractions may include negligence with respect to permit issuing, excessive trade, lax enforcement, and failing to produce annual reports (the most common).

In 2022, U.S. prosecutors alleged that CITES documentation was used to export wild-caught crab-eating macaques (Macaca fascicularis) from Cambodia as captive-bred for biomedical research, and the issue later drew CITES Standing Committee scrutiny (see Cambodian crab-eating macaque export controversy).

=== Approach to biodiversity conservation ===
General limitations about the structure and philosophy of CITES include: by design and intent it focuses on trade at the species level and does not address habitat loss, ecosystem approaches to conservation, or poverty; it seeks to prevent unsustainable use rather than promote sustainable use (which generally conflicts with the Convention on Biological Diversity), although this has been changing (see Nile crocodile, African elephant, South African white rhino case studies in Hutton and Dickinson 2000). It does not explicitly address market demand. In fact, CITES listings have been demonstrated to increase financial speculation in certain markets for high value species. Funding does not provide for increased on-the-ground enforcement (it must apply for bilateral aid for most projects of this nature).

There has been increasing willingness within the Parties to allow for trade in products from well-managed populations. For instance, sales of the South African white rhino have generated revenues that helped pay for protection. Listing the species on Appendix I increased the price of rhino horn (which fueled more poaching), but the species survived wherever there was adequate on-the-ground protection. Thus field protection may be the primary mechanism that saved the population, but it is likely that field protection would not have been increased without CITES protection.

In another instance, the United States initially stopped exports of bobcat and lynx hides in 1977 when it first implemented CITES for lack of data to support no detriment findings. However, in this Federal Register notice, issued by William Yancey Brown, the U.S. Endangered Species Scientific Authority (ESSA) established a framework of no detriment findings for each state and the Navajo nation and indicated that approval would be forthcoming if the states and Navajo nation provided evidence that their furbearer management programs assured the species would be conserved. Management programs for these species expanded rapidly, including tagging for export, and are currently recognized in program approvals under regulations of the U.S. Fish and Wildlife Service.

=== Drafting ===
By design, CITES regulates and monitors trade in the manner of a "negative list" such that trade in all species is permitted and unregulated unless the species in question appears on the Appendices or looks very much like one of those taxa. Then and only then, trade is regulated or constrained. Because the remit of the Convention covers millions of species of plants and animals, and tens of thousands of these taxa are potentially of economic value, in practice this negative list approach effectively forces CITES signatories to expend limited resources on just a select few, leaving many species to be traded with neither constraint nor review. For example, recently several bird classified as threatened with extinction appeared in the legal wild bird trade because the CITES process never considered their status. If a "positive list" approach were taken, only species evaluated and approved for the positive list would be permitted in trade, thus lightening the review burden for member states and the Secretariat, and also preventing inadvertent legal trade threats to poorly known species.

Specific weaknesses in the text include: it does not stipulate guidelines for the 'non-detriment' finding required of national Scientific Authorities; non-detriment findings require copious amounts of information; the 'household effects' clause is often not rigid enough/specific enough to prevent CITES violations by means of this Article (VII); non-reporting from Parties means Secretariat monitoring is incomplete; and it has no capacity to address domestic trade in listed species.

In order to ensure that the General Agreement on Tariffs and Trade (GATT) was not violated, the Secretariat of GATT was consulted during the drafting process.

=== Animal sourced pathogens ===
During the coronavirus pandemic in 2020 CEO Ivonne Higuero noted that illegal wildlife trade not only helps to destroy habitats, but these habitats create a safety barrier for humans that can prevent pathogens from animals passing themselves on to people.

=== Reform suggestions ===
Suggestions for improvement in the operation of CITES include: more regular missions by the Secretariat (not reserved just for high-profile species); improvement of national legislation and enforcement; better reporting by Parties (and the consolidation of information from all sources-NGOs, TRAFFIC, the wildlife trade monitoring network and Parties); more emphasis on enforcement-including a technical committee enforcement officer; the development of CITES Action Plans (akin to Biodiversity Action Plans related to the Convention on Biological Diversity) including: designation of Scientific/Management Authorities and national enforcement strategies; incentives for reporting and timelines for both Action Plans and reporting. CITES would benefit from access to Global Environment Facility (GEF), funds-although this is difficult given the GEFs more ecosystem approach-or other more regular funds. Development of a future mechanism similar to that of the Montreal Protocol (developed nations contribute to a fund for developing nations) could allow more funds for non-Secretariat activities.

=== TRAFFIC Data ===
From 2005 to 2009 the legal trade corresponded with these numbers:

- 317,000 live birds
- More than 2 million live reptiles
- 2.5 million crocodile skins
- 2.1 million snake skins
- 73 tons of caviar
- 1.1 million beaver skins
- Millions of pieces of coral
- 20,000 mammalian hunting trophies

In the 1990s the annual trade of legal animal products was $160 billion annually. In 2009 the estimated value almost doubled to $300 billion.

Traffic released a report in December 2024 outlining illegal trade in animal products occurring in Vietnam.

Additional information about the documented trade can be extracted through queries on the CITES website.

== Meetings ==
The Conference of the Parties (CoP) is held once every three years. The location of the next CoP is chosen at the close of each CoP by a secret ballot vote.

The CITES Committees (Animals Committee, Plants Committee and Standing Committee) hold meetings during each year that does not have a CoP, while the Standing committee meets also in years with a CoP. The Committee meetings take place in Geneva, Switzerland (where the Secretariat of the CITES Convention is located), unless another country offers to host the meeting. The Secretariat is administered by UNEP. The Animals and Plants Committees have sometimes held joint meetings. The previous joint meeting was held in March 2012 in Dublin, Ireland, and the latest one was held in Veracruz, Mexico, in May 2014.

Meeting	City	Country	Duration
CoP 1	Bern	Switzerland	2–6 November 1976
CoP 2	San José	Costa Rica	19–30 March 1979
CoP 3	New Delhi	India	25 February – 8 March 1981
CoP 4	Gaborone	Botswana	19–30 April 1983
CoP 5	Buenos Aires	Argentina	22 April – 3 May 1985
CoP 6	Ottawa	Canada	12–24 July 1987
CoP 7	Lausanne	Switzerland	9–20 October 1989
CoP 8	Kyoto	Japan	2–13 March 1992
CoP 9	Fort Lauderdale	United States	7–18 November 1994
CoP 10	Harare	Zimbabwe	9–20 June 1997
CoP 11	Nairobi	Kenya	10–20 April 2000
CoP 12	Santiago de Chile	Chile	3–15 November 2002
CoP 13	Bangkok	Thailand	2–14 October 2004
CoP 14	The Hague	Netherlands	3–15 June 2007
CoP 15	Doha	Qatar	13–25 March 2010
CoP 16	Bangkok	Thailand	3–14 March 2013
CoP 17	Johannesburg	South Africa	24 September – 5 October 2016
CoP 18	Geneva	Switzerland	17–28 August 2019
CoP 19	Panama City	Panama	14–25 November 2022
CoP 20	Samarkand	Uzbekistan	24 November – 5 December 2025

A current list of upcoming meetings appears on the CITES calendar.

At the seventeenth Conference of the Parties (CoP 17), Namibia and Zimbabwe introduced proposals to amend their listing of elephant populations in Appendix II. Instead, they wished to establish controlled trade in all elephant specimens, including ivory. They argue that revenue from regulated trade could be used for elephant conservation and rural communities' development. However, both proposals were opposed by the US and other countries.

== See also ==
- Environmental agreements
- Illegal logging
- IUCN Red List
- Ivory trade
- Lacey Act
- List of species protected by CITES Appendix I
- List of species protected by CITES Appendix II
- List of species protected by CITES Appendix III
- Shark finning
- Wildlife conservation
- Wildlife Enforcement Monitoring System
- Wildlife management
- Wildlife smuggling
- World Wildlife Day
