= Environmental Crime Prevention Program =

The Environmental Crime Prevention Program (ECPP) was an organization which tracked dumped nuclear waste, including Soviet nuclear missiles left over from the Cold War. It was founded by Italian lawyer and security consultant Mario Scaramella along with his partner Filippo Marino in Naples, Italy in 1997. Describing itself as a "permanent intergovernmental conference" focusing on environmental crime with rotating presidencies by such countries as Samoa and Angola, Sri Lanka and Slovakia, Romania and the US, its true purpose remains difficult to discern, and recently the ECPP has attracted the attention of Italian investigative authorities, who consider it to be a probable intelligence front organization.

== Mission and purpose ==
The website of Environmental Security International quotes Scaramella as describing the mission of the ECPP as "providing environmental protection and security through technology on a global basis, particularly for developing nations. ECPP has offices at the Fucino Space Center in Italy, the largest civilian space center in the world. ECPP has used aerial surveillance and the remote sensing capabilities of satellites to detect environmental crimes in Eastern ( in particoular Russia ) and Southern Europe and eco-terrorism in Central Africa and South America."

== Stealth conferences ==
Among the mysteries of the ECPP was a supposed "IV Plenary Conference" held at the United States Environmental Protection Agency's offices in New York, which Scaramella used to register for intergovernmental status. The ECPP's IV Plenary Conference reportedly lasted for all of one hour. The ECPP didn't even hold a First Plenary Conference, as Scaramella thought it more credible to directly pass to the Second Conference in order to succeed in fund-raising. The "IV Plenary Conference" was then used by Scaramella to give credit to his shell organisation when he went to see other official organisations.
