= List of early Christian and medieval mosaics =

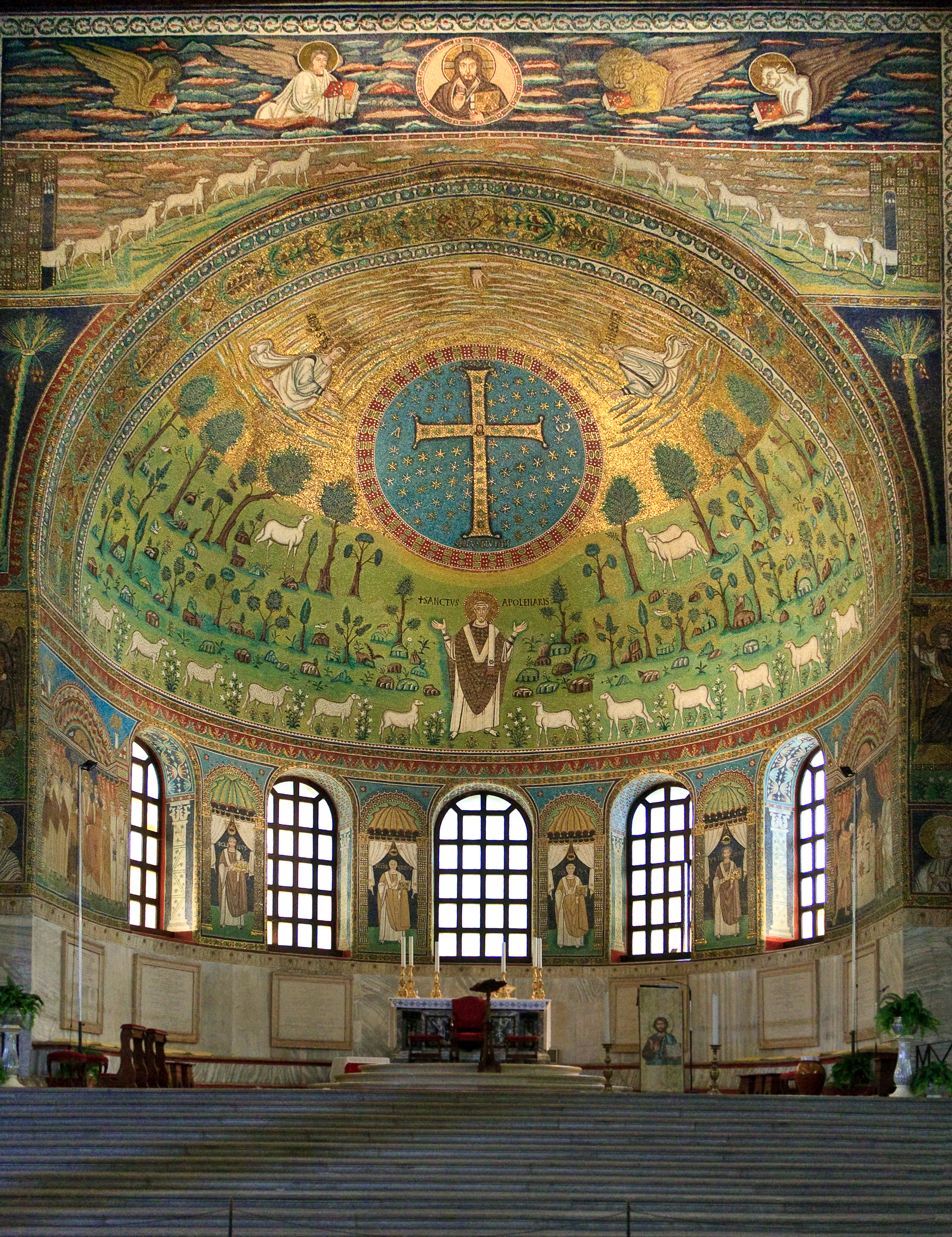
Apse mosaic of Church of Sant'Apollinare in Classe, Ravenna

Late Antique, Early Christian, and Medieval mosaics in Europe and the Middle East were created from the 4th to the 15th centuries, mostly in Christian countries.

List includes large and important mosaic pavements and wall coverings from churches and civic buildings (palaces, baths, or villas) and their current or former locations. This list does not include regular geometric floors or small fragments of figurative mosaics in museum collections. The list also includes Islamic buildings whose ornamental mosaics were made by visiting Byzantine masters or were clearly influenced by Byzantine style and technology.

Mosaics are divided into two main types: the older Roman version of opus tessellatum, used primarily for floor mosaics (at least until the 12th century), and, in parallel, the classic Byzantine method with gold smalt, invented by at least the 4th century AD. In the 12th century, the Cosmatesque style emerged in Italy, based on the existing Byzantine technique of inlaid floors (developed from Roman opus sectile). The Cosmatesque was used for floors and for the decorative ornamentation of walls, tombs, marble pulpits, and so on. The ancient Romans also knew the pietre dure method, but it was rarely used before the Renaissance.

In the first centuries, pagan, antique, geometric, and animalistic themes coexisted in parallel; then Christian ones joined them, eventually displacing them completely.

See also: Late Antique and medieval mosaics in Italy, Early Byzantine mosaics in the Middle East.

== 4th century ==
=== Algeria ===
- El-Asnam / Chlef, Basilica of San Reparatus — first known floor church labyrinth
- Djémila Museum, «Great Hunt Mosaic», from the banqueting hall in the House of Bacchus, , + other big mosaics in this museum
- Sétif Museum, «Triumph of Dionysos mosaic», + other big mosaics in this museum
- Triumph of Neptune and Amphitrite (Louvre, Ma 1880), from Ancient Cirta, today Constantine, Algeria
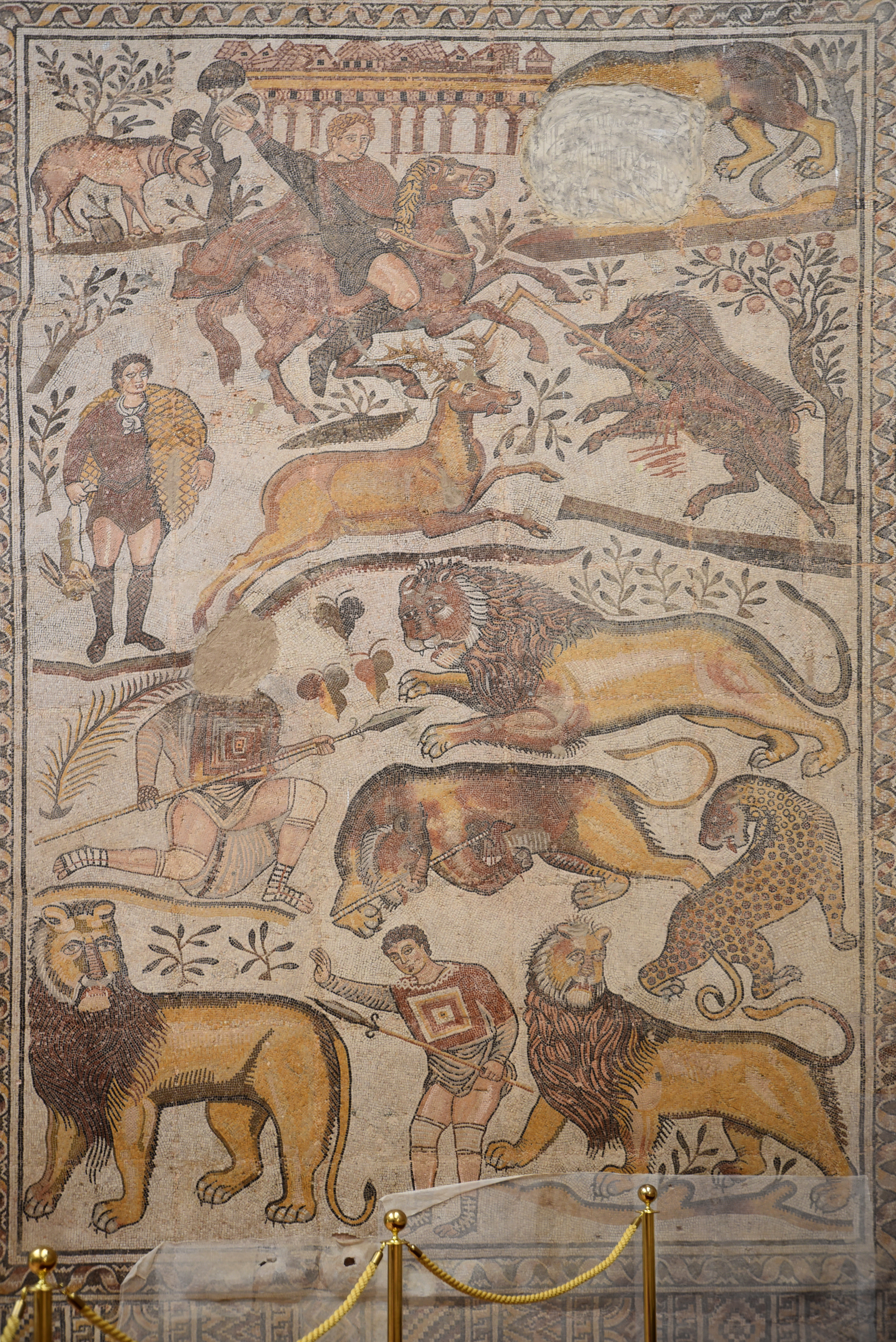
Djemila

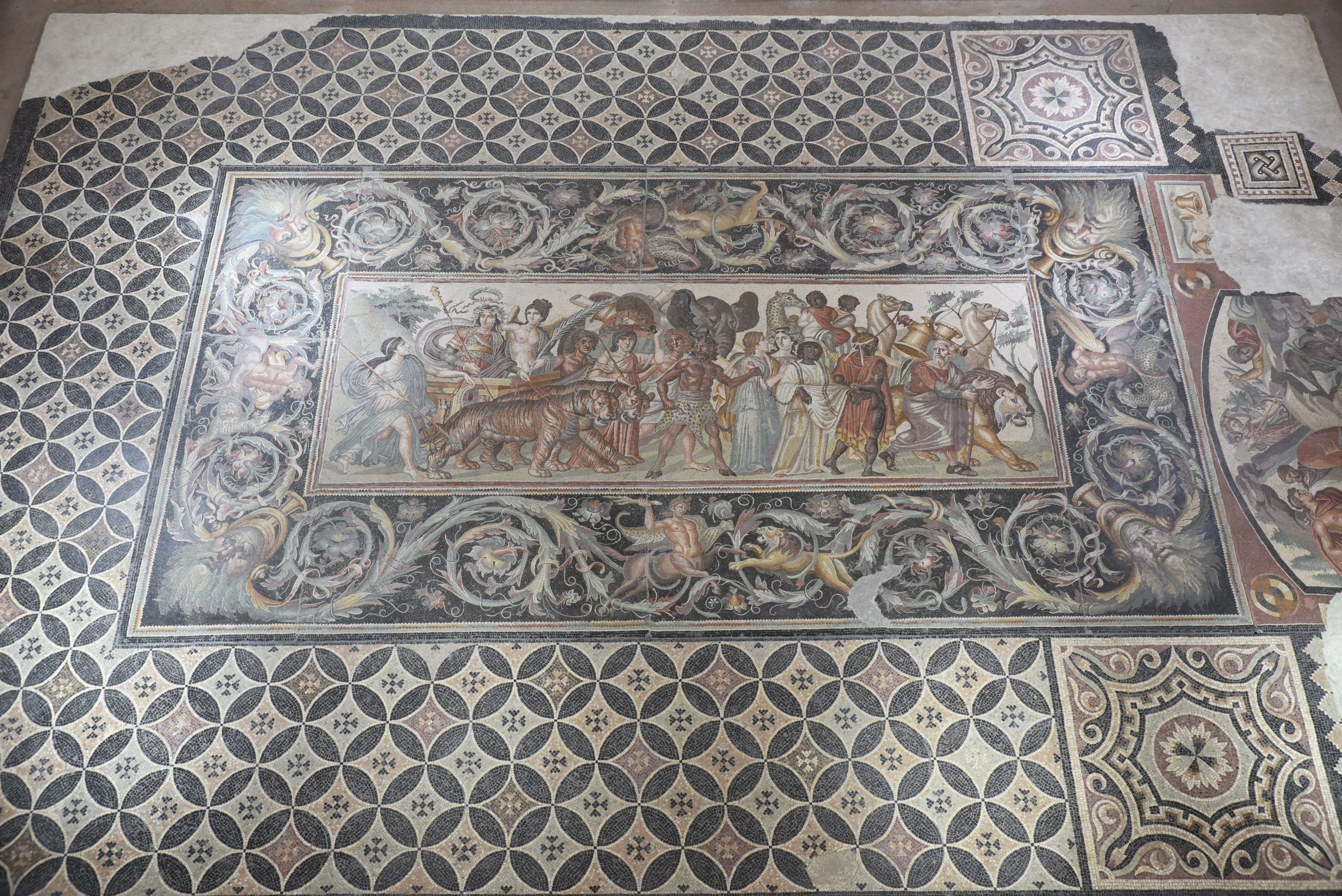
Setif

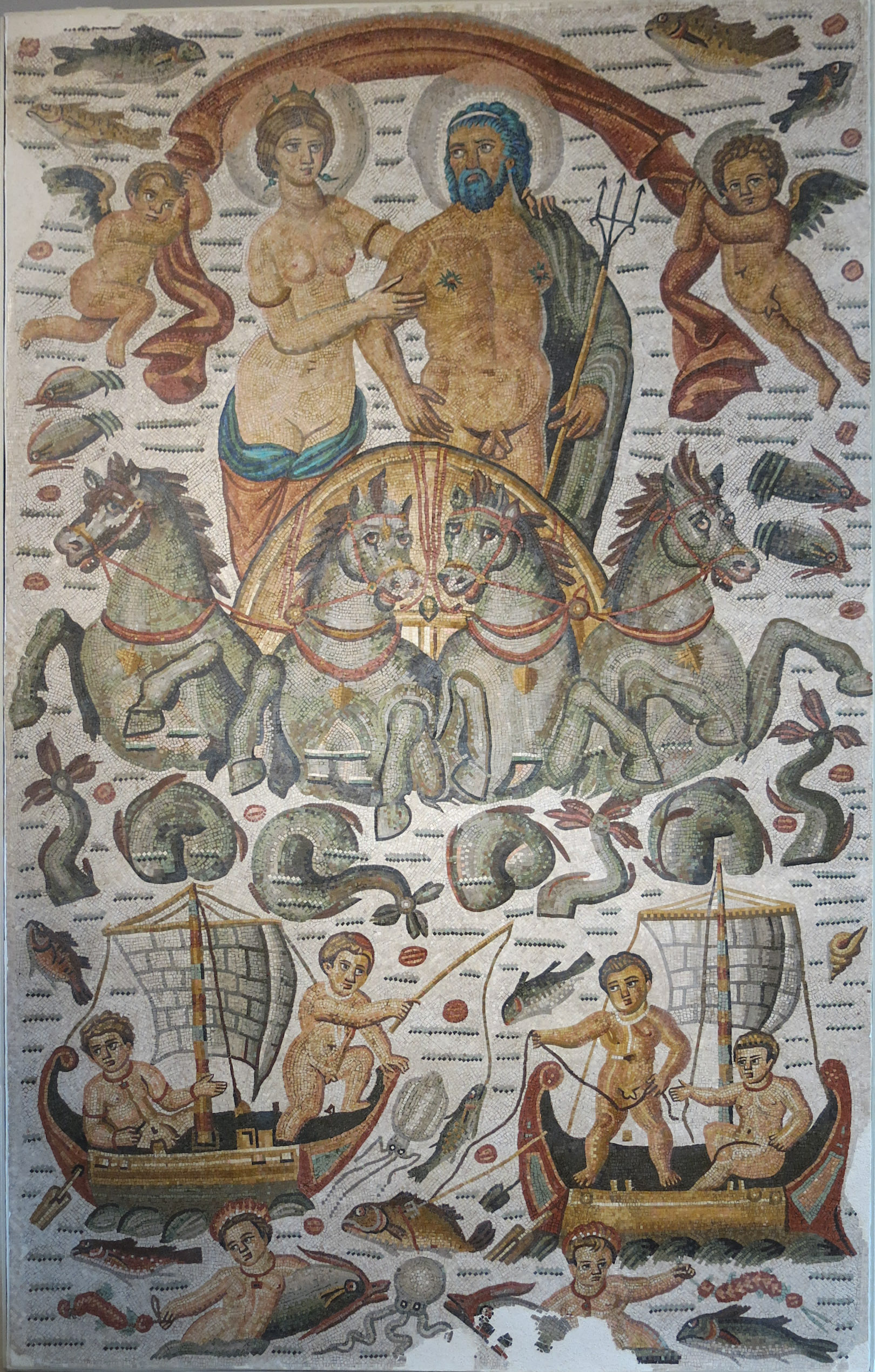
Louvre

=== Cyprus, Paphos ===
- House of Aion, Paphos Archaeological Park
- House of Theseus, Paphos Archaeological Park
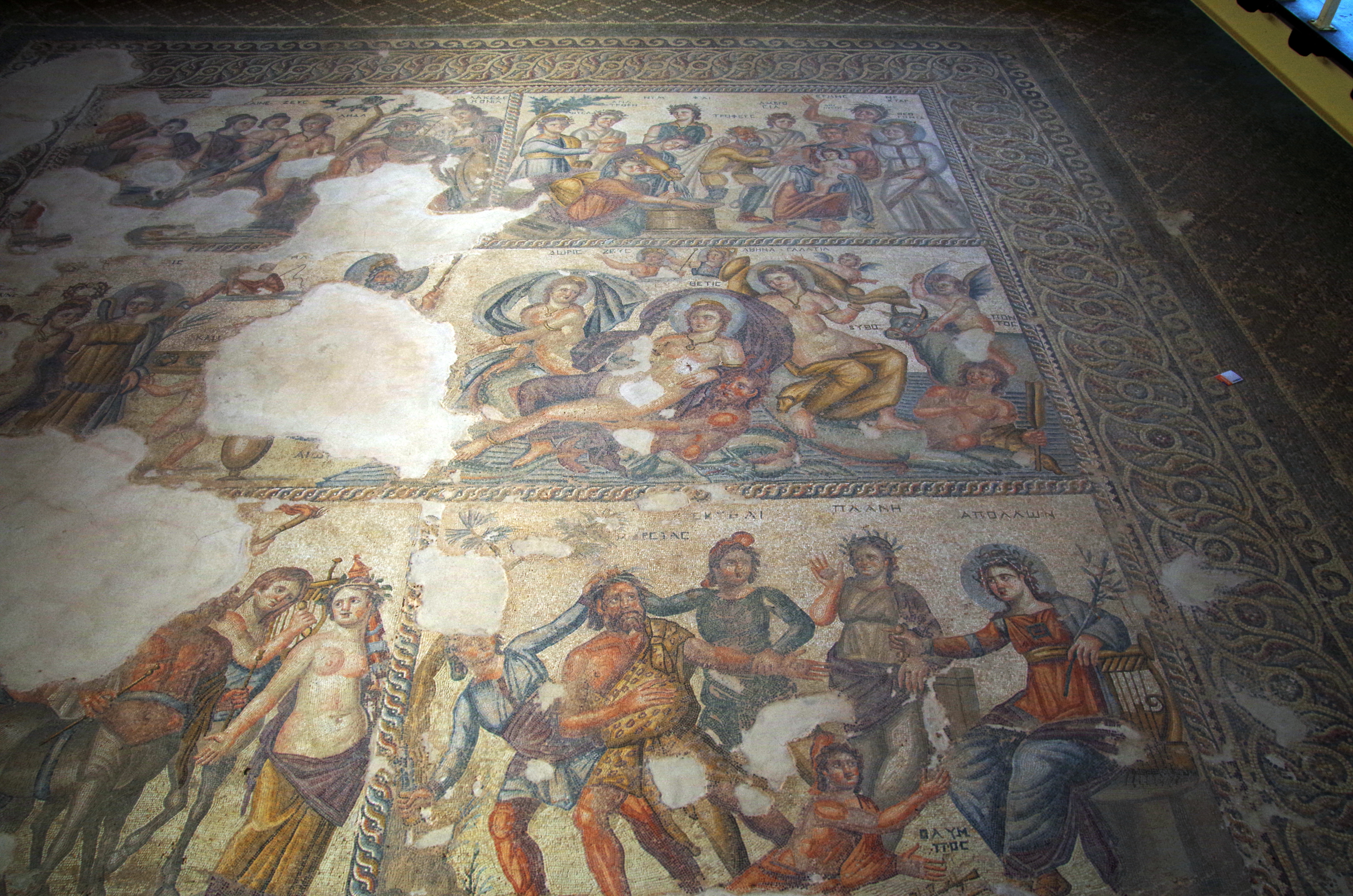
House of Aion

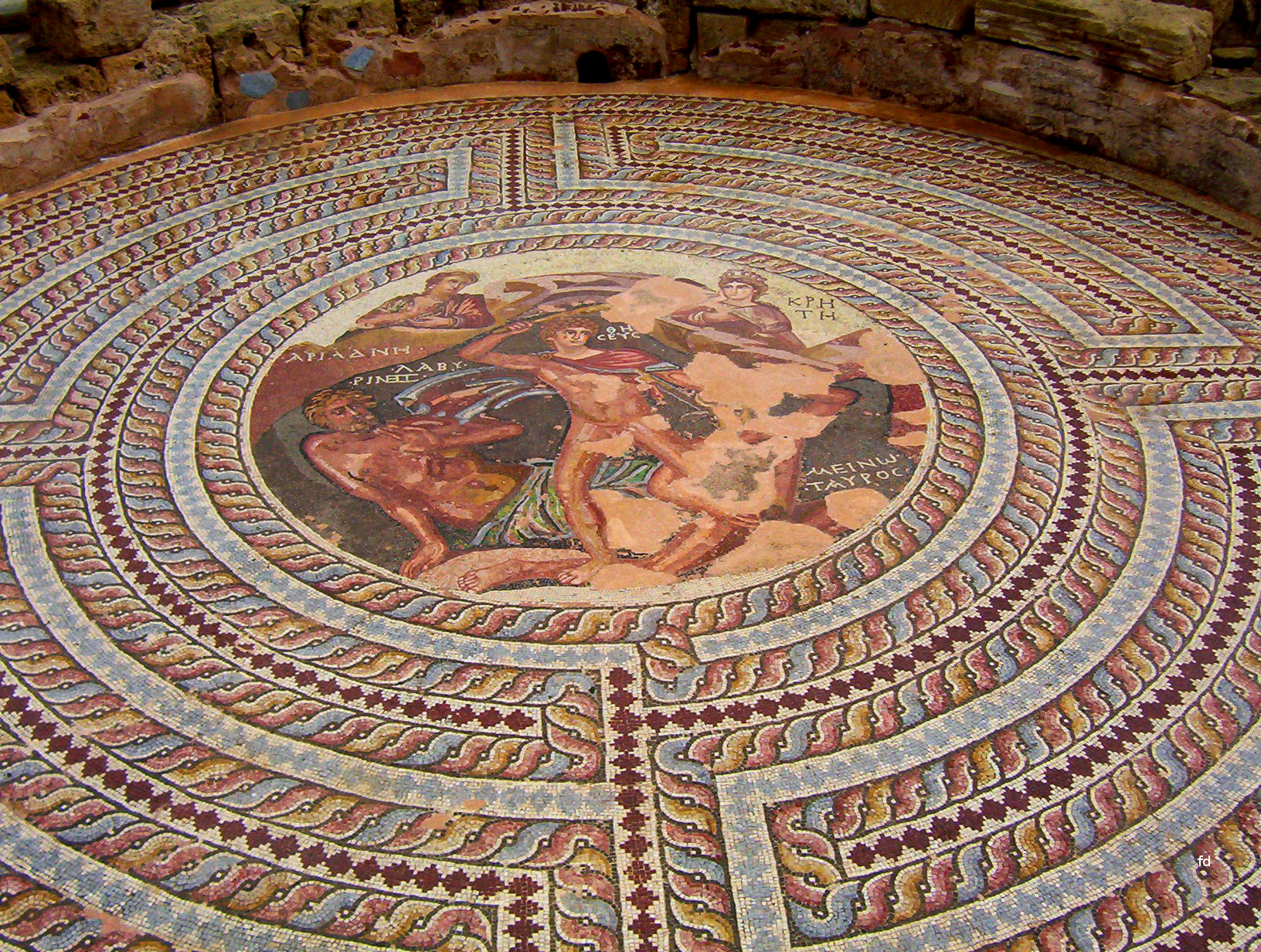
House of Theseus

=== Georgia ===
- Shukhuti (Guria), Shukhuti mosaic

=== Greece ===
- Amphipolis, Basilica D, (4th–7th)
- Thessaloniki, Martyrium (Hagios Demetrios?)
- Thessaloniki, The Rotunda (Church of St George)
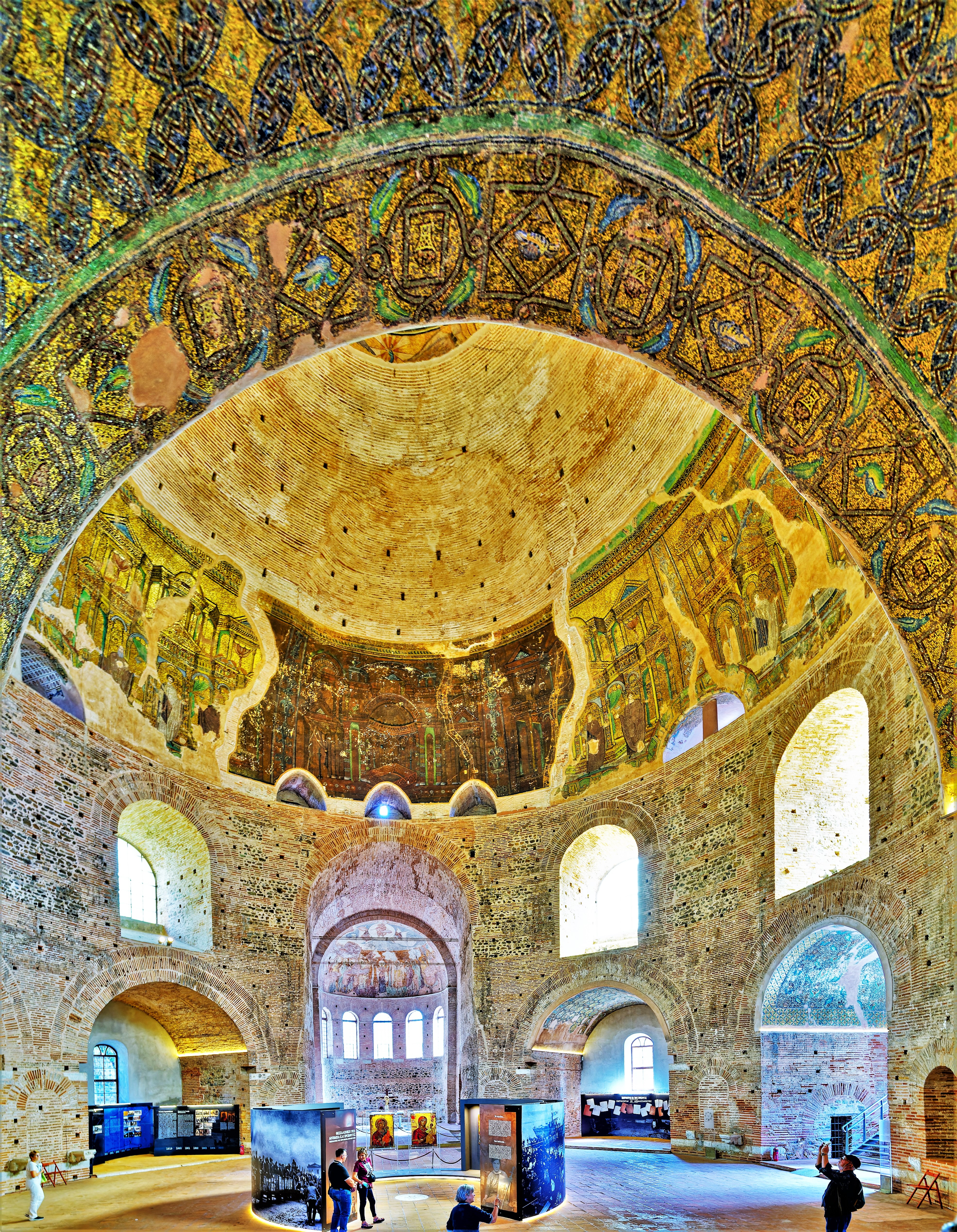
The Rotunda

=== Italy ===
- Aquileia, Baths (Grandi Terme)
- Aquileia, Basilica di Santa Maria Assunta, (Basilica Patriarcale) — mosaic floor, signature of Petrus.
- Florence, Floor mosaics of Santa Reparata, Santa Maria del Fiore (4th–5th century)
- Milan, Basilica of San Lorenzo, Chapel of S. Aquilino (it)
- Milan, Basilica of Sant'Ambrogio — mosaic of the lamb
- Naples, Baptistery of San Giovanni in Fonte (4th–5th century)
- Rome, Catacombs of Domitilla — are mentioned mosaic of the raising of Lazarus, the three Hebrews in the Fiery Furnace and Christ enthroned between Peter and Paul
- Rome, Church of Santa Costanza (Mausoleum of Constantina), (340—345)
- Rome, Via Livenza Hypogeum (nymphaeum), Rome — fragment of mosaic appearing to show St Peter striking water from a rock.
- Rome, Opus sectile mosaics from the Basilica of Junius Bassus, now in Palazzo Massimo alle Terme
- Piazza Armerina (Sicily), Villa Romana del Casale
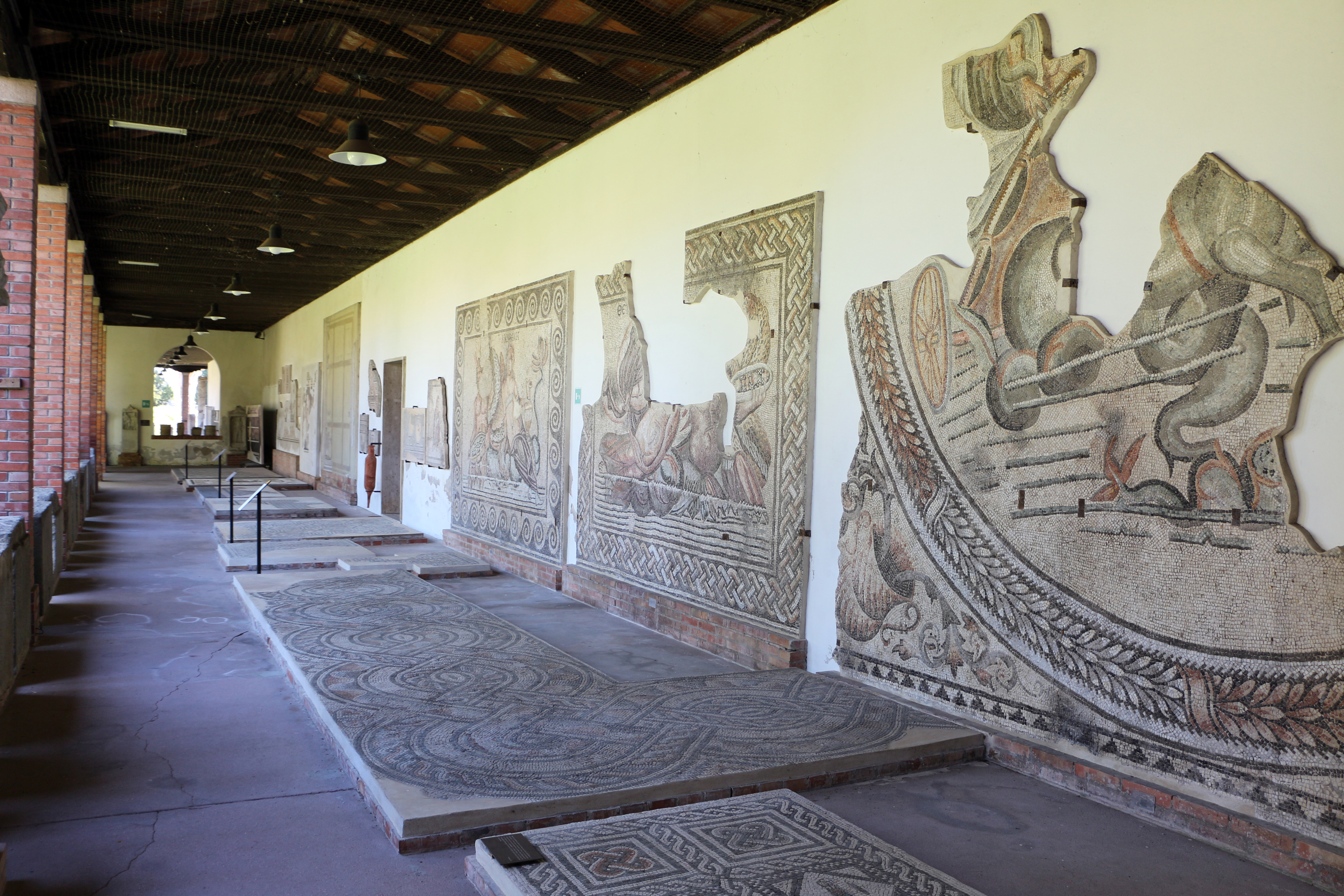
Mosaics from Grandi Terme, Aquileia

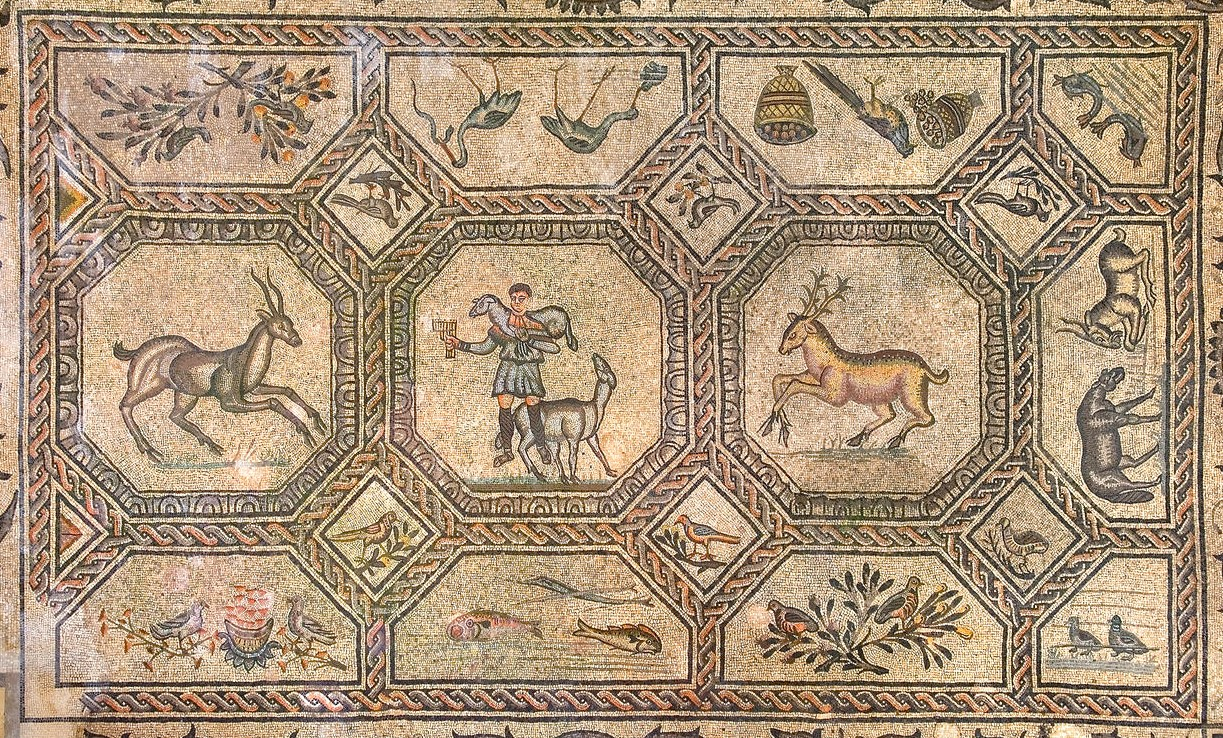
Basilica di Santa Maria Assunta, Aquileia

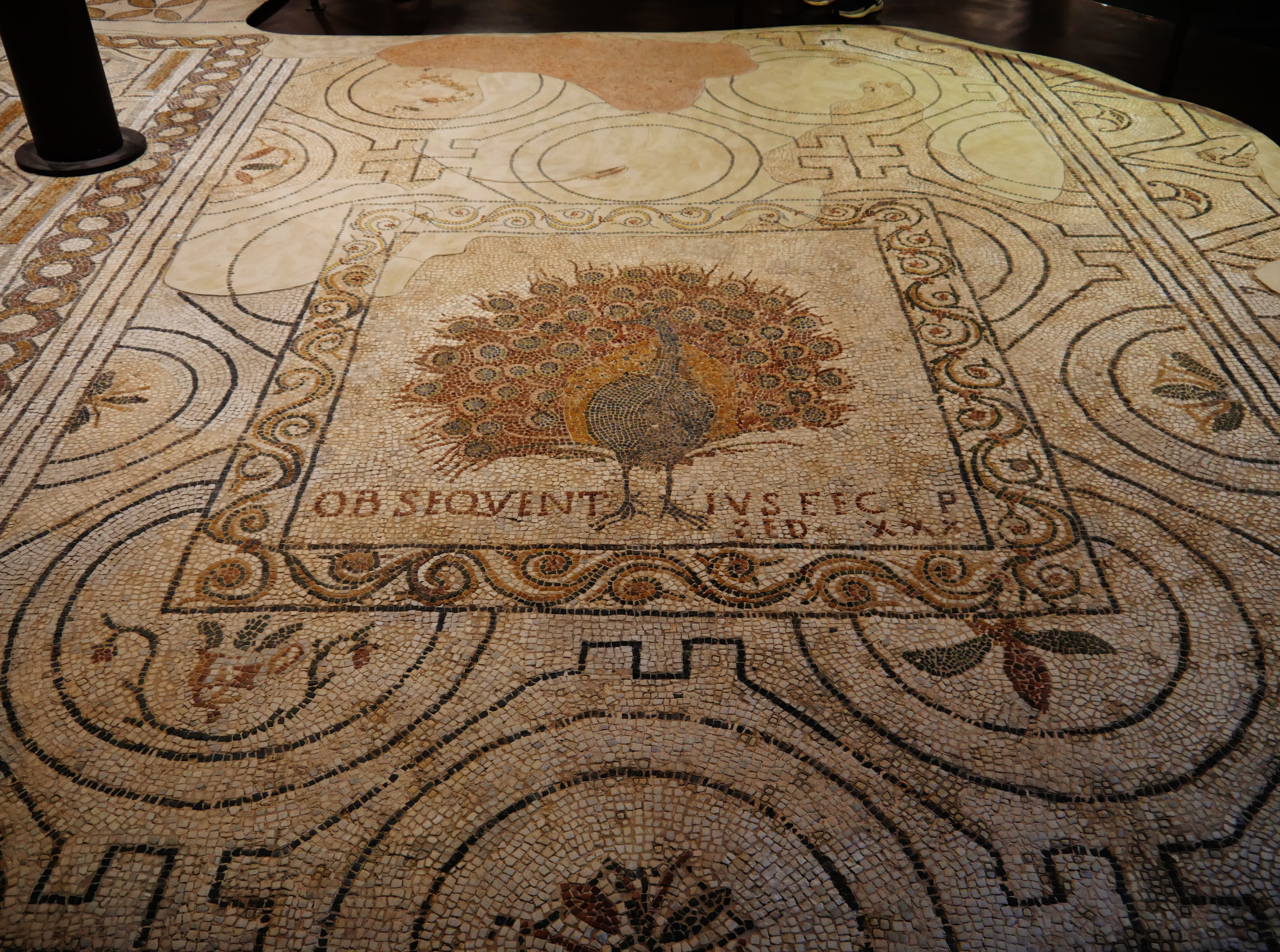
Santa Reparata

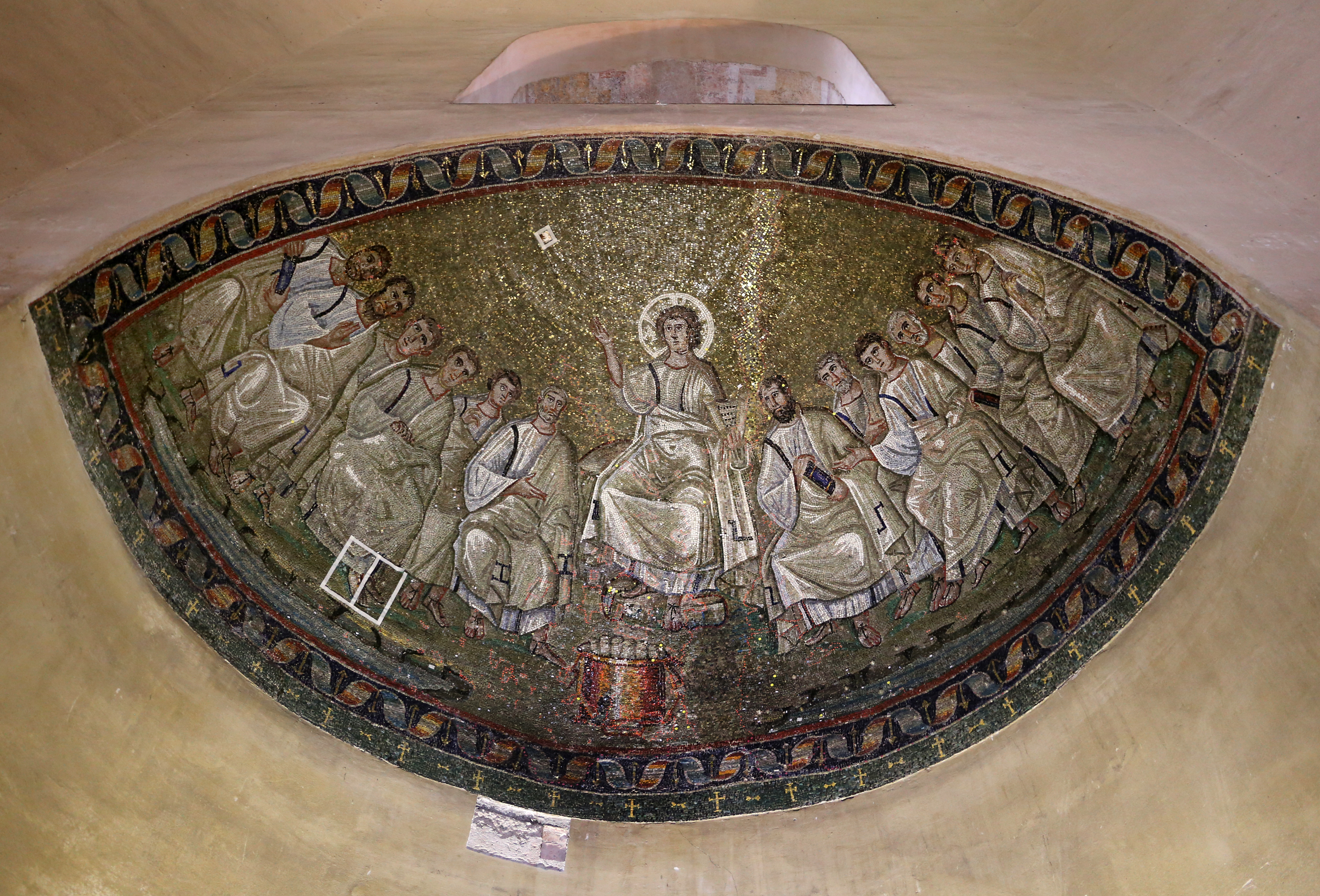
Chapel of S. Aquilino in Basilica of San Lorenzo, Milan

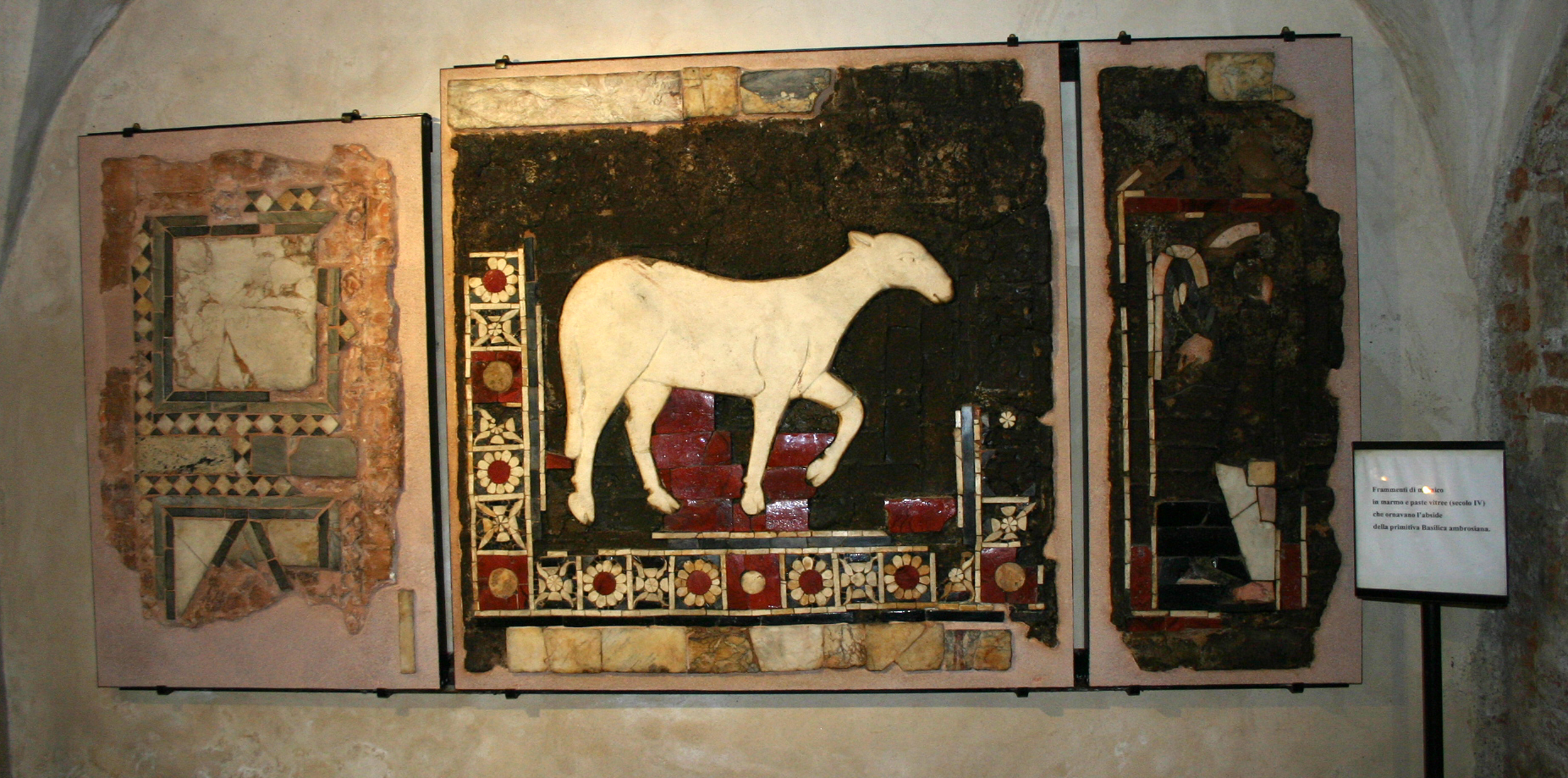
Sant'Ambrogio (Milan)

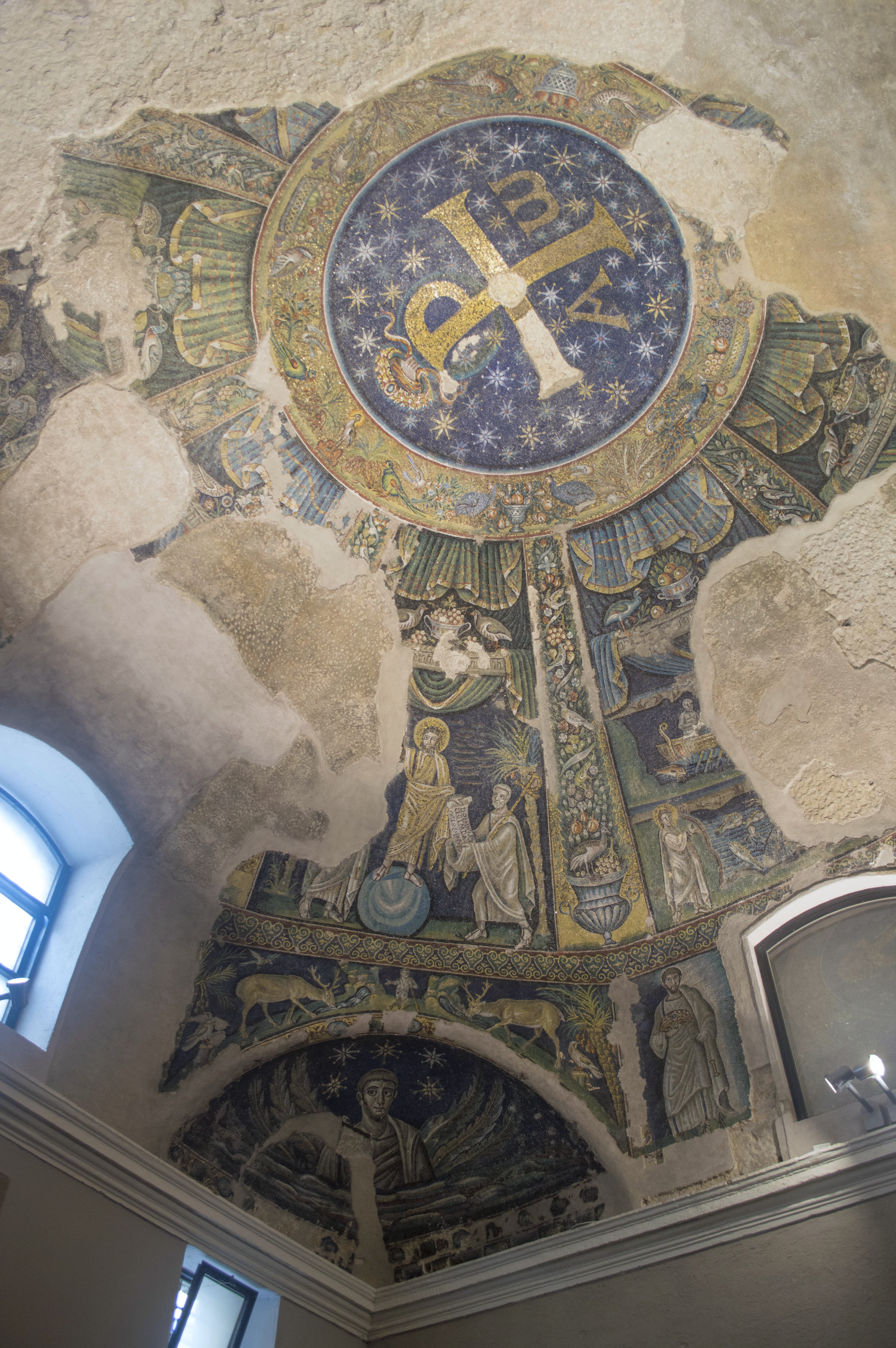
Baptistery of San Giovanni in Fonte, Naples

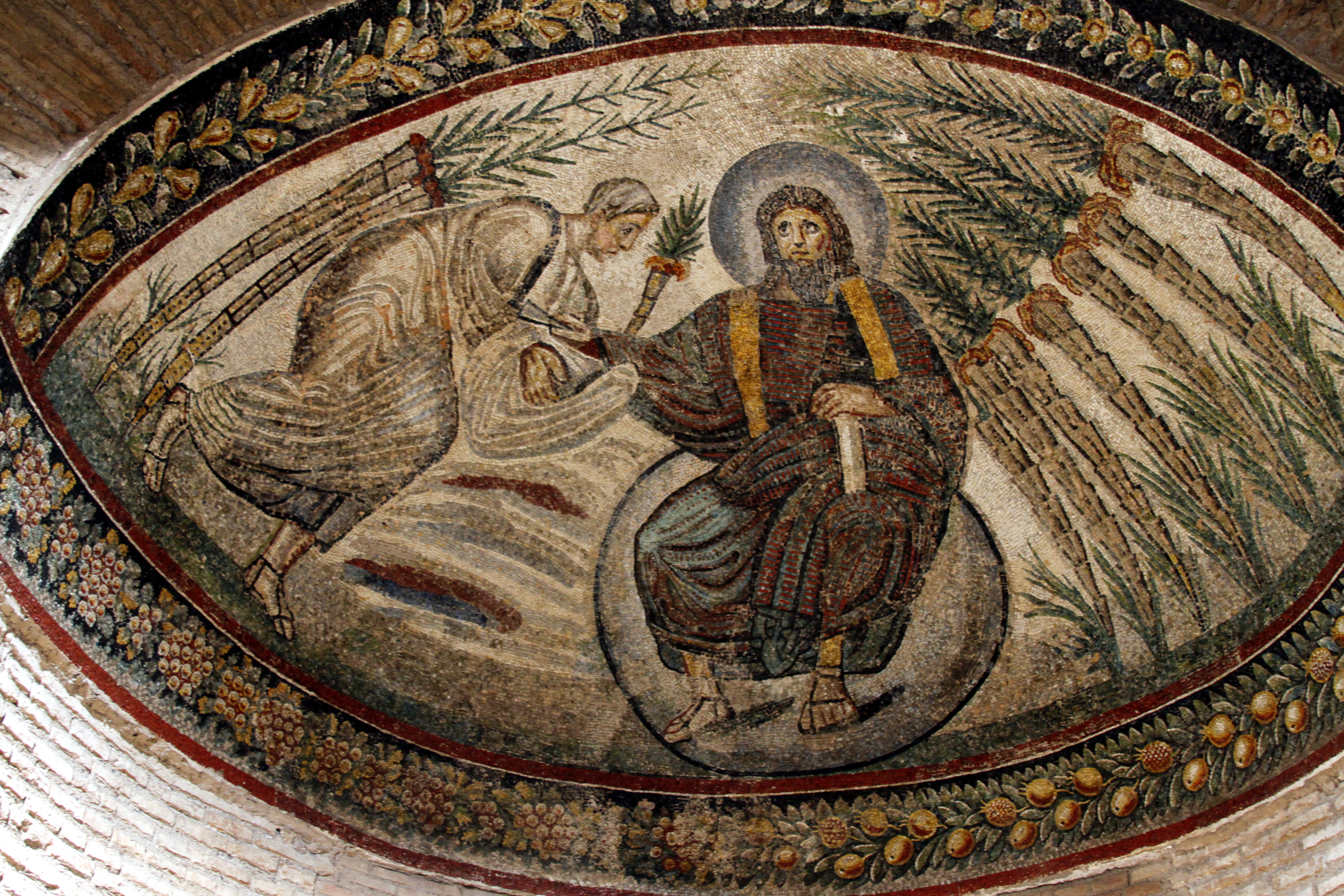
Santa Costanza

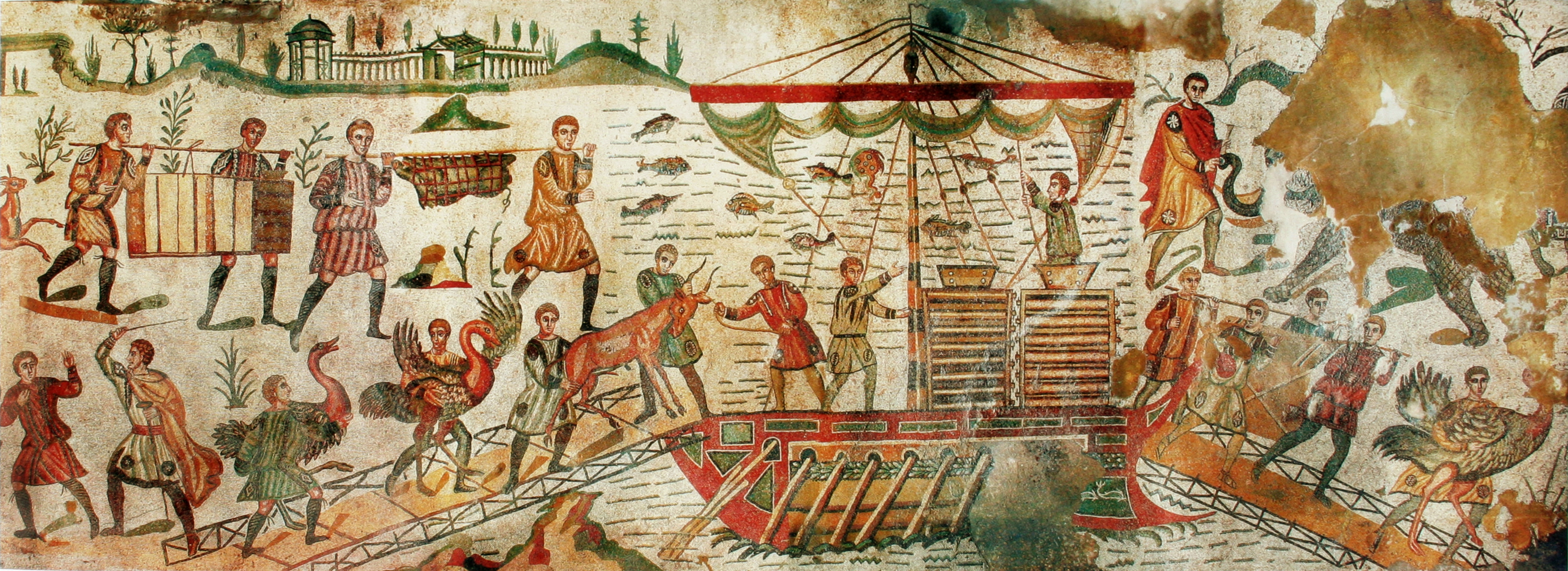
Villa Romana del Casale

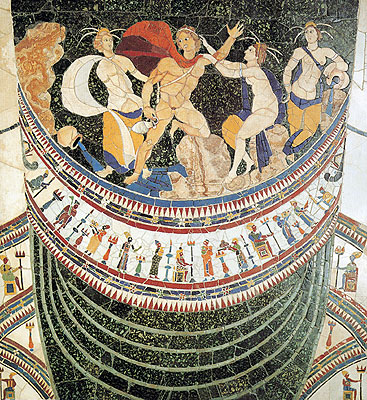
Basilica of Junius Bassus

=== Levant and North Africa ===
- Al-Eizariya, Bethany (Palestine), Church of Saint Lazarus (4th–5th)
- Gaza Strip, Palestine, «Bureij mosaic» (between AD 390 and 634—636) — possibly destroyed
- Jewish mosaics: Tiberias (Israel), Hammat Tiberias synagogue floors
- Tel Megiddo (Israel), Megiddo church (Israel) (230 — before 304) — floors
- Umm al-Surab (Jordan), Church of SS. Sergios and Backhos, (4th–5th)
- «Asarotos oikos» mosaic from Lebanon, now in Château de Boudry, Switzerland
- «Dominus Julius mosaic» in the Bardo National Museum, Tunis
- «Daniel in the lions' den mosaic» in the Bardo National Museum
- «Lod Mosaic», now in Shelby White and Leon Levy Lod Mosaic Archaeological Center (Israel)
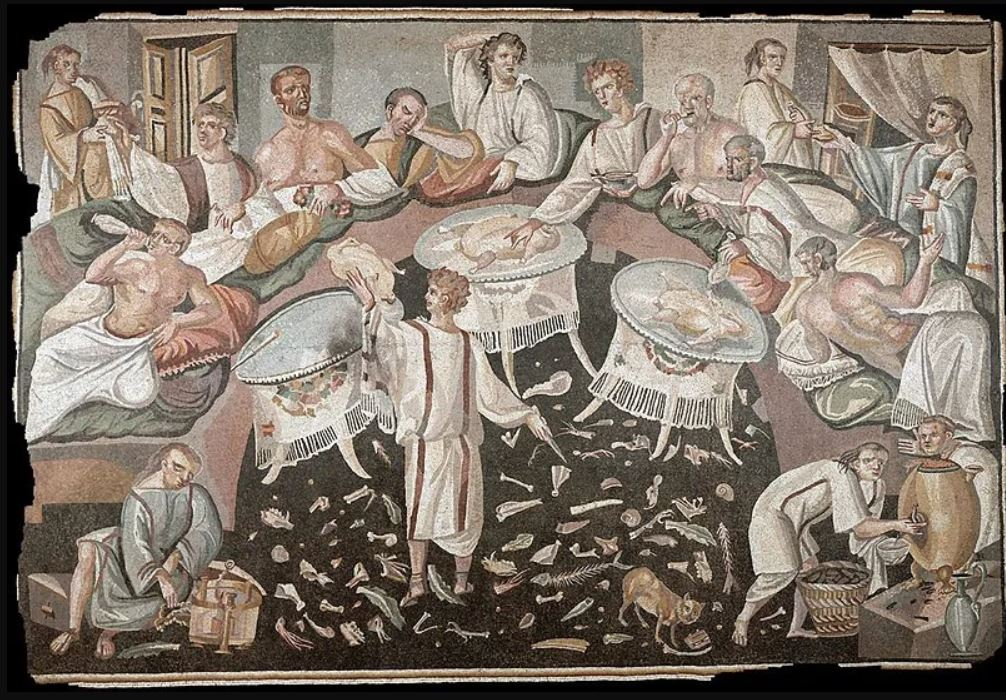
Château de Boudry

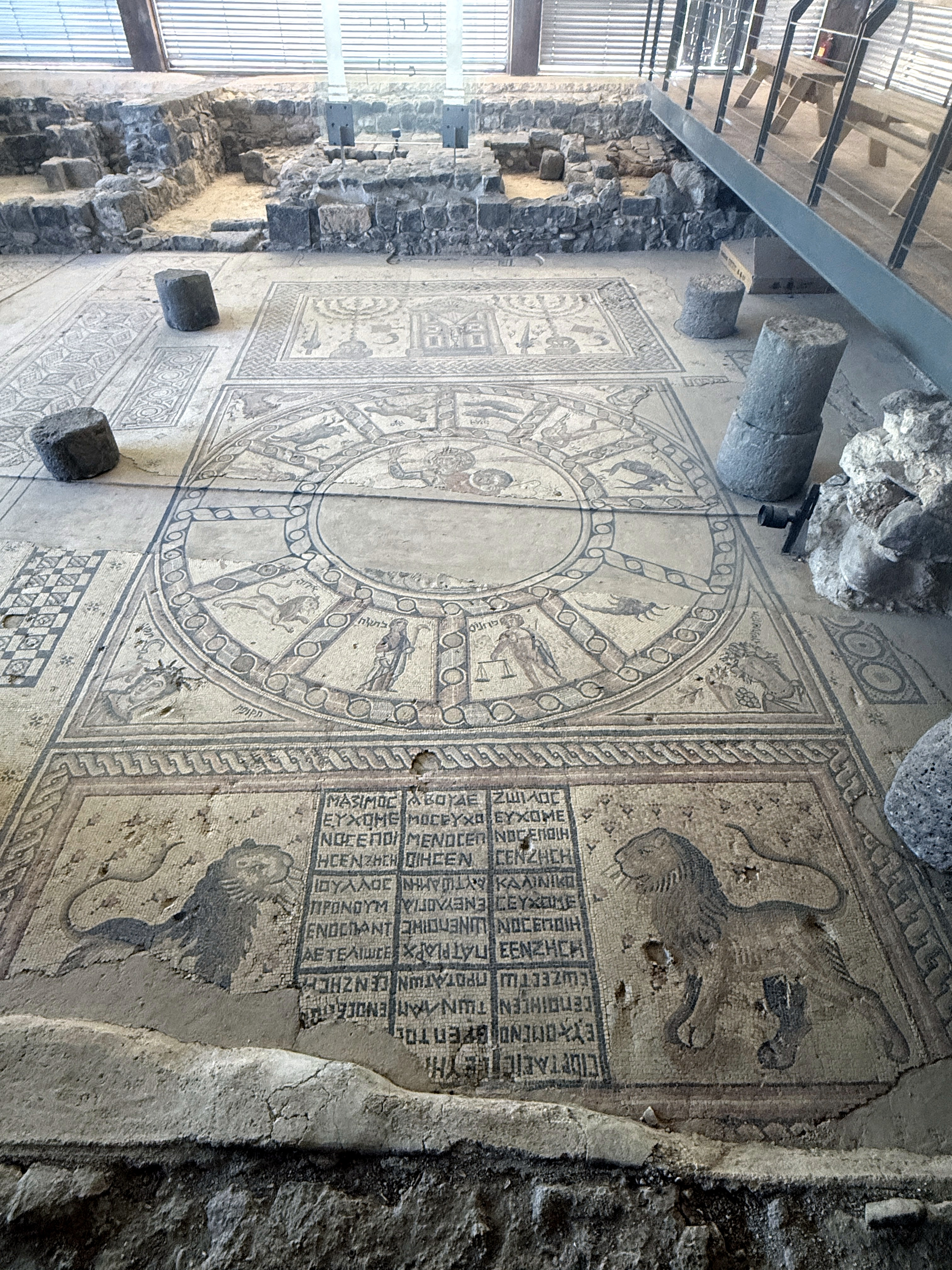
Hammat Tiberias

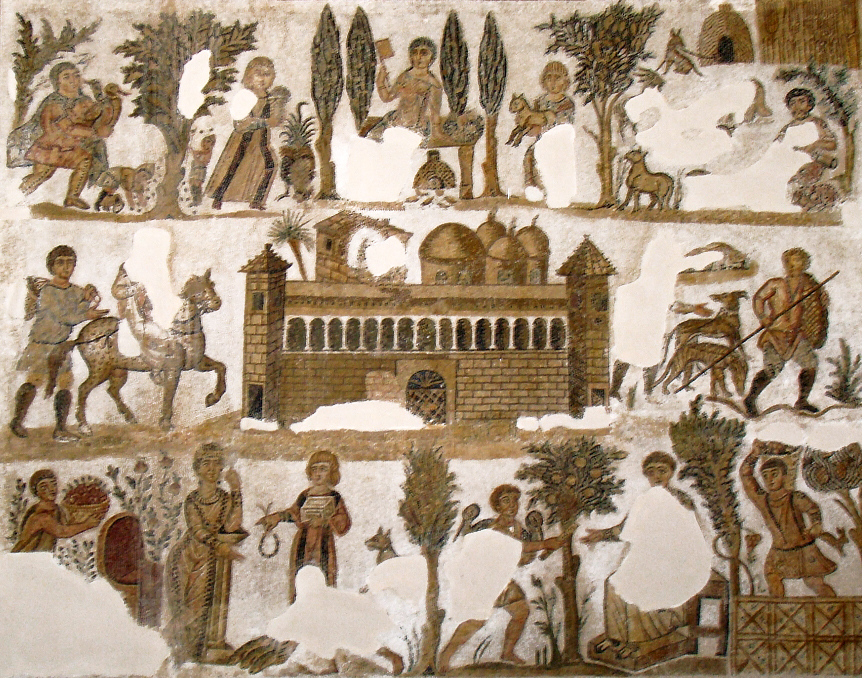
Dominus Julius mosaic

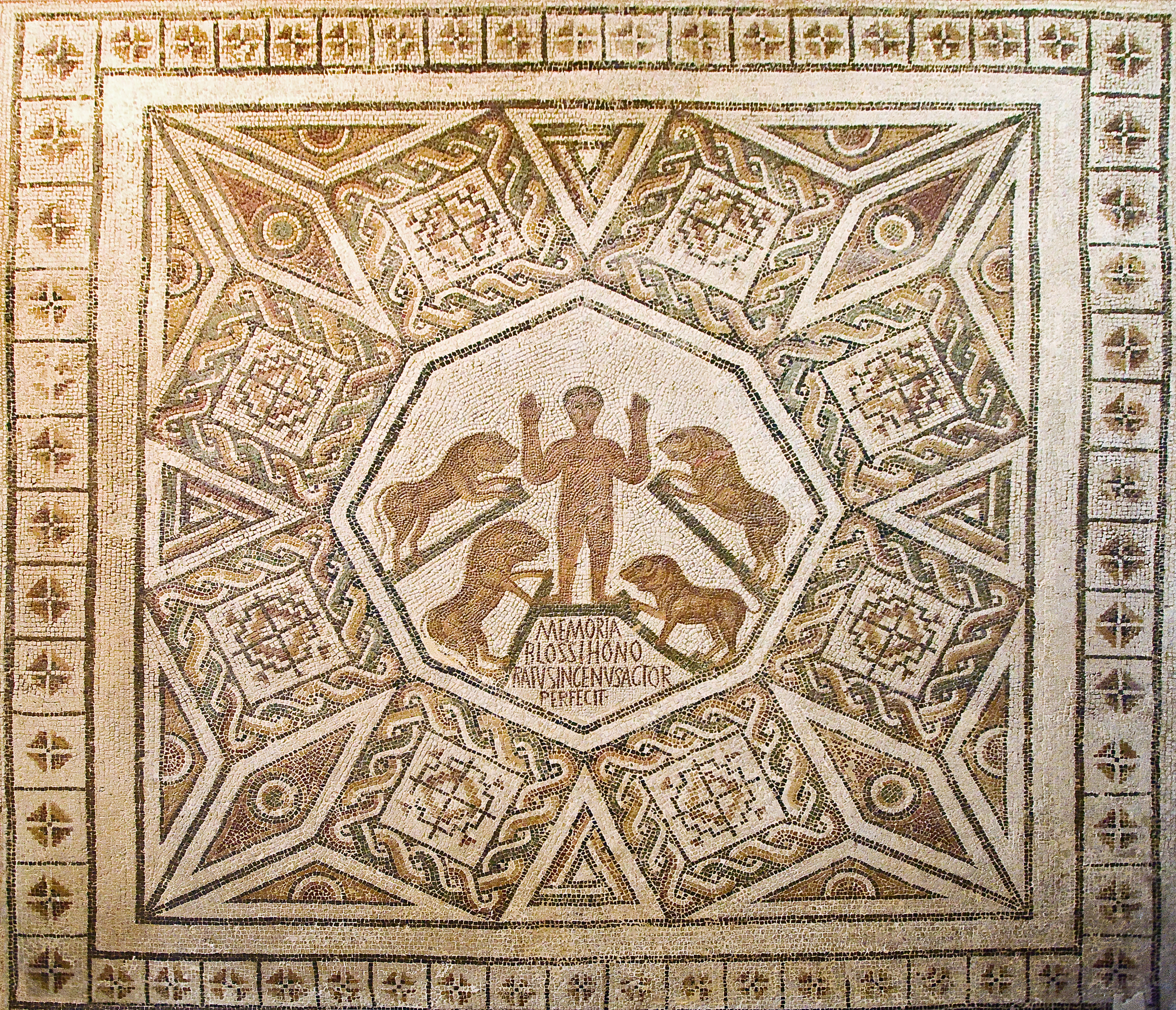
Daniel in the lions' den

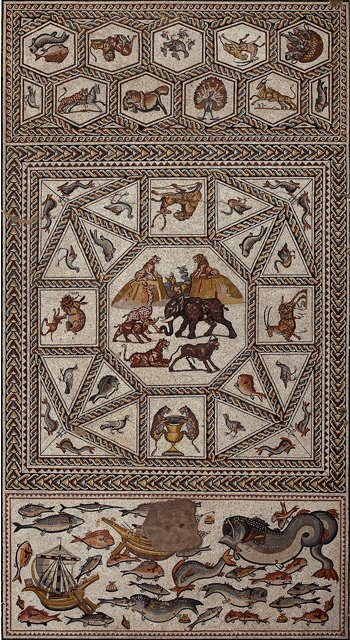
Lod Mosaic

=== Serbia ===
- Felix Romuliana (Gamzigrad), Mausolea of Galerius and of Romula

=== Spain ===
- Centcelles (Taragona), Roman villa of Centcelles
- Mosaics from Complutum, Museo Arqueológico y Paleontológico de la Comunidad de Madrid
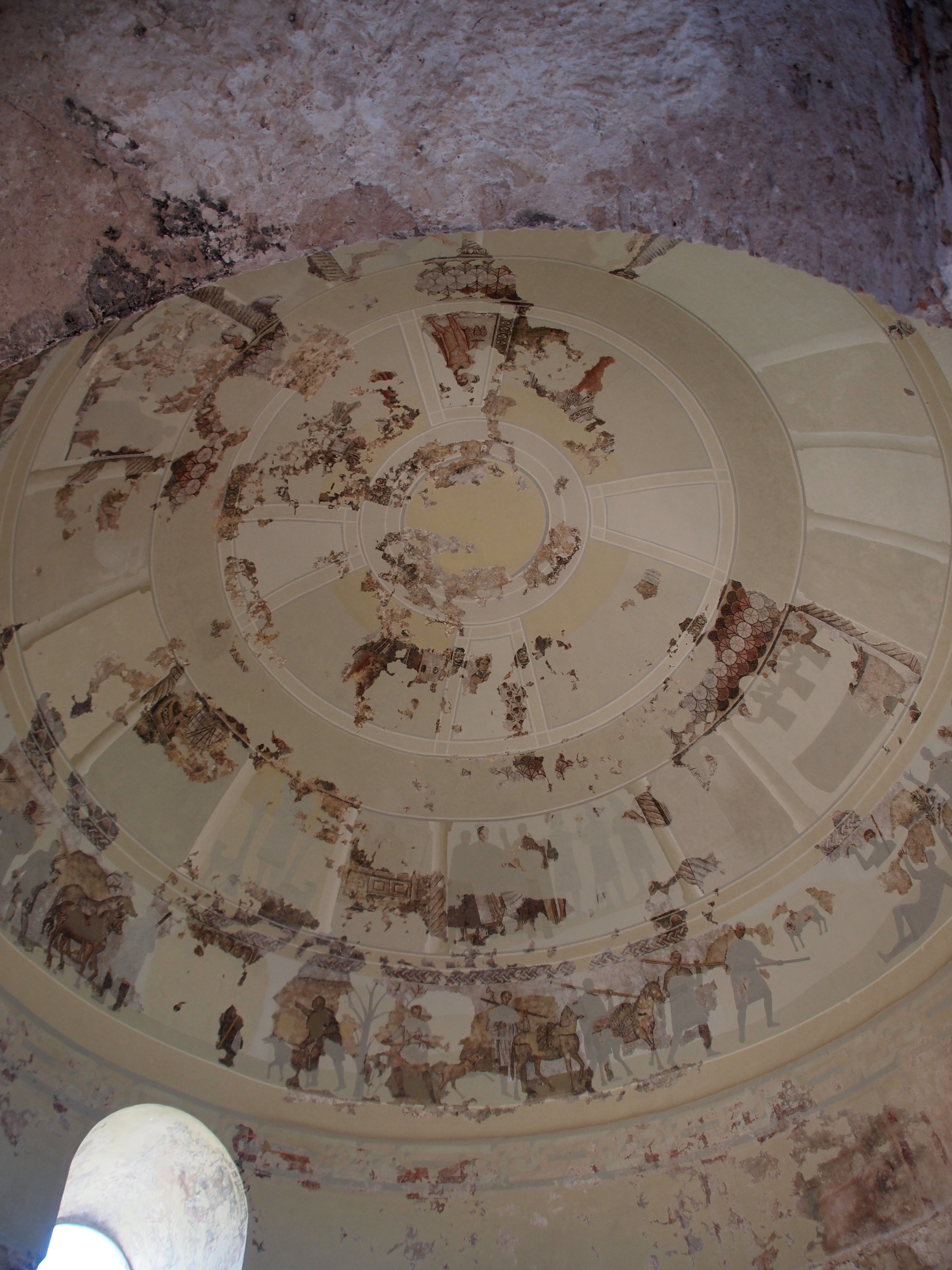

=== Turkey ===
- Istanbul, Mosaics of the Great Palace of Constantinople, Great Palace Mosaic Museum (4th–6th)
- Istanbul, «Dionysus mosaic, Samatya»
- Misis, Adana, «Noah’s Ark mosaic» floor, now in Misis Mosaic Museum
- Trabzon, Church of Theotokos Chrysokephalos / Fatih Mosque — floor
- «Seasons mosaics» (Louvre, Ma 3444). Found in Daphne (now Antakya, Turkey).
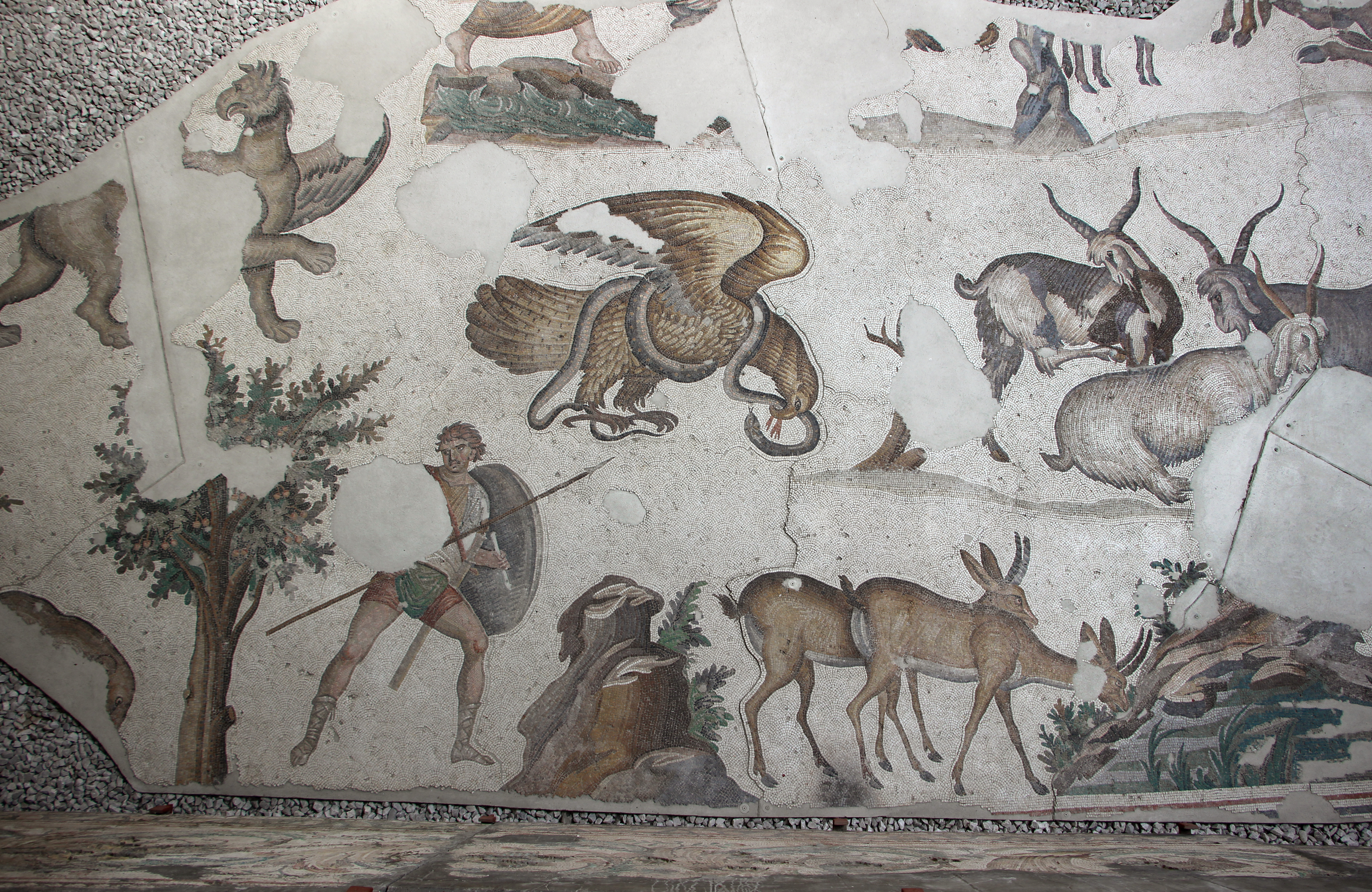
Great Palace of Constantinople

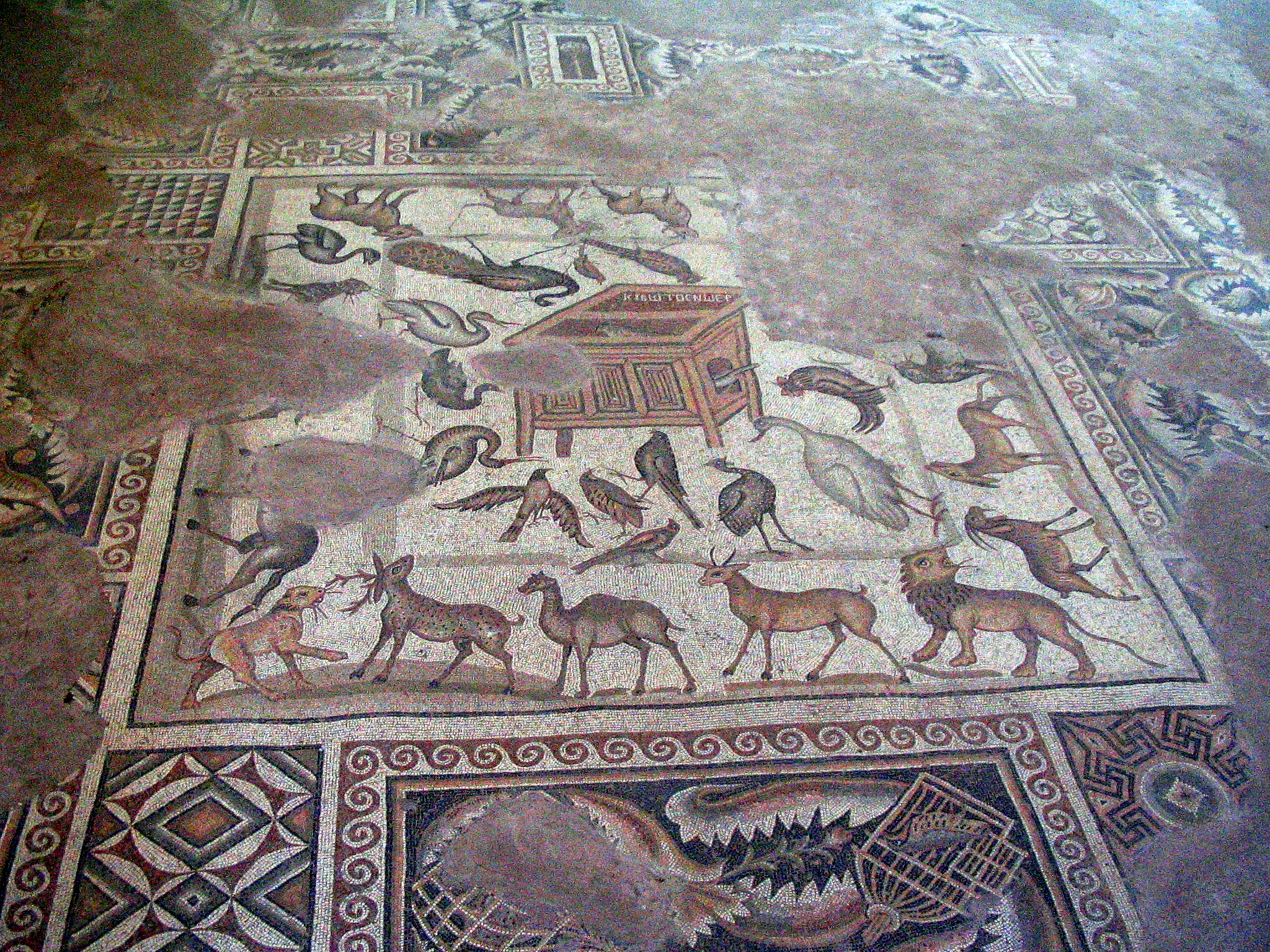
Misis

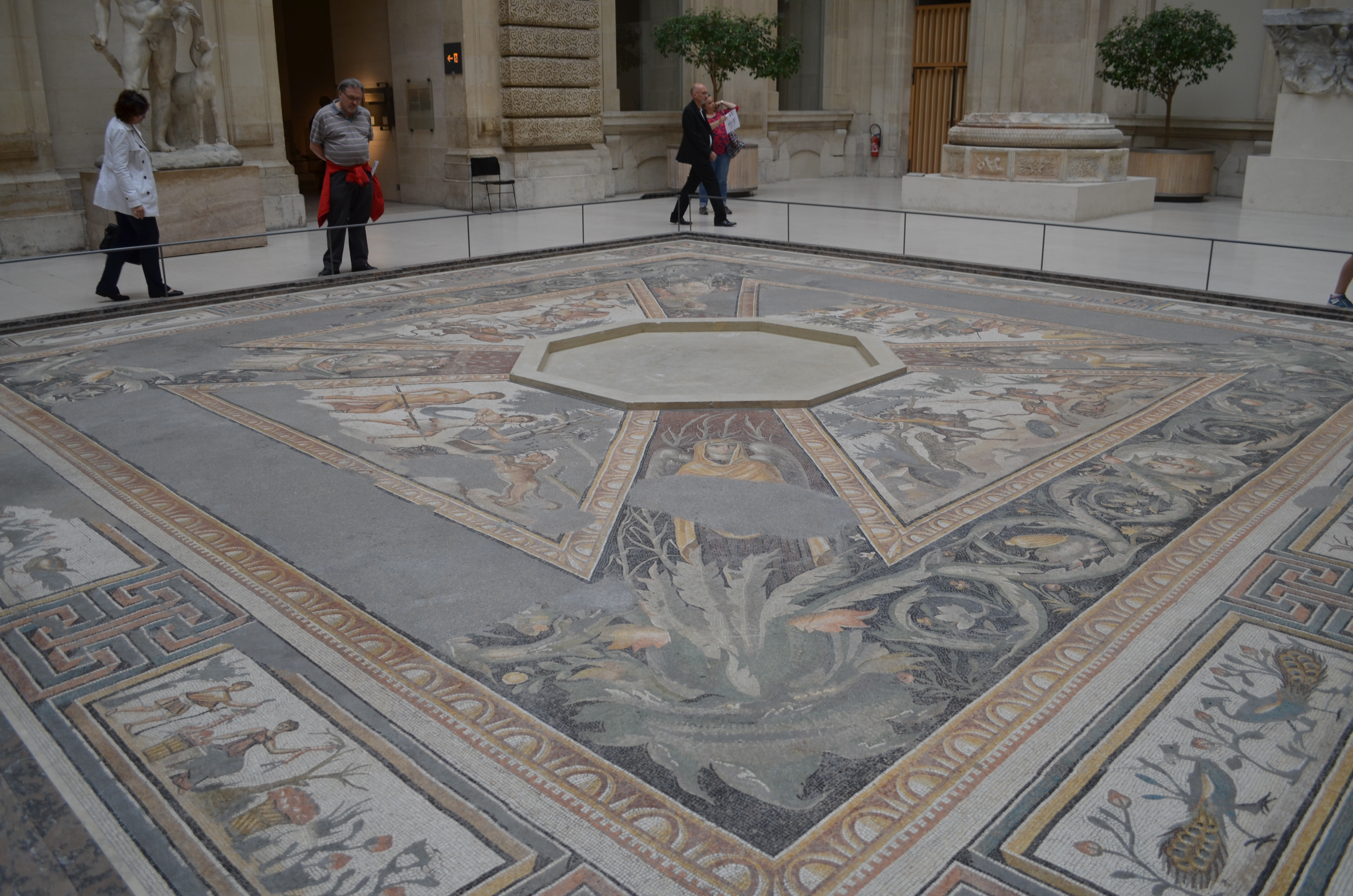
Louvre

== 5th century ==
=== Greece ===
- Analipsi on Astypalaia, mosaic in Maltezana. Christ Pantokrator is portrayed as Helios middle of the zodiac. Zodiac is surrounded by waves Oсean and the seasons.
- Nikopolis, Epiros, Basilica B (5th–6th)
- Philippi, Octagonal church complex (5th–6th)
- Thessaloniki, Church of the Acheiropoietos — Arches in colonnades and in south gallery and narthex vaults; tribelon and west wall window.
- Thessaloniki, Hagios Demetrios — some 5th century fragments: Saint Demetrius with a youth being brought to him (Demetrius is depicted in the pose of an orant, his palms are covered with gold smalt), Saint Demetrius and two angels
- Thessaloniki, Church of Hosios David (Moni Latomou / Monastery of Latomos) — Mosaic of Christ of Latomos (5th–7th)
- Thessaloniki , Galerian Complex, Arched Hall / Apsidal Hall (Hall in Gounares Street) (5th–6th)
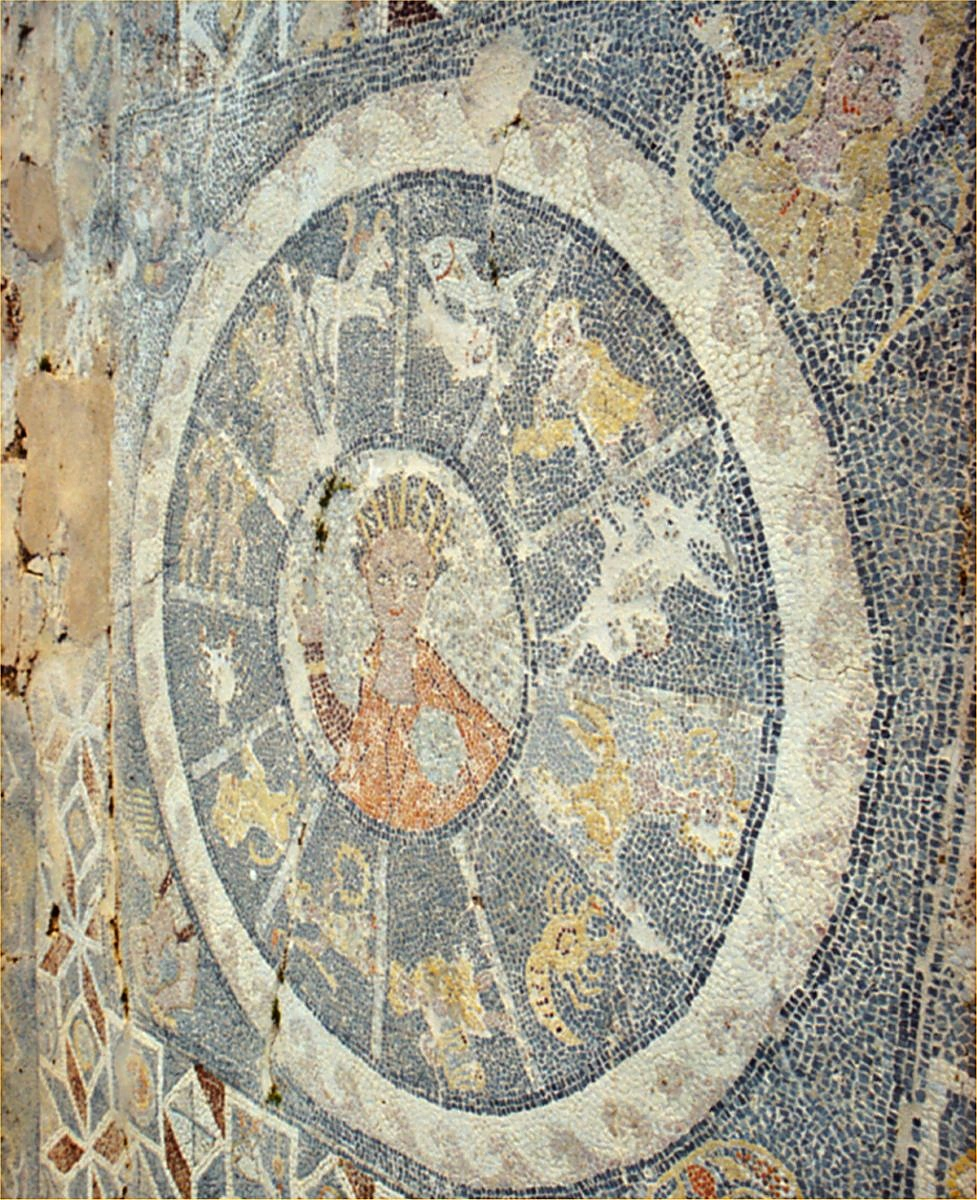
Astypalaia

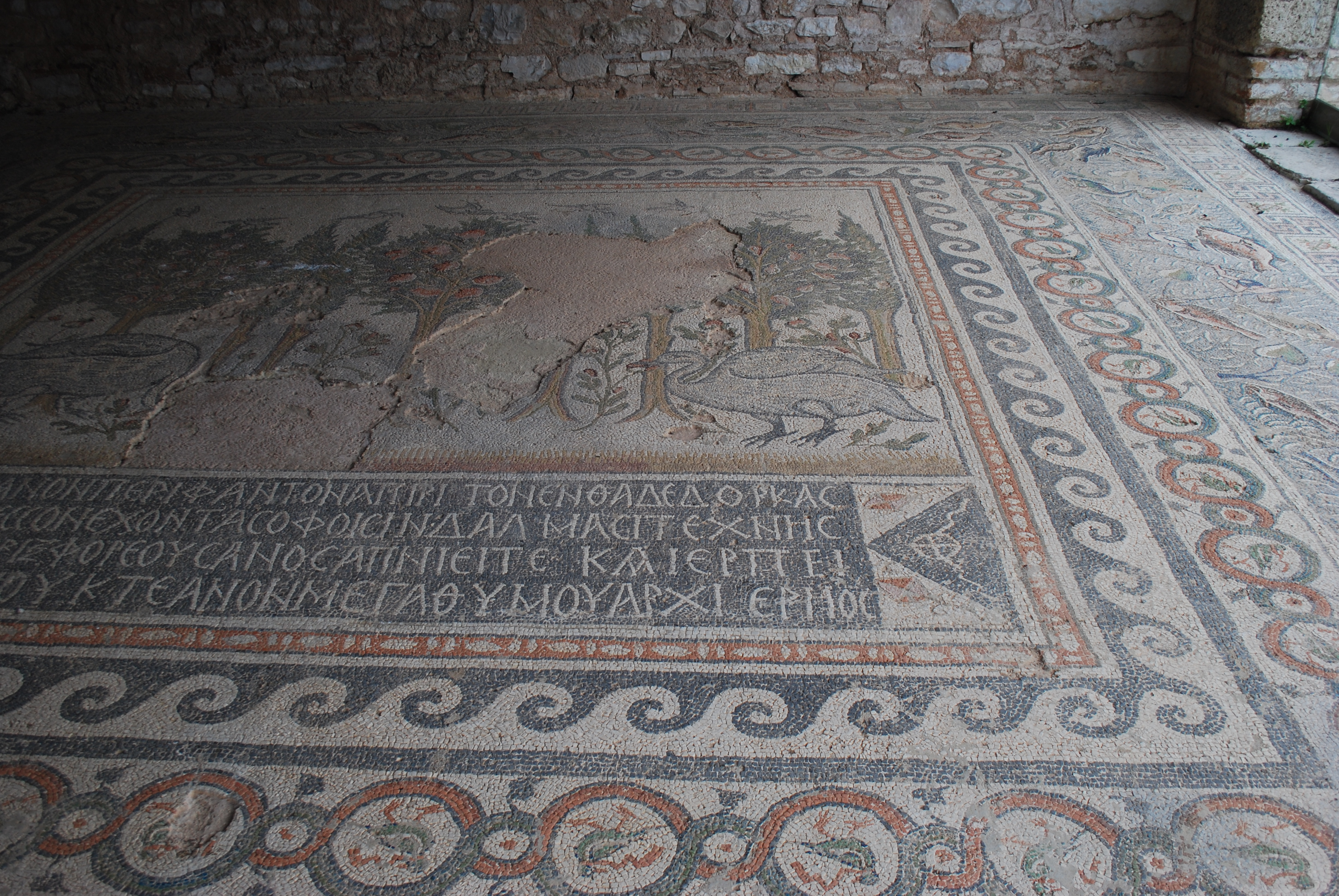
Nicopolis

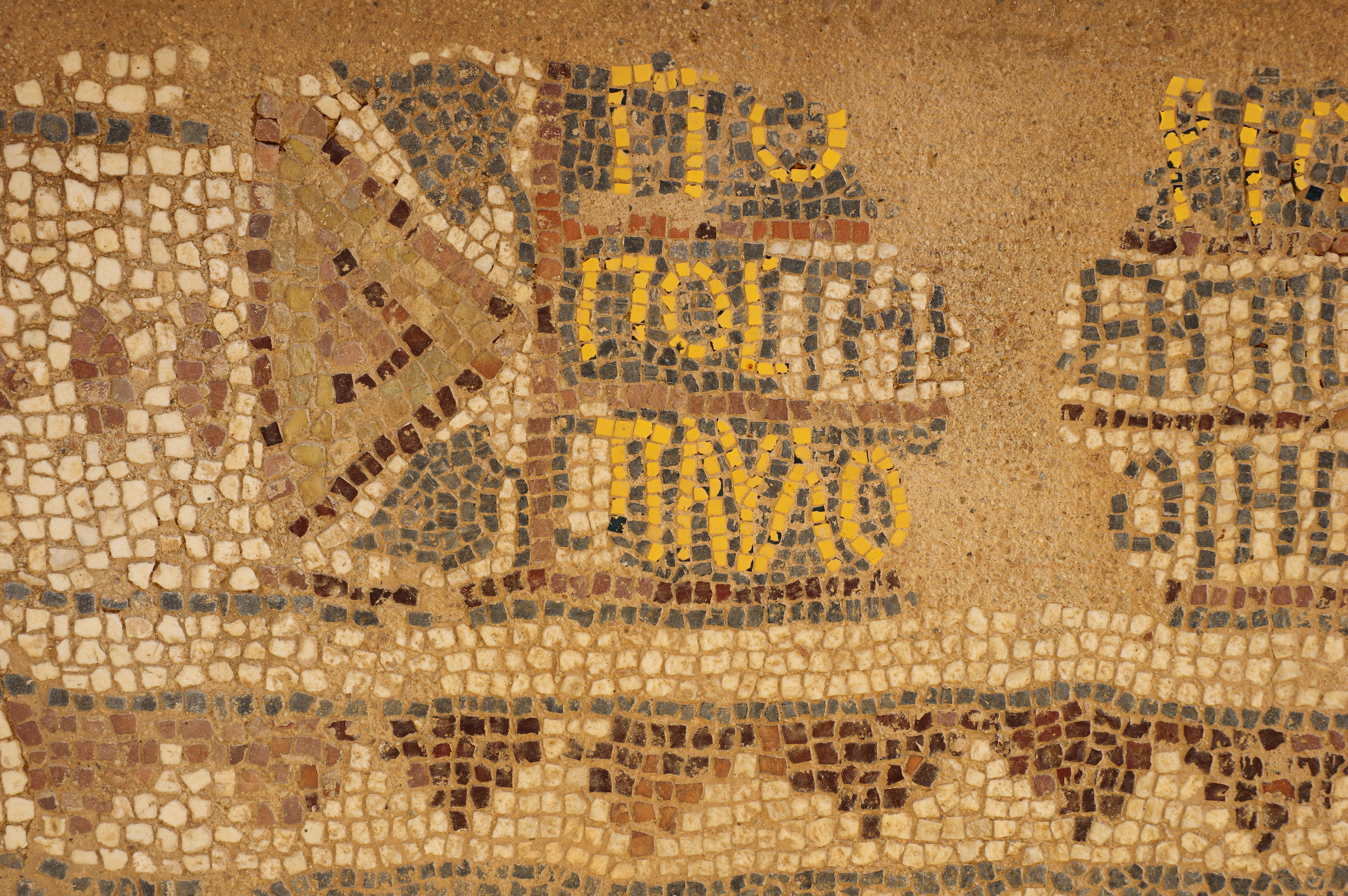
Philippi

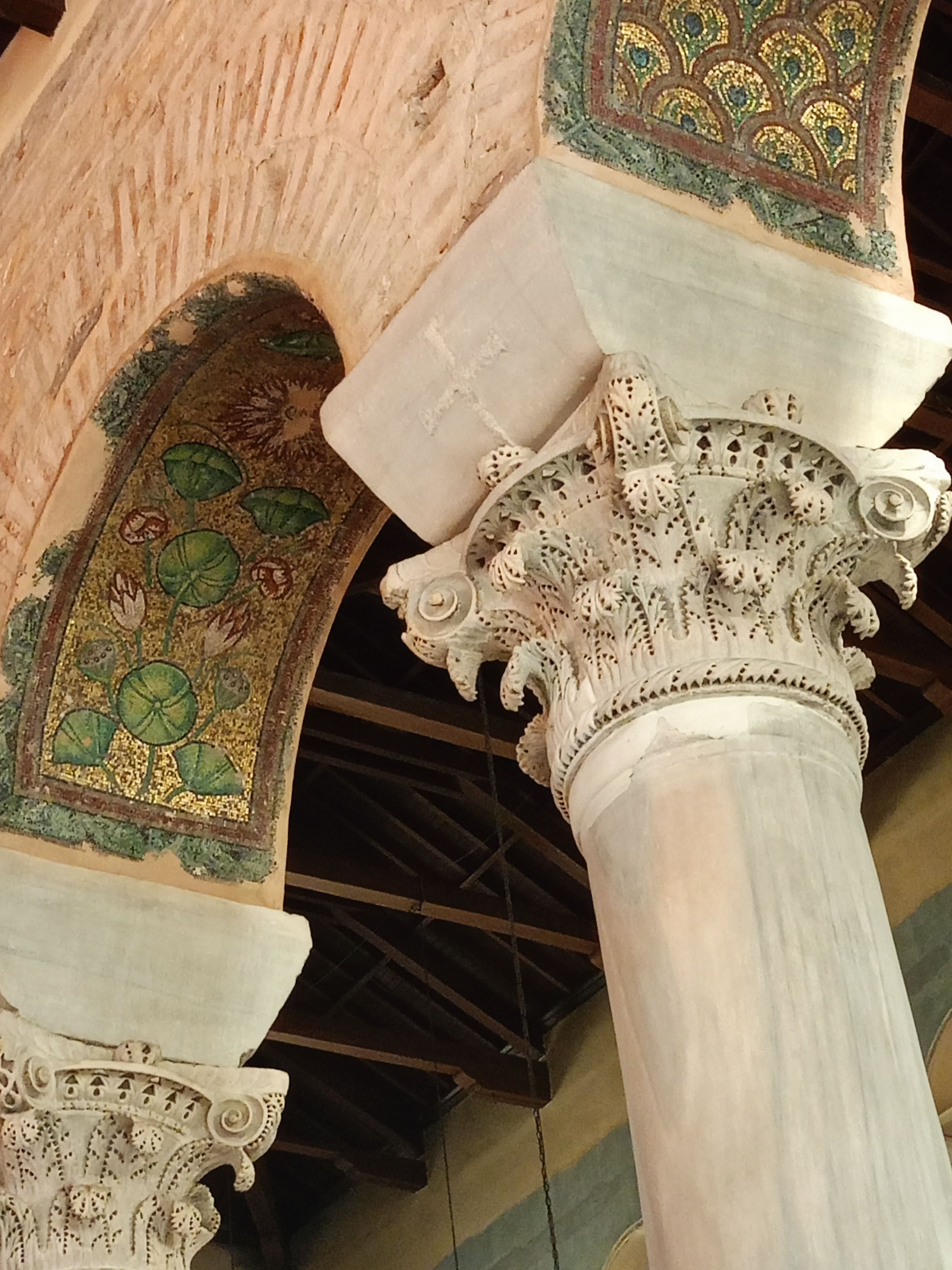
Church of the Acheiropoietos

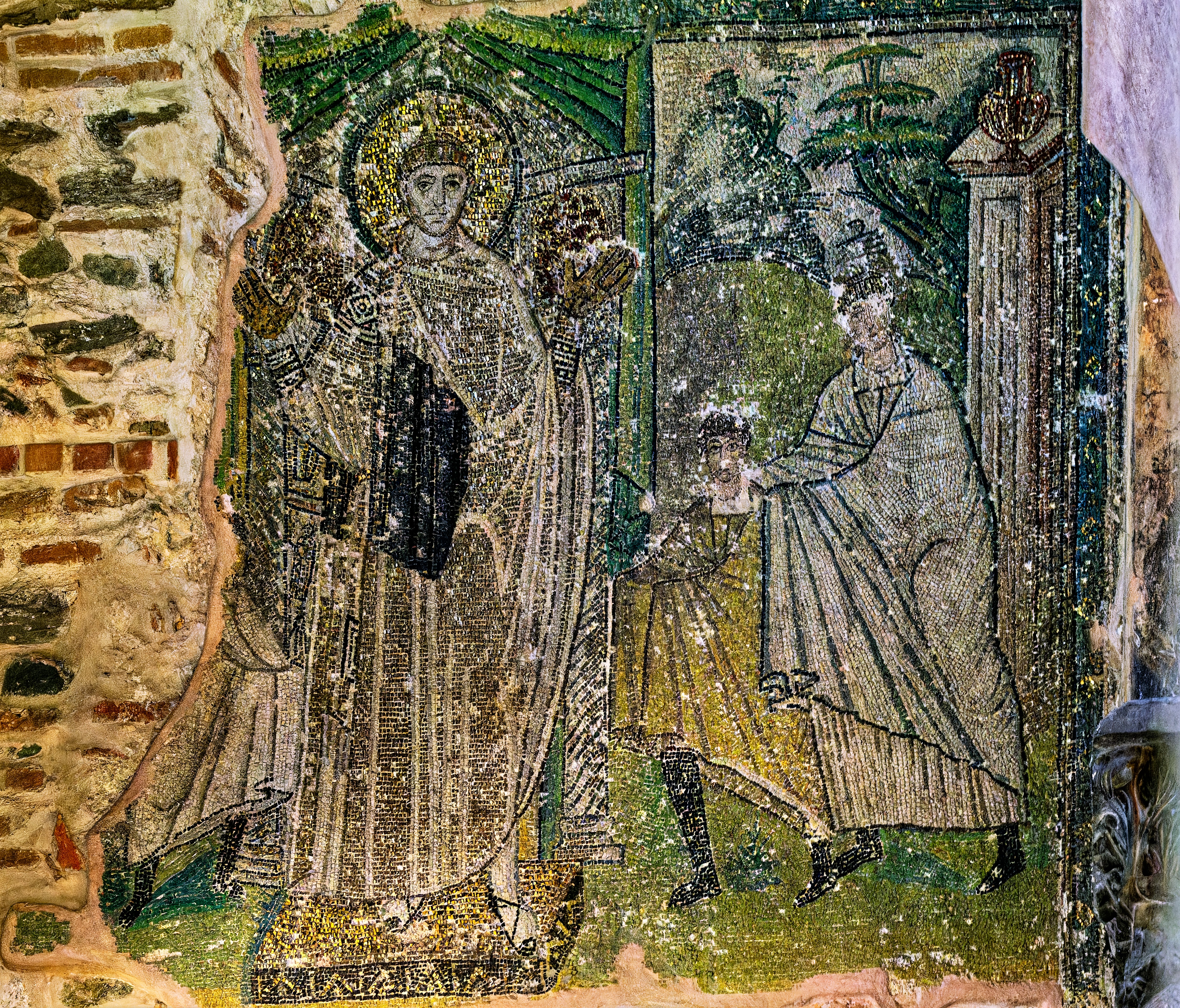
Hagios Demetrios

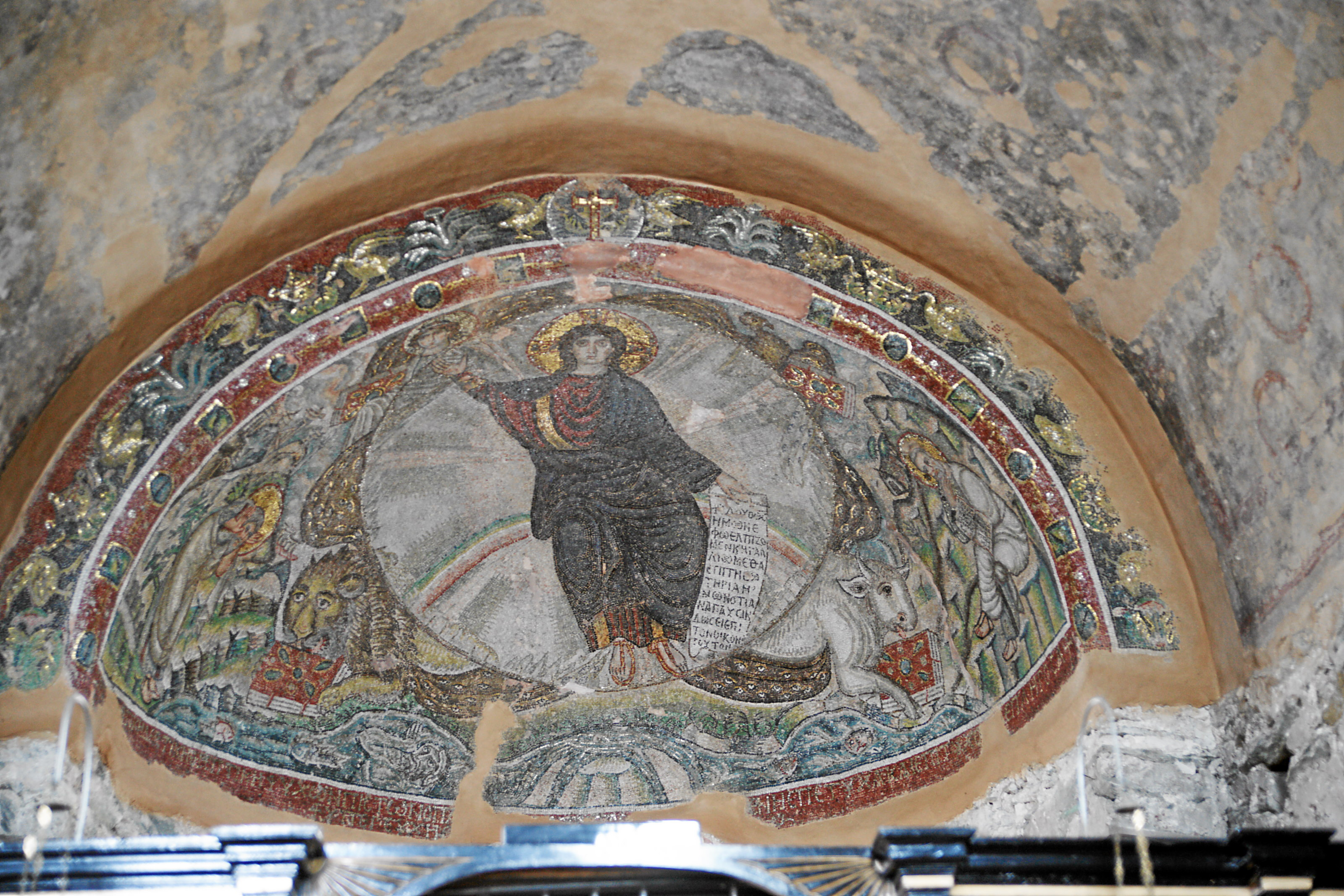
Hosios David

=== Italy ===
- Casaranello, Santa Maria della Croce (Chiesa di Santa Maria della Croce)
- Cimitile, Church of S. Felice of Nola (it:Basiliche paleocristiane di Cimitile) (5th–6th)
- Lucera, San Giusto di Lucera
- Milan, Basilica di Sant’Ambrogio, Chapel San Vittore in ciel d’oro (it), (4–5th century)
- Naples, Catacombs of Saint Gaudiosus
- Naples, Catacombs of San Gennaro, portraits of bishops in Bishops' crypt
- San Prisco (ancient Capua), Chapel of Santa Matrona, Chiesa di Santa Croce e San Prisco (5th–6th)
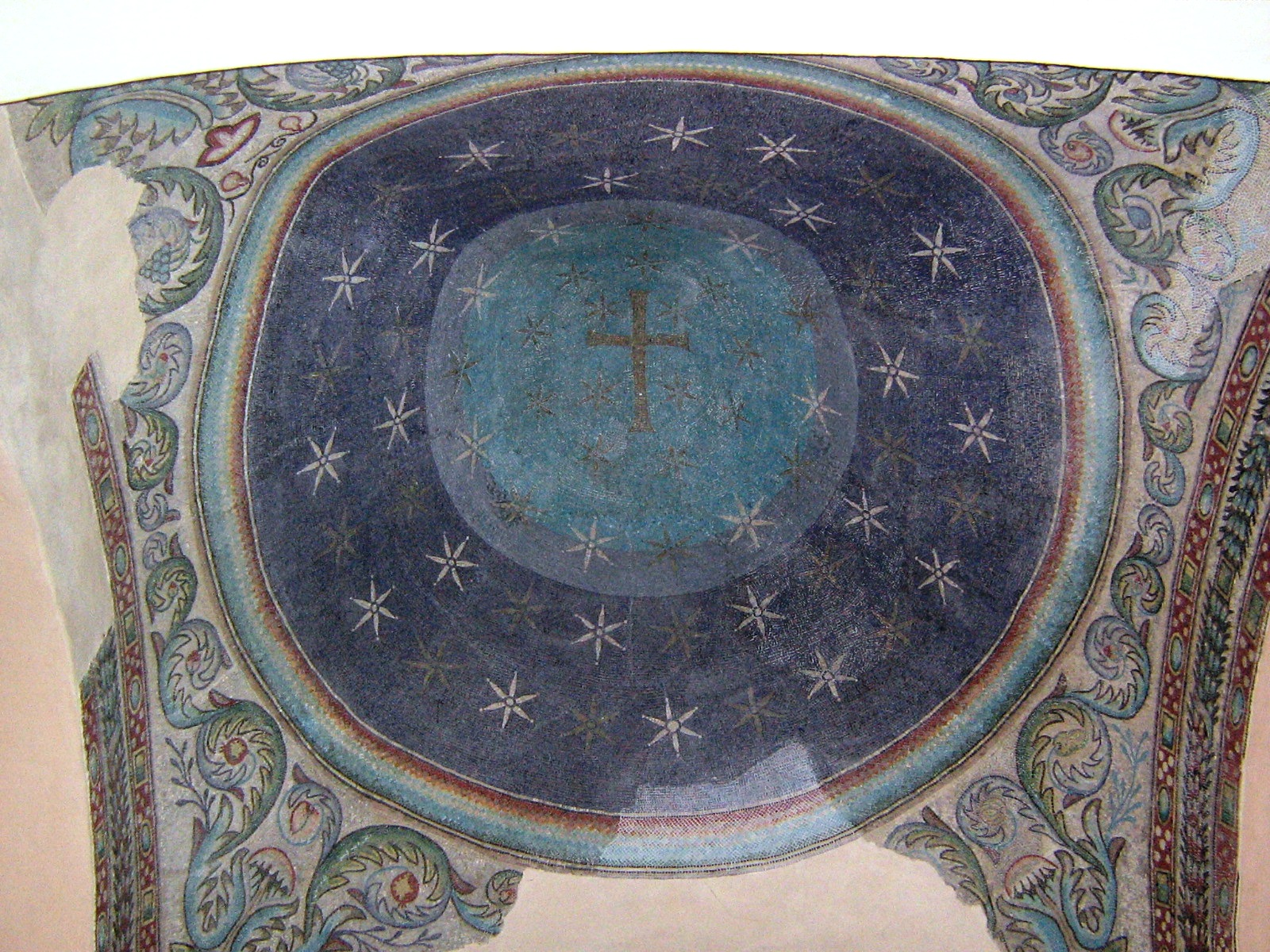
Casaranello

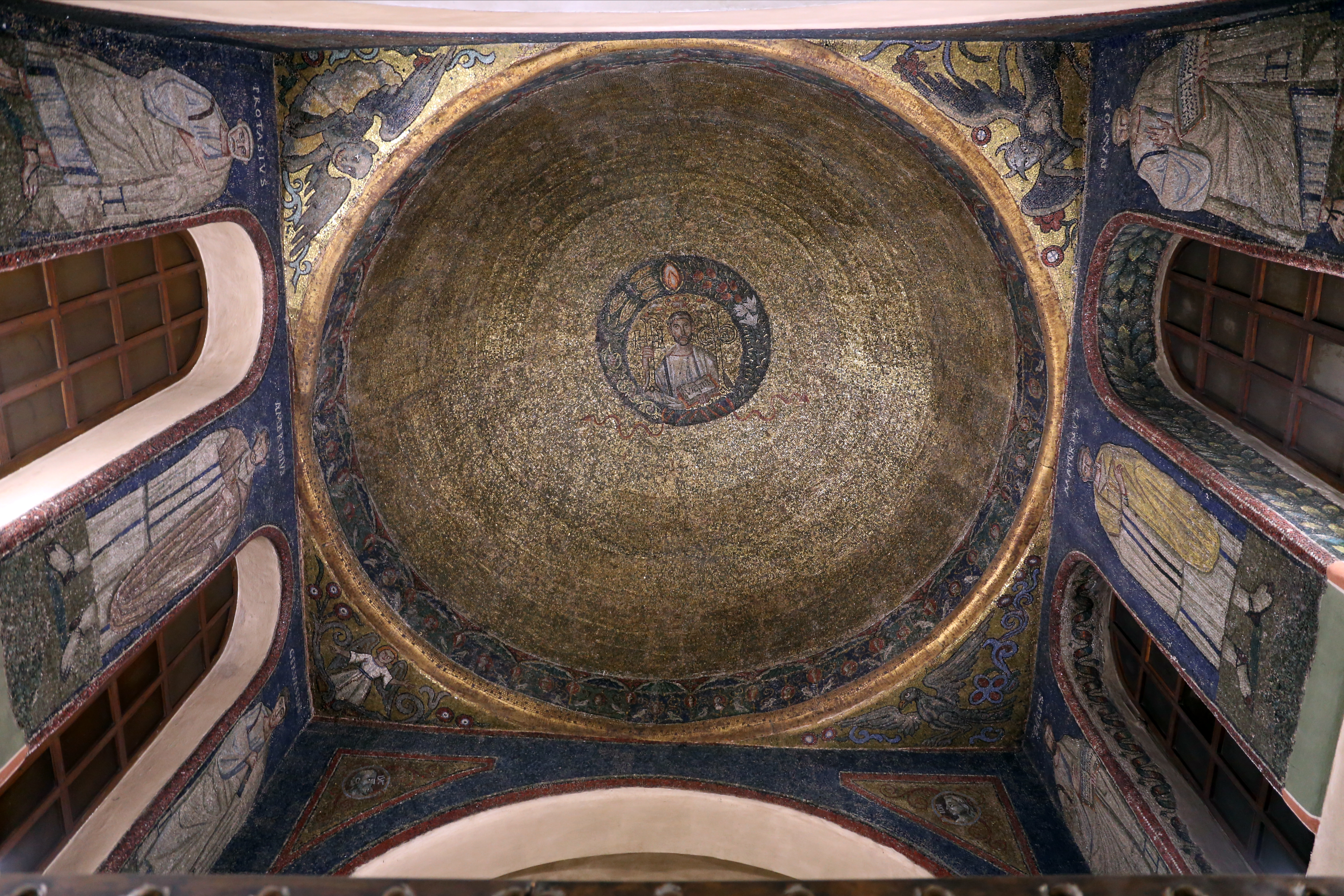
San Vittore in ciel d'oro

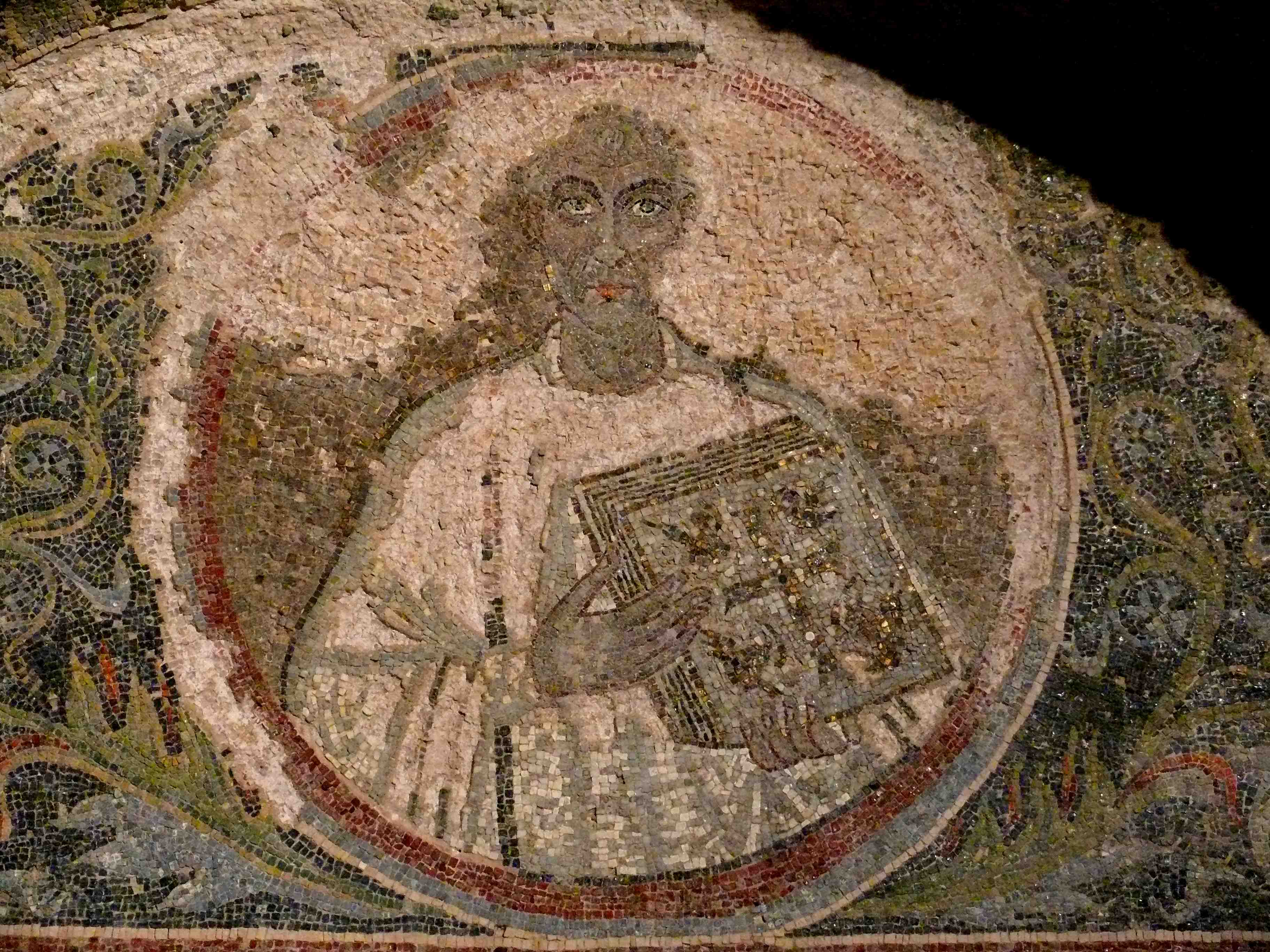
San Gennaro

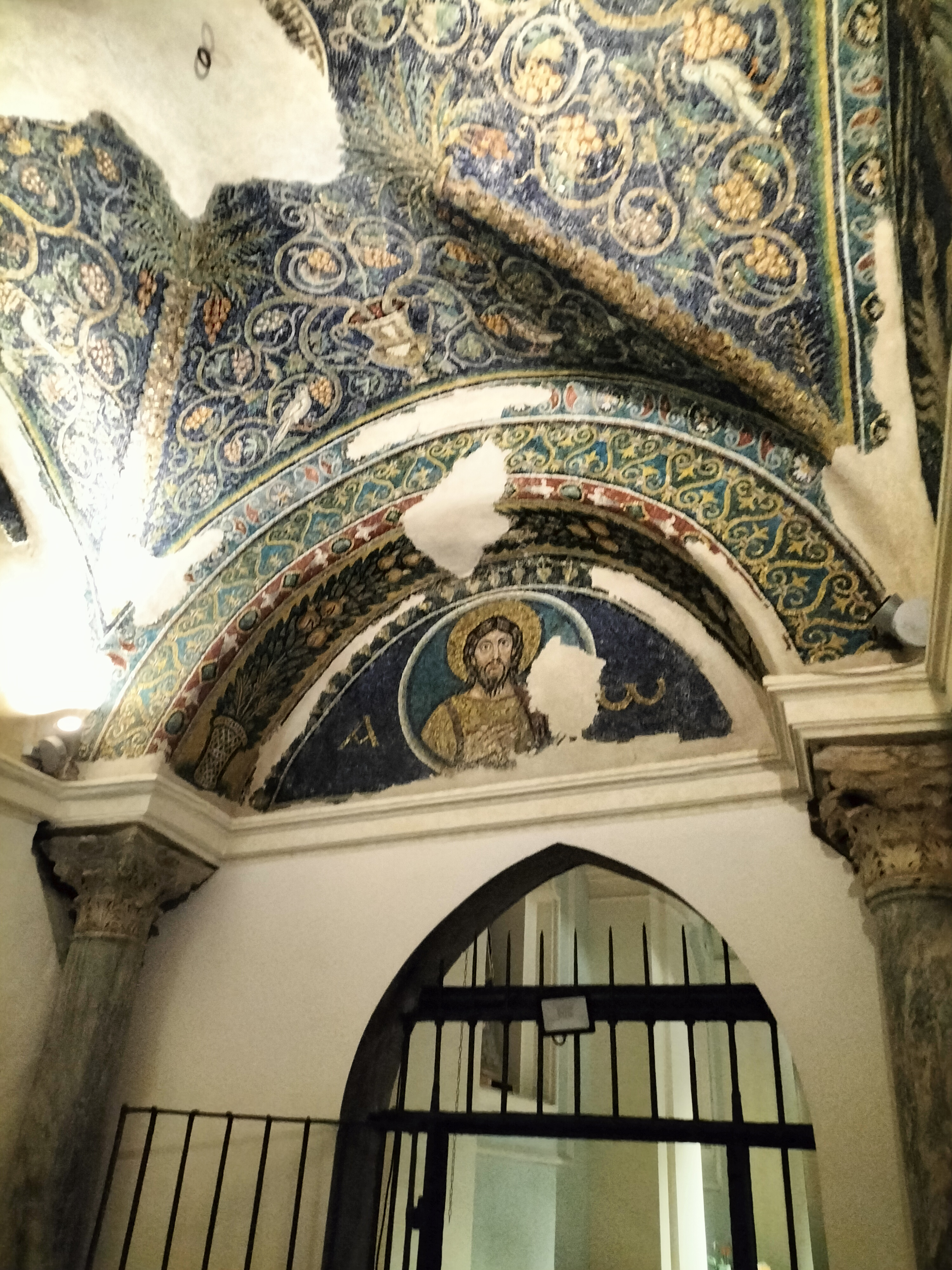
San Prisco

==== Ravenna ====
- Basilica di Sant’Agata Maggiore (it) (5th–6th) — fragments at windows
- Archbishop's Chapel (5th–6th)
- Baptistery of Neon or Orthodox Baptistery
- Mausoleum of Galla Placidia
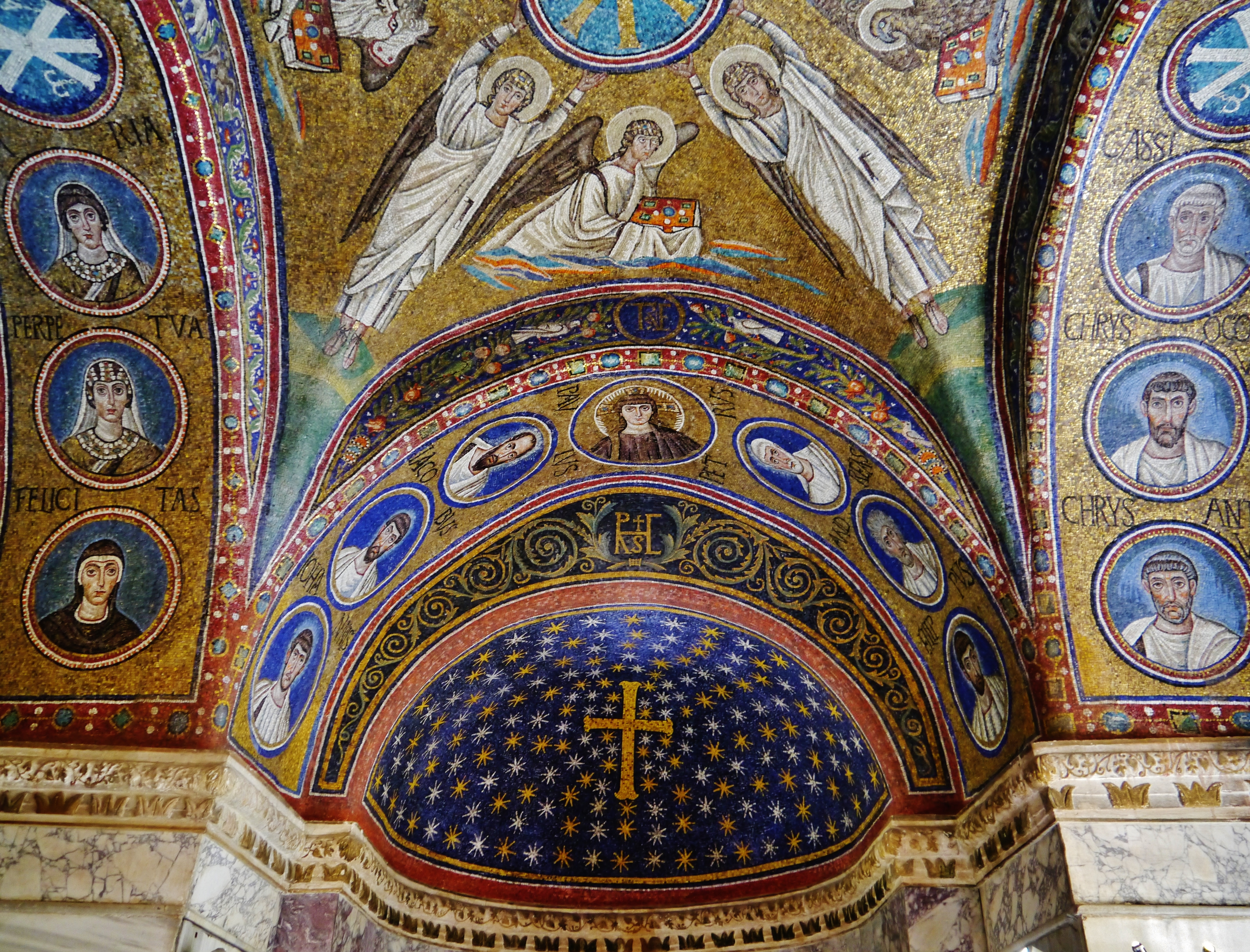
Archbishop's Chapel

Baptistery of Neon

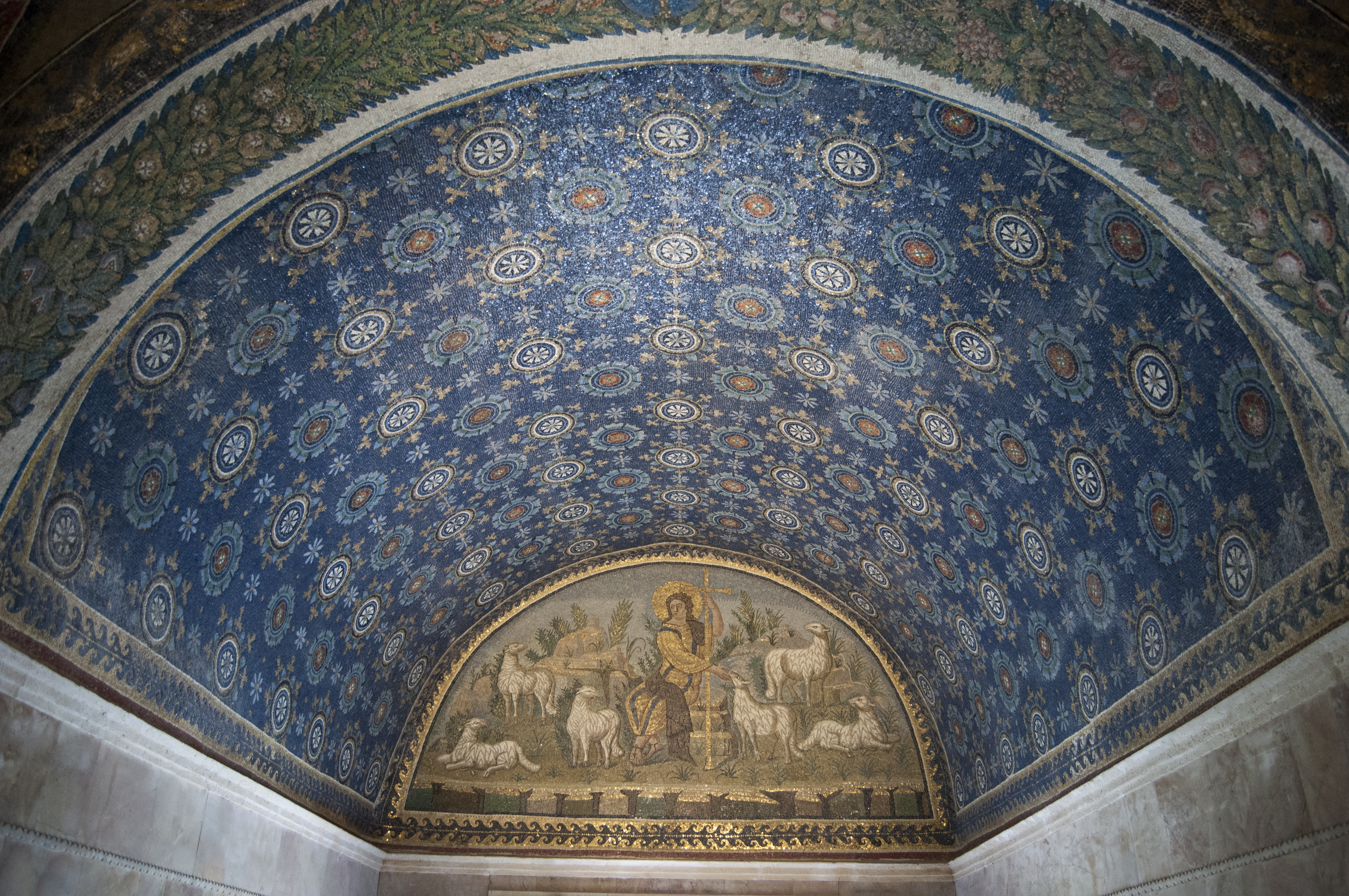
Mausoleum of Galla Placidia

==== Rome ====
- Church of Santa Pudenziana (402—417)
- Lateran Baptistery (S. Giovanni in Fonte), Chapel of SS. Cyprian and Justina (or SS. Secunda and Rufina)
- Lateran Baptistery (S. Giovanni in Fonte), Chapel of St John the Evangelist
- Church of Santa Maria Maggiore — triumphal arch and neuve mosaic. See one of them «The Parting of Lot and Abraham».
- Church of San Paolo fuori le mura
- Church of Santa Sabina
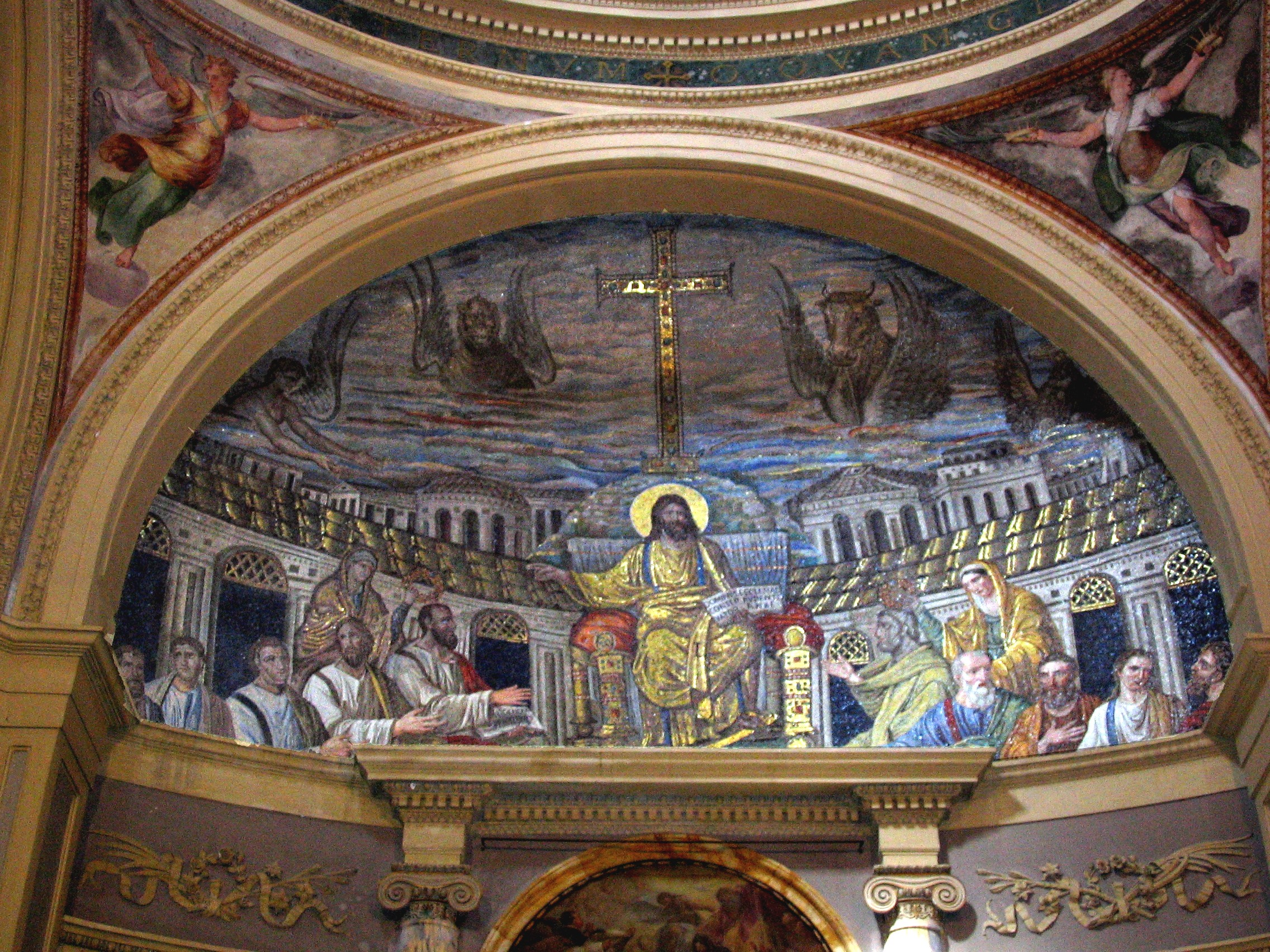
Santa Pudenziana

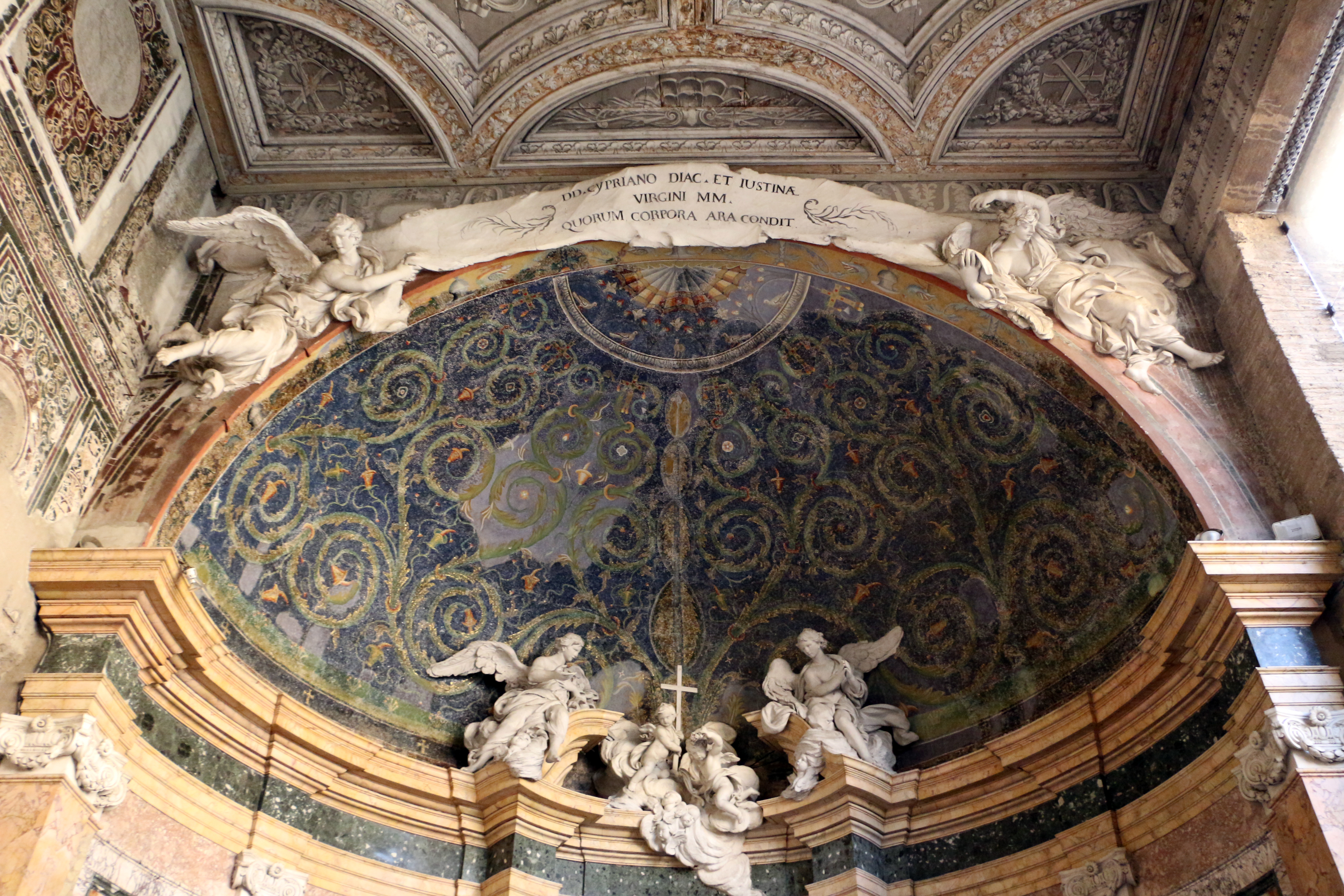
Chapel of SS. Cyprian and Justina

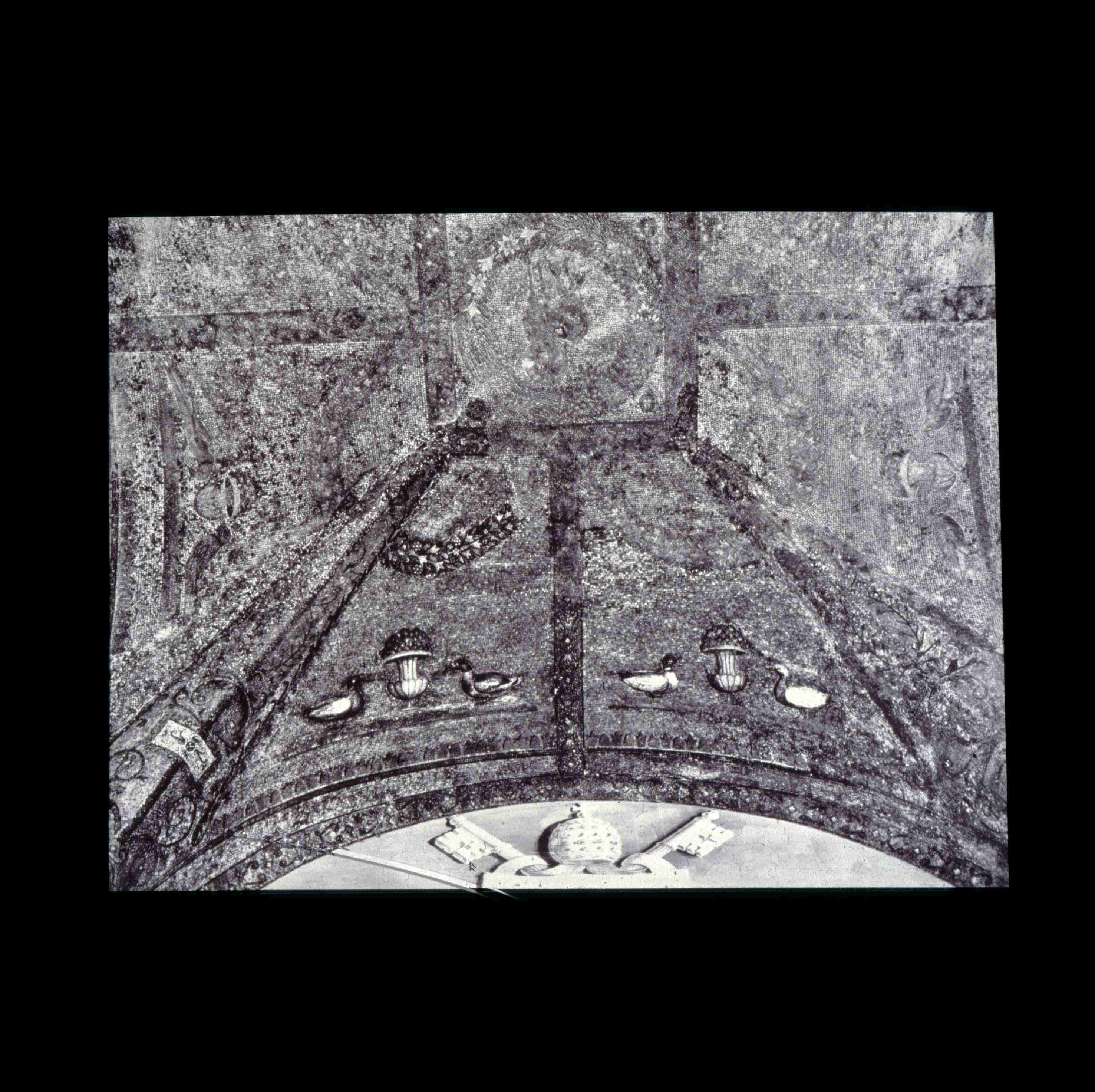
Chapel of St John the Evangelist

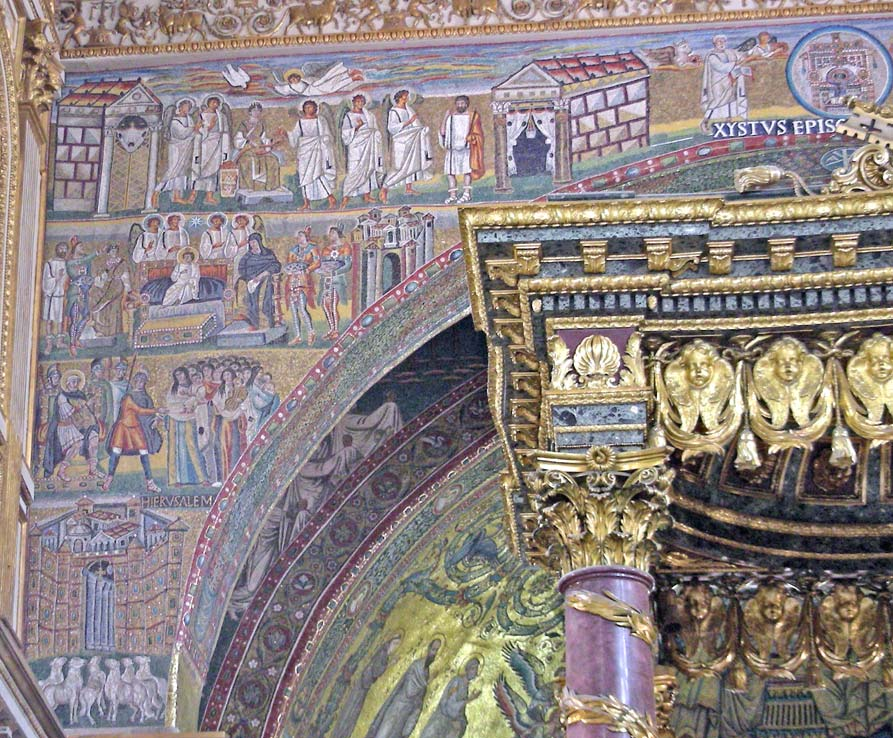
Santa Maria Maggiore

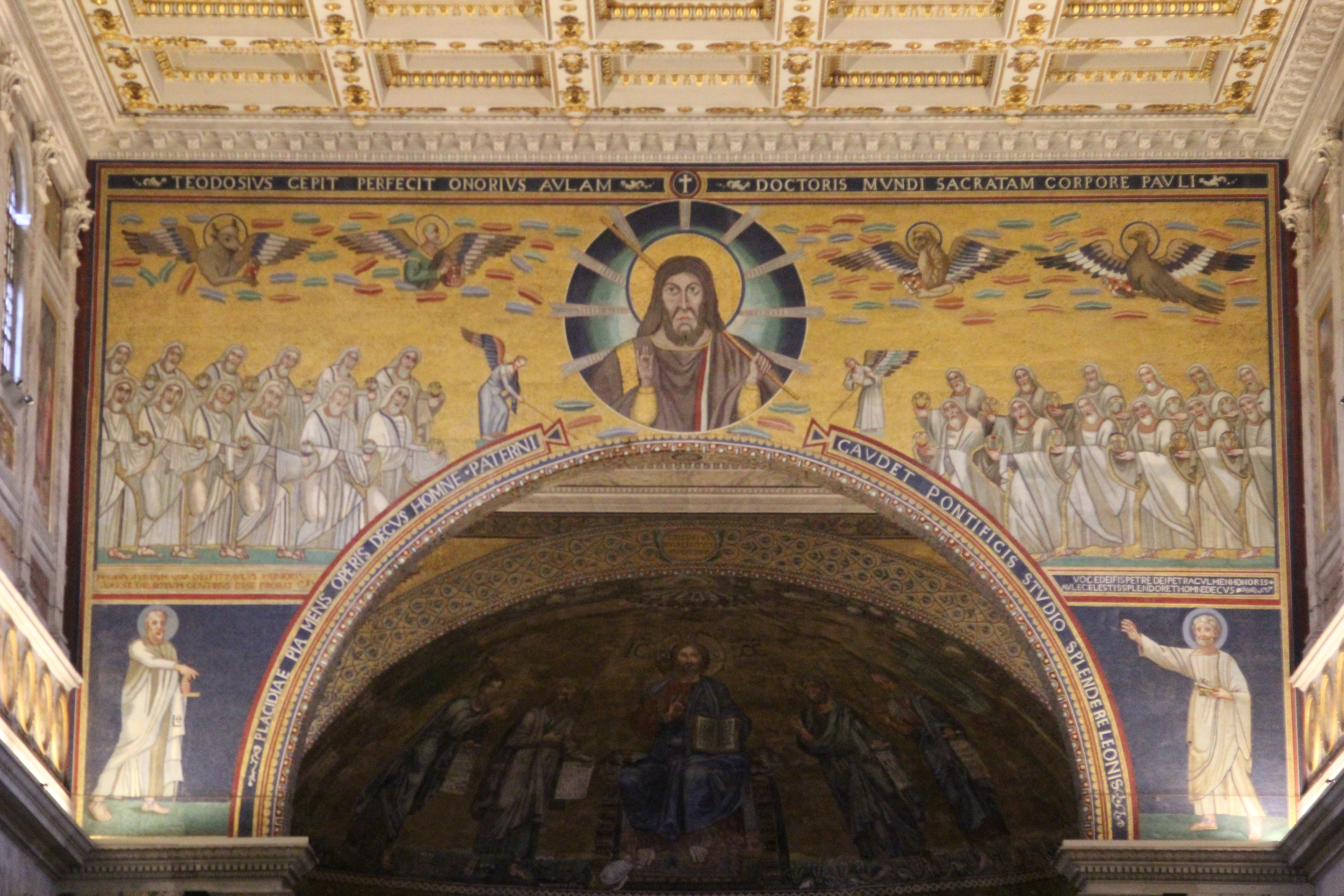
San Paolo fuori le mura

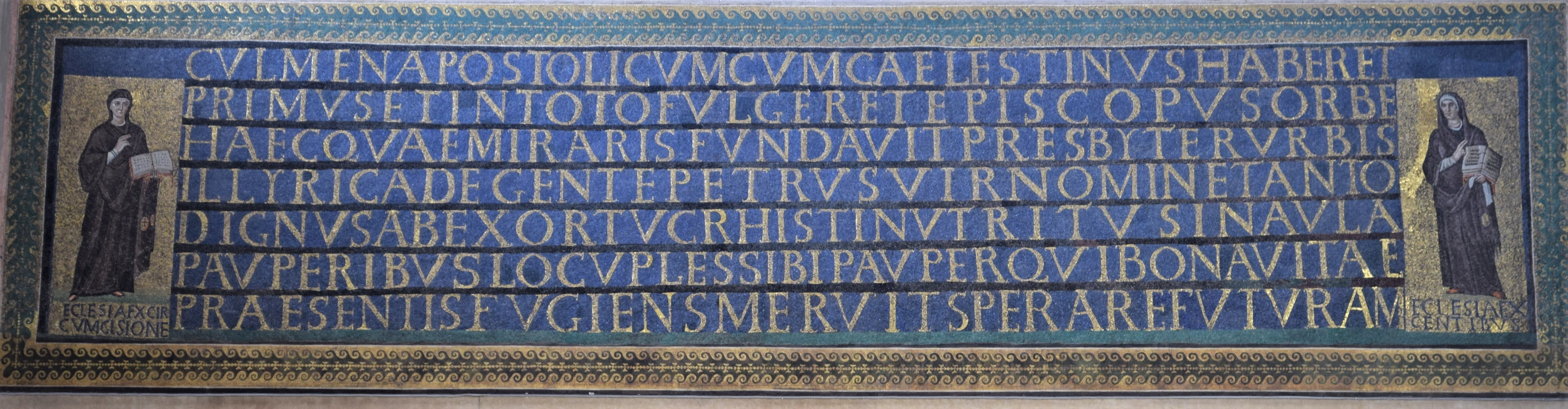
Santa Sabina

=== Levant ===
- Hawarte / Huarte, Apameia (Siria), Basilica A, or the so-called Michaelion and Basilica B, or the so-called Basilica of Archbishop Photios — mosaics with Adam and unicorn, early iconography
- Tabgha (Galilee, Israel), Church of the Multiplication — earliest known examples of figurative floor mosaics in Christian art in the Holy Land.
- Taybat al-Imam (Syria), Church of the Holy Martyrs (442) — floor map mosaic
- Petra (Jordan), Byzantine Church — floor mosaic
- Mosaique de Qabr Hiram (from Tomb of Hiram, Lebanon) now in Louvre
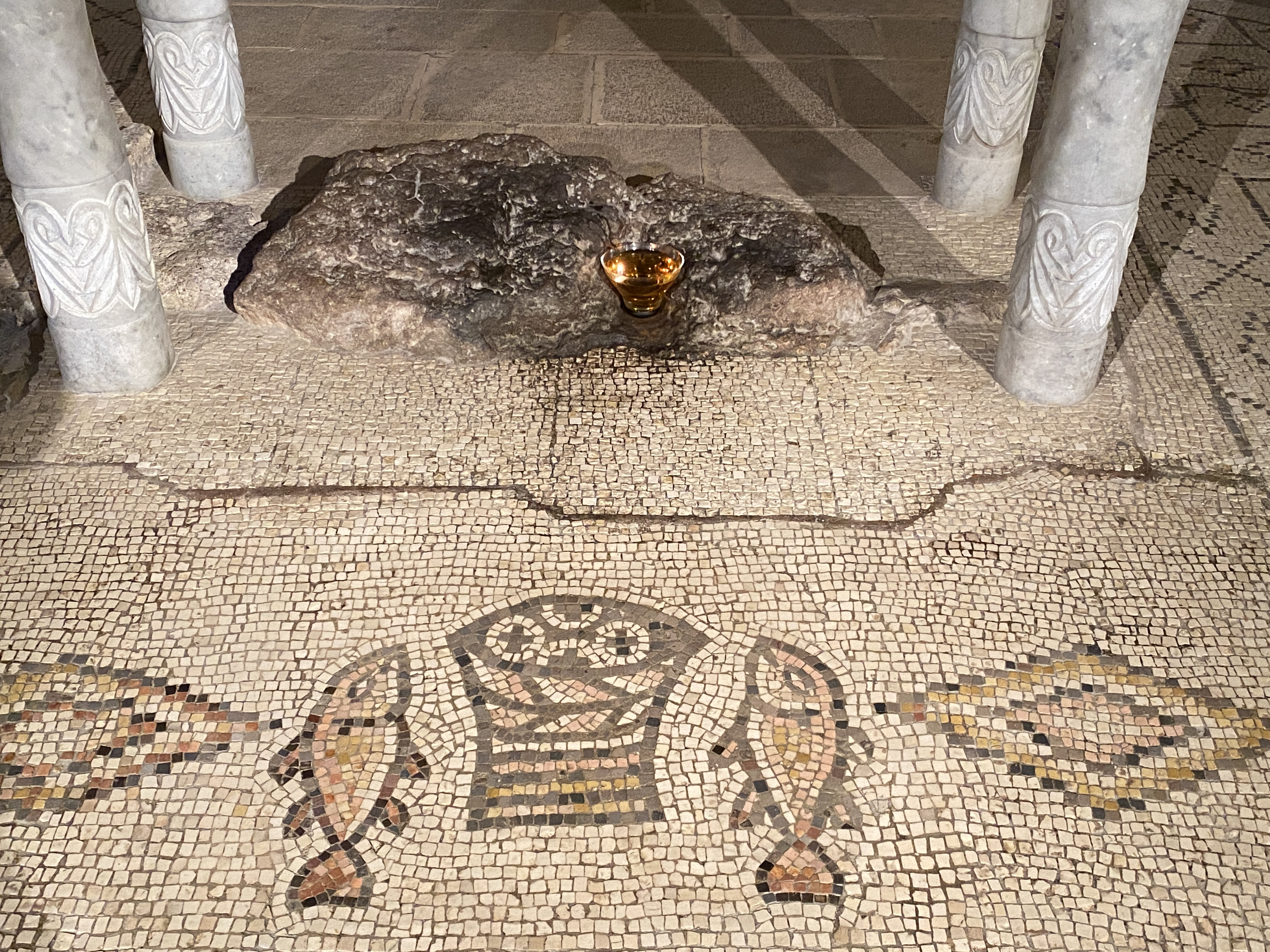
Church of the Multiplication

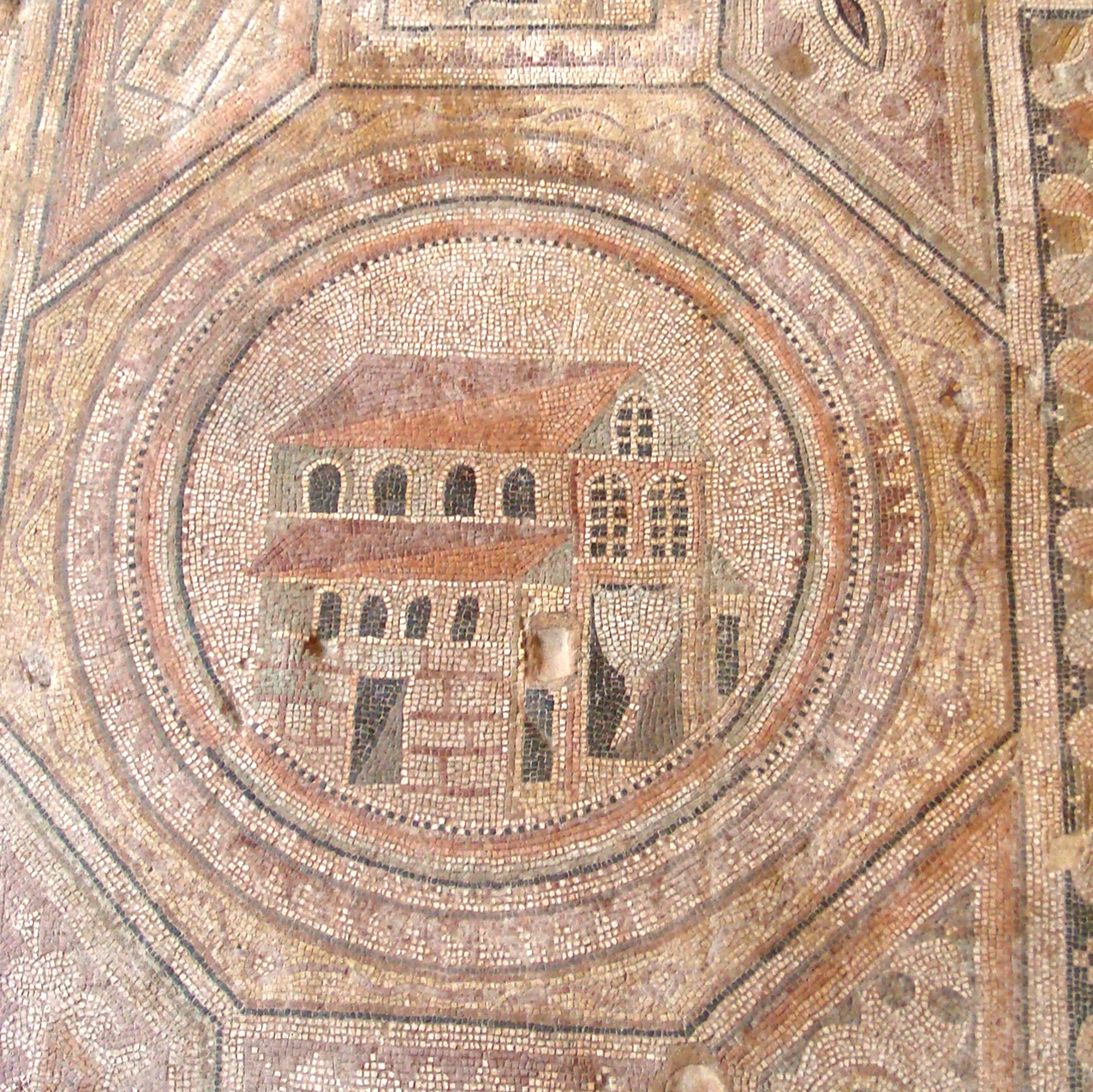
Taybat al-Imam

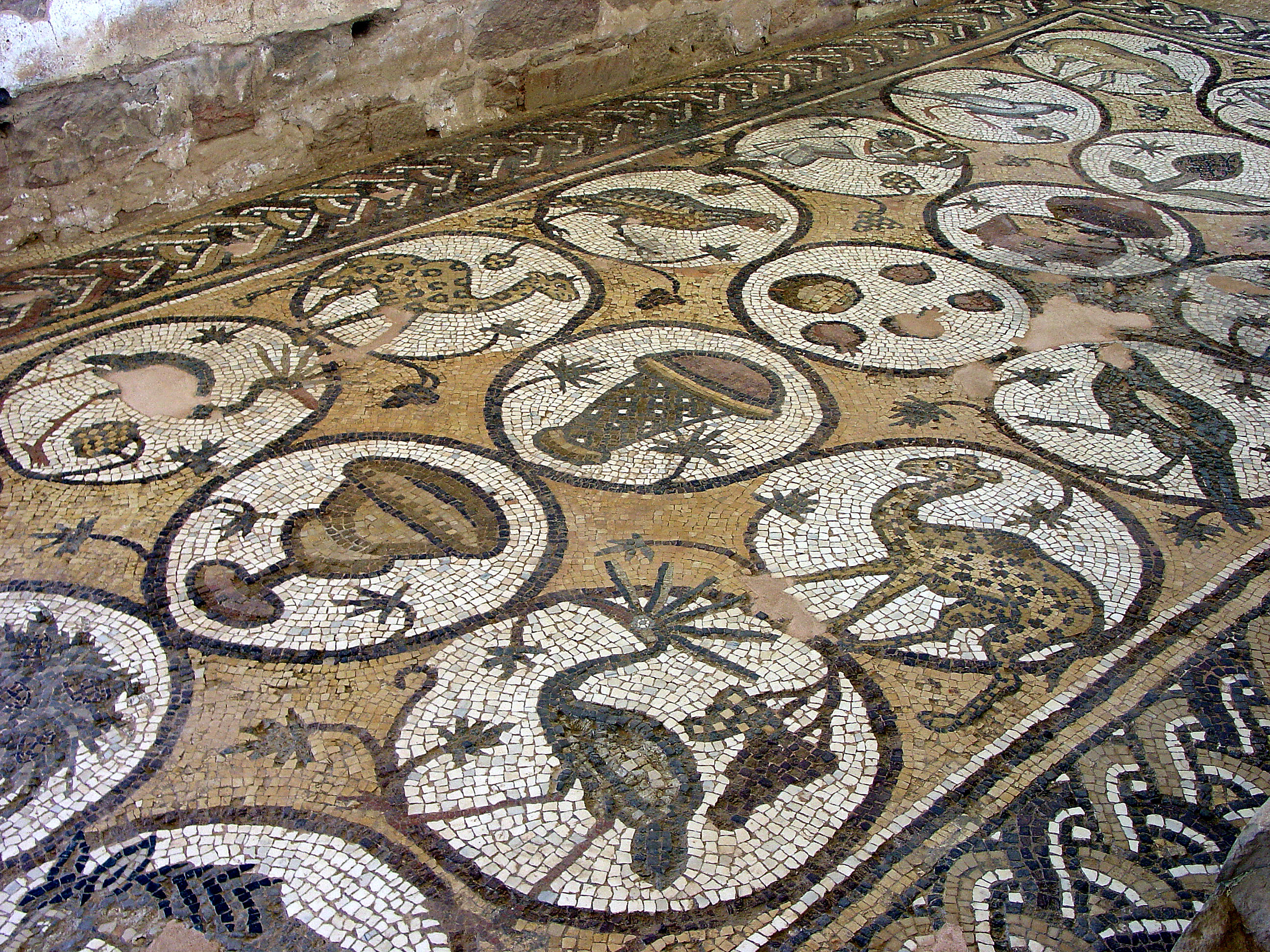
Byzantine Church (Petra)

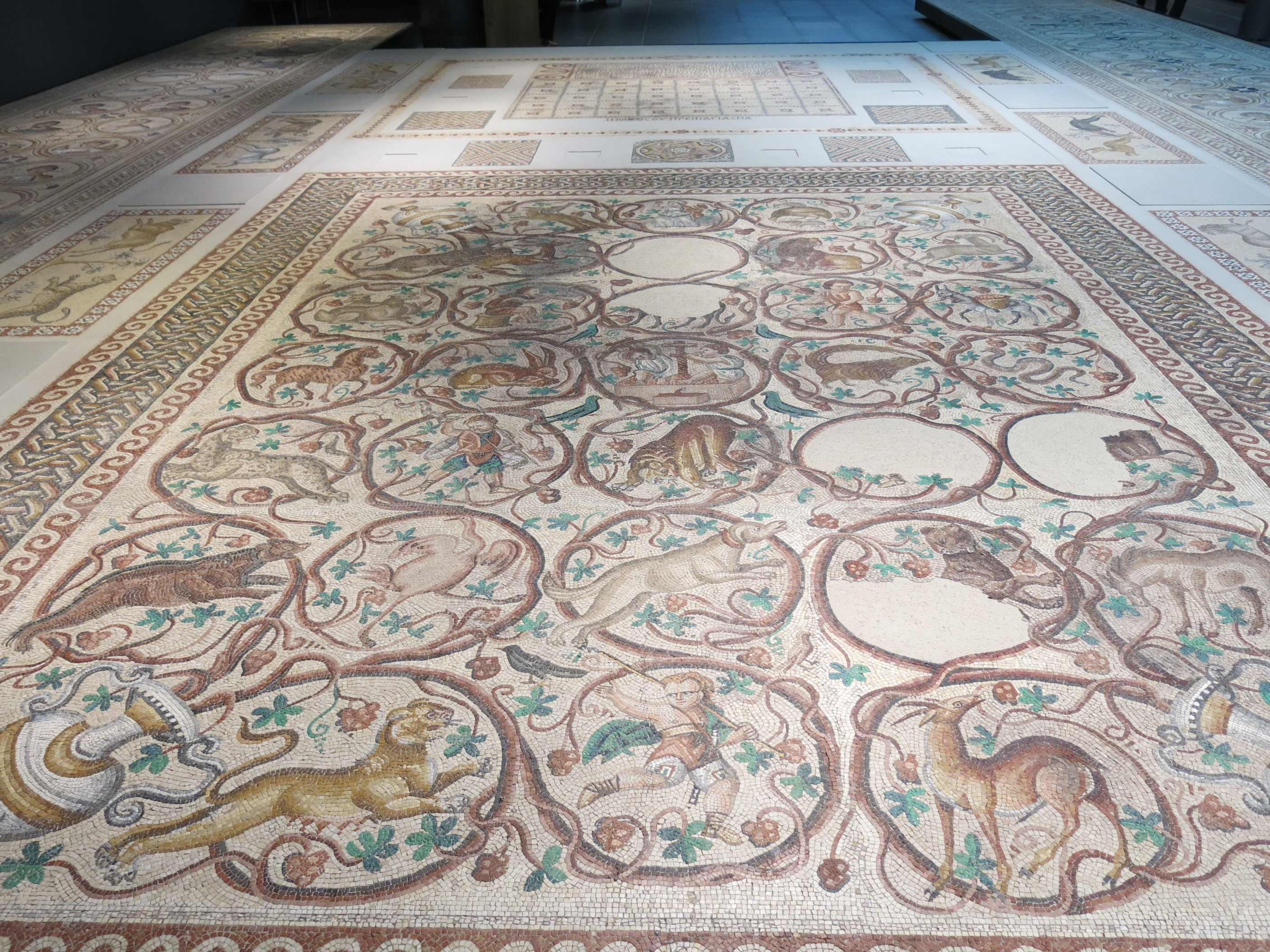
Qabr Hiram

=== North Macedonia ===
- Ohrid, Plaošnik Basilica (bg:Плаошнишка поликонхална църква)- floor mosaic
- Stobi (Gradsko), Stobi Palace — floor mosaic
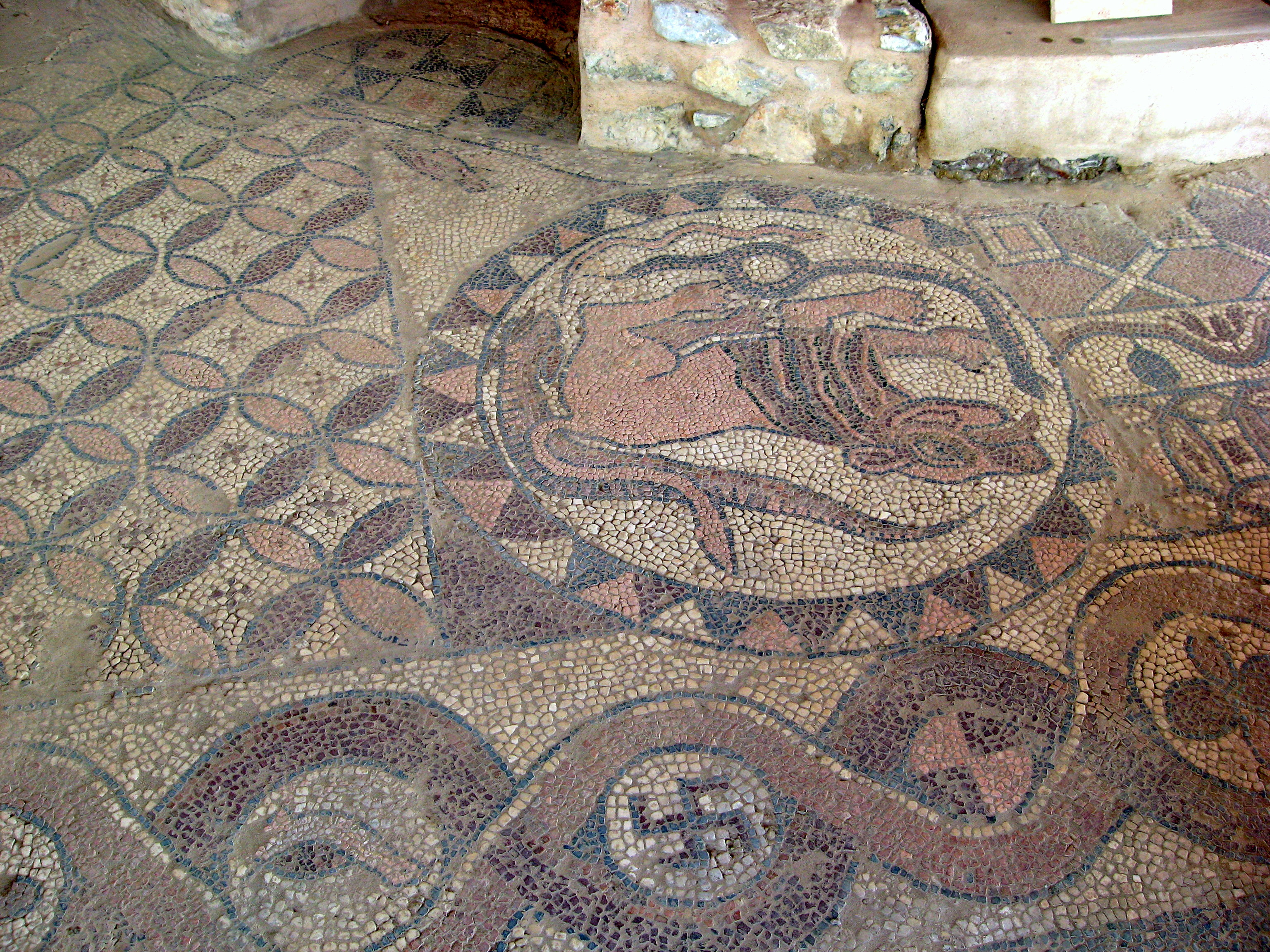
Plaošnik

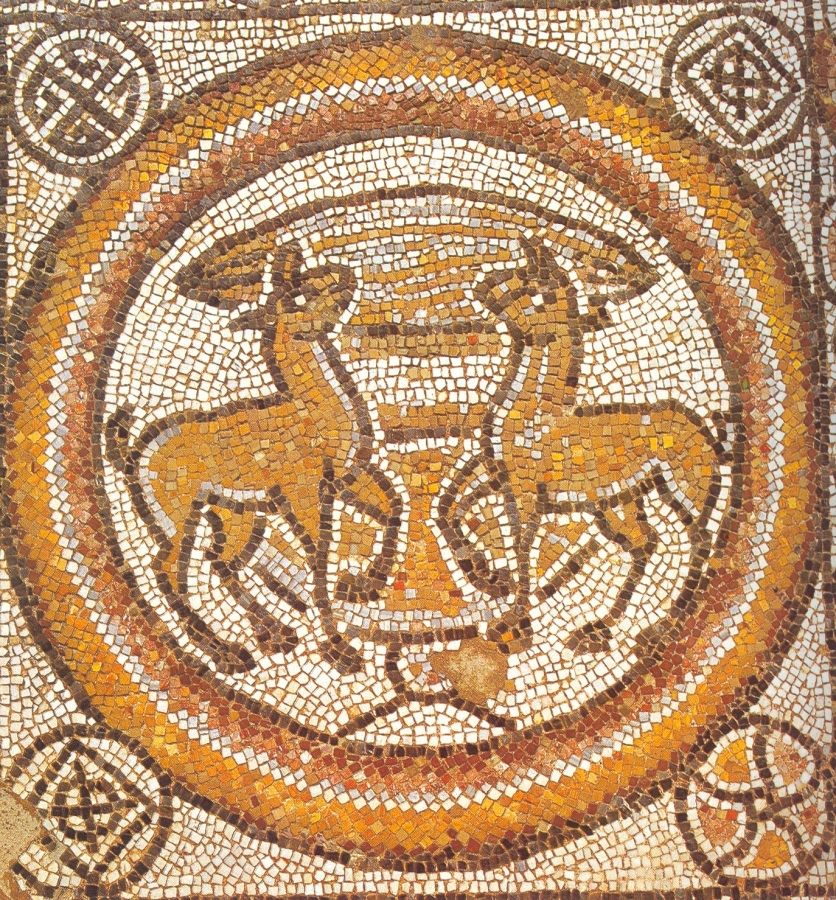
Stobi

=== Tunis ===
- Ecclesia Mater mosaic in the Bardo National Museum
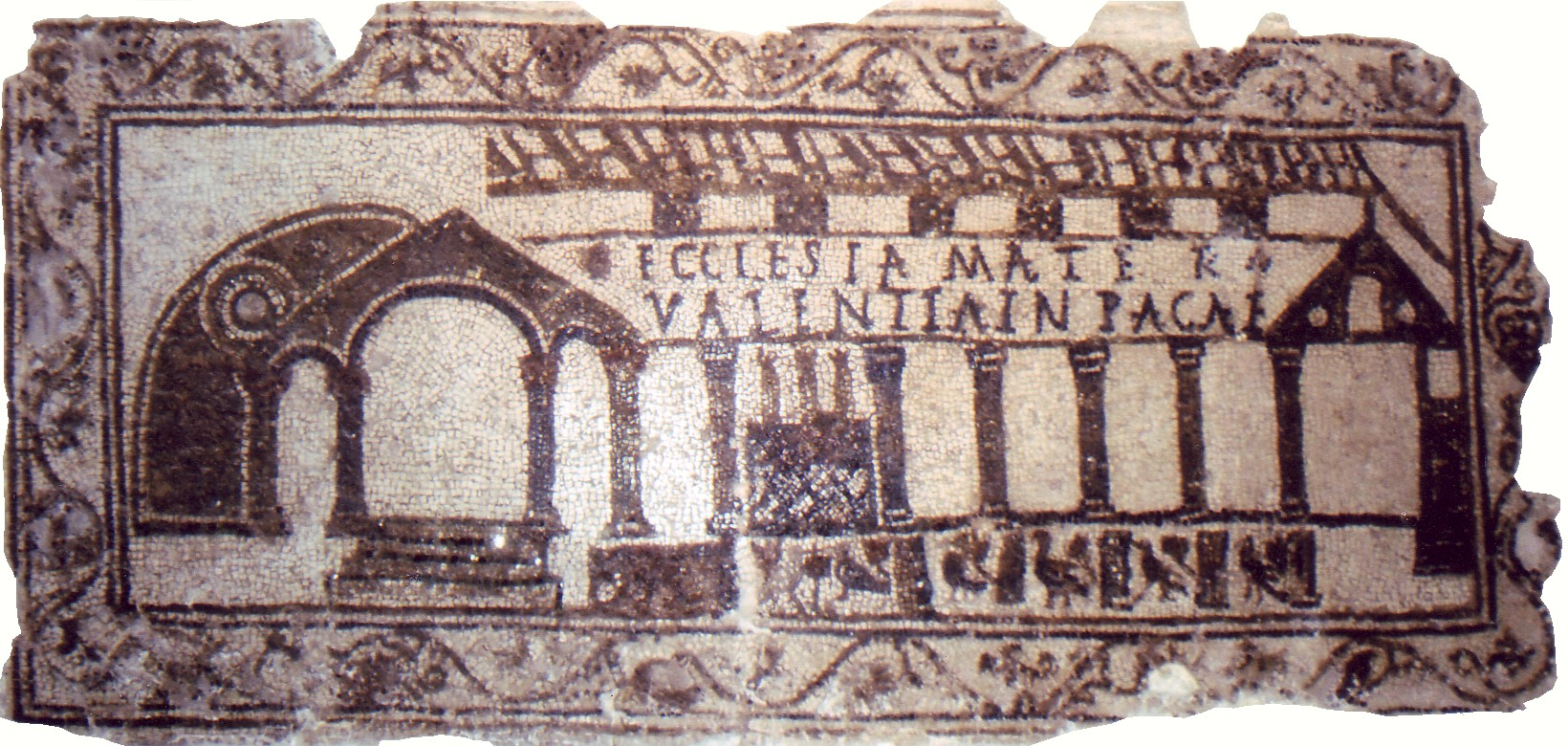
Ecclesia Mater

=== Turkey ===
- Antakya, «Yakto mosaic» / Megalopsychia Hunt of Antioch mosaics (Antakya Archaeological Museum)
- Hanyıkığı / Kelenderis, Aydıncık mosaic / Mosaic of Kelenderis — map mosaic (5–6th centuries)
- Klarjeti (former Georgia), Akhiza Cathedral (ru) (5th–6th). In 1913, A. Florensky, on a mission from the Caucasus Museum, visited the monastery ruins. According to his information, the altar of one of the churches contained a mosaic image of the Virgin Mary, almost completely destroyed. Florensky reported that a local jeweler named Usta-Gekork had removed the mosaic for sale abroad. Some fragments of the local mosaic are reportedly in museums, but no specific details are available.
- Istanbul, Church of St John of Stoudios, Monastery of Stoudios — now in ruins, some fragments of mosaics may survived
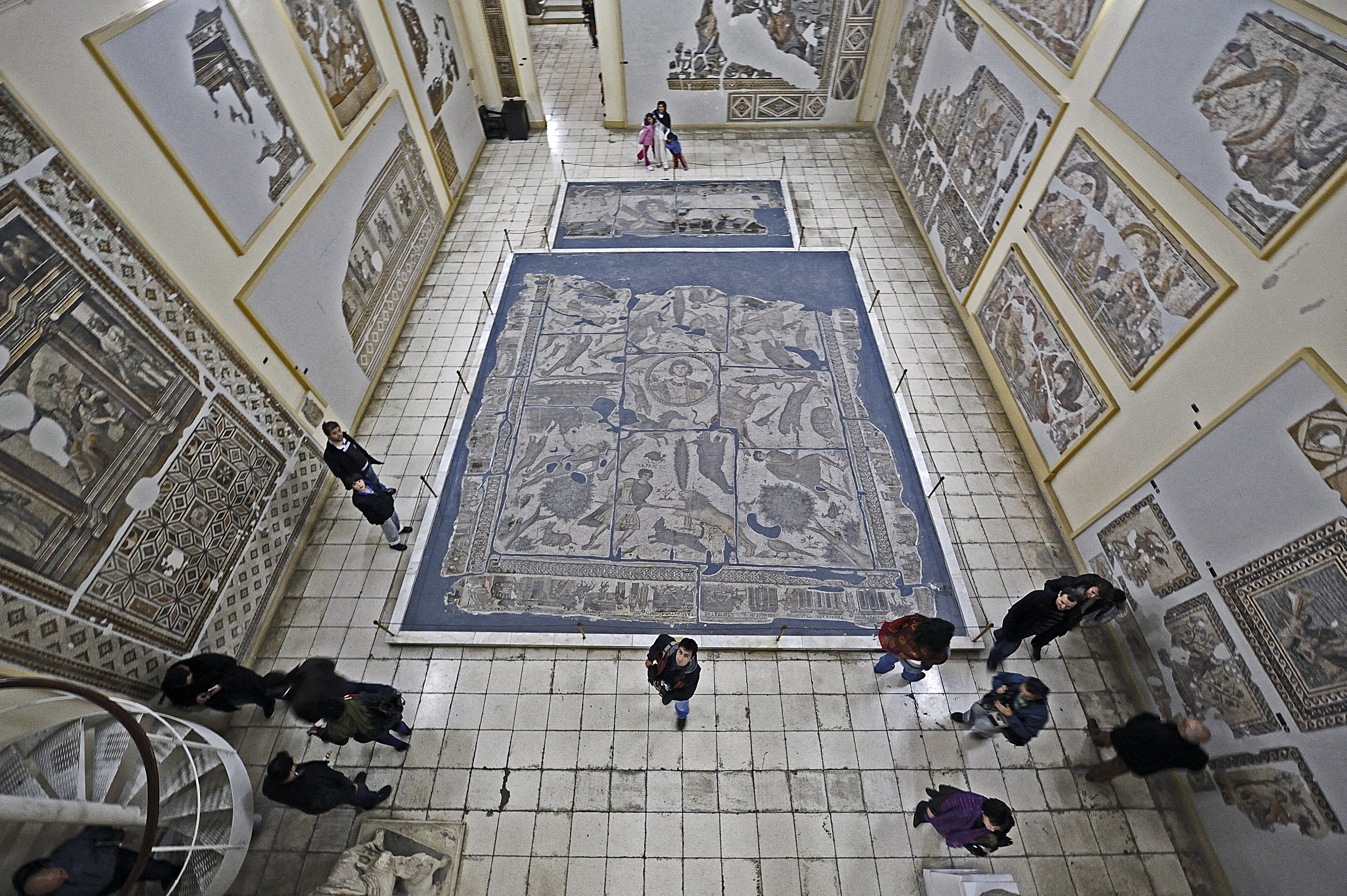
Yakto mosaic

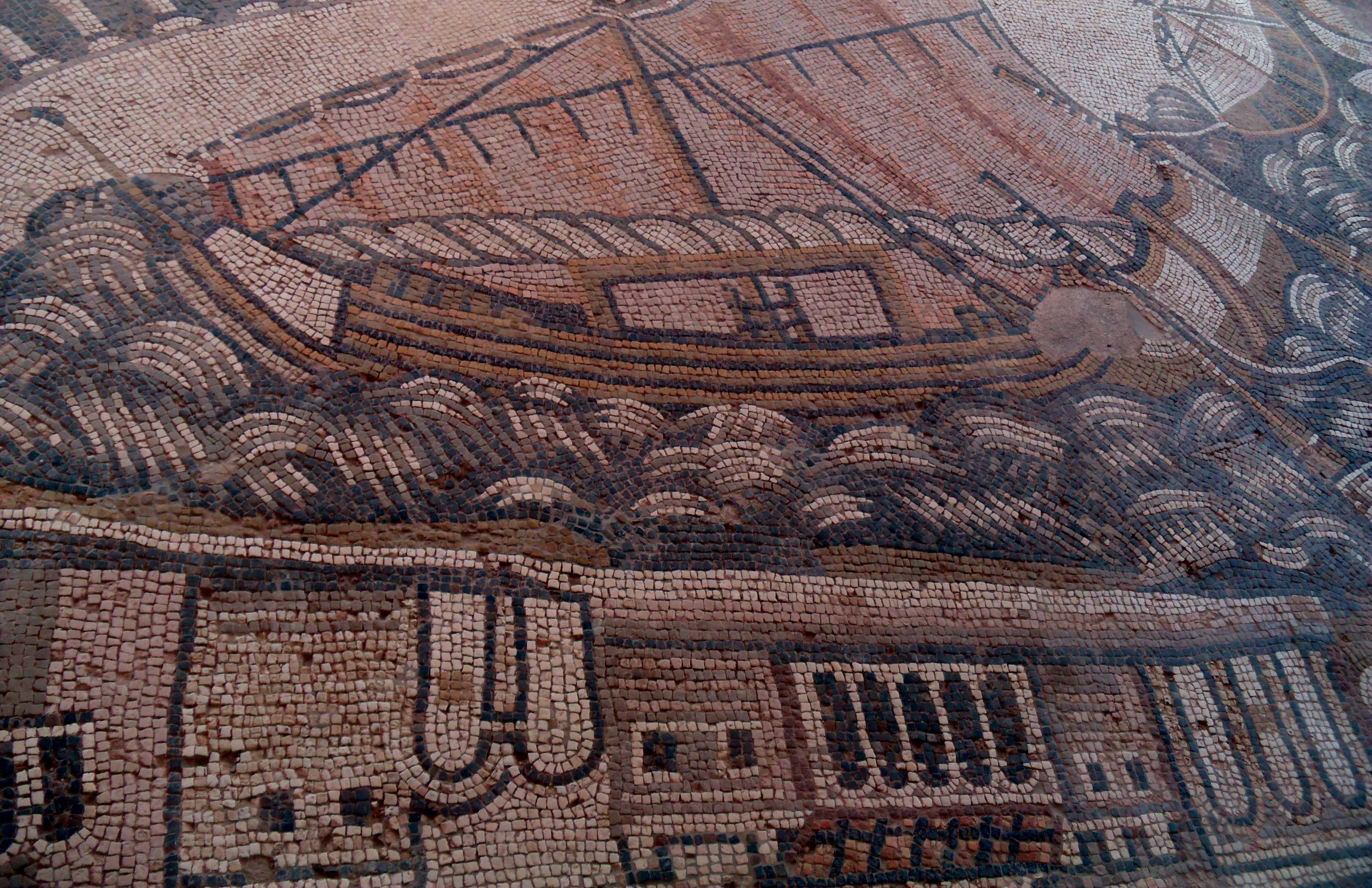
Aydıncık mosaic

== 6th century ==
=== Croatia ===
- Poreč, Euphrasian Basilica
- Pula, Church of Santa Maria del Canneto (Maria Formosa)- ruins, fragments in museums
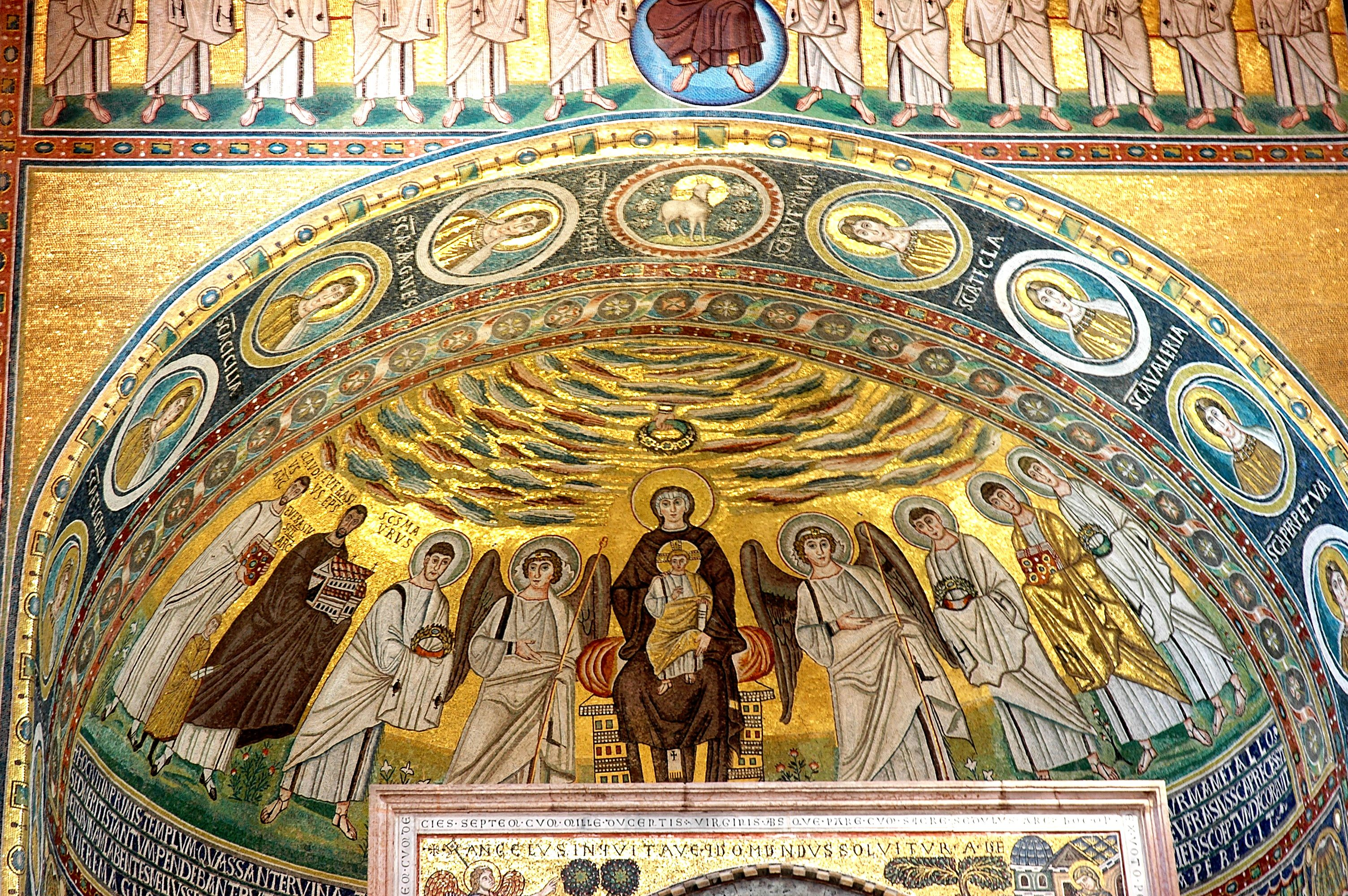
Euphrasian Basilica

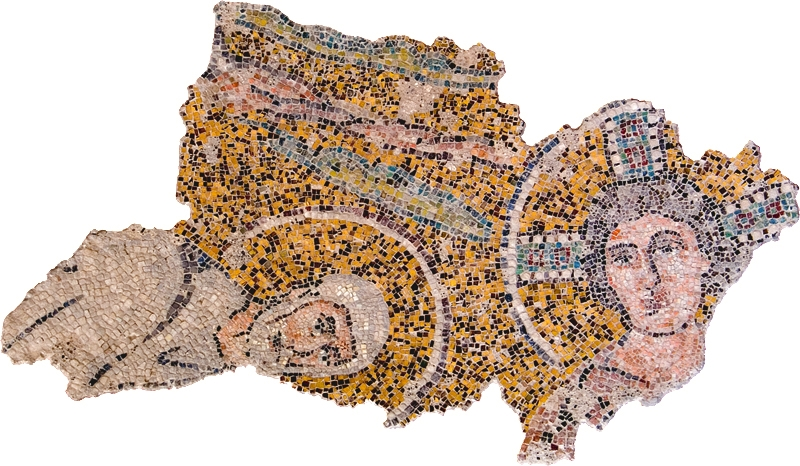
Santa Maria del Canneto

=== Cyprus ===
- Kiti, Church of Panagia tis Angeloktistis
- Livadia (Northern Cyprus), Church of Panagia Kyra (el:Παναγία Κυρά (Λιβάδια) — photos exists, in the 21st century not survived (possibly stolen)
- Lythrangomi, Church of Panagia Kanakaria (el:Παναγία Κανακαριά) — some mosaics were stolen and sold in 1970s, now in private collections and museums, several were returned.
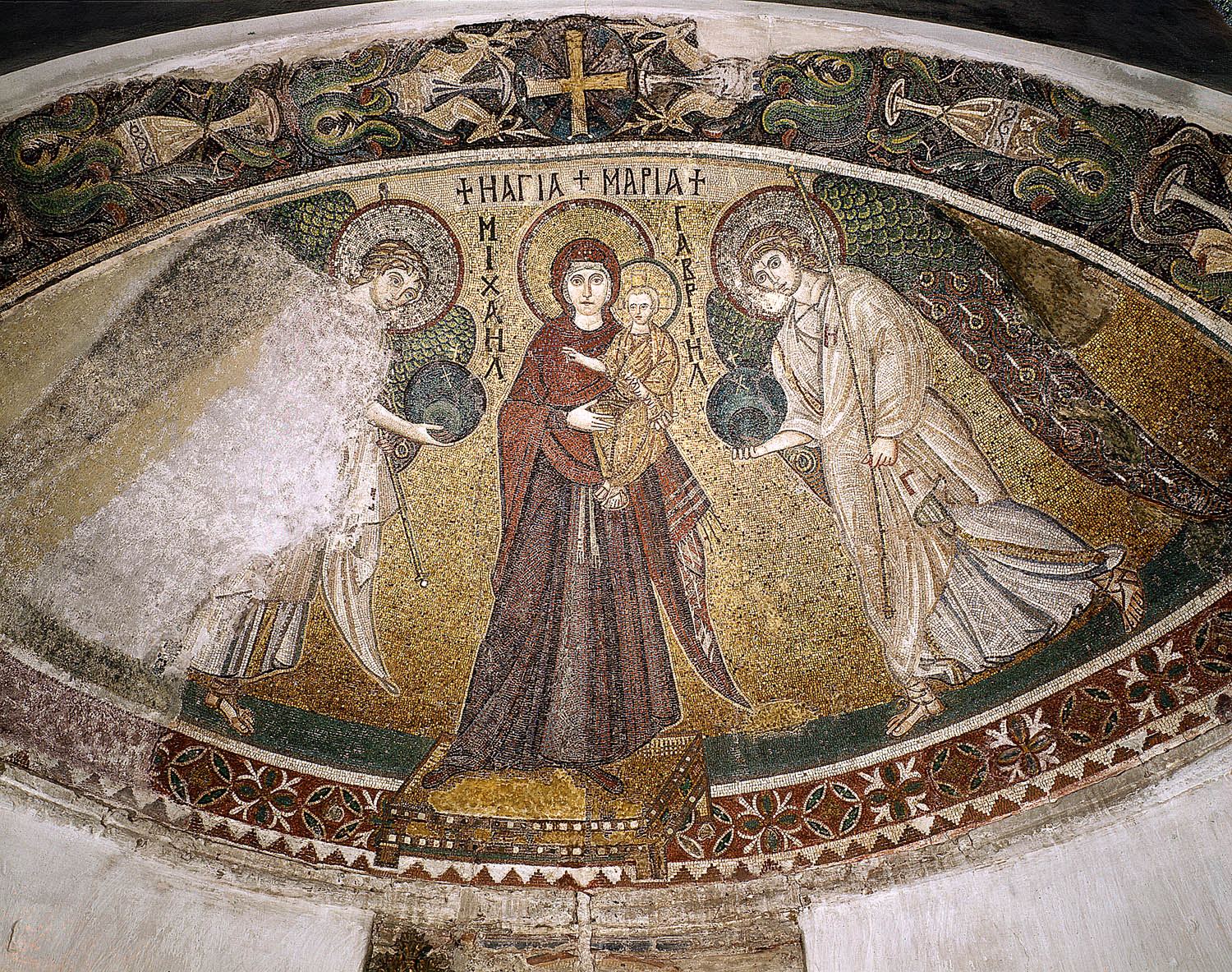
Panagia tis Angeloktistis

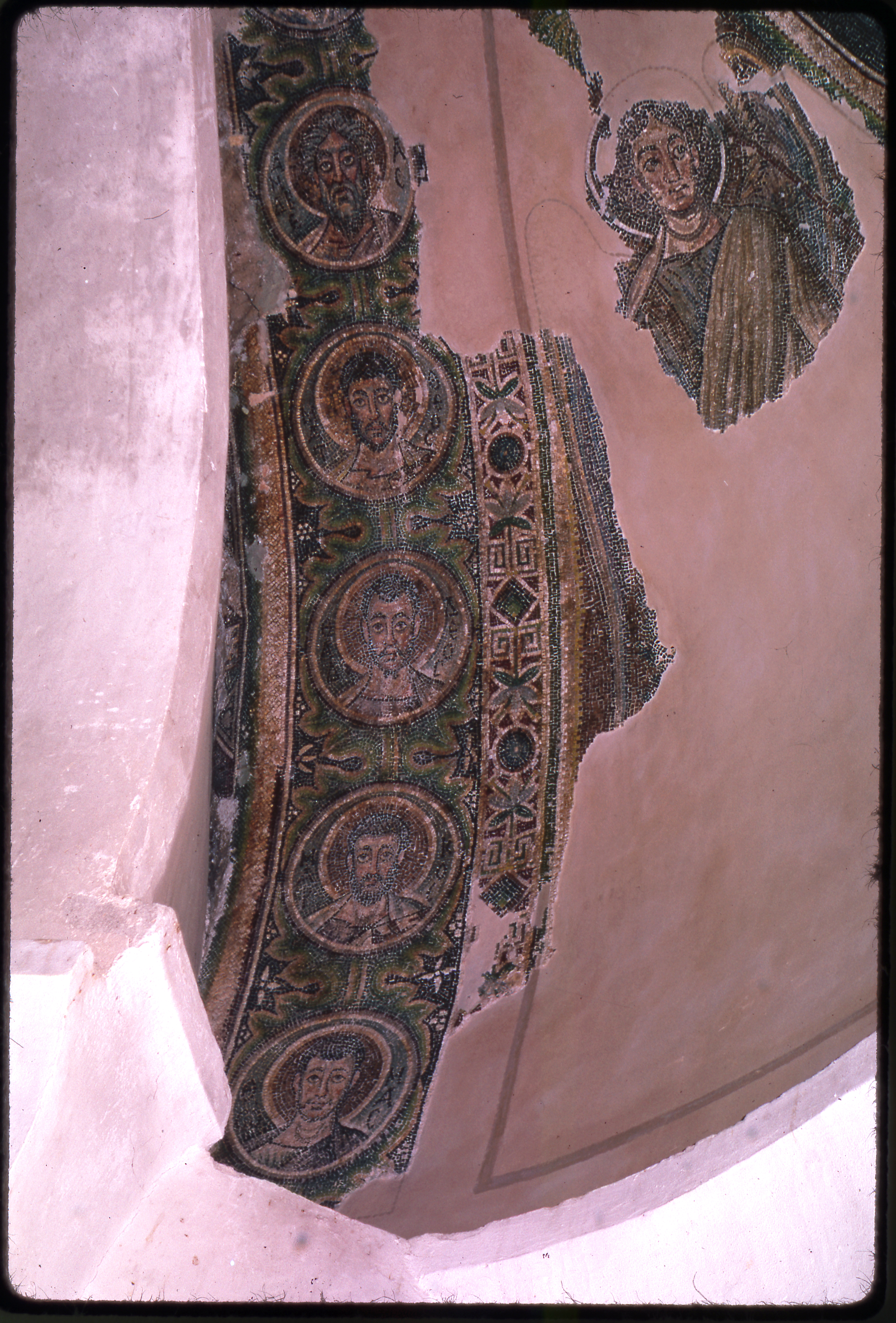
Panagia Kanakaria

=== Georgia ===
- near Mtskheta, Kartli Province, Jvari Monastery — the conch was covered in mosaic, but only a fragment remains
- Mtskheta, Minor Church of the Holy Cross — old descriptions hold information about presence of mosaics. According to Giorgi Chubinashvili, in 1916, when he visited the church, gold pebbles had survived in the «north corner of the conch, on the face of the arch of the conch»; notches intended for holding the destroyed mosaic composition on the wall were still visible on two stones in the north section of the conch (surface of the rest of the stones in the conch had already been badly damaged and weathered by the time). According to the same account, in 1914, the smalt pebbles scattered in the interior were sent over to the Tbilisi Museum of Historical-Ethnographic Society by the local monk Ilarion (case N1649). The pebbles brought from the church of the Holy Cross are additional material evidence to the fact that the minor church of the Holy Cross in Mtskheta was once ornamented with mosaics.

=== Greece, Thessaloniki ===
- Hagios Demetrios — some fragments of 6th century
- Pammegistoi Taxiarches Church — floor
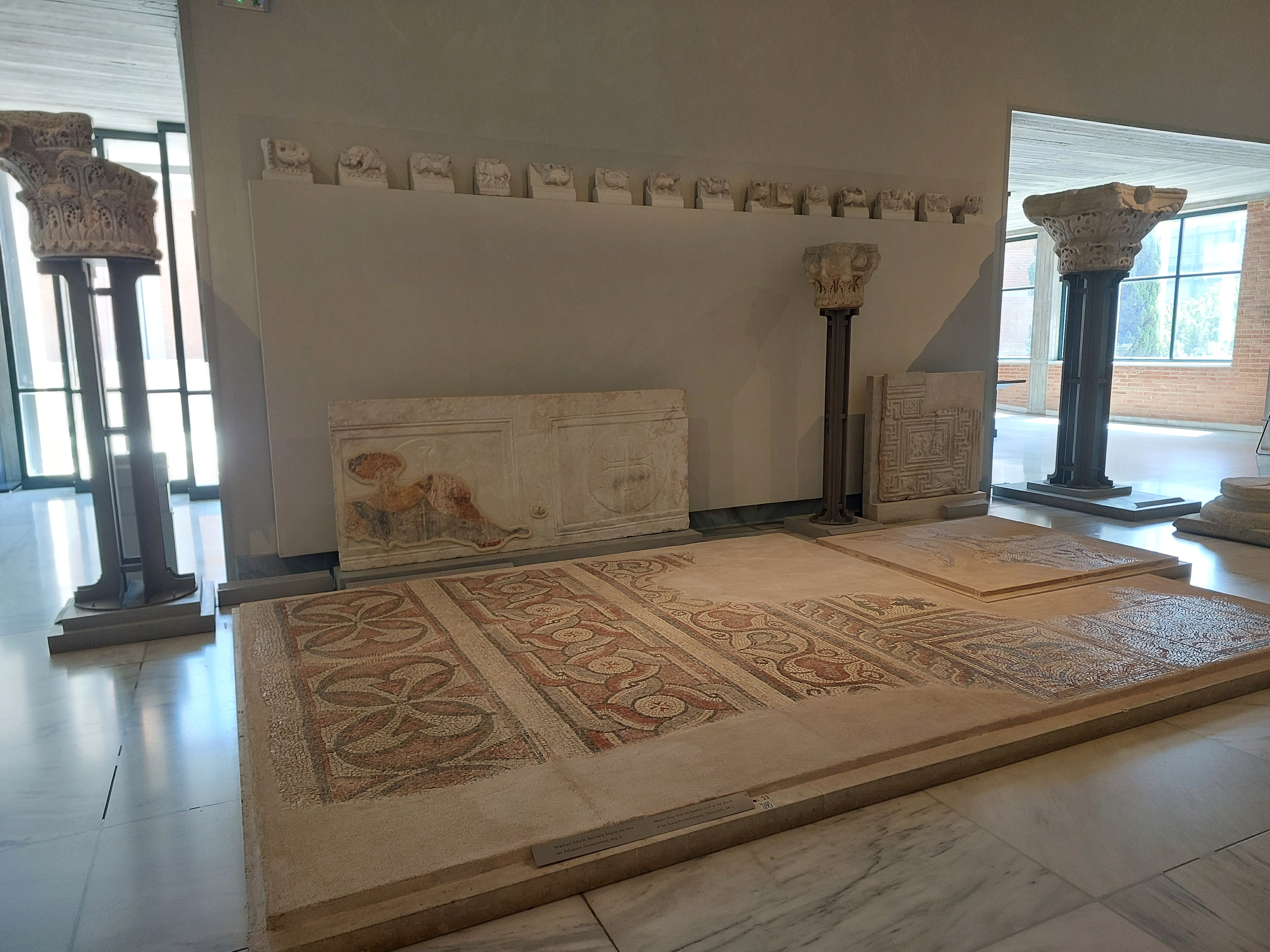
Pammegistoi Taxiarches Church

=== Italy ===
- Albenga, Albenga Baptistery
- Grado, Basilica of Sant’Eufemia- floor
- Padua, Basilica of Santa Giustina, chapel Sacello di San Prosdocimo (Shrine of St. Prosdocimus)
- Vicenza, Basilica of Saints Felix and Fortunatus, Chapel of S. Maria Mater Domini — mosaic floor
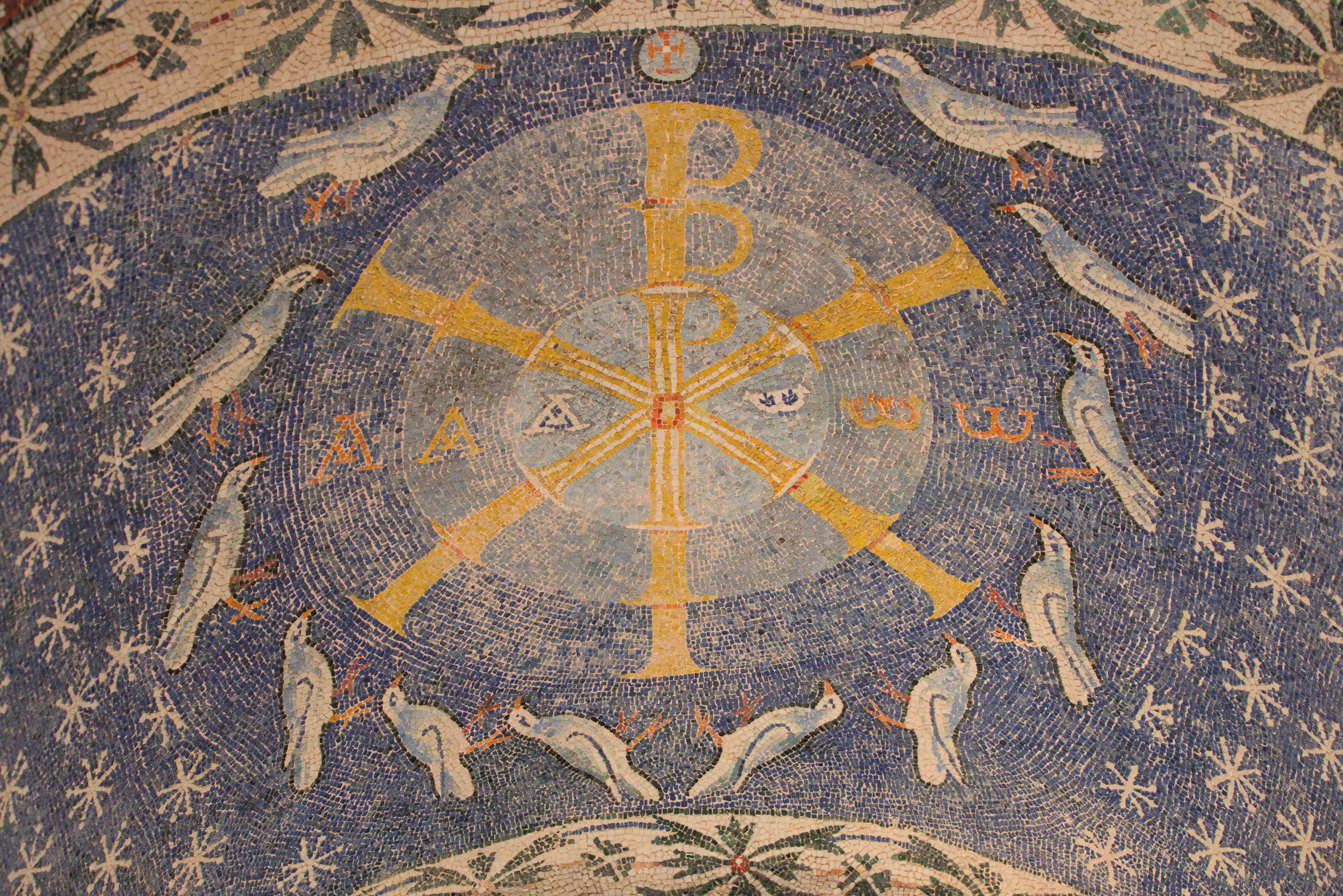
Albenga Baptistery

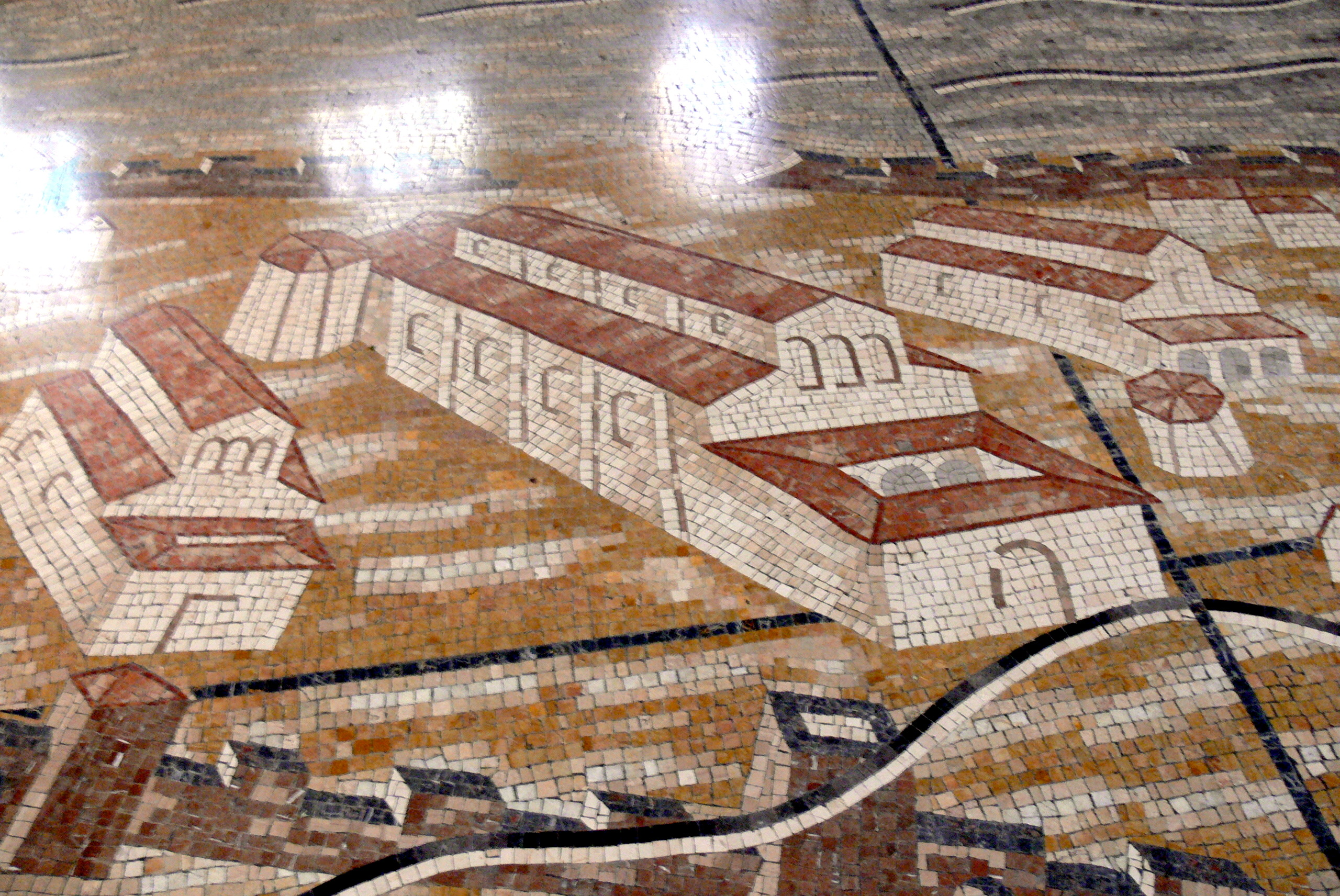
Grado

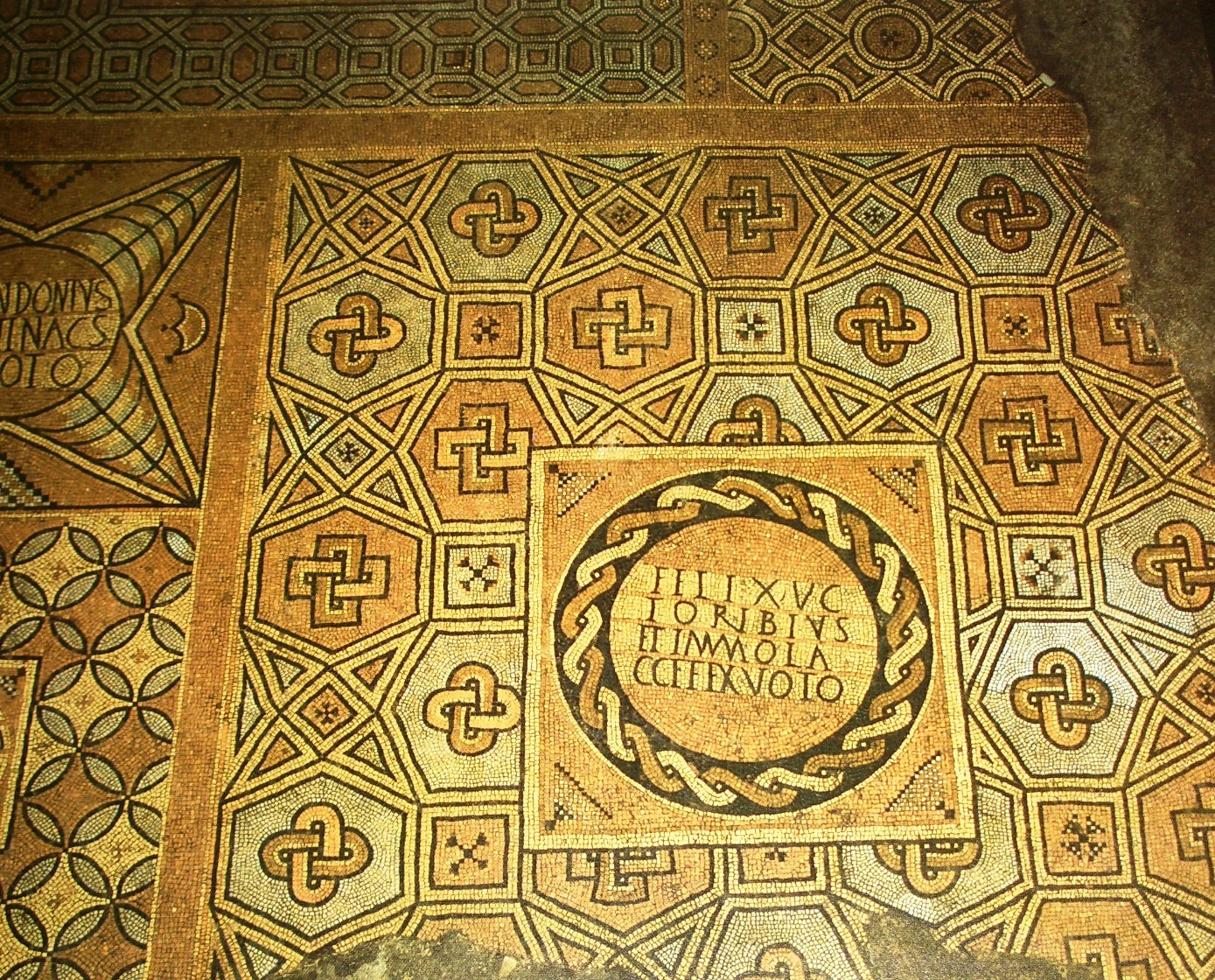
Basilica of Saints Felix and Fortunatus

==== Ravenna ====
- Archbishop’s Palace — random fragments on display (Archiepiscopal Museum, Ravenna)
- Arian Baptistery (c. 500)
- Basilica of Sant'Apollinare in Classe (549)
- Basilica of Sant'Apollinare Nuovo (c. 500)
- Church of San Michele in Africisco (it:Chiesa di San Michele in Africisco) — main mosaic is now in Bode Museum, Berlin, fragments are in various museums
- Basilica of San Severo, Classe (it:Basilica di San Severo) — demolished, mosaic floors founded.
- Basilica of San Vitale (548) — walls plus oldest church labyrinth floor in Europe
- Domus dei Tappeti di Pietra (it) — floor mosaic «Danza delle Stagioni» and other
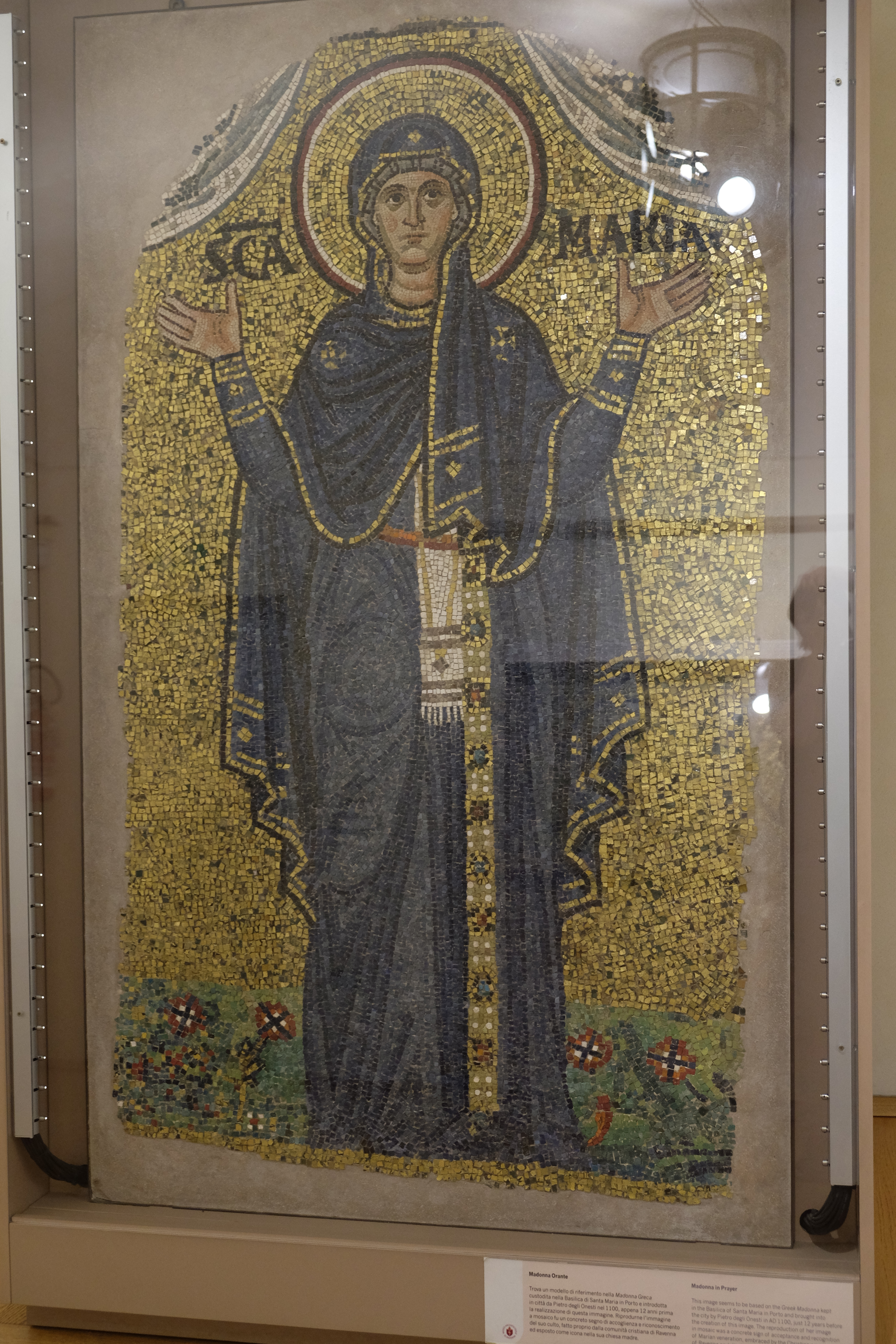
Archiepiscopal Museum

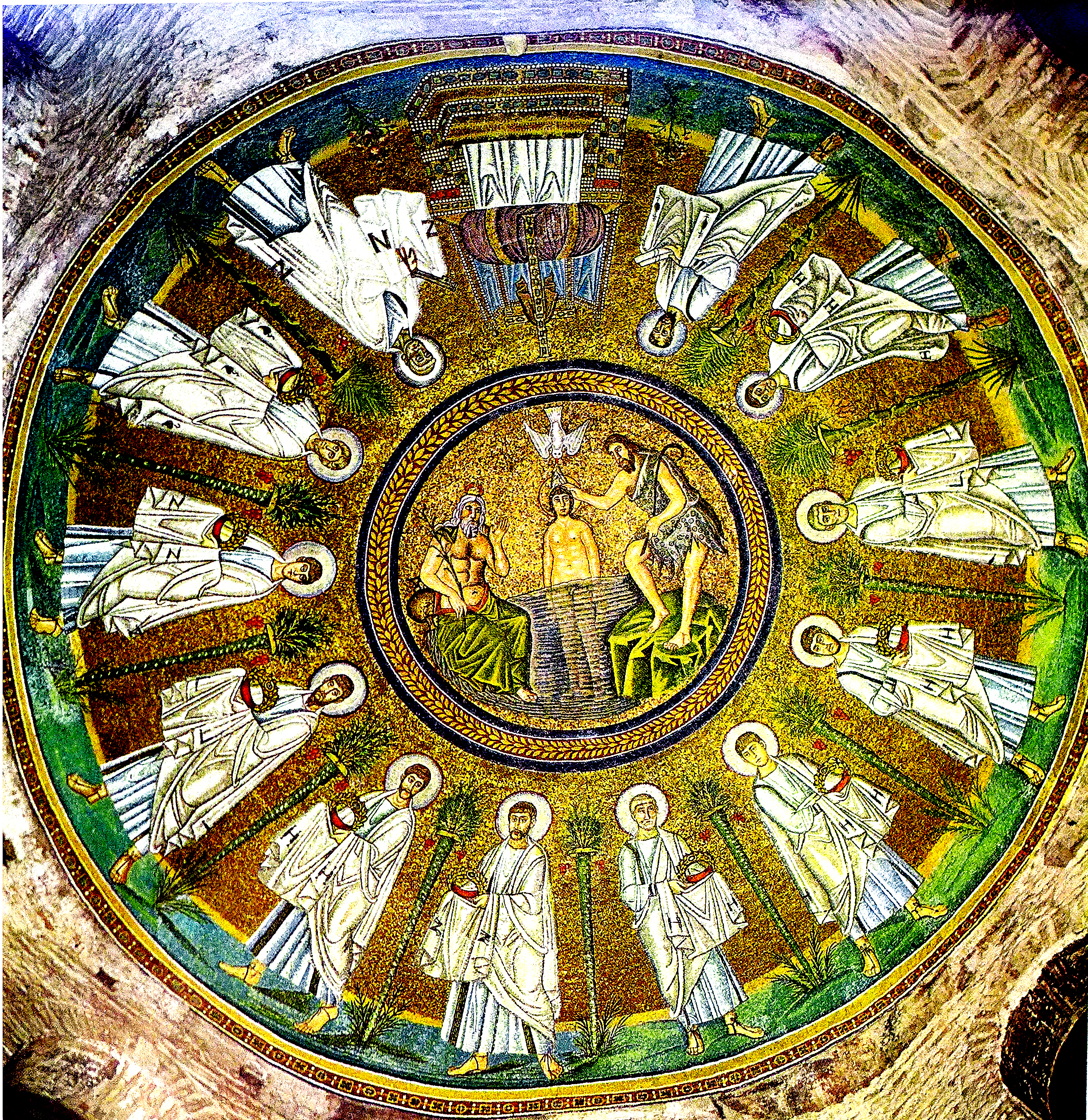
Arian Baptistery

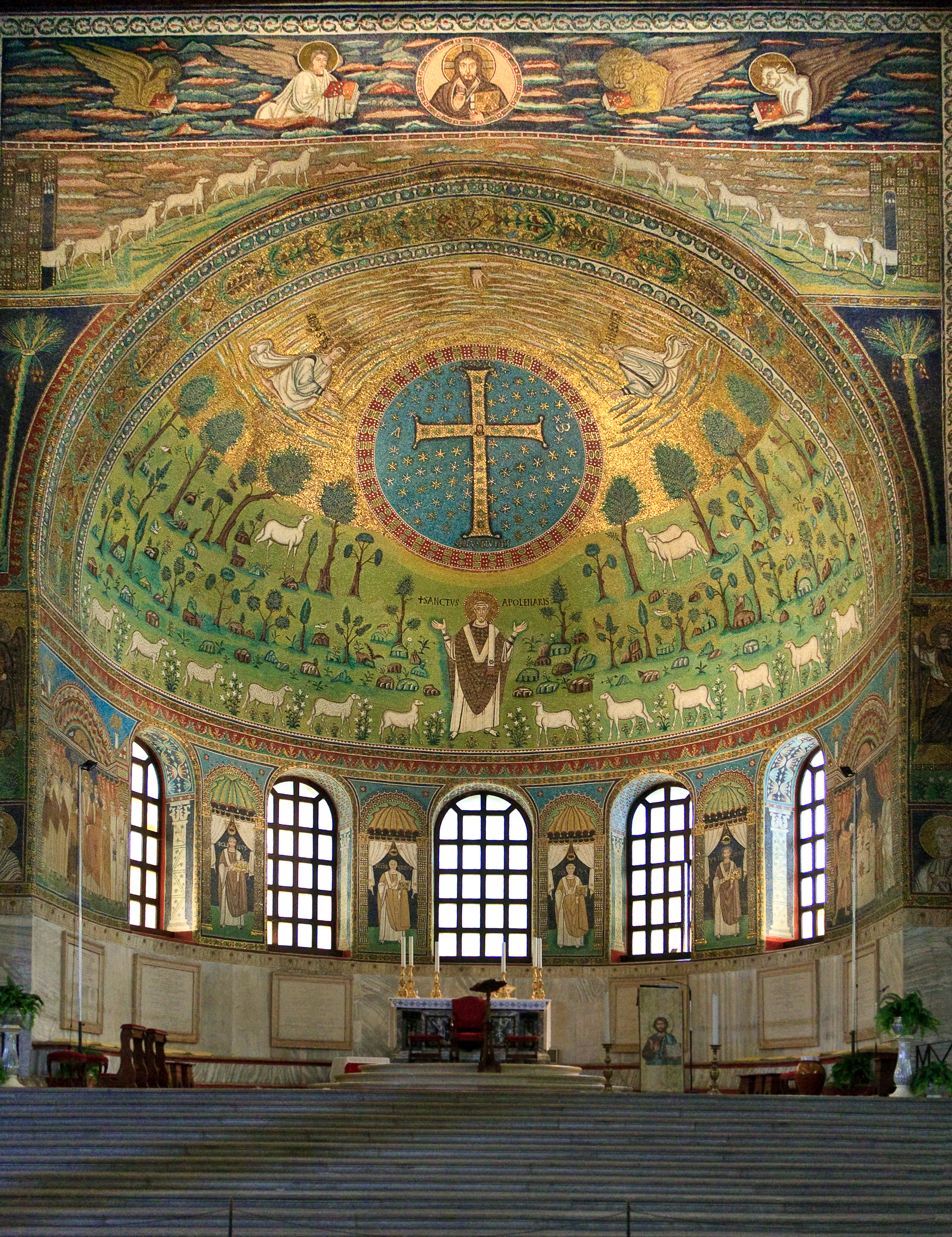
Sant'Apollinare in Classe

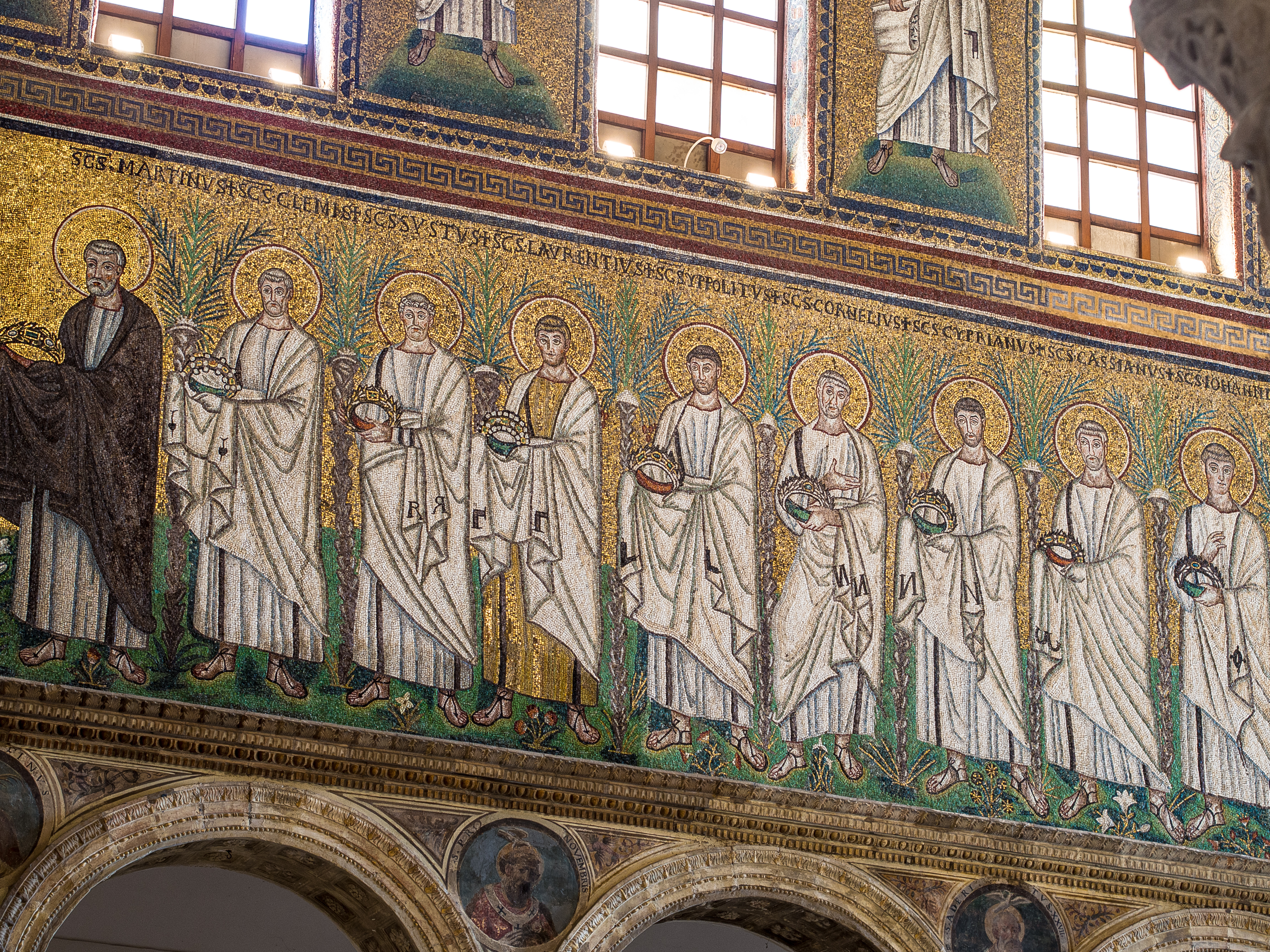
Sant'Apollinare Nuovo

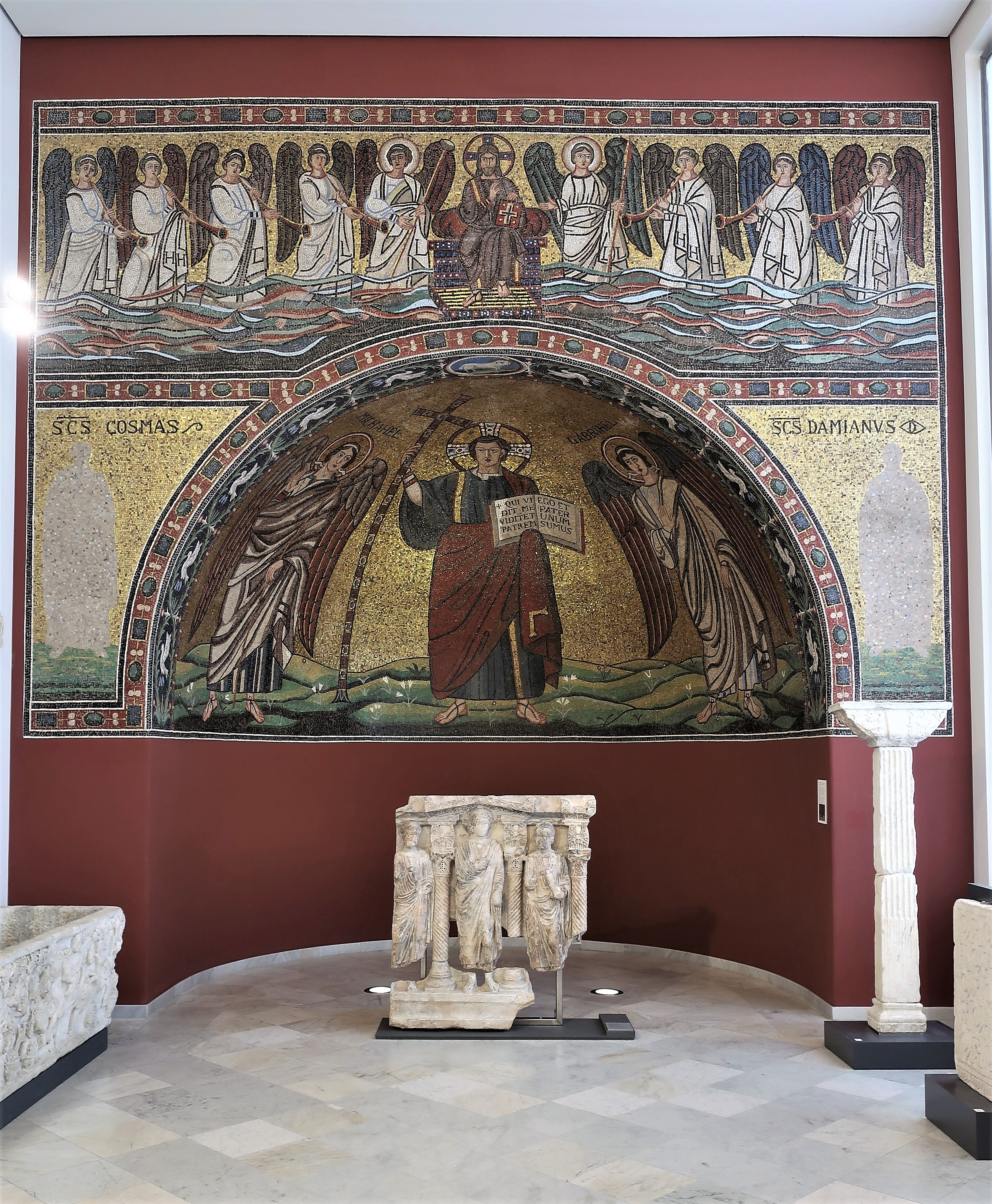
San Michele in Africisco

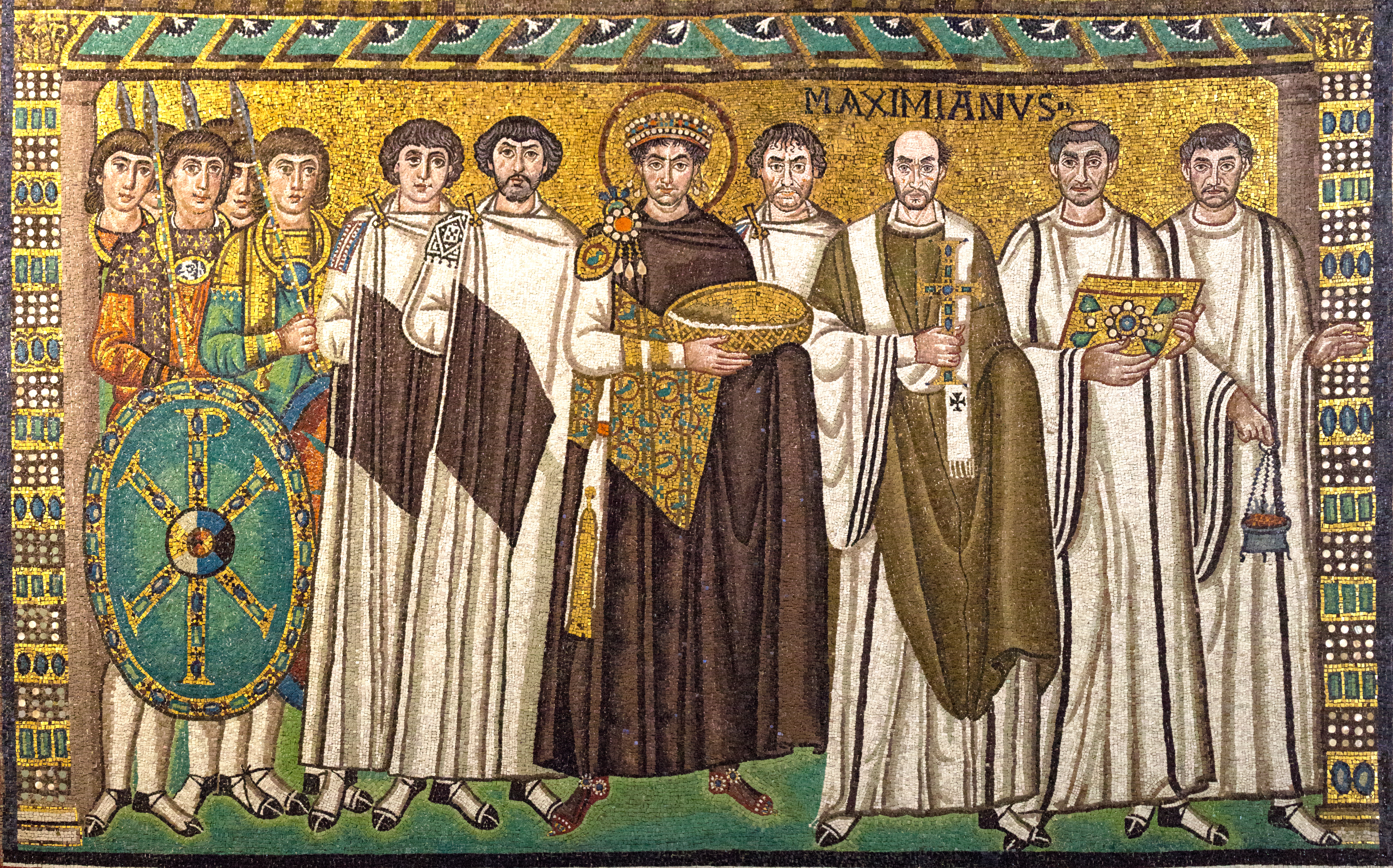
San Vitale

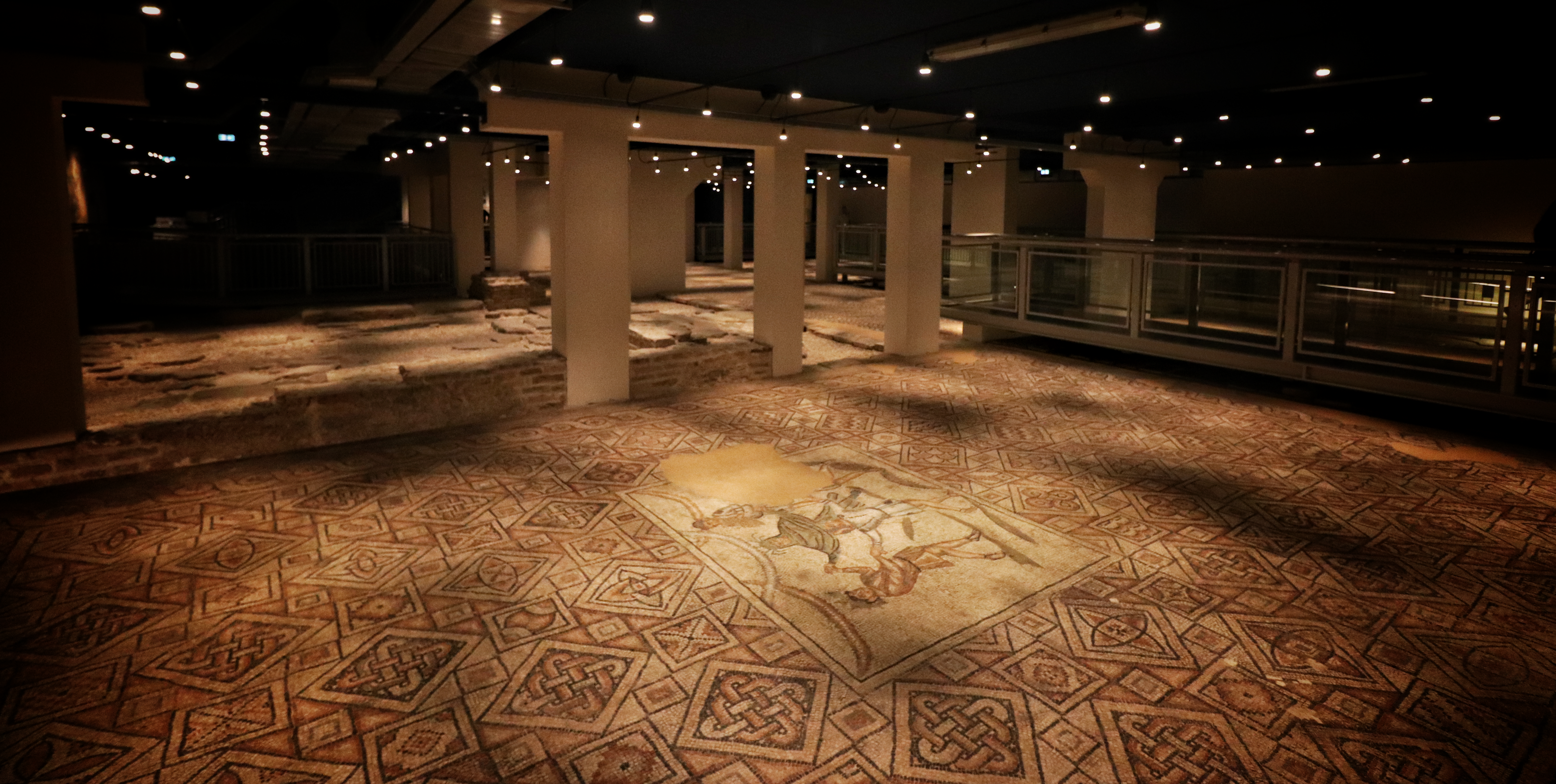
Domus dei Tappeti di Pietra

==== Rome ====
- Santi Cosma e Damiano (526—530)
- San Lorenzo fuori le mura
- Church San Teodoro
- Church of San Martino ai Monti — mosaic portraying Madonna with St Sylvester, above is 1630 copy of it
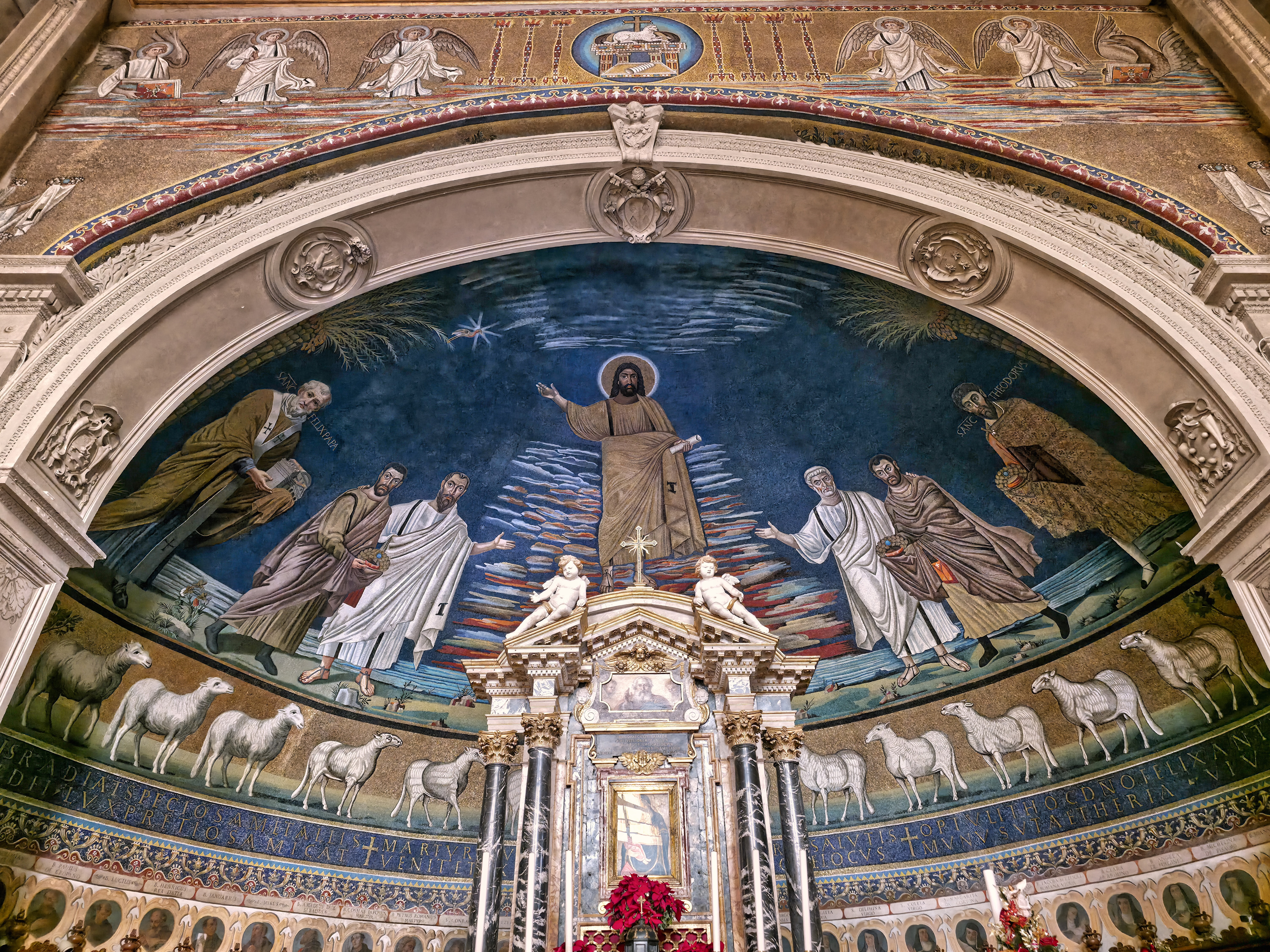
Cosma e Damiano

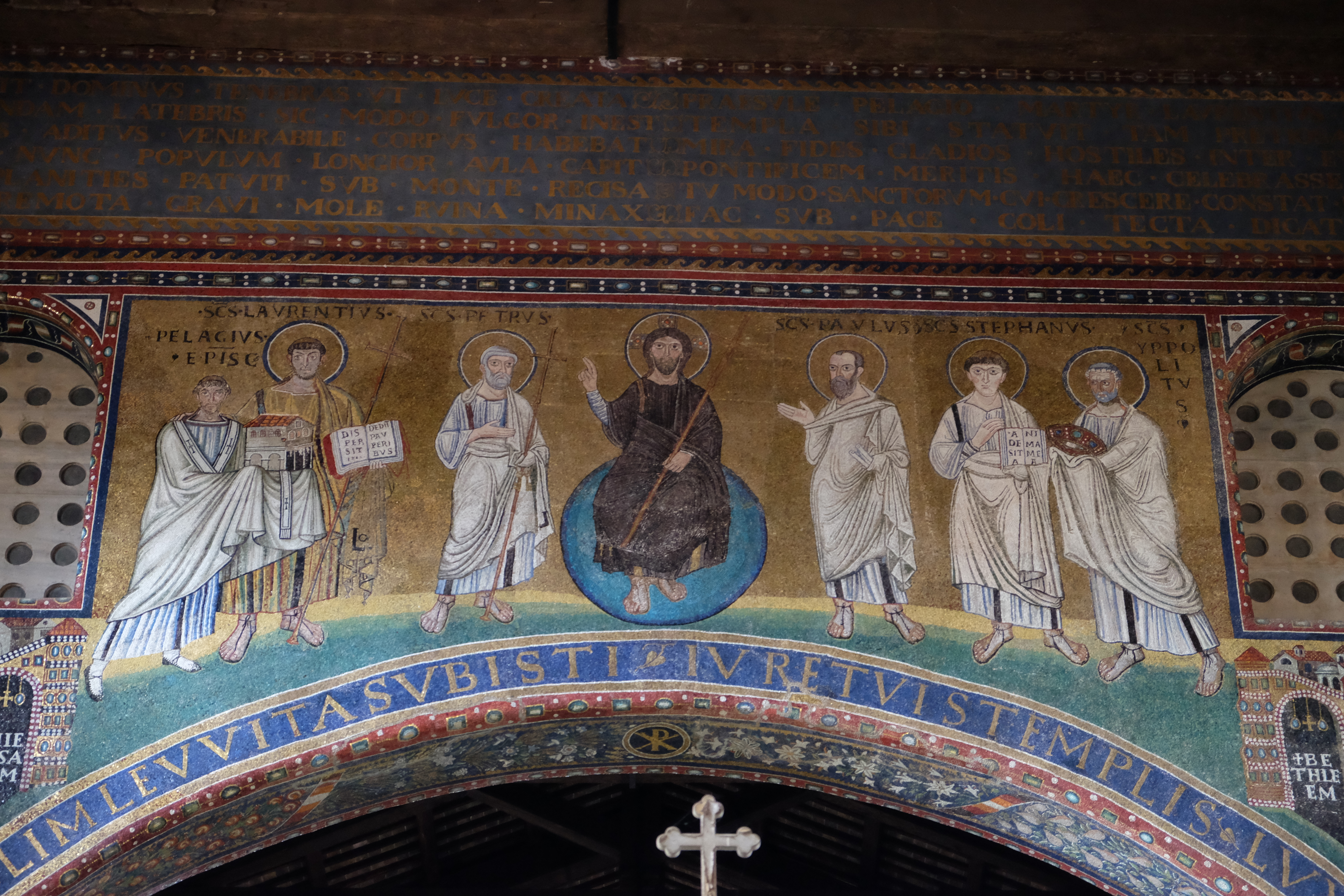
San Lorenzo fuori le mura

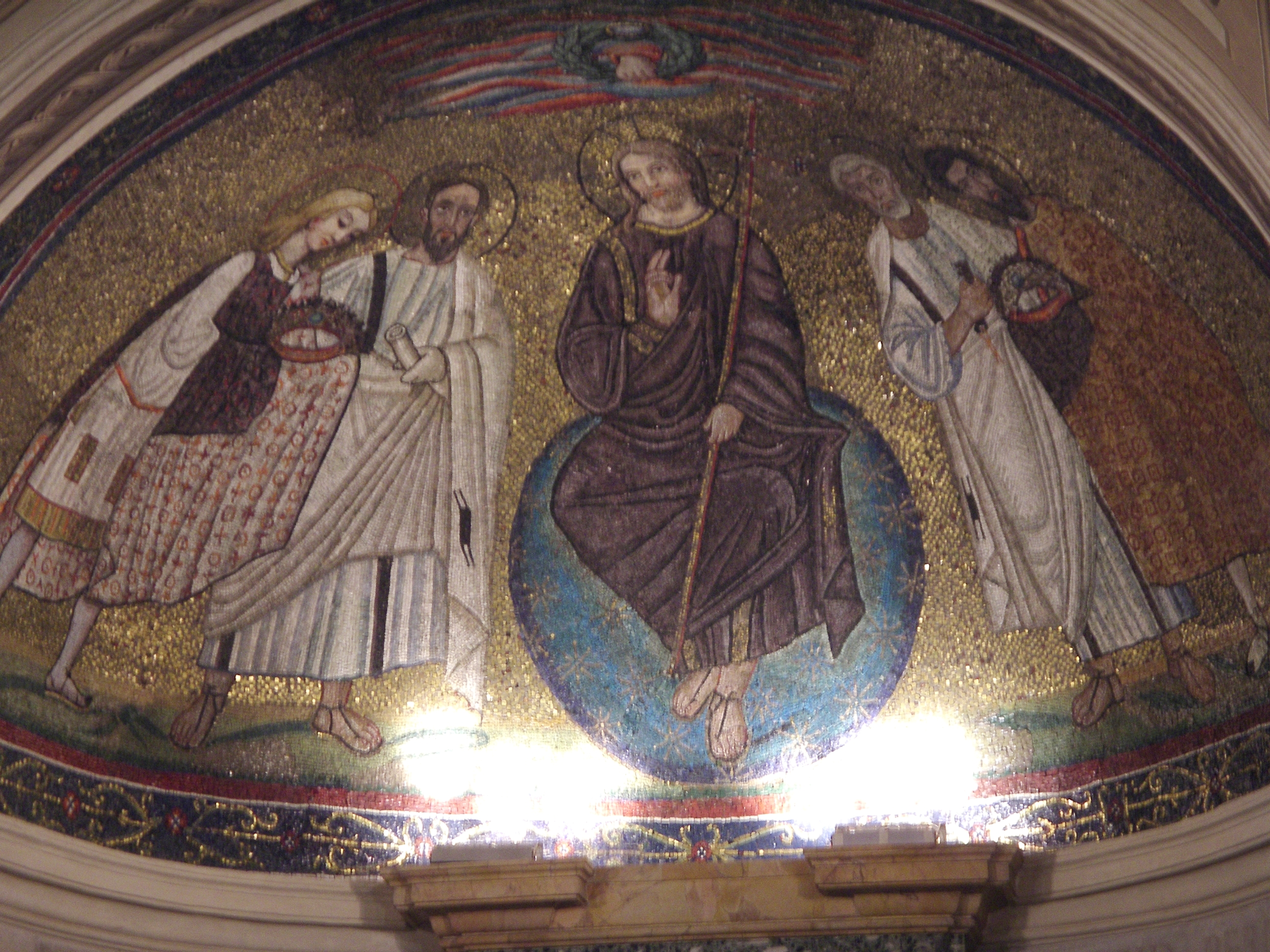
San Teodoro

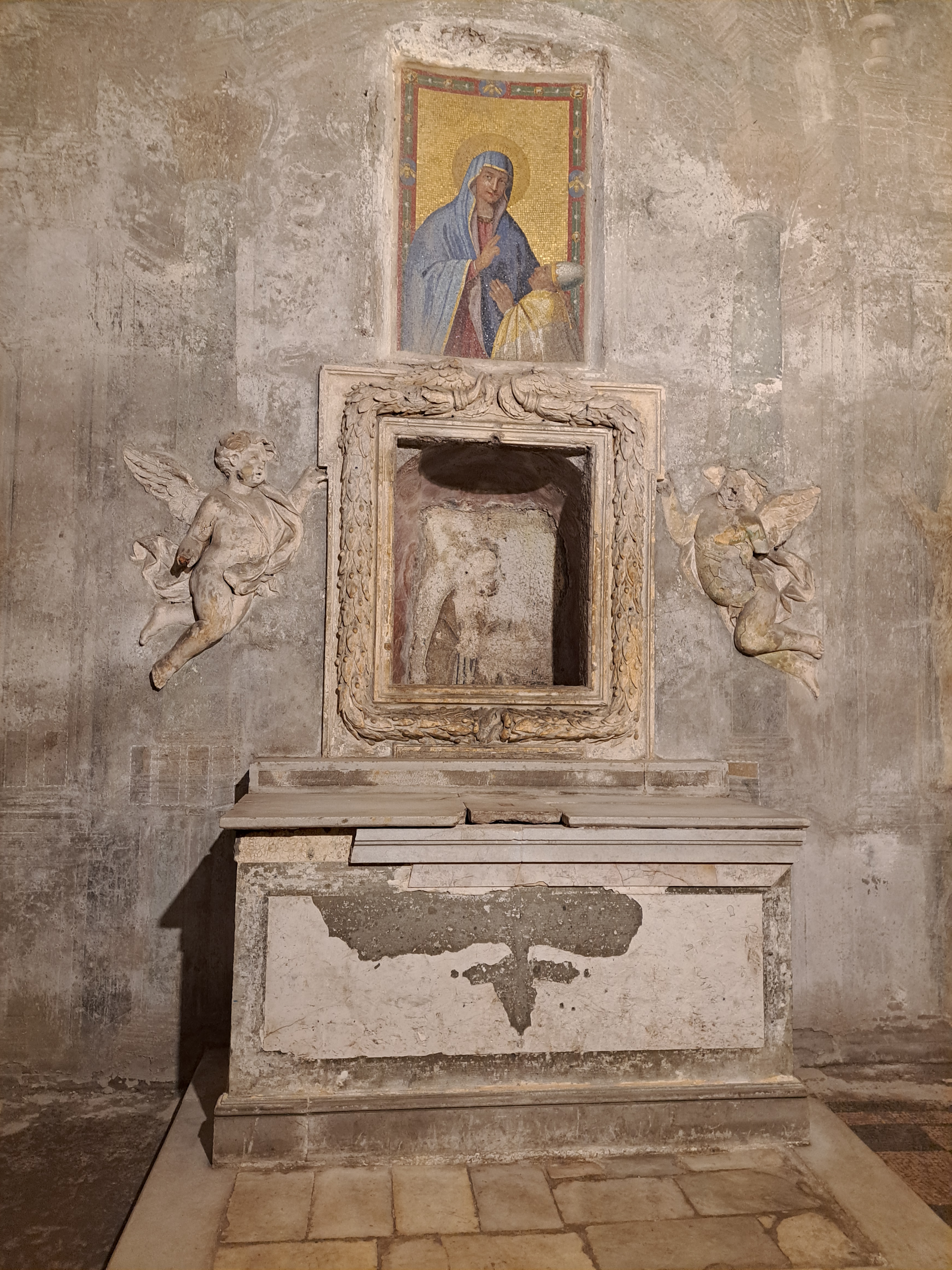
San Martino ai Monti

=== Israel ===
- Beit She'an, Bath house
- Jewish mosaics: Beit She'an, Synagogue Mosaic, (in Israel Museum, Jerusalem)
- Jewish mosaics: Bet Alfa Synagogue National Park, Synagogue Beth Alpha, Israel — floor with zodiac
- 'Jewish mosaics: Western Negev, Maon Synagogue mosaic floors
- Caesarea Maritima, Birds Mosaic (
- Nahariya, Western Galilee, Church of Saint Lazarus — floor
- Jerusalem, «Birds Mosaic» / Armenian Mosaic at Damascus Gate, now in Armenian museum
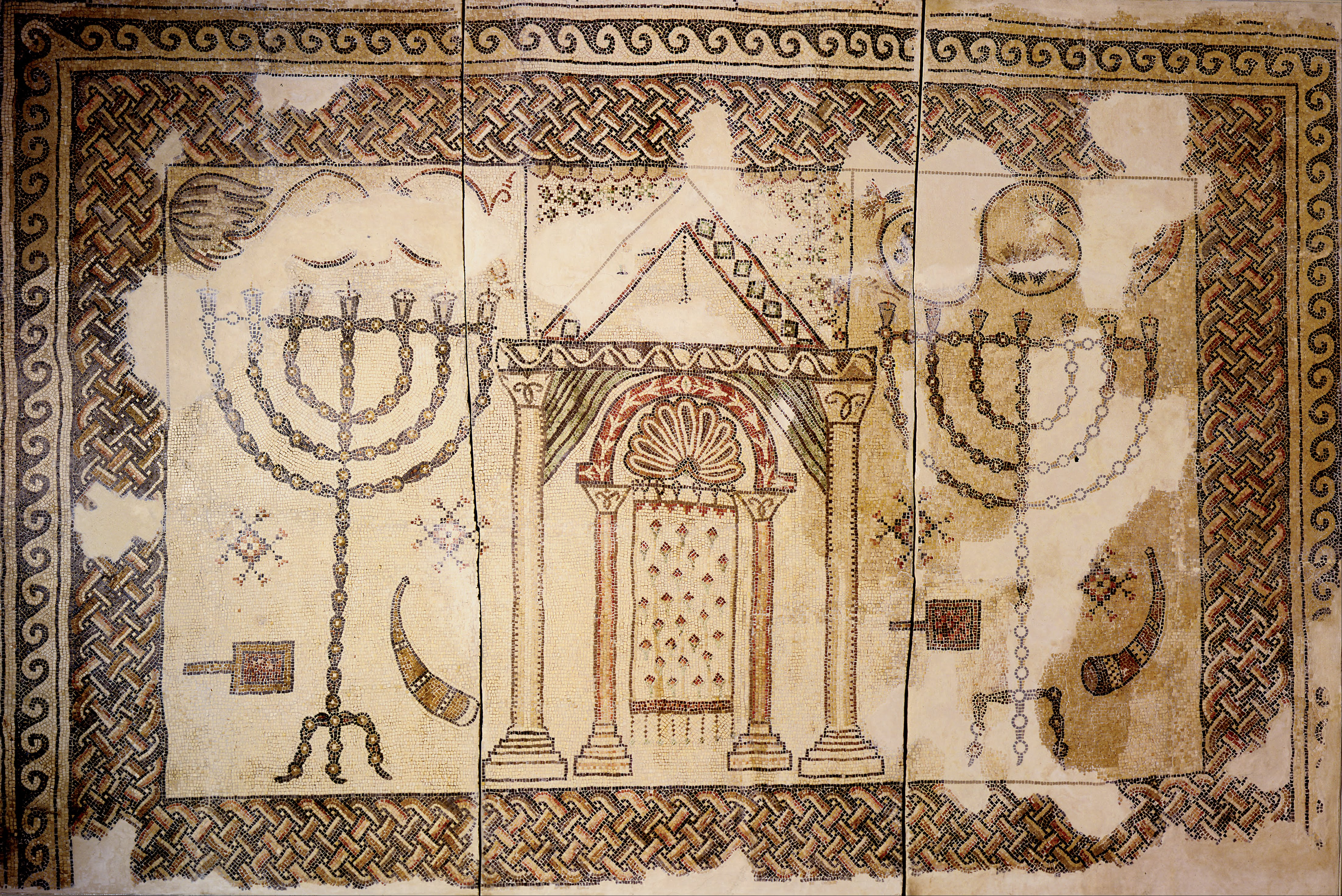
Bet She’an

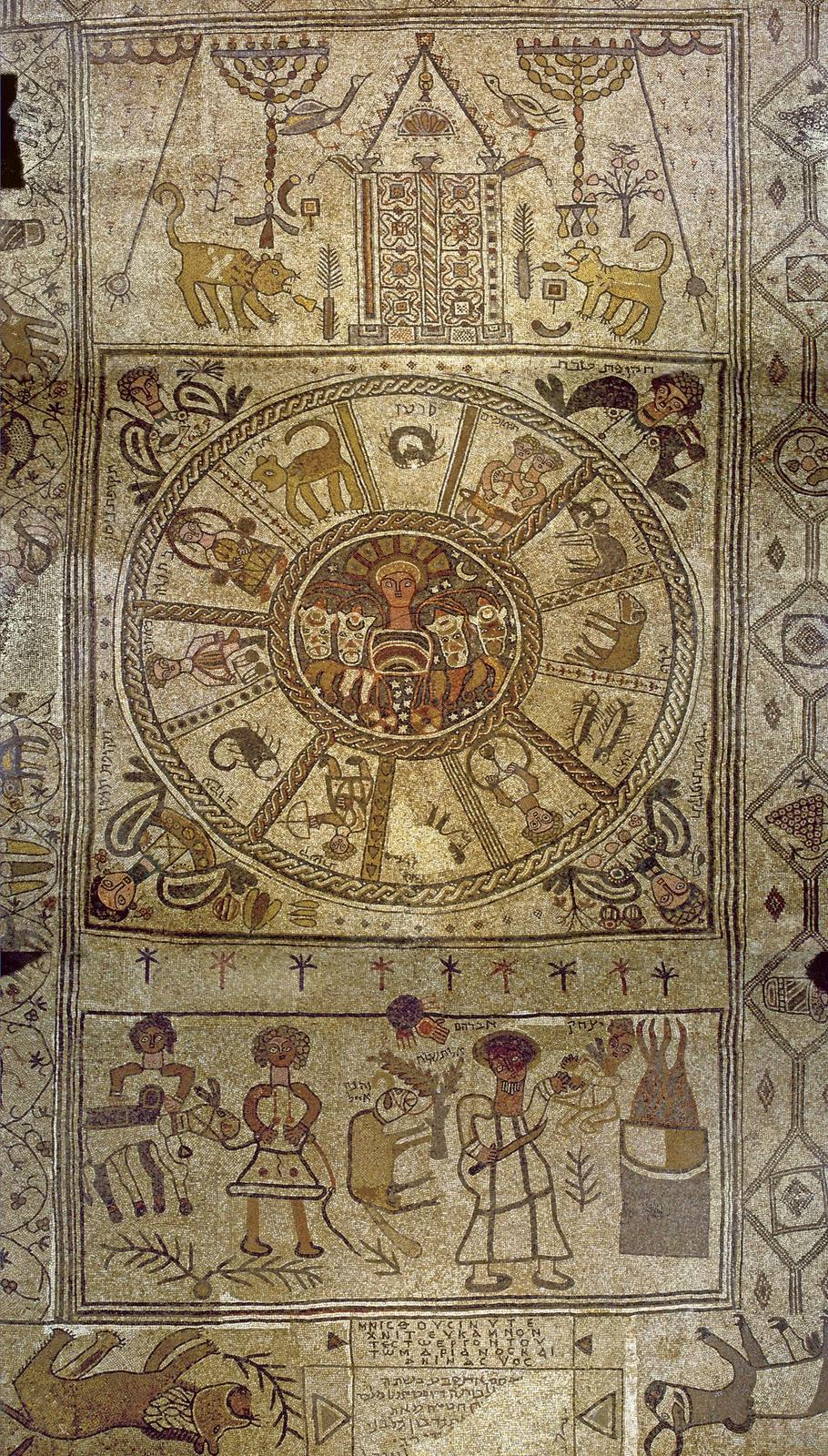
Beth Alpha

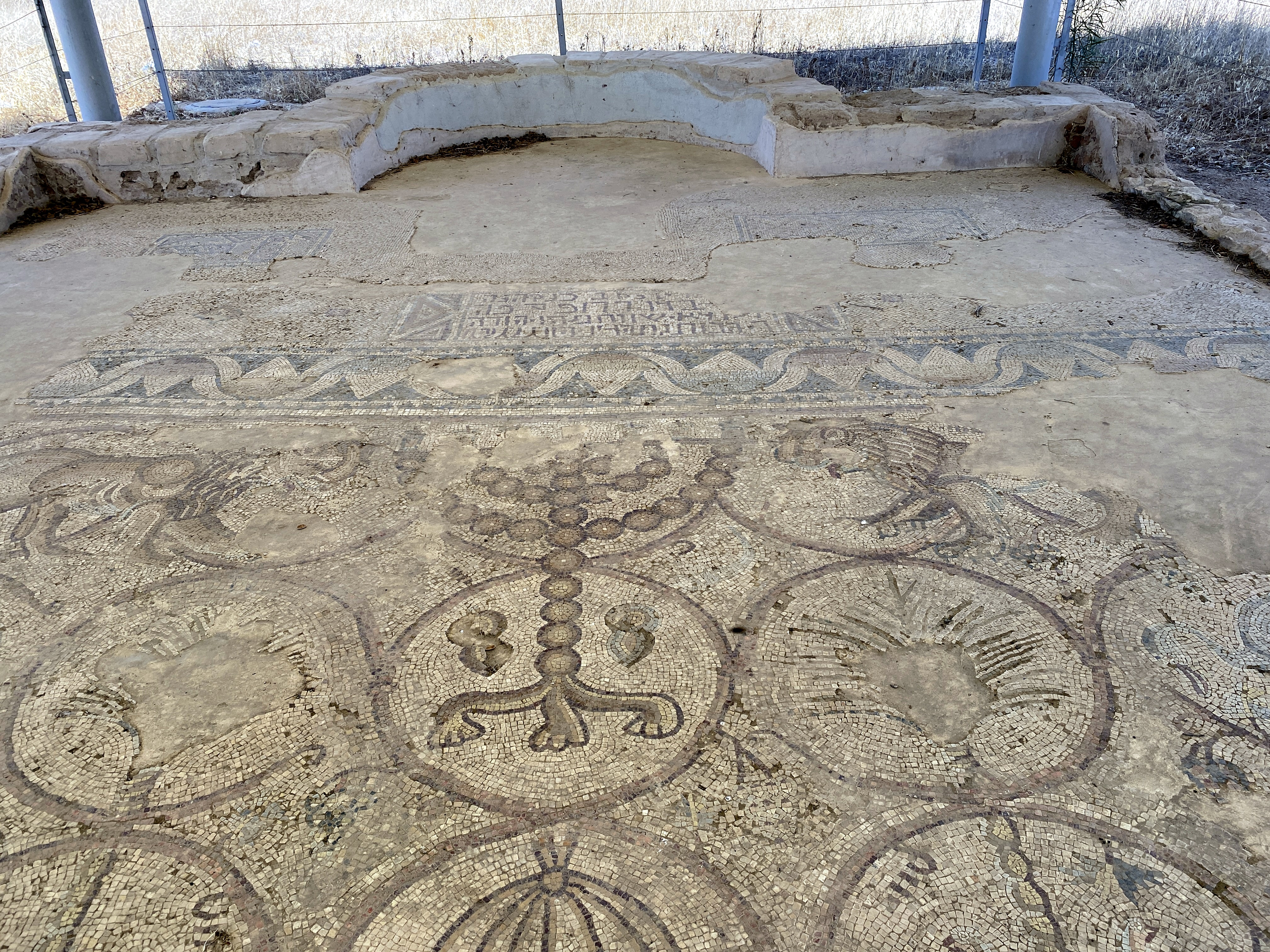
Maon

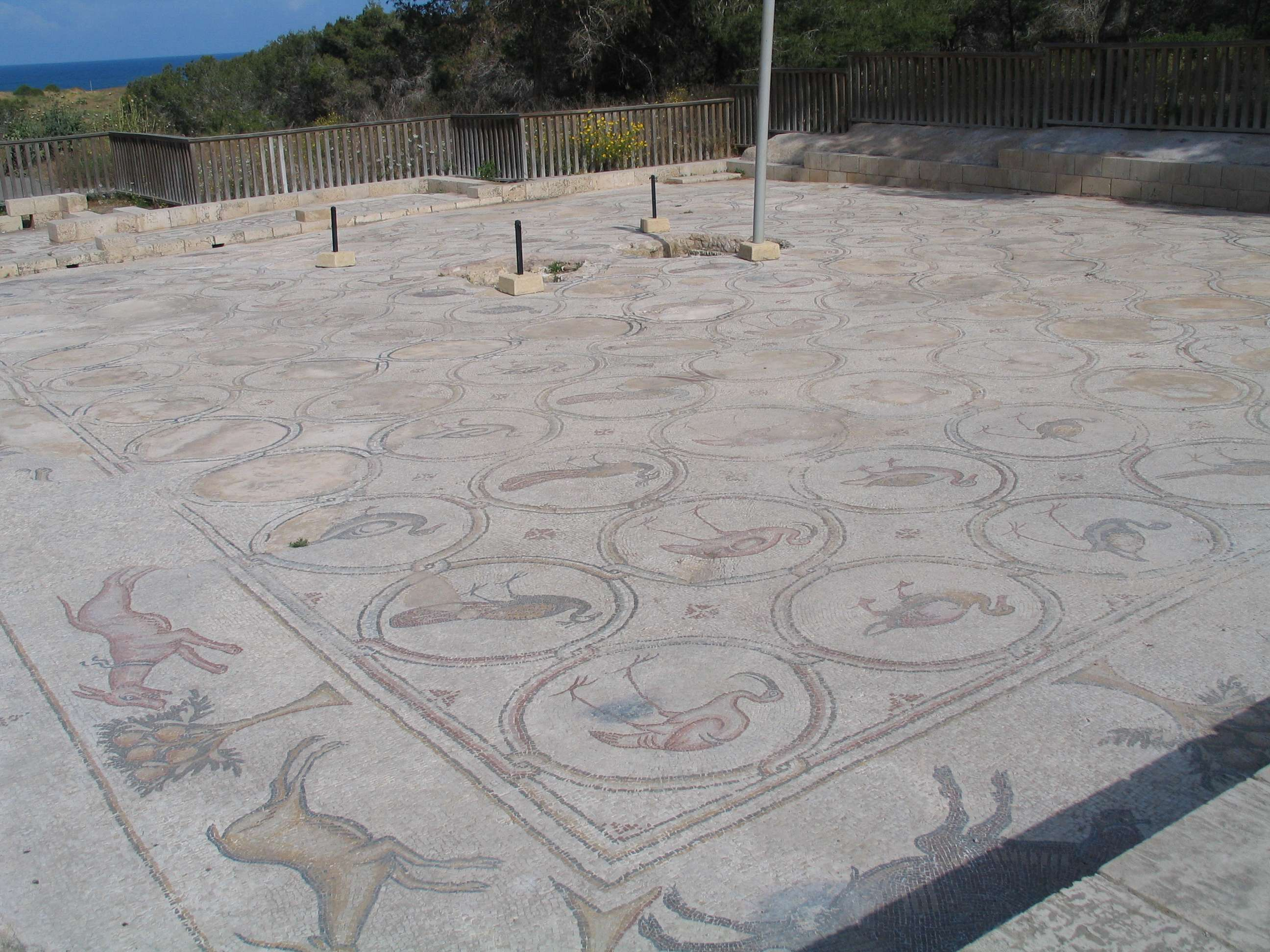
Birds Mosaic (Caesarea)

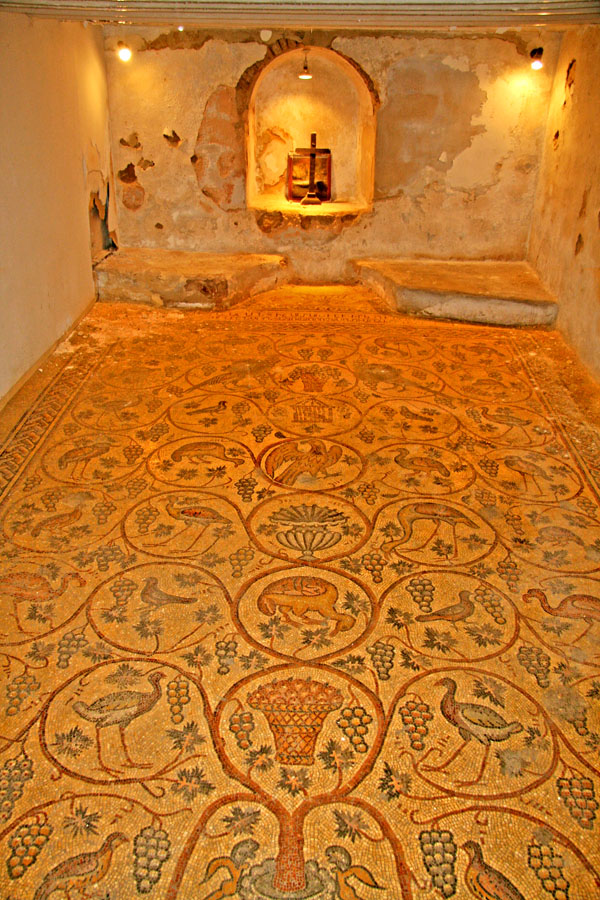
Armenian Mosaic

=== Jordan ===
- Gerasa (Jerash), Church of Cosmas and Damian (533) — figurative mosaic floor
- Madaba, Church of Moses, Mount Nebo — Diakonikon Baptistry floor
- Madaba, Mosaic «Madaba Map», floor mosaic from church of Saint George (ar)
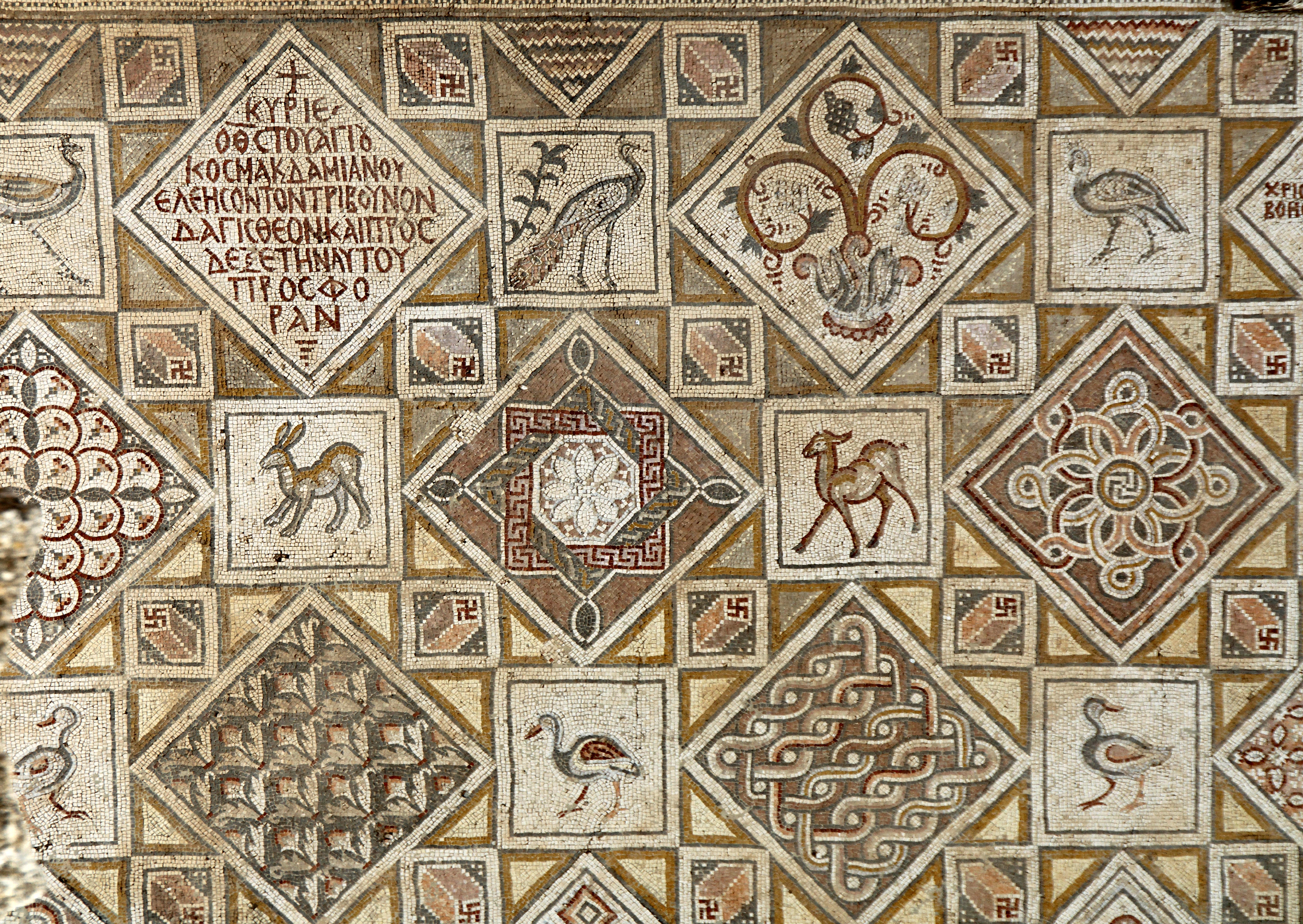
Church of Cosmas and Damian, Jerash

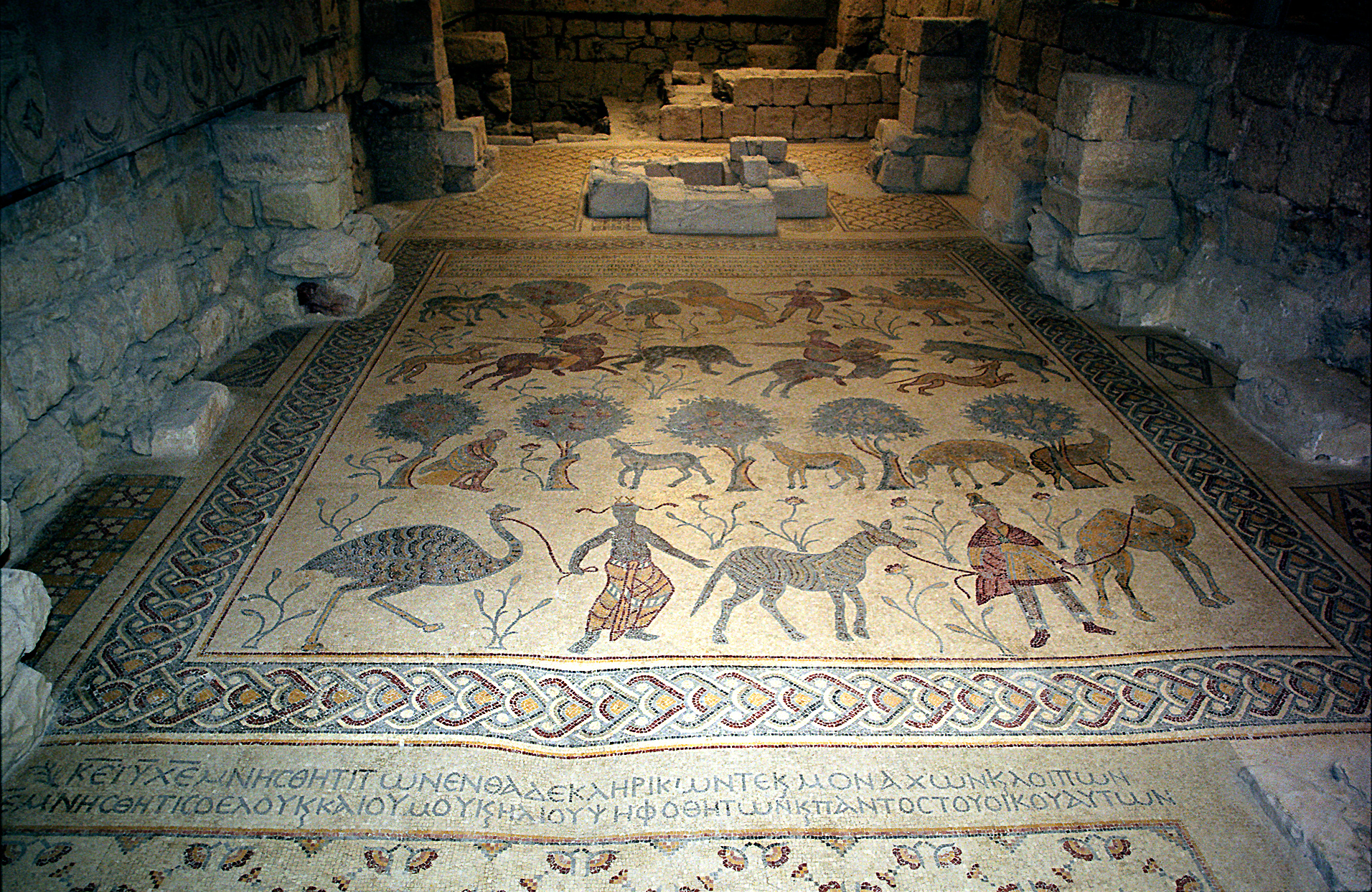
Moses' church, Madaba

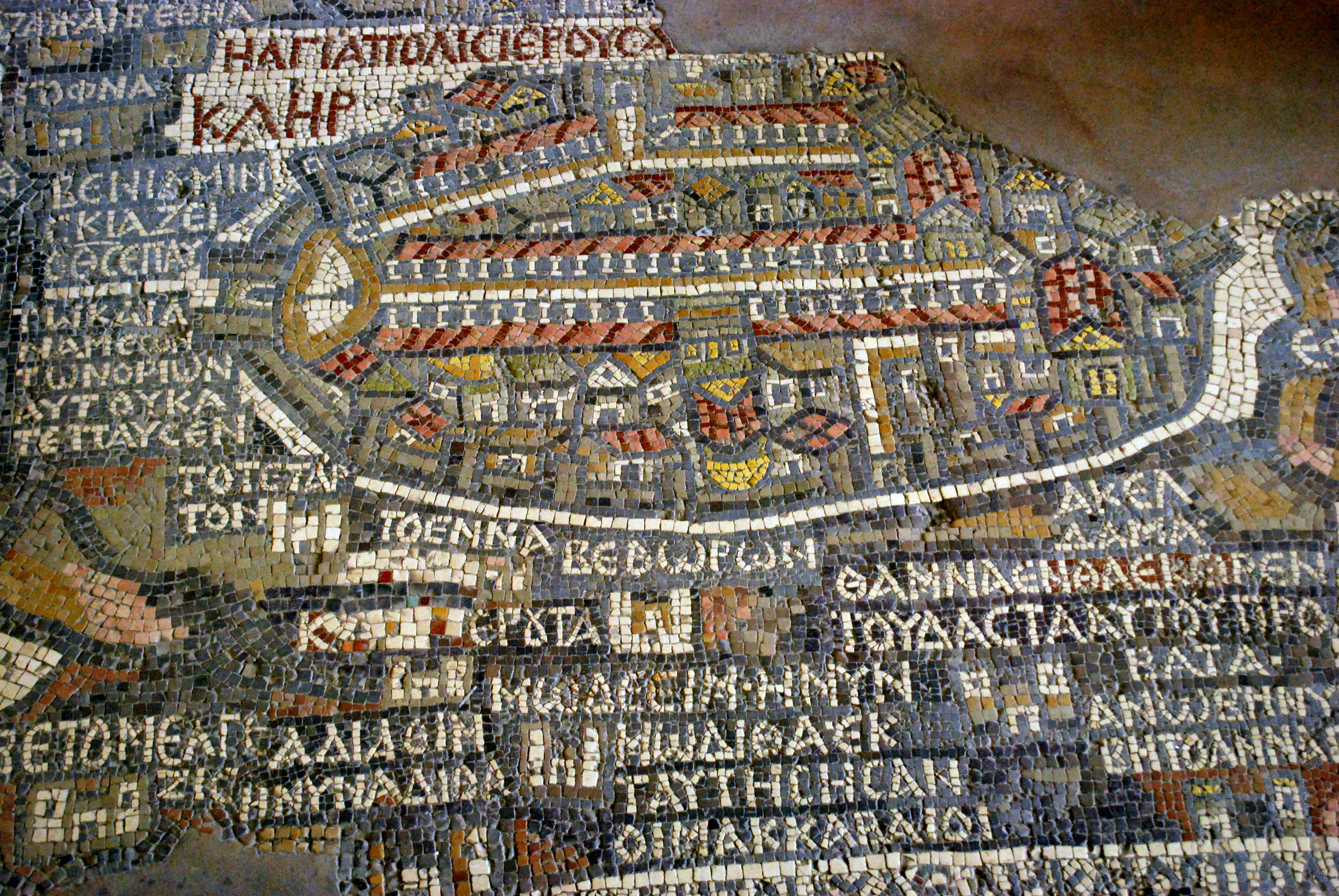
Madaba map

=== Levant ===
- Jewish mosaics: Gaza (Palestine), Gaza synagogue mosaics — floors, now in Museum of the Good Samaritan (West Bank)
- Iraq, Palace in Ctesiphon
- Mount Sinai (Egypt), Saint Catherine's Monastery
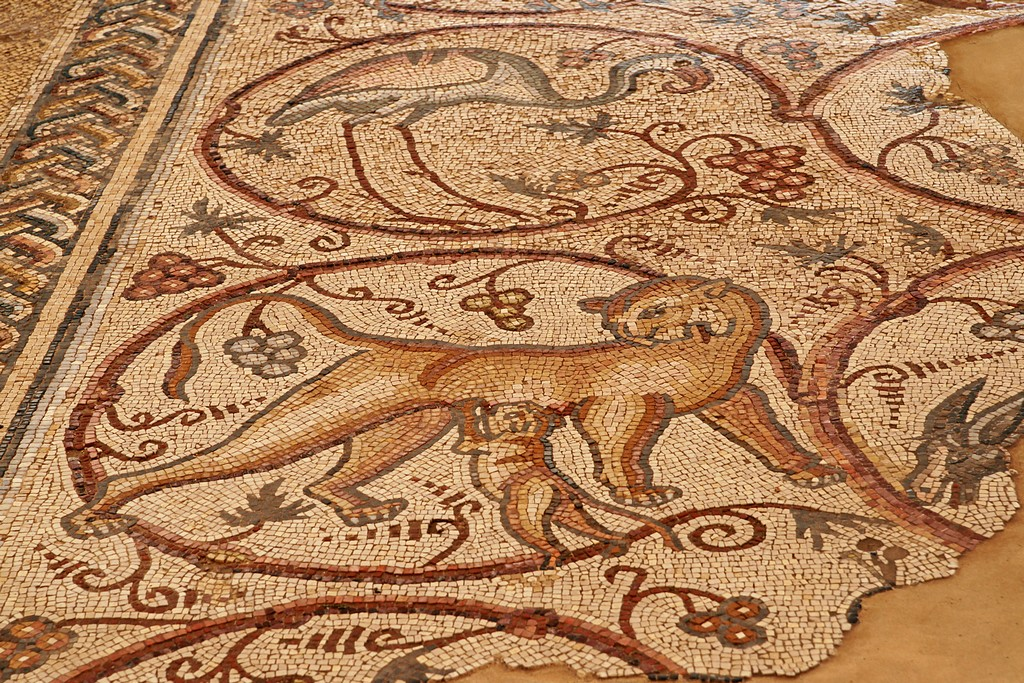
Gaza

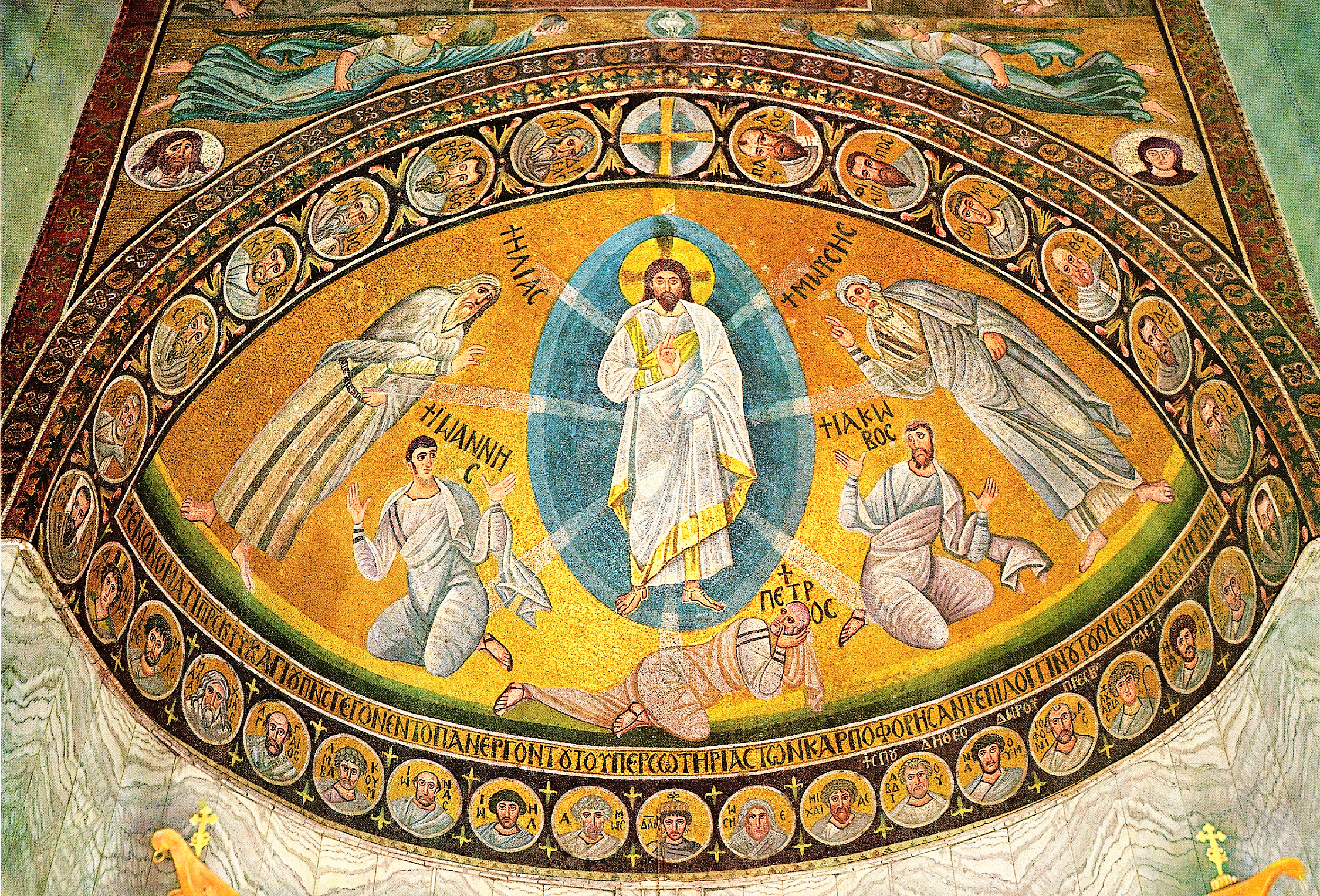
Sinai

=== Spain, Cordoba ===
- es:Basílica de San Vicente Mártir — floor
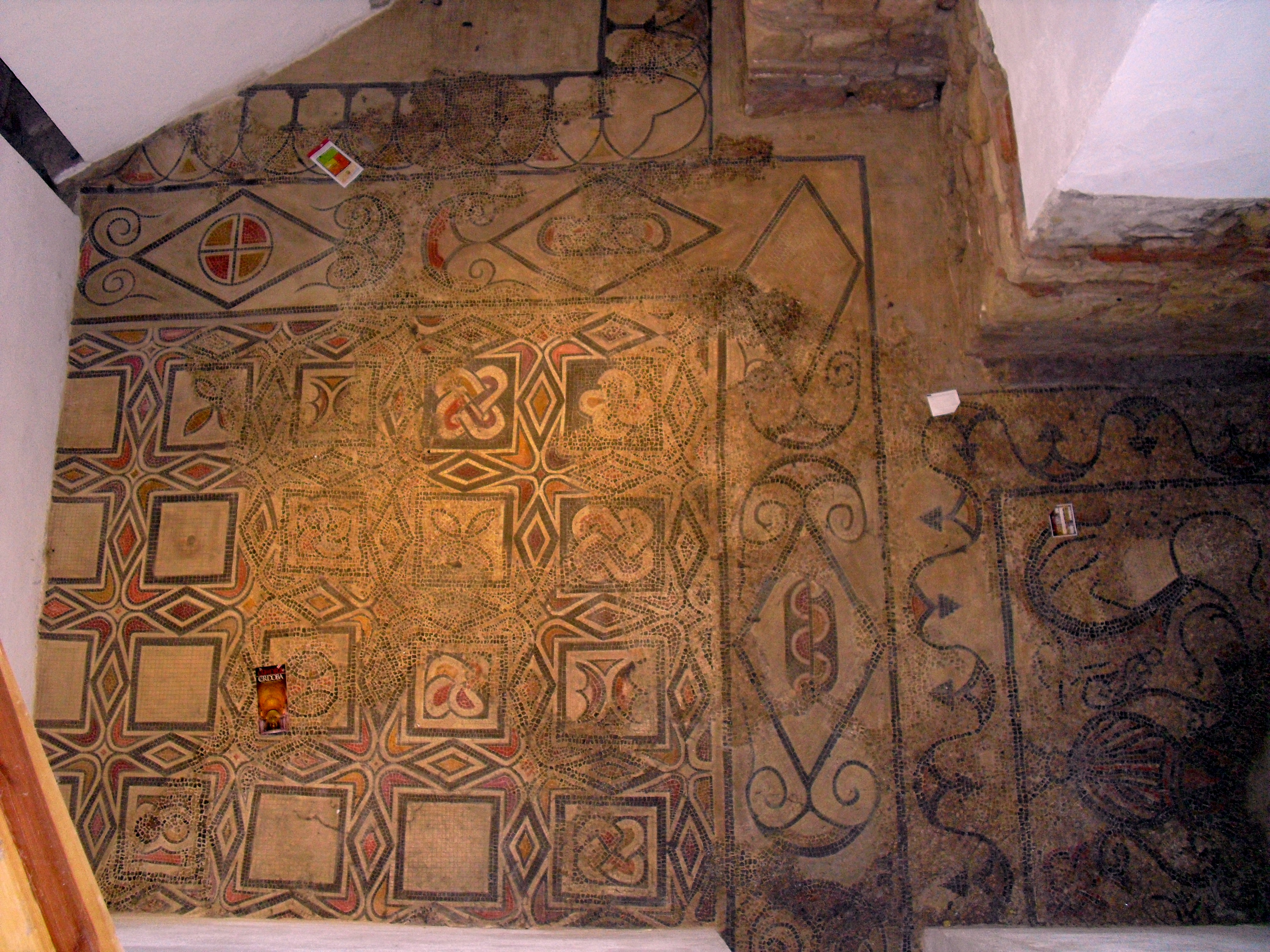

=== Tunisia ===
- Baptistery of Bekalta (6–7th centuries) — baptismal basin now in Sousse Archaeological Museum
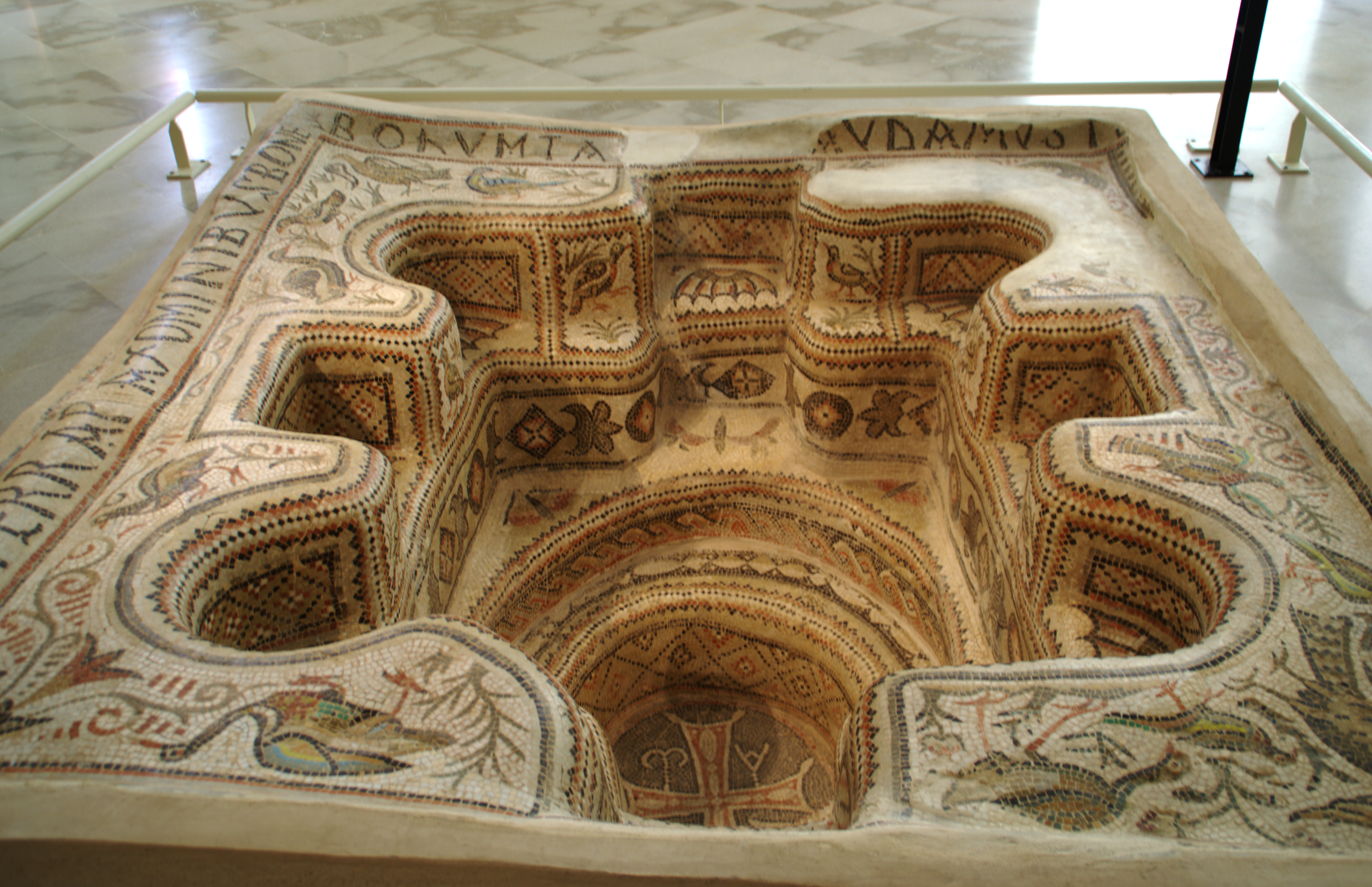
Bekalta

=== Turkey ===
- Istanbul, Hagia Sophia — all surviving mosaics from this period are ornamental and are located in the narthex, naves, galleries and the main arch.
- Istanbul, Church of Hagia Irene — some fragments of 6th century (?)
- Istanbul, Church of Theotokos Kyriotissa (Kalenderhane Mosque) — mosaic «Presentation of Christ», the only pre-iconoclastic exemplar of a religious subject surviving in the city (now in Istanbul Archaeology Museums)
- Istanbul, Church of St. Polyeuctus- fragments found in ruins
- Eskipazar, Hadrianopolis in Paphlagonia, Churches — floors, with depictions of rivers, etc.
- Kartmin, Tur ‘Abdin, Mor Gabriel Monastery — mosaics here in altar part of main church and in Saint Catherine’s Monastery on Mount Sinai are the only surviving 6th-century Byzantine wall mosaics located to the east of Constantinople.
- Sagalassos, Basilica
- Worcester Hunt Mosaic from Antioch (now in museum in Massachusetts)
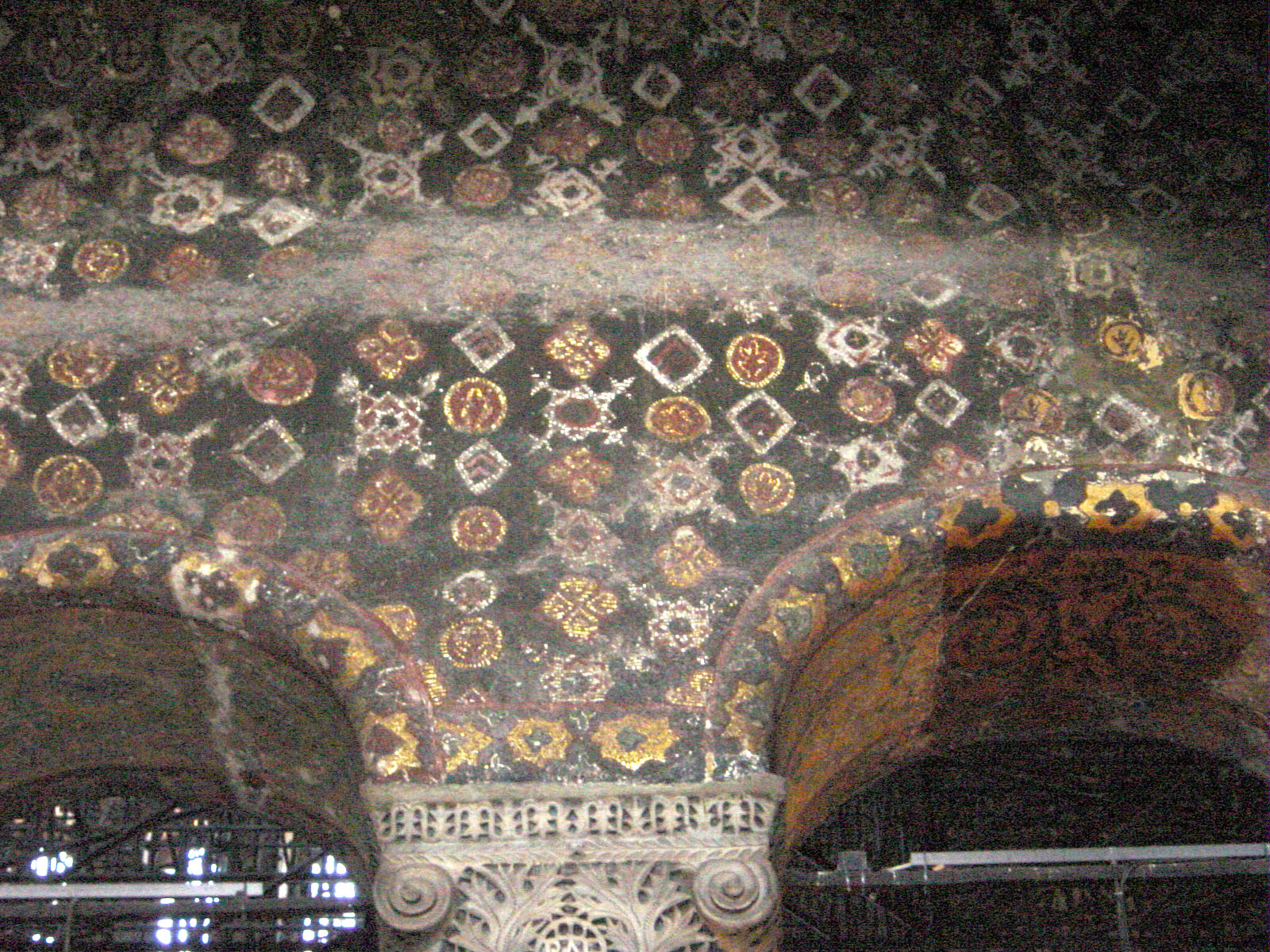
Hagia Sophia

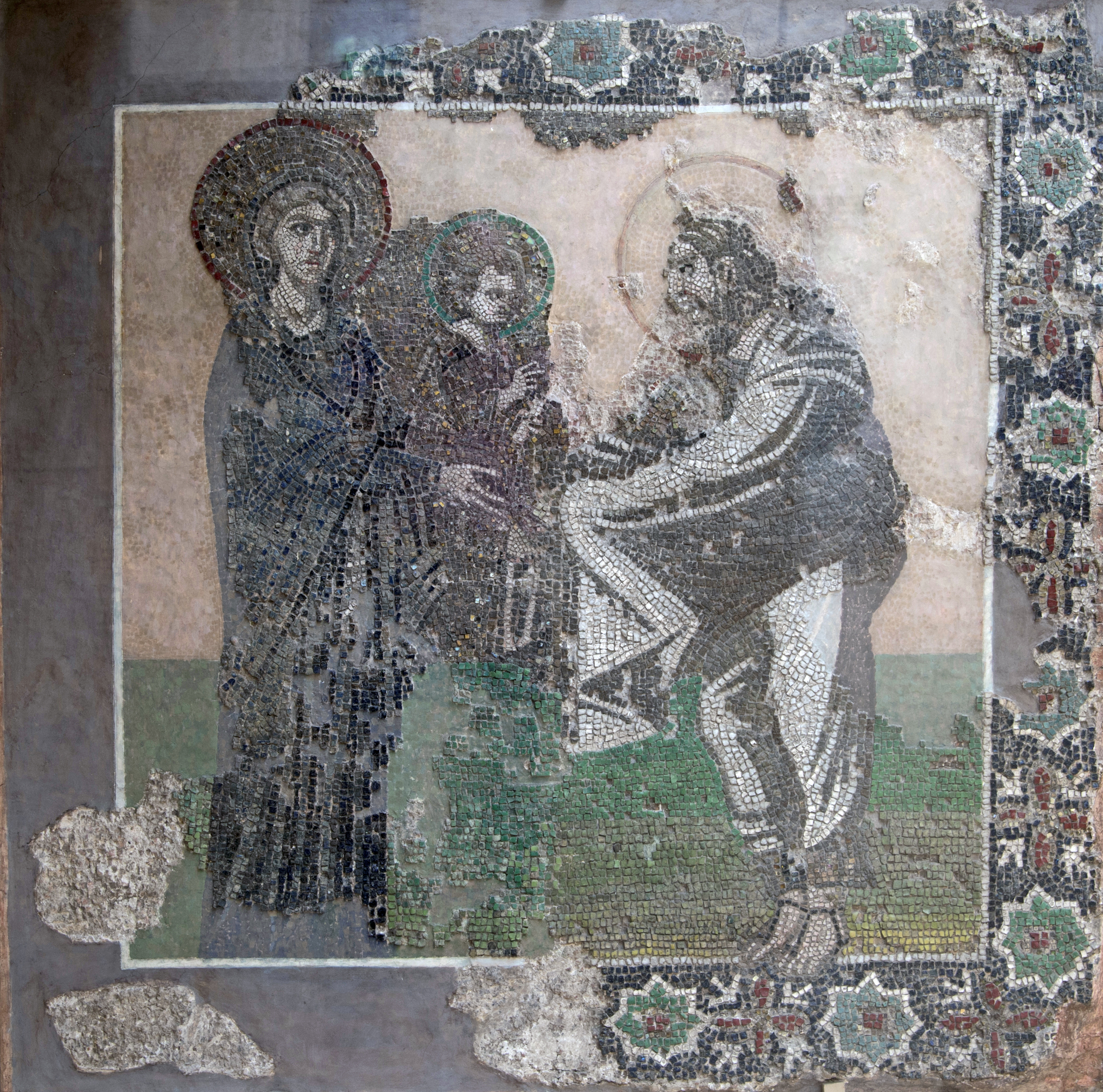
Kalenderhane

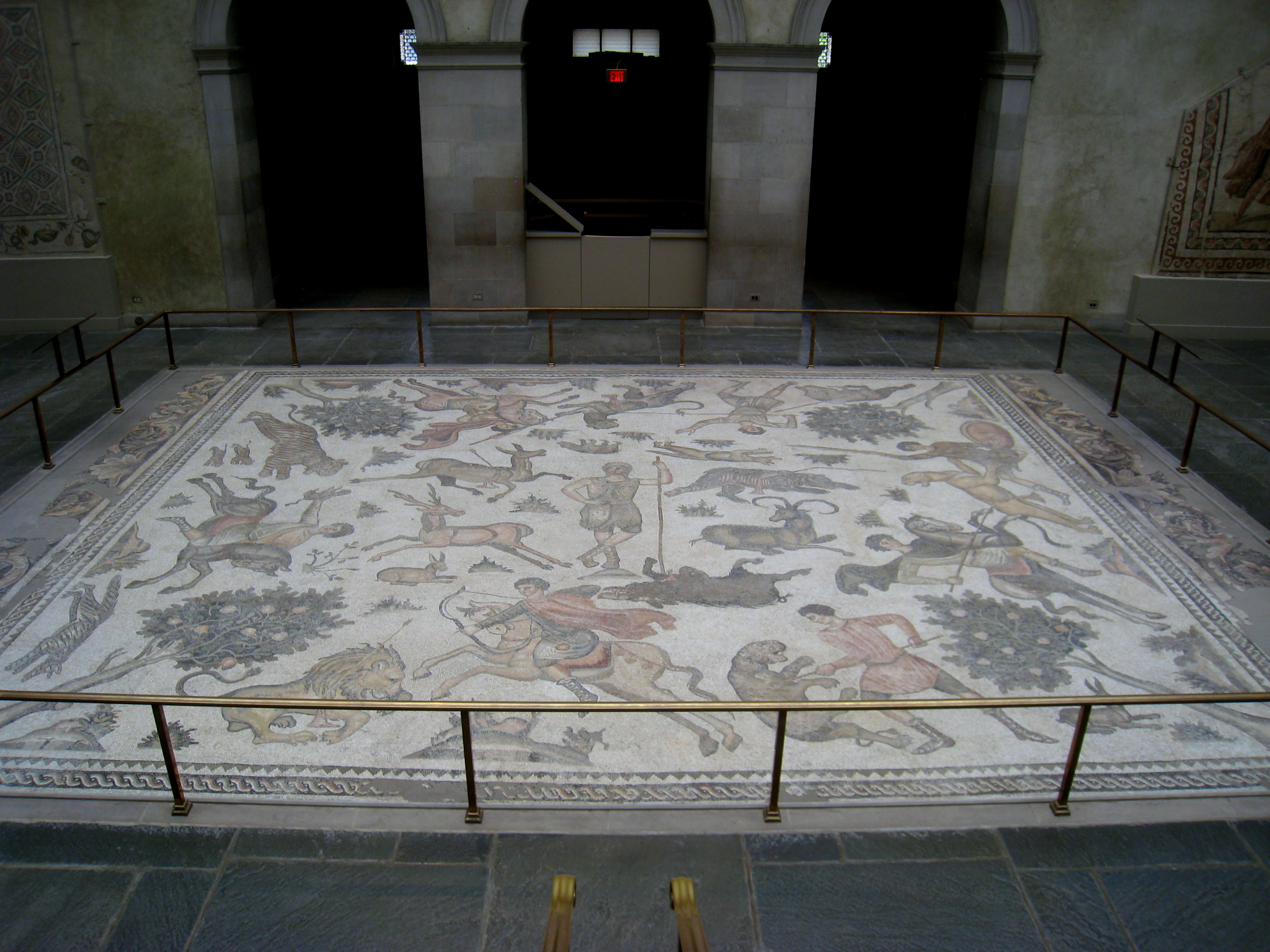
Worcester Hunt Mosaic

=== Yemen ===
- Sanaa, Al-Qalis Church (destroyed church) — mentioned in chronicles.

== 7th century ==
=== Albania ===
- Dyrrachium (Durrës), Amphitheatre chapel, Amphitheatre of Durrës (7th–11th)
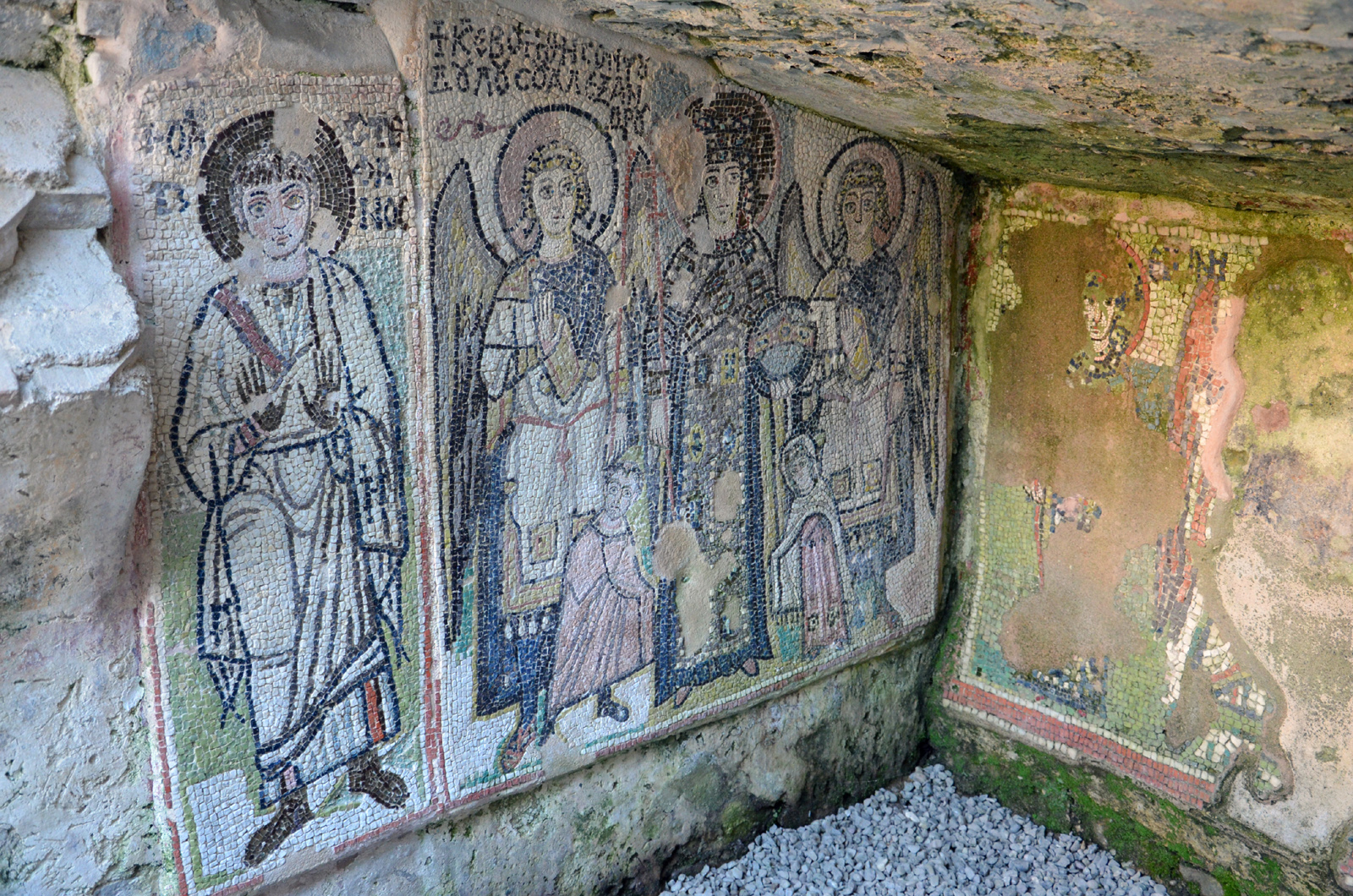
Dyrrachium

=== Armenia ===
- Etchmiadzin, Zvartnots Cathedral — some tiles survived, in museum

=== Cyprus ===
- Kopetra, Church, Katalymmata ton Plakoton

=== Georgia ===
- C’romi / Tsromi (hy), Church of the Ascension — in 1932 the mosaic fragments were removed and transferred to the Metekhi Museum (presently — Shalva Amiranashvili State Art Museum of the Georgian National Museum)

=== Greece, Thessaloniki ===
- Hagios Demetrios
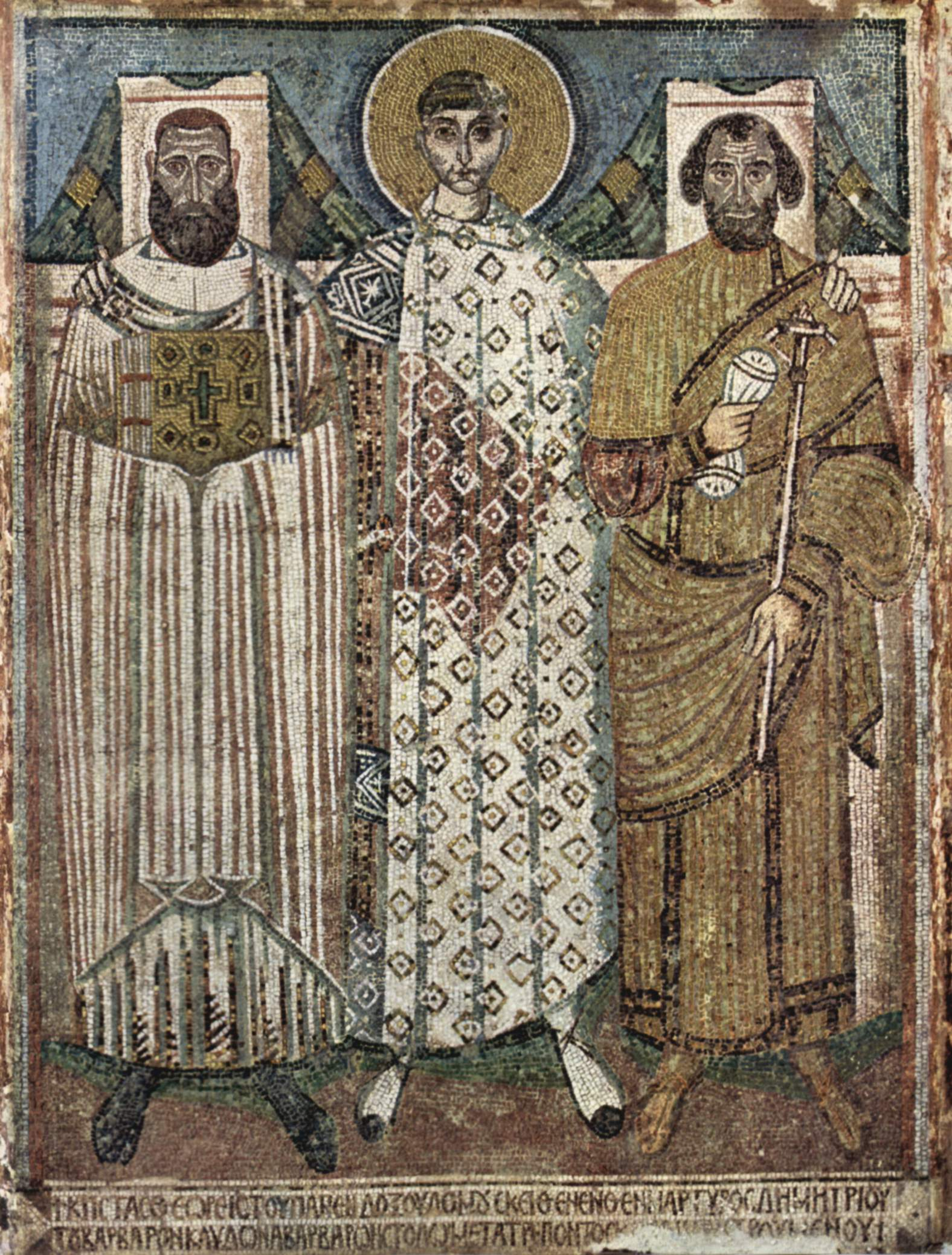
Hagios Demetrios

=== Palestine ===
Islamic mosaics:

- Khirbet Minya, Palace Khirbet Minya / Qasr al-Minya (7th–8th) — floors
- Jerusalem, Dome of the Rock
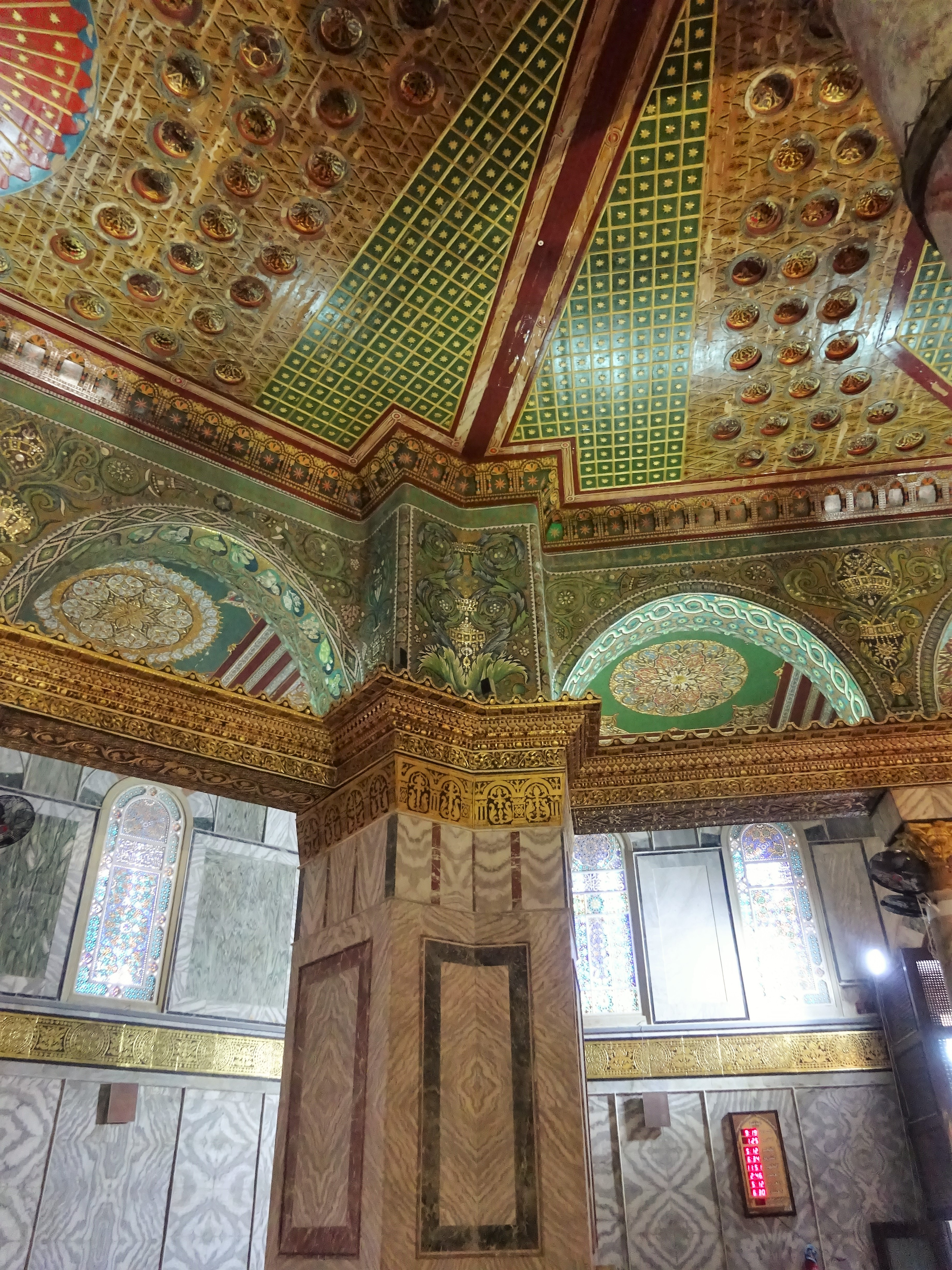
Dome of the Rock

=== Italy, Rome ===
- Sant'Agnese fuori le mura (625—638)
- Chapel of San Venanzio, Lateran Baptistery
- San Pietro in Vincoli — panel with image of Saint Stephan
- Santo Stefano al Monte Celio (S. Stefano Rotondo)
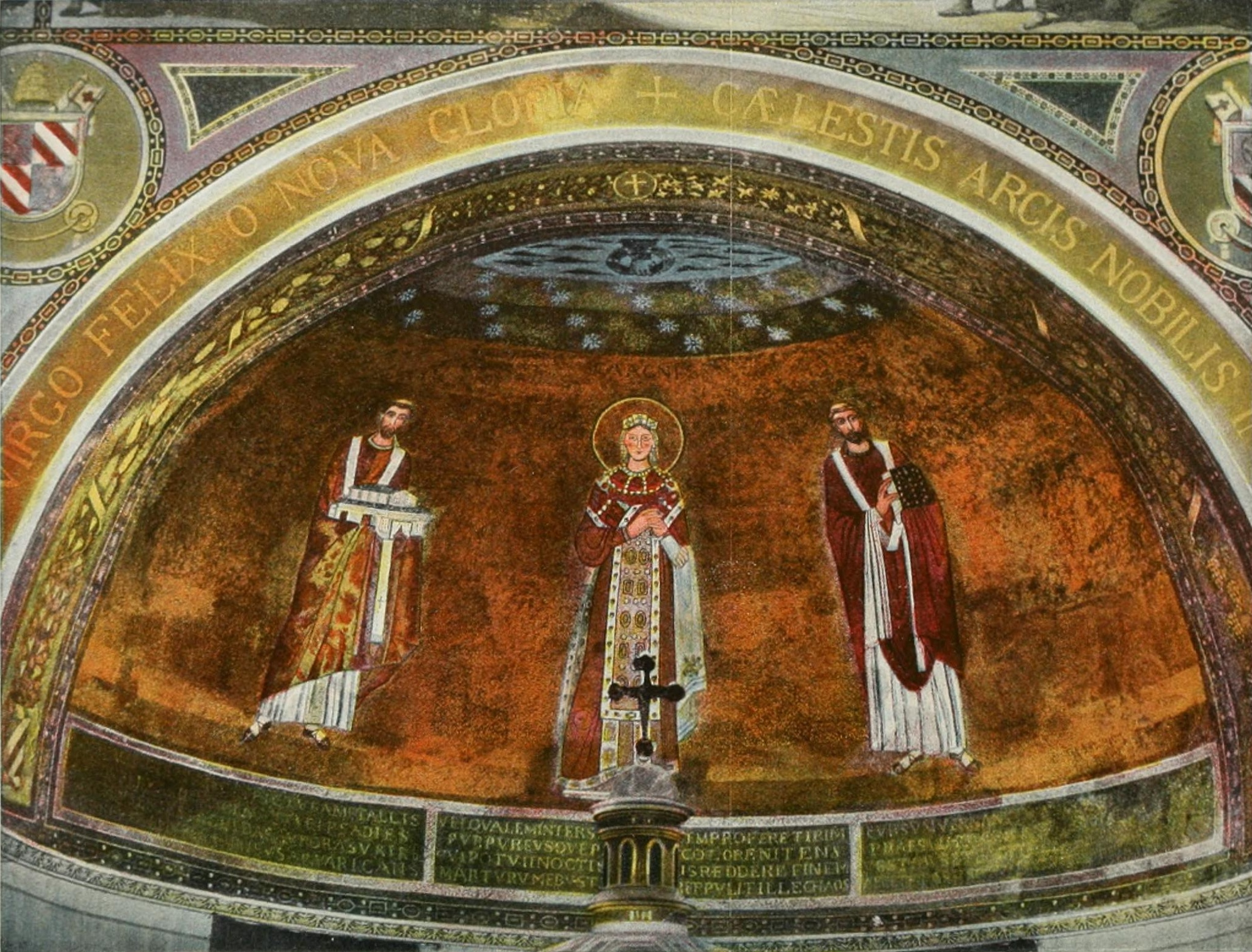
Sant'Agnese fuori le mura

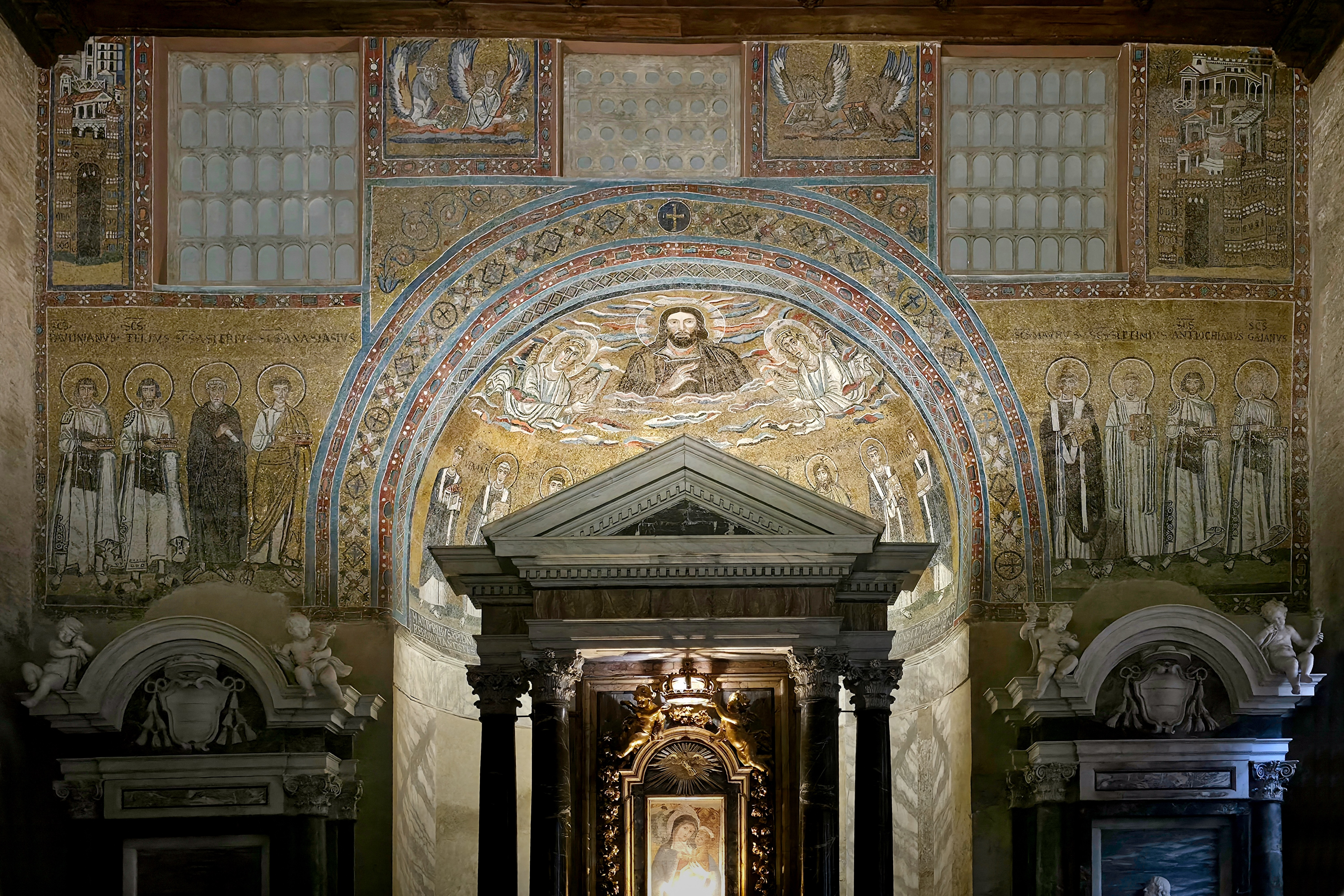
San Venanzio Chapel

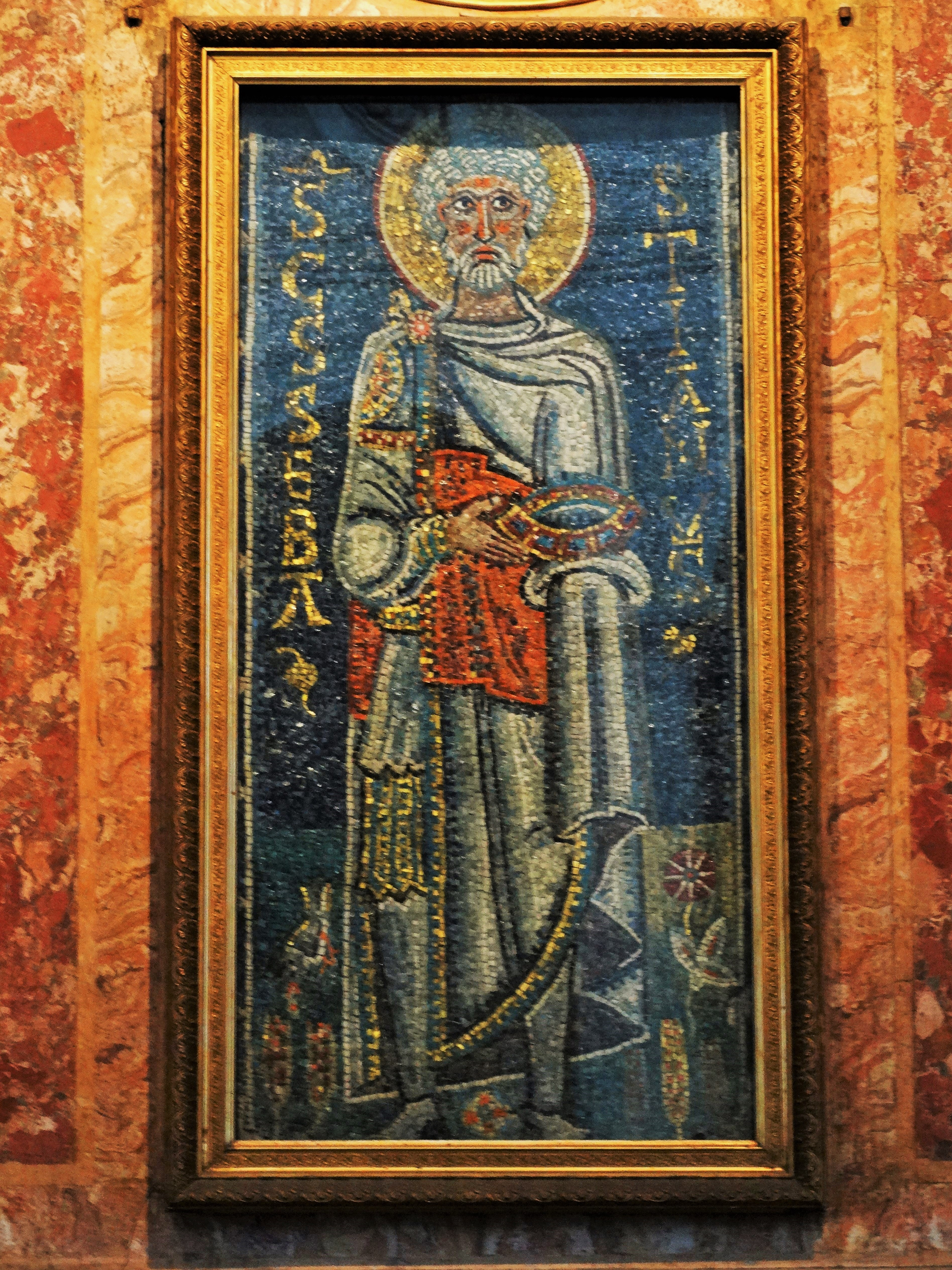
San Pietro in Vincoli

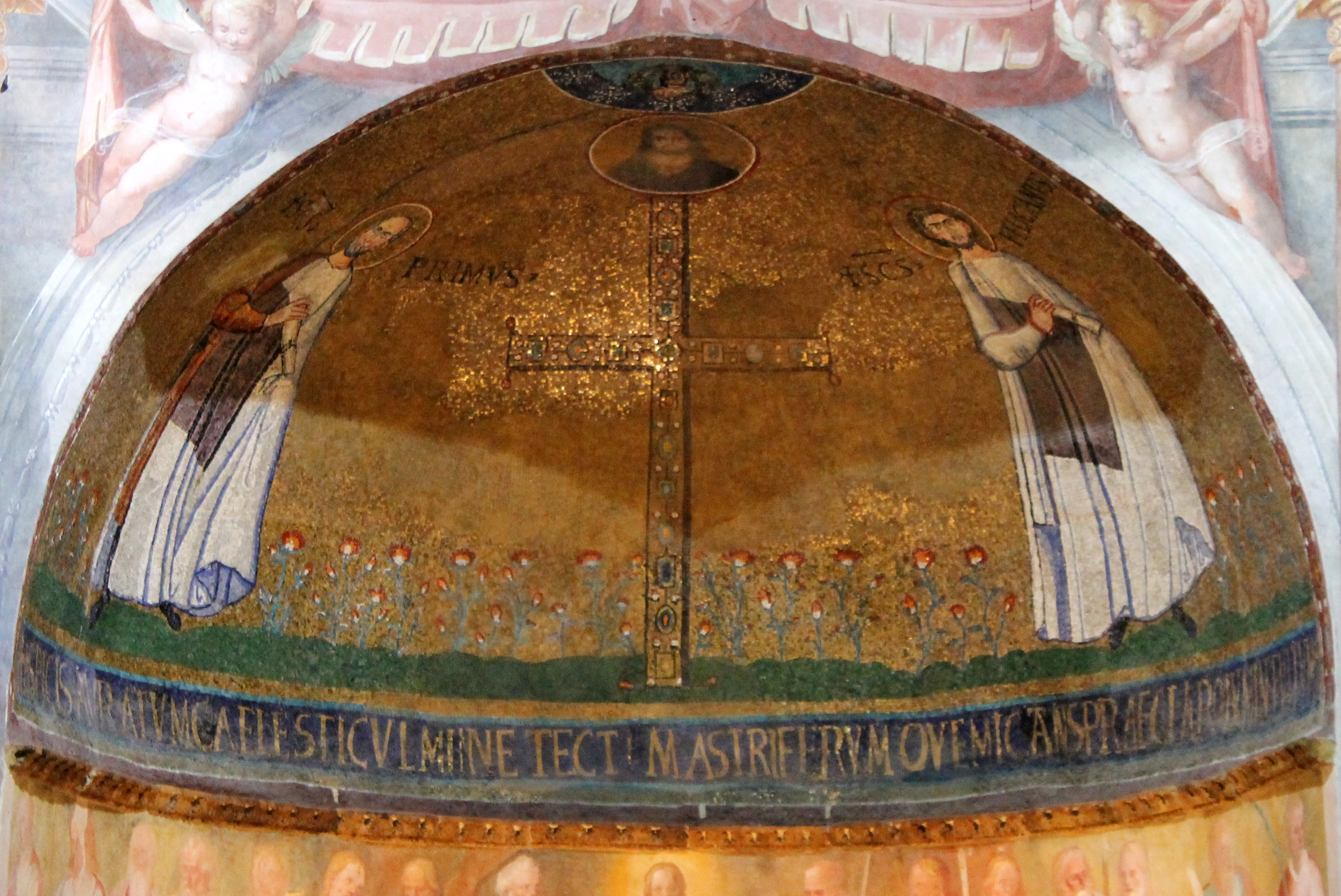
S. Stefano Rotondo

== 8th century ==
=== Greece, Thessaloniki ===
- Hagia Sophia — apse mosaic with Virgin
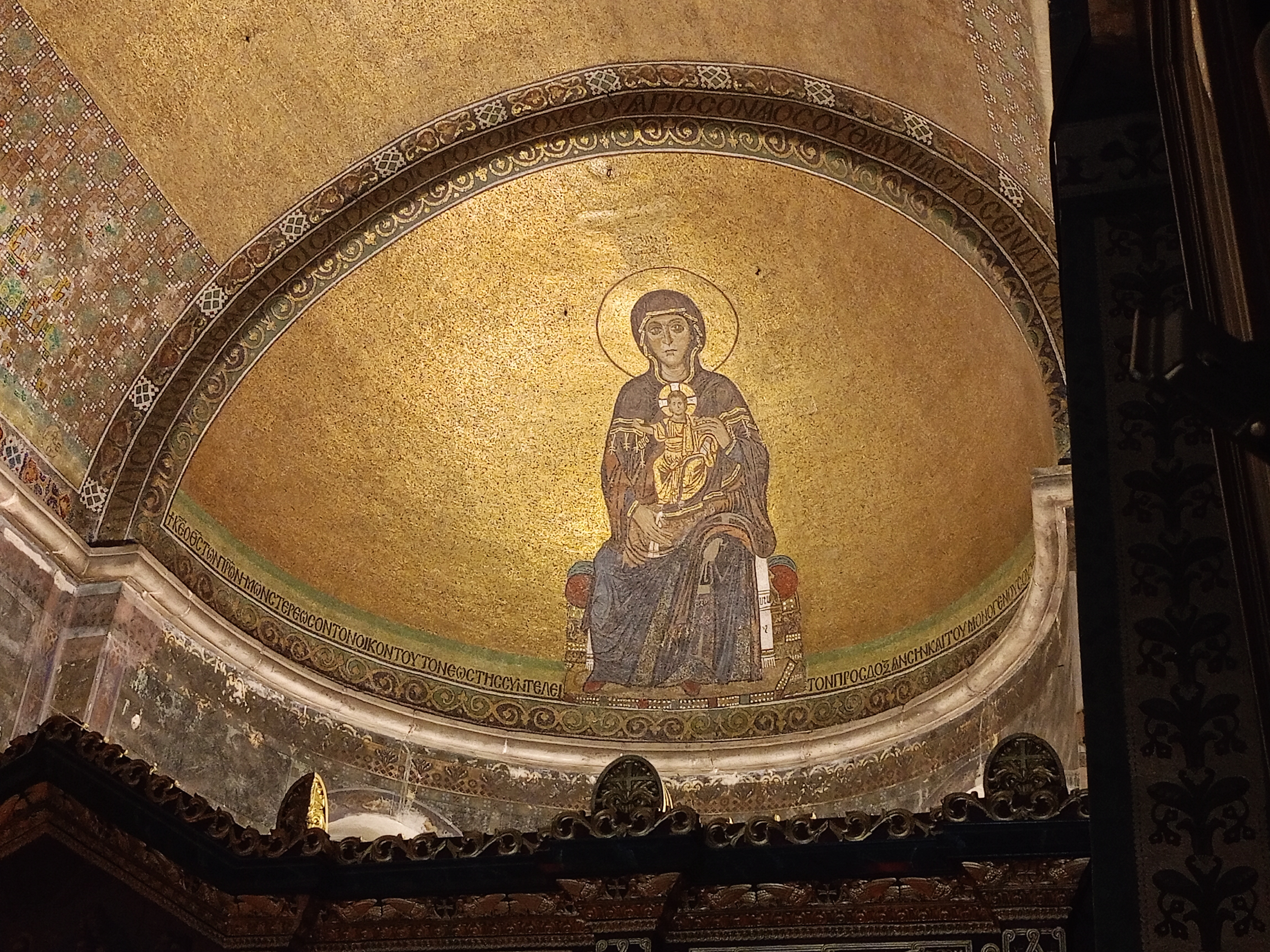
Hagia Sophia, Thessaloniki

=== Italy ===
- Bari, Bari Cathedral — floor «Mosaico di Timoteo» in crypt (Succorpo), with inscription with the name of Bishop Andrea (758—761)
- Rome, Sancta Sanctorum (Lateran) (Triclinium Leoninum) — facade, contemporary copy of 797 destroyed mosaic
- Rome, Old St. Peter's Basilica- fragments in various churches and museums
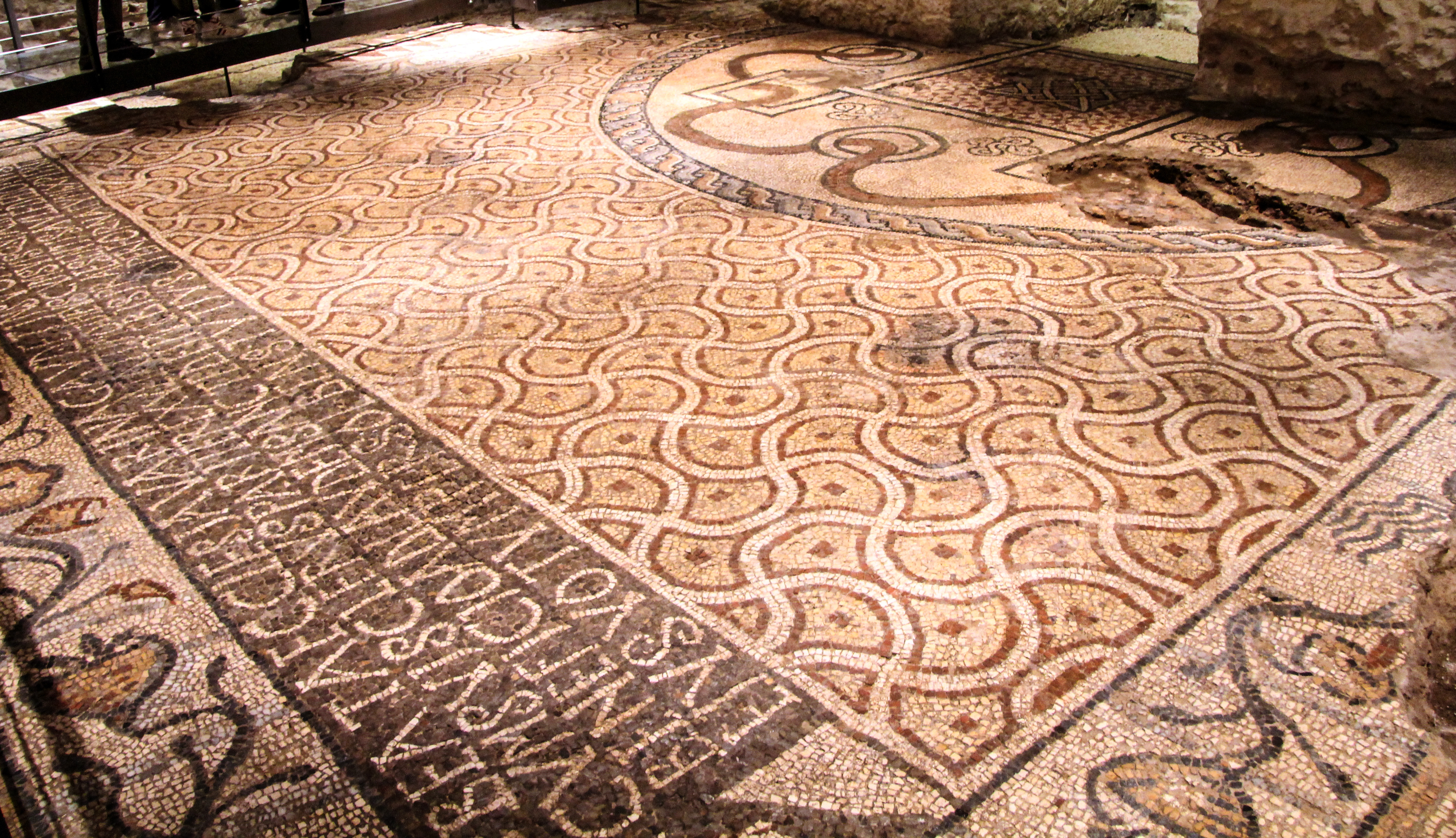
Bari Cathedral

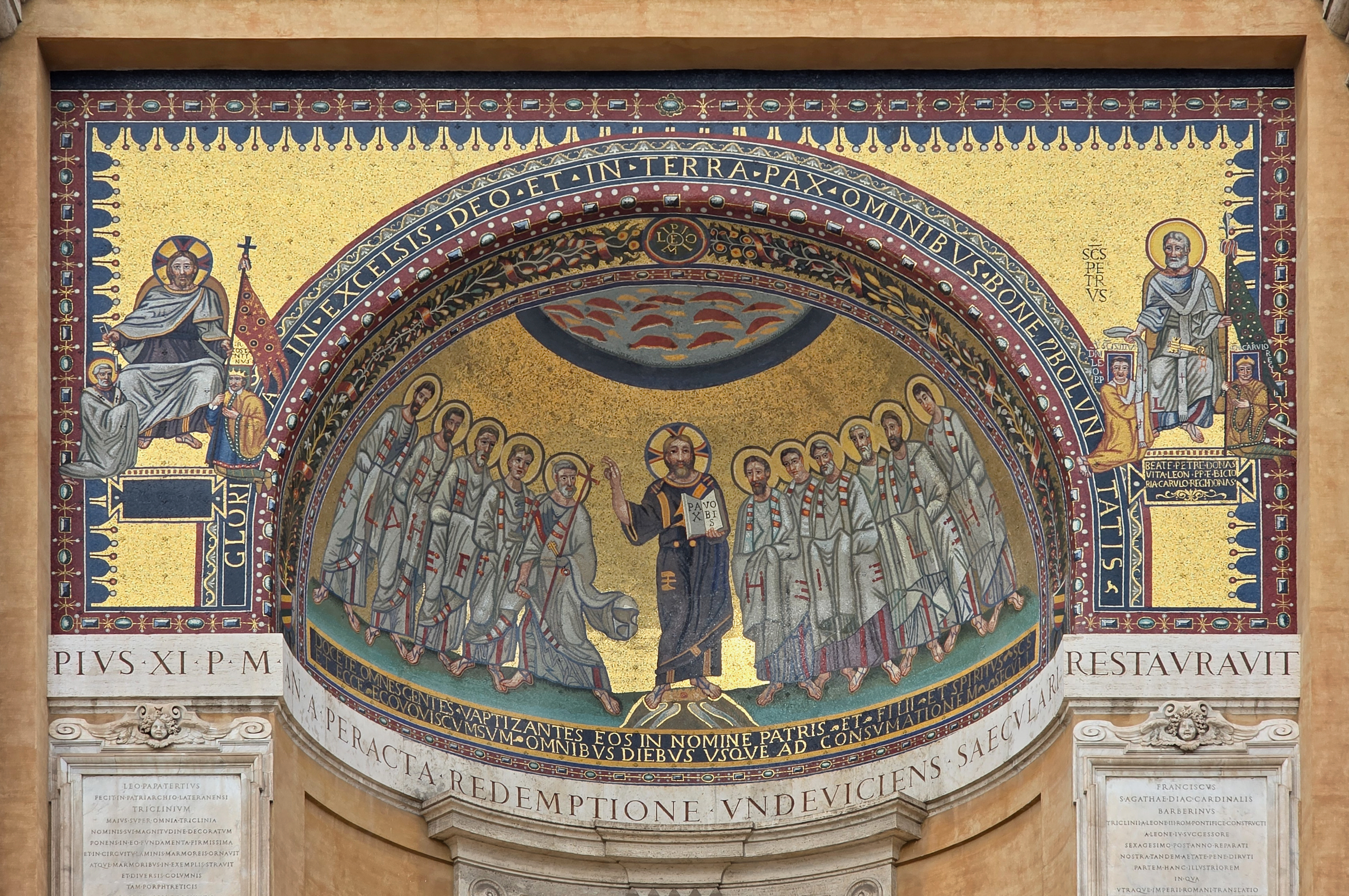
Triclinium Leoninum

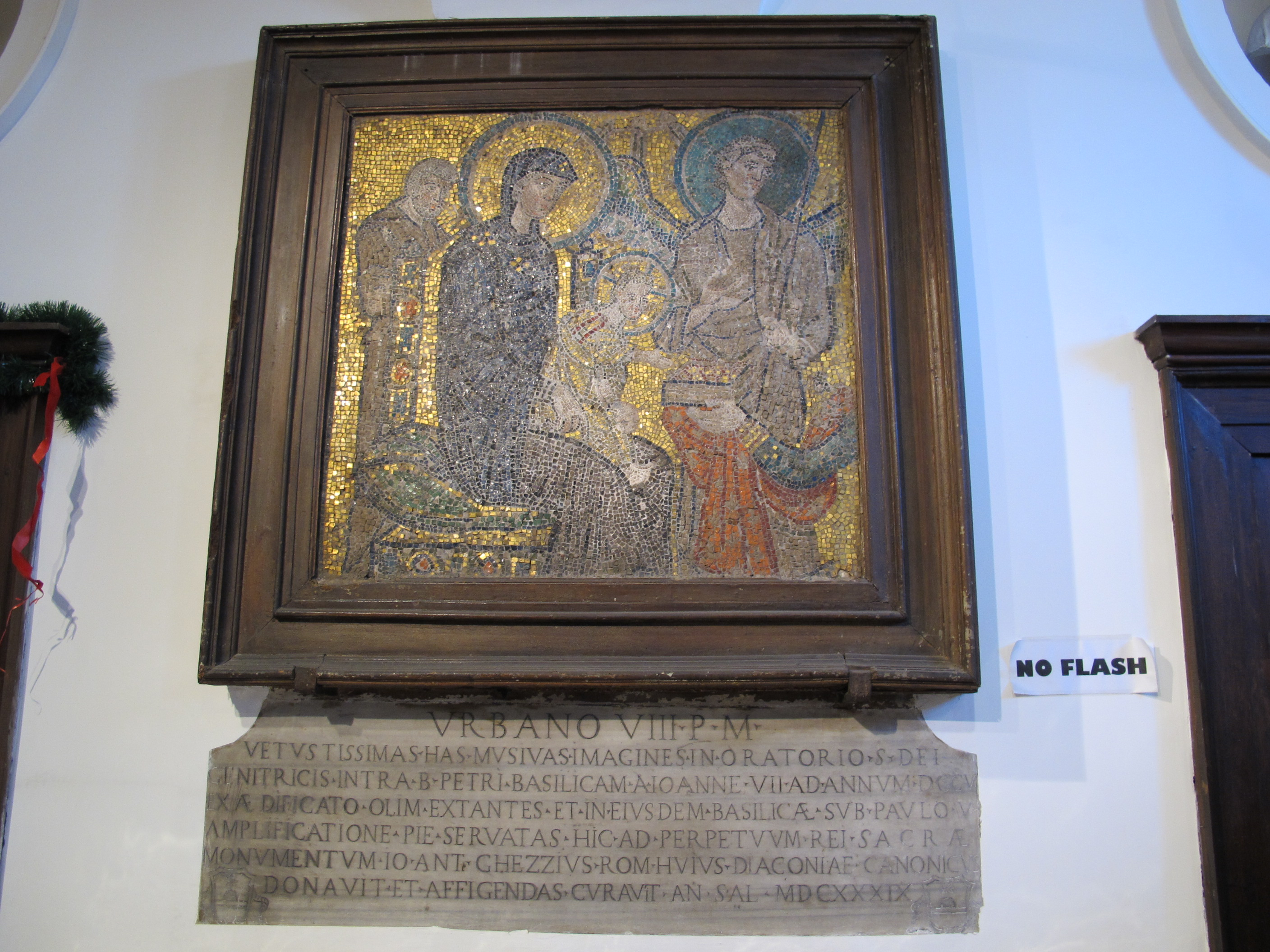
Old St. Peter's Basilica, fragment in Santa Maria in Cosmedin

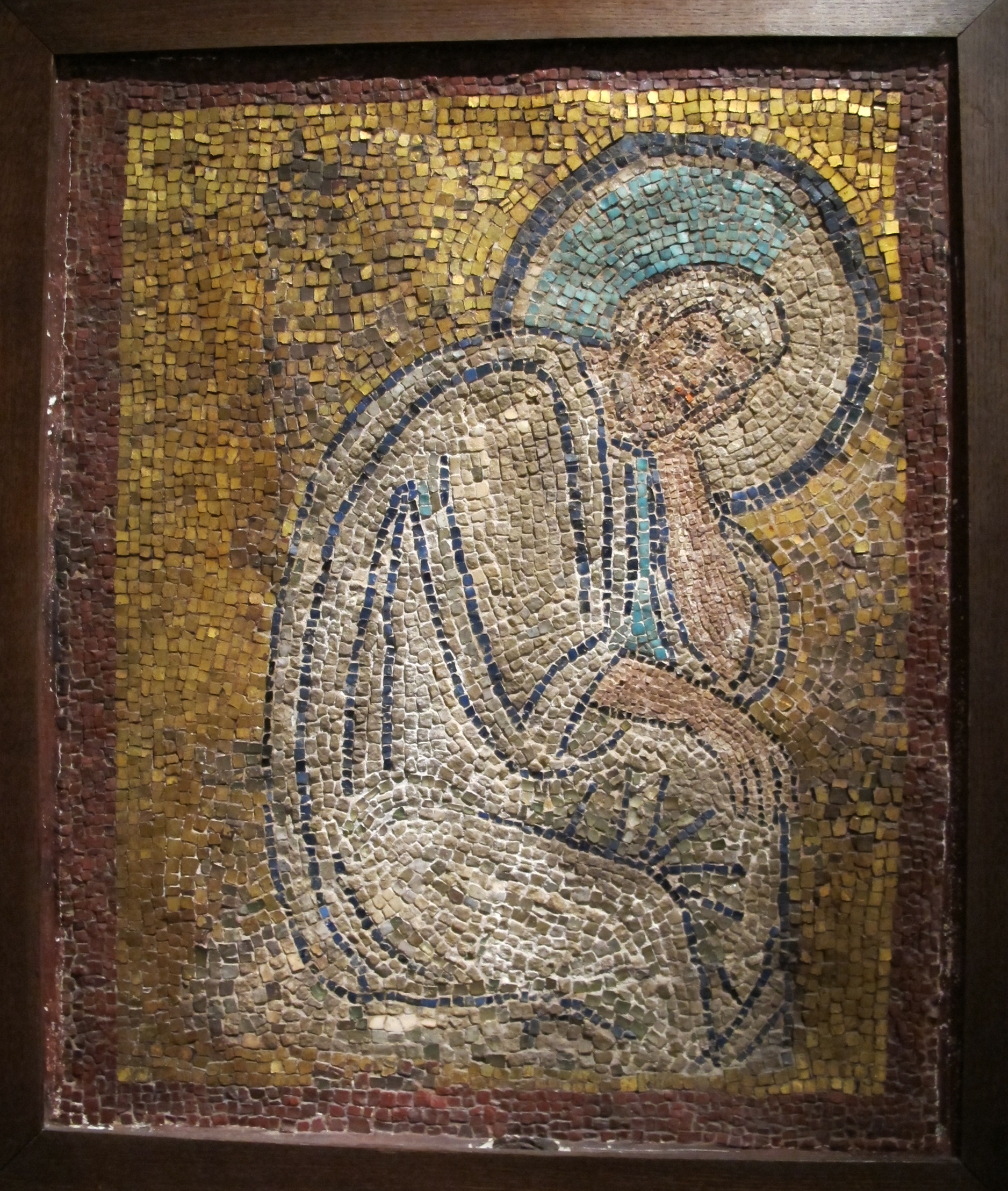
Old St. Peter's Basilica, fragment in Pushkin museum, Moscow

=== Levant ===
- Islamic mosaics: Damascus (Syria), Great Mosque (Umayyad Mosque)
- Madaba (Jordan), Umm ar-Rasas mosaics in Umm ar-Rasas — floor with cities and other significant
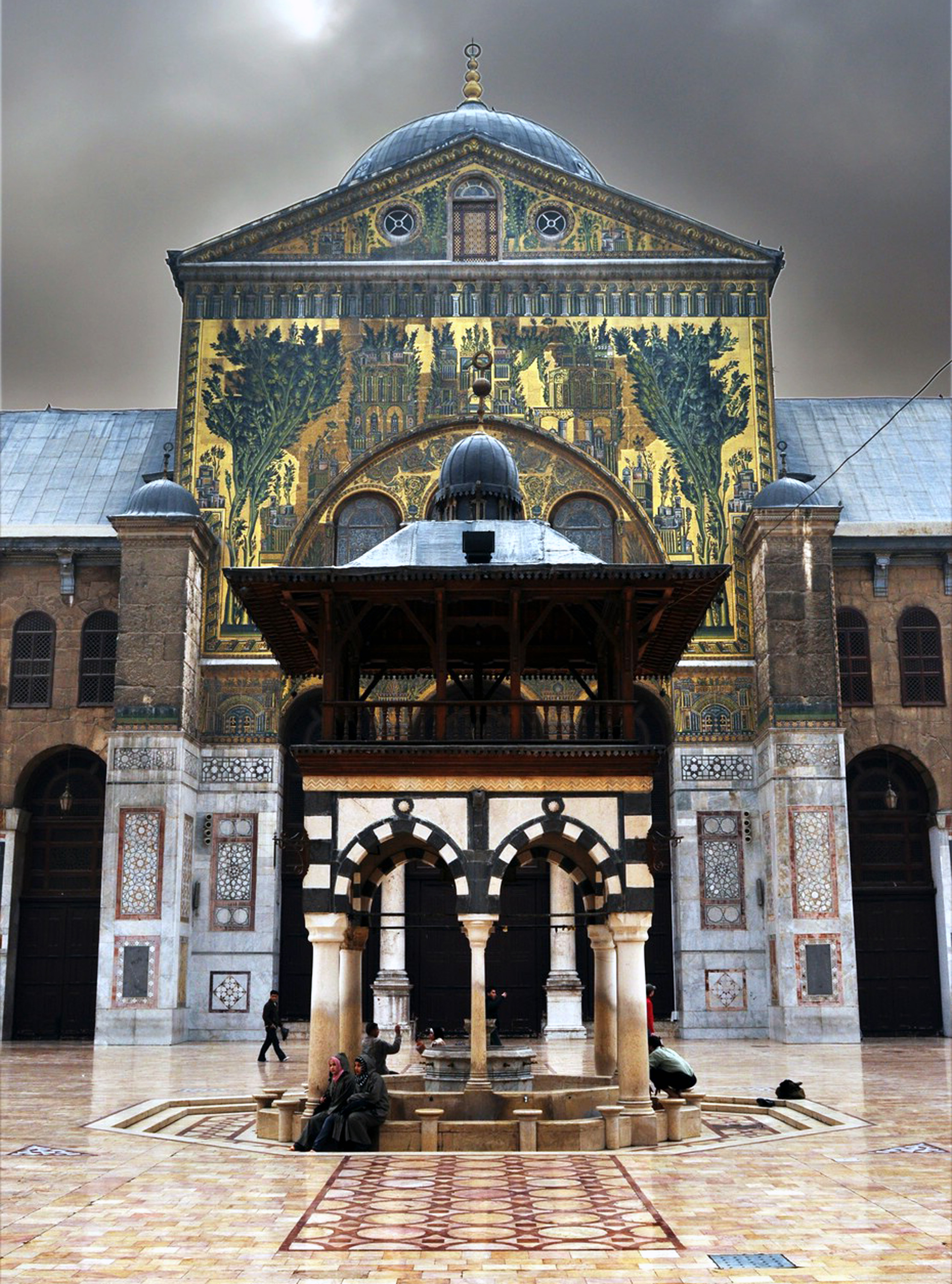
Umayyad Mosque

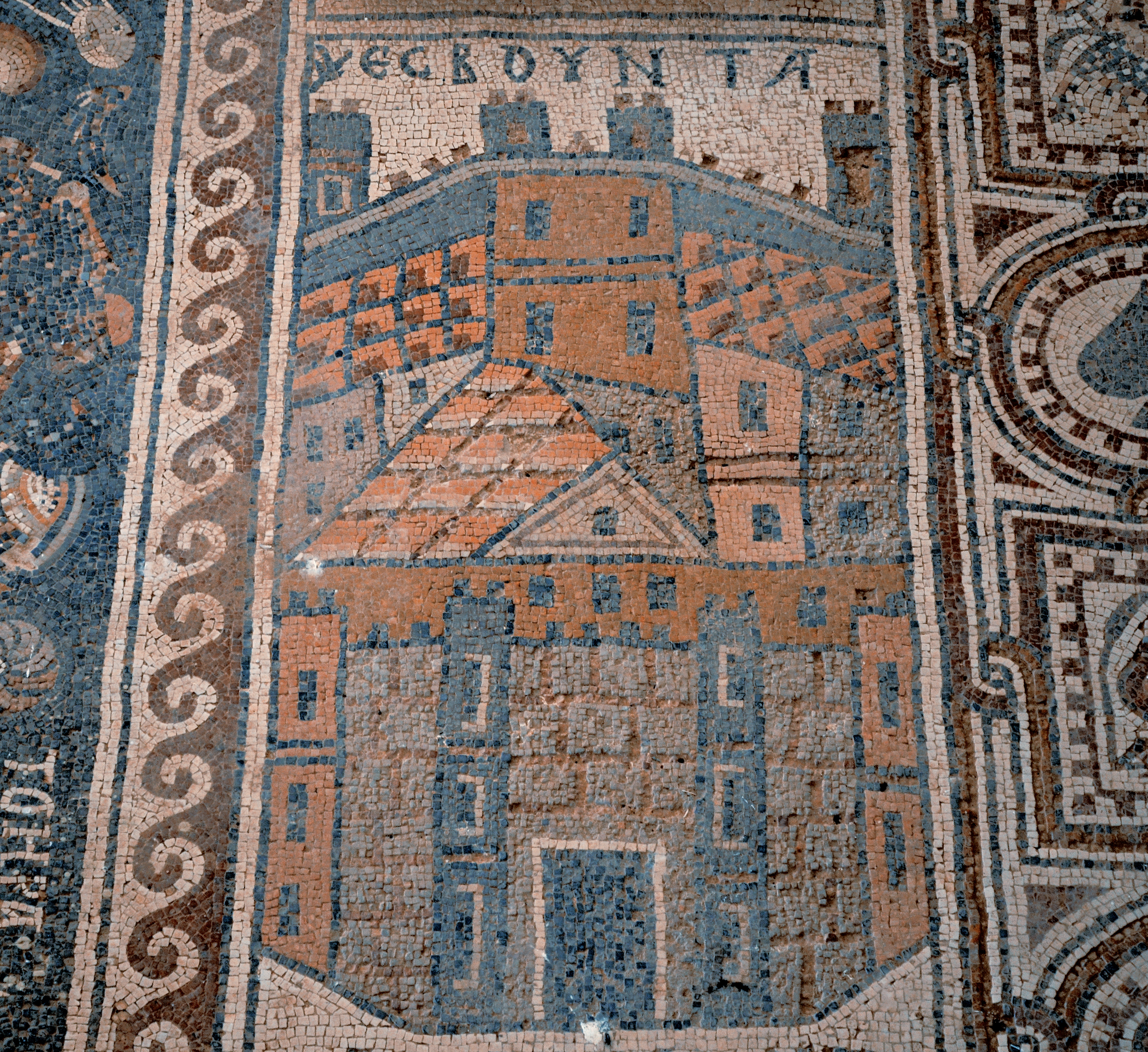
Umm ar-Rasas

=== Turkey, Istanbul ===
- Church of Hagia Irene — apse iconoclasm mosaic (c. 740)
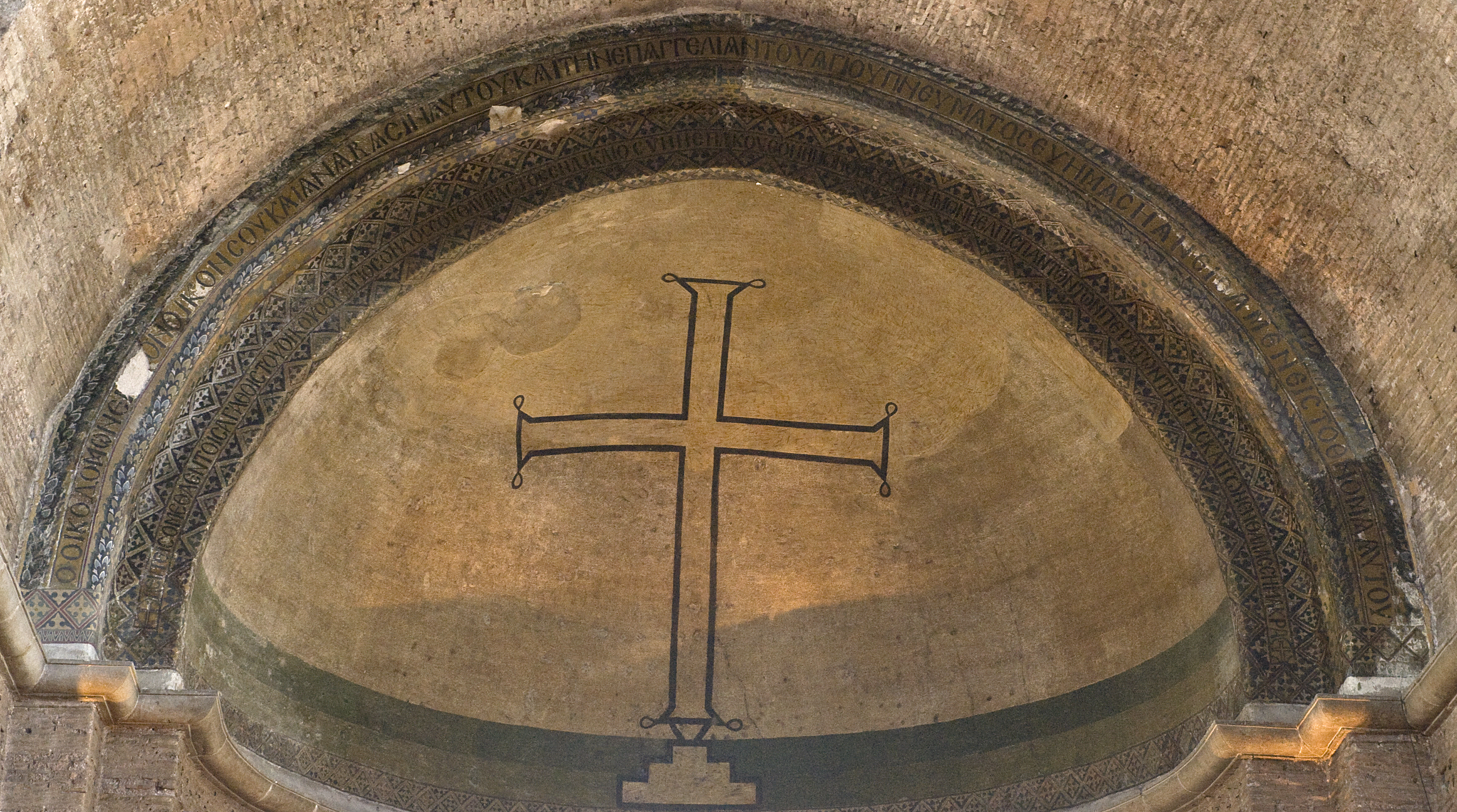
Hagia Irene

== 9th century ==
=== France ===
- Germigny-des-Prés (Orléans), Theodulf’s Oratory (fr:Oratoire carolingien de Germigny-des-Prés)
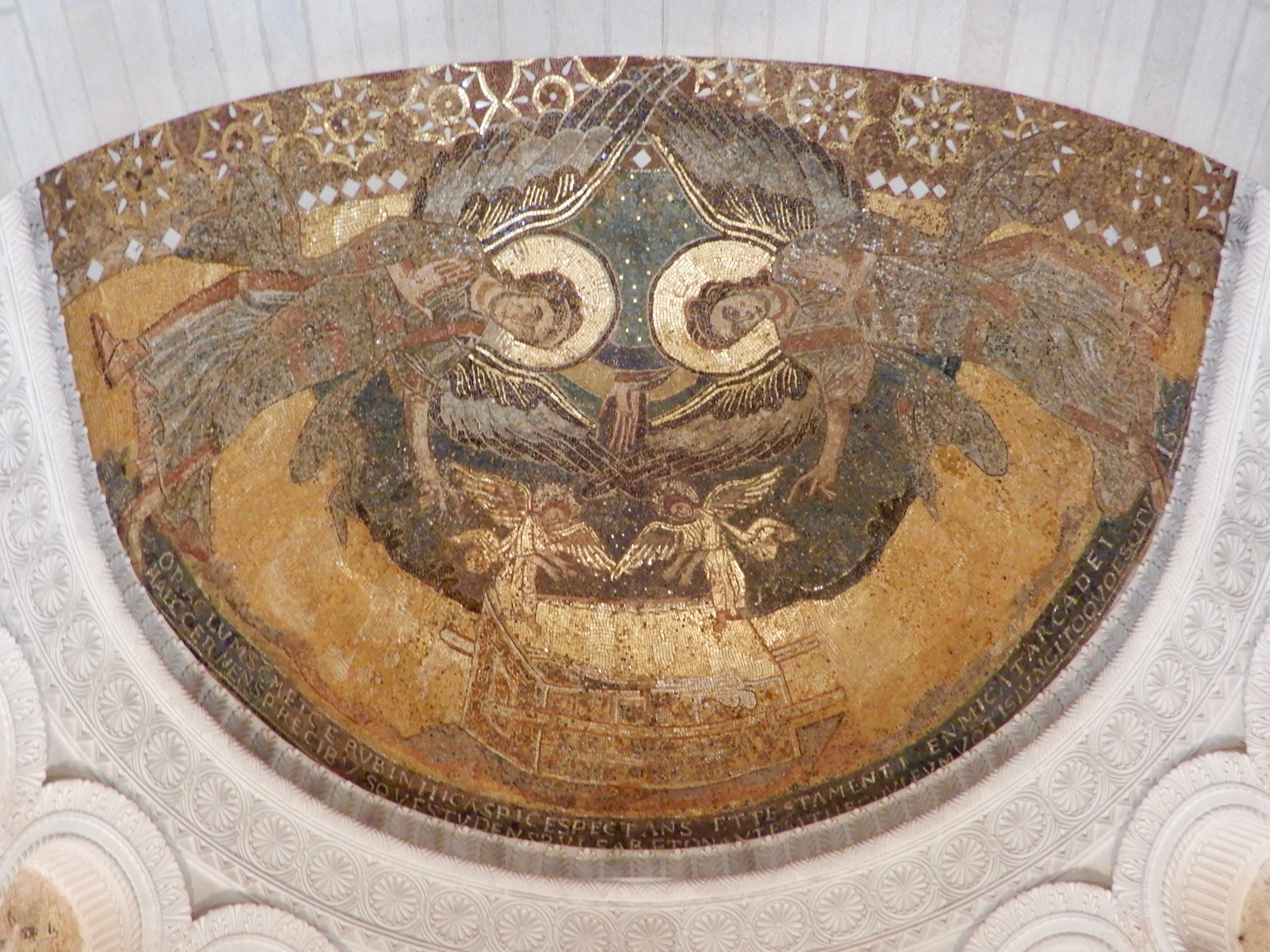
Theodulf’s Oratory

=== Italy ===
- Milan, Basilica of Sant'Ambrogio- Apse mosaic. The central Christ Pantokrator scene was created in the early 13th century, while the flanking saints (Gervasius and Protasius) and biblical scenes on the sides date back to the Carolingian period (9th century). The lateral panels, which depict scenes from the lives of Saint Ambrose and Saint Martin of Tours, also likely date to the 9th century
- Ravenna churches — repairs
- Rome, Church of Santa Cecilia in Trastevere
- Rome, Church of San Marco Evangelista al Campidoglio (833)
- Rome, Church of Santa Maria in Domnica (817—824)
- Rome, Church of Santi Nereo e Achilleo
- Rome, Church of Santa Prassede and its Zeno Chapel
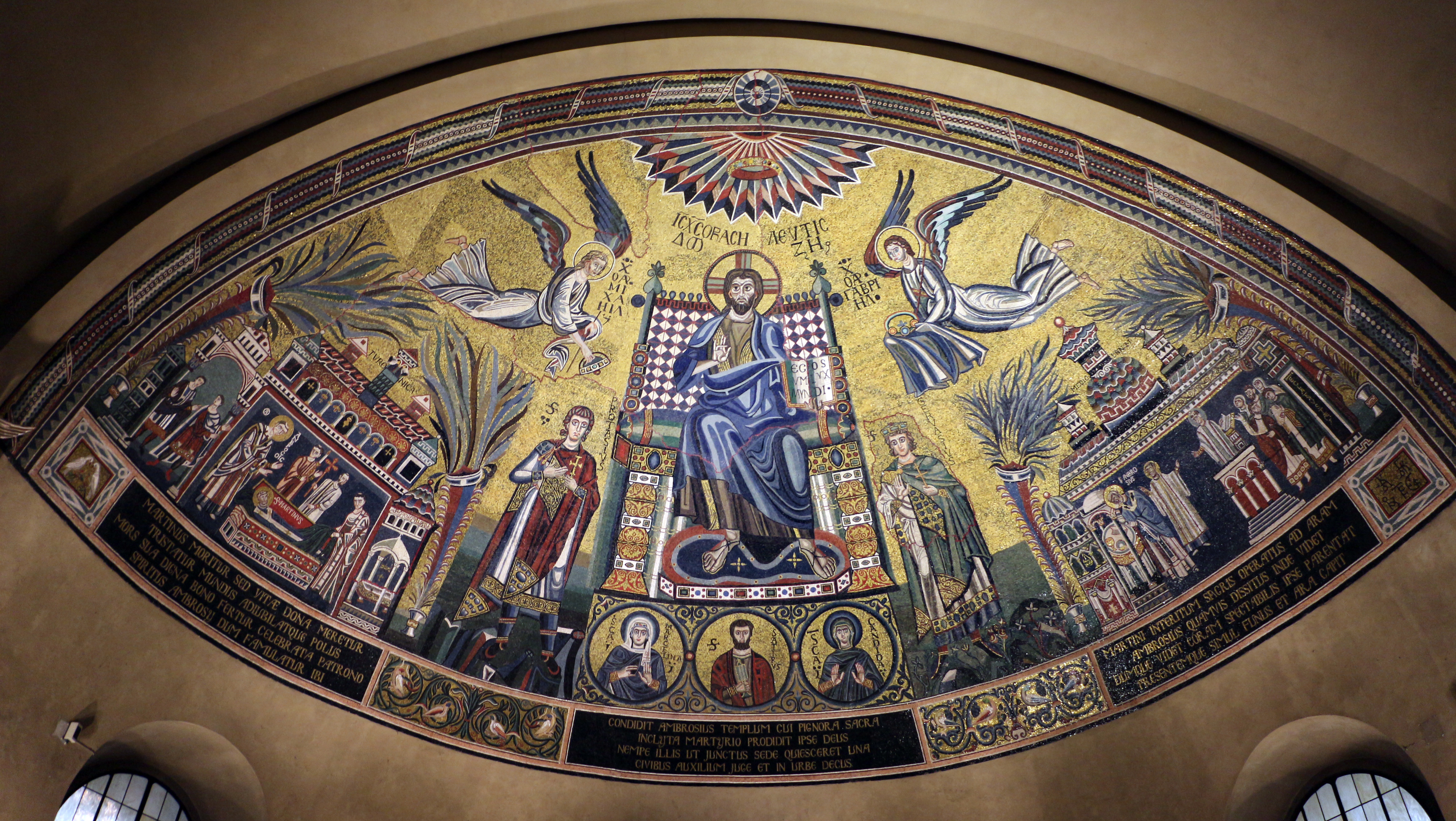
Basilica of Sant'Ambrogio

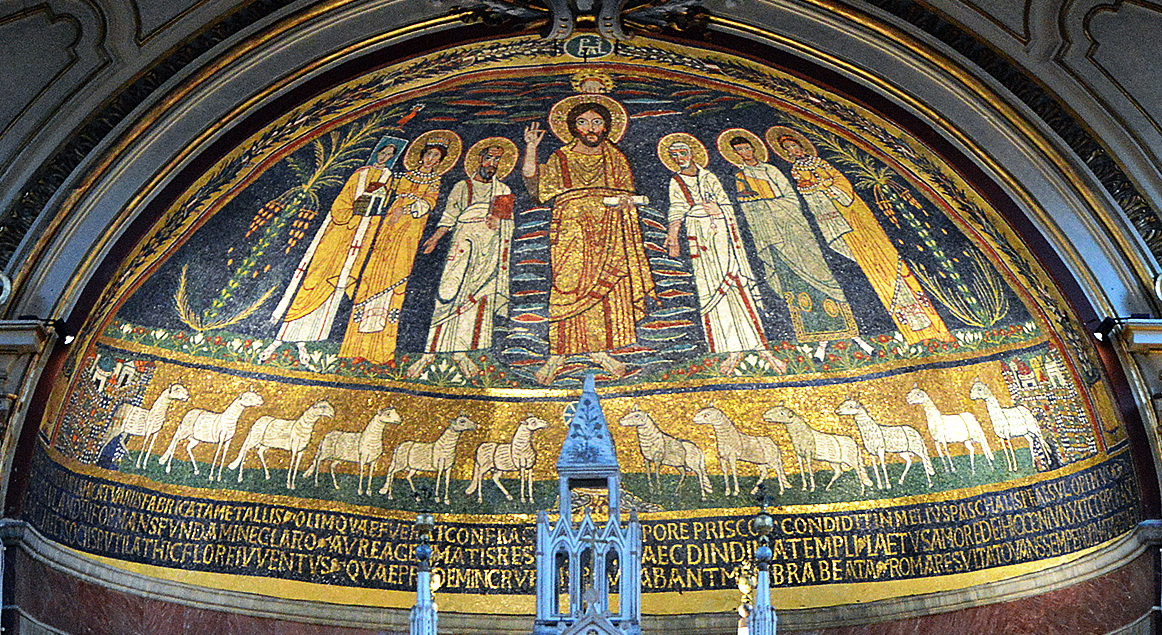
Santa Cecilia in Trastevere

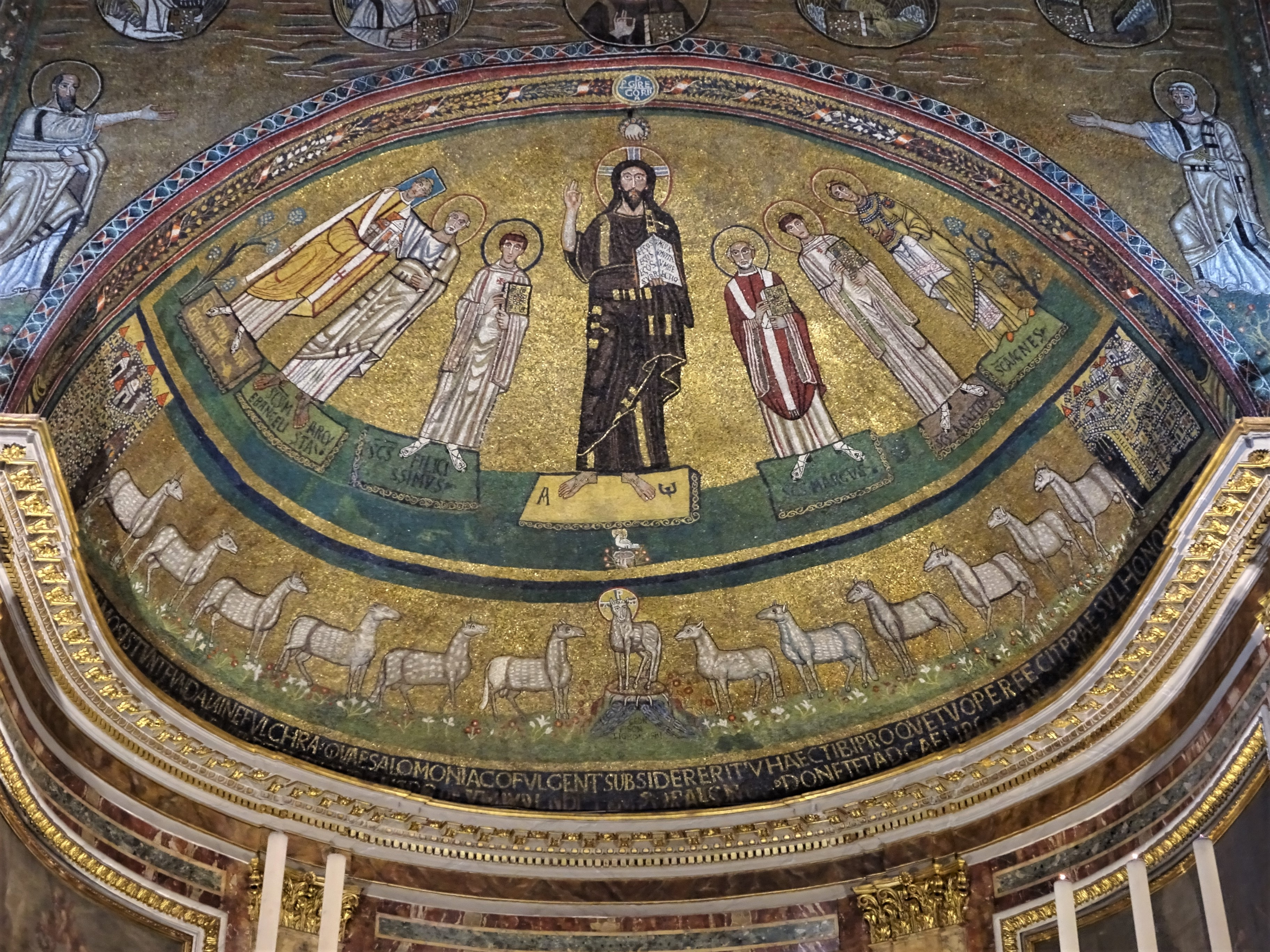
San Marco

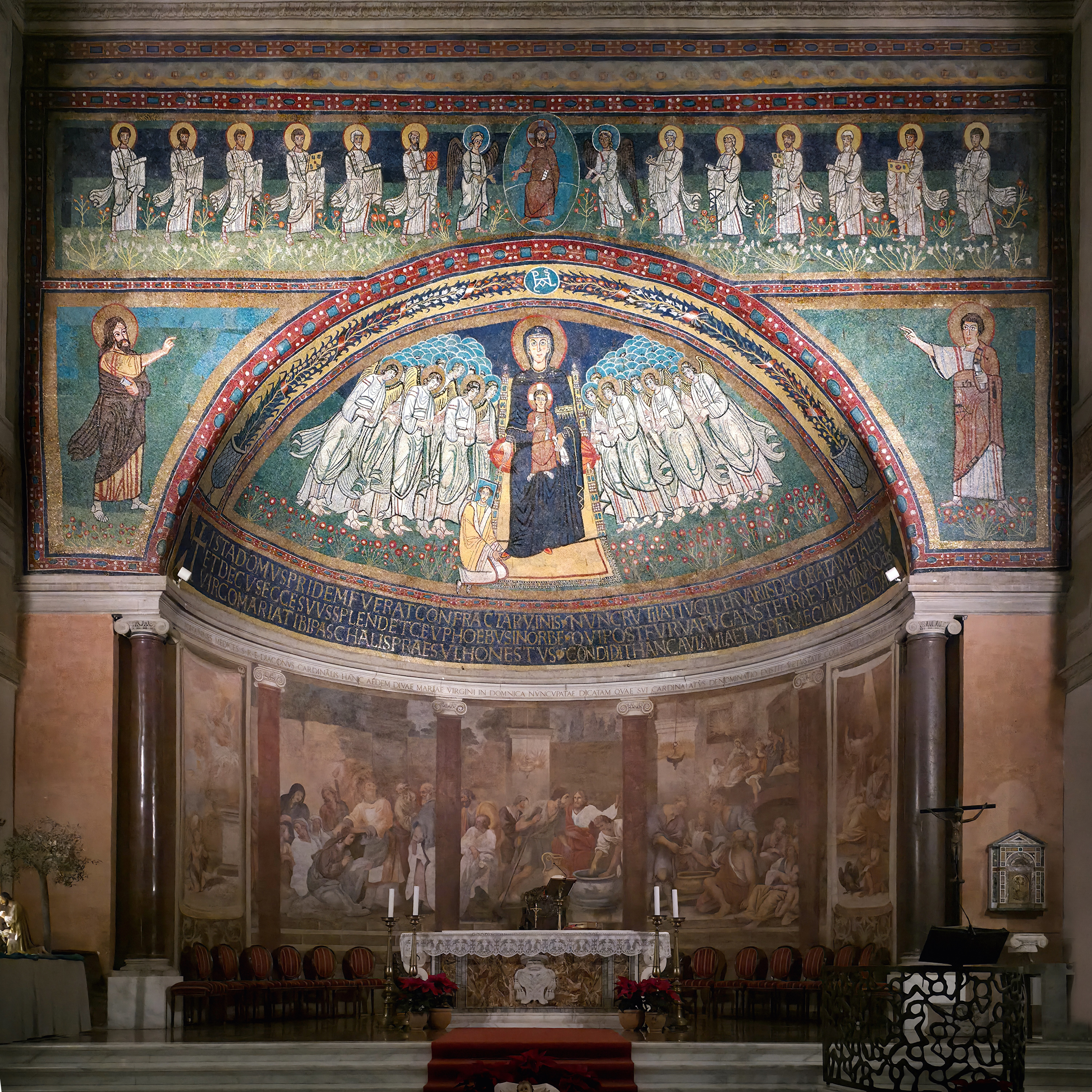
Santa Maria in Domnica

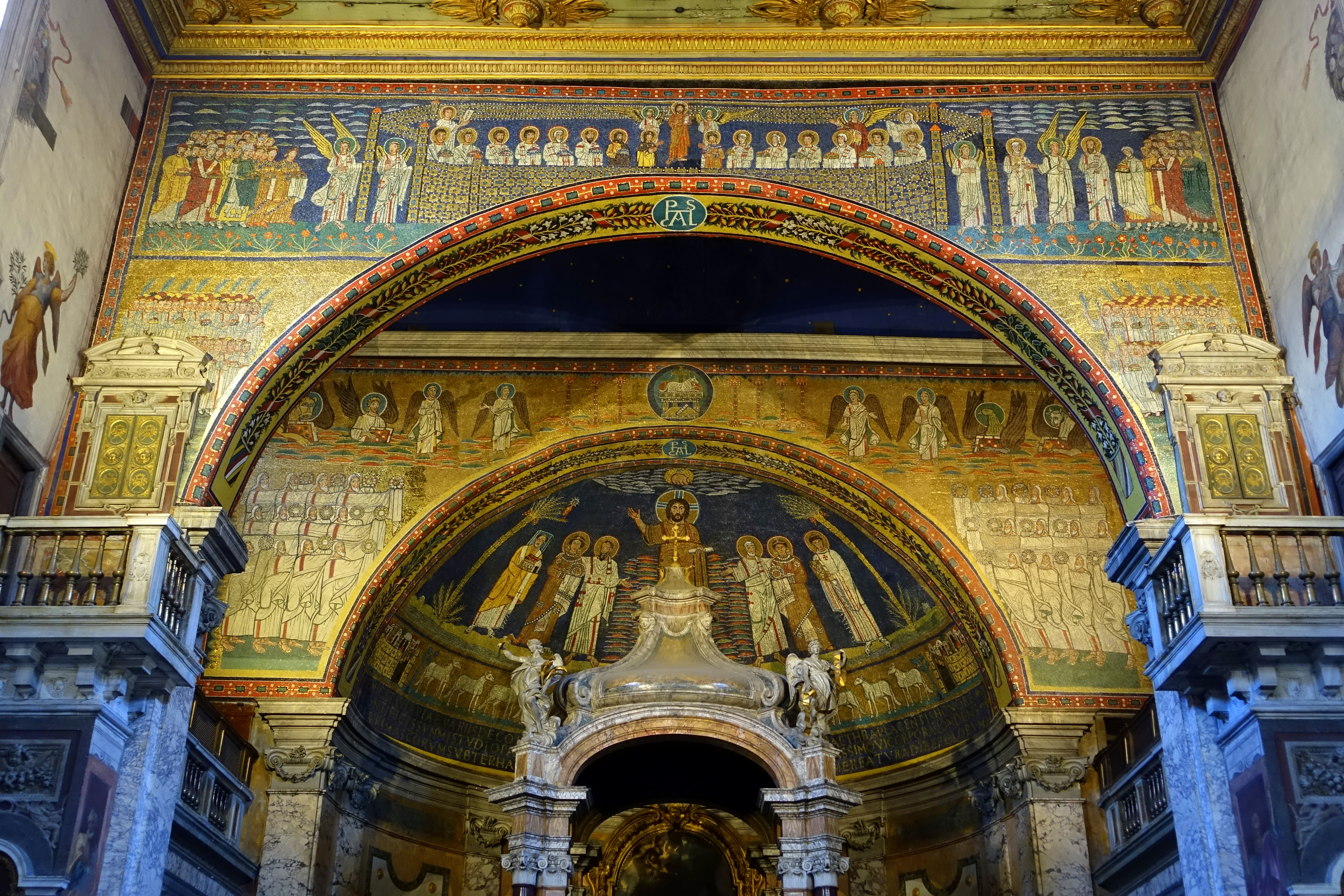
Santa Prassede

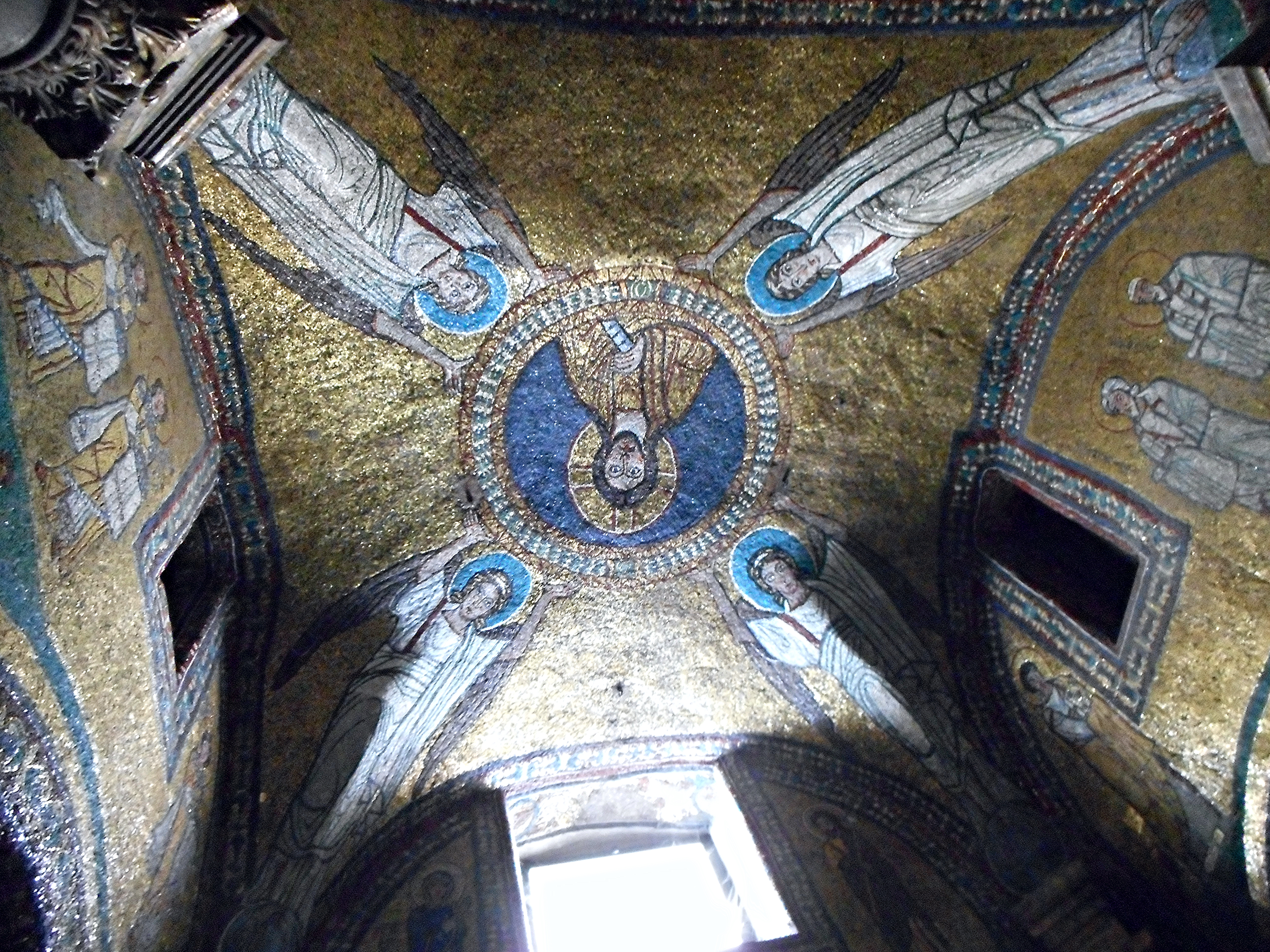
Santa Prassede, Zeno chapel

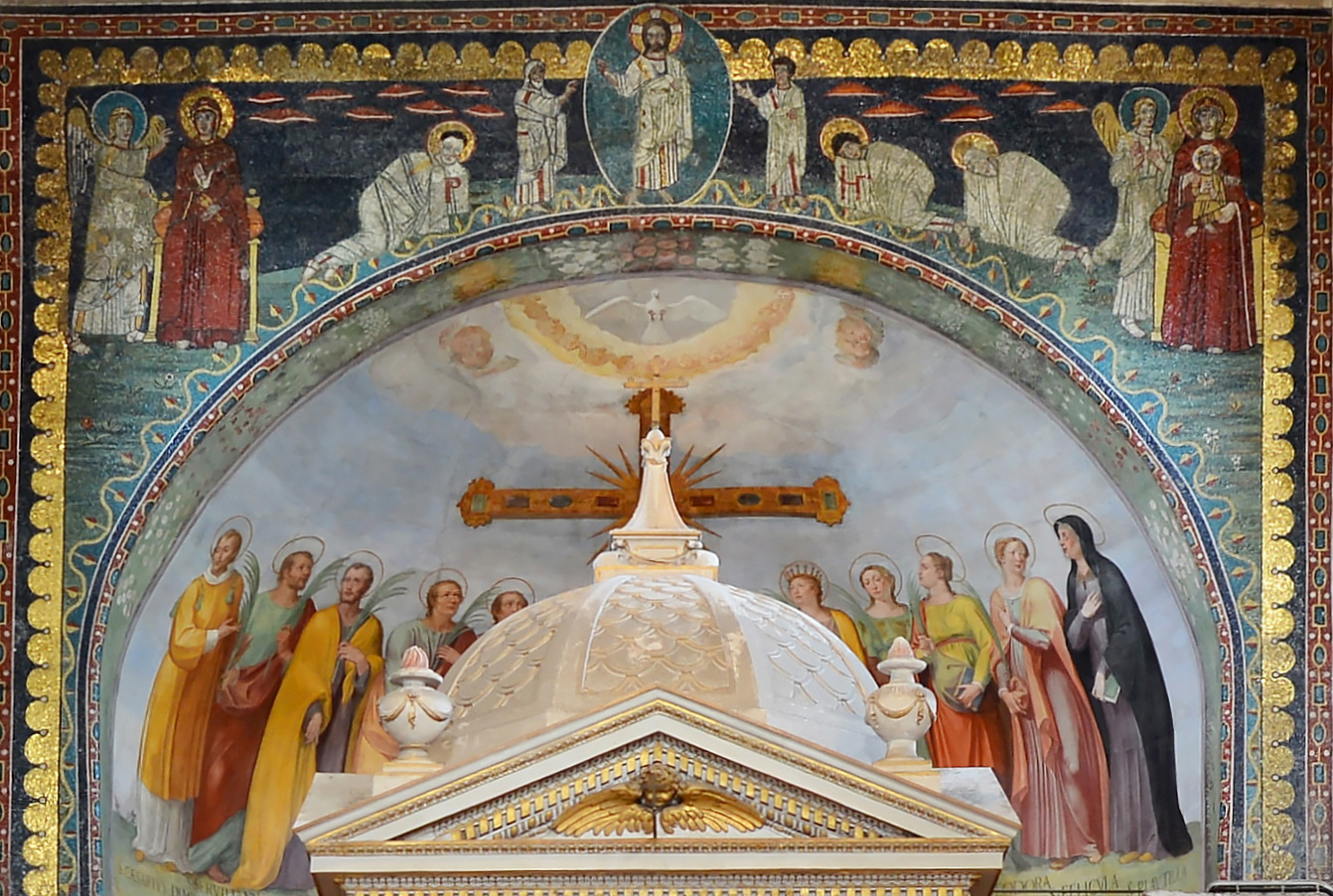
Santi Nereo e Achilleo

=== Germany, Aachen ===
- Palatine Chapel, Aachen — 9th century mosaics not survived, replaced with 19th-century fantasy reconstruction. Some ornamental and architecture fragments of mosaics found of the walls of octagon are now in Treasure of Cathedral (Domschatzkammer Aachen)

=== Greece, Thessaloniki ===
- Hagia Sophia- dome mosaic
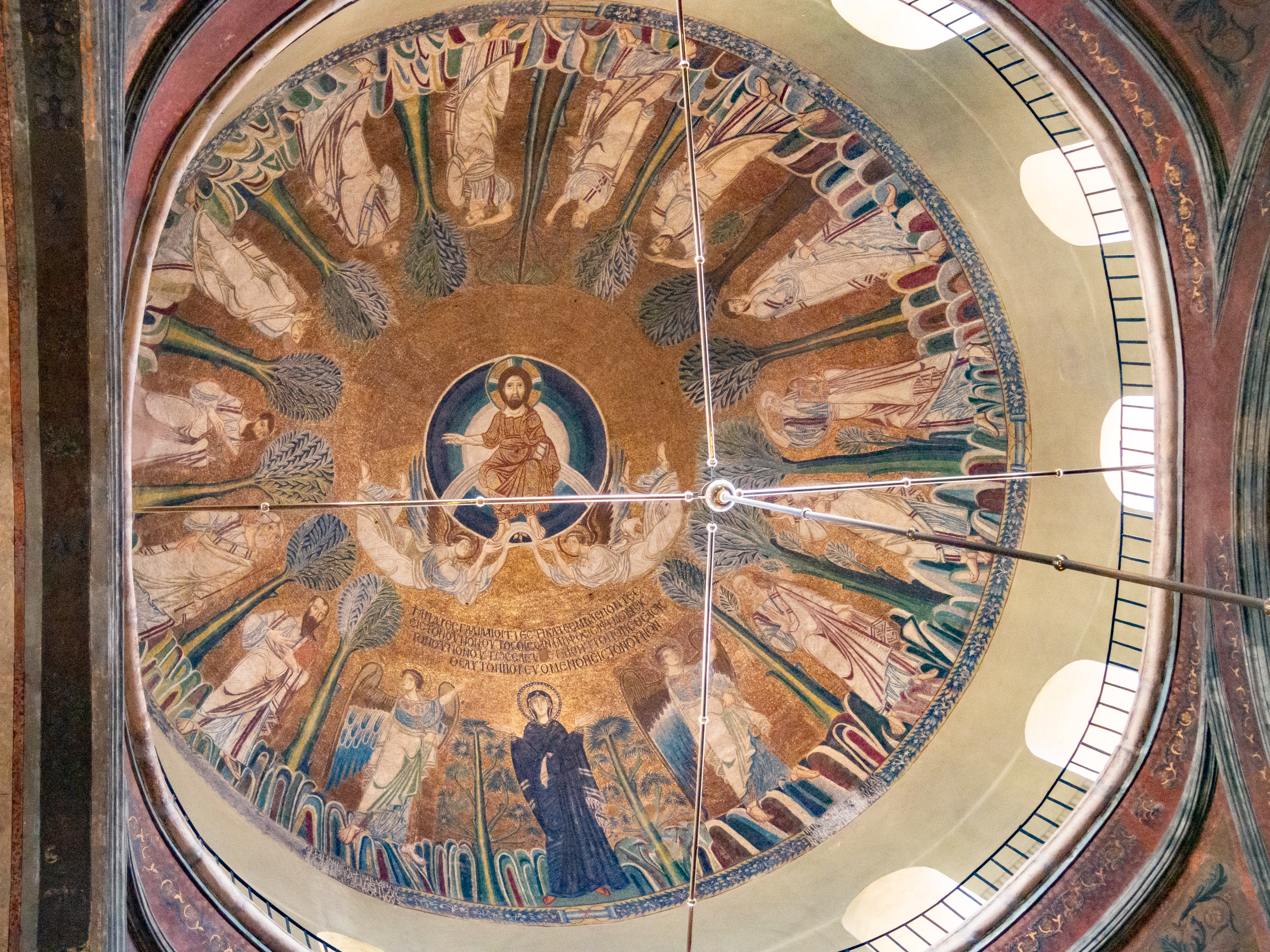
Hagia Sophia, Thessaloniki

=== Turkey, Istanbul ===
- Hagia Sophia — «Virgin enthroned» mosaic in apse; «Gabriel» in apse’s bema; mosaics of the northern tympanum depicting Ignatius the God-Bearer, John Chrysostom and Ignatius, Patriarch of Constantinople; «Imperial Gate mosaic» with Leo VI (886—912)
- Church of the Virgin of the Pharos (c. 864) — the earliest monument with a classical iconographic system for mosaic arrangement. The composition consisted of images of the Almighty with archangels on the central temple bath, the Oranta in the apse, and apostles, patriarchs, prophets, martyrs, and saints on the walls and vaults. It has not survived.
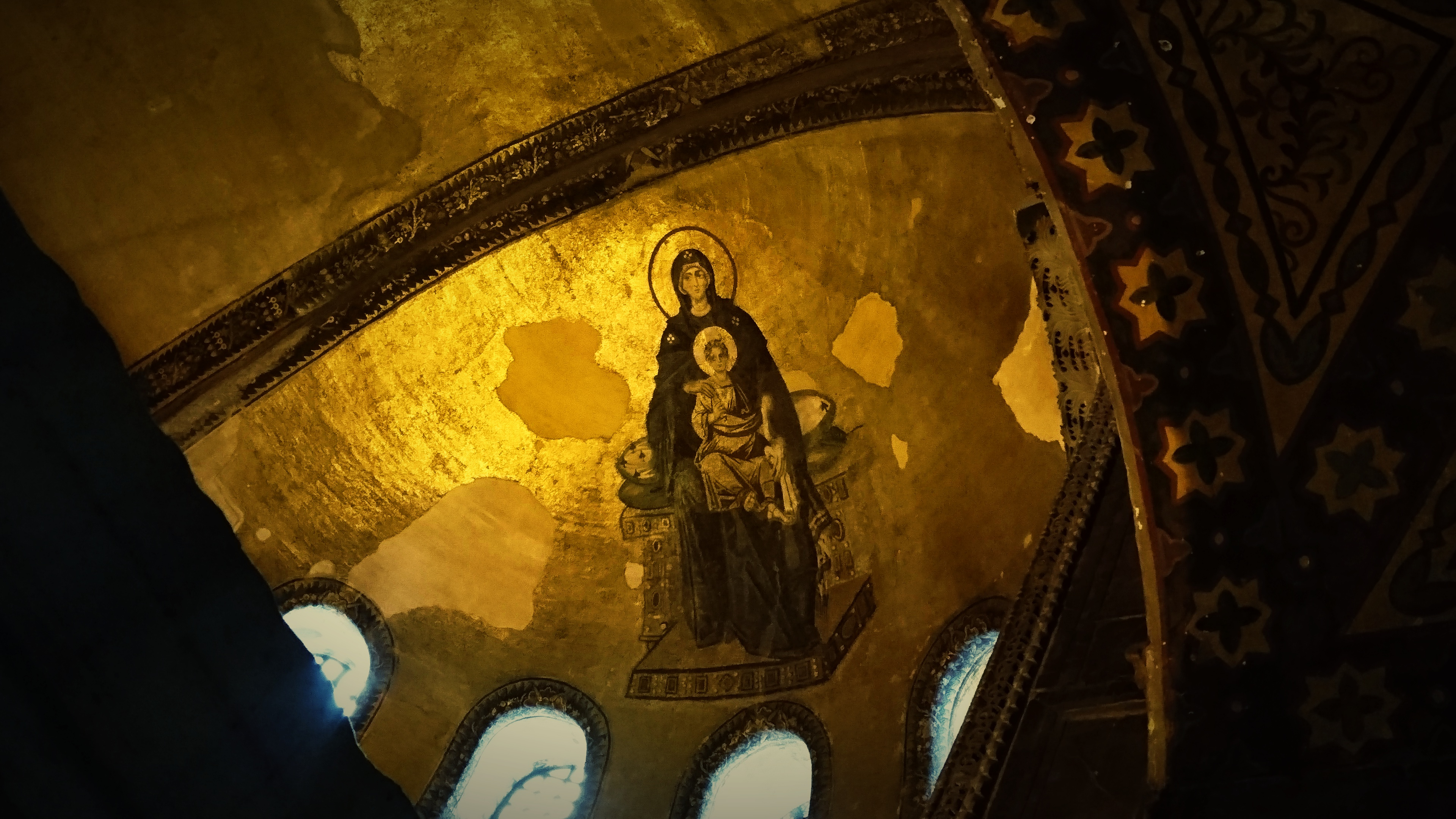
Hagia Sophia, Virgin enthroned

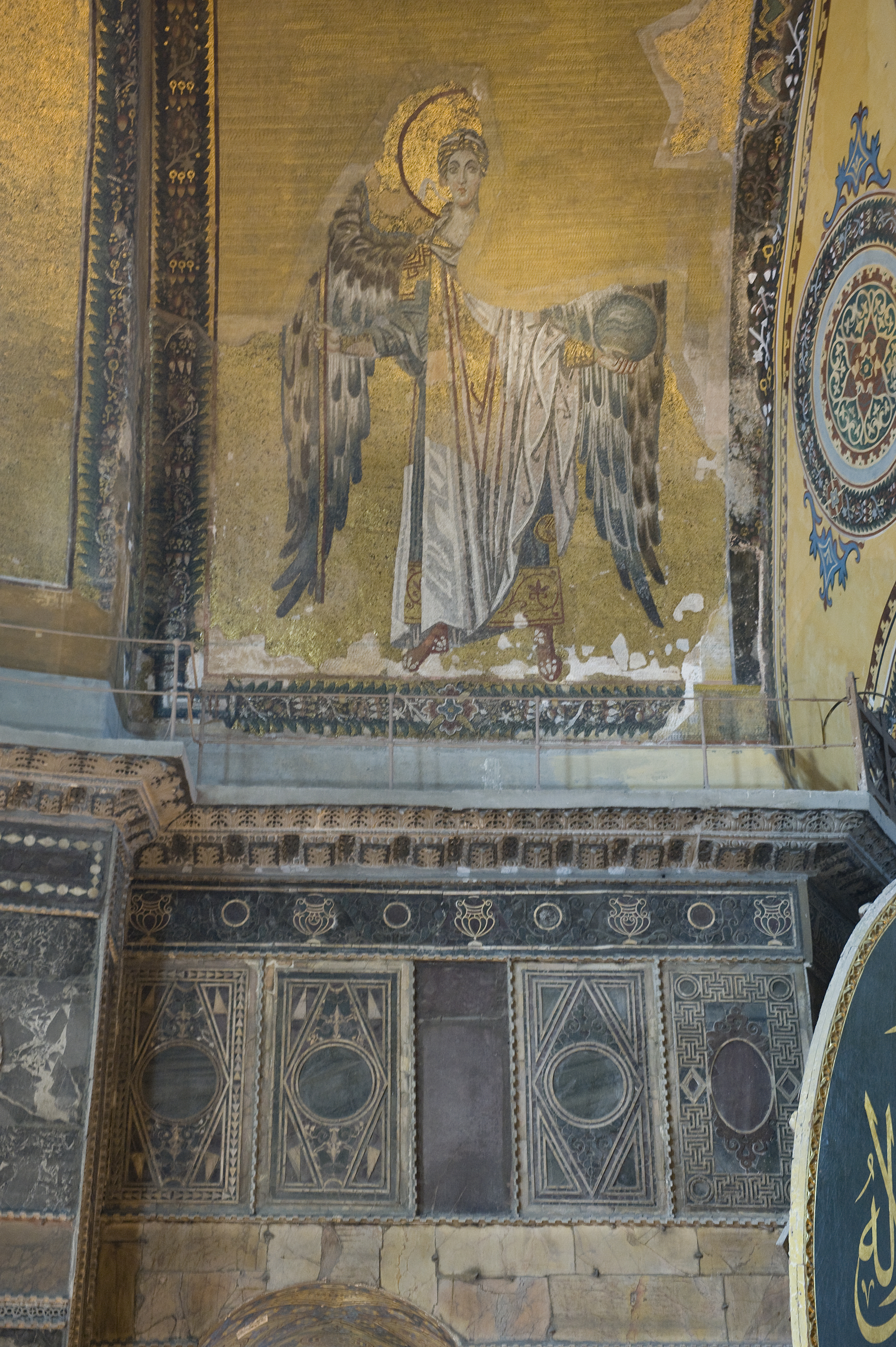
Hagia Sophia, Gabriel

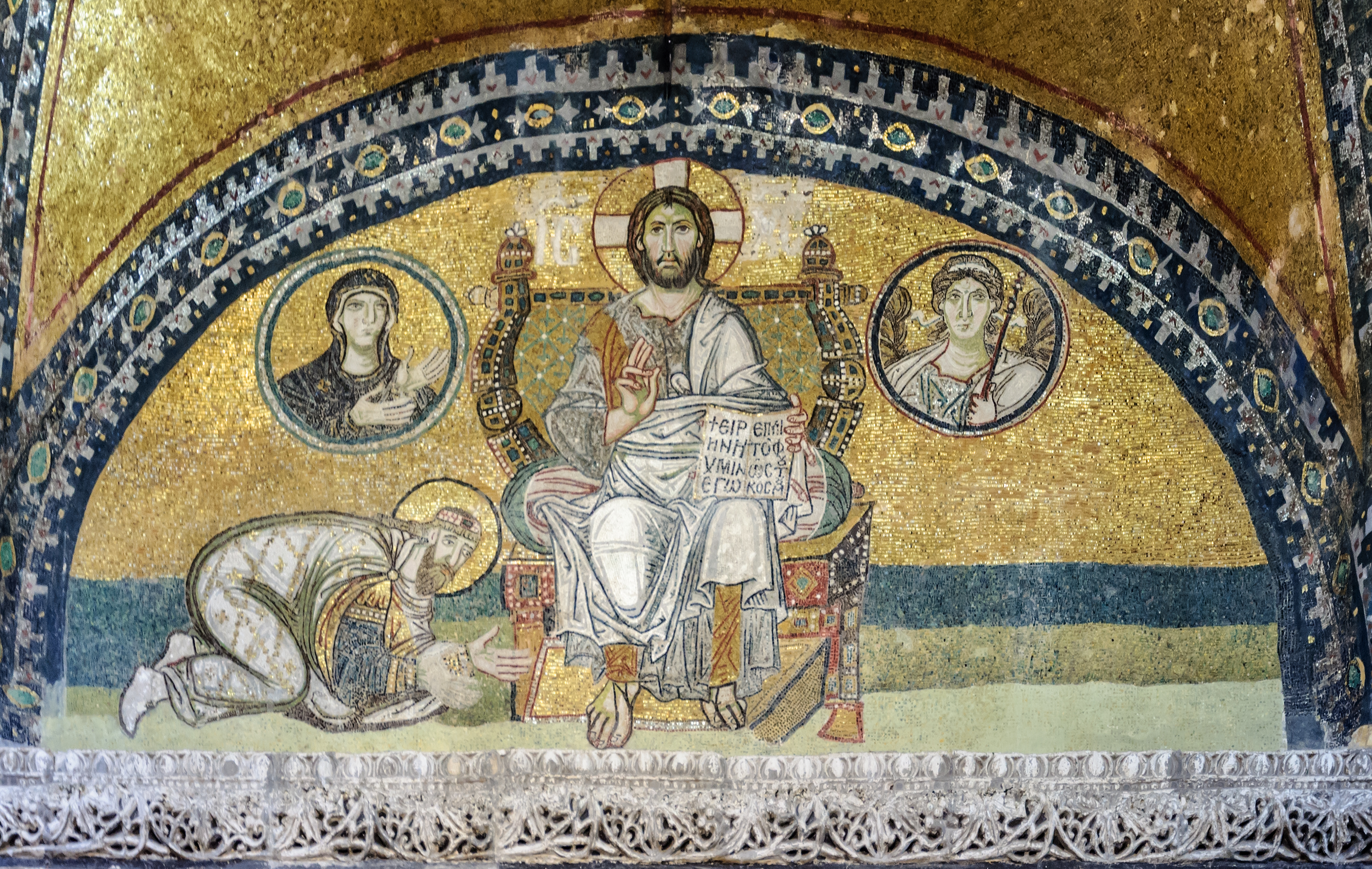
Hagia Sophia, Imperial Gate mosaic

== 10th century ==
=== Spain, Cordoba ===
Islamic mosaic

- Mosque–Cathedral of Córdoba (Great Mosque)
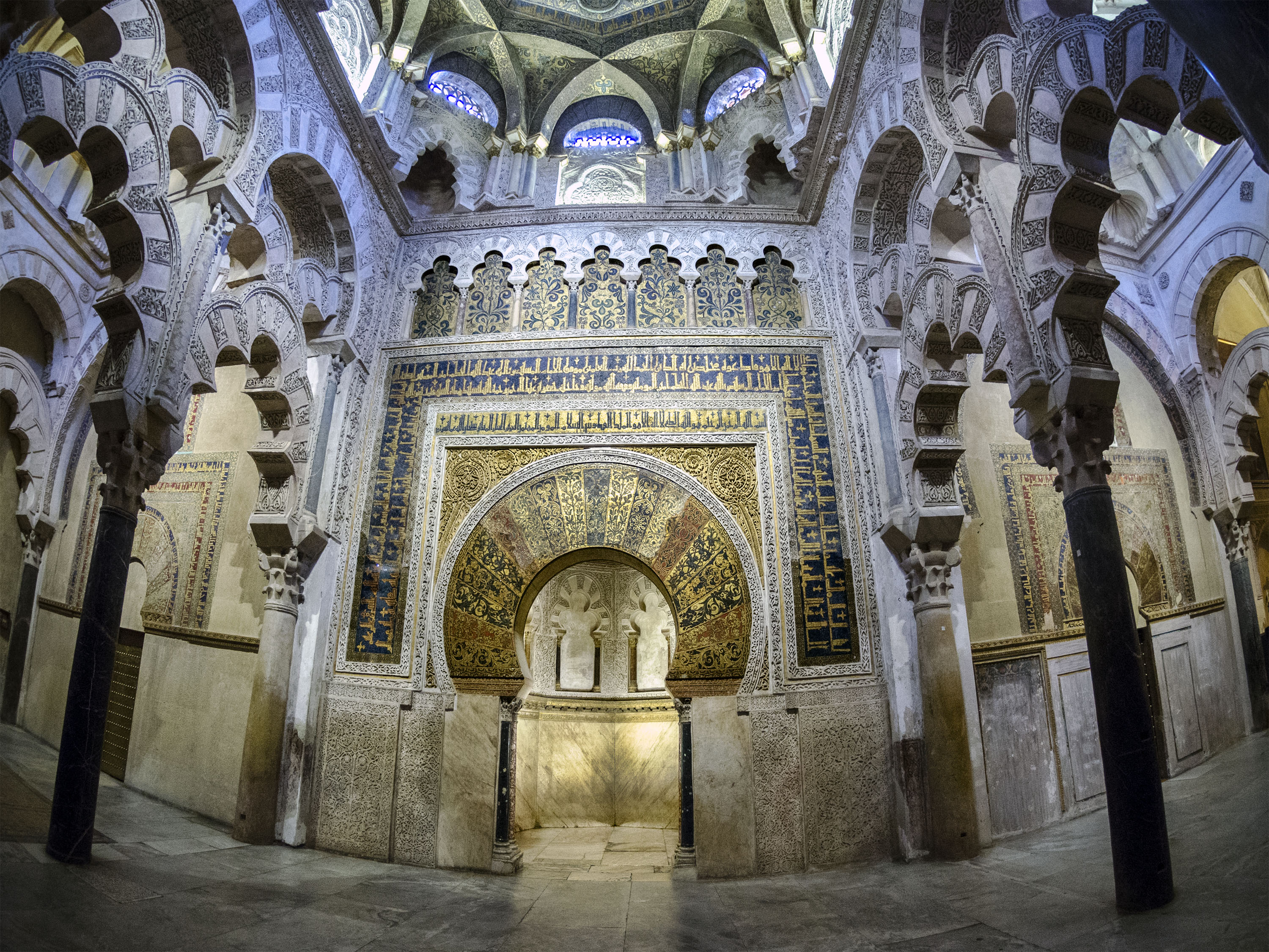

=== Turkey ===
- Istambul, Atik Mustafa Pasha Mosque — several tesserae were found, revealing the previous existence of mosaics panels n the building
- Istambul, Chalke Gates (destroyed) — the vestibule’s interior decoration is described by Procopius: the walls were decorated with slabs of multi-colored marble, while the ceilings were covered with mosaics, which depicted Justinian and his wife Theodora flanked by the Senate, as well as the victories of Belisarius in the Vandalic and Gothic wars and his triumphal return bearing spoils, defeated kings and kingdoms to his emperor.
- Istambul, Hagia Sophia — emperor Alexander mosaic (912); Southwestern entrance mosaic (from 944)
- Istambul, Church of Myrelaion (Bodrum Mosque) — was originally decorated with a marble revetment and mosaics, which disappeared totally
- Istambul, Monastery Theotokos tou Lisbos / Church of Constantine Lips (Fenari Isa Mosque) — the vaults were decorated with mosaic. One mosaic icon «Saint Eudocia» in pietre dure survived (now in Istanbul Archaelogical Museum).
- Istambul, Monastery of Stoudios — one fragment in Benaki museum survived
- Mount Kasios, Monastery of Saint Barlaam — scattered tesserae on ground in the apse and south of the south west pier.
Hagia Sophia, Emperor Alexander mosaic

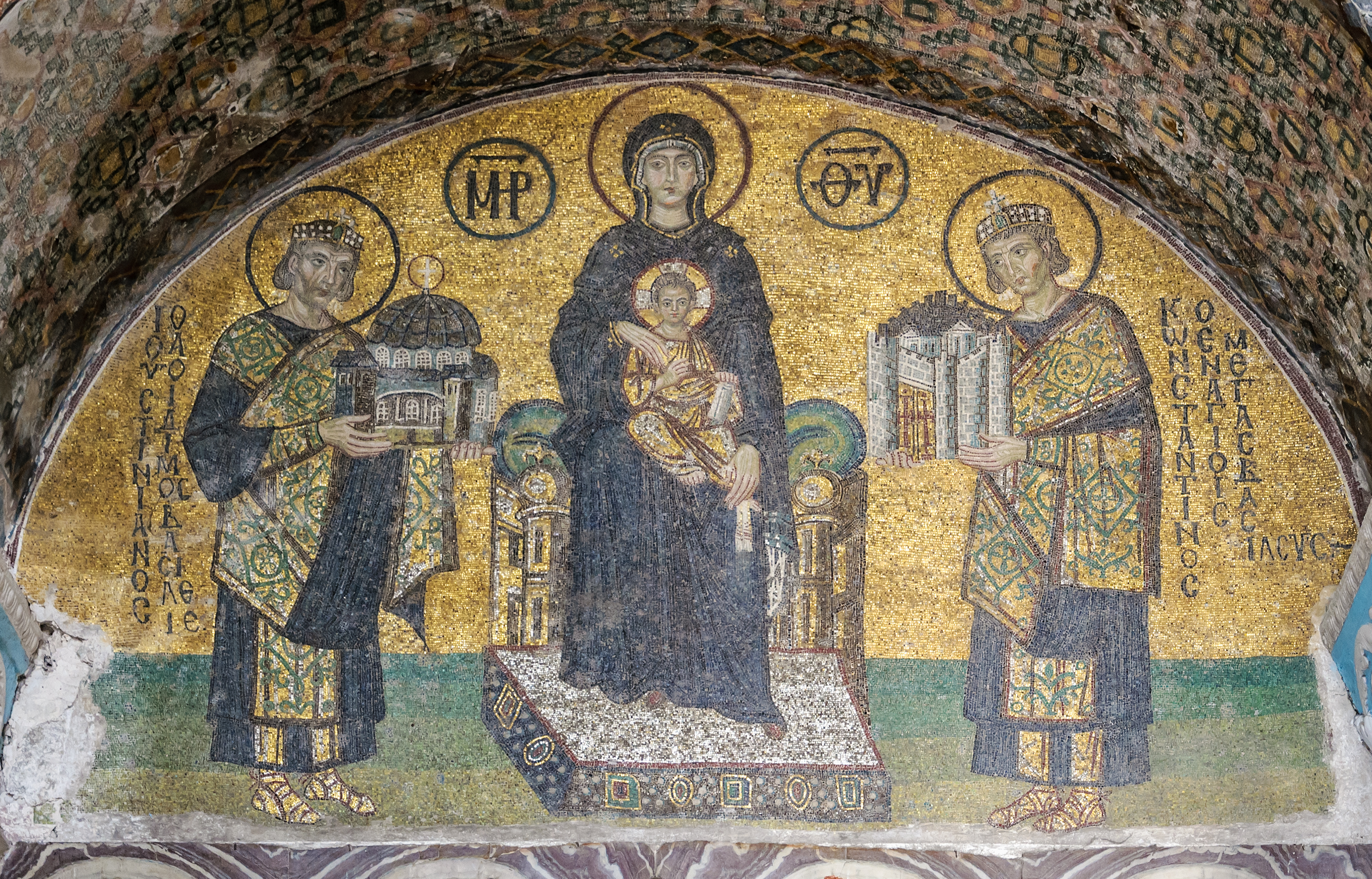
Hagia Sophia, Southwestern entrance mosaic

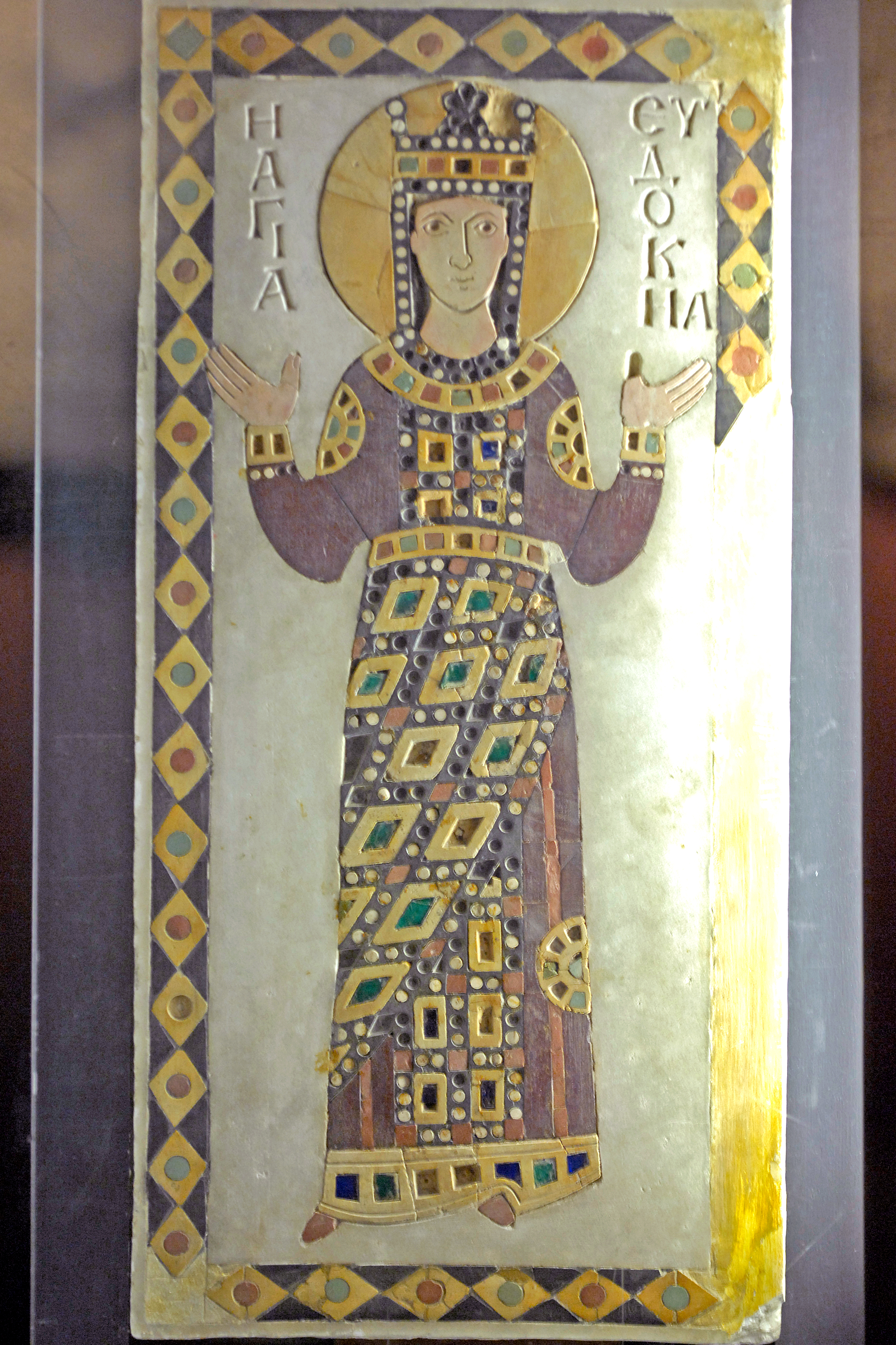
Aelia Eudocia mosaic icon

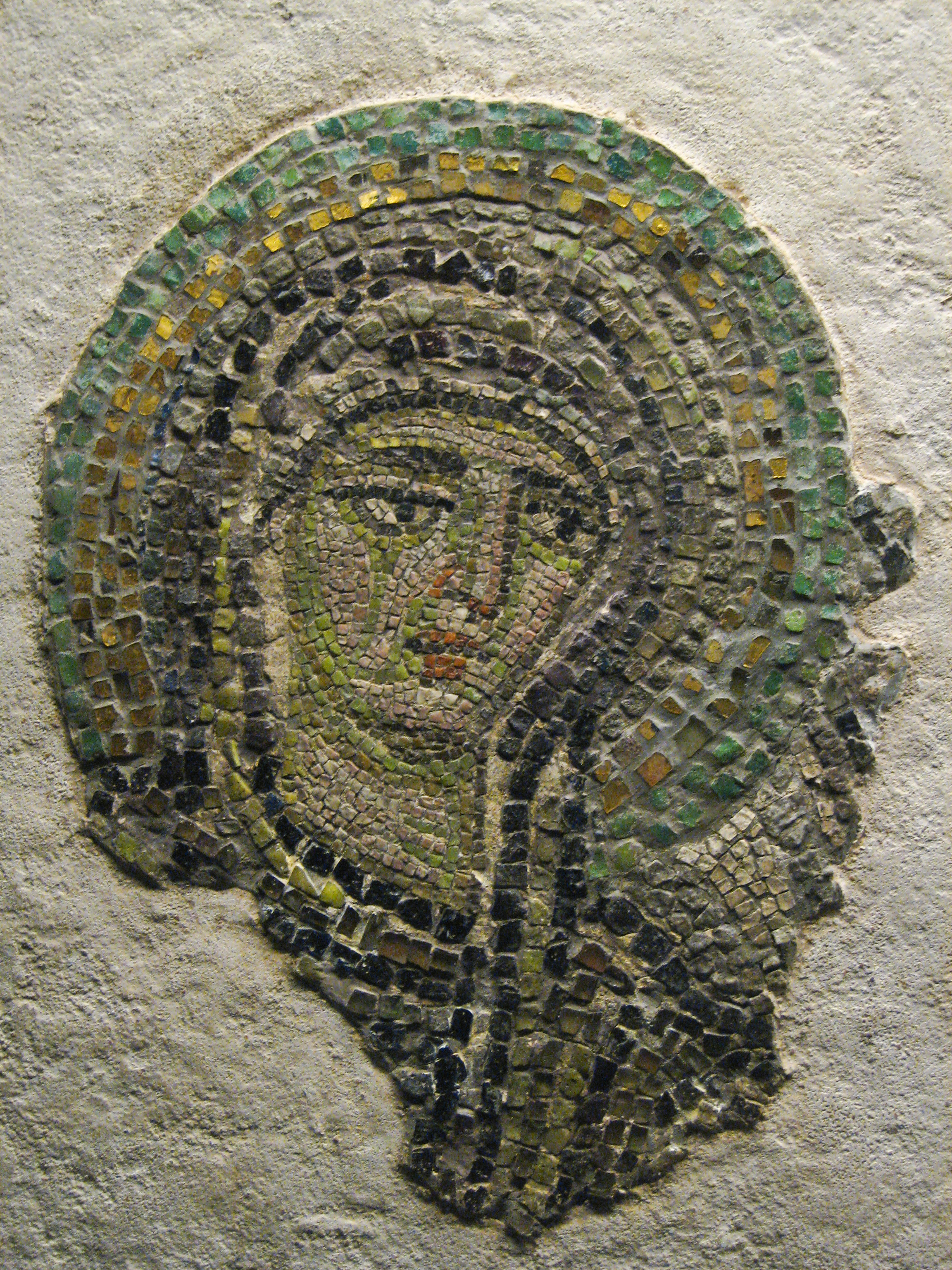
Monastery of Stoudios

== 11th century ==
=== Israel, Jerusalem ===
Islamic mosaic:

- Al-Aqsa Mosque — central archway covered in vegetal mosaics
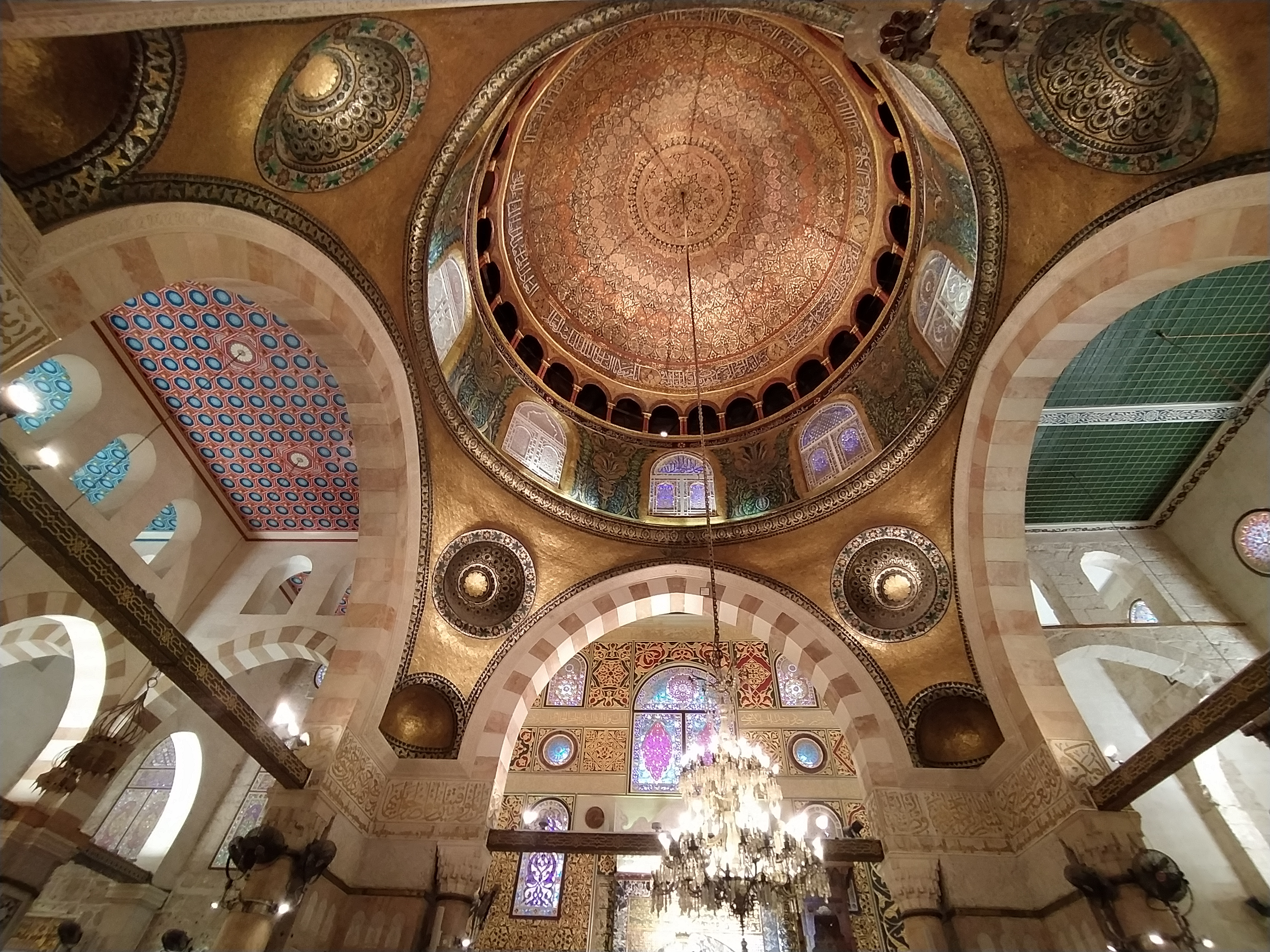

=== Italy ===
- Bitonto, Bitonto Cathedral — area archelogica, mosaic floor fragments
- Civate, Abbey of San Pietro al Monte — mosaic with New Jerusalem
- Cortona, Mosaic from destroyed church San Andrea in Piazza Signorelli, Cortona
- Grottaferrata, Church of S. Maria in the Territorial Abbacy of Saint Mary of Grottaferrata — arch mosaic
- Pavia, floor mosaics from churches Santa Maria del Popolo, Sant’Invenzio and Santa Maria delle Stuoie, now in Musei civici (Pavia)
- Ravenna, Sant’Apollinare in Classe — mosaic floor of the Canopy of Saint Eleucadius
- Salerno, Salerno Cathedral of San Matteo
- San Benigno Canavese (Turin), Abbey of Fruttuaria / Abbazia di Fruttuaria — fragments of floor
- Torcello (Veneto), Torcello Cathedral of Santa Maria Assunta — first Last Judgment mosaic on the counterfacade
- Trieste, Trieste Cathedral of San Giusto
- Venice, Basilica di San Marco — the oldest mosaics, dating from the late 11th century
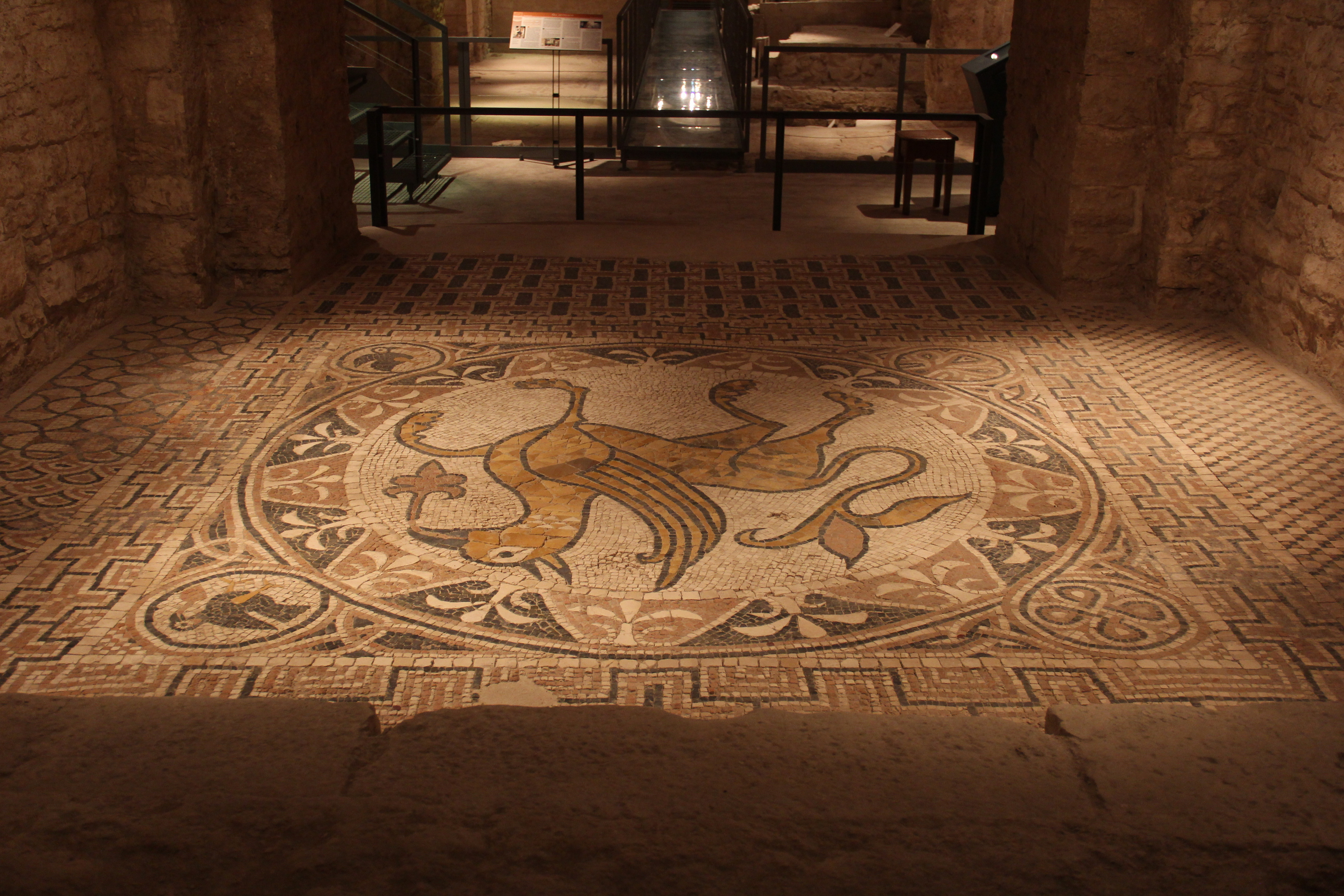
Bitonto

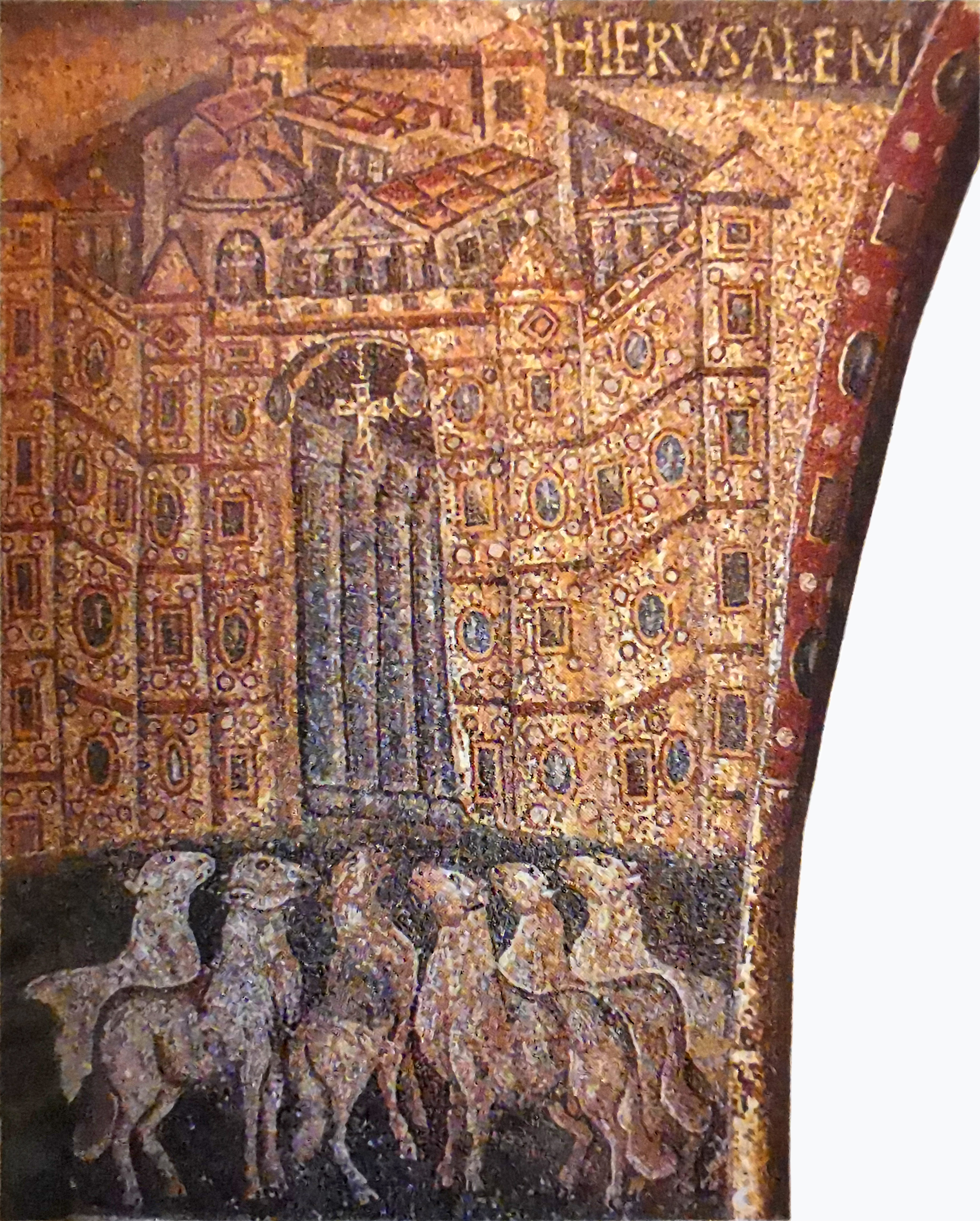
San Pietro al Monte

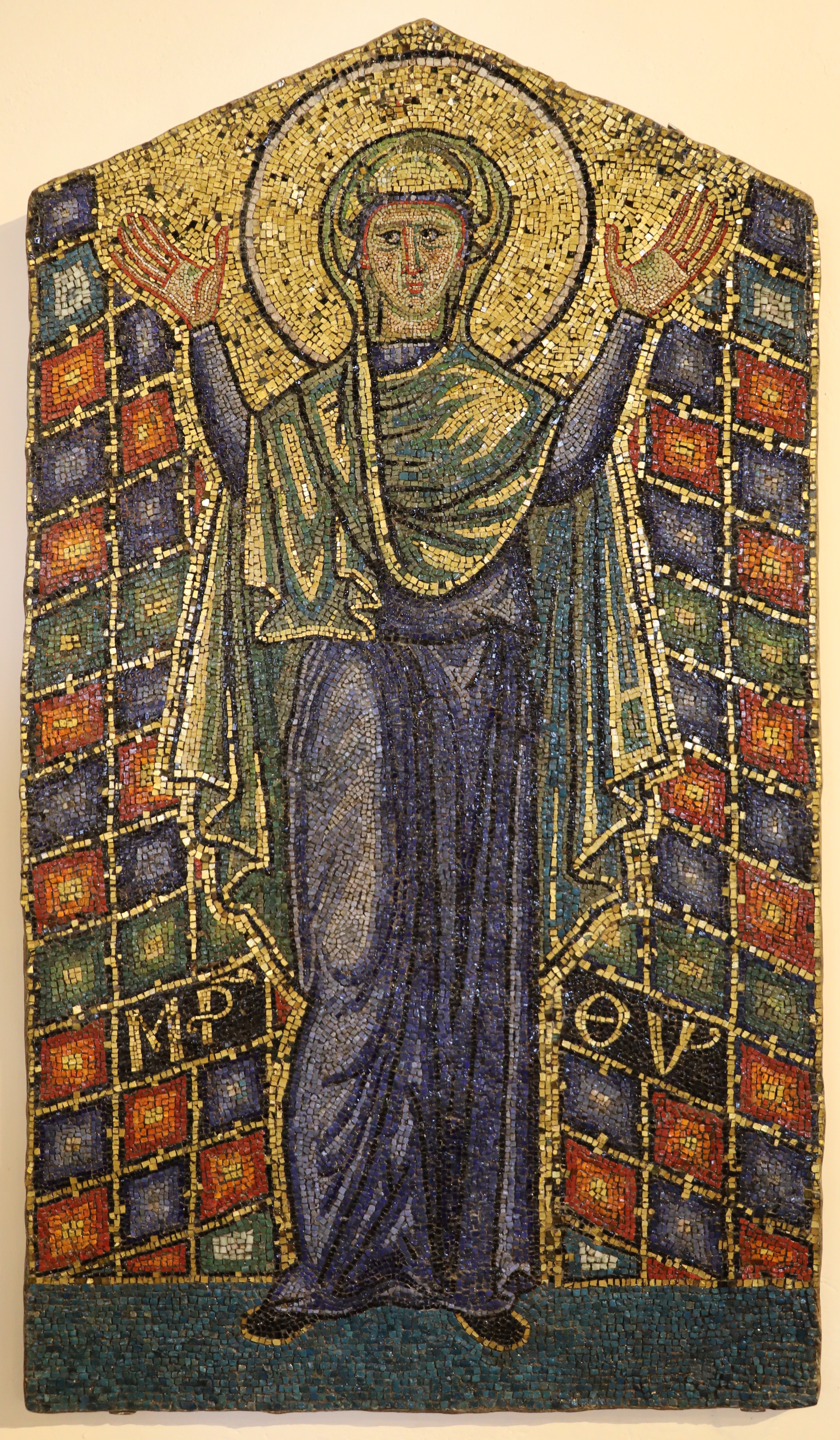
Cortona

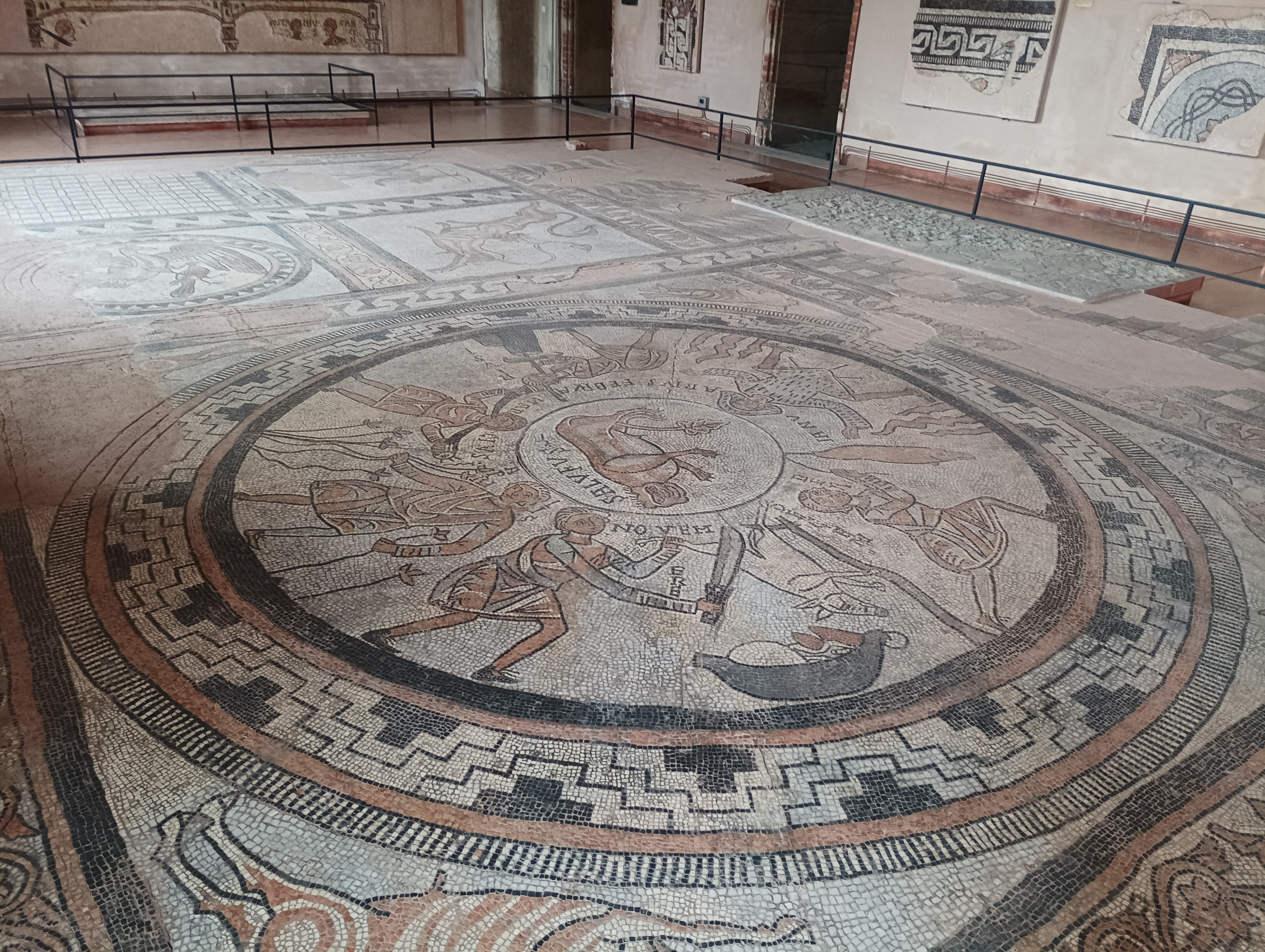
Musei civici (Pavia)

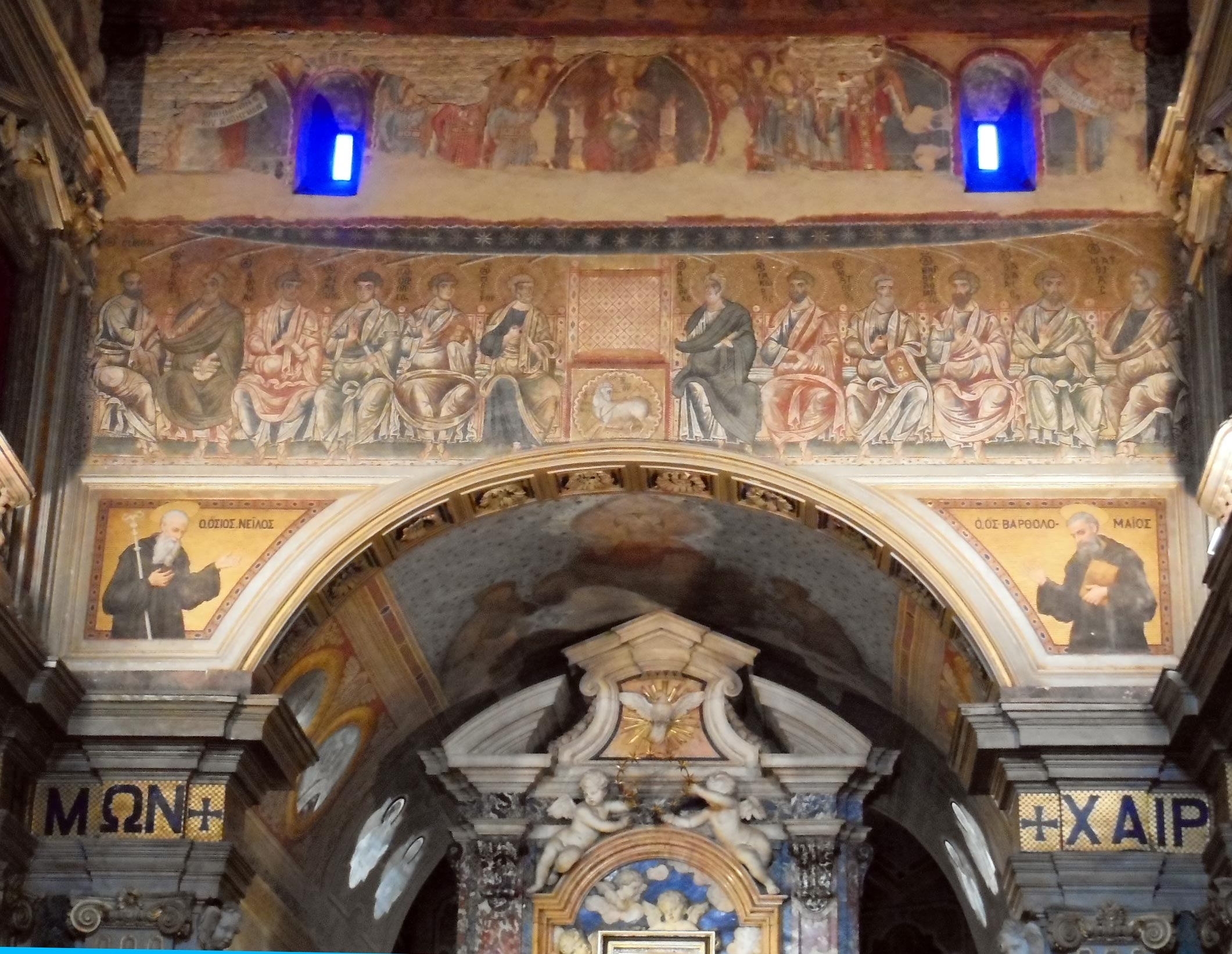
Grottaferrata

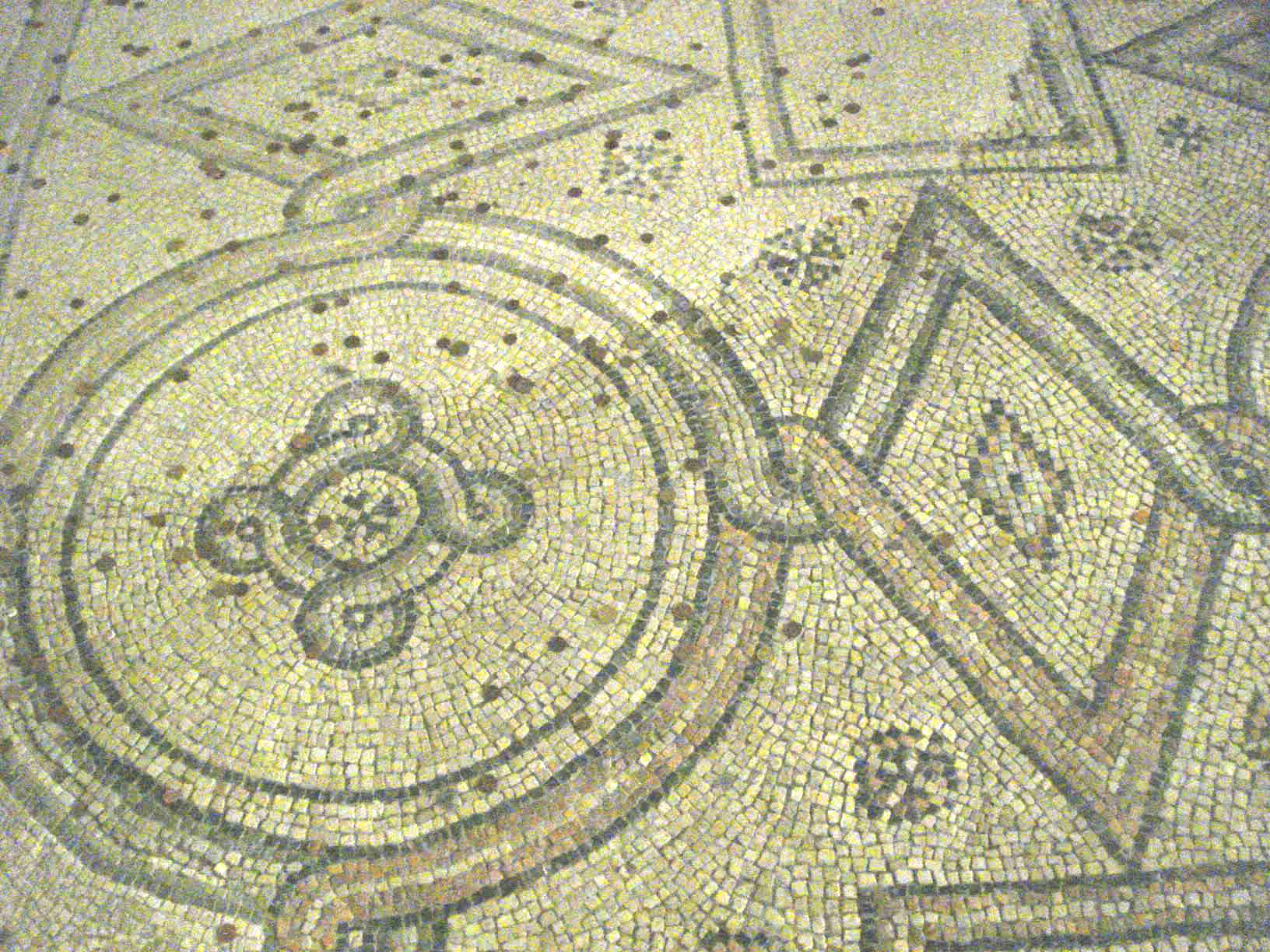
Sant'Apollinare in Classe

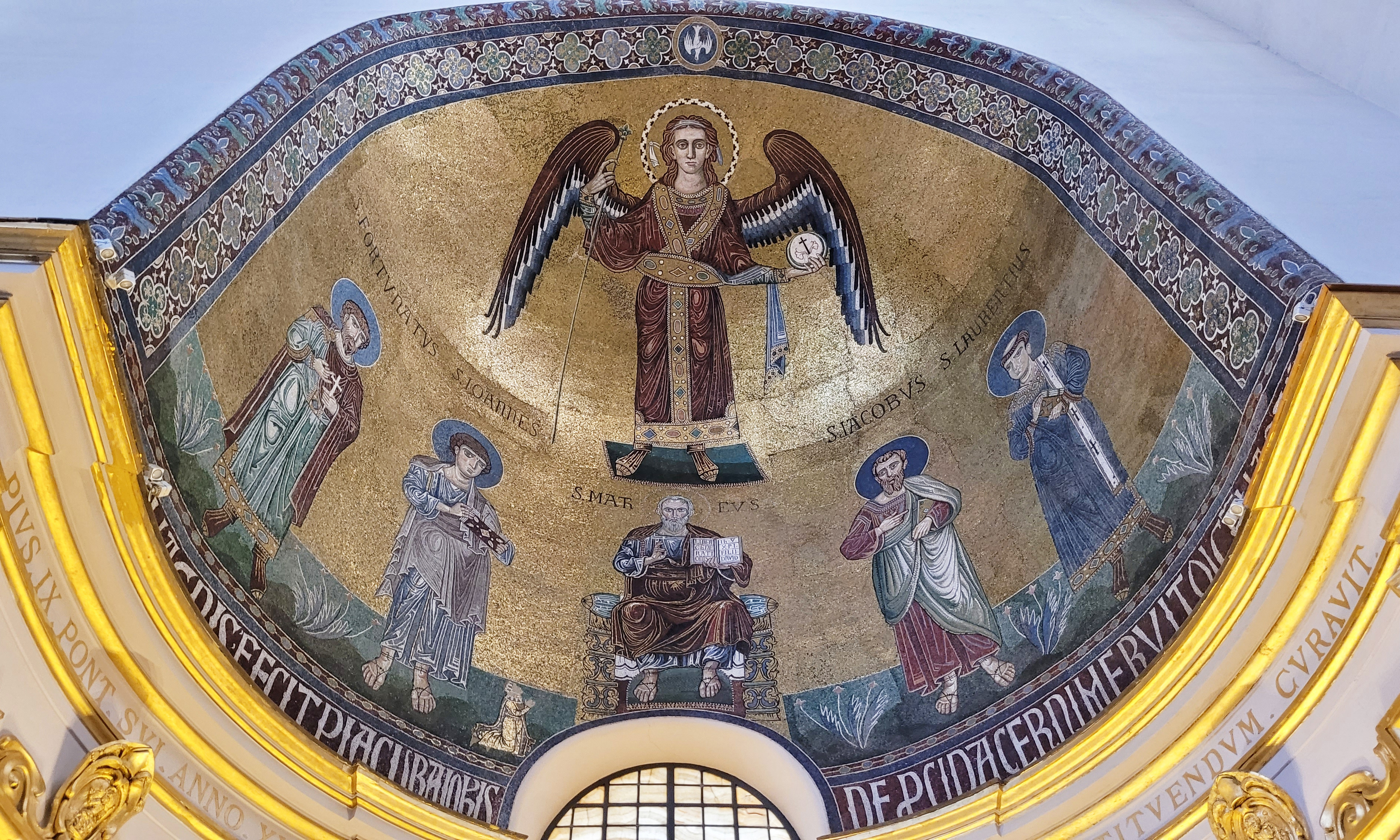
Salerno

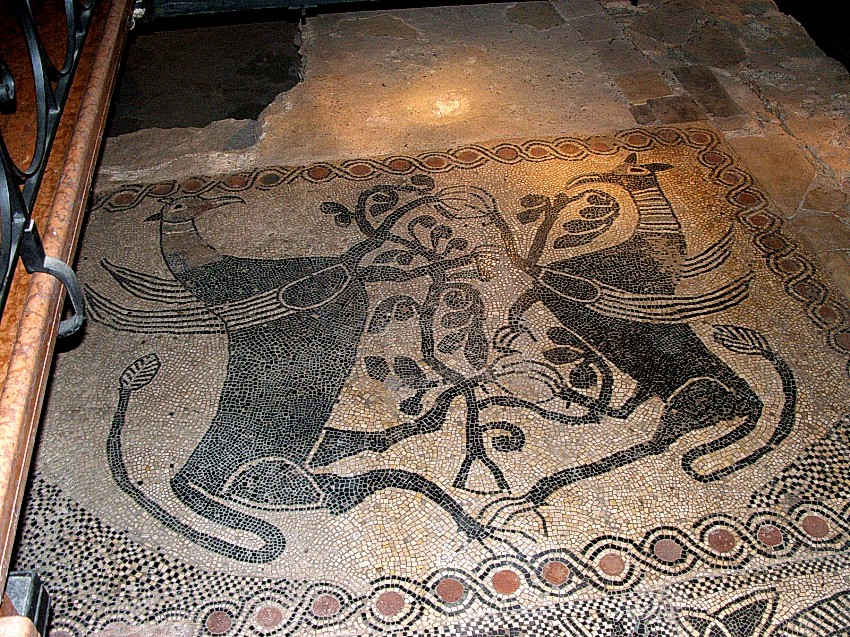
Fruttuaria

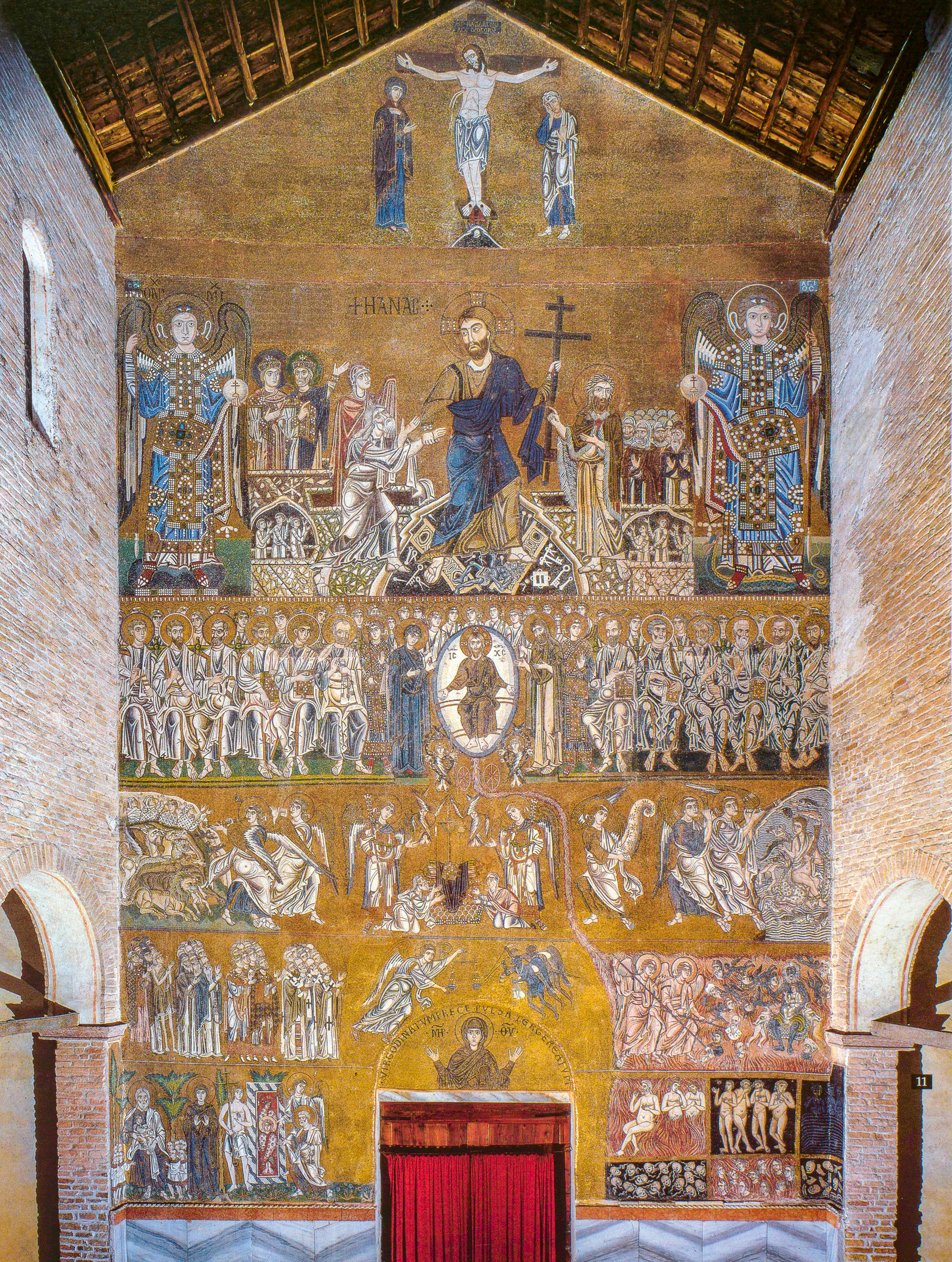
Torcello

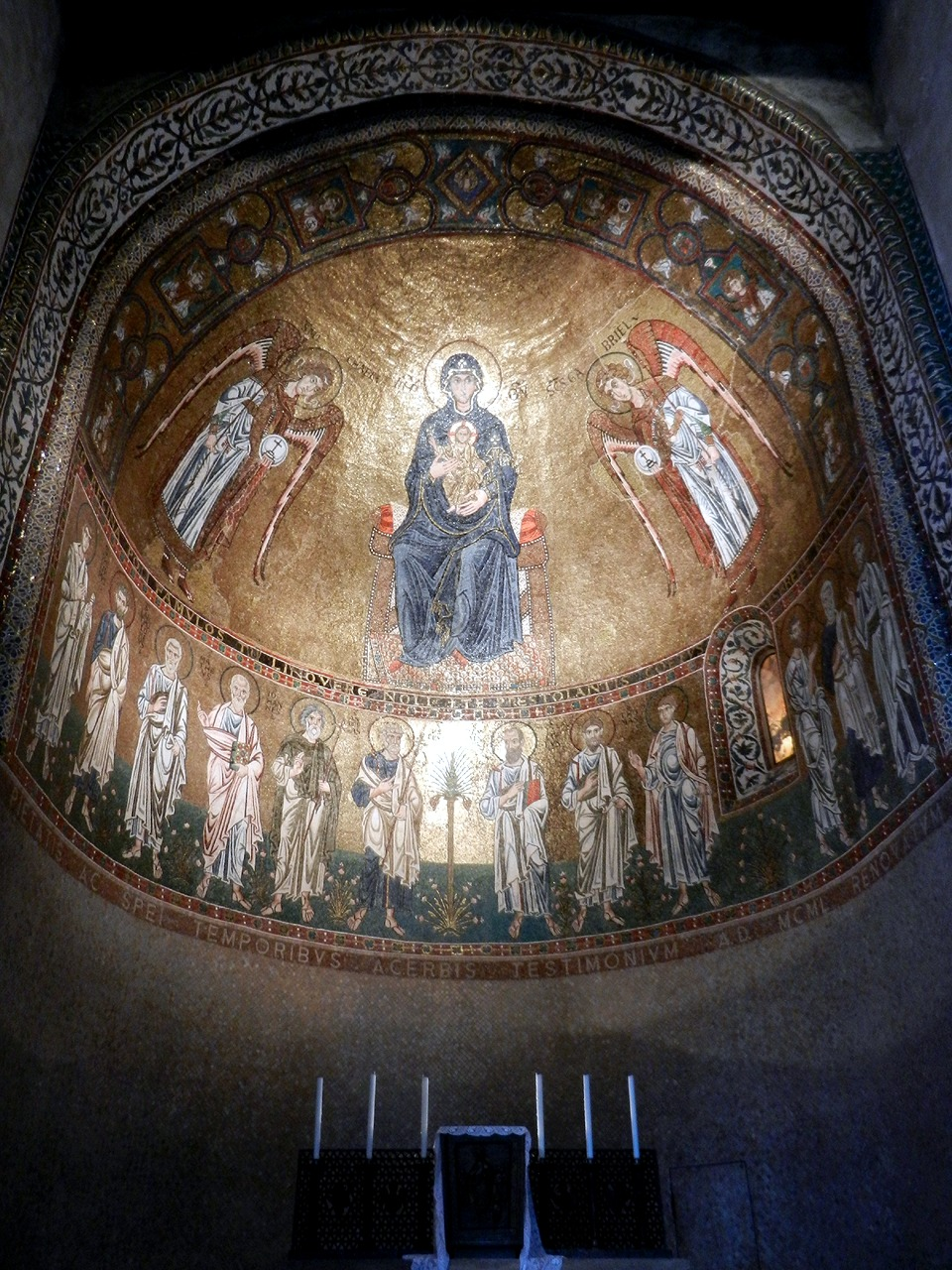
Trieste

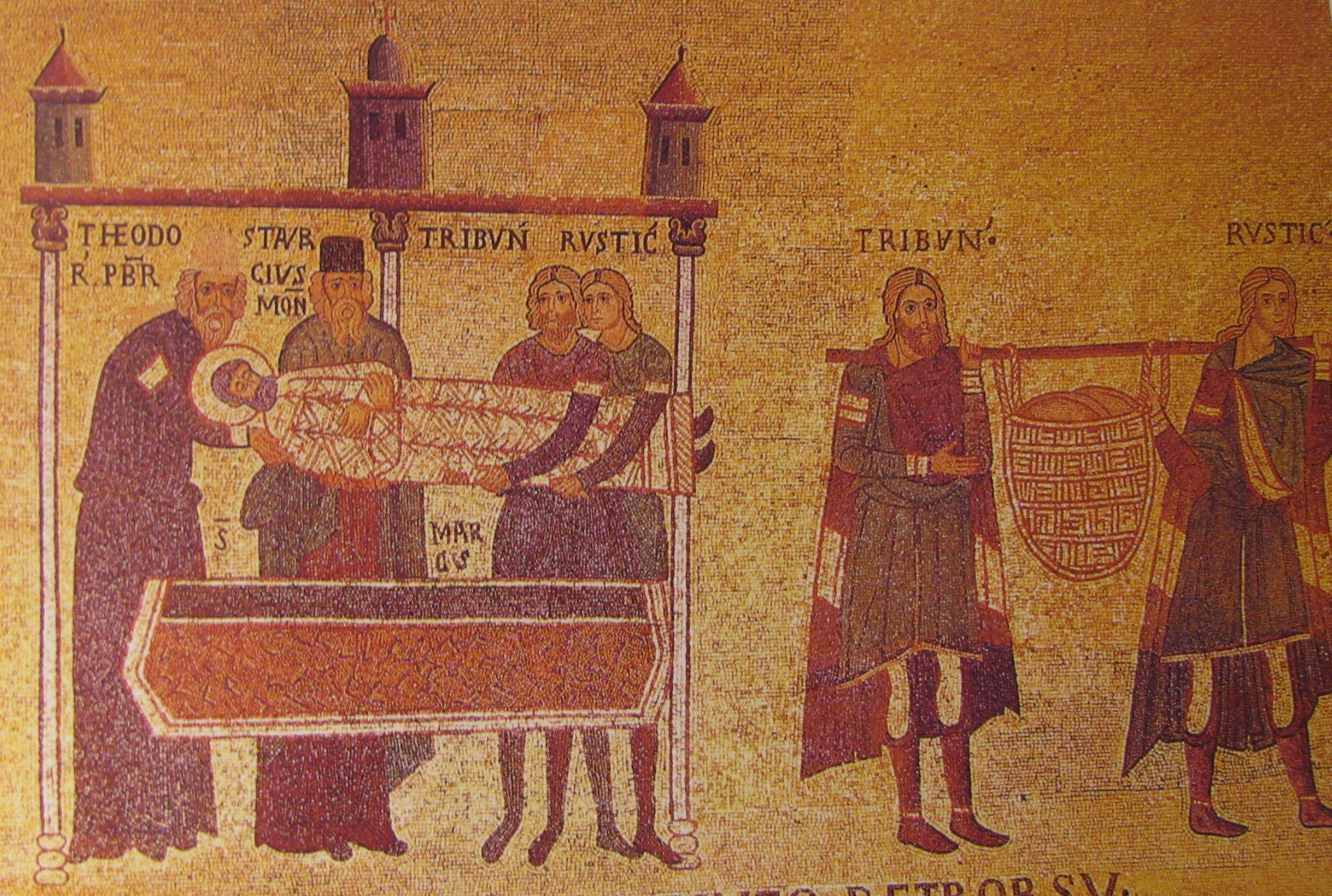
San Marco

=== Greece ===
- Athens, Daphni Monastery
- Mount Athos, Vatopedi Monastery — mosaics in Katholikon, scene of the Annunciation (between the beginning of the 11th and the beginning of the 12th century), one with the Deisis (late 11th or early 12th century), and one with a bust of St Nicholas (?).
- Chios island, Monastery of Nea Moni
- Distomo (Boeotia), Monastery of Hosios Loukas
- Serres (Central Macedonia), Saints Theodore Tyro and Theodore Stratelates Church (Hagioi Theodoroi)- above the altar was a mosaic "The Communion of the Apostles, " from which the figure of the Apostle Andrew has been preserved.
- Thessaloniki, Church of Hagia Sophia — some fragments?
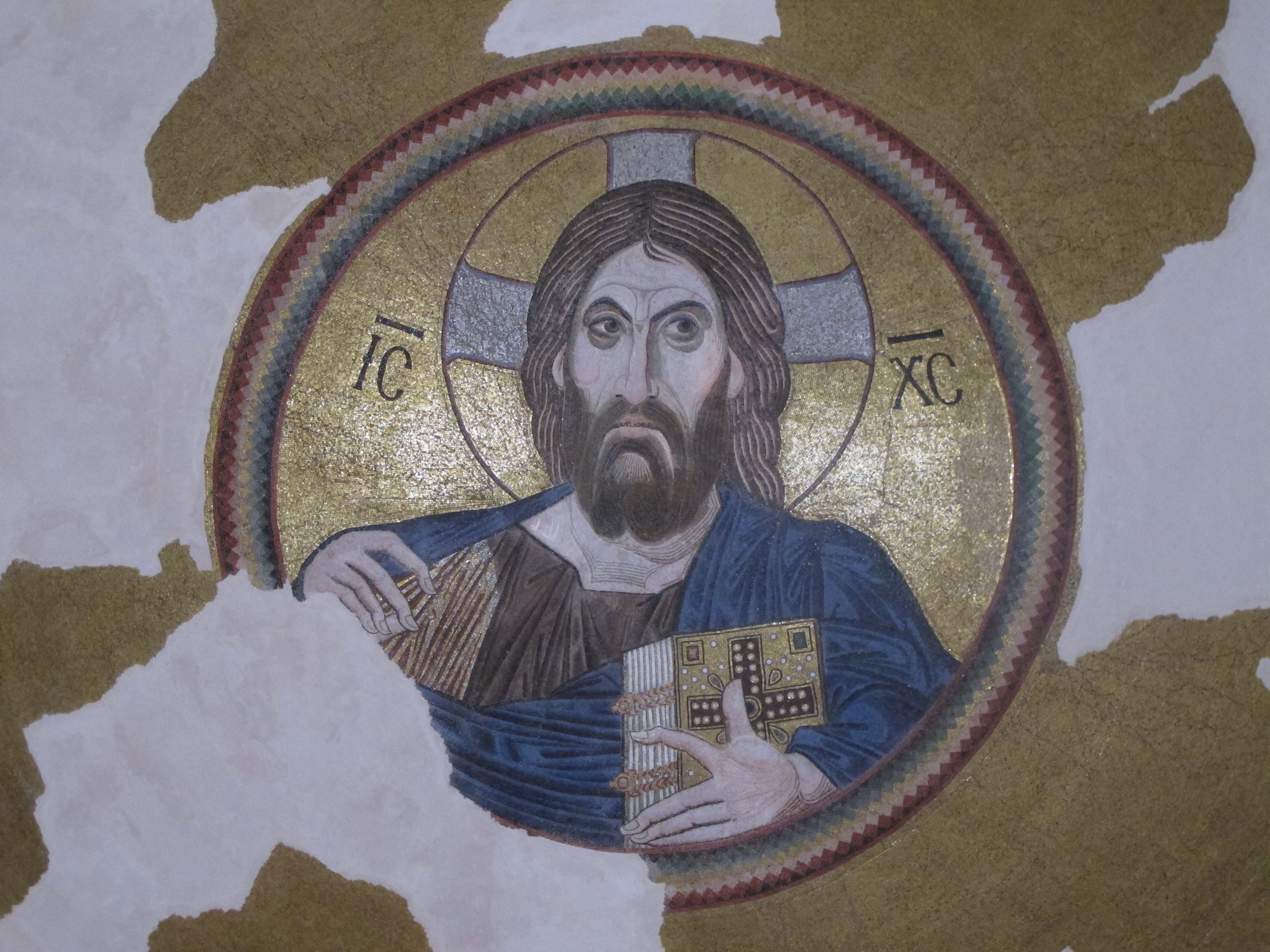
Daphni Monastery

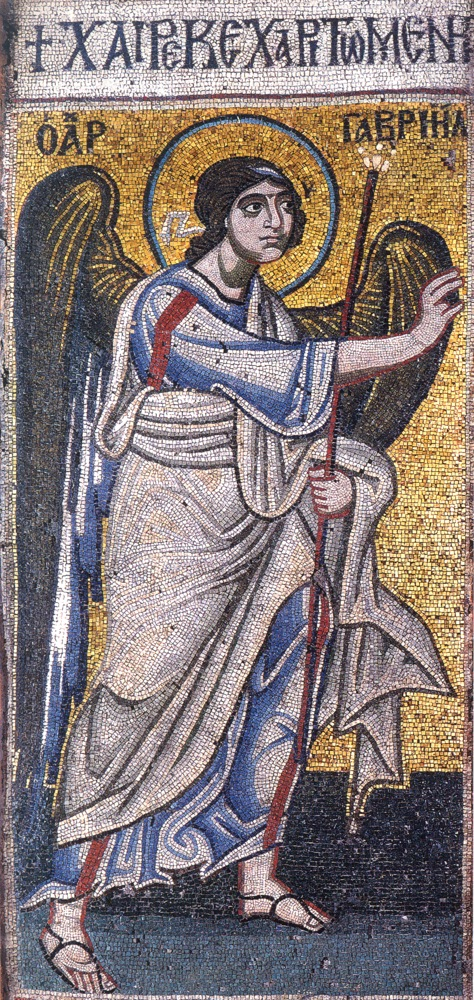
Vatoped

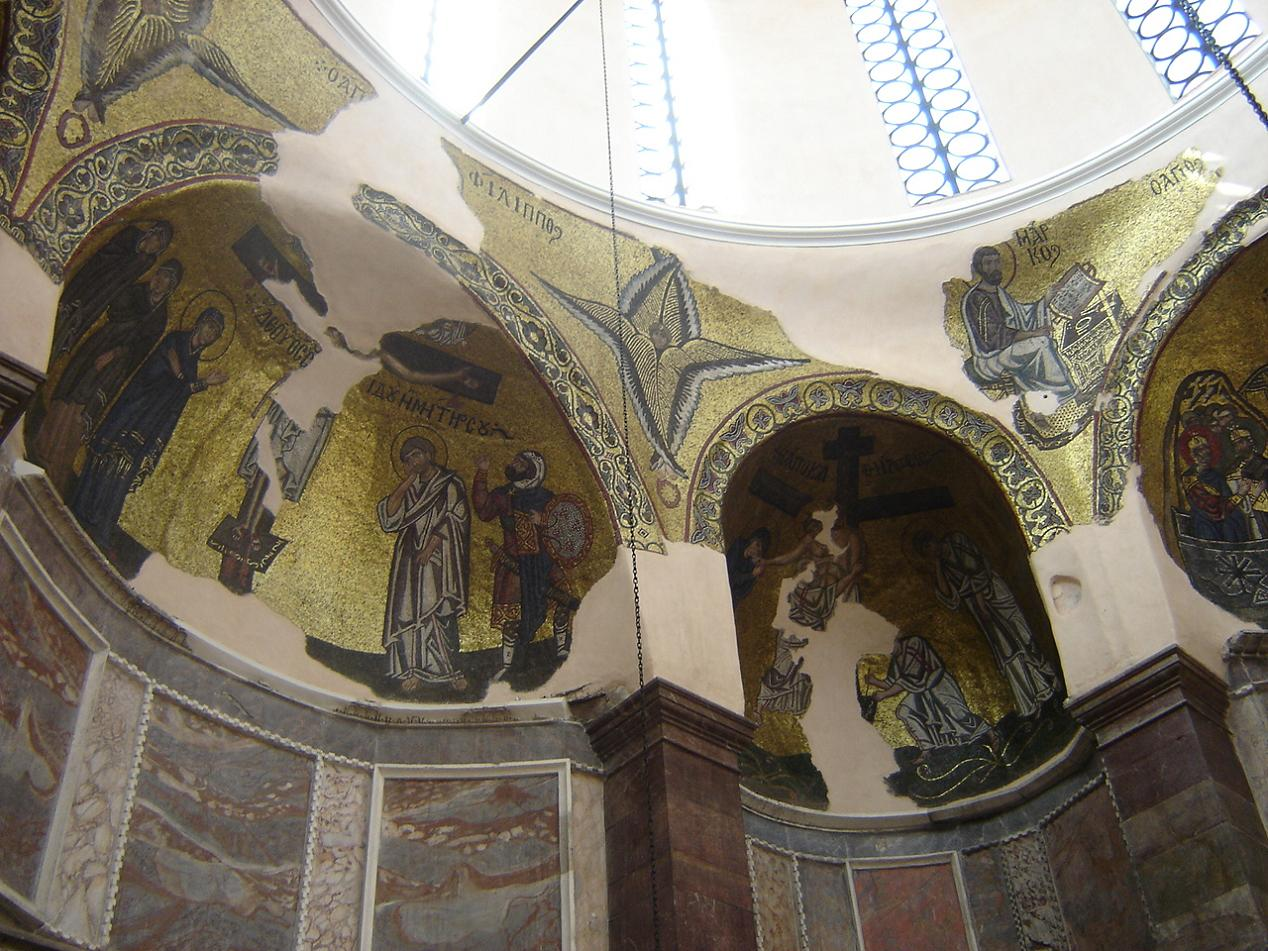
Nea Moni

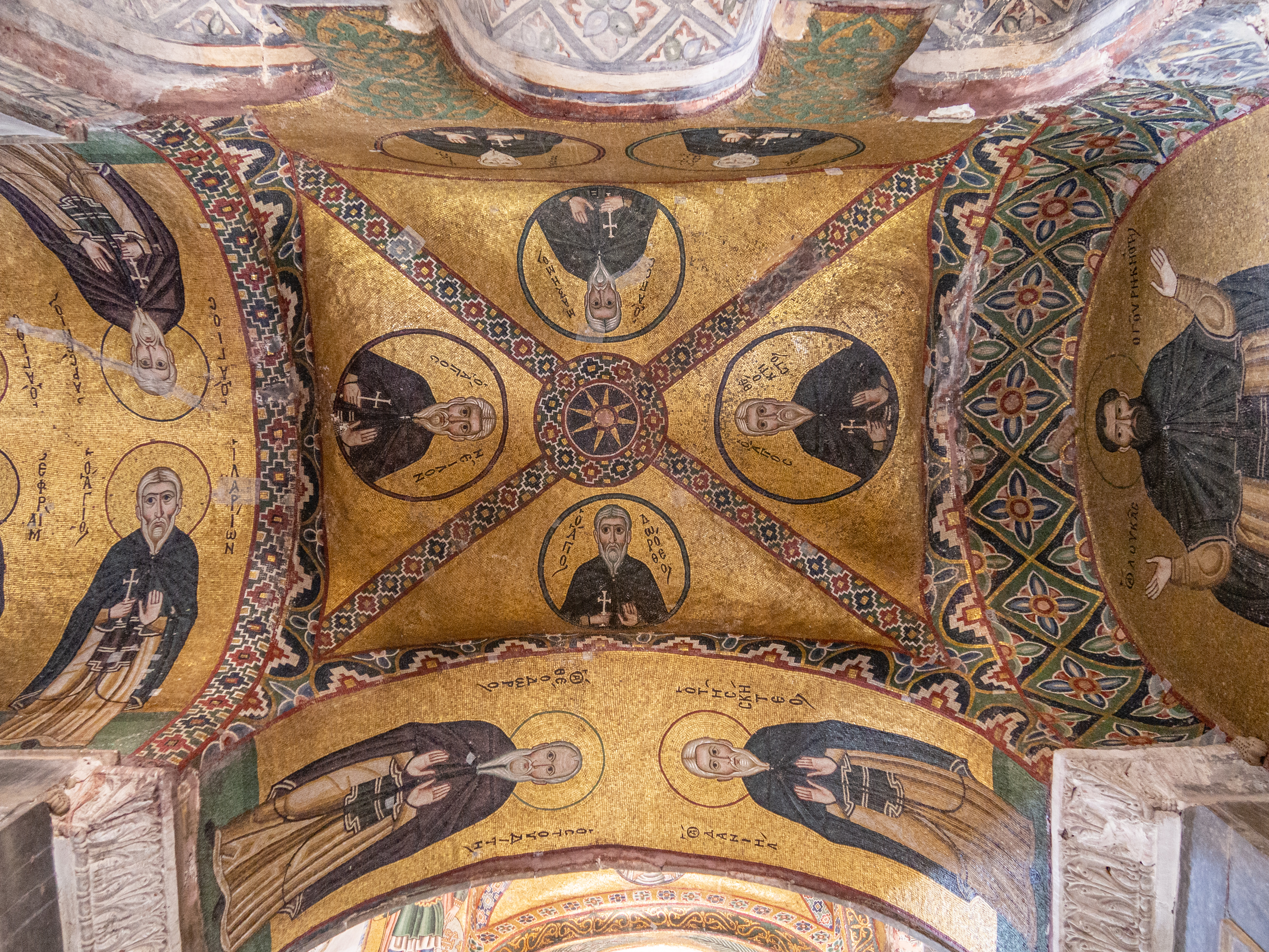
Hosios Loukas

=== Ukraine, Kyiv ===
- Saint Sophia Cathedral (about mosaics see uk:Мозаїки Софійського собору) (after 1037), one of them is Orans of Kyiv
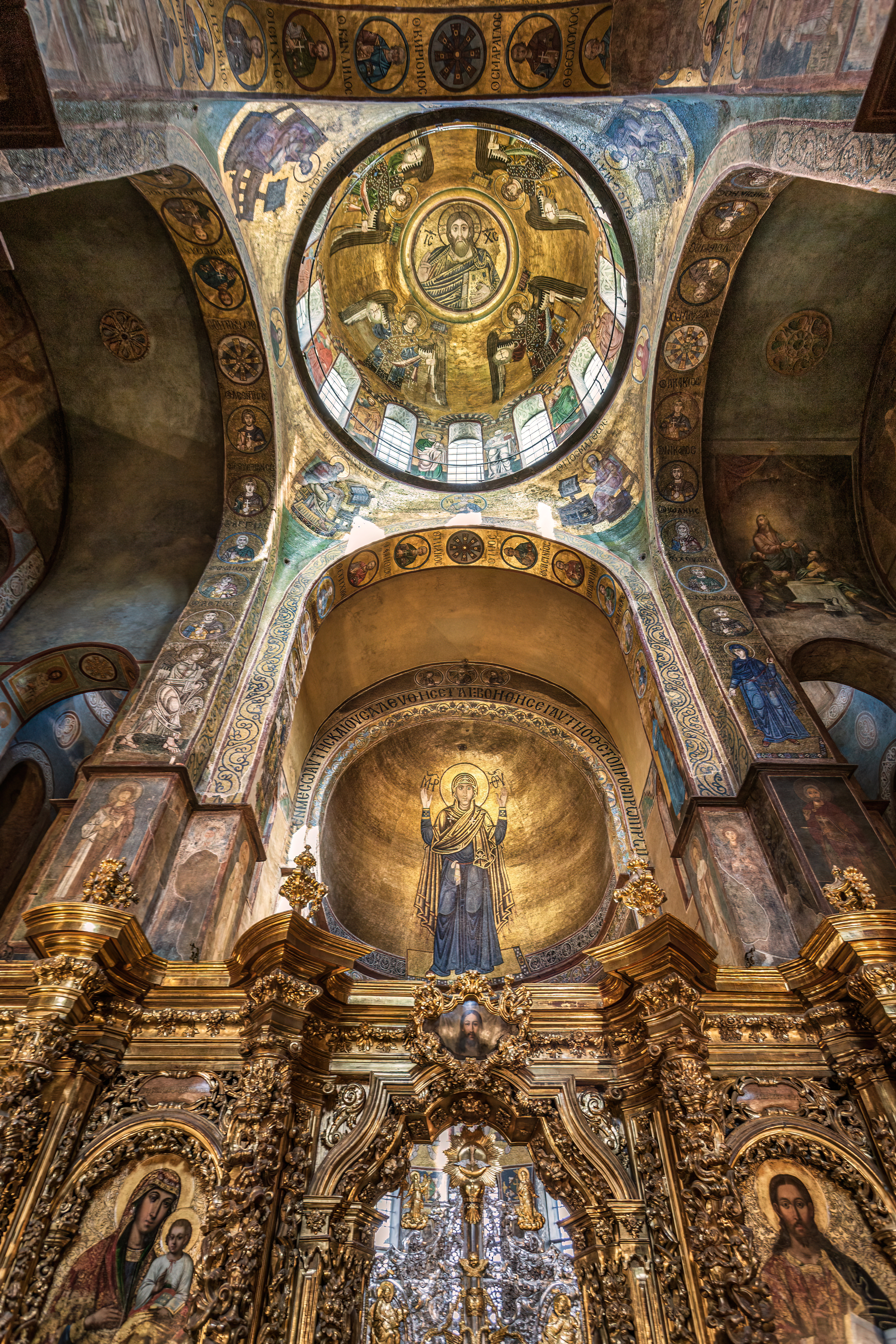

=== Turkey, Istanbul ===
- Hagia Sophia — Empress Zoe mosaic
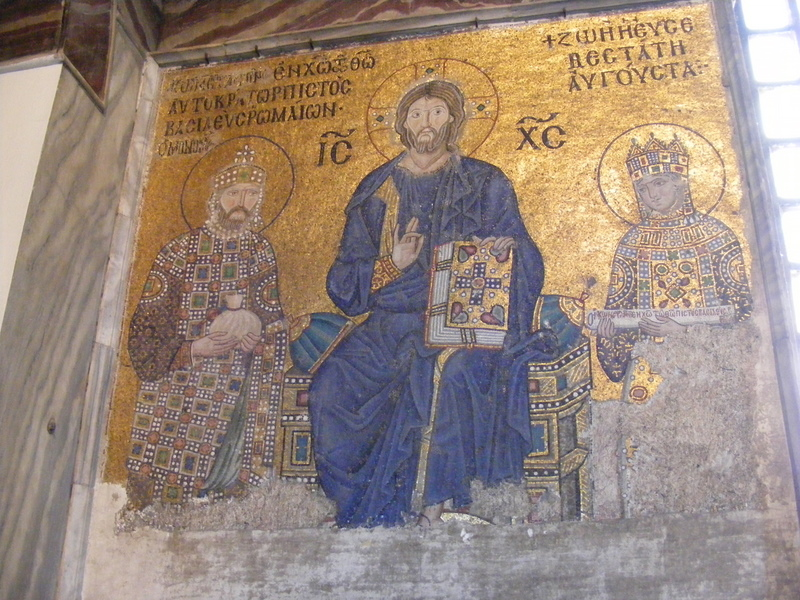
Hagia Sophia, Empress Zoe mosaic

== 12th century ==
=== Italy ===
- Casale Monferrato, Casale Monferrato Cathedral / Cattedrale di Sant’Evasio — mosaic in museum
- Ivrea, The Liberal Arts — part of a mosaic coming probably from the floor of the Cathedral of Ivrea, now placed in a wall of the Episcopal Seminary, Ivrea
- Ferrara, Ferrara Cathedral (of Saint George) — fragment of mosaic from the original cathedral church (in museum). Or possibly it is about some fragment in ex-cathedral, now San Giorgio fuori le mura
- Murano, Venice, Church of Santa Maria e San Donato (1141) — mosaic cosmatesque floor with ornaments of confronted animals
- Otranto, Otranto Cathedral (1066) — huge floor mosaic, inscription of Pantaleone. Same workshop made mosaic floors in Lecce, Trani, Taranto and Brindisi (only fragments survived). Orans mosaic in apse
- Ravenna, Church of San Apollinare in Classe — Saints Luke and Matthew mosaics at the Triumphal arch
- Ravenna, Ravenna Cathedral / Ursiana Church — some fragments in museum
- Venice, Basilica di San Marco — apse, vaulting, nave, transept, several cupolas, vaults, Clement Chapel
- Vercelli, Mosaic floor fragment «Mosaico di Fol e Fel» from Santa Maria Maggiore, Vercelli (now in Museo Leone, Vercelli), earliest inscription in Piemont dialect
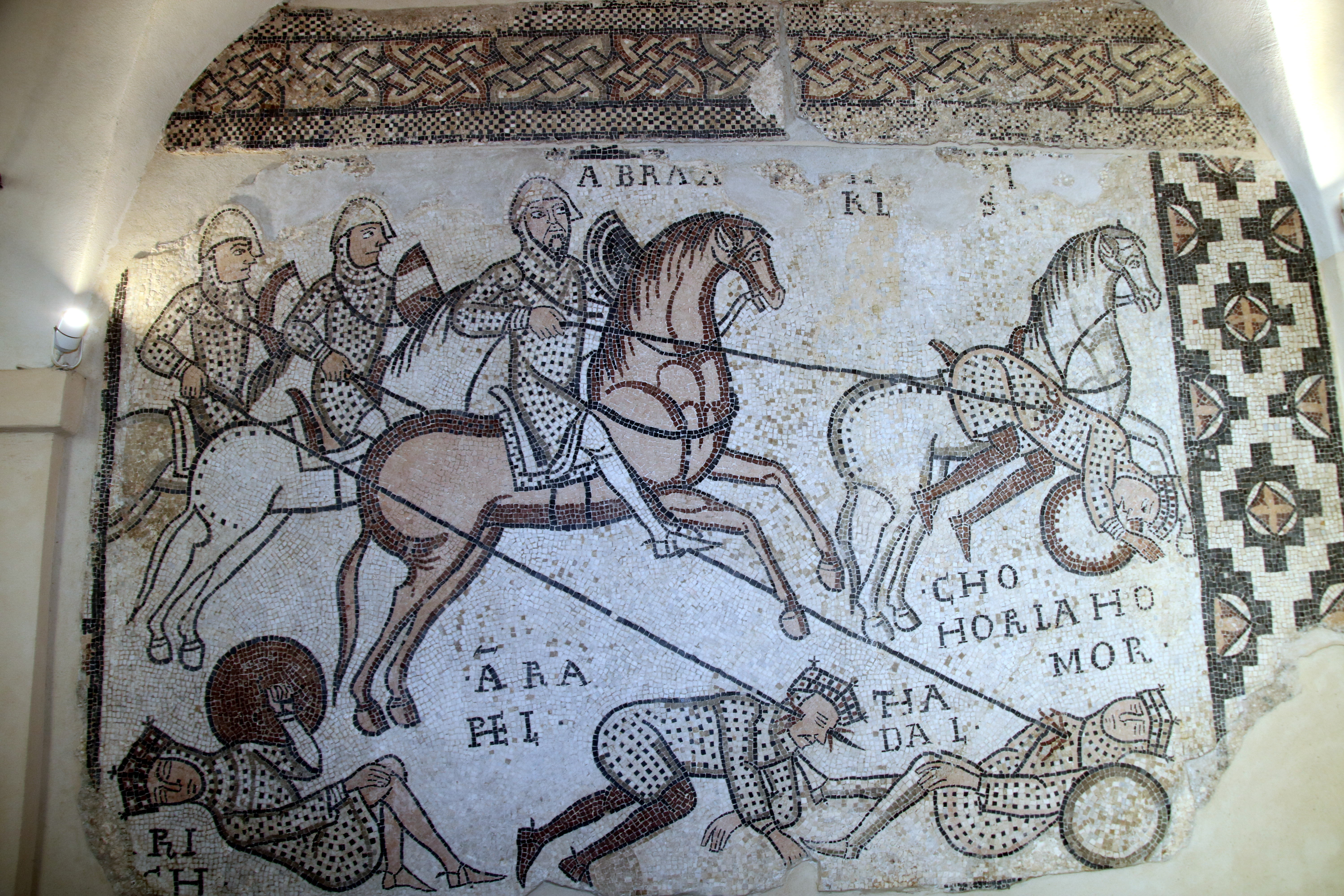
Casale Monferrato

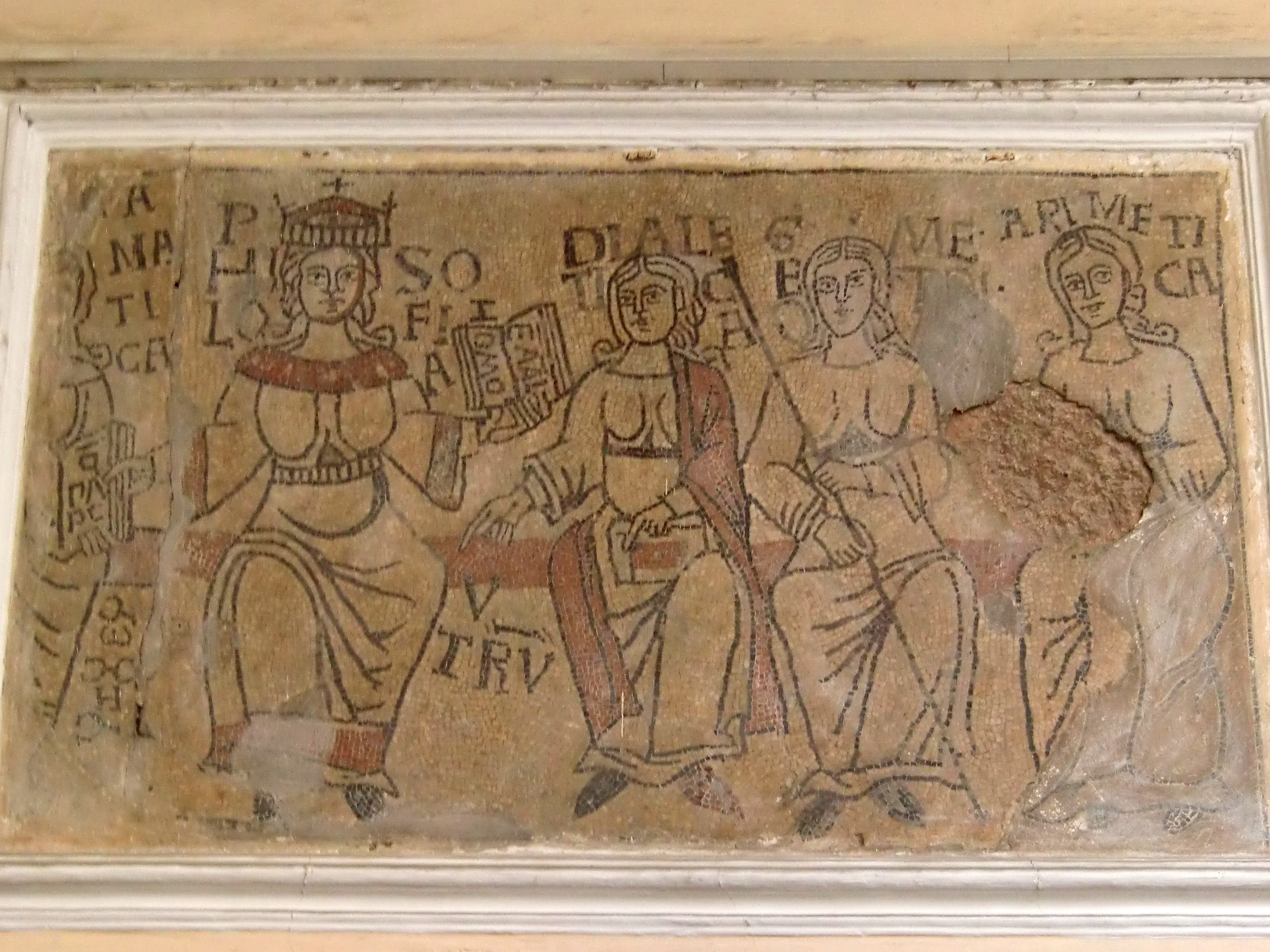
Ivrea

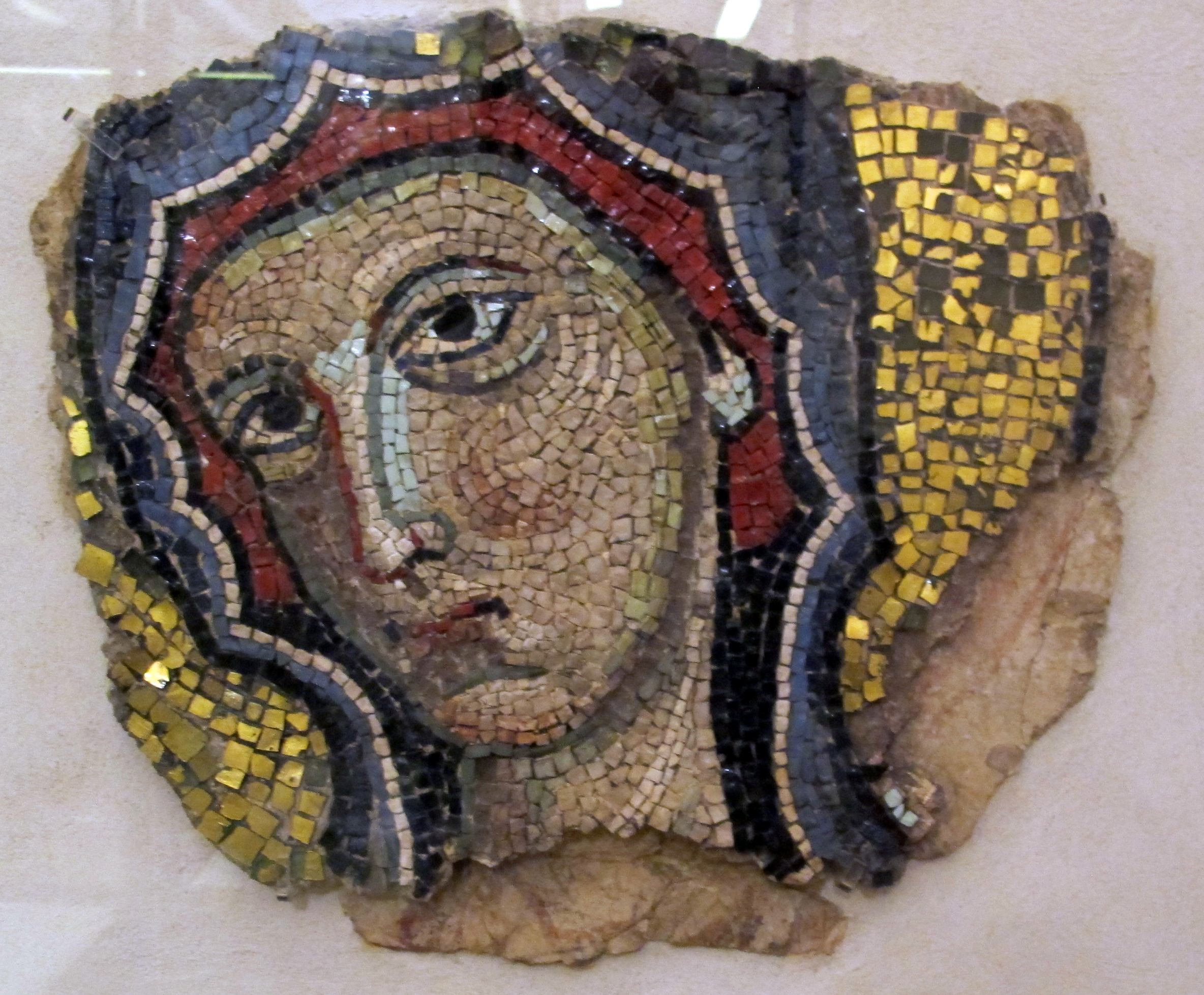
Ferrara Cathedral museum

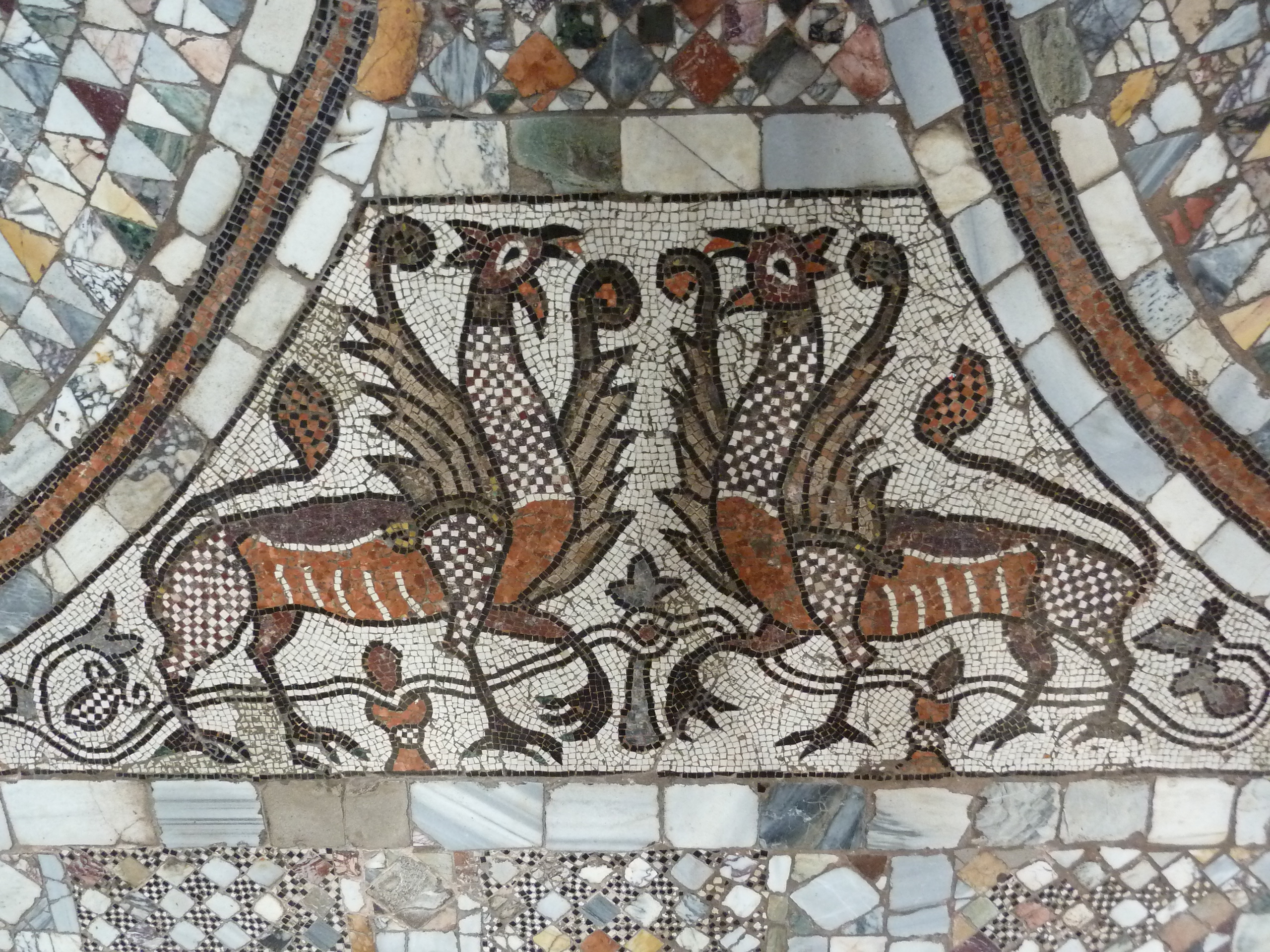
Murano

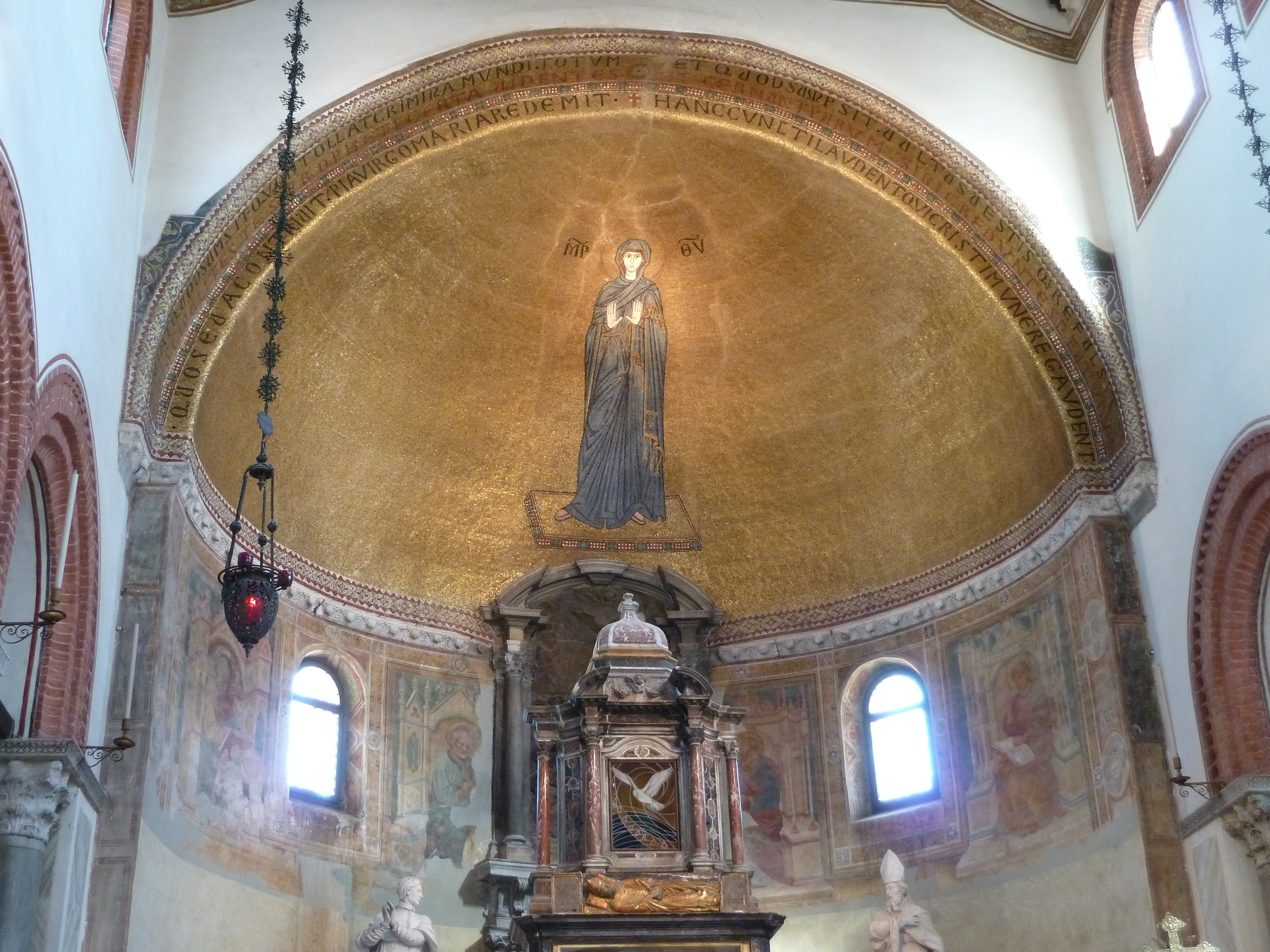
Murano

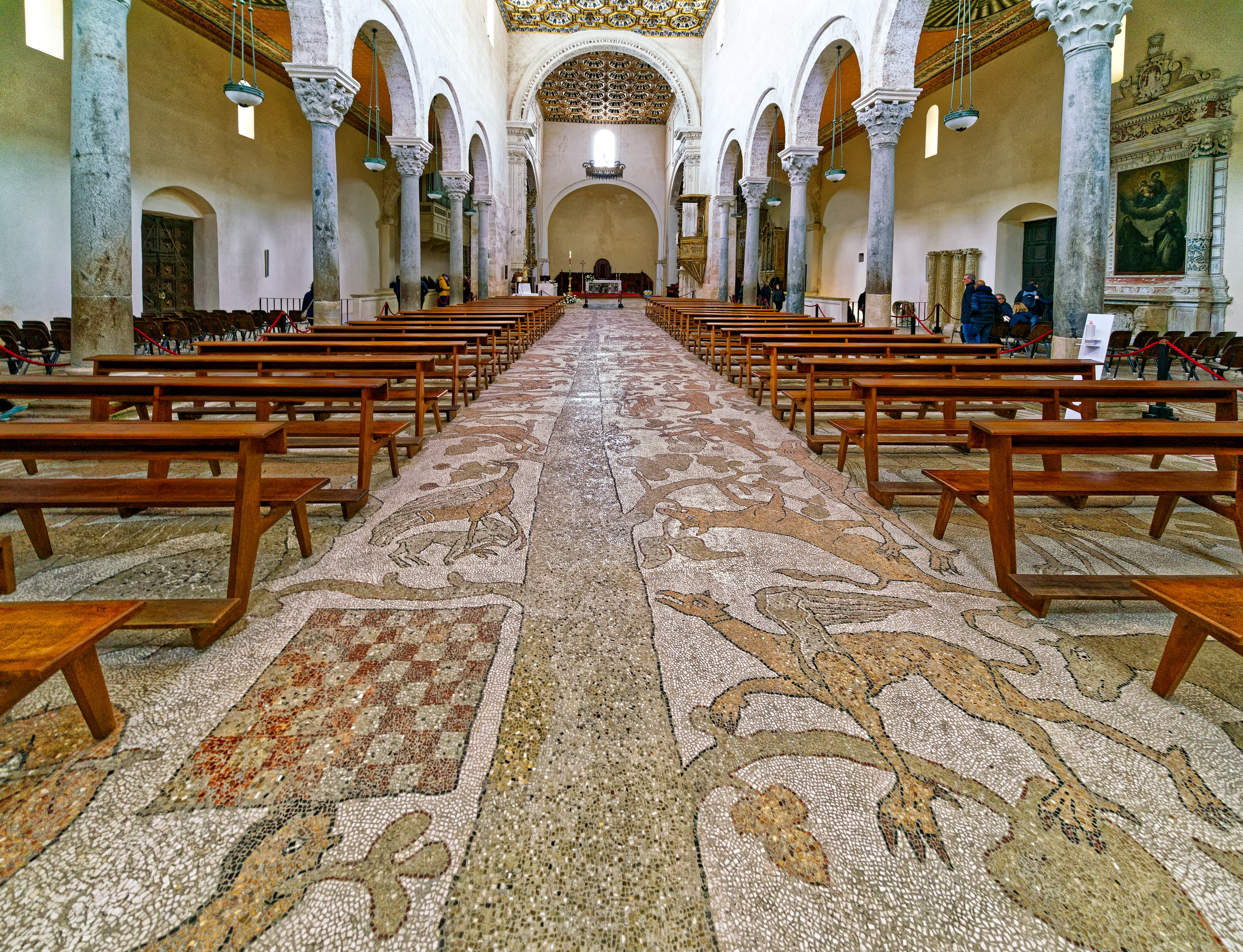
Otranto

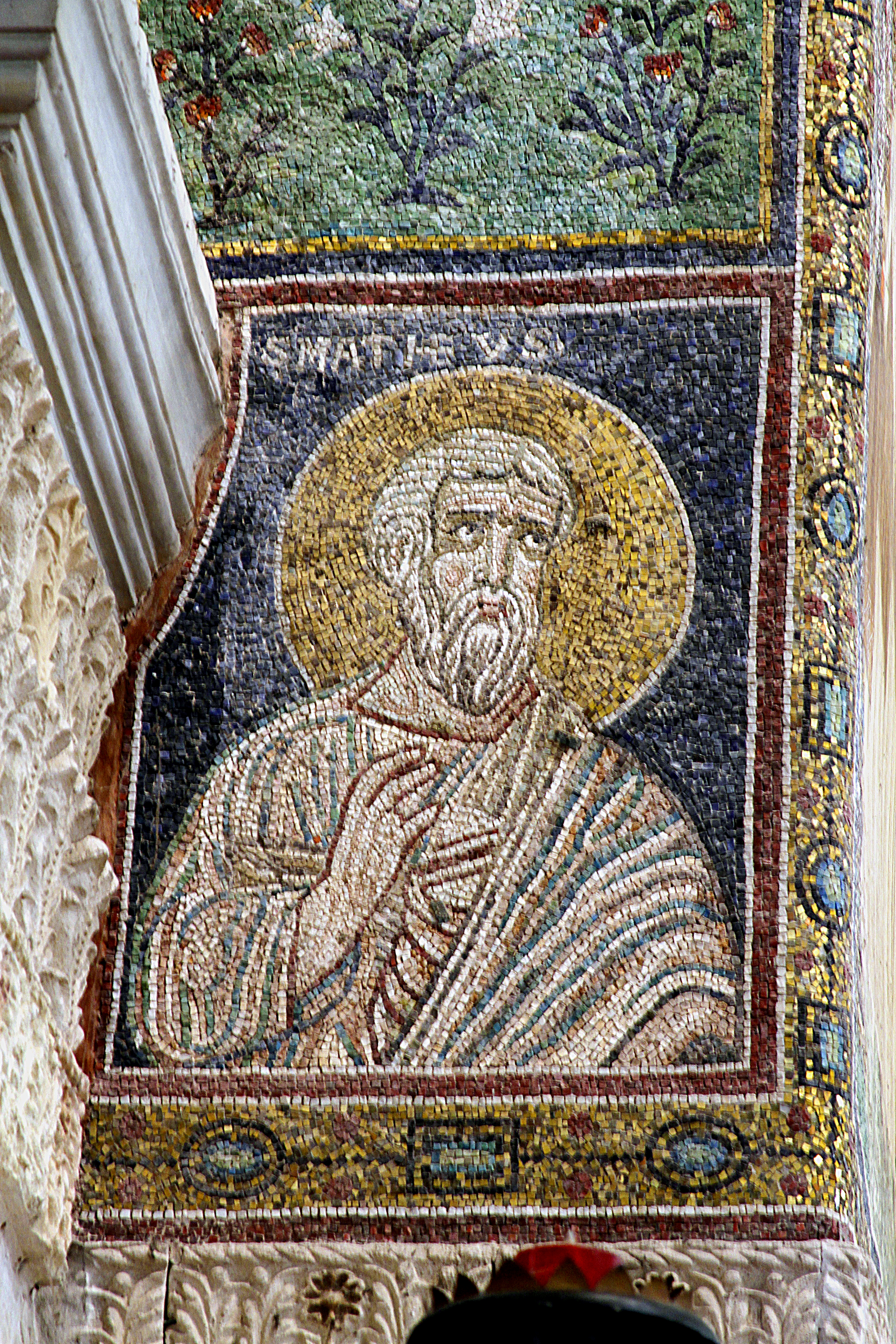
San Apollinare in Classe

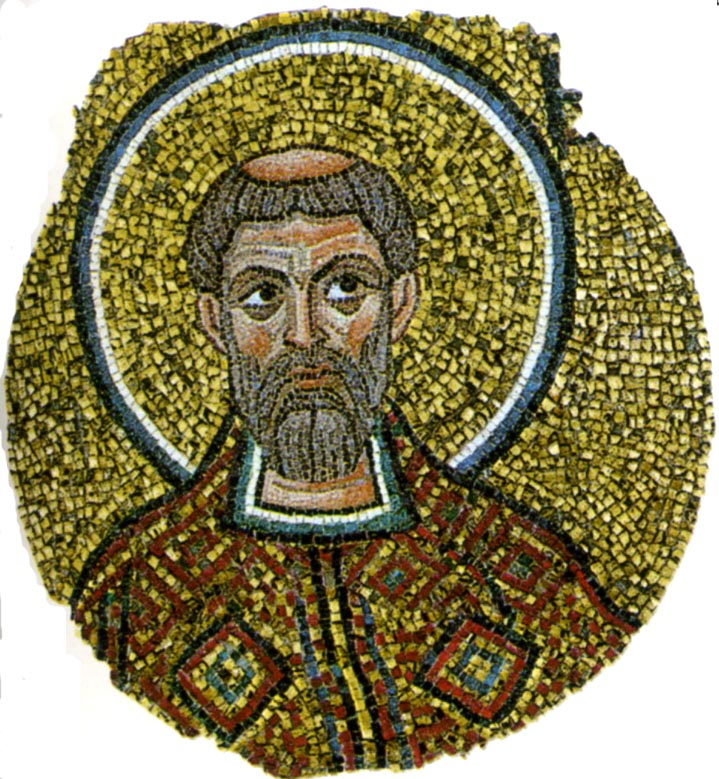
Fragment from Ursiana Church

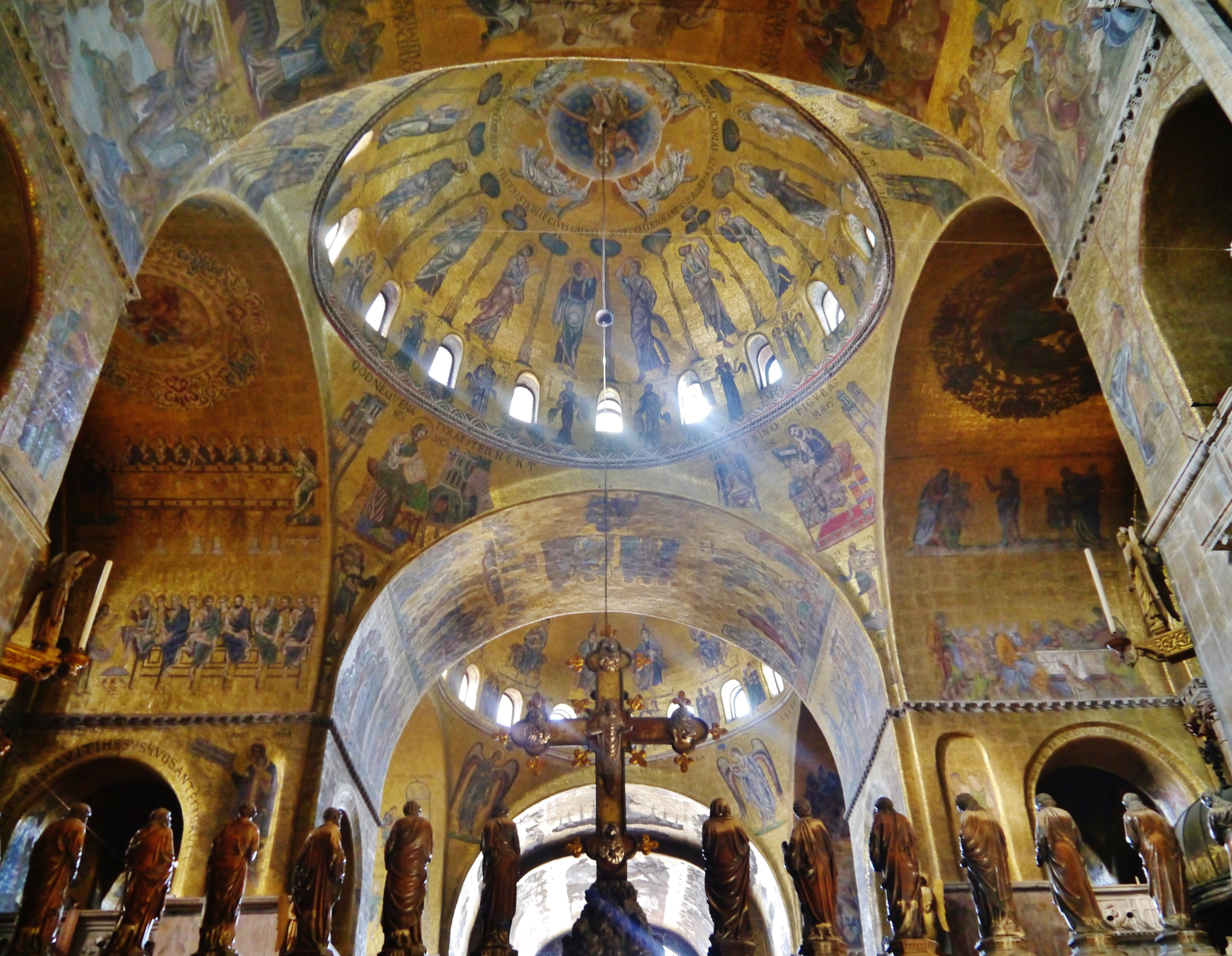
San Marco

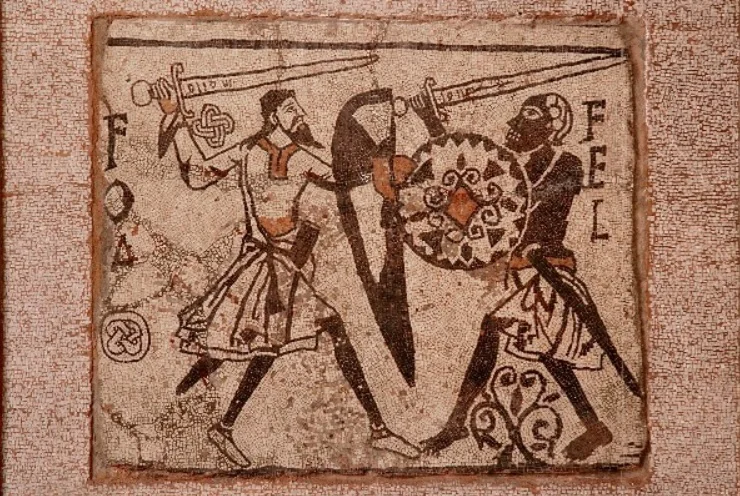
Vercelli

==== Rome ====
- Church of San Bartolomeo all'Isola (c. 1113) — fragment depicting the head and shoulders of a bearded Christ holding an open book. The mosaic is located on a wall in the church’s refectory and is not accessible for easy viewing.
- Church of San Clemente, Rome
- Church of Santa Maria in Monticelli, Rome — medallion with the head of Christ in apse
- Church of Santa Maria in Trastevere, Rome — facade and interior mosaics
- Church of S. Maria Nova (Santa Francesca Romana), Rome (1161)
- Mosaics from the old Saint Peter’s Basilica — fragments in various museums and churches
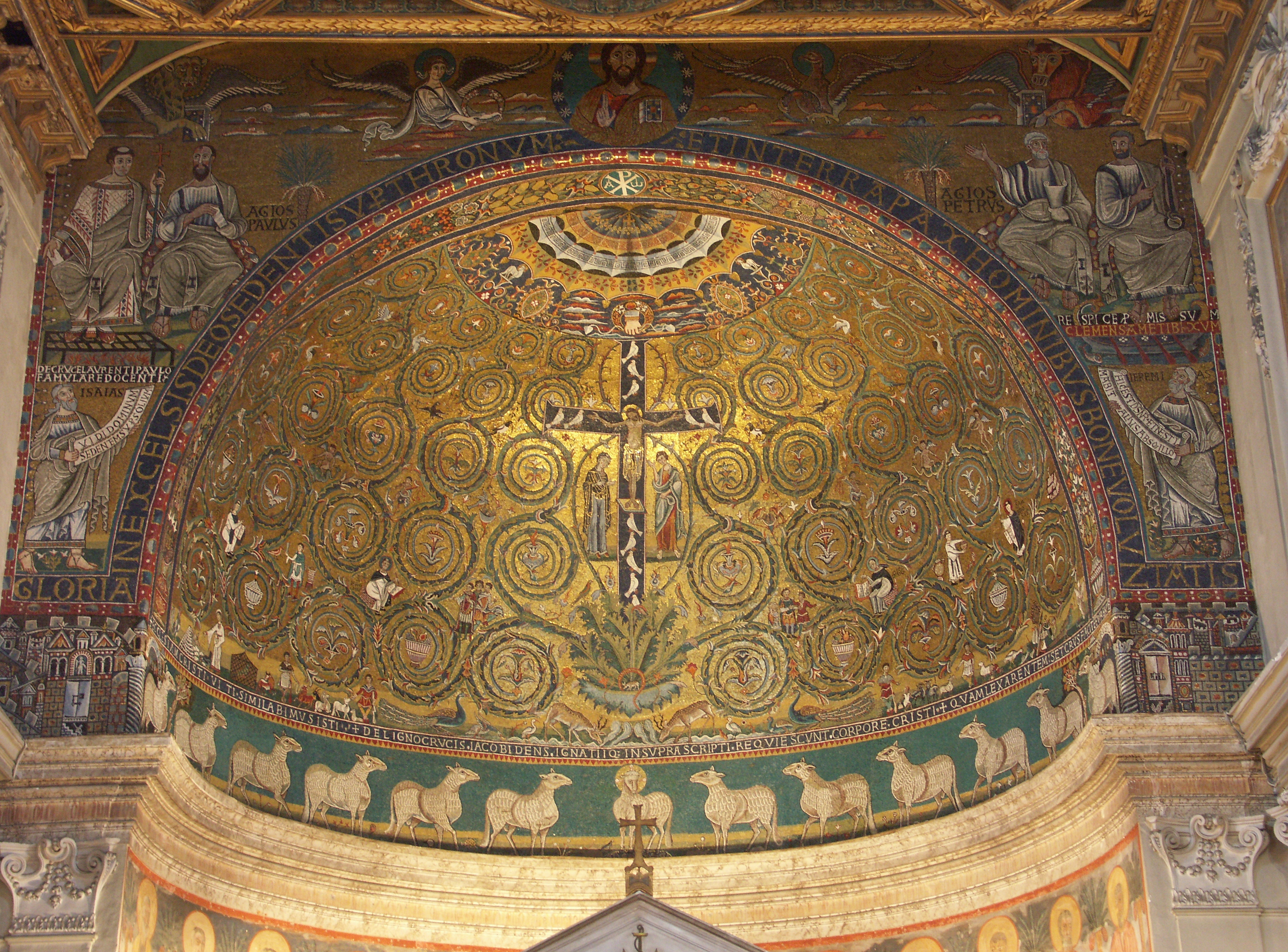
San Clemente, Rome

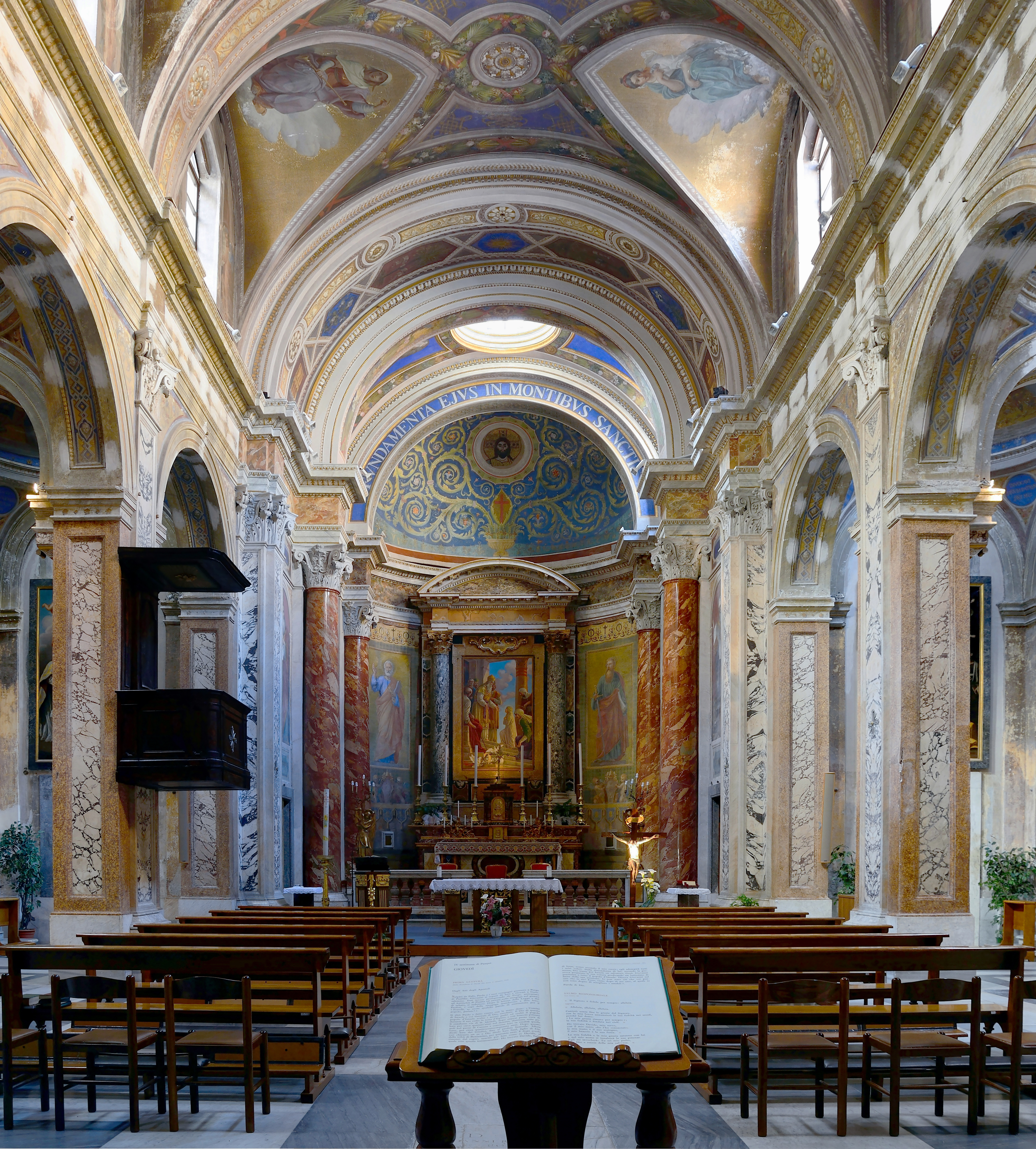
Santa Maria in Monticelli, Rome

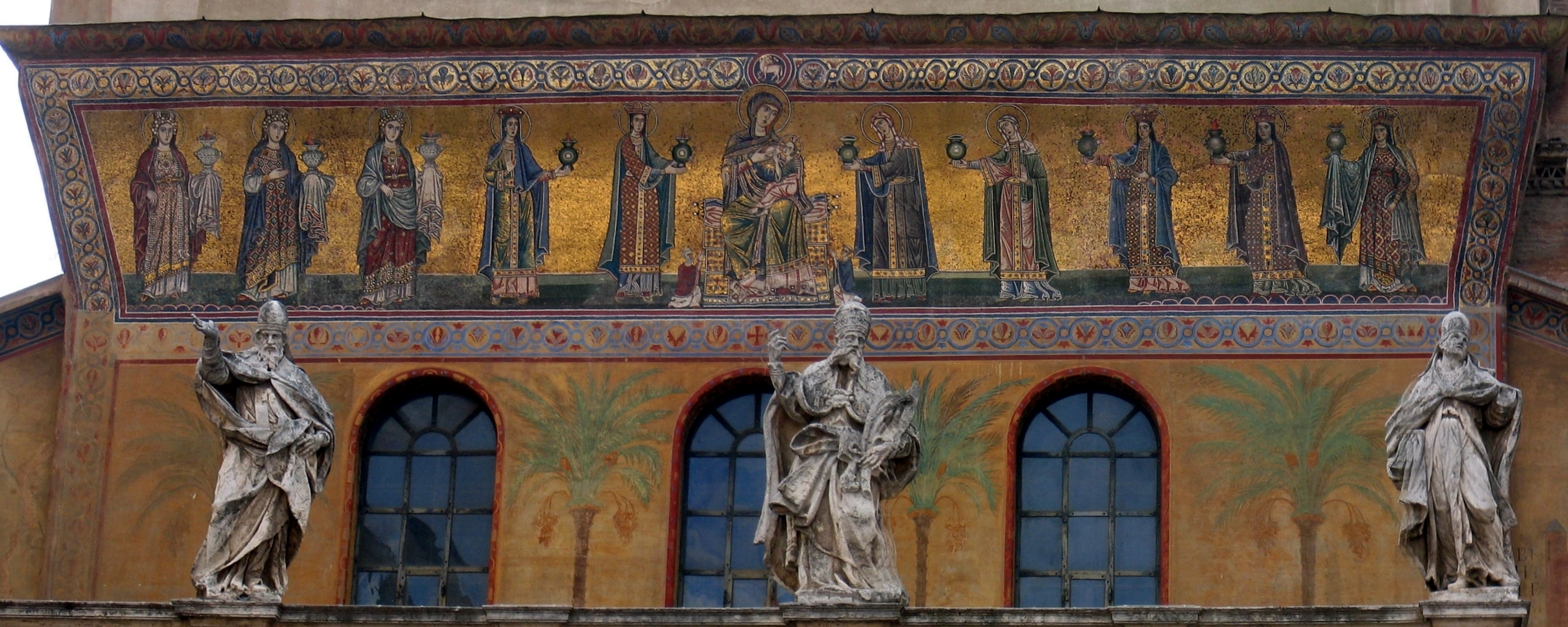
Santa Maria Trastevere - facade

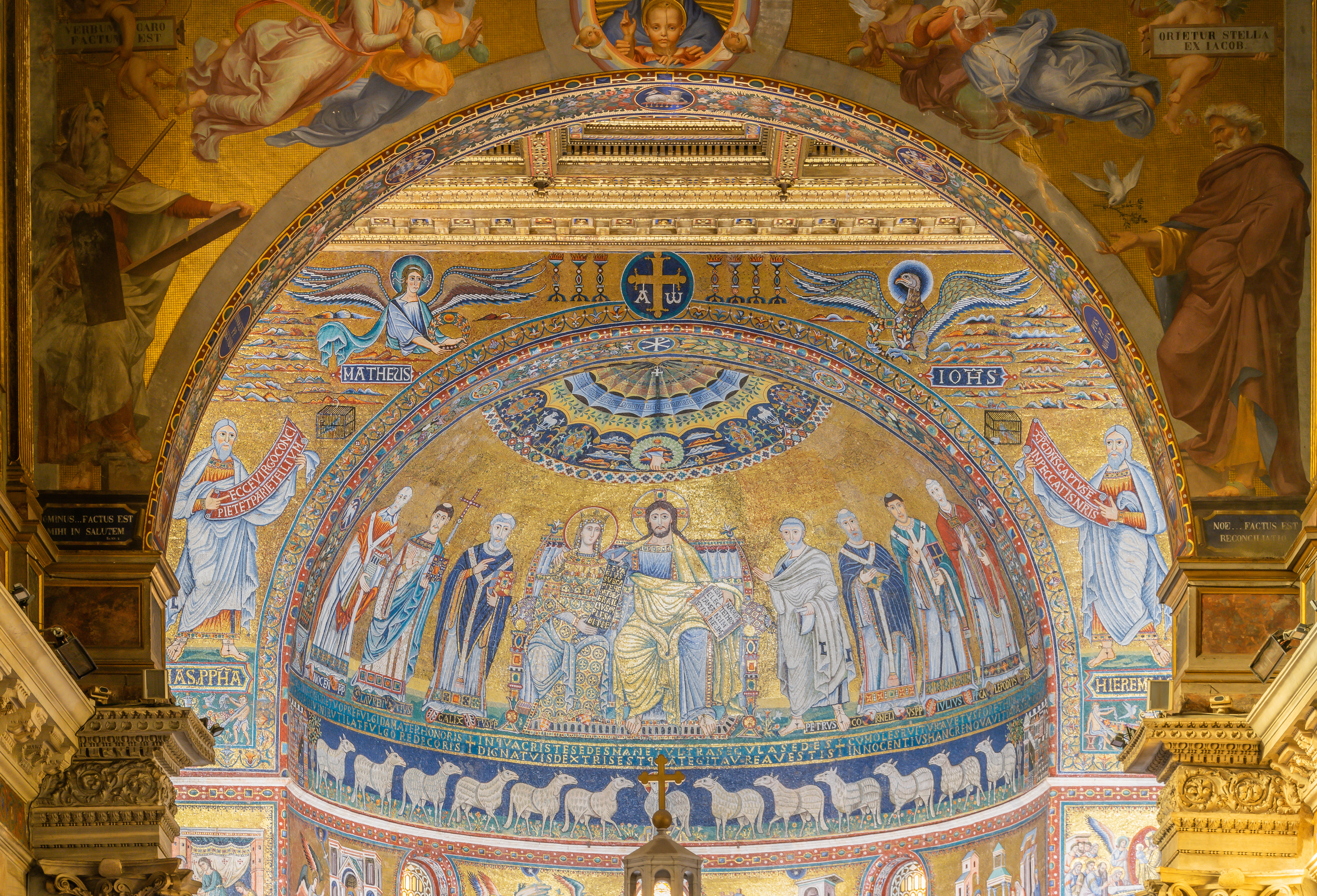
Santa Maria Trastevere - interior

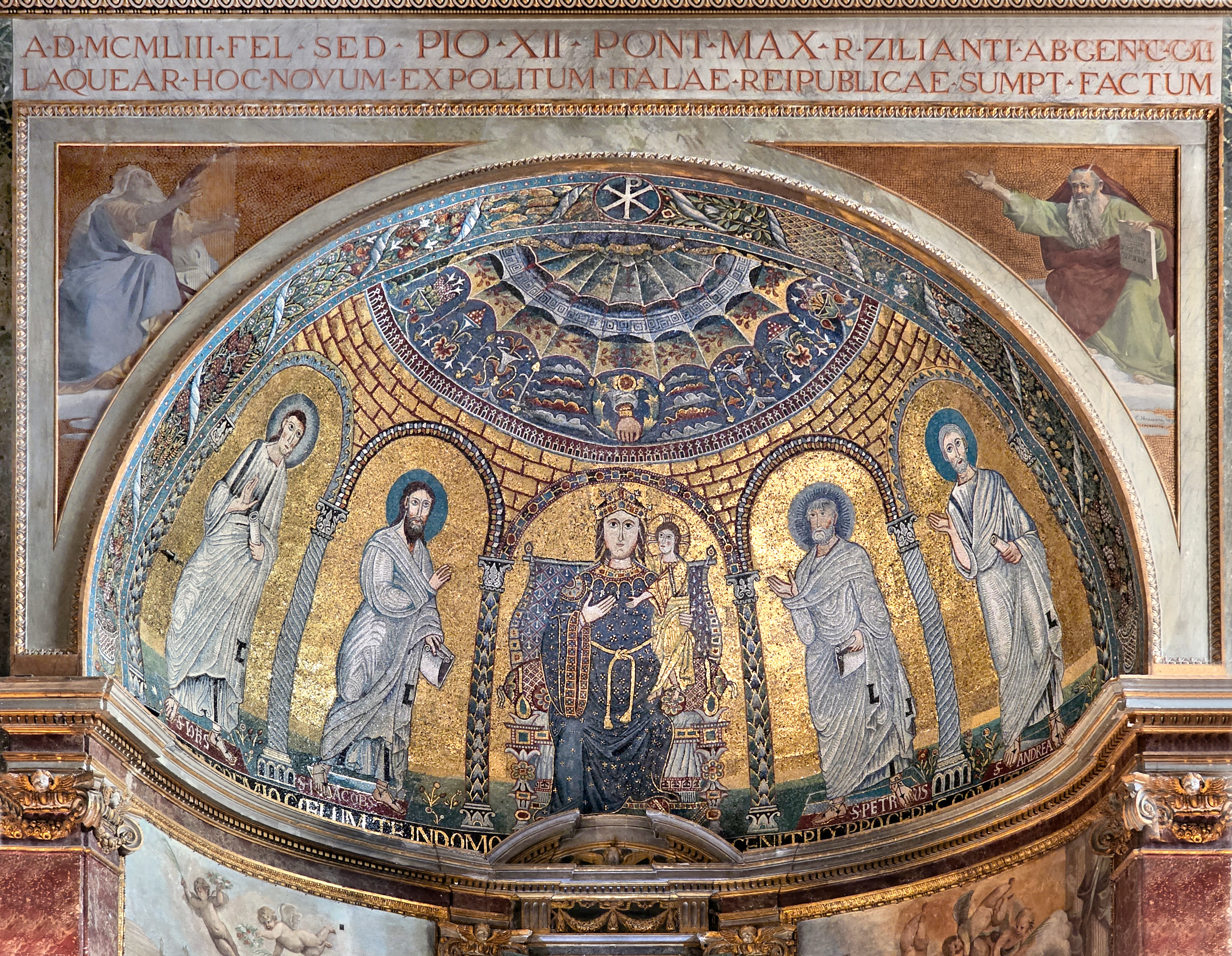
Santa Francesca Romana

==== Sicily ====
See: it:Mosaici bizantini della Sicilia

- Cefalù, Cefalù Cathedral of Santissimo Salvatore
- Monreale, Monreale Cathedral / S. Maria la Nuova — see Monreale Cathedral mosaics
- Palermo, Cappella Palatina in Palazzo dei Normanni (it:Mosaici della Cappella Palatina)
- Palermo, Palazzo dei Normanni — secular mosaics in Sala di re Ruggero
- Palermo, Palermo Cathedral, Palermo (12th–13th) — only fragment of Madonna from Deesis survived (Museo Diocesiano di Palermo)
- Palermo, La Martorana (Santa Maria dell’Ammiraglio)
- Palermo, La Zisa castle (1189) — secular decorative mosaics in Fountain Hall, fragments
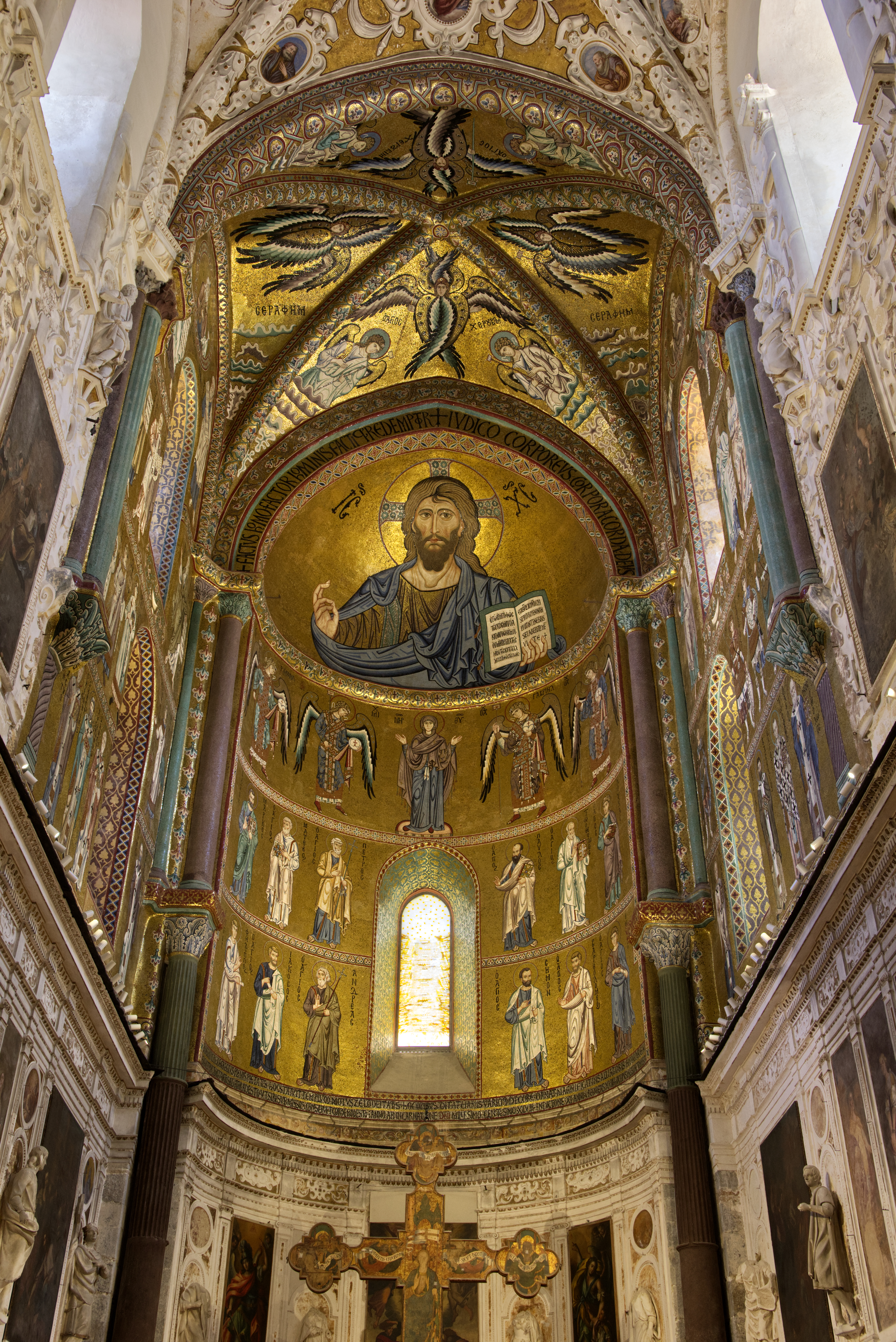
Cefalù

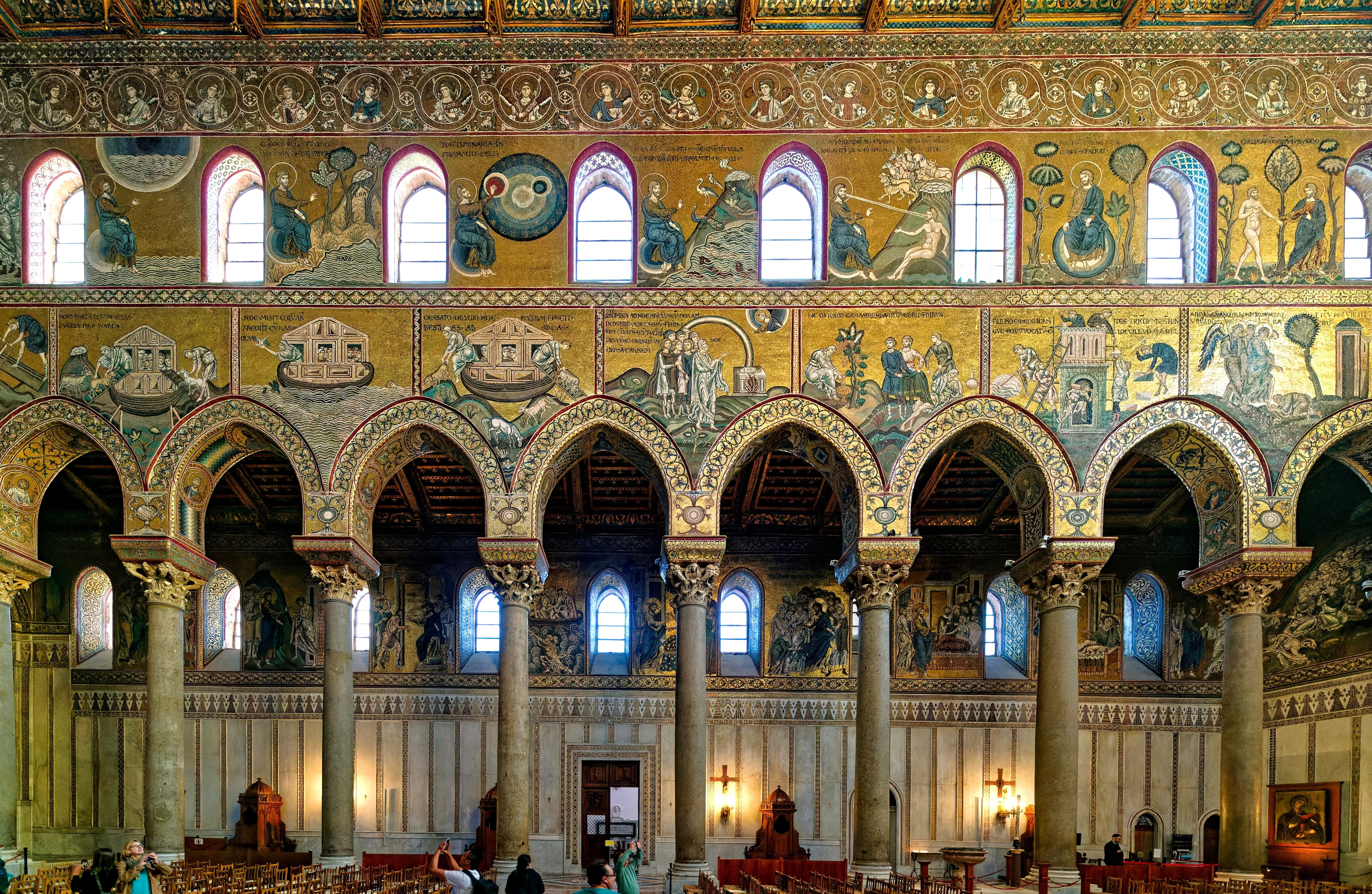
Monreale

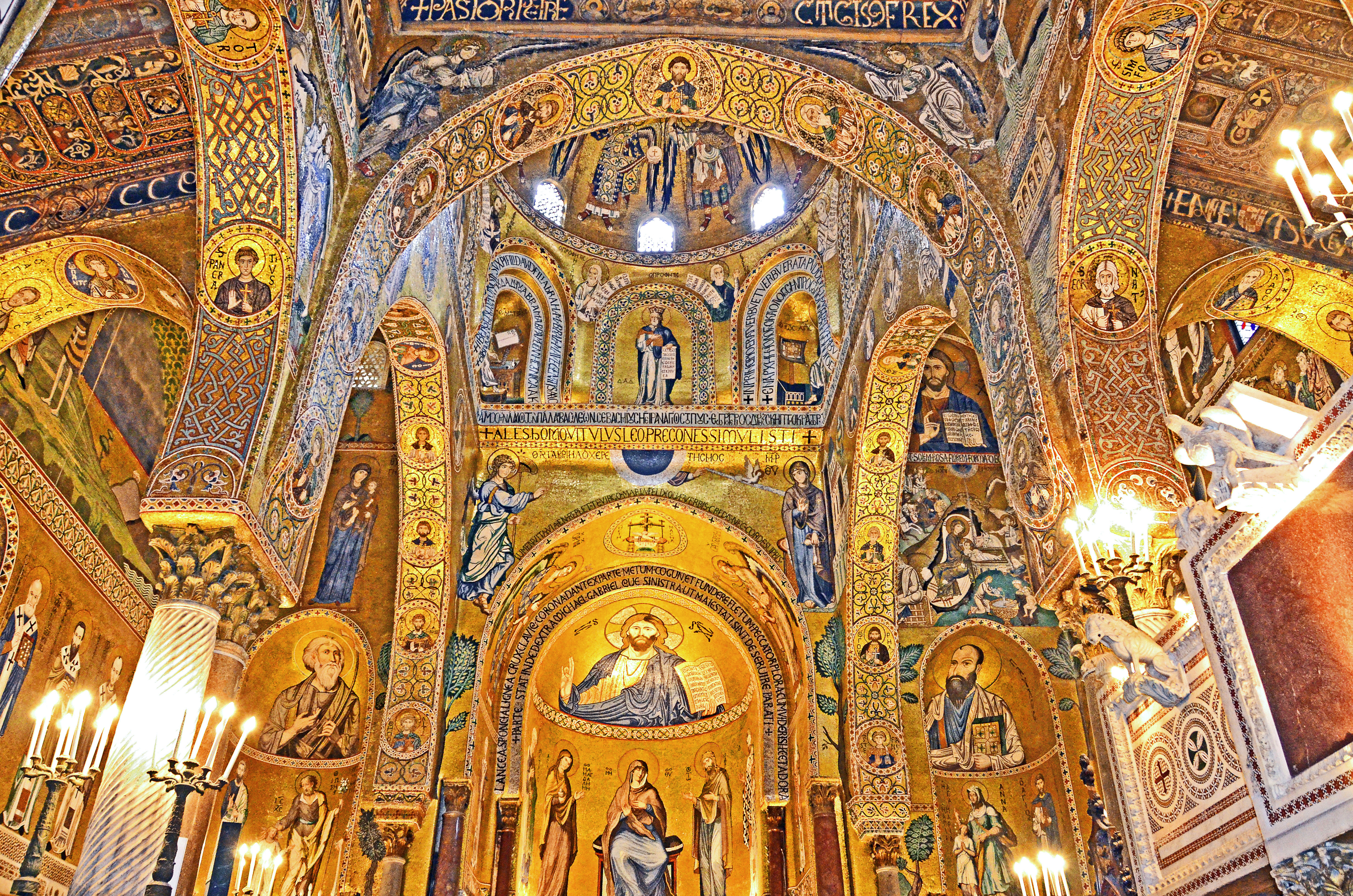
Cappella Palatina

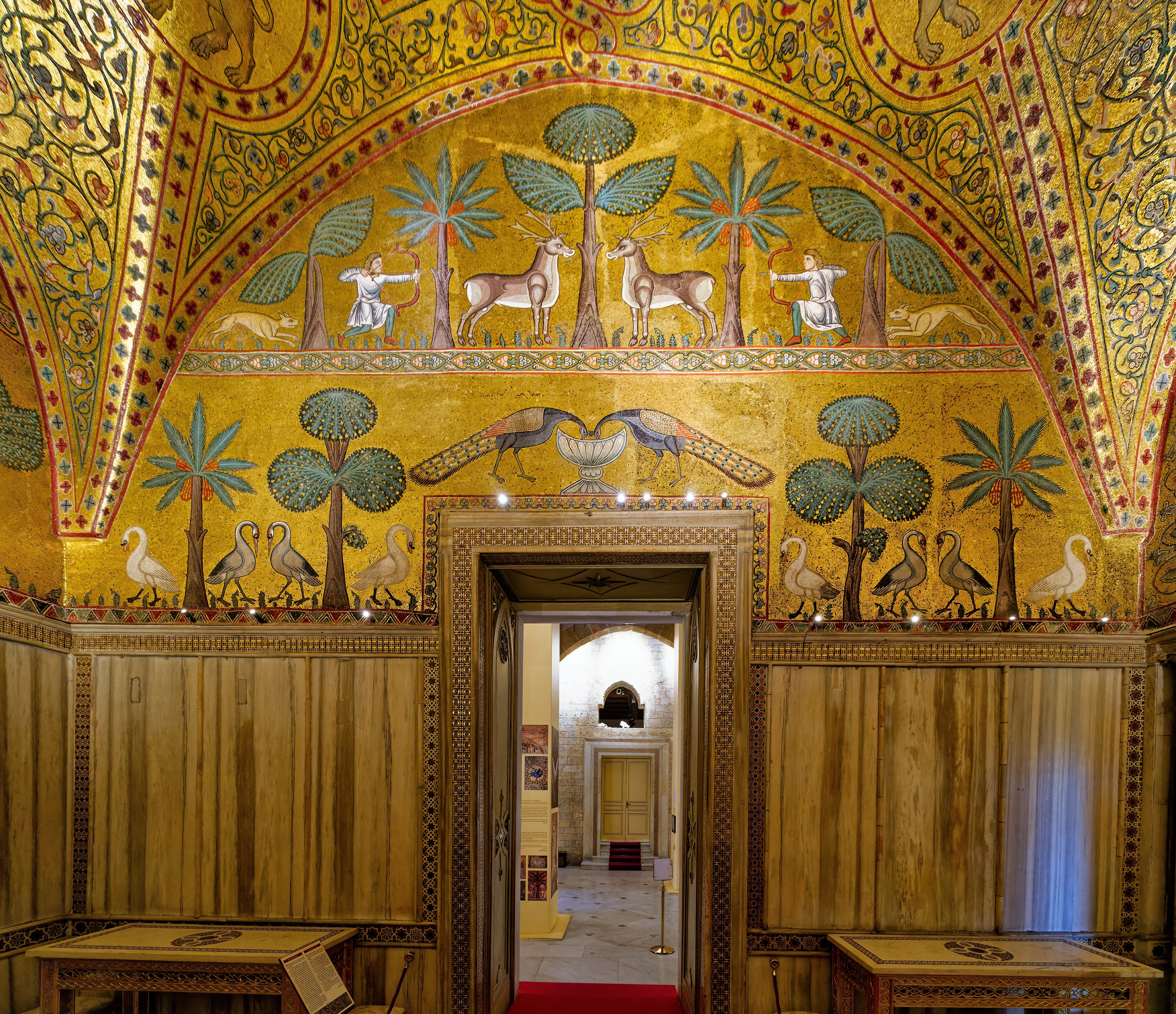
Palazzo dei Normanni

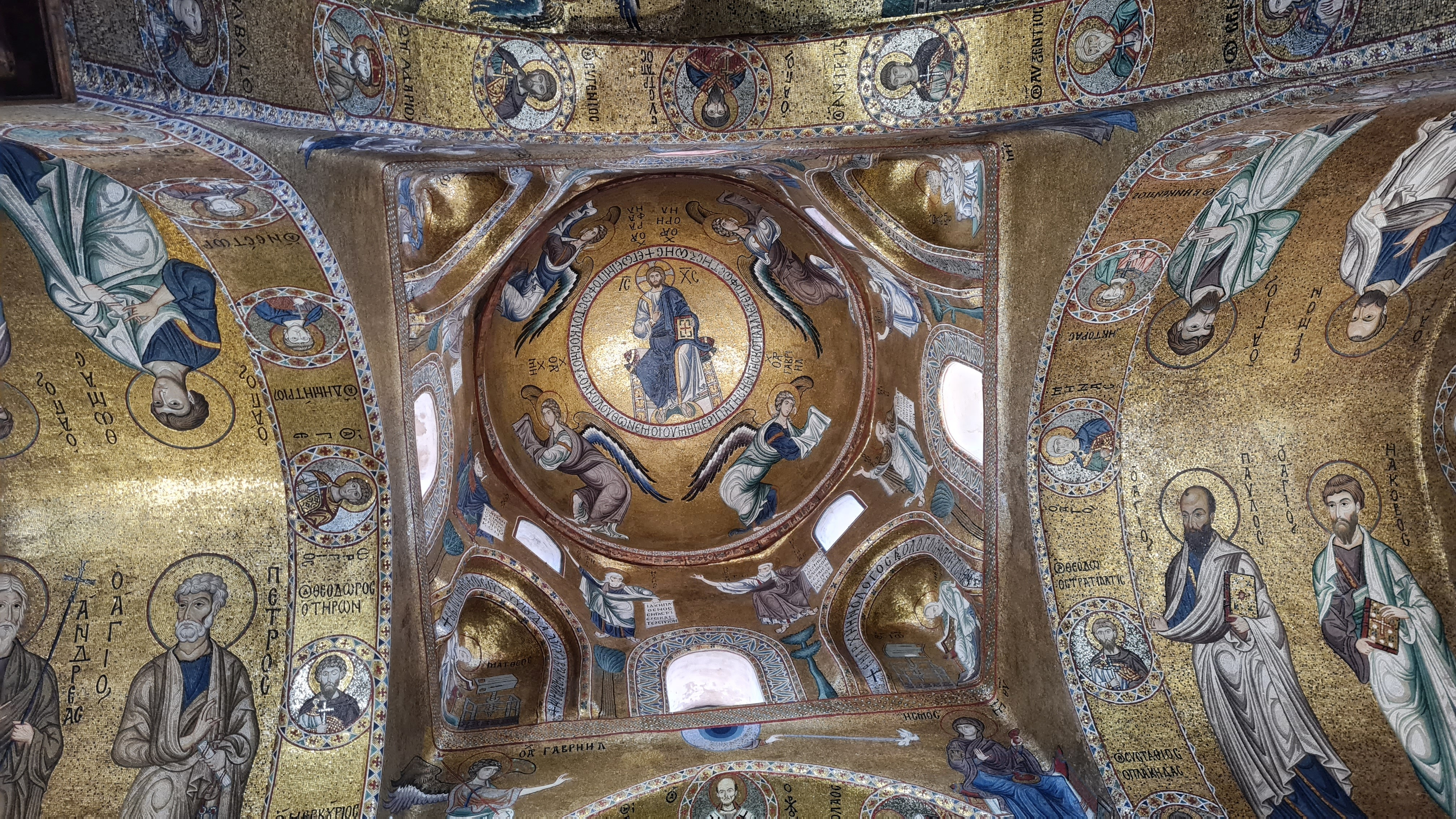
La Martorana

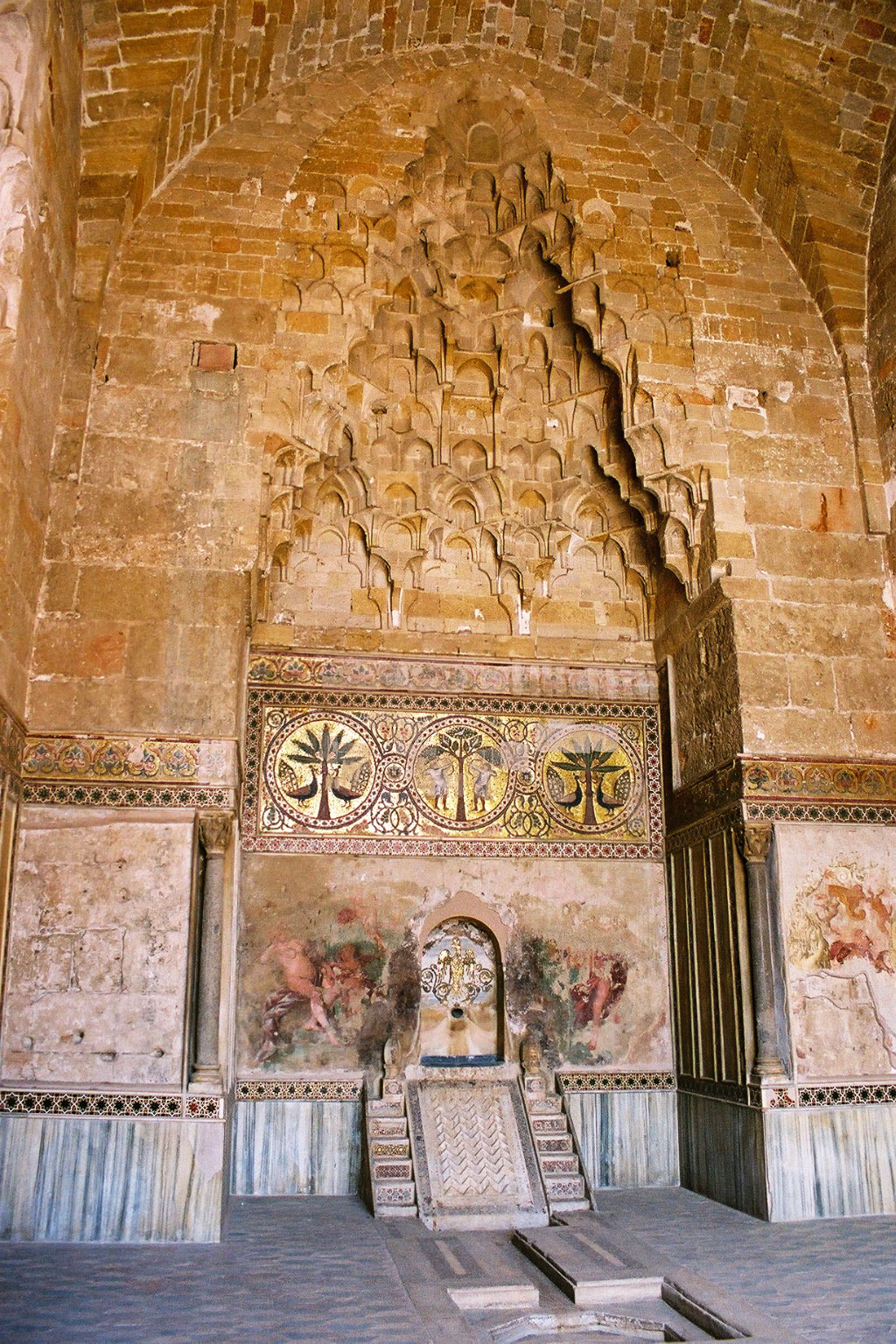
Zisa

=== France ===
- Chartres, Chartres Cathedral — Labyrinth floor
- Ganagobie, Ganagobie Abbey — floor
- Die, fr:Mosaïque des quatre fleuves from chapelle Saint-Nicolas in Die, now in Musée archéologique de Die et du Diois — floor
- Tournus, fr:Abbaye Saint-Philibert de Tournus — floor with Zodiac.
- Valence, Baptistery of Valence, Drôme — floor (possibly 12th century). Now in Musée d’art et d’archéologie de Valence
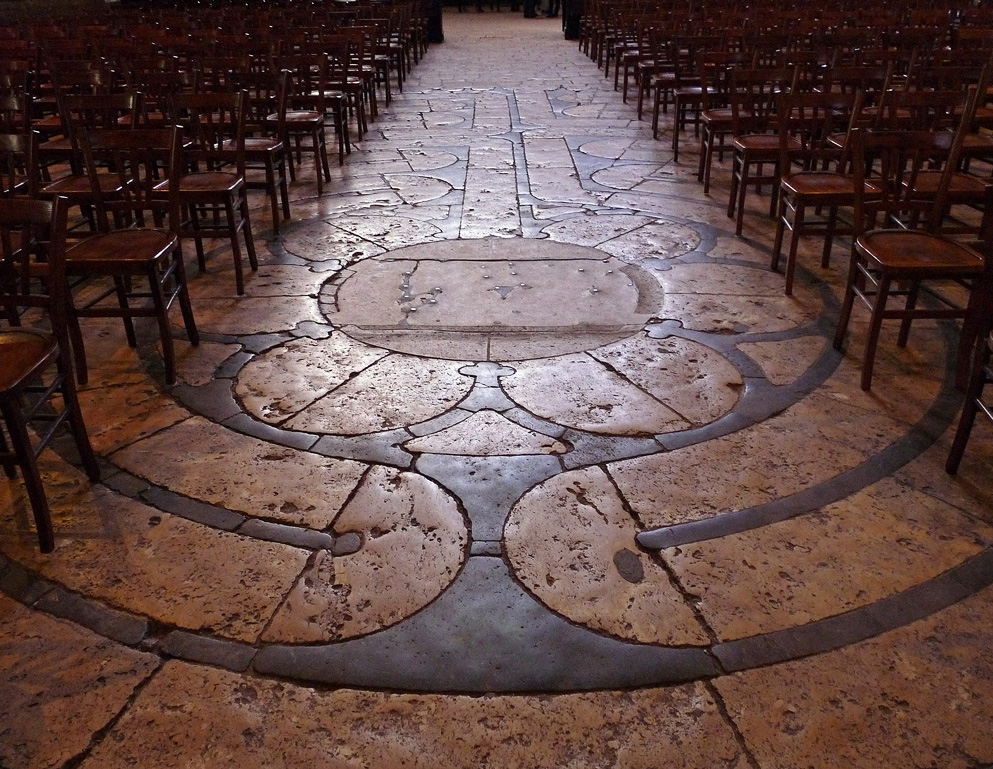
Chartres

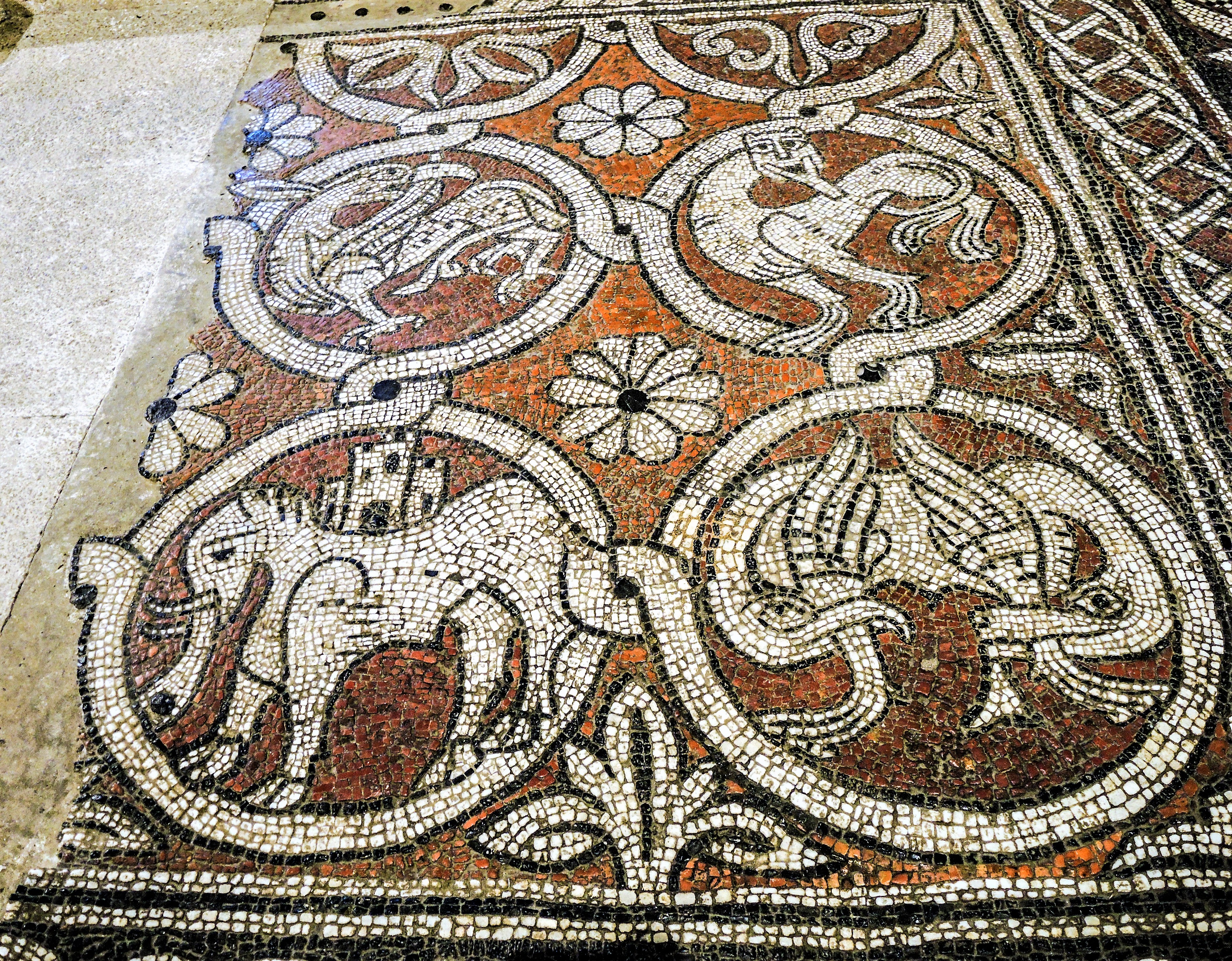
Ganagobie

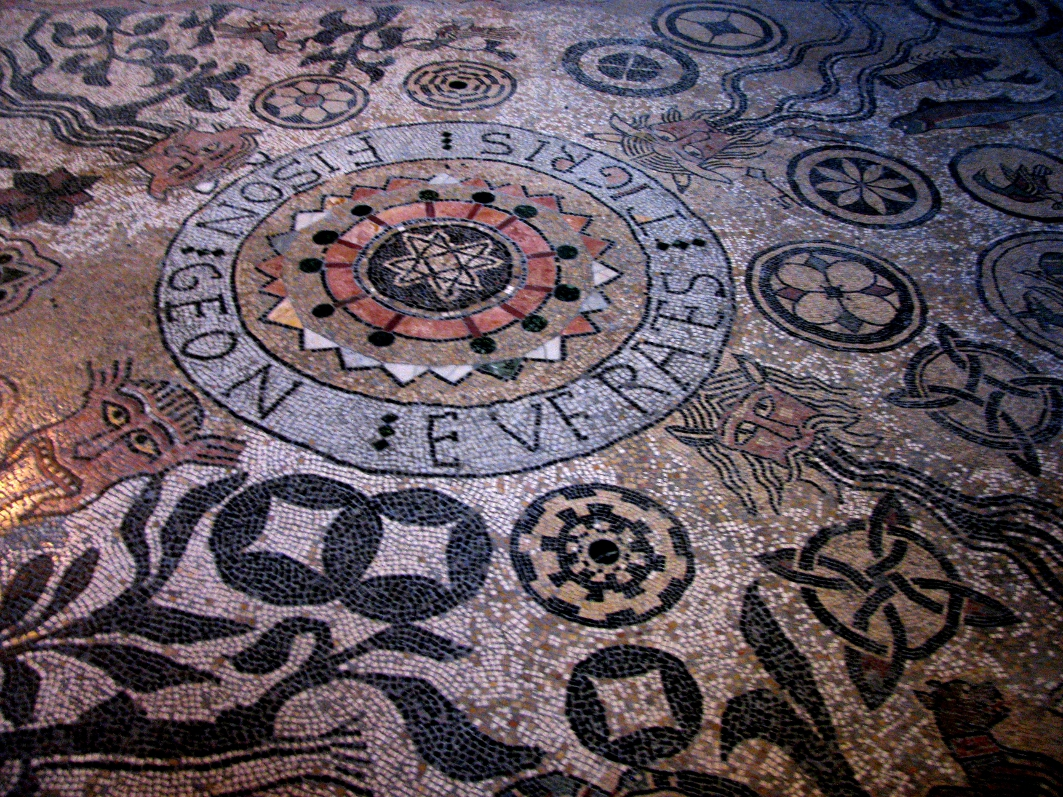
Mosaïque des quatre fleuves

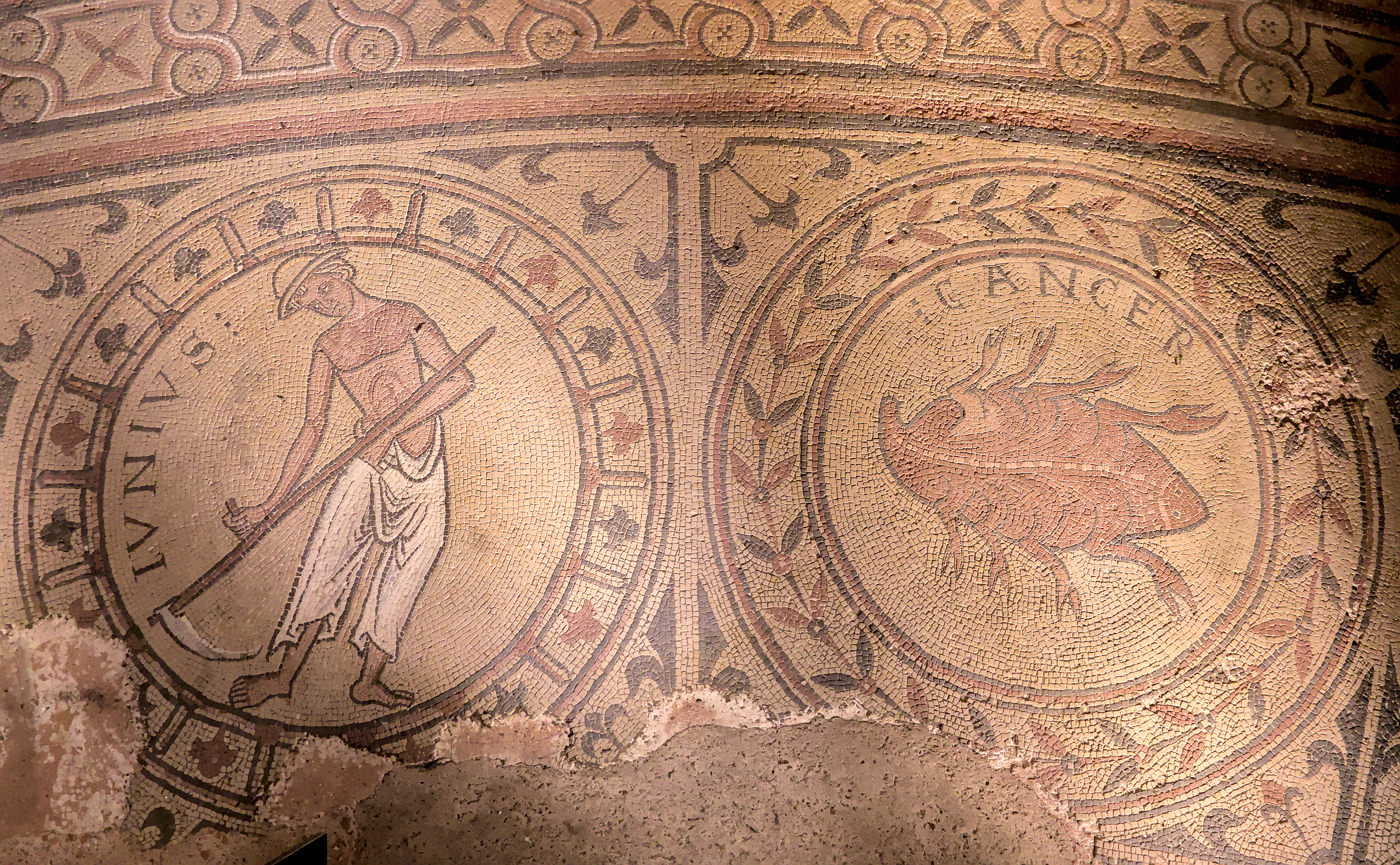
Tournus

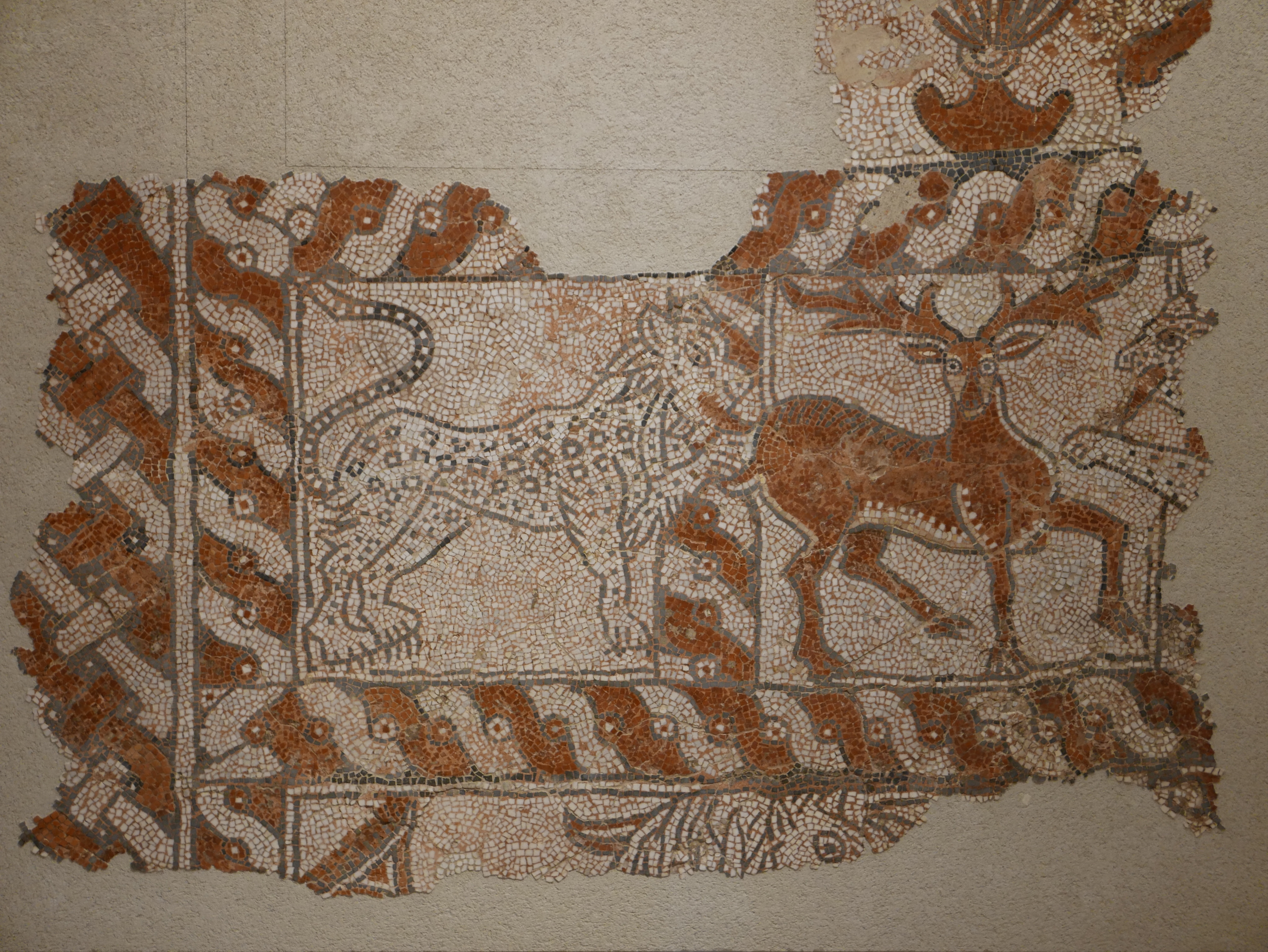
Valence

=== Georgia ===
- Kutaisi, Gelati Monastery
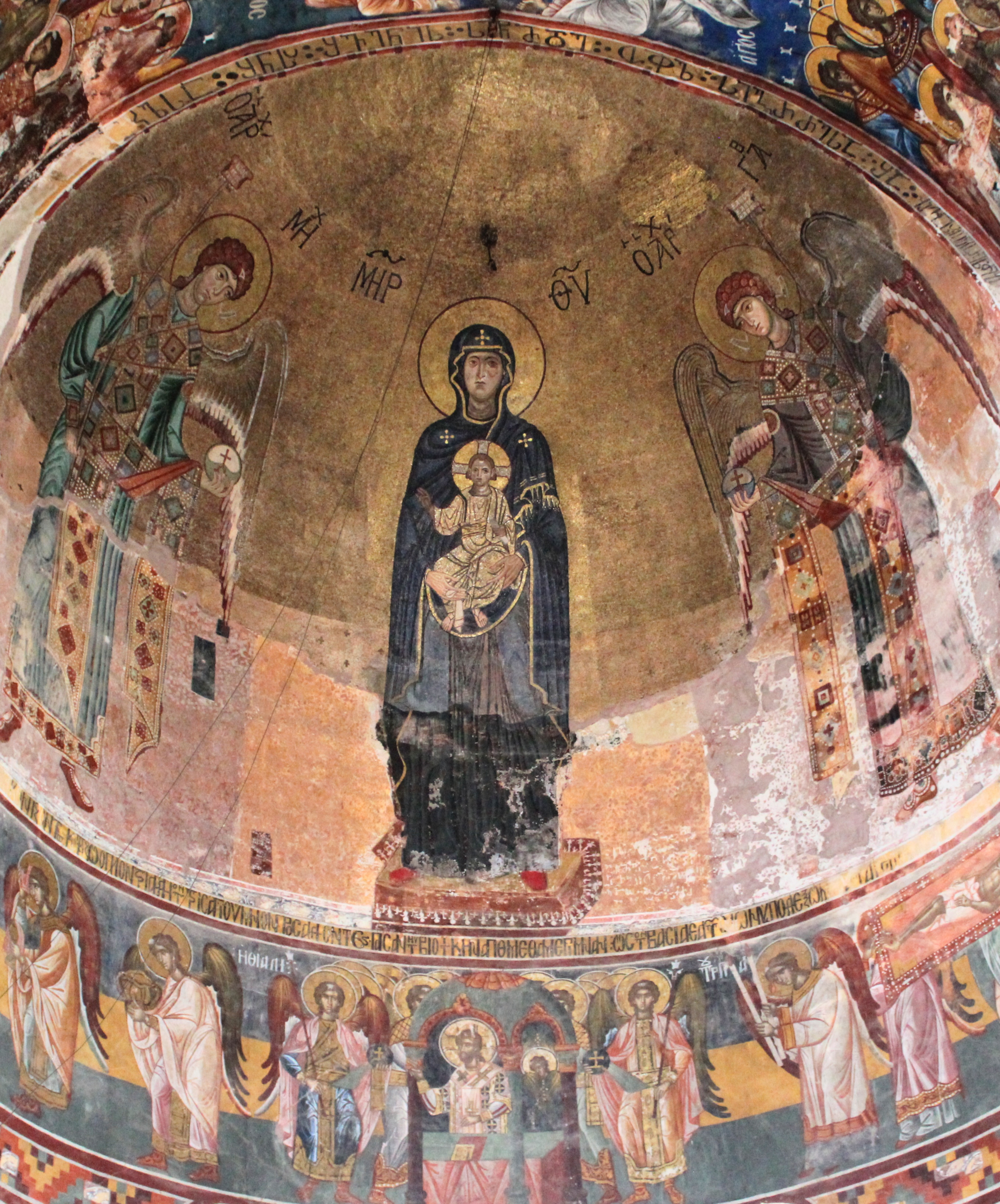

=== Germany, Cologne ===
- St. Gereon’s Basilica, crypt — floor
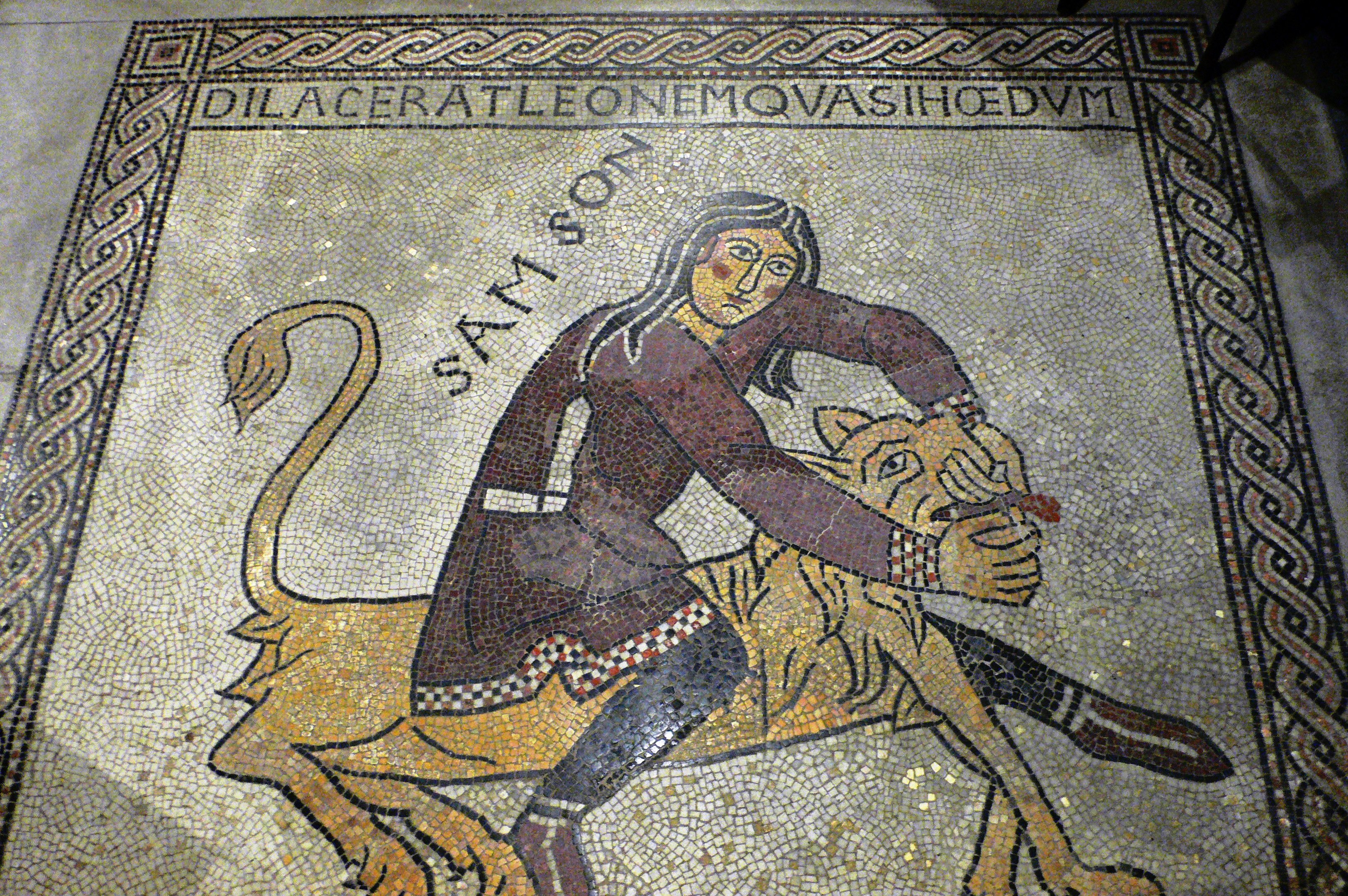

=== Greece ===
- Athens, Church of Theotokos Parthenos / Parthenon — when the Parthenon was converted into the church it was adorned with Christian mosaics and frescoes. Few fragments survive today. Some tesserae exist.
- Mount Athos, Xenophontos Monastery — two portable mosaic icons with Saint George and Saint Demetrius
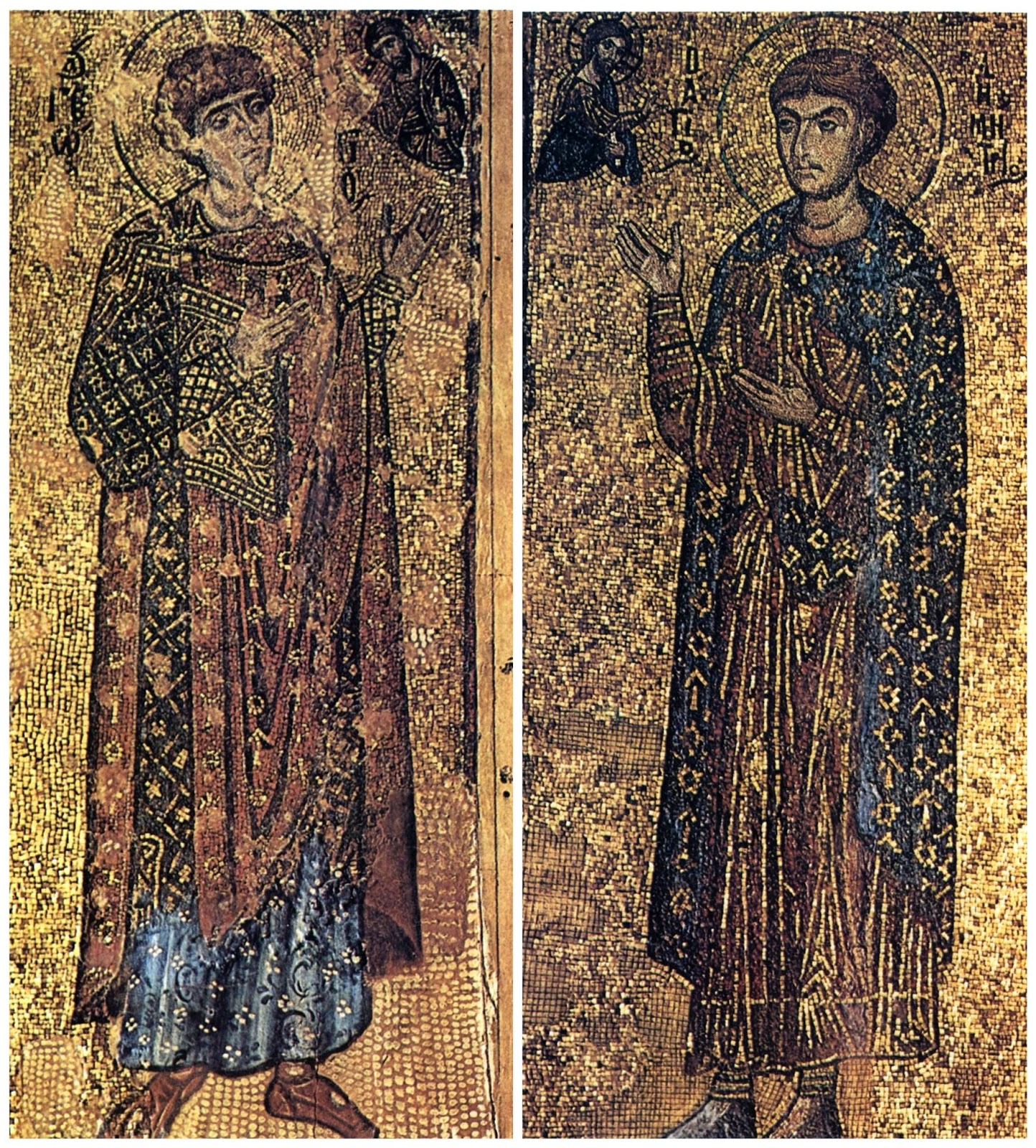
Moni Xenophontos

=== Levant ===
- Bethlehem (Palestine), Church of the Nativity — signatures of masters Basileos and Ephremus. Only signed mosaics in byzantine style.
- Islamic mosaic: Homs (Syria), Great Mosque of al-Nuri — mihrab contains remnants of mosaics in its arch
- Jerusalem (Israel), Church of the Holy Sepulchre — a fragment of the Ascension now survives on the ceiling of the Calvary chapel (at the Eleventh Station), in the Chapel of the Franks at the entrance between it and the Calvary church, some bands of geometric patterns, comparable to decoration in the Dome of the Rock, survive in two niches above sculptural decoration.
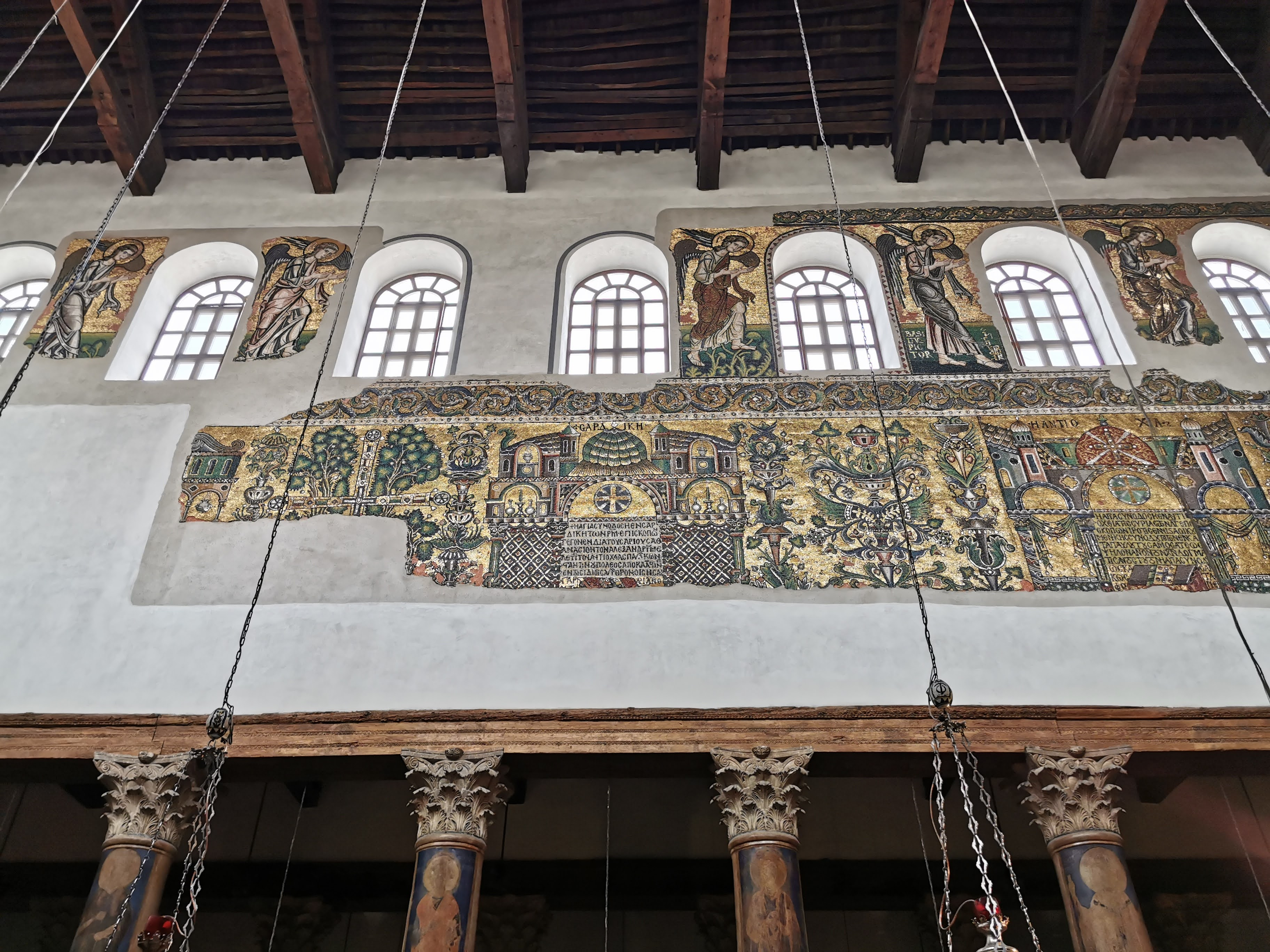
Bethlehem

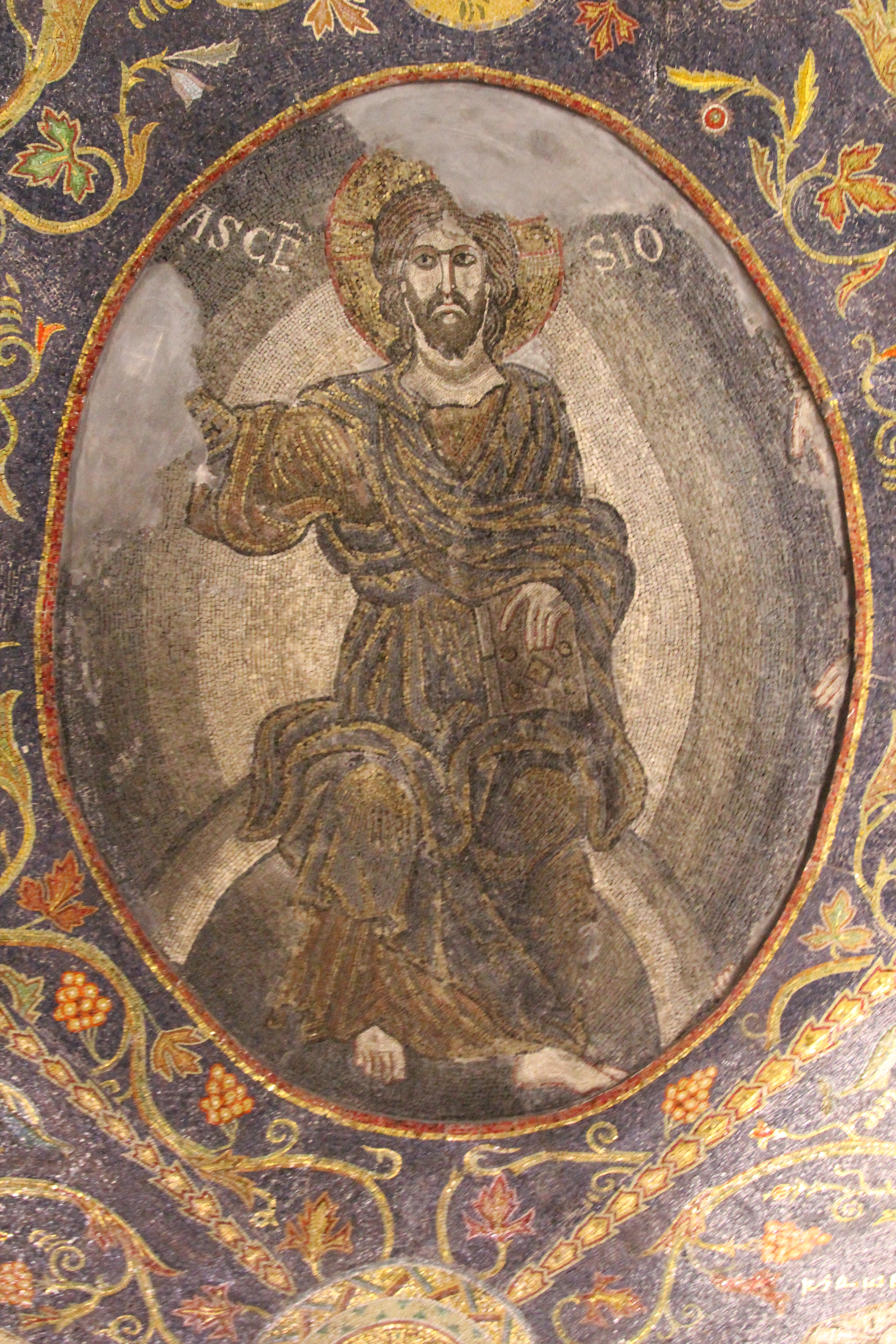
Israel

=== Romania ===
- Bizere (Frumuseni), Bizere Monastery (ro:Mănăstirea Bizere), Frumușeni Mosaics — some archeology was found.
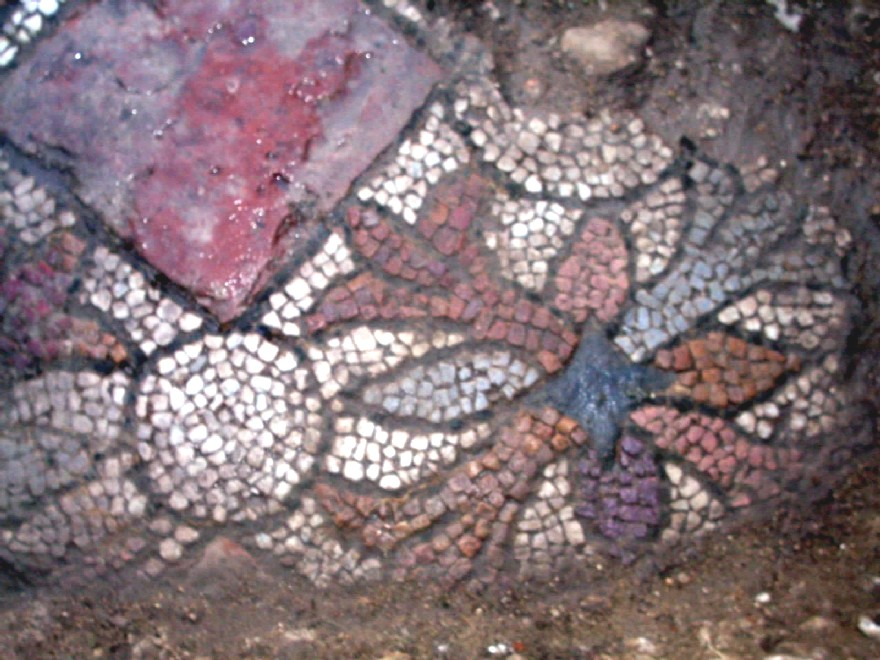

=== Ukraine, Kyiv ===
- Saint Michael Golden Domed Cathedral (about mosaics see: uk:Мозаїки Михайлівського Золотоверхого собору) — destroyed church, fragments in various museums
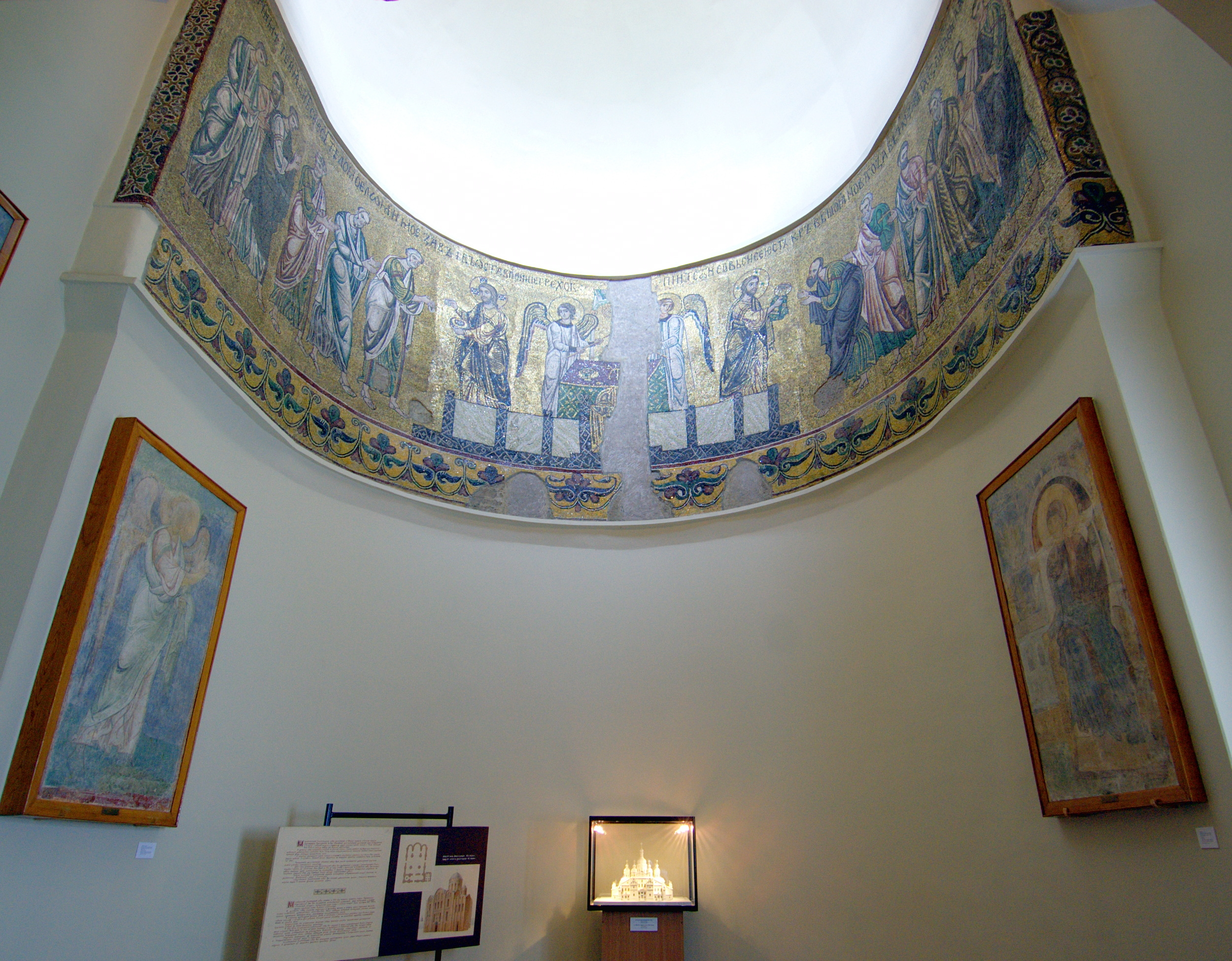

=== Spain ===
- Ripoll (Catalonia), Monastery of Santa Maria de Ripoll — fragment of floor mosaic with ornaments and confronted dolphins. Signature of master ARNALDUS. Only two original fragments remain (one in the Ethnographic Museum of Ripoll and the other in the Rogent private collection in Collbató). The mosaic we see today is the result of a restoration by Elias Rogent in the 19th century. To see the entire Romanesque mosaic, one must refer to the 1888 drawing by Josep Maria Pellicer i Pagès.

=== Turkey, Istanbul ===
- Hagia Sophia — Komnenos mosaics (1118)
- Pantokrator Monastery (Zeyrek Camii) — mosaics representing the apostles and the life of Christ were still visible (although defaced) in the 18th century.
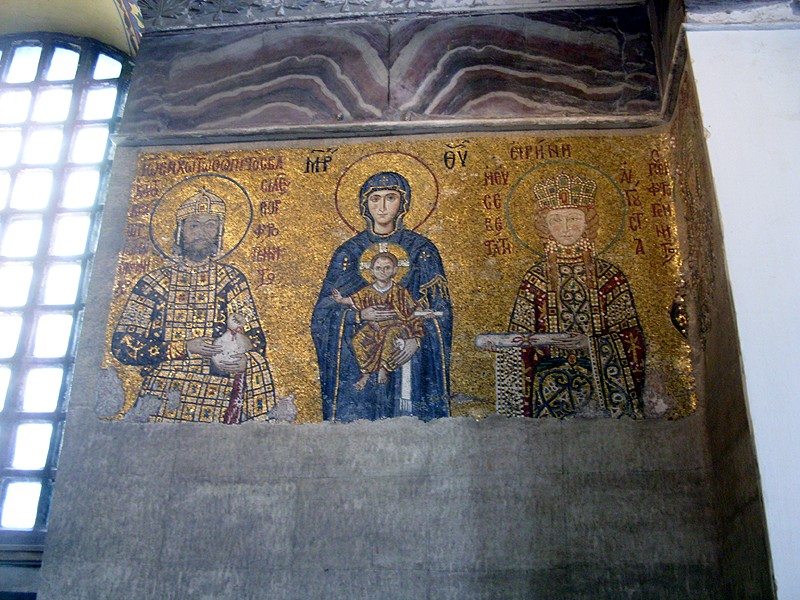
Hagia Sophia, Komnenos mosaics

== 13th century ==
=== Egypt, Cairo ===
- Mausoleum of Shajar al-Durr — in mihrab
- Mosque of Ibn Tulun — in mihrab wide band of glass mosaic containing an inscription of the Shahada in Naskhi script
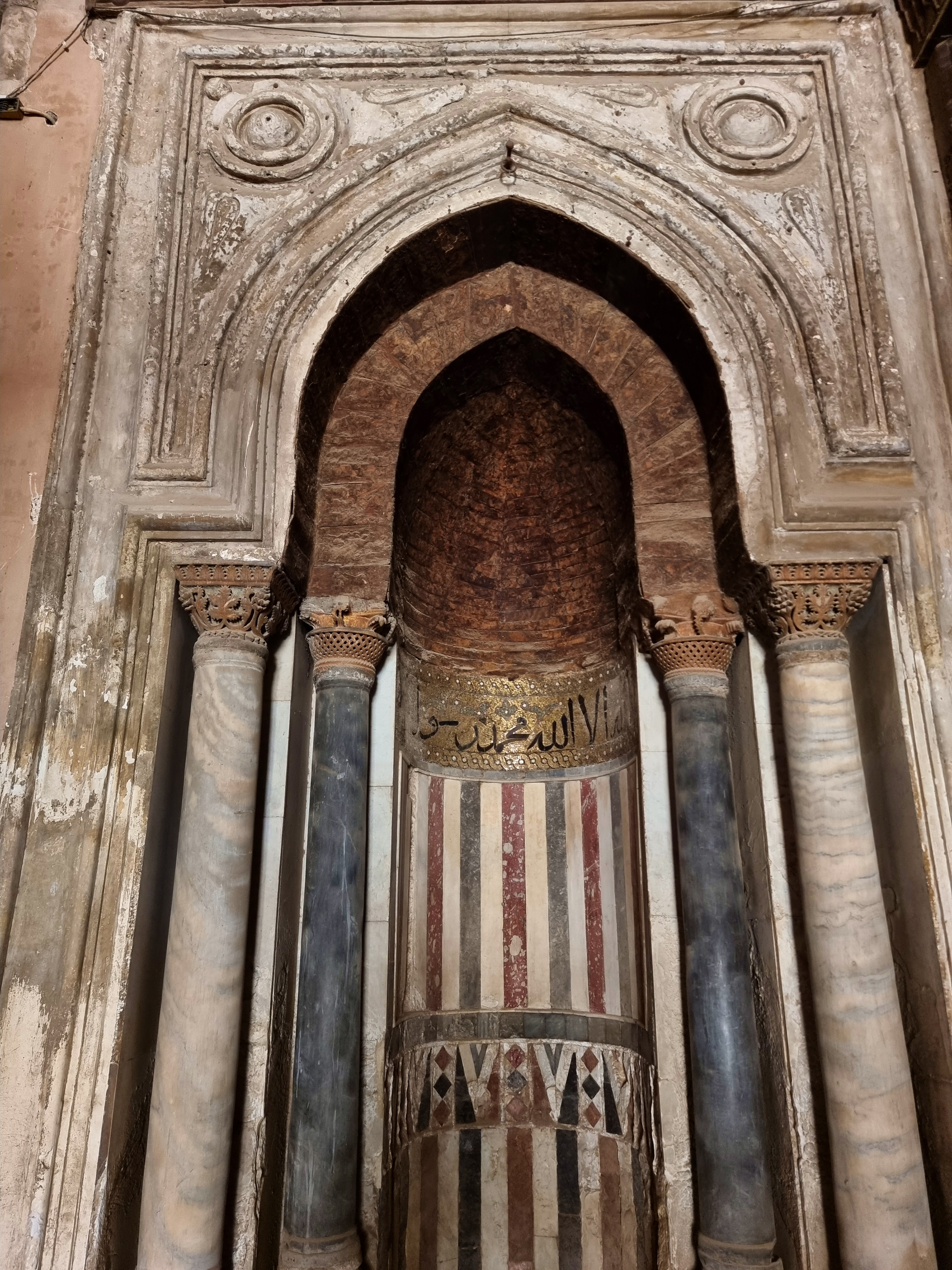
Mosque of Ibn Tulun

=== England, London ===
- Westminster Abbey — Great Pavement (1268), had a signagure of Oderic
- Westminster Abbey — Shrine of Edward the Confessor — signature of Petrus Romanus (Pietro di Oderisio)
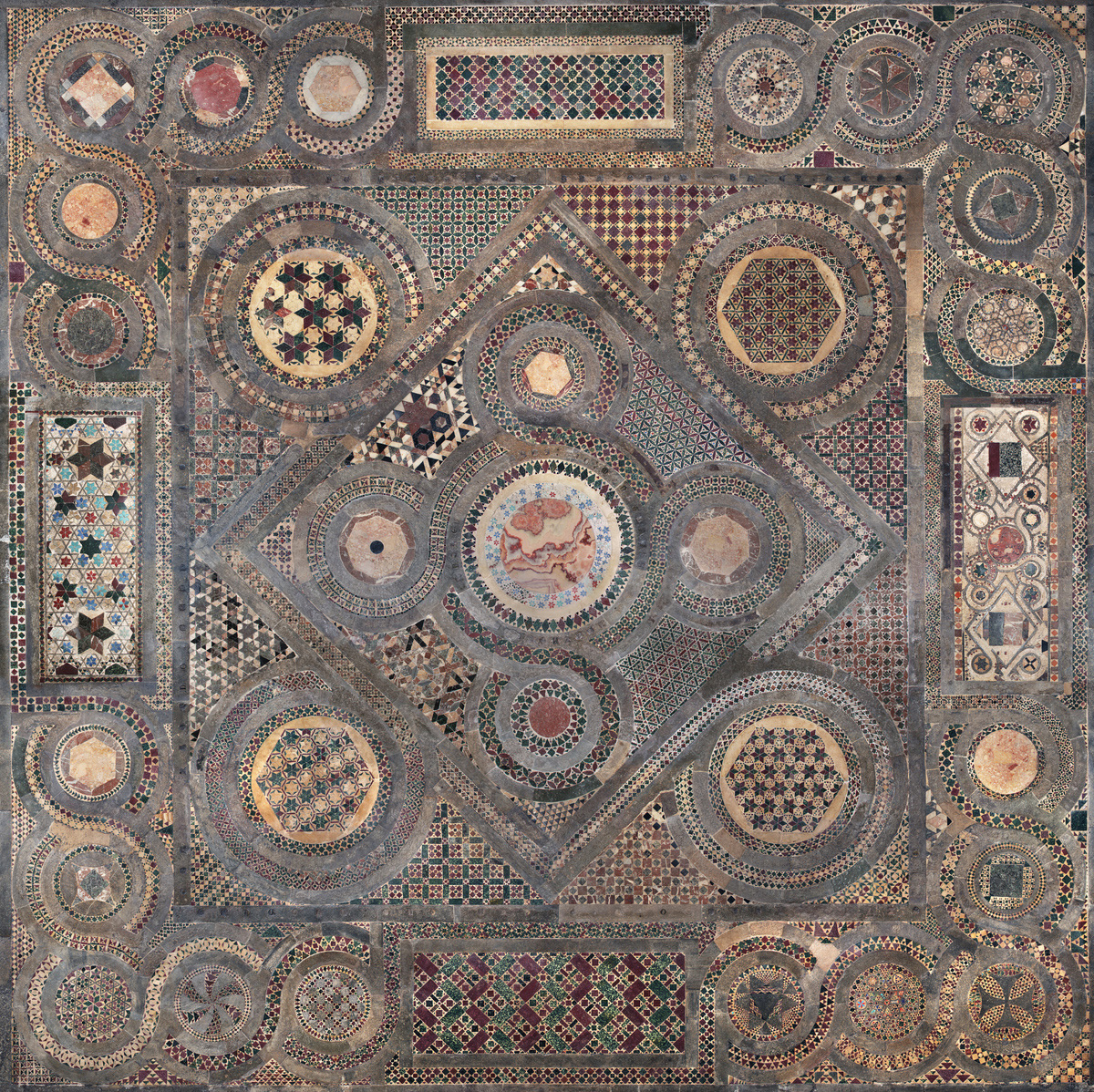

=== Italy ===
- Anagni, Anagni Cathedral — pavement (1231), mosaic column near ciborium by Vassalletto
- Aosta, Aosta Cathedral — mosaics in choir, with Zodiac and chymeras.
- Bobbio, Bobbio Abbey — floor with the histories of the Maccabeans and the Cycle of the Months.
- Genoa, Church of San Matteo — facade mosaic
- Grottaferrata, Church of Santa Maria in the Territorial Abbacy of Saint Mary of Grottaferrata — Deesis with donor
- Lucca, Basilica of San Frediano — facade mosaic by Berlinghiero Berlinghieri
- Messina (Sicily), Santa Maria della Scala (it) — built in 1347, destroyed in 1908, had «Madonna» mosaic
- Messina (Sicily), Santa Maria della Valle / Santa Maria fuori le mure (it) — demolished, fragments in Museo regionale (Messina).
- Milan, Basilica of Sant'Ambrogio — apse mosaic. The central Christ Pantokrator scene was created in the early 13th century, while the flanking saints (Gervasius and Protasius) and biblical scenes on the sides date back to the Carolingian period (9th century)
- Monreale (Sicily), Monreale Cathedral / Santa Maria la Nuova (13th–14th) — nave mosaic with Biblical themes
- Murano, Venice, Church of San Cipriano (it — church demolished, apse mosaic was sold in Friedenskirche (Potsdam, Germany)
- Palermo (Sicily), Cathedral of Palermo — mosaic of Madonna and Child in the porch of facade
- Ravenna, San Giovanni Evangelista (1213) — floor mosaics fragments
- Salerno, Salerno Cathedral / San Matteo — facade mosaic
- Spoleto, Church of Santa Maria Assunta (1207) — mosaic by Solsternus on the facade, with signature (1st Italian mosaicist’s signature)
- Venice, Basilica di San Marco — main facade mosaic of 1st gate; barrel vaults, south transept, north transept, right aisle, some cupolas,
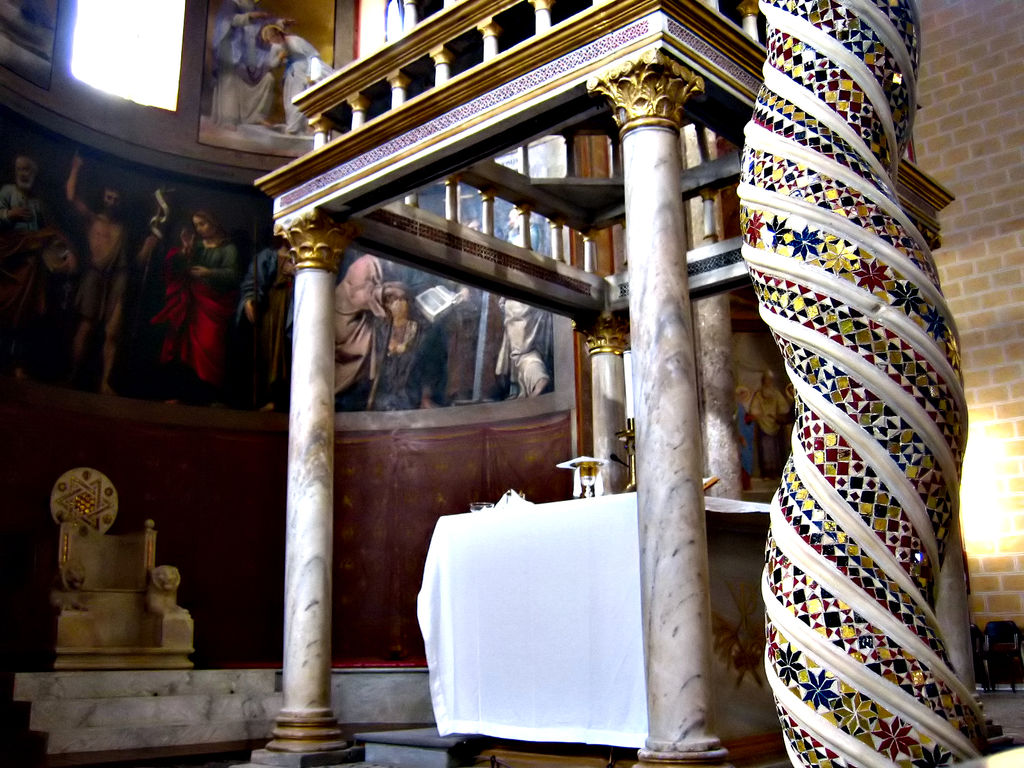
Anagni column

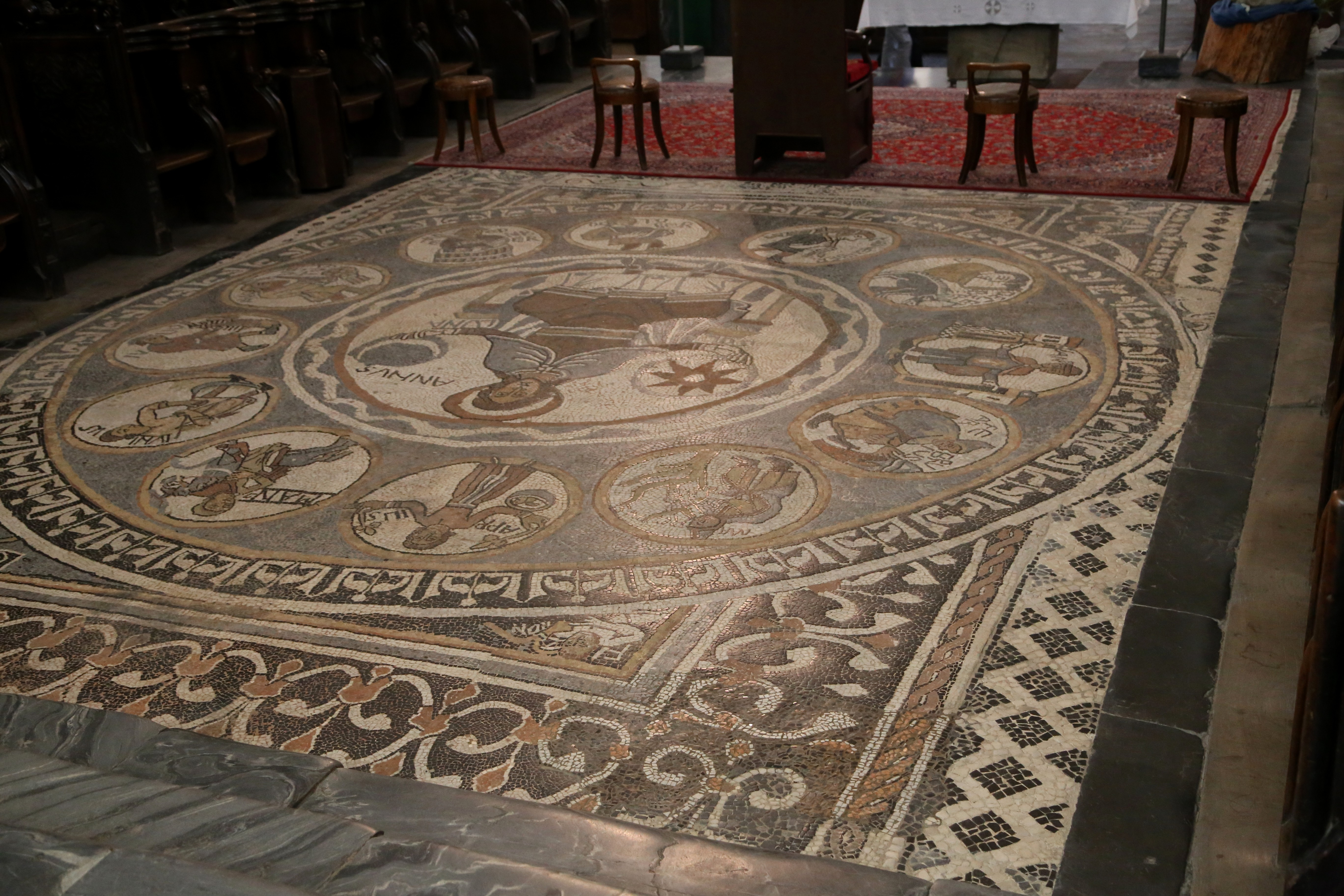
Aosta

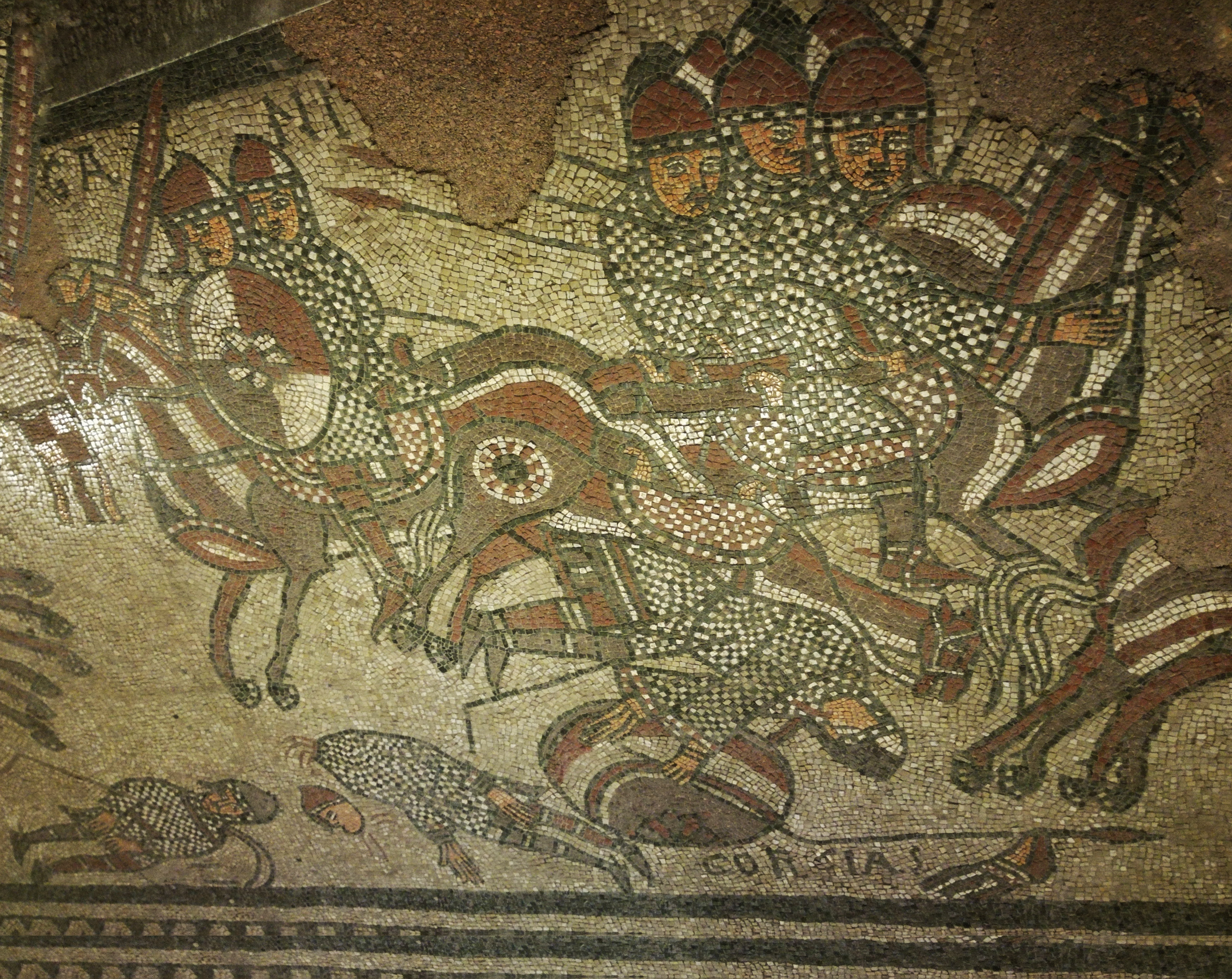
Bobbio Abbey

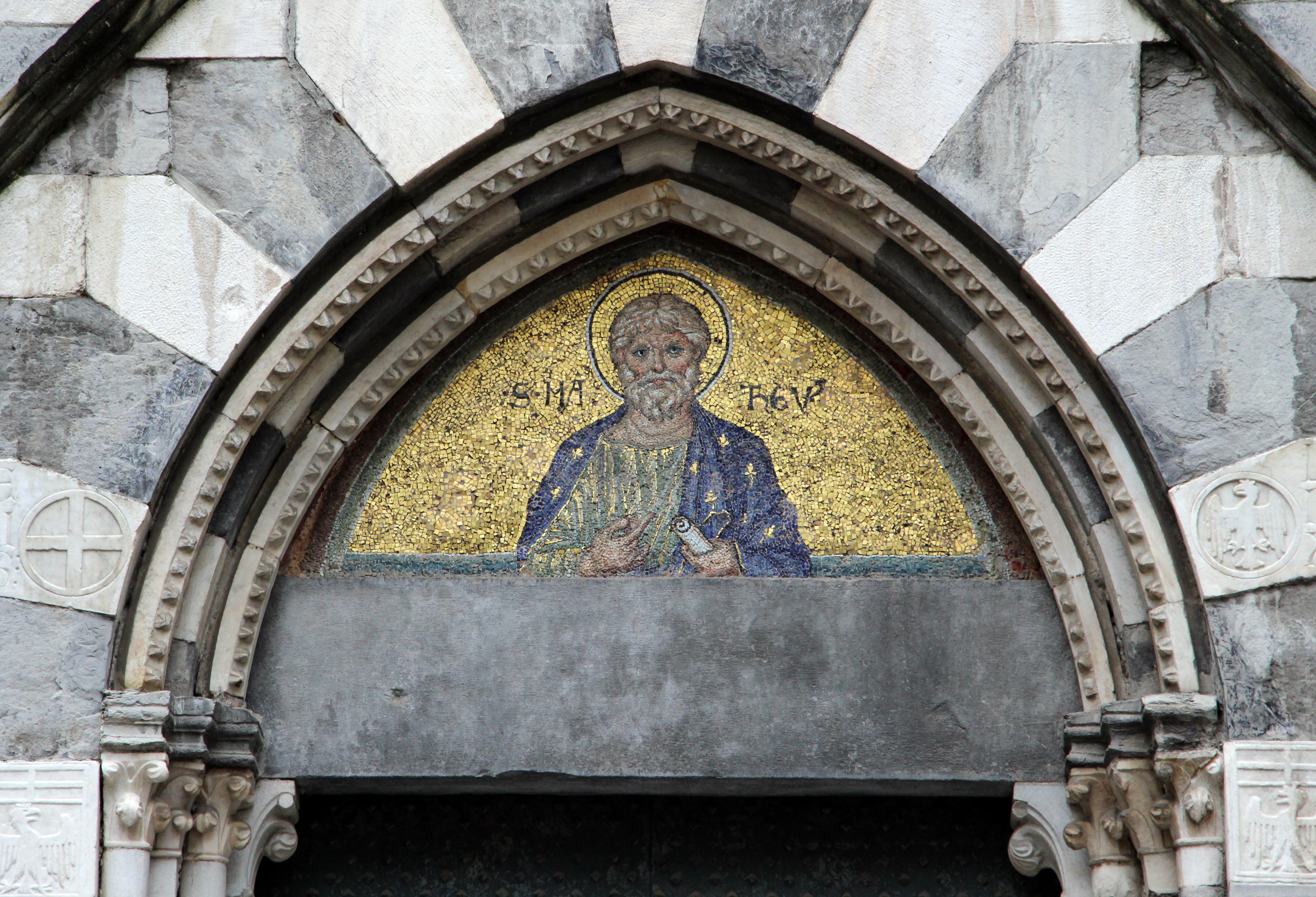
San Matteo (Genoa)

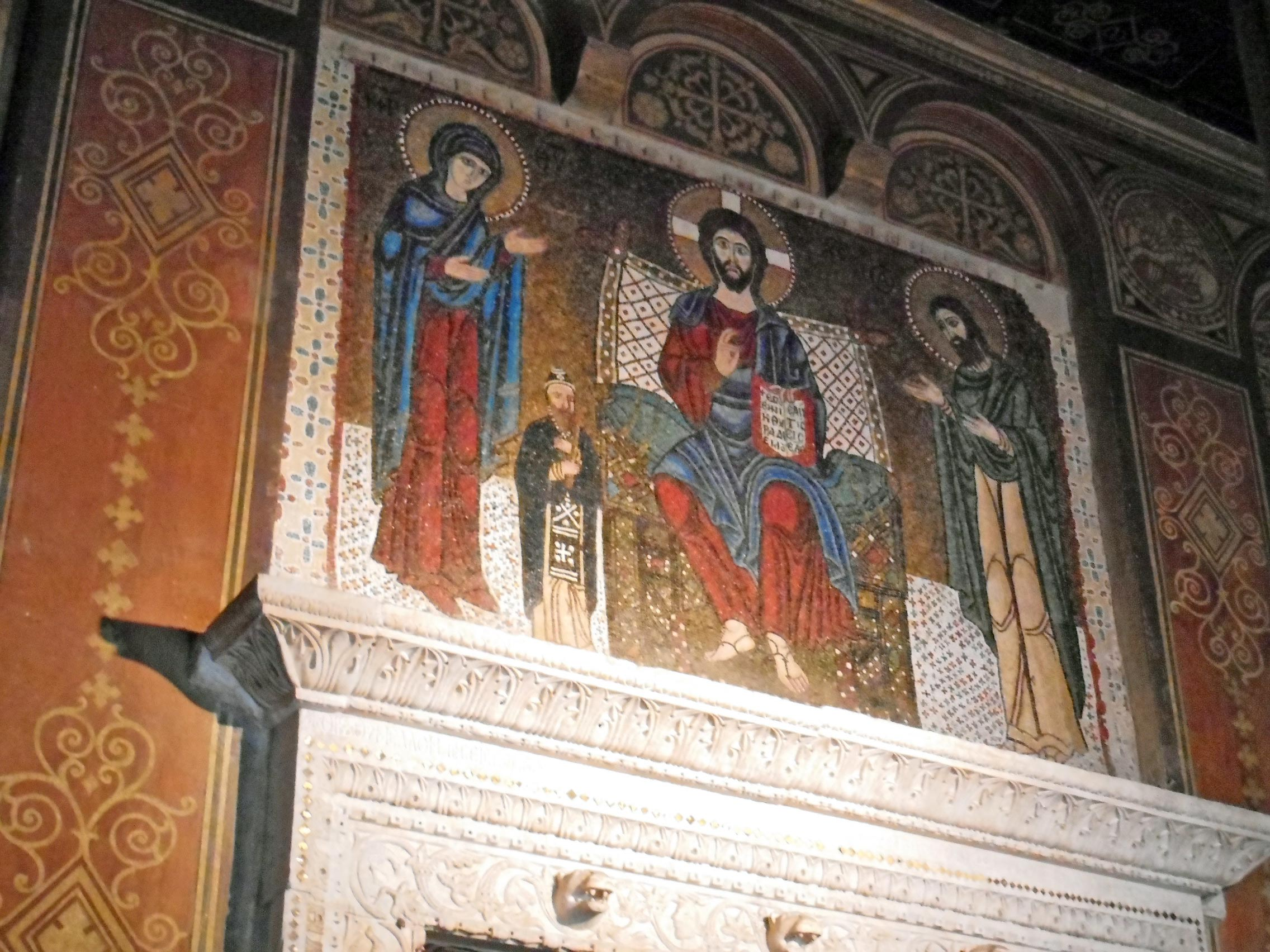
Grottaferrata

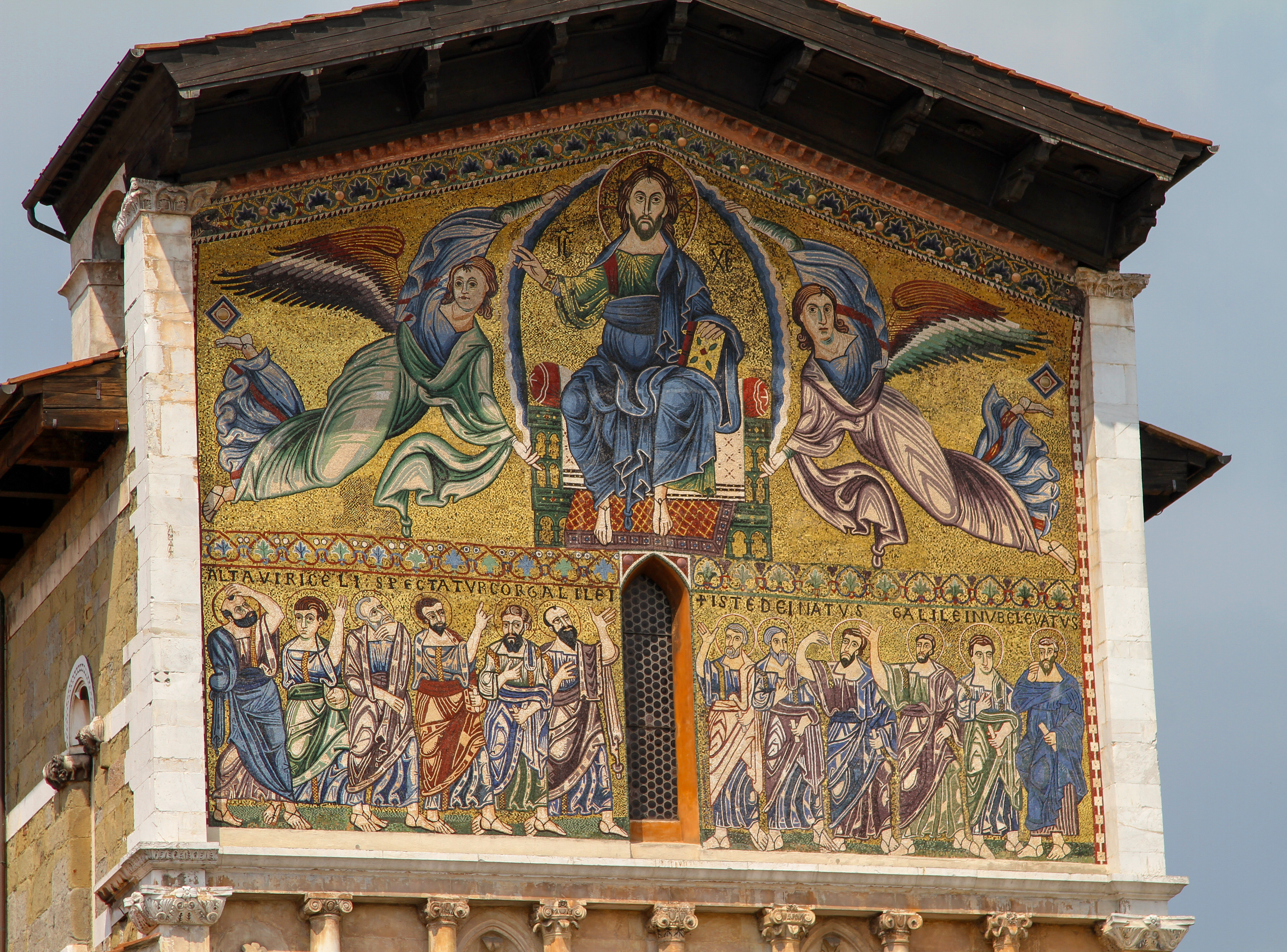
Basilica of San Frediano

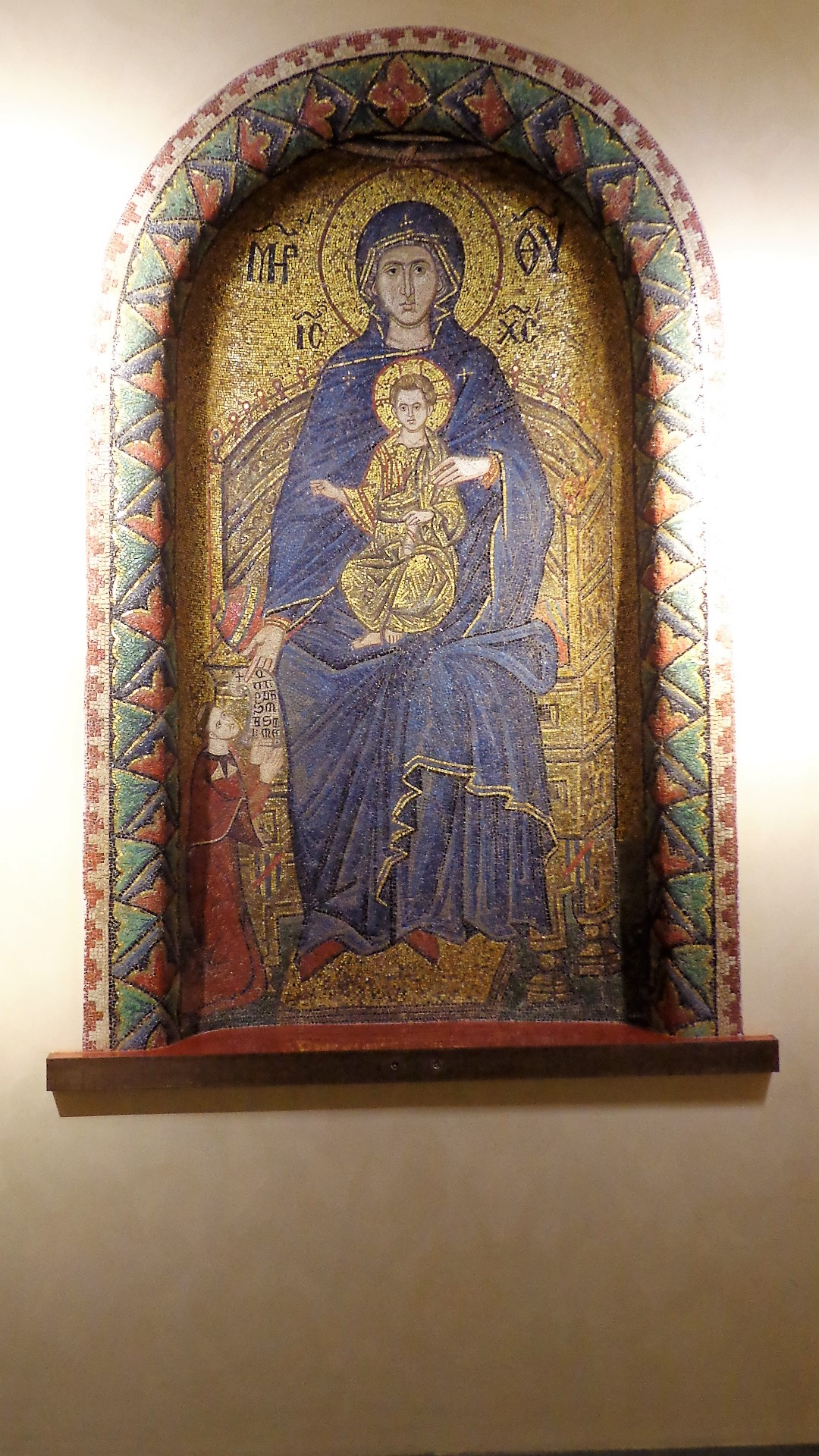
Messina

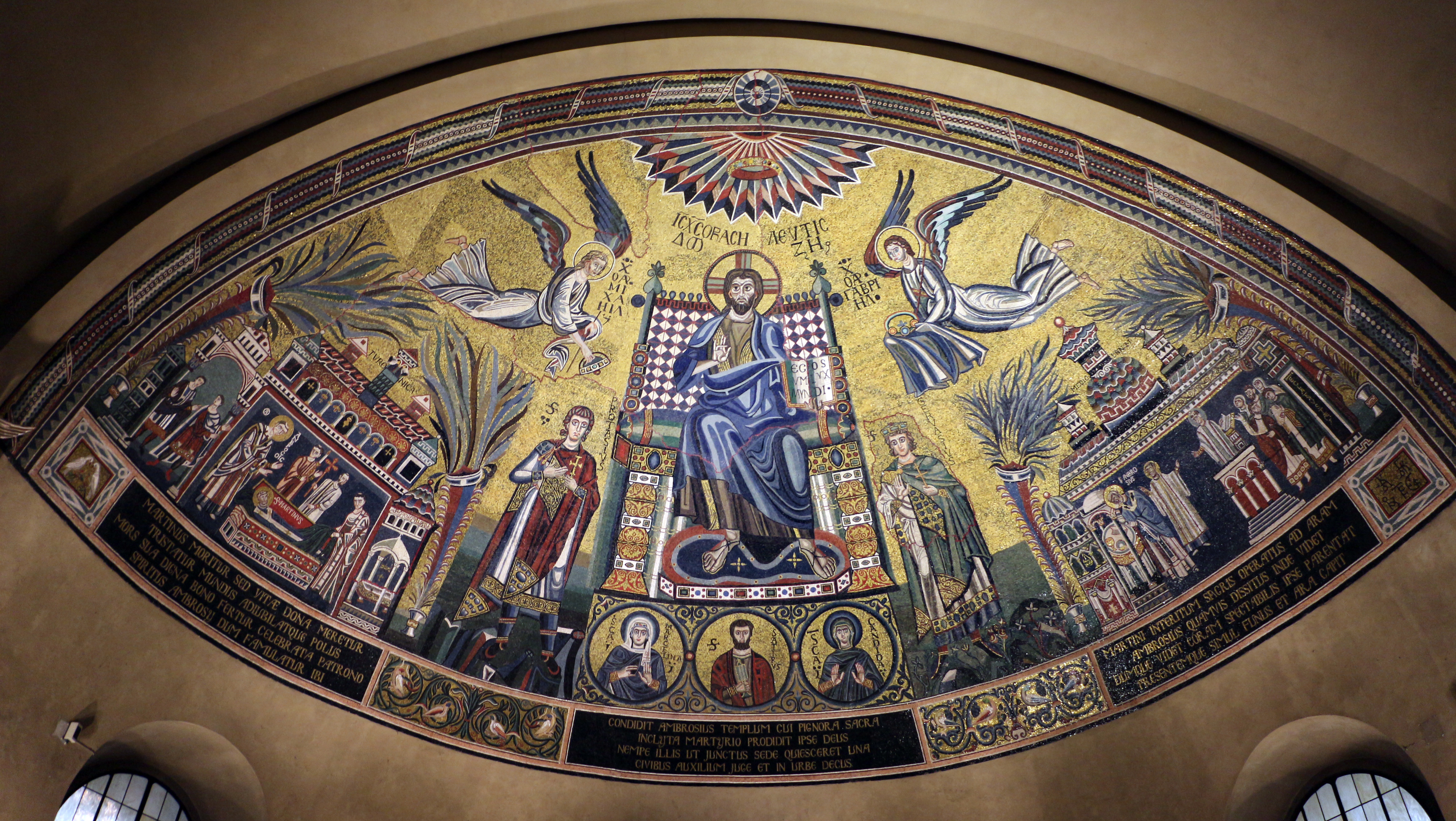
Basilica of Sant'Ambrogio

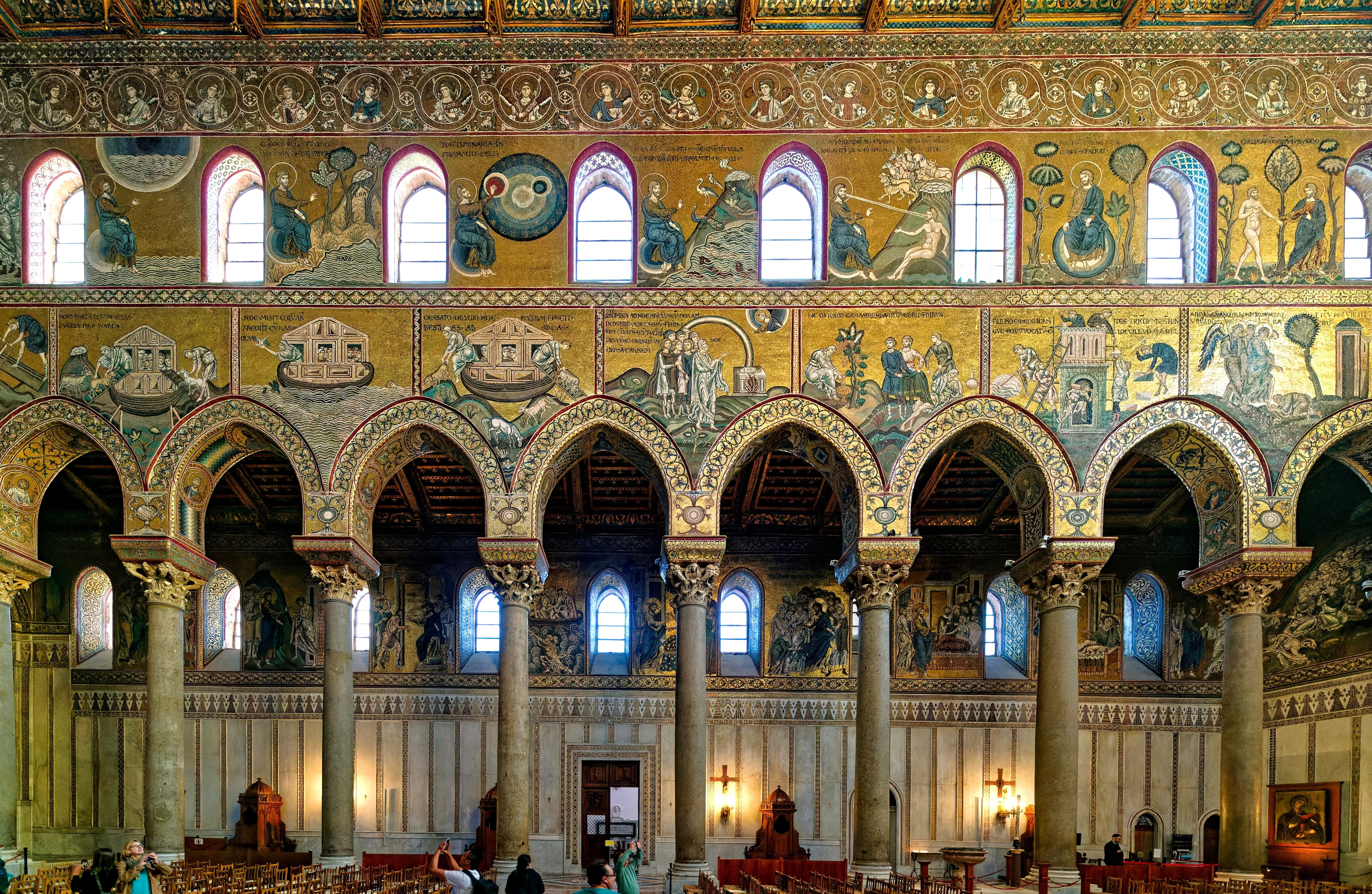
Monreale

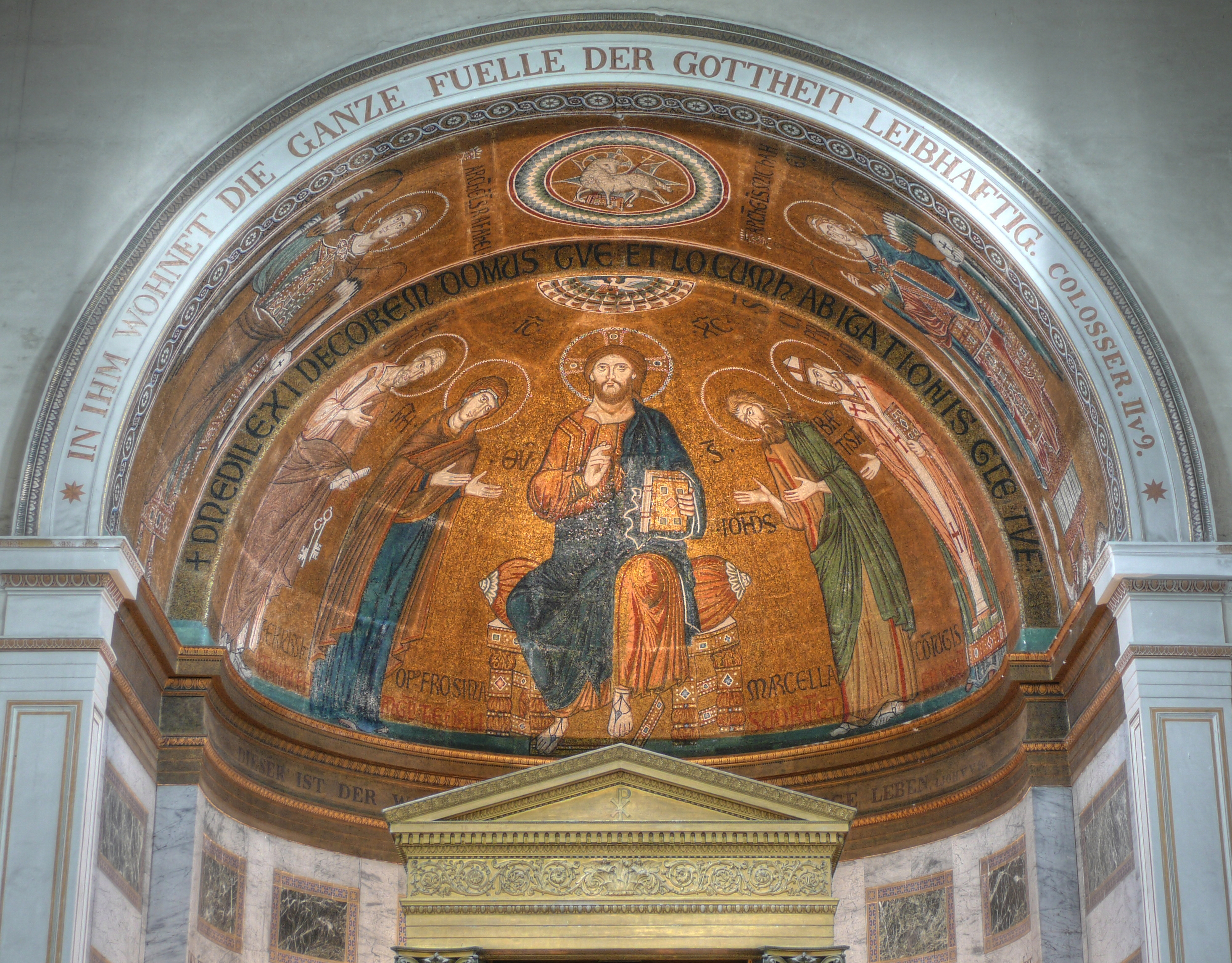
San Cipriano

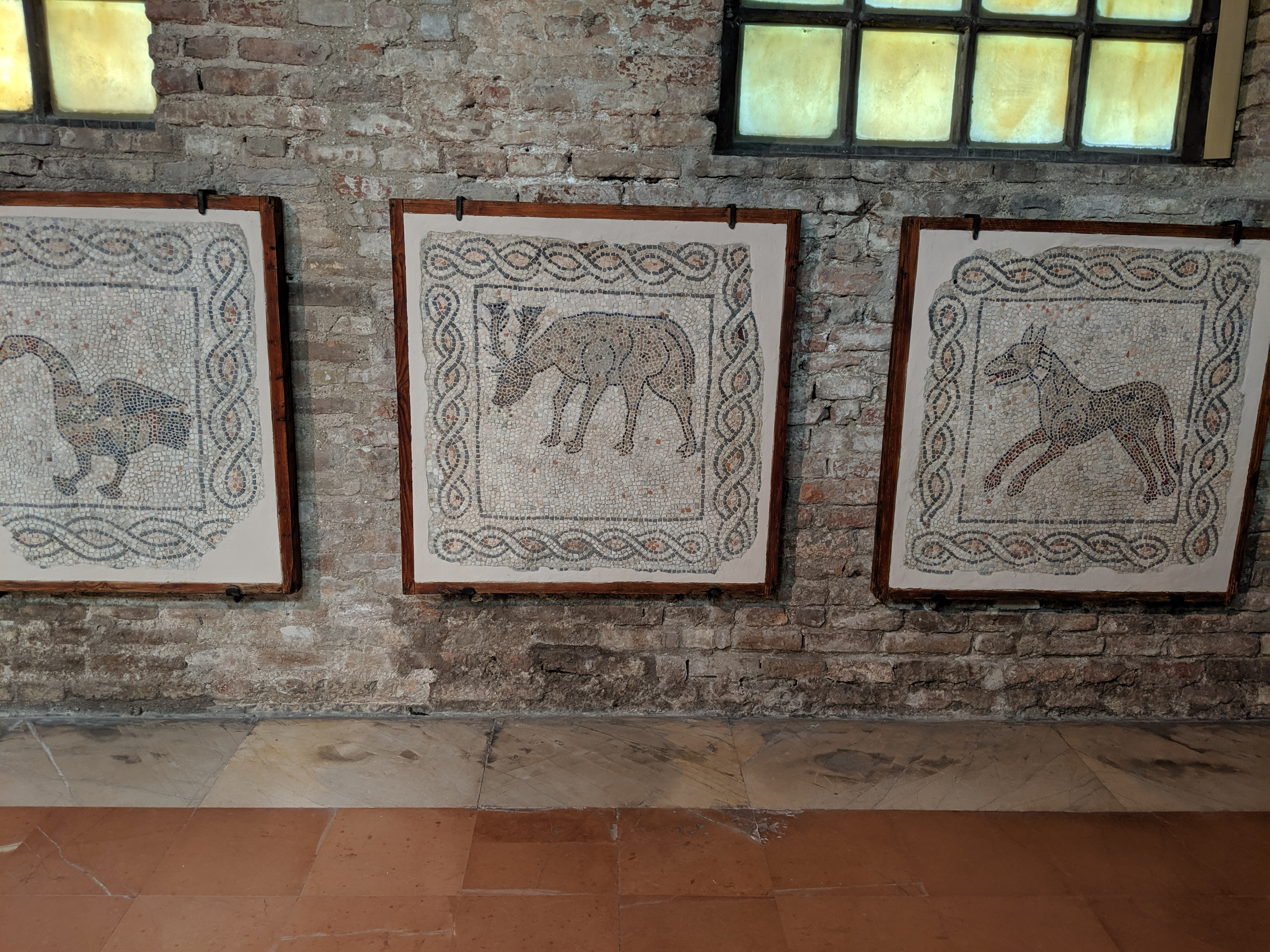
San Giovanni Evangelista

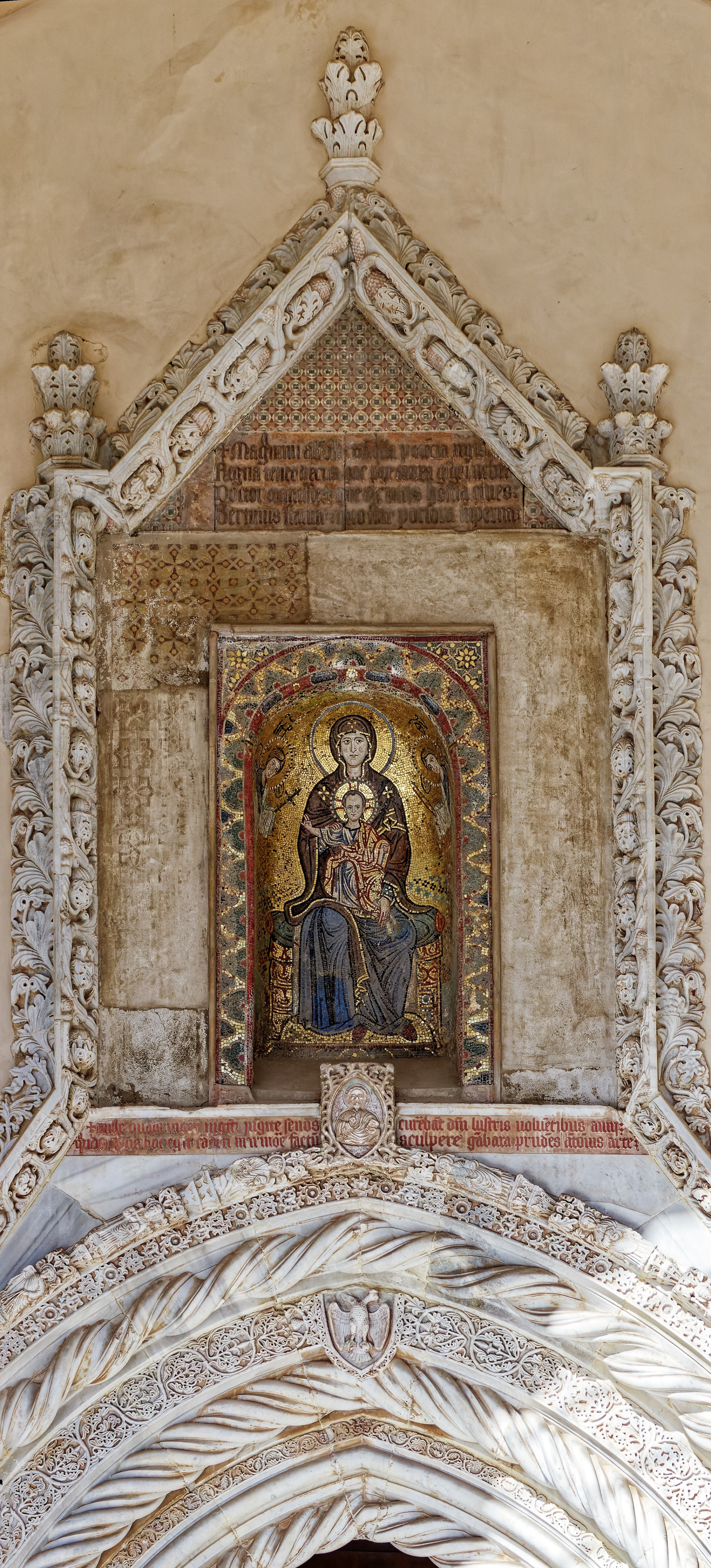
Palermo

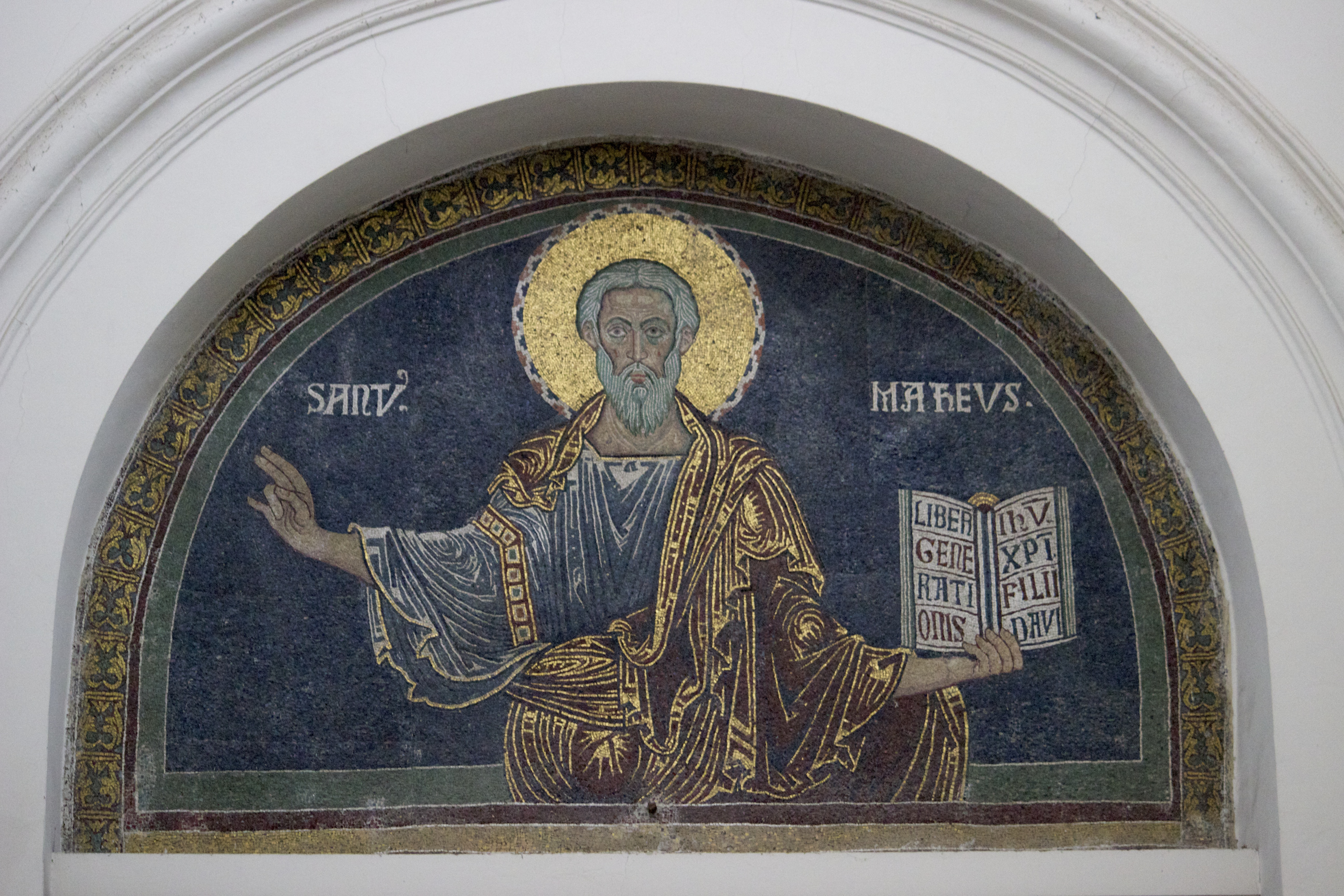
Salerno

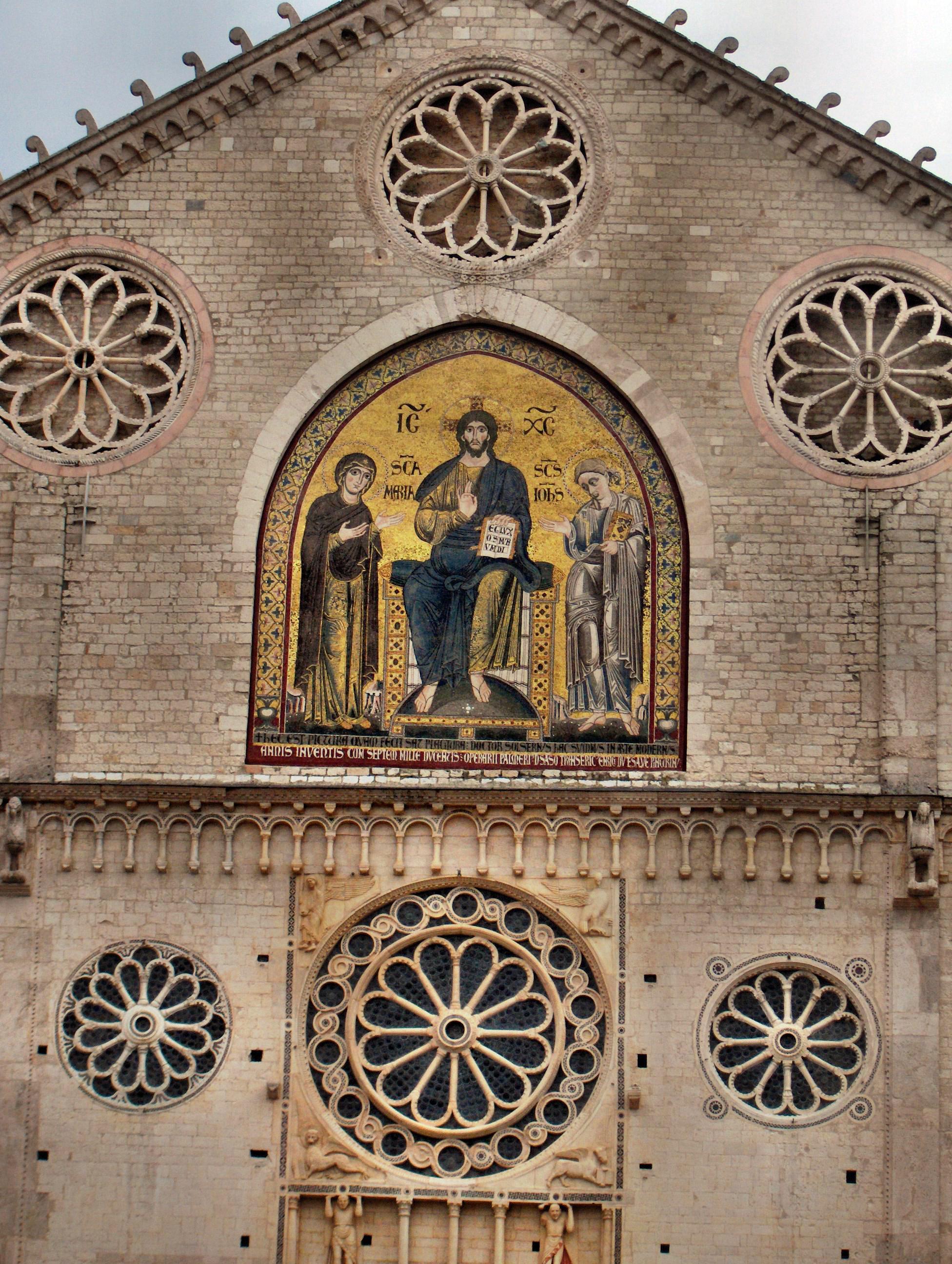
Mosaic by Solsternus on the facade of the Duomo (Spoleto)

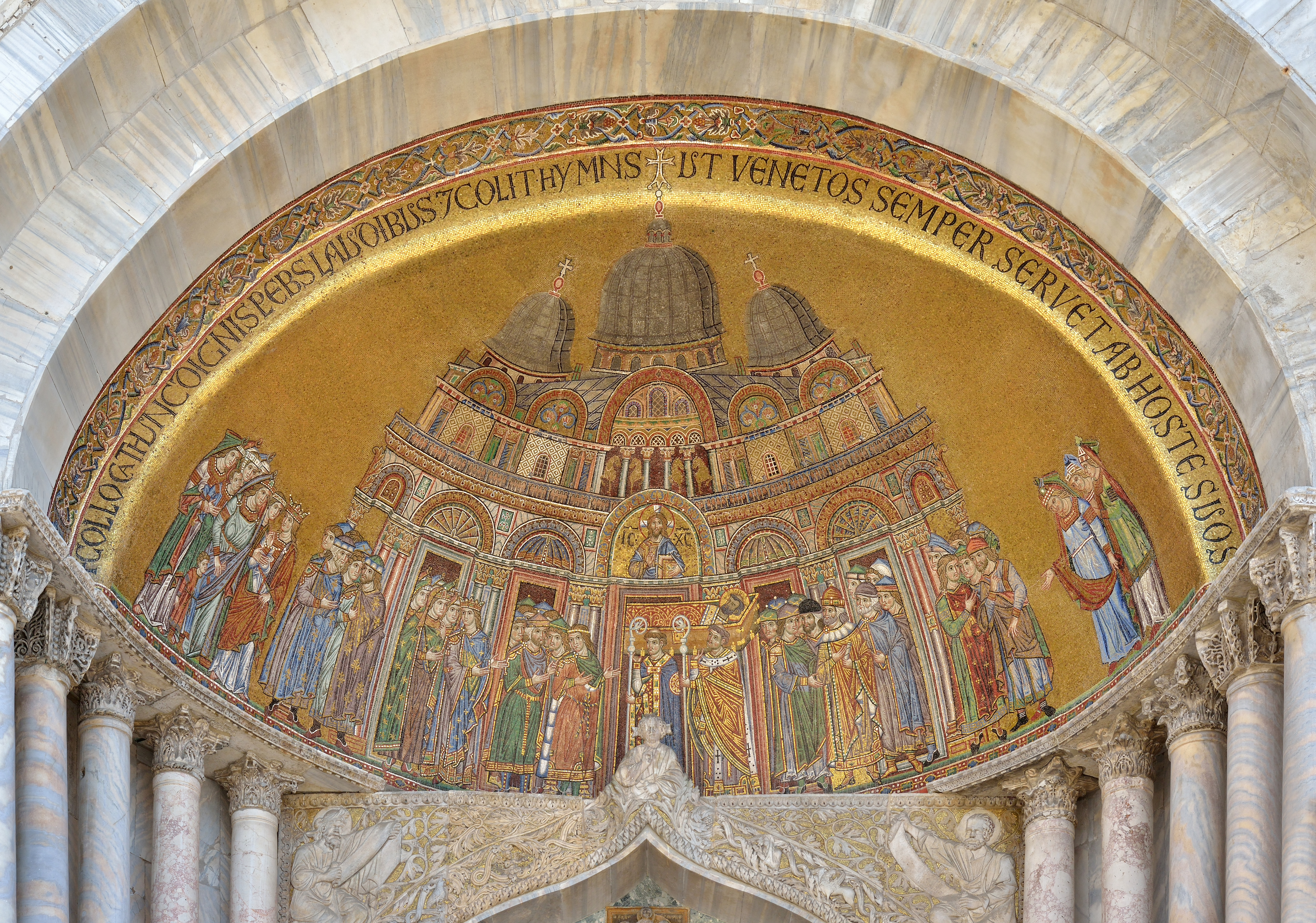
San Marco

==== Florence ====
- Florence Baptistery (of San Giovanni) — mosaics of dome (1240—1300) some by Meliore di Jacopo and Coppo di Marcovaldo, possibly Cimabue, later Corso di Buono, Penultimate Master and the Last Master. See Mosaic ceiling of the Florence Baptistery.
- Santa Maria del Fiori Cathedral — mosaic of the Coronation of the Virgin by Gaddo Gaddi, Master of Saint Cecilia (1296)
- Church of San Miniato al Monte (13th–14th) — apse mosaic by Gaddo Gaddi (1297), facade mosaic; zodiac floor (1207)
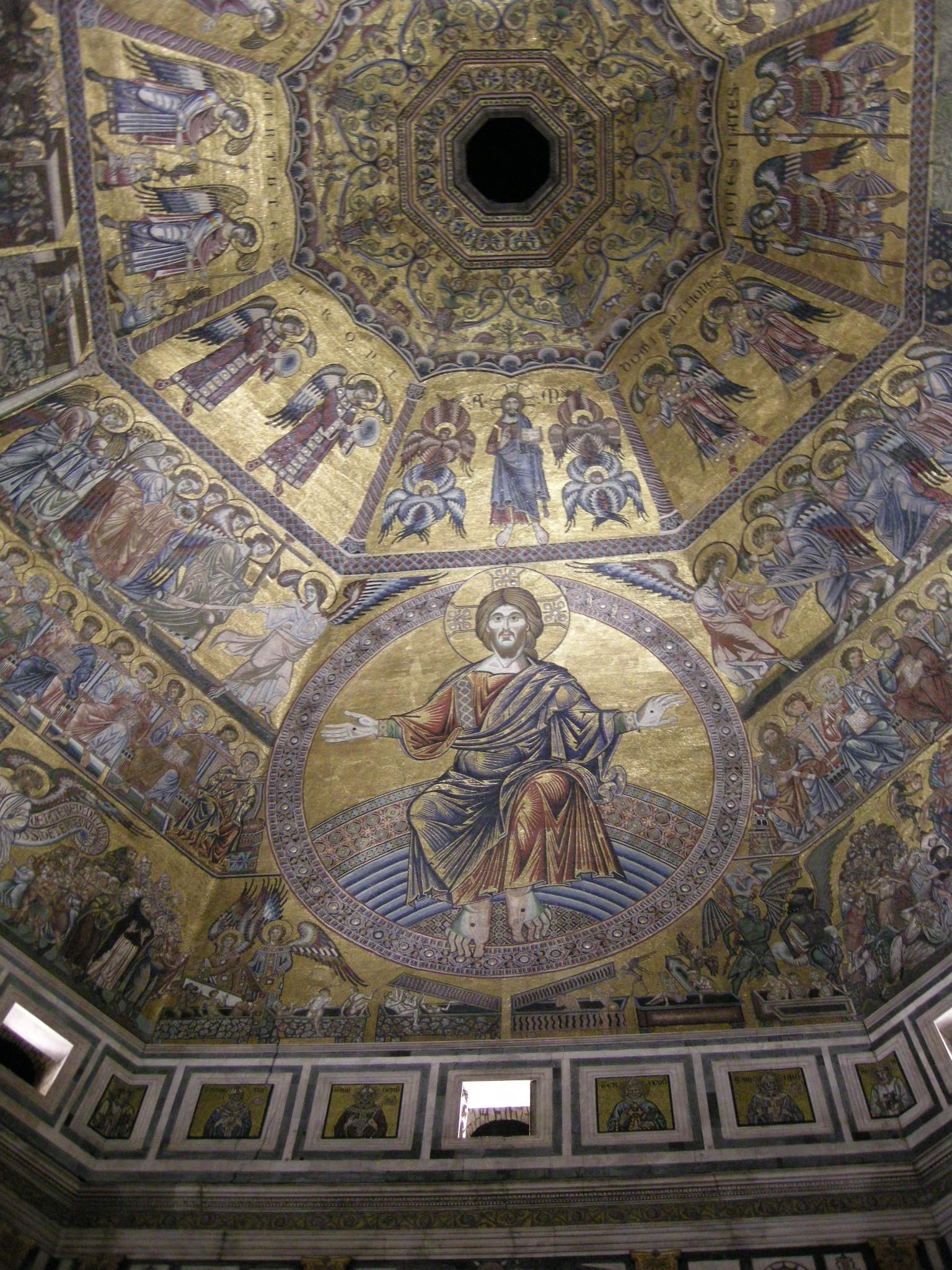
Florence Baptistery

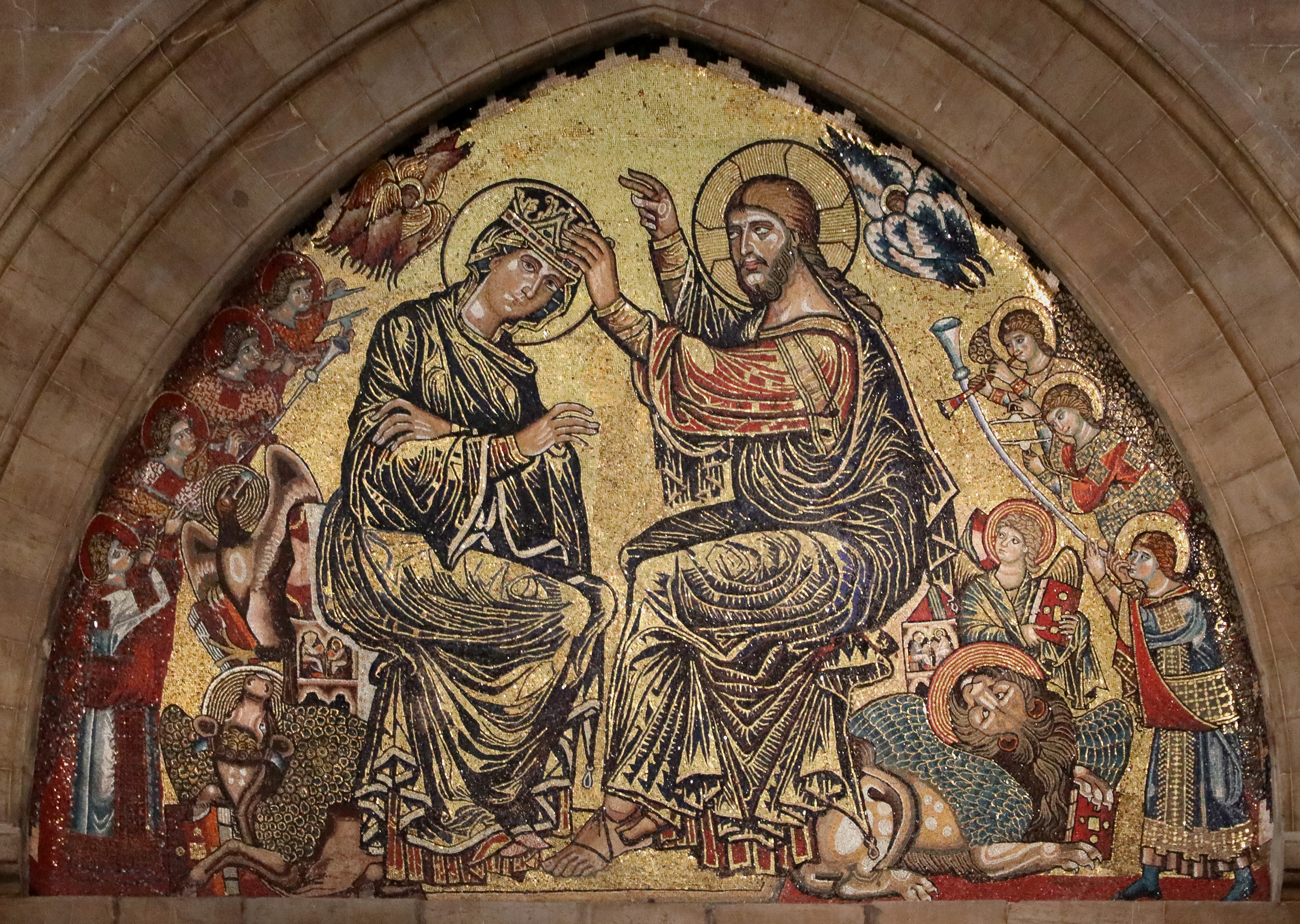
Santa Maria del Fiori

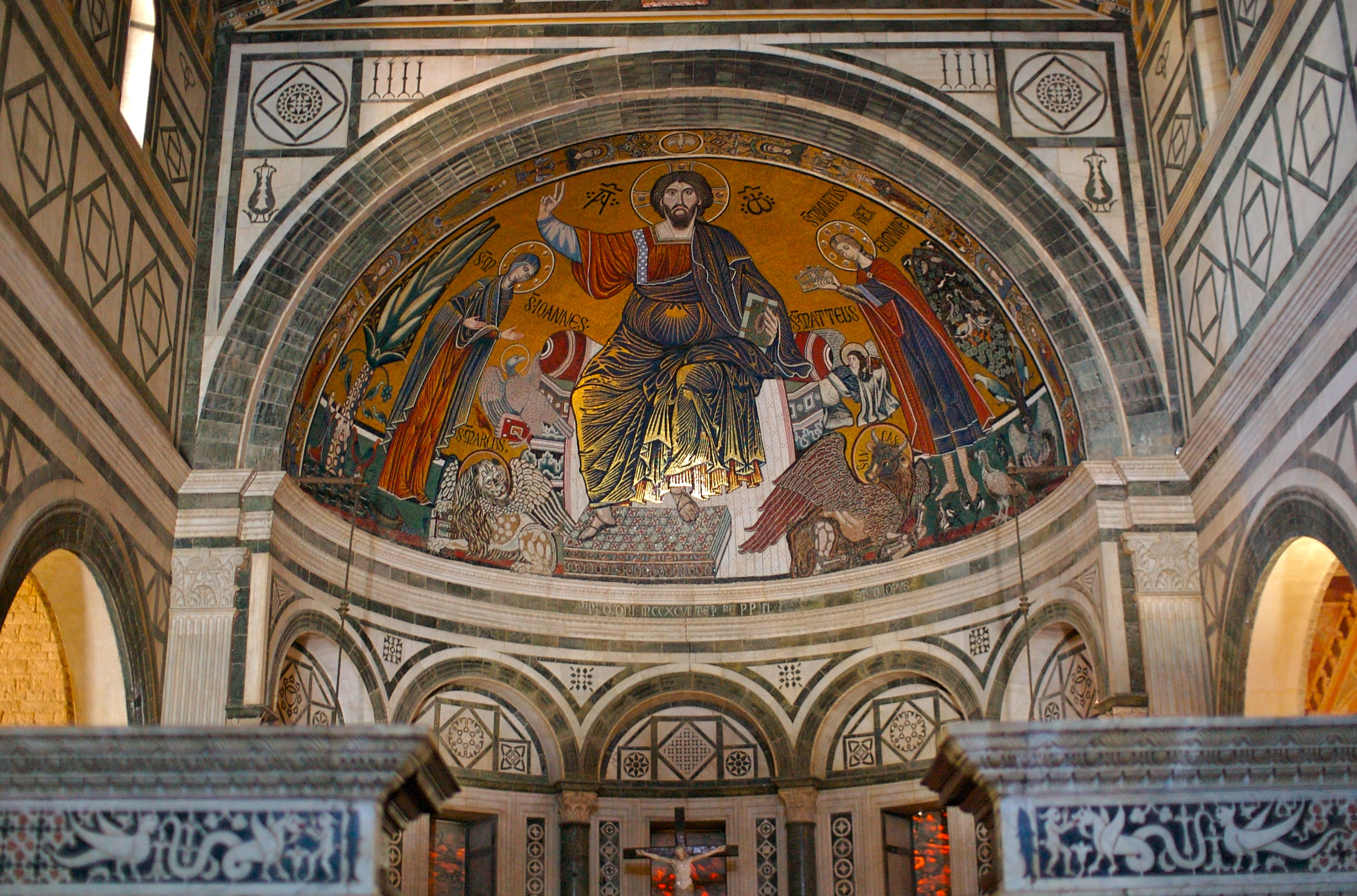
San Miniato al Monte

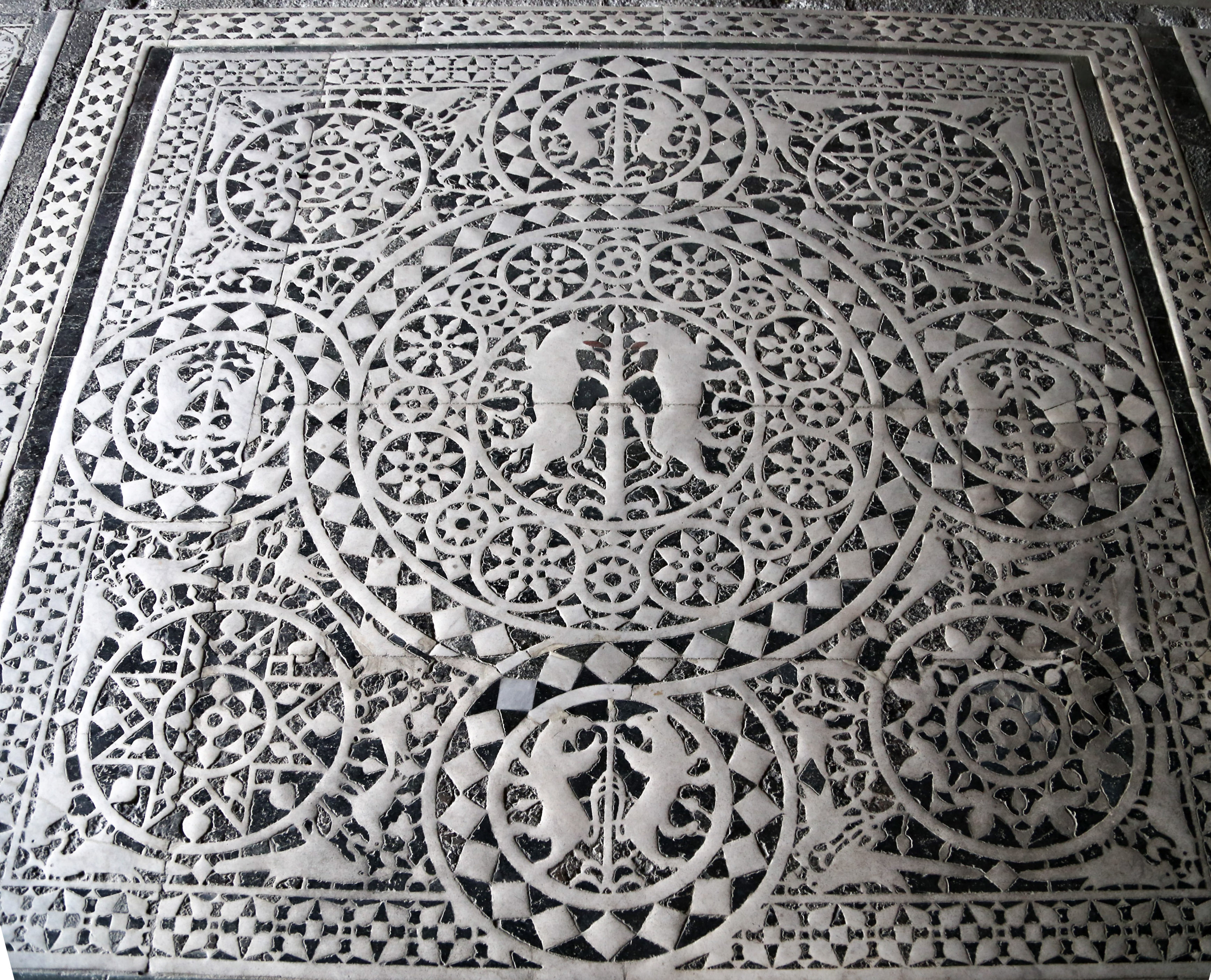
San Miniato al Monte (floor)

==== Rome ====
- Church of San Crisogono — altar contains a framed mosaic panel depicting Mary and Child, along with Saints James and Chrysogonus. It was moved here in the 17th century, when the church (originally built in the 5th century but rebuilt in the 12th and 17th centuries) was reconstructed. It is believed to be the work of Pietro Cavallini (c. 1259—1330) or his «school.»
- The Lateran Basilica (S. Giovanni) — apse mosaic (1288—1292) by Jacopo Torriti and Jacopo from Camerino with self-portraits
- Church of Santa Maria in Trastevere (1291) — pannos by Pietro Cavallini about Virgin
- Church of Santa Maria Maggiore — apse mosaic (1296) by Jacopo Torriti with signature; mosaic from old facade with Colonna family by Filippo Rusuti with signature; mosaic on the Tomb of Cardinal Consalvo Rodriguez (c. 1296), cirle of Pietro Cavallini
- Old St. Peter's Basilica — Navicella (mosaic) (1298) by Giotto. Fragments survived
- Santa Maria sopra Minerva — Tomb of Guillaume V Durand (d. 1296), with signature of Giovanni di Cosma
- Sancta Sanctorum
- Church of San Tommaso in Formis — tondo, signature 1218 by Master Jacopo and his son Cosmatus
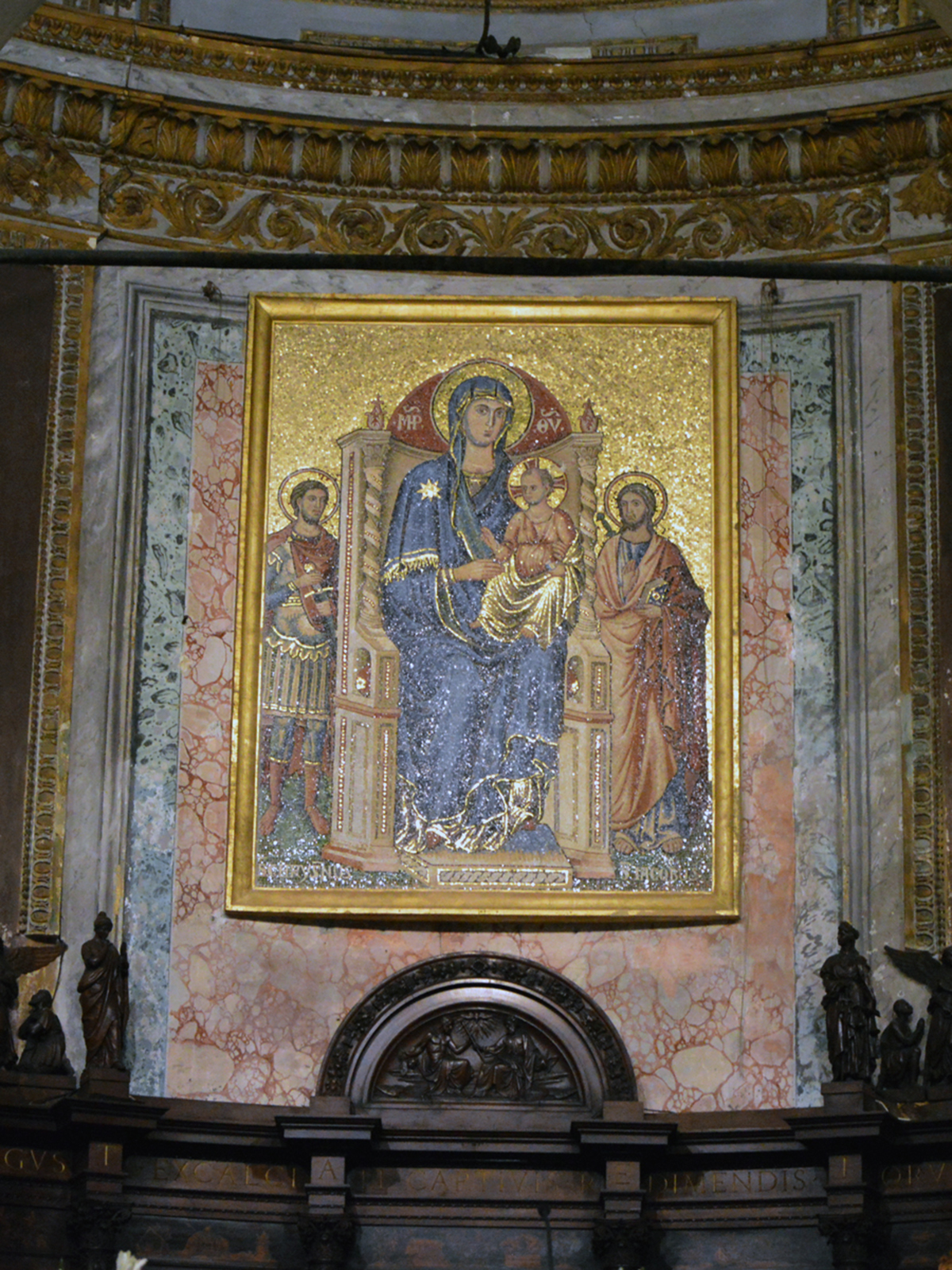
San Crisogono

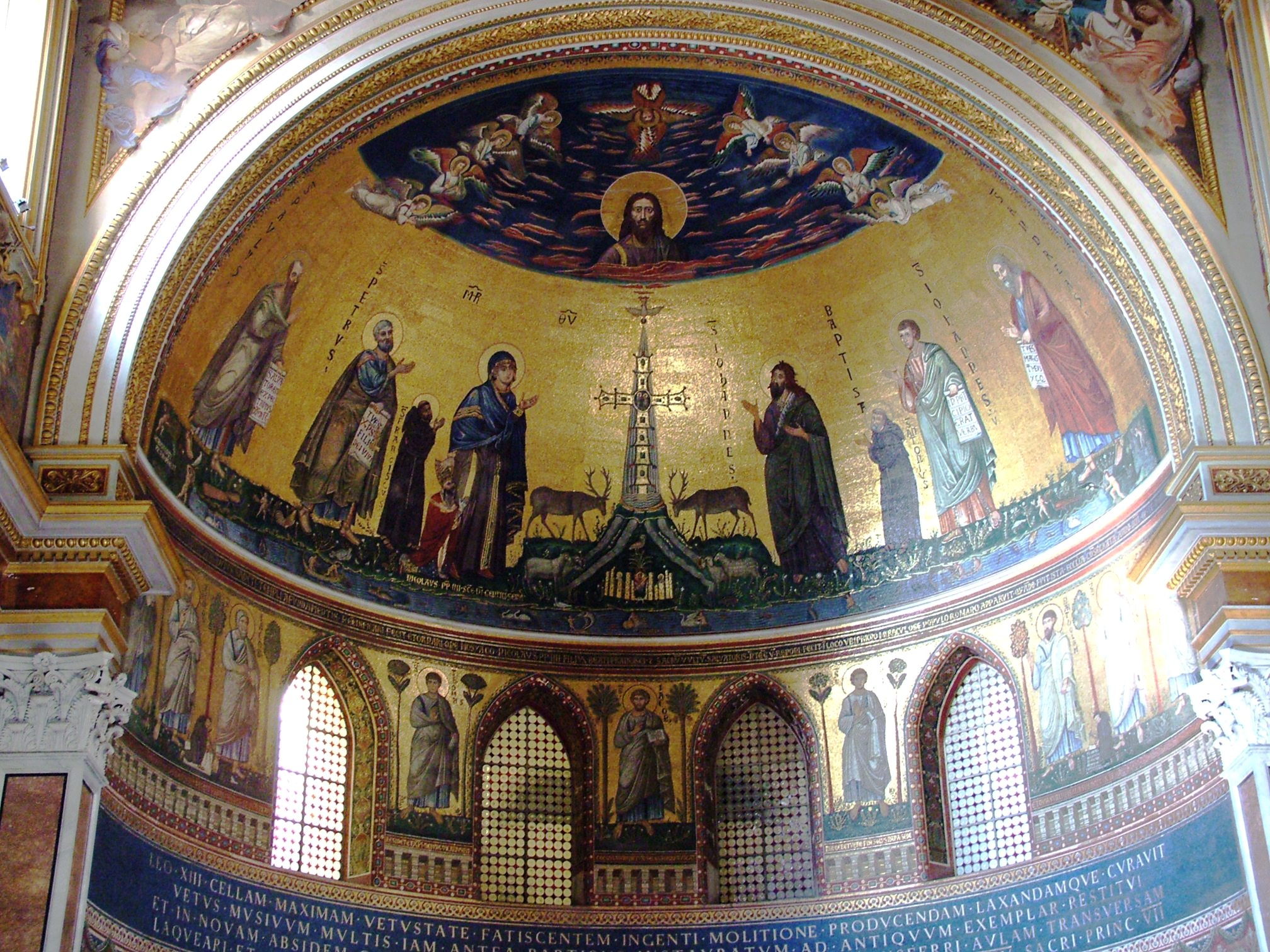
Lateran

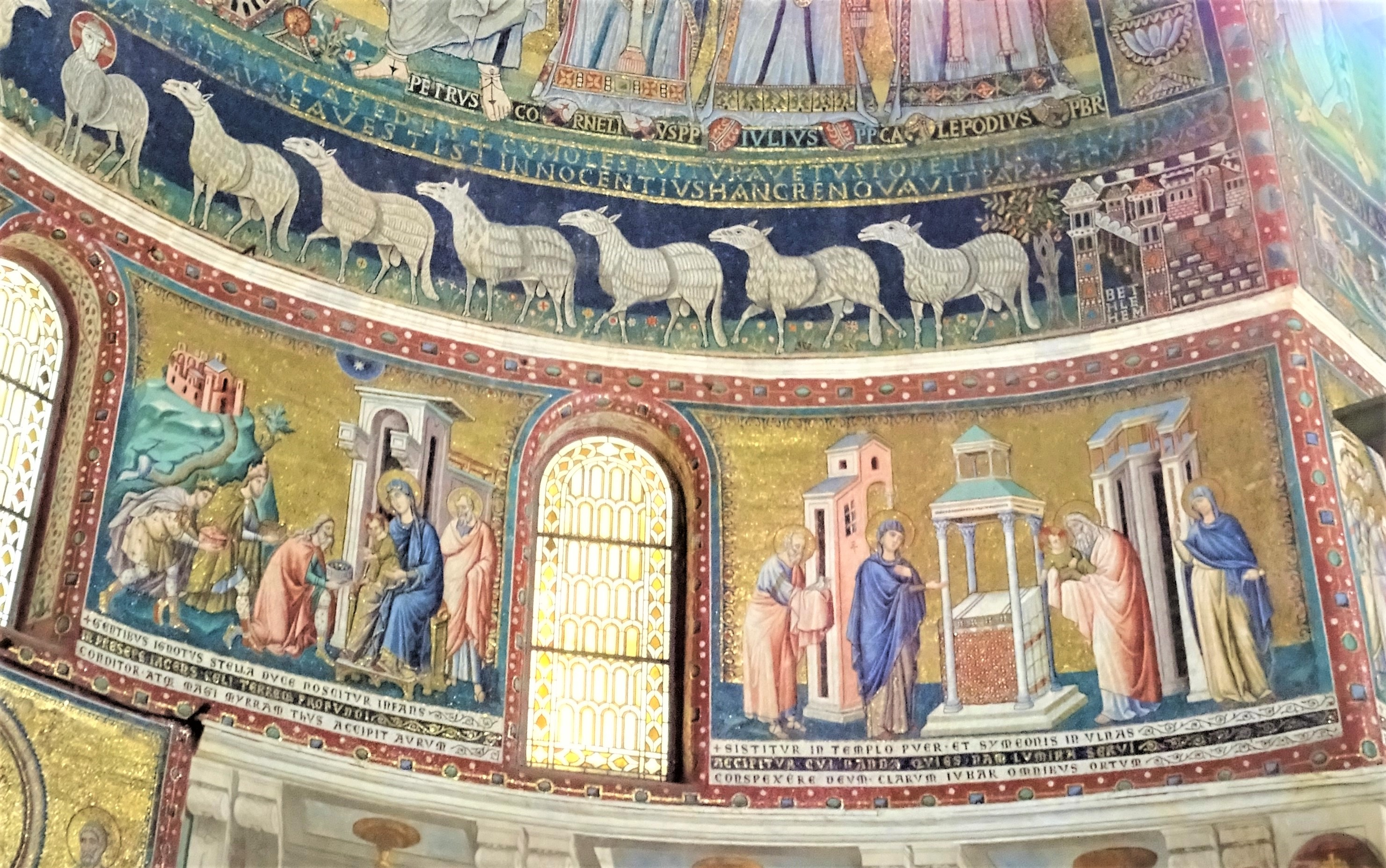
Santa Maria in Trastevere

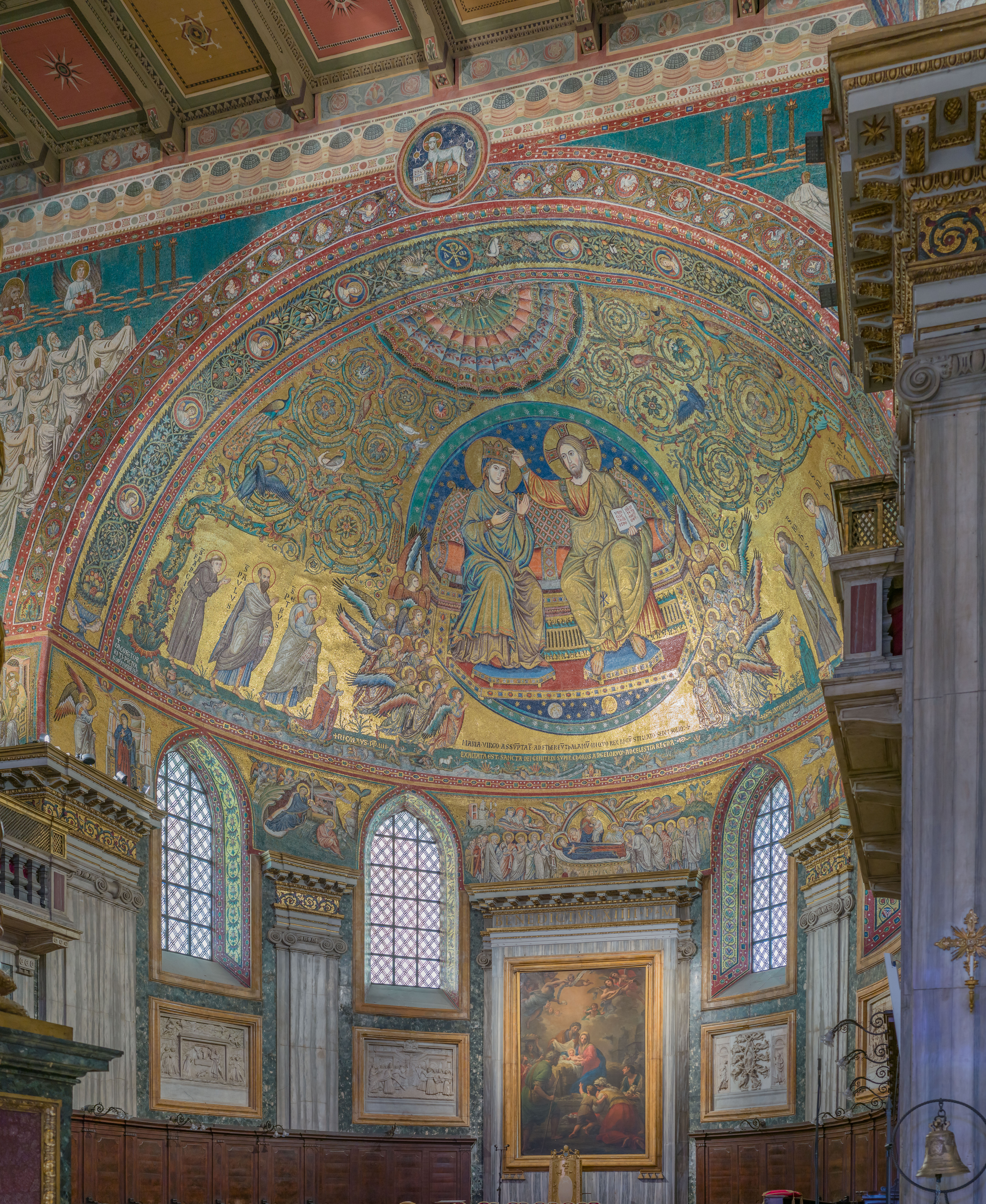
Santa Maria Maggiore

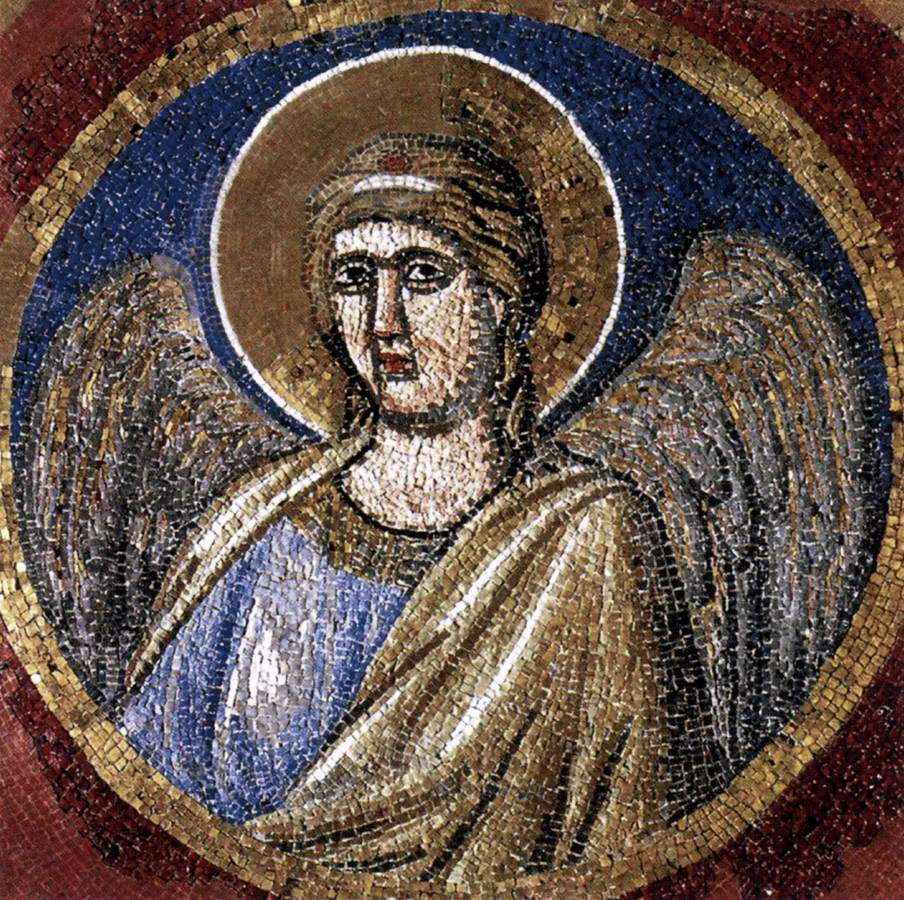
Navicella

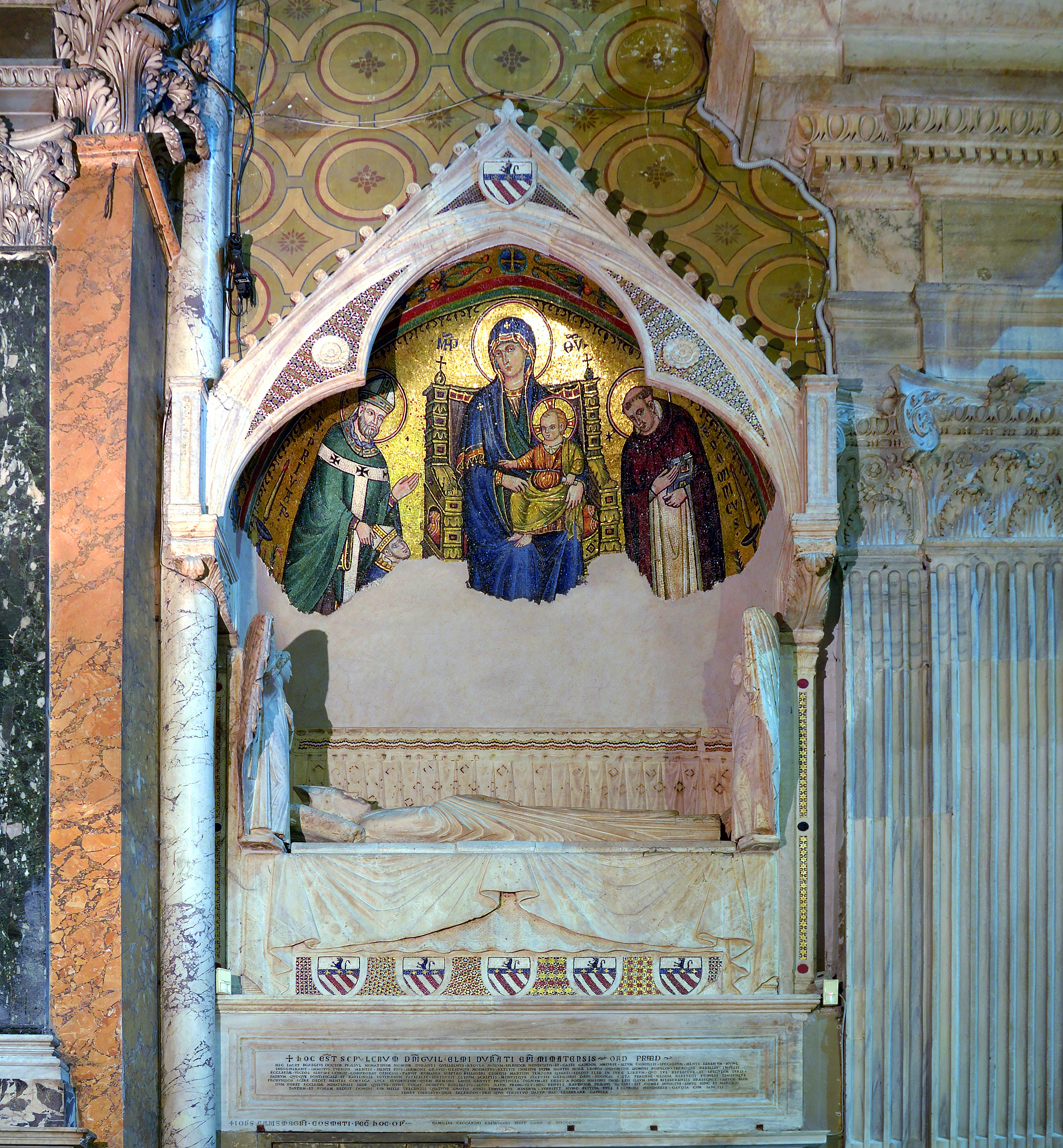
Santa Maria sopra Minerva

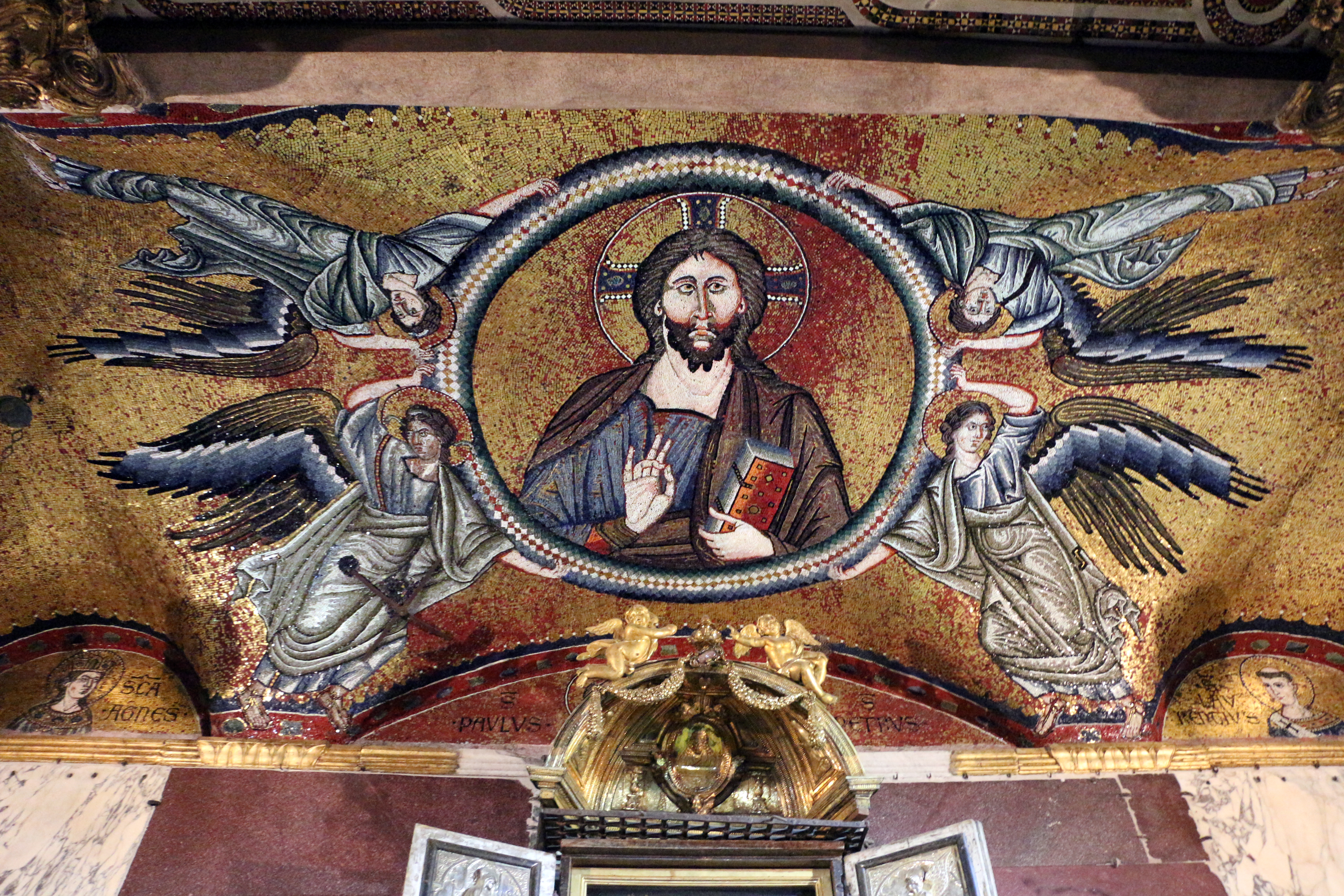
Sancta Sanctorum

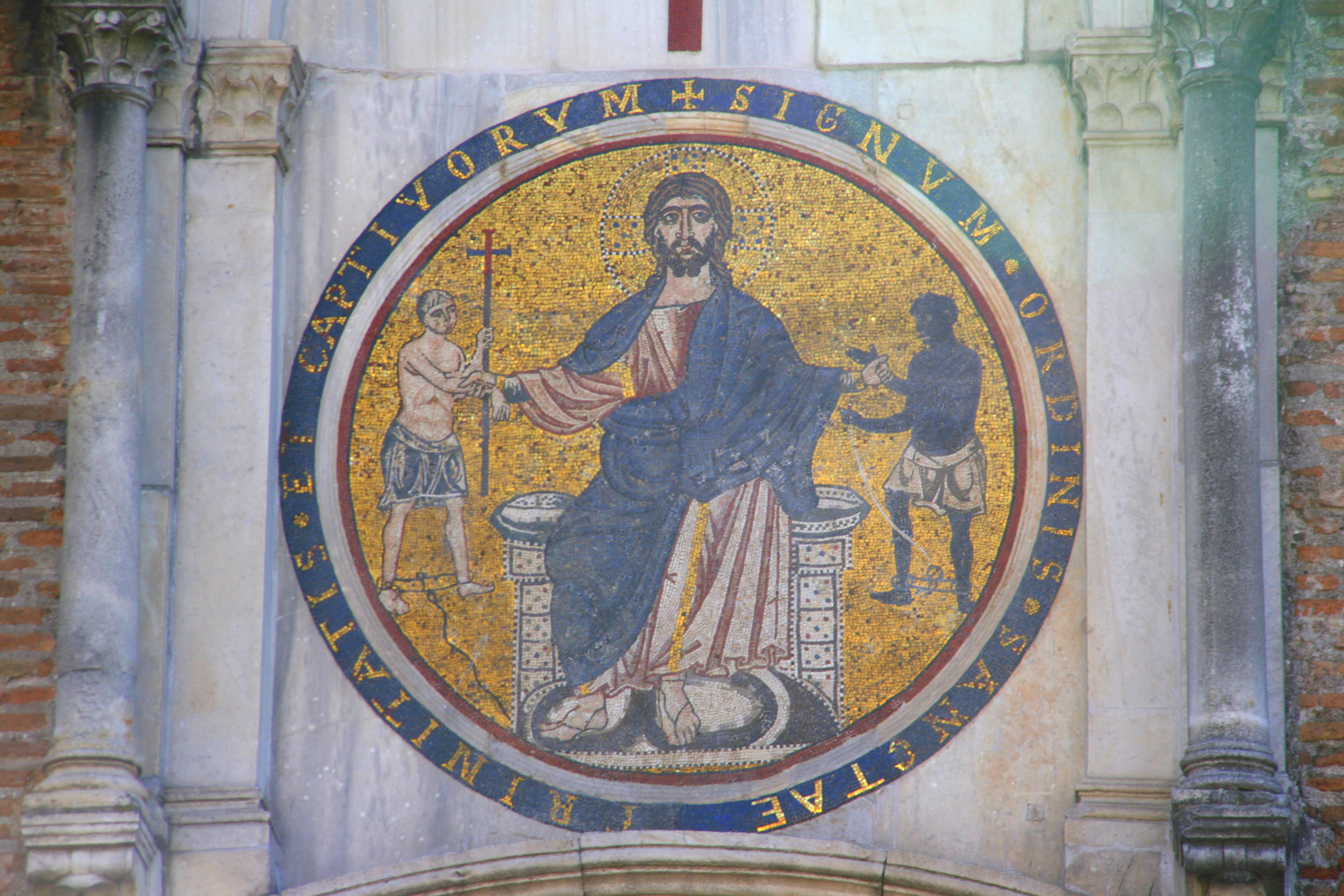
San Tommaso in Formis

=== France ===
- Amiens, fr:Labyrinthe de la cathédrale d'Amiens (1288), destroyed, now existed 19th-century copy
- Reims, Labyrinth of the Reims Cathedral floor (circa 1290), destroyed
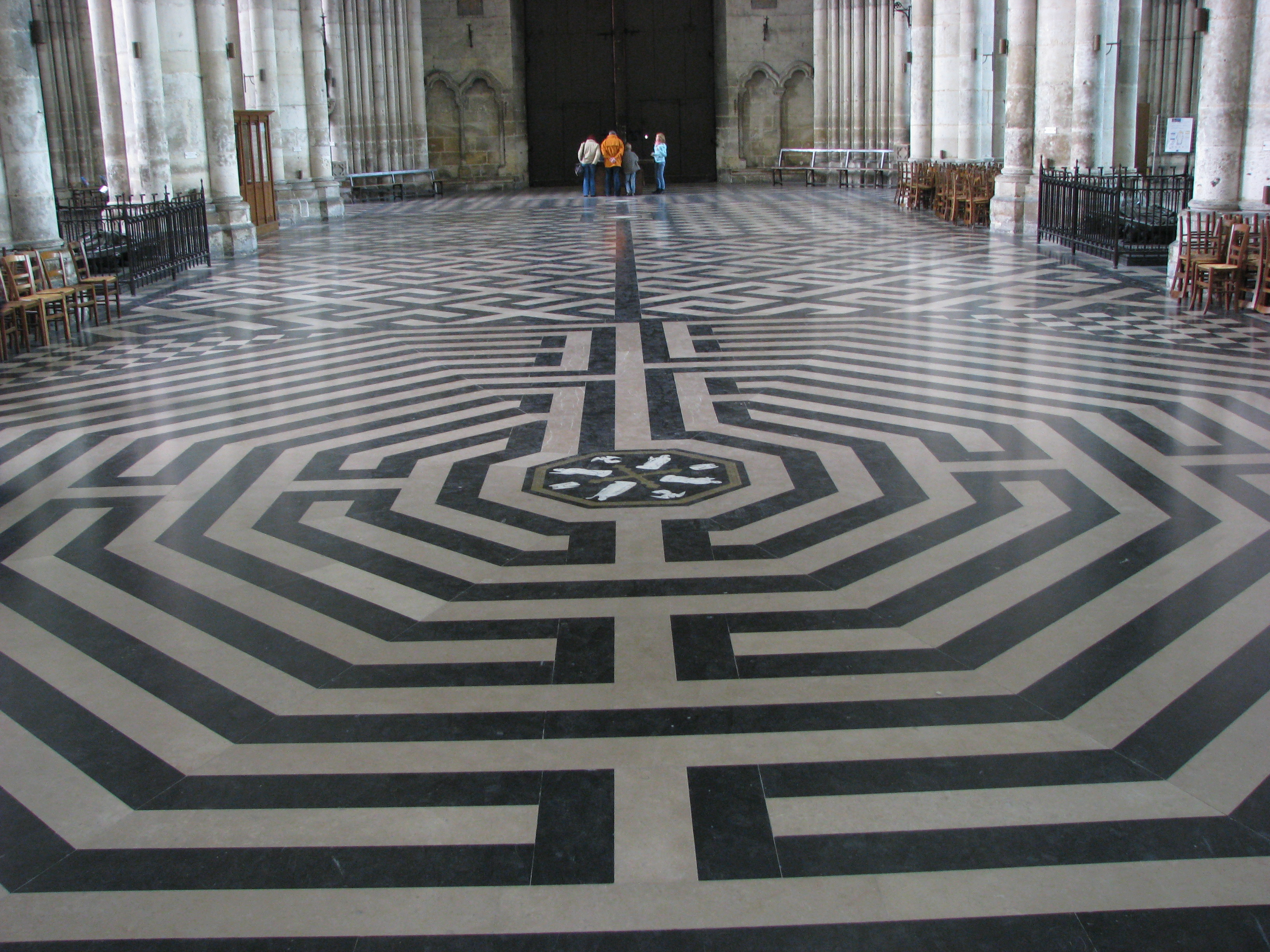
Amiens

=== Greece ===
- Arta, Church of the Parigoritissa
- Mount Athos, Vatopedi Monastery — mosaics in Katholikon, second mosaic with scene of the Annunciation (late 13th or early 14th century)
- Pyli, Church of Porta Panagia — two eastern pessaries feature mosaics with full-length depictions of Jesus Christ and the Theotokos Brephokratousa
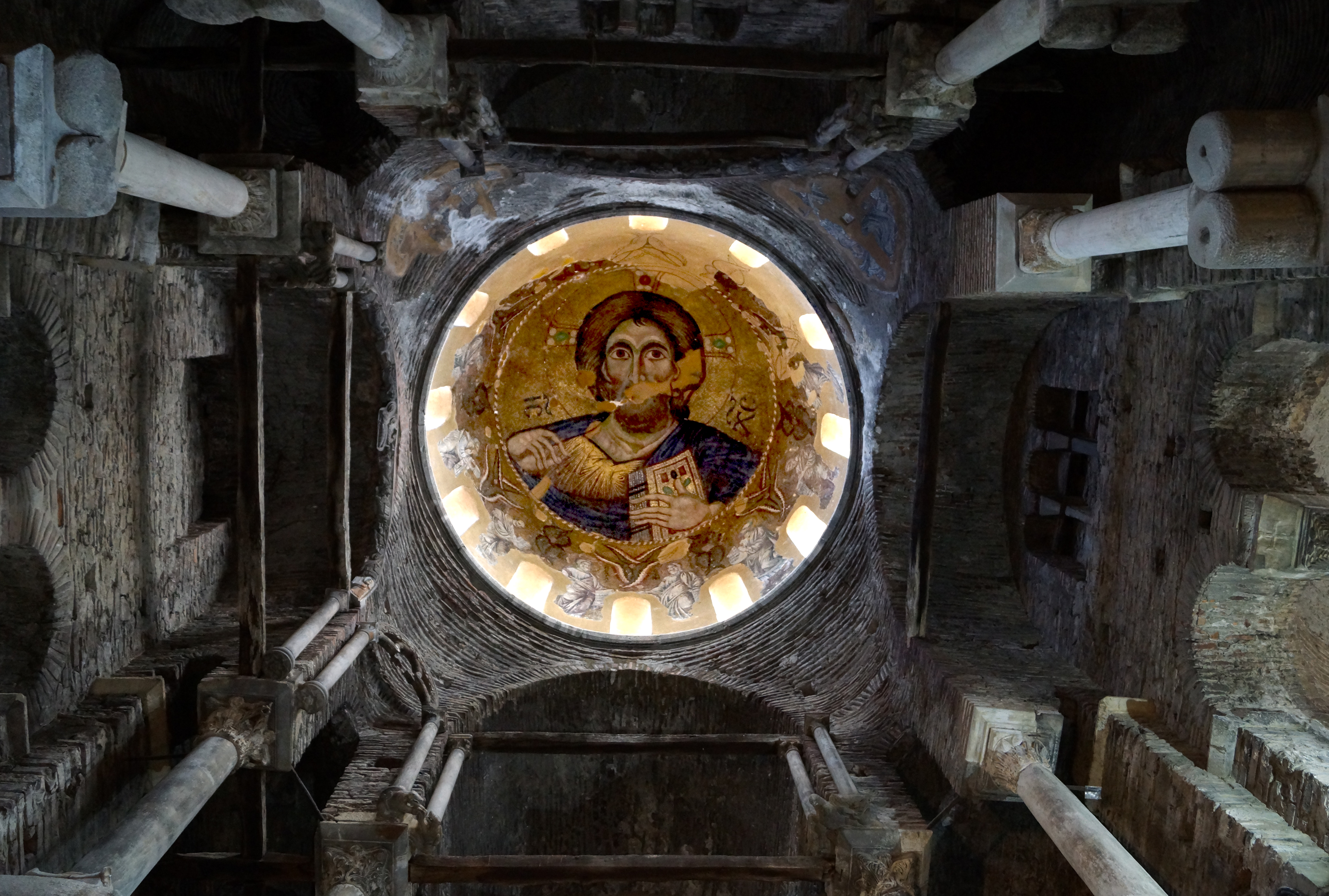
Arta

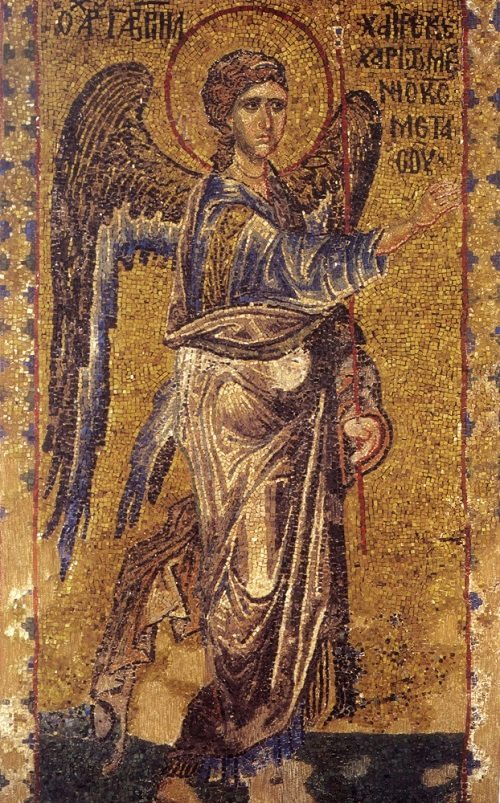
Vatoped

=== Levant ===
Islamic mosaics

- Damascus (Syria), Umayyad Mosque — restorations, including new mosaics on Qubbat al-Khazna pavilion (13–14th century)
- Damascus (Syria), Mausoleum of Baybars (Madrasa al-Zahiriyya / Zahiriyya Library)
- Jerusalem (Israel), Dome of the Chain (Qubbat al-Silsila)
- Jerusalem (Israel), Dome of the Rock — restorations
- Tripoli (Lebanon), Al-Burtasi Mosque — mihrab
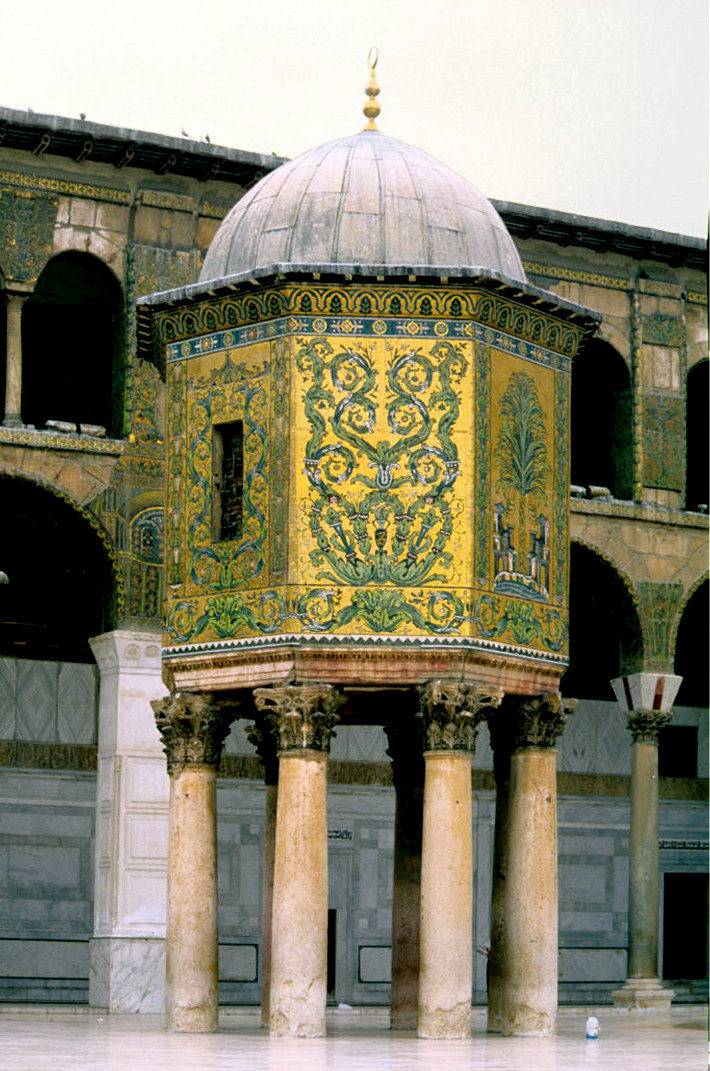
Qubbat al-Khazna

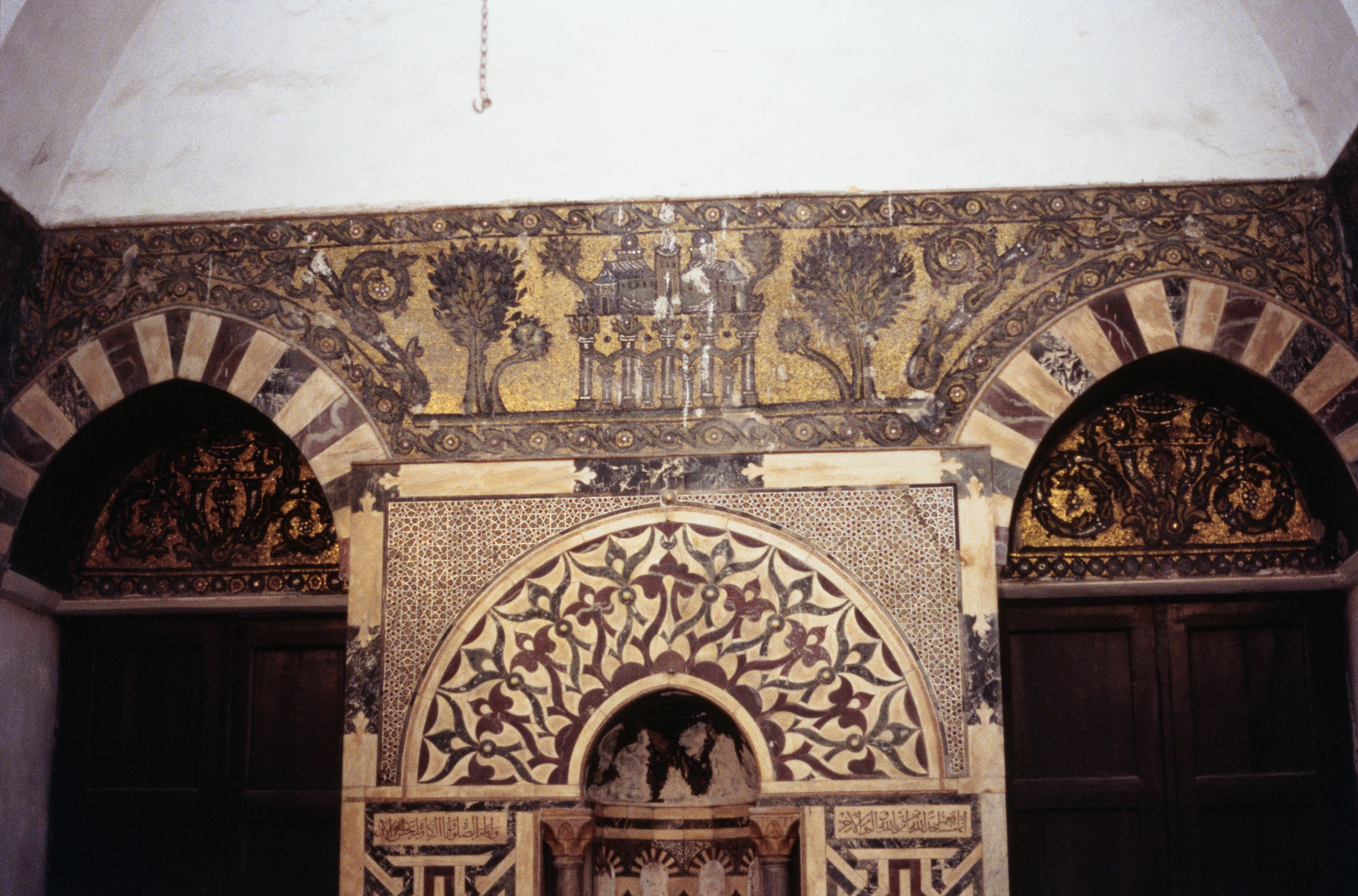
Madrasa al-Zahiriyya

=== Turkey, Istanbul ===
- Hagia Sophia — Deesis mosaic
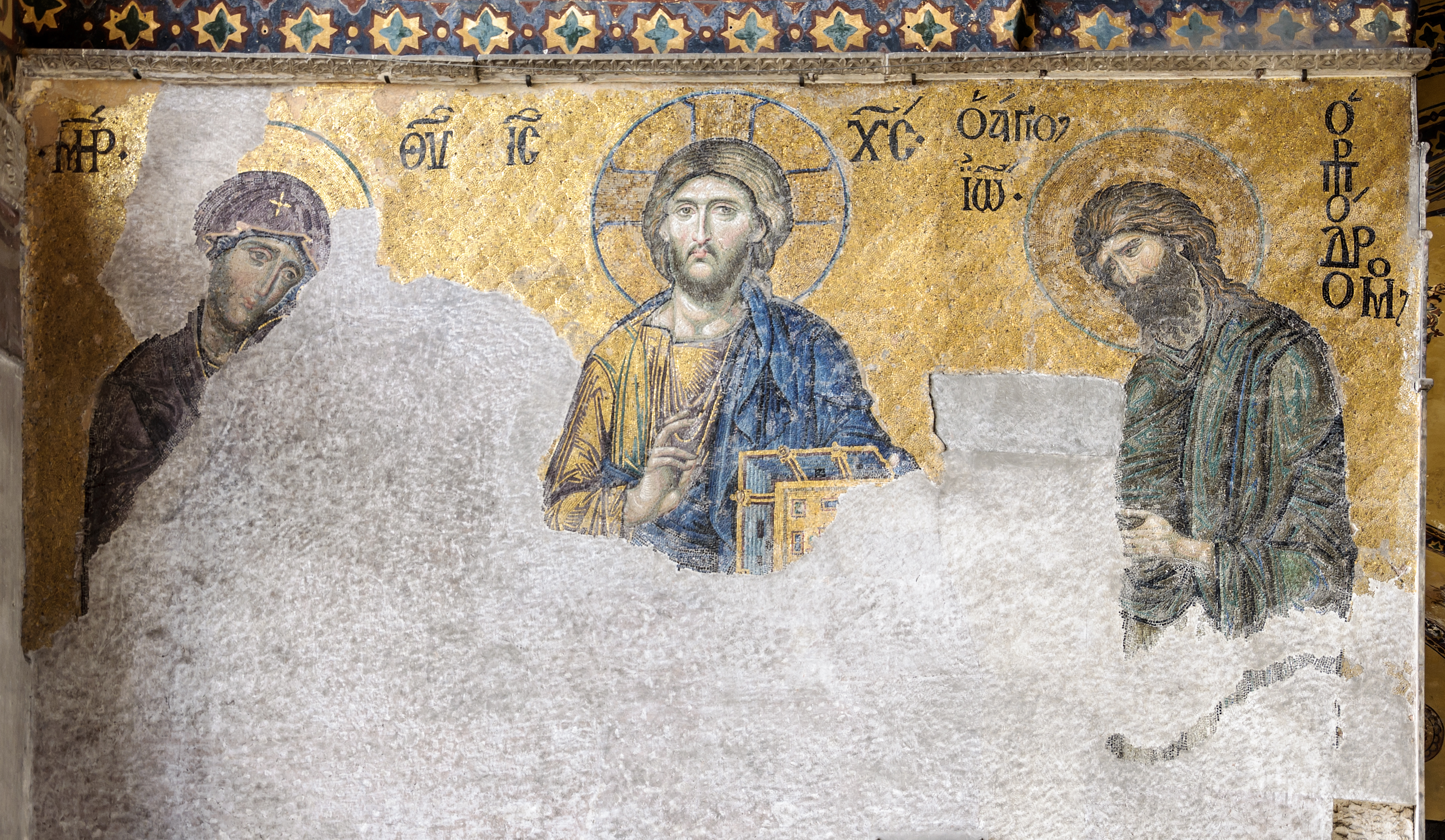
Hagia Sophia, Deesis

== 14th century ==
=== Czech Republic, Prague ===
- St. Vitus Cathedral — facade mosaic, so called cs:Zlatá brána (Pražský hrad). Plus several mosaics in lunettes at the same facade.
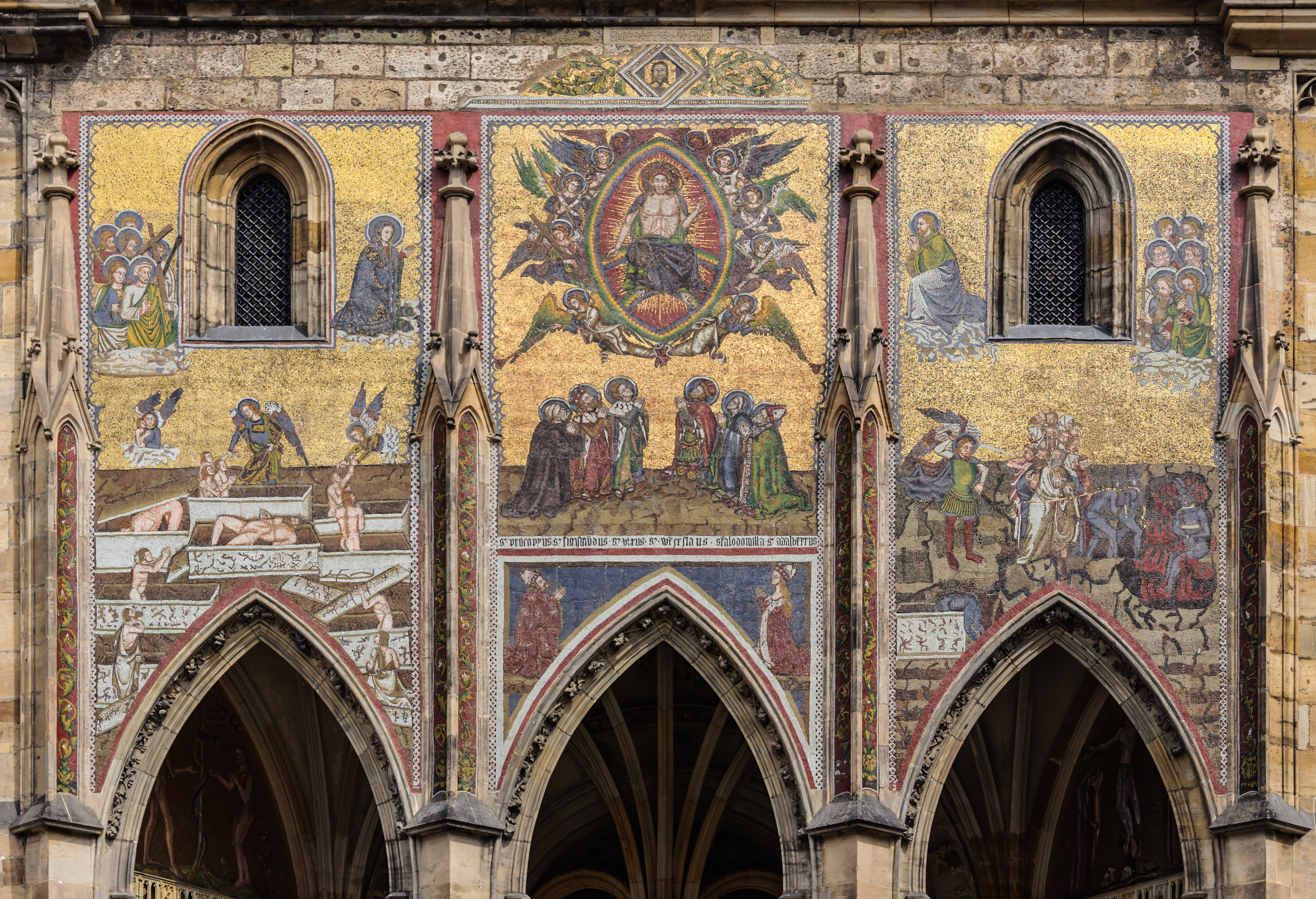

=== Egypt, Cairo ===
- Madrasa of the Emir Sayf al-Din Aqbugha (White Ox) at Al-Azhar Mosque — entrance, qibla wall, and the mihrabs with glass mosaics
- Madrasa of Emir Taybars / Taybarsiyya Madrasa at Al-Azhar Mosque — mihrab
- Mosque of Amir al-Maridani
- Sitt Hadaq Mosque / Sitt Miska Mosque مسجد الست حدق (مسكة)) — mihrab
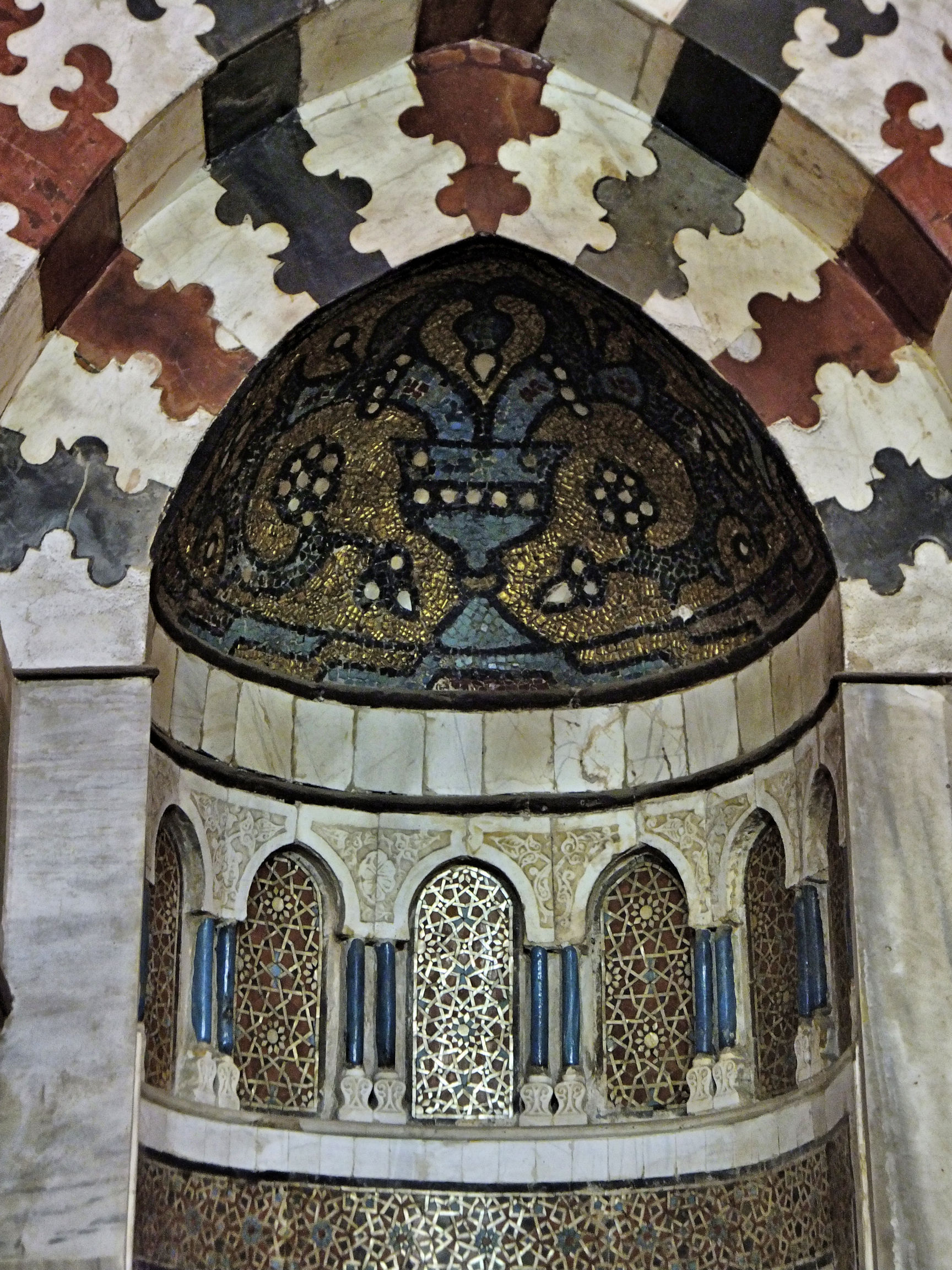
Aqbugha

=== Greece, Thessaloniki ===
- Church of the Holy Apostles (1320-1330s)
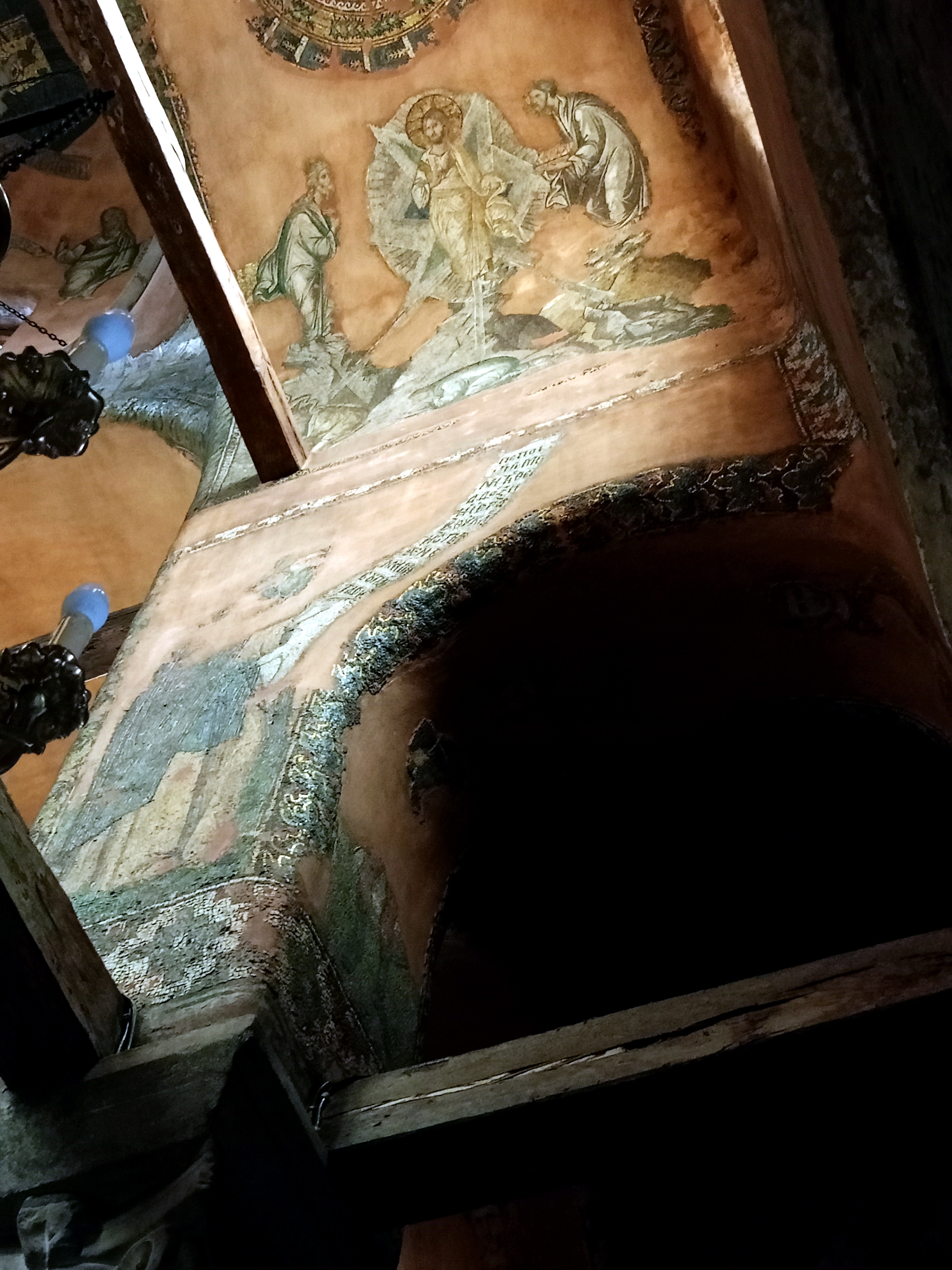
Church of the Holy Apostles

=== Italy ===
- Florence, Florence Baptistery of San Giovanni — below the main vault, interspersed with rectangular openings, are mosaic depictions of saints, popes, bishops, and martyr deacons, and on the outside faces of the gallery-level parapets are busts of patriarchs and prophets, all from the early 14th century. Among the artists involved were Gaddo Gaddi and the Penultimate Master. Also of this period are the mosaics within the galleries, first those from above the south door, and then those above the east door, attributable to Gaddo Gaddi and Lippo di Benivieni.
- Messina, Messina Cathedral / Santa Maria Assunta — several not survived
- Naples, Naples Cathedral, Chapel of Maria del Principio — apse mosaic (1322) by Lello da Orvieto
- Orvieto, Orvieto Cathedral / Santa Maria Assunta — work started in 1321, until 16th century. Removed originals were: by Piero di Puccio (1350–80) and other mosaicists including Lorenzo Maitani (the decorations on the towers, on the bars and on the frames), att. to Orcagna; «Baptism» by Giovanni di Bonino (1359—1360); «Annunciation» and «Nativity» by Fra’ Giovanni di Leonardello and the Ugolino di Prete Ilario, Nello di Giacomino. It were replaced in 1484, 1713 and 1842. Some small original fragments are now in Museo dell’Opera del Duomo; fragment of original mosaic «Birth of Mary» by Ugolino di Prete Ilario is now in Victoria and Albert Museum of London. Current mosaics were made by Cesare Nebbia (16th century); plus «Presentation» by Giuseppe Ottaviani (18th century).
- Pisa, Pisa Cathedral / Santa Maria Assunta (14th–15th centuries) — mosaic «Christ Enthroned with the Virgin and Saint John» by Cimabue (1302). This is the last work by Cimabue and the only work of his for which we have certified documentation. The mosaic, in large part made by Francesco da Pisa, was brought to completion by Vincino da Pistoia with the Madonna on the left-hand side (1320).
- Siena, Siena Cathedral, floor (it:Pavimento del Duomo di Siena) — works begins, this earliest parts not survived
- Venice, Basilica di San Marco — baptistery
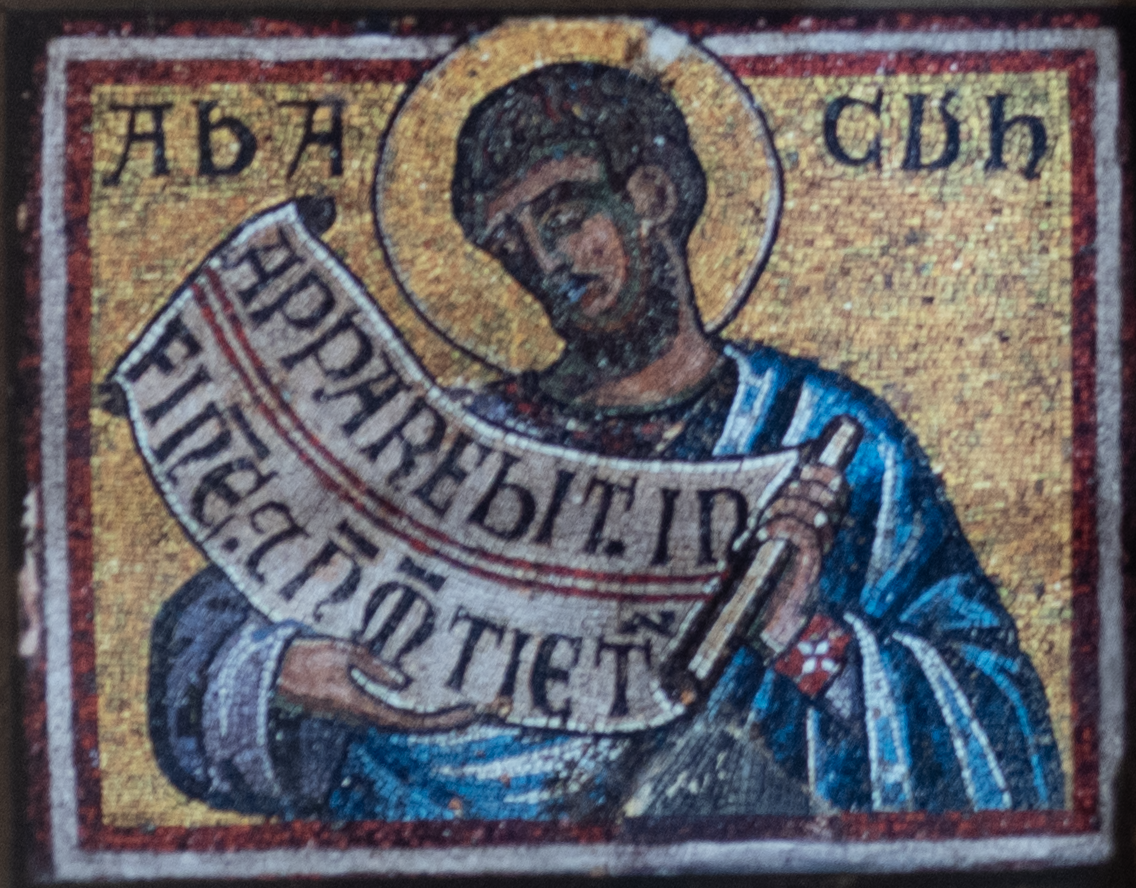
Florence Baptistery

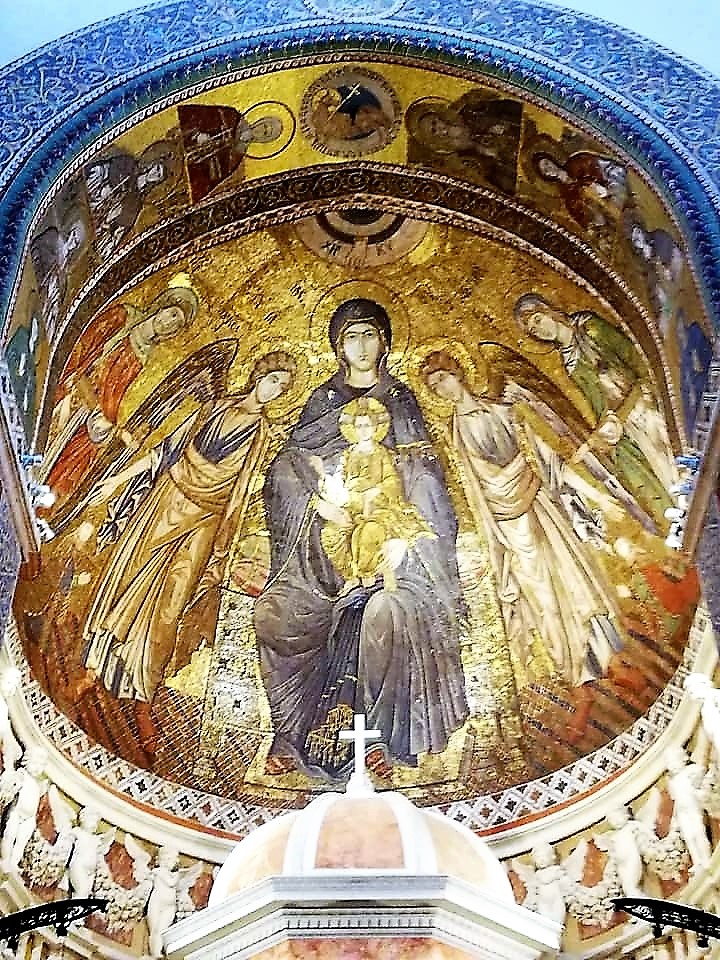
Messina

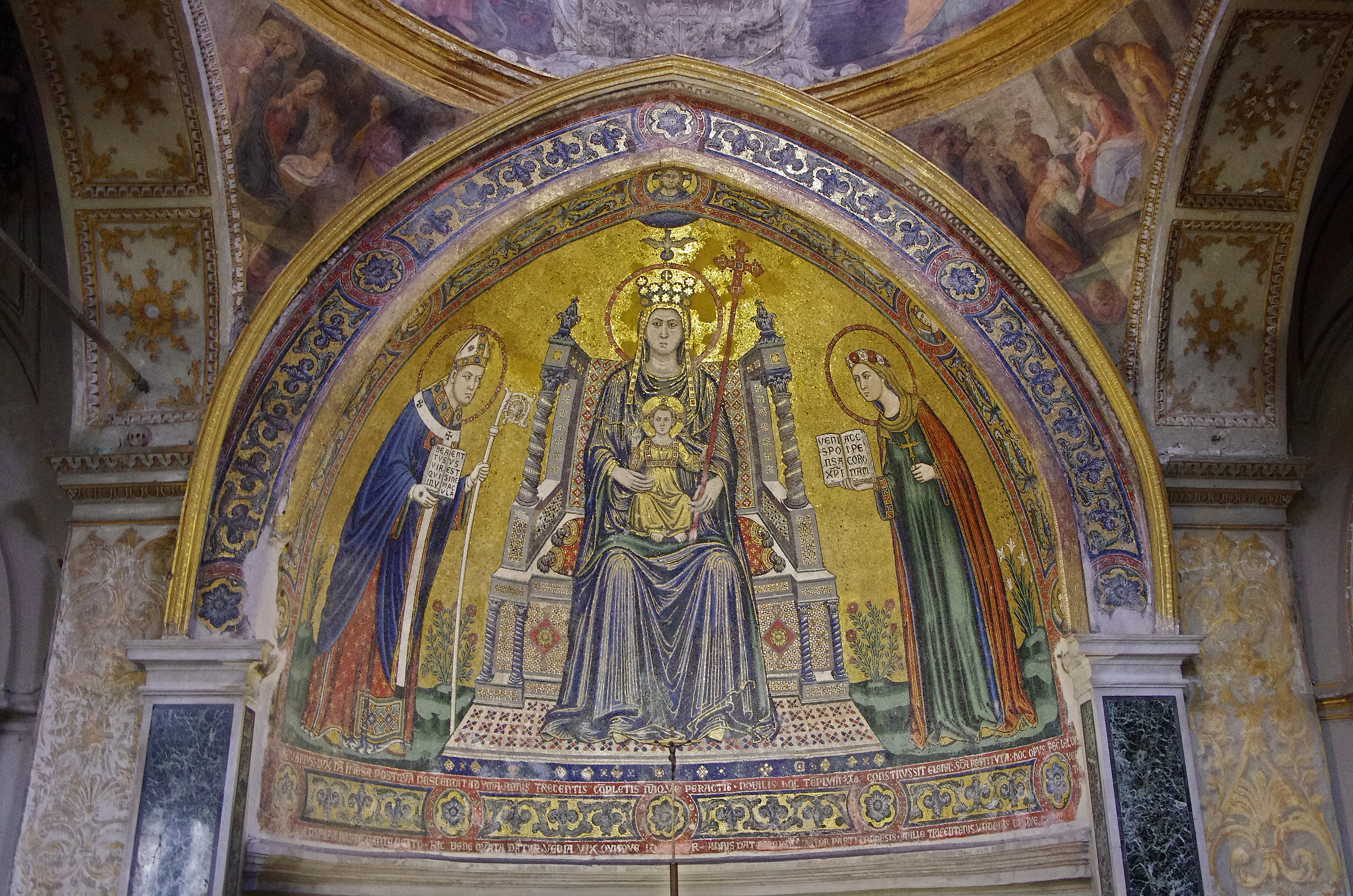
Naples

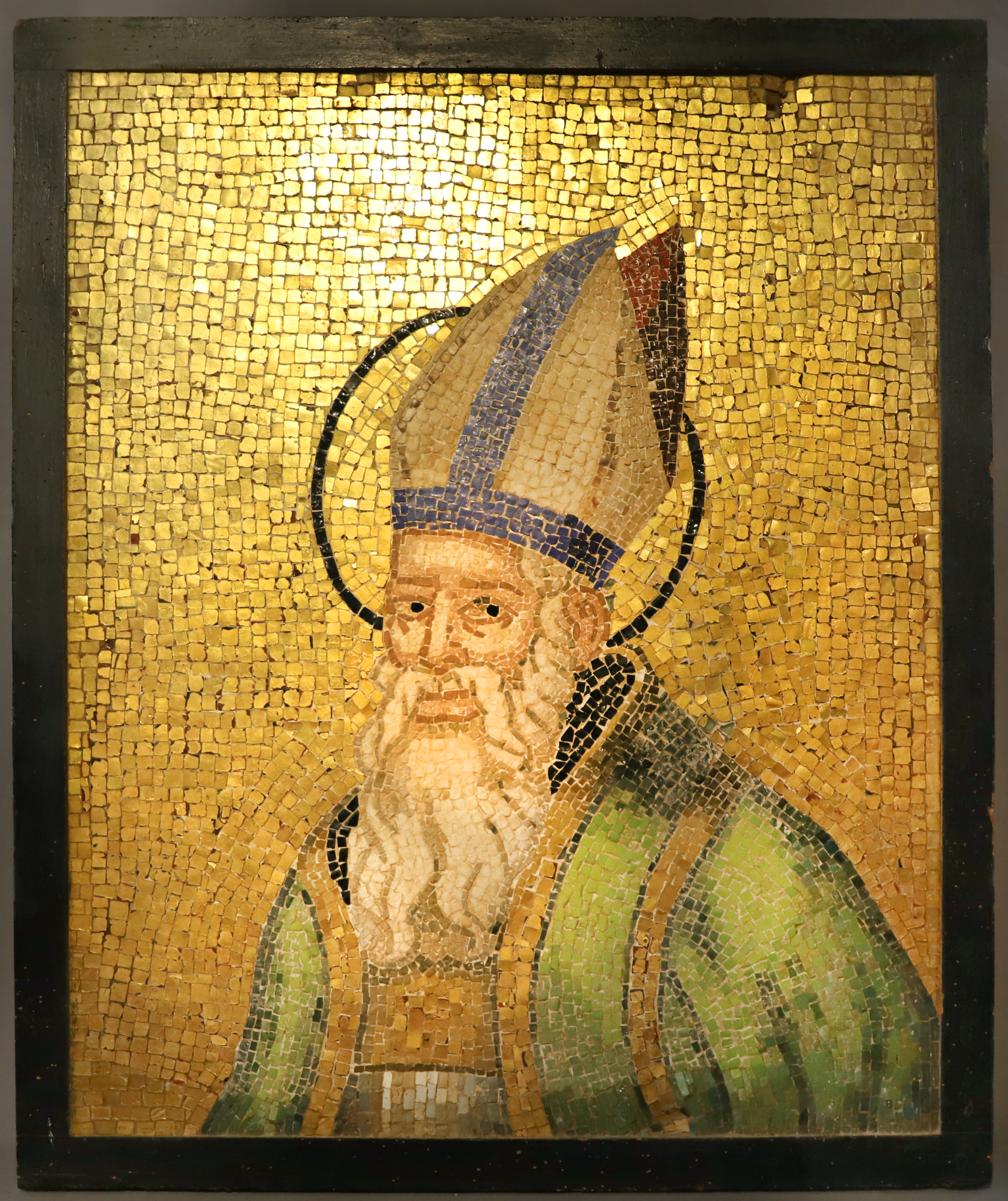
Fragment from Orvieto cathedral facade by Pietro di Puccio (1388), Museo dell'Opera del Duomo (Orvieto)

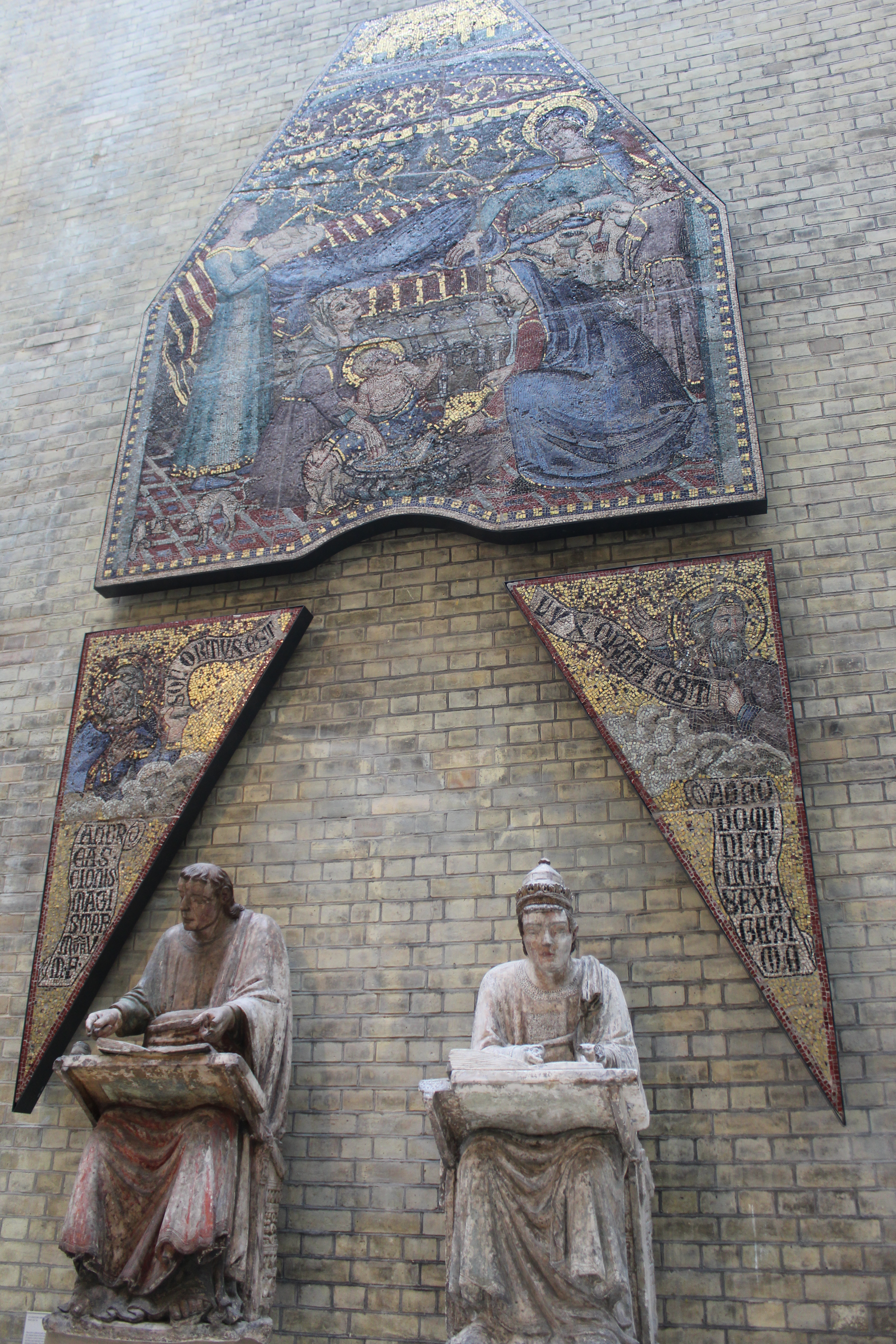
Mosaic panels from Orvieto Cathedral, V&A

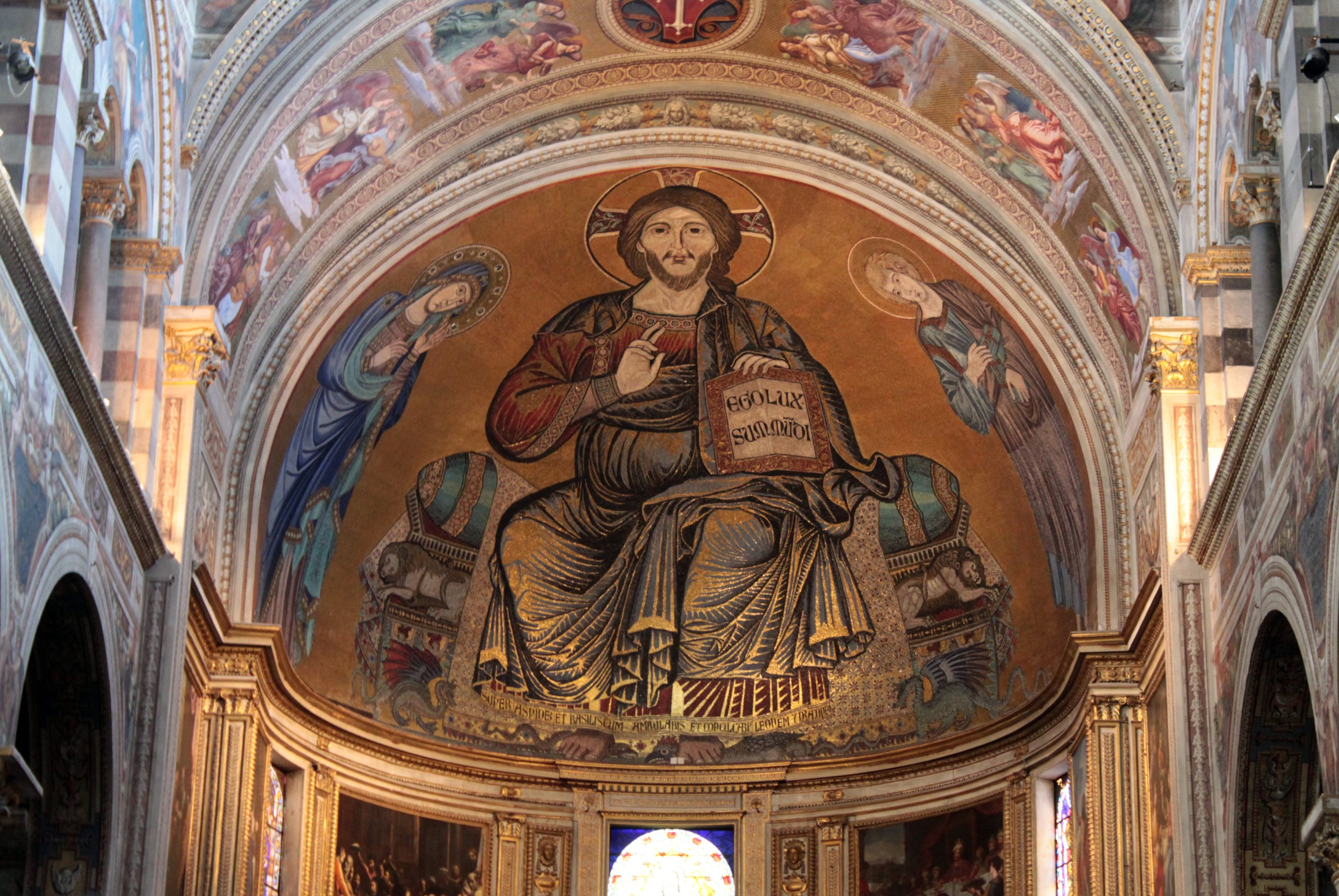
Pisa

=== Levant ===
Islamic mosaics:

- Damascus (Syria), Mausoleum of Emir Tankiz al-Nasiri at Tankiz Mosque (ar:جامع_تنكز), part of former Palace of Tankiz
- Hebron (West Bank, Palestinian Territories), Ibrahimi Mosque / Cave of the Patriarchs
- Jerusalem (Israil), Madrasa of Tankiz / Tankiziyya
- Tripoli (Lebanon), Burtasiyya Mosque / Al-Burtasi Mosque — mihrab

=== Turkey, Istambul ===
- Church of Christ in Chora (Kariye Camii)
- Hagia Sophia — Seraphim mosaics
- Pammakaristos Church (Fethiye Camii)
- Church, now Vefa Kilise Camii / Church-Mosque of Vefa — fragments
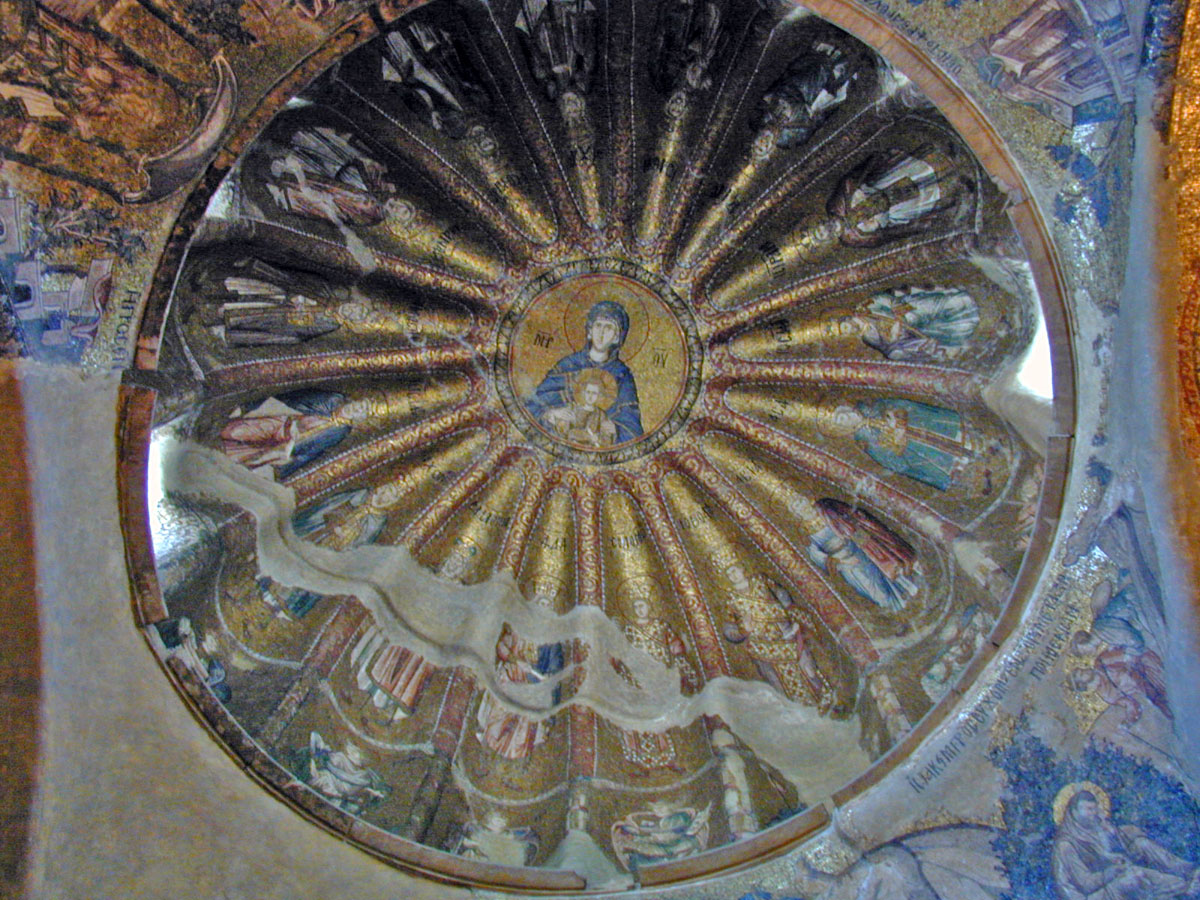
Chora

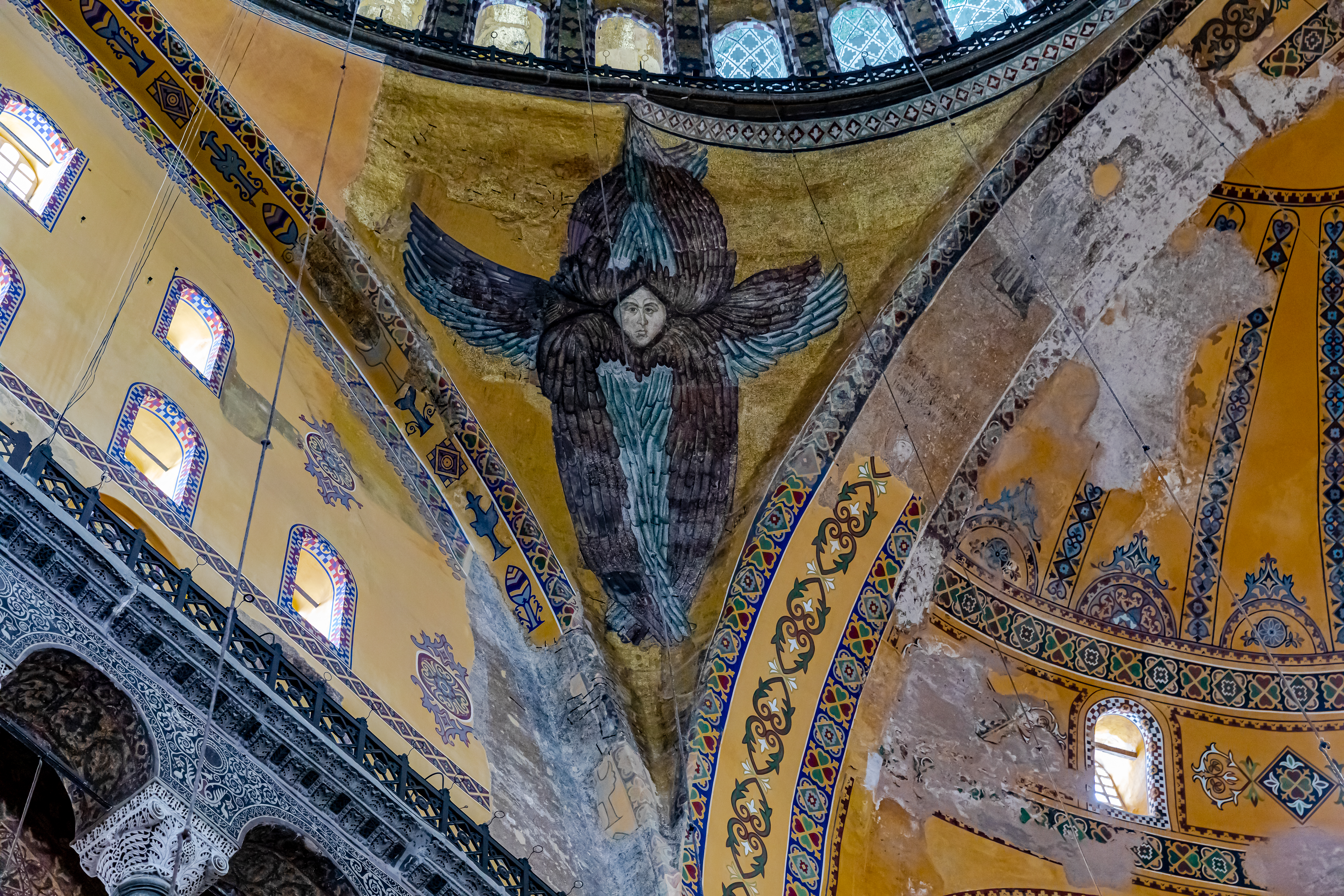
Hagia Sophia, Seraphims

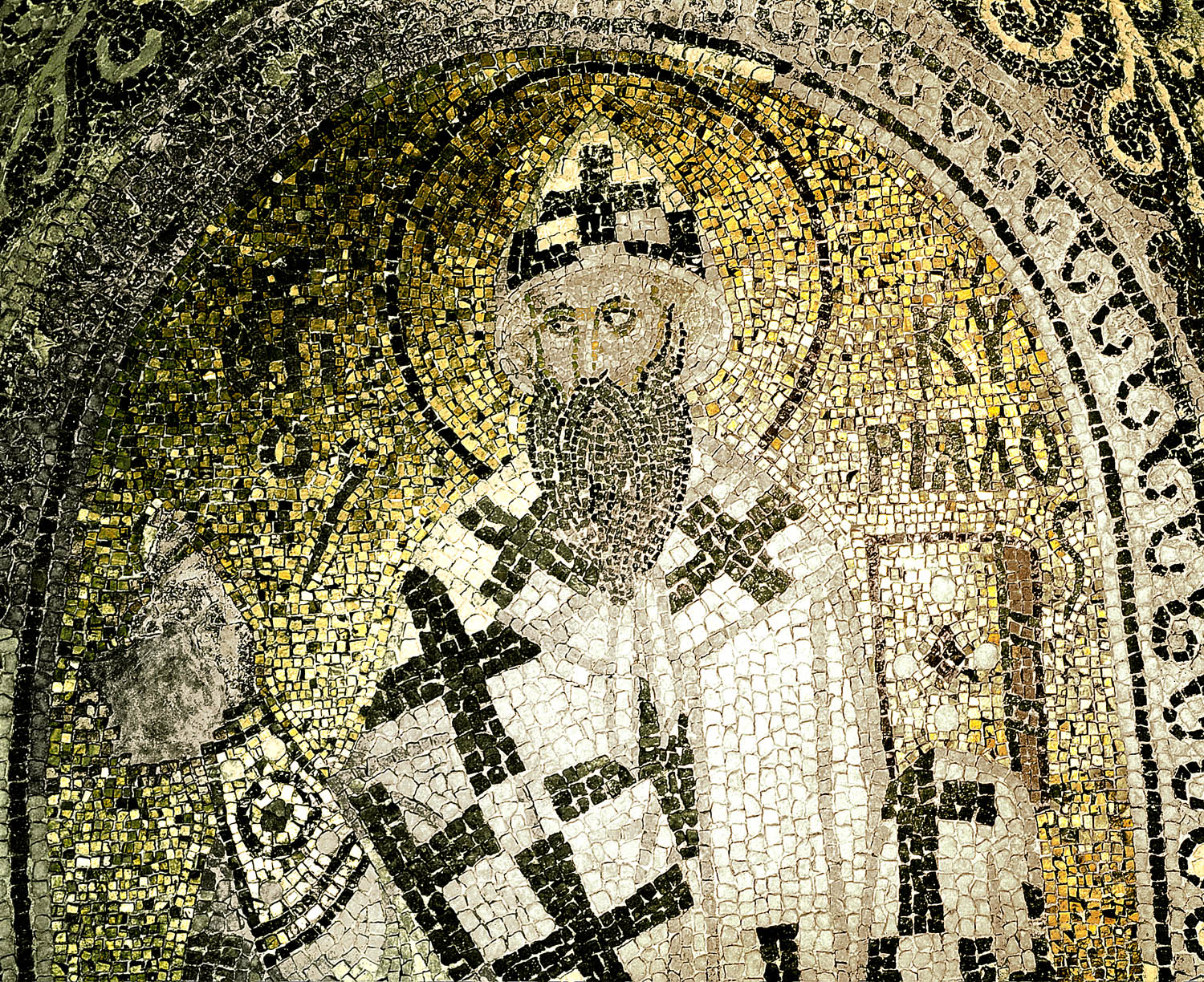
Pammakaristos

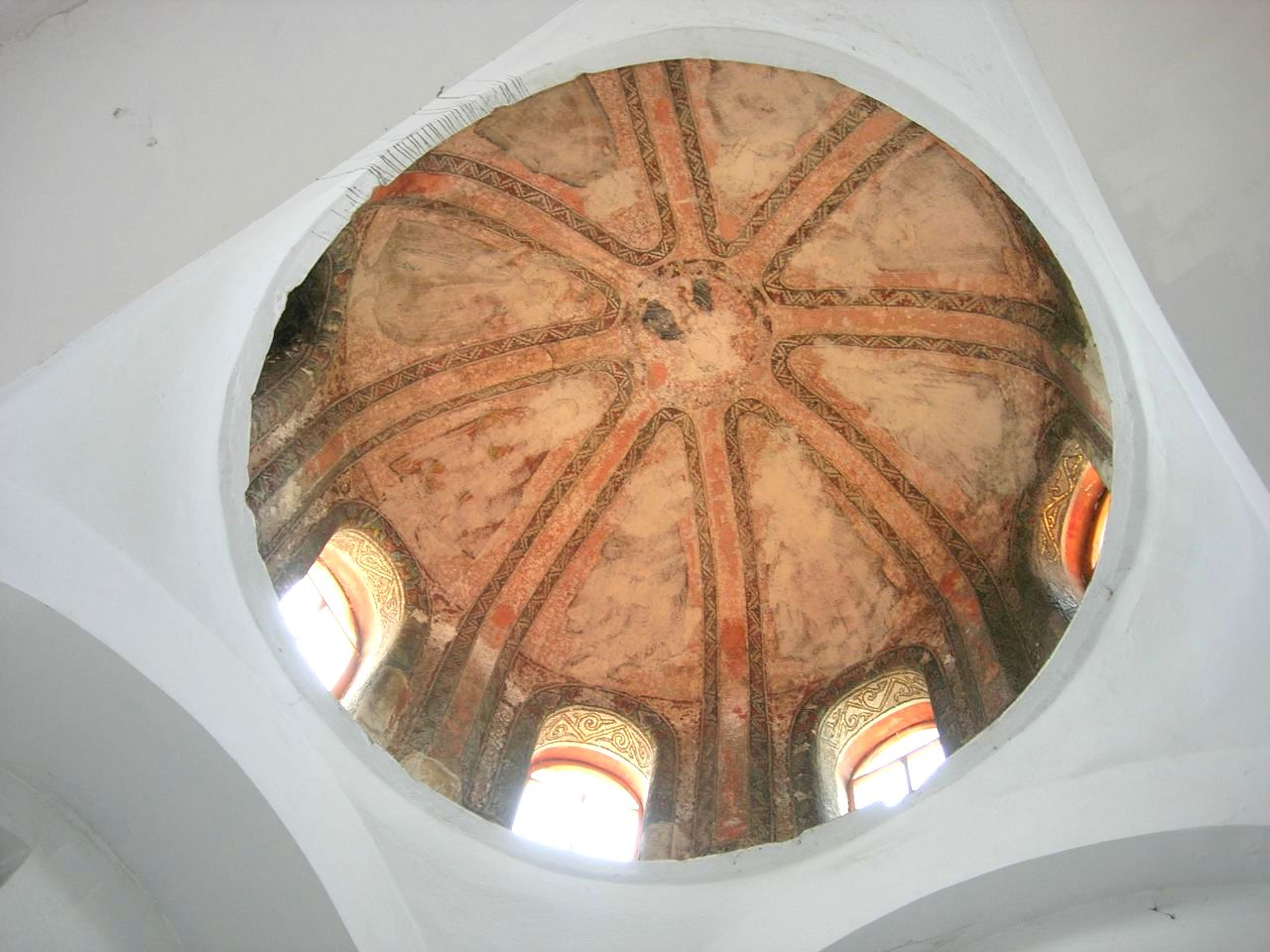
Vefa

== 15th century ==
=== Italy ===
- Florence, Florence Baptistery — under almost constant restoration from the late 14th century onwards, with particularly notable schemes occurring in 1402, 1481, 1483—1499 (overseen by Alesso Baldovinetti, who was made «official restorer of the mosaic decoration»)
- Rome, Church of Santa Croce in Gerusalemme, Saint Helen Chapel (c. 1484) — attributed to Michelozzo da Forli and Baldassaro Peruzzi.
- Siena, Floor of Siena Cathedral (it:Pavimento del Duomo di Siena — survive earliest parts (but with 19th-century restorations)
- Venice, San Marco — some repairs?
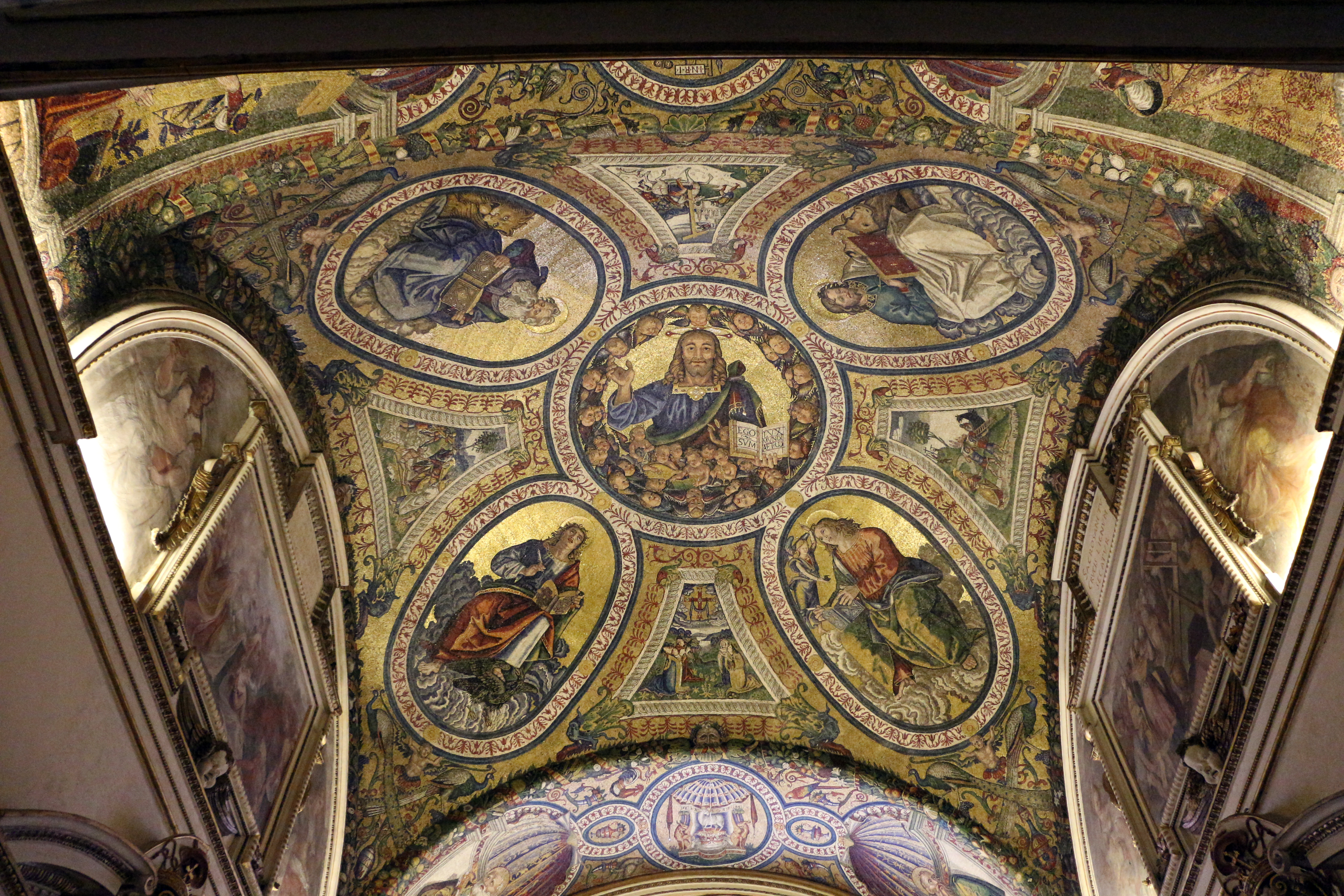
Santa Croce in Gerusalemme

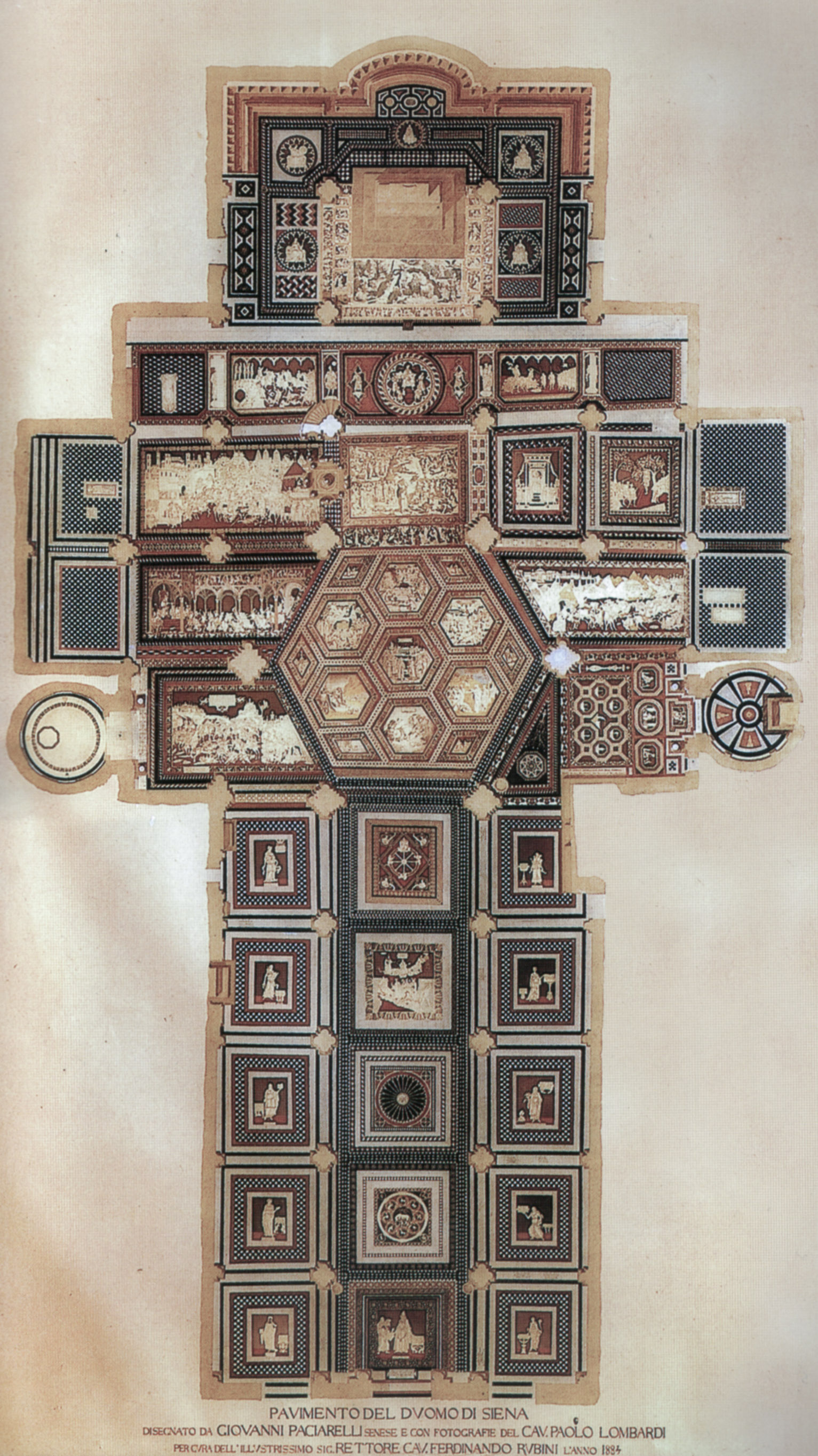
Siena Cathedral

=== France ===
- Bayeux, Bayeux Cathedral — Labyrinth floor
- Saint-Quentin (Aisne), Basilica of Saint-Quentin — Labyrinth floor (1495)
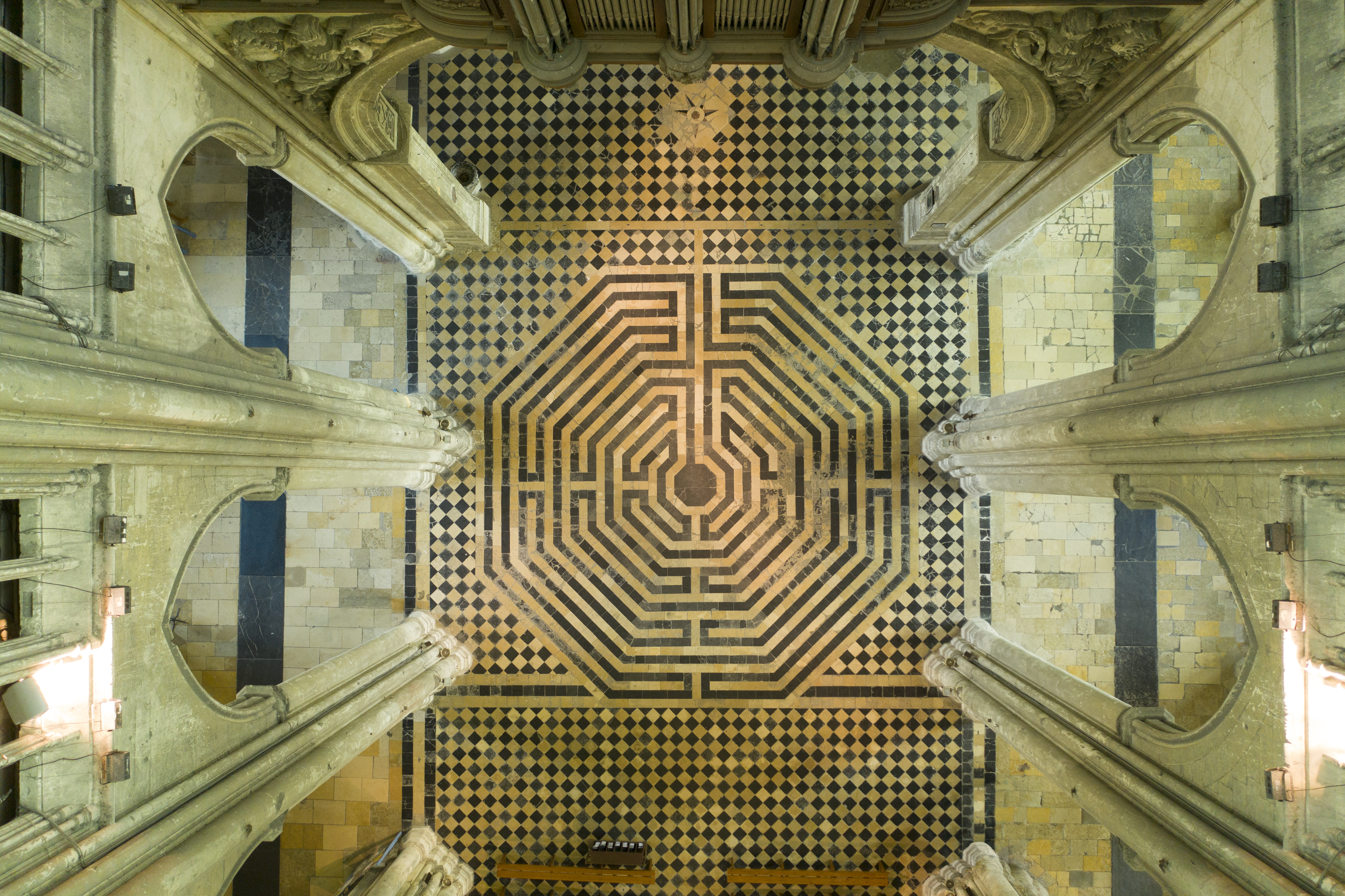
Saint-Quentin

=== Greece ===
- Pikouliana (el), Church of the Virgin Pege — mosaic in niche in facade

== Bibliography ==
- James, Liz. Mosaics in the Medieval World, From Late Antiquity to the Fifteenth Century. Cambridge University Press, 2017. P. 466—475.
